= Penncrest School District =

School district in Pennsylvania

Coordinates: 41.71548°N 80.22004°W

PENNCREST School District
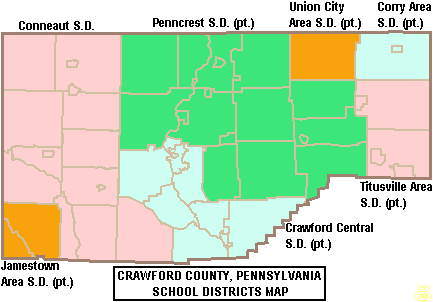
- Map of Crawford County, Pennsylvania school districts, with PENNCREST School District's primary area of coverage highlighted in green.

Address
- 18741 State Highway 198, Suite 101 Saegertown, Crawford, Pennsylvania, 16433; United States

District information
- Type: Public
- Motto: Empowering Life-Long Learners
- Established: 1971

Students and staff
- Colors: blue & gold (Saegertown), gold & black (Maplewood), blue & white (Cambridge Springs)

Other information
- Website: http://penncrest.org/

Penncrest School District is a midsized public school district located primarily in Crawford County, in Northwest Pennsylvania, with a small portion of the district's service area in adjacent Venango County. The school district encompasses several rural townships and boroughs. Its administrative offices are located in Hayfield Township outside Saegertown, Pennsylvania. Penncrest School District encompasses approximately 400 square miles. According to 2000 federal census data it serves a resident population of 24,780 people. In 2009, the district residents' per capita income was $16,413, while the median family income was $42,566 a year.

The school district consists of community centered schools: three K-6 elementary schools and three 7–12 high schools. Its total enrollment is around 3,500 in 2009.

== History ==
The school district was founded in the 1970s through a merger of the Saegertown, Randolph-East Mead, Townville, and Cambridge Springs school systems. The name PENNCREST is derived from the words Pennsylvania, Cambridge Springs, Randolph, East Mead, Saegertown, and Townville. Its physical plant at one point in time consisted of a total of four K-4 and two K-6 elementary schools, two 5–8 middle schools, two 9–12 high schools, and one 7–12 joint high school. Its plant was reduced to its current composition by the decommissioning of several elementary and middle schools during the 1990s and 2000s.

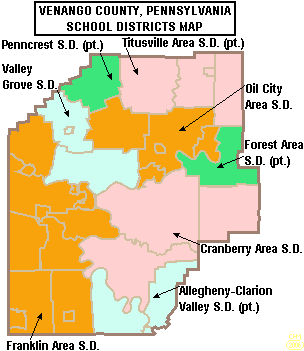
PENNCREST School District also serves Plum Township in Venango County.

== Schools ==
- Cambridge Springs Elementary School
- Cambridge Springs Junior-Senior High School
- Maplewood Elementary School
- Maplewood Junior-Senior High School
- Saegertown Elementary School
- Saegertown Junior-Senior High School

== Municipalities ==
The following is a list of municipalities served by the PENNCREST School District.

=== Townships ===
- Athens Township
- Cambridge Township
- Cussewago Township
- East Mead Township
- Hayfield Township
- Plum Township
- Randolph Township
- Richmond Township
- Rockdale Township
- Steuben Township
- Troy Township
- Venango Township
- Woodcock Township

=== Boroughs and CDPs ===
- Blooming Valley
- Cambridge Springs
- Guys Mills (census-designated place)
- Saegertown
- Townville
- Venango
- Woodcock
