= Pennsylvania Route 198 =

State highway in Crawford County, Pennsylvania, US

Pennsylvania Route 198

Route information
- Maintained by PennDOT
- Length: 38.8 mi (62.4 km)

Major junctions
- West end: SR 167 near Pierpont, OH
- PA 18 in Conneautville; PA 98 in Hayfield Township; I-79 in Hayfield Township; US 6 / US 19 in Saegertown; PA 86 in Woodcock Township; PA 77 in Blooming Valley
- East end: PA 27 near Mount Hope

Location
- Country: United States
- State: Pennsylvania
- Counties: Crawford

Highway system
- Pennsylvania State Route System; Interstate; US; State; Scenic; Legislative
← PA 197	→ PA 199

Pennsylvania Route 198 (PA 198) is a 38.8-mile-long (62.4 km) state highway located in Crawford County, Pennsylvania. The western terminus is at the Ohio state line near Pierpont where the road continues as Ohio State Route 167 (SR 167). The eastern terminus is at PA 27 near Mount Hope.

== Route description ==
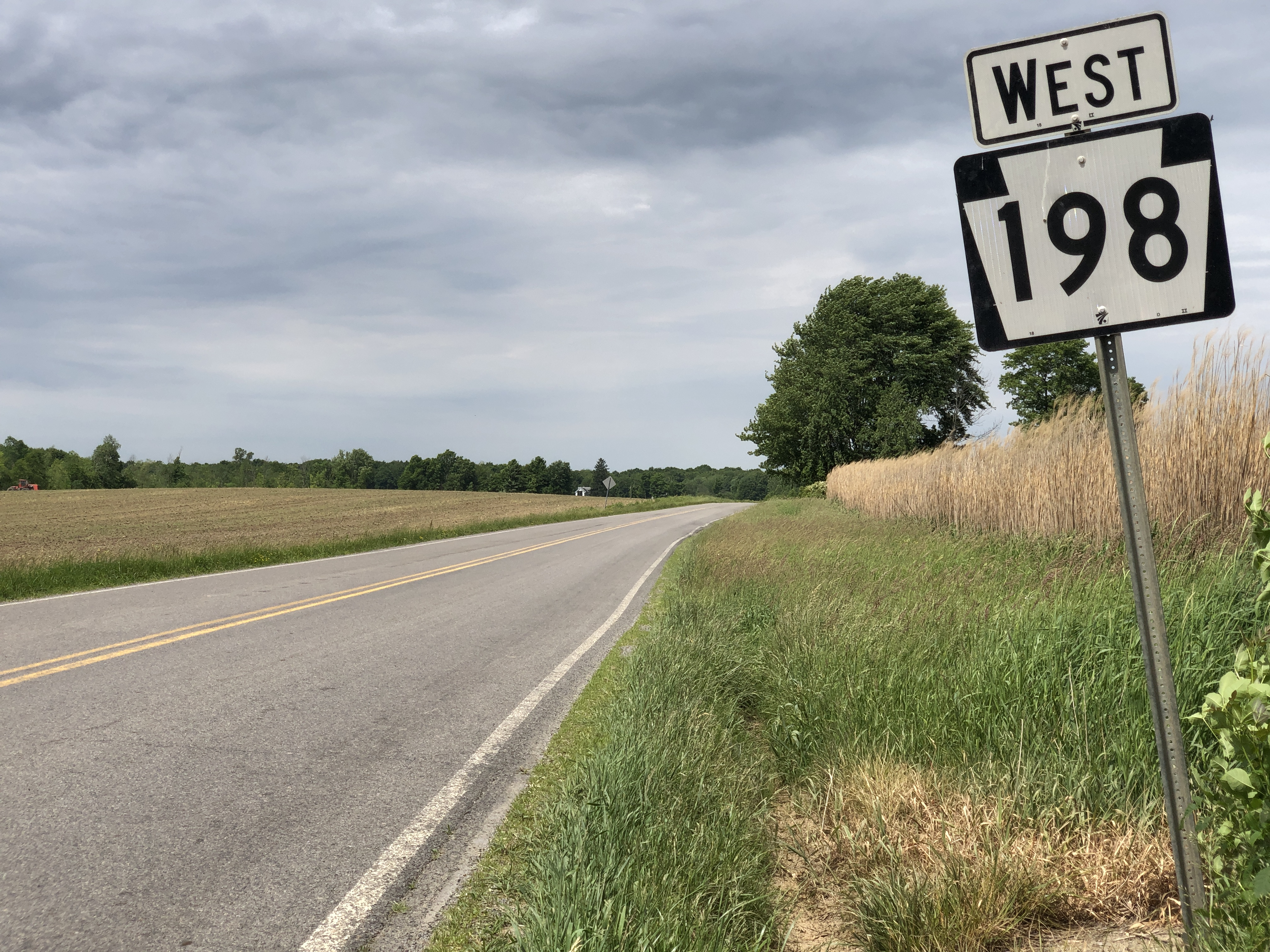
PA 198 westbound in Beaver Township

PA 198 begins at the Ohio border in Beaver Township, where the road continues into that state as SR 167. From the state line, the route heads east on two-lane undivided Pierpoint Road through a mix of farmland and woodland. PA 198 passes through Palmer before entering Spring Township and becoming Atroskin Road. The route continues into the borough of Conneautville and becomes Licking Street, passing homes. PA 198 turns northeast onto Mulberry Street and crosses Conneaut Creek and the Canadian National's Bessemer Subdivision railroad line before coming to an intersection with PA 18. At this point, PA 198 turns southeast to form a concurrency with PA 18 on Main Street, passing through the commercial downtown prior to passing more residences. PA 198 splits from PA 18 by heading east on an unnamed road, crossing into Summerhill Township. The road continues through a mix of farms and forests with a few homes, curving to the southeast and crossing Rundelltown Creek west of Norrisville. In the community of Norrisville, the route enters Hayfield Township and heads more to the east. In Littles Corners, PA 198 comes to a junction with PA 98. The route continues through more rural areas, crossing the Cussewago Creek and passing through Coons Corners prior to reaching an interchange with I-79. A park and ride lot is located within the southeast quadrant of this interchange.

Past this interchange, PA 198 passes through a mix of farmland, woodland, and residences and turns north onto North Mead Road before turning east onto another unnamed road. The road runs through rural areas with some residential development prior to crossing the French Creek into the borough of Saegertown and coming to a roundabout with US 6/US 19. Here, PA 198 turns south to form a concurrency with US 6/US 19 on Main Street, passing a mix of homes and businesses. In the southern part of town, PA 198 splits at a roundabout by heading east on South Street, passing under a Western New York and Pennsylvania Railroad line. The route turns southeast and becomes unnamed, passing a mix of farmland and woodland with a few homes as it heads into Woodcock Township. PA 198 turns south for a short concurrency with PA 86 prior to continuing east through forested areas with some homes, passing to the north of Woodcock Creek Lake. The road turns to the southeast and continues into the borough of Blooming Valley, where it becomes Saegertown Street. The route passes homes and turns south, coming to an intersection with PA 77. Past here, PA 198 becomes Dickson Street and runs past more residences, leaving Blooming Valley for East Mead Township. The road continues through areas of woods and farms with some residences, turning south and becoming the border between East Mead Township to the west and Randolph Township to the east. The route turns east and fully enters Randolph Township, passing through more rural areas and turning south. PA 198 continues to the residential community of Guys Mills, where it turns east and passes through the Erie National Wildlife Refuge. The route turns south and passes through farmland, woodland, and homes prior to coming to its terminus at PA 27.

== Major intersections ==
The entire route is in Crawford County.

Location	mi	km	Destinations	Notes
Beaver Township	0.0	0.0	SR 167 west	Western terminus of PA 198 at Ohio state line
Conneautville	7.9	12.7	PA 18 north (Main Street) – Girard	West end of PA 18 concurrency
Summerhill Township	8.7	14.0	PA 18 south – Conneaut Lake	East end of PA 18 concurrency
Hayfield Township	16.3	26.2	PA 98 – Fairview, Meadville	
Hayfield Township	18.0	29.0	I-79 – Erie, Pittsburgh	Exit 154 on I-79
Saegertown	21.0	33.8	US 6 east / US 19 north – Cambridge Springs	Roundabout; west end of US 6/19 concurrency
Saegertown	21.7	34.9	US 6 west / US 19 south – Meadville	Roundabout; east end of US 6/19 concurrency
Woodcock Township	23.8	38.3	PA 86 north – Cambridge Springs	West end of PA 86 concurrency
Woodcock Township	23.9	38.5	PA 86 south	East end of PA 86 concurrency
Blooming Valley	28.2	45.4	PA 77 (State Street) – Spartansburg, Meadville	
Randolph Township	38.8	62.4	PA 27 (Guys Mill Road) – Titusville, Meadville	Eastern terminus of PA 198
1.000 mi = 1.609 km; 1.000 km = 0.621 mi: Concurrency terminus
