= Venango Township, Pennsylvania =

Venango Township is the name of some places in the U.S. state of Pennsylvania:

- Venango Township, Butler County, Pennsylvania
- Venango Township, Crawford County, Pennsylvania
- Venango Township, Erie County, Pennsylvania
