= Beaver Township, Pennsylvania =

Beaver Township is the name of some places in the U.S. state of Pennsylvania:

- Beaver Township, Clarion County, Pennsylvania
- Beaver Township, Columbia County, Pennsylvania
- Beaver Township, Crawford County, Pennsylvania
- Beaver Township, Jefferson County, Pennsylvania
- Beaver Township, Snyder County, Pennsylvania

== See also ==
- North Beaver Township, Pennsylvania
- South Beaver Township, Pennsylvania
- Little Beaver Township, Pennsylvania
- Big Beaver, Pennsylvania
- New Beaver, Pennsylvania
- Beaver, Pennsylvania
