= PS Furniture =

American furniture manufacturer

PS Furniture, Inc.
- Formerly: Snyder Chair Company; Palmer Snyder
- Company type: Private (employee-owned)
- Industry: Furniture manufacturing
- Founded: 1919; 107 years ago
- Headquarters: Conneautville, Pennsylvania, U.S.
- Area served: North America
- Key people: Sage Scott (President)
- Products: Folding tables; flip-top tables; stacking chairs; portable dance floors; modular flooring
- Owner: Employee Stock Ownership Plan (since 2025)
- Website: www.psfurniture.com

PS Furniture, Inc. is an American employee-owned manufacturer of commercial and event furniture, including folding tables, flip-top tables, stacking chairs, portable dance floors, and modular flooring systems. It is headquartered and manufactures its products in Conneautville, Pennsylvania. In 2025, The Washington Post described the company as “one of the last remaining U.S. manufacturers of commercial furniture used in schools, offices, convention centers and event venues.”

== History ==
The company was founded in 1919 in Conneautville, Pennsylvania, as the Snyder Chair Company, producing hardwood folding chairs using locally sourced timber. It later operated under the name Palmer Snyder before adopting the PS Furniture brand.

In November 2025, PS Furniture transitioned to employee ownership through an Employee Stock Ownership Plan (ESOP). Reporting from the Meadville Tribune stated that the change was intended to keep ownership local and maintain the company’s role as one of Conneautville’s largest employers.

== Operations ==
The company manufactures commercial furniture for convention centers, hotels, educational institutions, and multipurpose venues, distributing products throughout North America.

The Washington Post reported that PS Furniture saw increased demand in 2025 following changes to U.S. tariffs on imported furniture, which made domestically produced goods more competitive.

== Products ==
PS Furniture produces composite folding tables, flip-top nesting tables, stacking chairs, portable dance floors, and modular flooring systems. Several of its designs are protected by U.S. patents. In 2021, the company introduced a flip-top table incorporating ballistic-resistant materials.
