= Summerhill Township, Pennsylvania =

Summerhill Township is the name of some places in the U.S. state of Pennsylvania:

- Summerhill Township, Cambria County, Pennsylvania
- Summerhill Township, Crawford County, Pennsylvania
