= Erie National Wildlife Refuge =

Protected area in Pennsylvania, United States

- IUCN category IV (habitat/species management area)
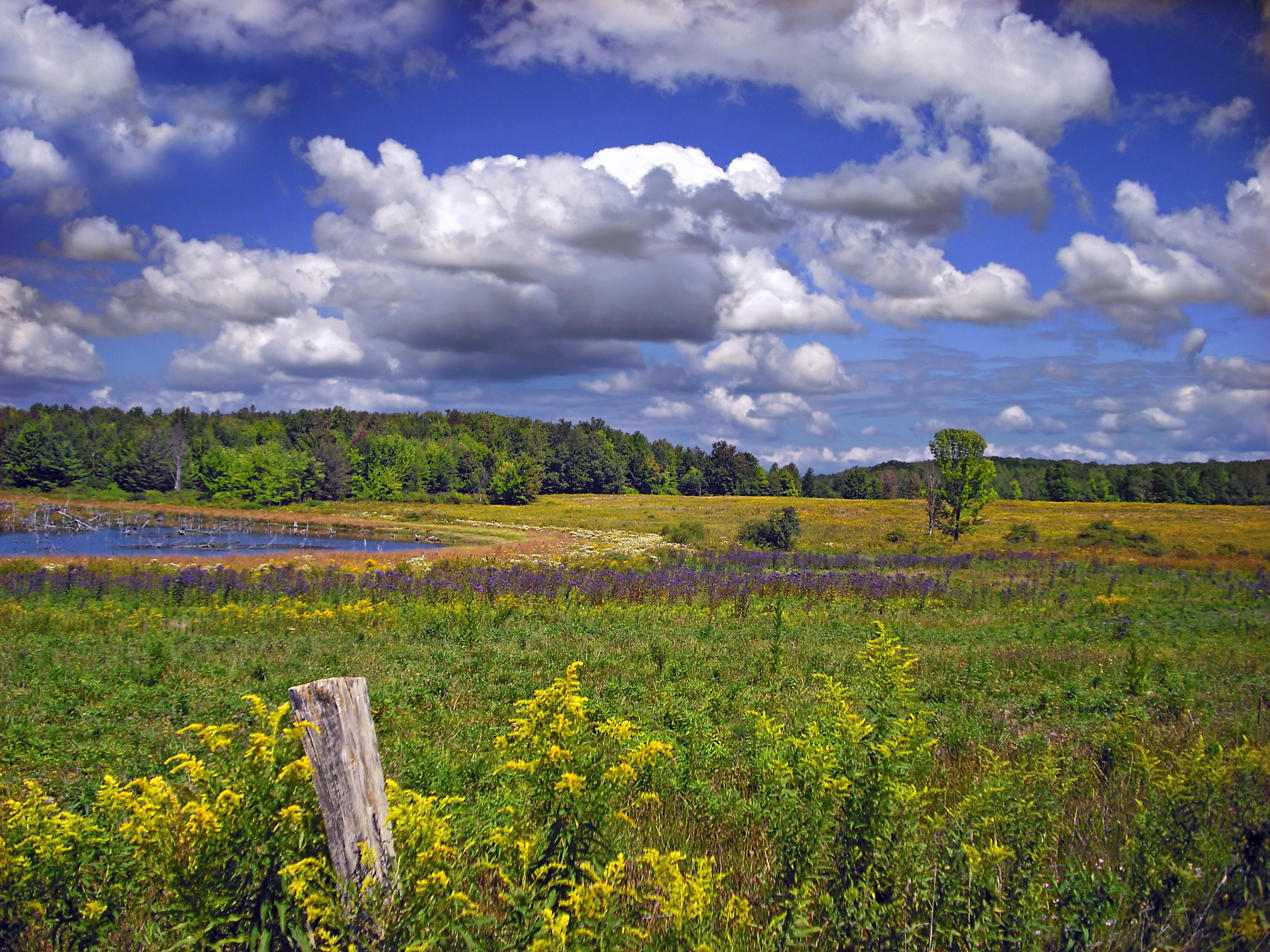

- Location within Pennsylvania
- Location: Crawford, Pennsylvania, United States
- Coordinates: 41°37′39″N 79°57′50″W
- Area: 13.75 sq mi (35.6 km^{2})
- Established: May 22, 1959
- Visitors: 30,000
- Operator: United States Fish and Wildlife Service
- Website: www.fws.gov/refuge/erie/

The Erie National Wildlife Refuge is an 8,777-acre (3,552 ha) National Wildlife Refuge located in Crawford County, Pennsylvania. Named after the Erie tribe, it was established to provide waterfowl and other migratory birds with nesting, feeding, brooding, and resting habitat.

The refuge consists of two separate land divisions. The 5,206-acre (2,107 ha) Sugar Lake Division is closest to Guys Mills, Pennsylvania and is 8.5 miles (13.7 km) east of Meadville. The Seneca Division, consisting of 3,571 acres (1,445 ha), is 10 miles (16 km) north of the Sugar Lake Division and borders French Creek near Cambridge Springs, Pennsylvania.

The Erie National Wildlife Refuge was designated an Important Bird Area by the National Audubon Society because of the diversity of habitat it provides to the approximate 237 species of birds attracted to the refuge.

== History ==
The Erie National Wildlife Refuge was established on May 22, 1959. The land was "purchased with funds provided from the sale of the Migratory Bird Hunting and Conservation Stamps, which are often called "Duck Stamps"."

== Topography ==
Erie Refuge consists of two separate land divisions. The Sugar Lake Division contains 5,206 acres (2,107 ha) lying in a narrow valley which includes Woodcock Creek draining to the north and Lake Creek draining to the south. Beaver ponds, pools, and marshland along the creeks are bounded by forested slopes interspersed with croplands, grasslands, and wet meadows.

The Seneca Division consists of 3,571 acres (1,445 ha) situated in a forested valley where Muddy Creek and Dead Creek provide most of the wetland habitat. French Creek flows through the refuge where over 80 species of native fish are found.

Over 2,500 acres (1,000 ha)of wetland, including beaver ponds, marshes, swamps, manmade impoundments, creeks and wet meadows, provide desirable habitat for a variety of migratory birds and waterfowl. Water control structures on refuge impoundments permit the manipulation of water levels to encourage waterfowl use and the growth of desirable wetland plants. Grasslands have been developed near wetlands to provide dense nesting cover for ground-nesting waterfowl and prescribed burning is accomplished on about 100 acres (40 ha) of those grasslands annually.

A cooperative farming program permits farmers to cultivate crops on refuge lands. Farmers agree to raise certain crops such as oats, grass, clover and corn. In return for using the land, farmers leave the refuge a share of the crops. These refuge shares are usually left in the field as supplemental food for wildlife.

== Wildlife and protected species ==
The diverse habitat types found on Erie NWR attract over 237 species of birds, 47 species of mammals and 37 species of amphibians and reptiles. Of particular interest are the endangered northern riffleshell (Epioblasma torulosa rangiana) and clubshell mussels (Pleurobema clava).

=== Birds ===
The diverse habitat types found on Erie Refuge attract 237 species of birds, with nesting habitat for 113 bird species.

The refuge provides refuge for migrating waterfowl for up to 2,500 ducks and 4,500 Canada geese. Other migrating birds include Canada geese, wood ducks, mallards, blue-winged teal, and hooded mergansers. Some less numerous migrants are pintail, green-winged teal, American wigeon, scaup, bufflehead, golden-eye, ring-necked ducks, and black ducks.

Wood ducks are the most prolific waterfowl nesters on the refuge. Their annual production is significantly increased by the placement of nesting boxes on refuge wetlands. Hooded mergansers, mallards, blue-winged teal and Canada geese are other common resident nesting waterfowl.

Bald eagles nest on the refuge and osprey visit in search of food. Red-tailed hawks and American kestrels are common raptors that nest here.

During the summer shorebirds such as sandpipers and yellowlegs appear in small flocks, feeding on the mudflats. The most noticeable marsh birds are great blue herons, which nest in rookeries on the refuge.

=== Mammals ===
Some 47 species of mammals are present on this refuge including occasional sightings of bobcats. The most commonly seen are black bear, skunk, white-tailed deer, coyote, raccoon, beaver, fox, river otter, muskrat and woodchuck.

=== Fish ===
Common warm water fish occurring in refuge waters include black crappie, yellow perch, largemouth bass, bluegills, sunfish and bullheads. Common cold water species include trout and white suckers, found in Woodcock Creek.

== Potential Natural Vegetation ==
According to the A. W. Kuchler U.S. potential natural vegetation types, Erie National Wildlife Refuge would have a dominant vegetation type of Northern Hardwoods (106) with a dominant vegetation form of Northern hardwood forest (23).

== Climate ==
According to the Trewartha climate classification system, Erie National Wildlife Refuge has a Temperate Continental climate (Dc) with warm summers (b), cold winters (0) and year-around precipitation. Dcbo climates are characterized by at least one month having an average mean temperature ≤ 32.0 °F (0 °C), four to seven months with an average mean temperature ≥ 50.0 °F (10 °C), all months with an average mean temperature < 72.0 °F (22 °C) and no significant precipitation difference between seasons. Although most summer days are comfortably humid at Erie National Wildlife Refuge, episodes of heat and high humidity can occur with heat index values > 95 °F (35 °C). Since 1981, the highest air temperature was 98.2 °F (37 °C) on 07/16/1988, and the highest average mean dew point was 72.1 °F (22 °C) on 07/21/2011. The average wettest month is July which corresponds with the annual peak in thunderstorm activity. Since 1981, the wettest calendar day was 3.91 inches (99 mm) on 09/09/2004. During the winter months, the plant hardiness zone is 5b with an average annual extreme minimum air temperature of −13.9 °F (−25 °C). Since 1981, the coldest air temperature was −25.2 °F (−32 °C) on 01/19/1994. Episodes of extreme cold and wind can occur with wind chill values < −27 °F (−33 °C). The average annual snowfall total is ≈ 80 inches (≈ 203 cm). Ice storms and large snowstorms depositing ≥ 12 inches (30 cm) are frequent, particularly during Lake-effect snow events and nor’easters.

Climate data for Erie National Wildlife Refuge Admin Building and Visitor Contact Station. 1981-2010 Averages (1981-2018 Records).
Month	Jan	Feb	Mar	Apr	May	Jun	Jul	Aug	Sep	Oct	Nov	Dec	Year
Record high °F (°C)	66.6 (19.2)	72.1 (22.3)	80.4 (26.9)	86.3 (30.2)	88.4 (31.3)	93.7 (34.3)	98.2 (36.8)	95.0 (35.0)	90.5 (32.5)	84.6 (29.2)	75.6 (24.2)	70.7 (21.5)	98.2 (36.8)
Mean daily maximum °F (°C)	31.9 (−0.1)	34.7 (1.5)	44.0 (6.7)	57.5 (14.2)	67.7 (19.8)	75.9 (24.4)	79.6 (26.4)	78.4 (25.8)	71.2 (21.8)	59.9 (15.5)	48.0 (8.9)	35.5 (1.9)	57.1 (13.9)
Daily mean °F (°C)	24.3 (−4.3)	26.1 (−3.3)	34.3 (1.3)	46.4 (8.0)	56.2 (13.4)	65.0 (18.3)	68.9 (20.5)	67.9 (19.9)	60.8 (16.0)	49.8 (9.9)	40.0 (4.4)	28.8 (−1.8)	47.5 (8.6)
Mean daily minimum °F (°C)	16.7 (−8.5)	17.5 (−8.1)	24.6 (−4.1)	35.4 (1.9)	44.7 (7.1)	54.1 (12.3)	58.2 (14.6)	57.3 (14.1)	50.4 (10.2)	39.8 (4.3)	32.1 (0.1)	22.0 (−5.6)	37.8 (3.2)
Record low °F (°C)	−25.2 (−31.8)	−20.9 (−29.4)	−9.1 (−22.8)	8.9 (−12.8)	25.5 (−3.6)	34.4 (1.3)	39.6 (4.2)	32.9 (0.5)	31.7 (−0.2)	17.1 (−8.3)	9.0 (−12.8)	−14.4 (−25.8)	−25.2 (−31.8)
Average precipitation inches (mm)	3.06 (78)	2.53 (64)	3.15 (80)	3.67 (93)	4.24 (108)	4.60 (117)	4.73 (120)	4.11 (104)	4.39 (112)	3.74 (95)	3.95 (100)	3.62 (92)	45.79 (1,163)
Average relative humidity (%)	78.9	76.1	69.0	62.0	65.0	71.9	72.8	74.5	76.3	72.7	74.3	80.0	72.8
Average dew point °F (°C)	18.7 (−7.4)	19.6 (−6.9)	25.2 (−3.8)	34.1 (1.2)	44.6 (7.0)	55.7 (13.2)	59.8 (15.4)	59.5 (15.3)	53.3 (11.8)	41.4 (5.2)	32.5 (0.3)	23.4 (−4.8)	39.1 (3.9)
Source: PRISM

== Facilities ==
The visitor center has a 60-seat auditorium as well as an indoor bird observation area. Nine public fishing areas are open throughout the refuge. Additionally, eleven small game species, eight migratory bird species and three big game species are hunted including deer, wild turkey, rabbit, and waterfowl hunting.

Other public use facilities include an auto driving route, a waterfowl and wildlife observation blind, and the Deer Run Overlook and Kiosk.

=== Trails ===
There are 6 miles (9.7 km) of hiking trails on the refuge consisting of four nature trails ranging in length from a 1/2-mile (0.80 km) to 3 miles (4.8 km), one of which is ADA accessible.

==== Muddy Creek Holly Trail ====
This 1 mile (1.6 km) trail stretches over the glacial and riverine sediments of Muddy Creek's valley. The terrain is flat to gently rolling with an environment of meadows, marshes, oxbow sloughs, and intermediate and mature forests. A 4-foot-wide (1.2 m) boardwalk provides excellent access for the handicapped and accommodates others in this seasonally wet area. At the end of the trail lies an abutment from an iron bridge that spanned Muddy Creek on what was once a plank road across the valley.

==== Deer Run Trail ====
The 3 miles (4.8 km) long Deer Run Trail at the southern part of the Erie NWR loops through a variety of habitats, from fairly mature mixed deciduous and hemlock forest to meadows and brushy thickets near the refuge's ponds. It is also a popular cross-country ski trail.

==== Tsuga Trail ====
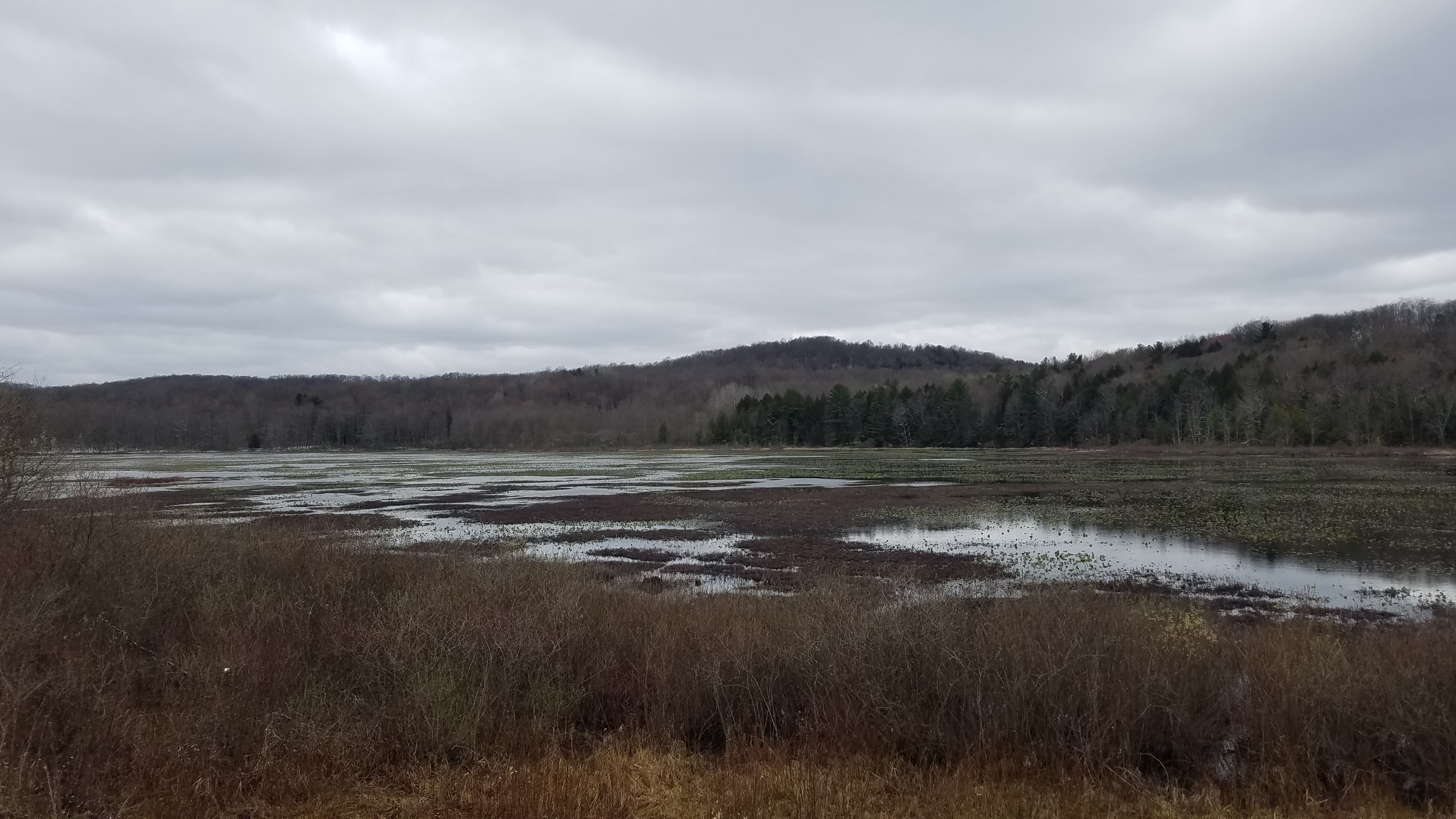
Scenery along the Tsuga Trail.

The Tsuga Trail near the Erie NWR Headquarters is a 1.2-mile (1.9 km) to 1.6-mile (2.6 km) two loop trail that winds through a variety of natural habitats. The 1.2-mile (1.9 km) loop has numbered signs designating stops which are explained in an interpretative leaflet available at the trail head. The additional 0.4-mile (0.64 km) segment passes through hardwood forests behind the headquarters and offers a couple of exhilarating downhill runs for the cross-country skier. The trail is raised above the surrounding ground and is surfaced with wood chips for comfortable, dry walking year round. Bridges carry the trail user over small streams and a beaver pond. The shorter loop is gently sloping and presents no demanding hills to climb.

As with the rest of the Erie National Wildlife Refuge, the Tsuga Trail area has a variety of rich natural habitats. Along this trail you will pass through meadows of upland grasses, wetlands with waterfowl and amphibians, mixed forests and cool, dark hemlock thickets. Naturally, wildlife is abundant.

==== Beaver Run Trail ====
Beaver Run Trail is a 1 mile (1.6 km) loop with a spur trail at its eastern end. The trail takes the visitor through woods, along cultivated fields and past beaver ponds with their rich aquatic habitat.

A short distance north of Beaver Run Trail on the west side of Hank's Road is a sandstone springhouse that was used to keep milk and foodstuffs cool (36-40 degrees) during much of the year. Cans of milk were kept cool in a waterproof trough. Sandstone for the springhouse was of local origin. Bore holes drilled in the solid stone were filled with water which, in winter, froze to cleave the stone. The stones were finish dressed with sledge and chisel.

== See also ==
- List of National Wildlife Refuges
