= Beaver Township, Crawford County, Pennsylvania =

Township in Pennsylvania, US

Coordinates: 41°50′00″N 80°30′59″W

- Township
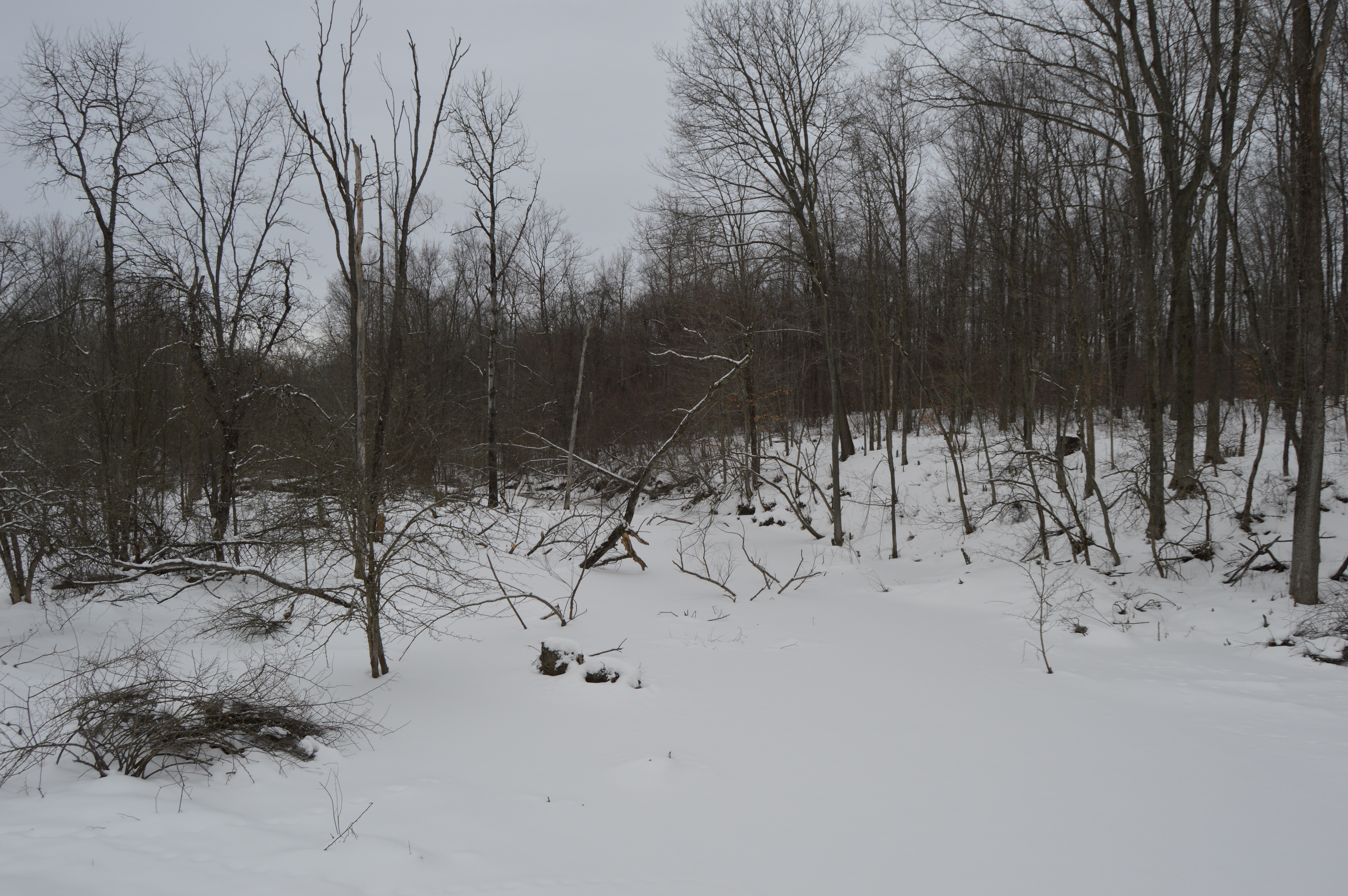
- Stone Run, frozen by winter weather

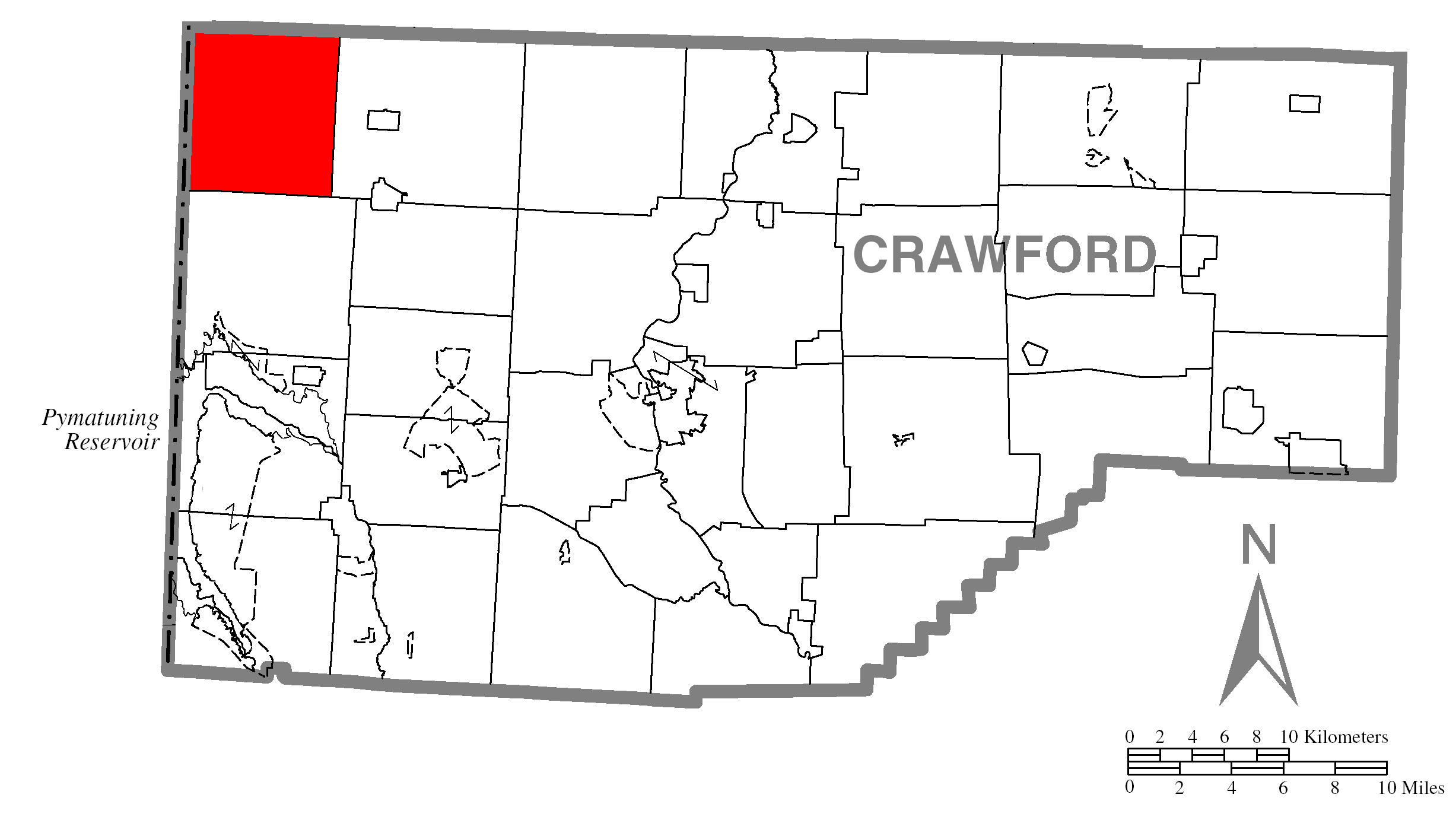
- Location of Beaver Township in Crawford County

- Location of Crawford County in Pennsylvania
- Country: United States
- State: Pennsylvania
- County: Crawford

Area
  - Total: 36.65 sq mi (94.92 km^{2})
  - Land: 36.65 sq mi (94.92 km^{2})
  - Water: 0 sq mi (0.00 km^{2})
- Highest elevation (Southeast of Palmer, Pennsylvania): 1,170 ft (360 m)
- Lowest elevation (Conneaut Creek at Township line): 850 ft (260 m)

Population (2020)
  - Total: 793
  - Estimate (2024): 789
  - Density: 24/sq mi (9.1/km^{2})
- Time zone: UTC-4 (EST)
  - Summer (DST): UTC-5 (EDT)
- Area code: 814
- FIPS code: 42-039-04720
- Website: https://beavertwpcrawfordpa.org/

Beaver Township is a township in Crawford County, Pennsylvania, United States. The population was 793 at the 2020 census.

== Geography ==
Beaver Township is in the northwestern corner of Crawford County, bordered to the north by Erie County, and to the west by Ashtabula County, Ohio. According to the United States Census Bureau, the township has a total area of 36.6 square miles (94.9 km^{2}), all land. The unincorporated community of Beaver Center is at the center of the township.

== History ==
The area that became the township was first settled about 1797. On 9 July 1800 six townships were incorporated in the county, including: Beaver Township, Conneaut, Cussewago, Fairfield, Sadsbury, and Venango Township. In 1829 Beaver and Cussewago were reduced in area by the incorporation of Spring Township between them. Beaver Township has maintained the same borders since 1829.

=== Natural features ===
Geologic Province: Northwestern Glaciated Plateau
Lowest Elevation: 850 ft (260 m) where Conneaut Creek flows northward from the township.
Highest Elevation: 1,170 ft (360 m) at the southern township border, southwest of Palmer
Major Rivers/Streams and Watersheds: Conneaut Creek and Shenango River (southwestern part of township)
Minor Rivers/Streams and Watersheds: Conneaut Creek tributaries: Crazy Run and Stone Run West Branch Conneaut Creek tributaries: Mud Run, East Branch, and Middle Branch

    Paden Creek, a tributary of the Shenango River

Biological Diversity Areas: East Branch Conneaut Creek Headwaters BDA, Mud Run Wetland BDA, and West Branch Conneaut Creek BDA

== Demographics ==
Historical population
Census	Pop.	Note	%±
2000	903		—
2010	902		−0.1%
2020	793		−12.1%
2024 (est.)	789		−0.5%
U.S. Decennial Census

As of the census of 2000, there were 903 people, 316 households, and 241 families residing in the township. The population density was 24.6 people per square mile (9.5/km^{2}). There were 376 housing units at an average density of 10.2/sq mi (4.0/km^{2}). The racial makeup of the township was 97.79% White, 0.66% African American, 0.11% Native American, 0.33% Asian, and 1.11% from two or more races. Hispanic or Latino of any race were 0.11% of the population.

There were 316 households, out of which 38.6% had children under the age of 18 living with them, 62.3% were married couples living together, 6.0% had a female householder with no husband present, and 23.7% were non-families. 19.9% of all households were made up of individuals, and 6.6% had someone living alone who was 65 years of age or older. The average household size was 2.86 and the average family size was 3.26.

In the township the population was spread out, with 29.5% under the age of 18, 9.7% from 18 to 24, 30.0% from 25 to 44, 20.9% from 45 to 64, and 9.9% who were 65 years of age or older. The median age was 33 years. For every 100 females there were 109.0 males. For every 100 females age 18 and over, there were 107.5 males.

The median income for a household in the township was $26,818, and the median income for a family was $28,750. Males had a median income of $25,000 versus $17,604 for females. The per capita income for the township was $14,913. About 18.0% of families and 20.9% of the population were below the poverty line, including 28.9% of those under age 18 and 6.0% of those age 65 or over.
