= Ohio State Route 167 =

State highway in Ashtabula County, Ohio, US

State Route 167

- A red line indicating the path of SR 167

Route information
- Maintained by ODOT
- Length: 14.08 mi (22.66 km)
- Existed: 1923–present

Major junctions
- West end: SR 46 / SR 307 in Jefferson
- SR 11 near Jefferson; SR 7 in Pierpont
- East end: PA 198 near Pierpont

Location
- Country: United States
- State: Ohio
- Counties: Ashtabula

Highway system
- Ohio State Highway System; Interstate; US; State; Scenic
← SR 166	→ SR 168

State Route 167 (SR 167) is a 14.08-mile-long (22.66 km) east–west state highway in the northeastern portion of the U.S. state of Ohio. Its western terminus is at the northern end of the SR 46 and SR 307 concurrency in Jefferson, and its eastern terminus is at the Pennsylvania state line about 13 miles (21 km) south of Conneaut, where Pennsylvania Route 198 (PA 198) continues east. The route was designated in 1923, and has been rerouted three times since.

== Route description ==
SR 167 starts at SR 46/307, on the northern edge of Jefferson. The route, known as Beech Street, travels east and crosses a railroad owned by Ashtabula, Carson & Jefferson. SR 167 shifts slightly northeastward, and three miles later, it meets SR 11 at a diamond interchange. Later, the road intersects SR 193 in the middle of Denmark Township. After intersecting Stanhope–Kelloggsville Road, the route moves north a bit, then slowly moves back south and continues eastward. At the small village of Pierpont, SR 167 becomes concurrent with SR 7, and heads north for 1 mile (1.6 km). After that, the route starts heading east again, and becomes PA 198 after crossing the Ohio–Pennsylvania state line. The majority of the road is next to farmland. The highest traffic count is in Jefferson, where 2,260 vehicles travel on the road on average. The lowest traffic count is near the state line, where 330 vehicles travel on the road on average.

== History ==
SR 167 was designated in 1923 as a short connector from SR 7 to the Pennsylvania state line east of Richmond Center, an unincorporated village. In 1928, the route was rerouted from Jefferson to the Pennsylvania state line east of Pierpoint. The new western terminus was in SR 46/84 (now SR 307) in Jefferson, and the eastern terminus was the state line, north of Richmond Center. The route became concurrent with US 6 beginning in 1932, between SR 7 and the Pennsylvania state line. In 1939, the highway was rerouted north of its concurrency with US 6, replacing SR 538. In about 1969, SR 11 opened at SR 167 as an at-grade intersection, and seven years later, an interchange replaced the intersection. Between 1979 and 1981, the route was rerouted to the north side of Jefferson to its current alignment.

== Major intersections ==
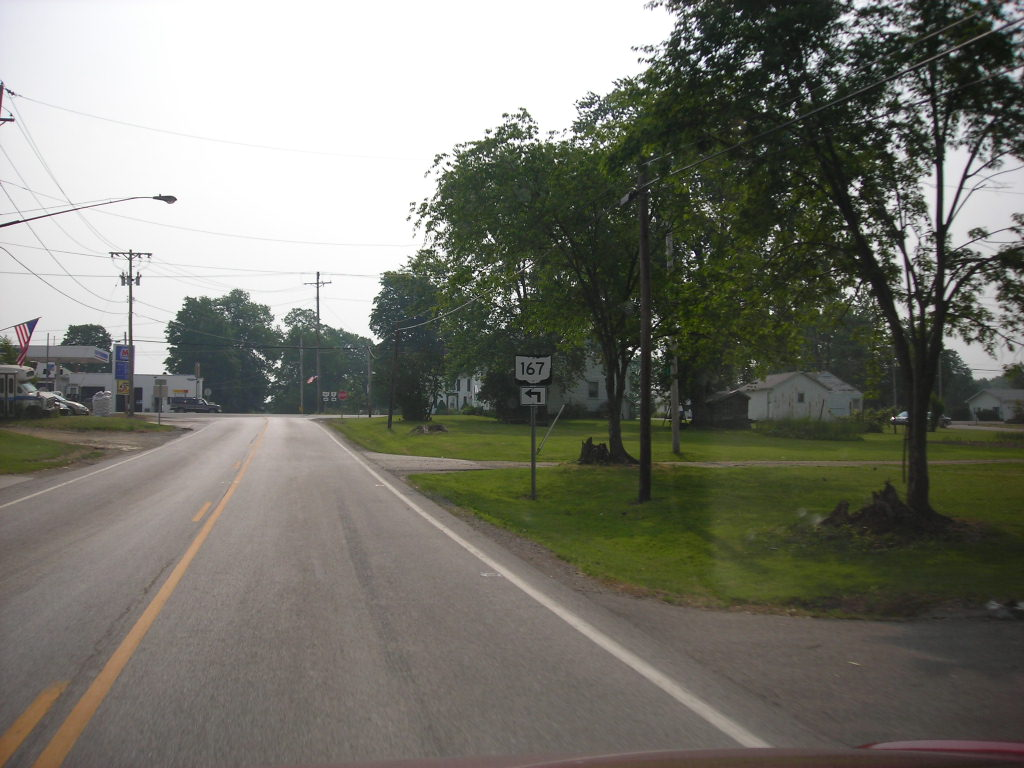
SR 167 near Pierpont

The entire route is in Ashtabula County.

Location	mi	km	Destinations	Notes
Jefferson	0.00	0.00	SR 46 / SR 307	Western terminus of SR 167
Denmark Township	2.99– 3.15	4.81– 5.07	SR 11 – Ashtabula, Youngstown	Diamond interchange
Denmark Township	5.35	8.61	SR 193	At-grade intersection
Pierpont Township	10.46	16.83	SR 7 south	Southern end of SR 7 concurrency
Pierpont Township	11.37	18.30	SR 7 north	Northern end of SR 7 concurrency
Pierpont Township	14.08	22.66	PA 198 east	Pennsylvania state line
1.000 mi = 1.609 km; 1.000 km = 0.621 mi: Concurrency terminus
