= Conneautville, Pennsylvania =

Borough in Pennsylvania, US

- Borough
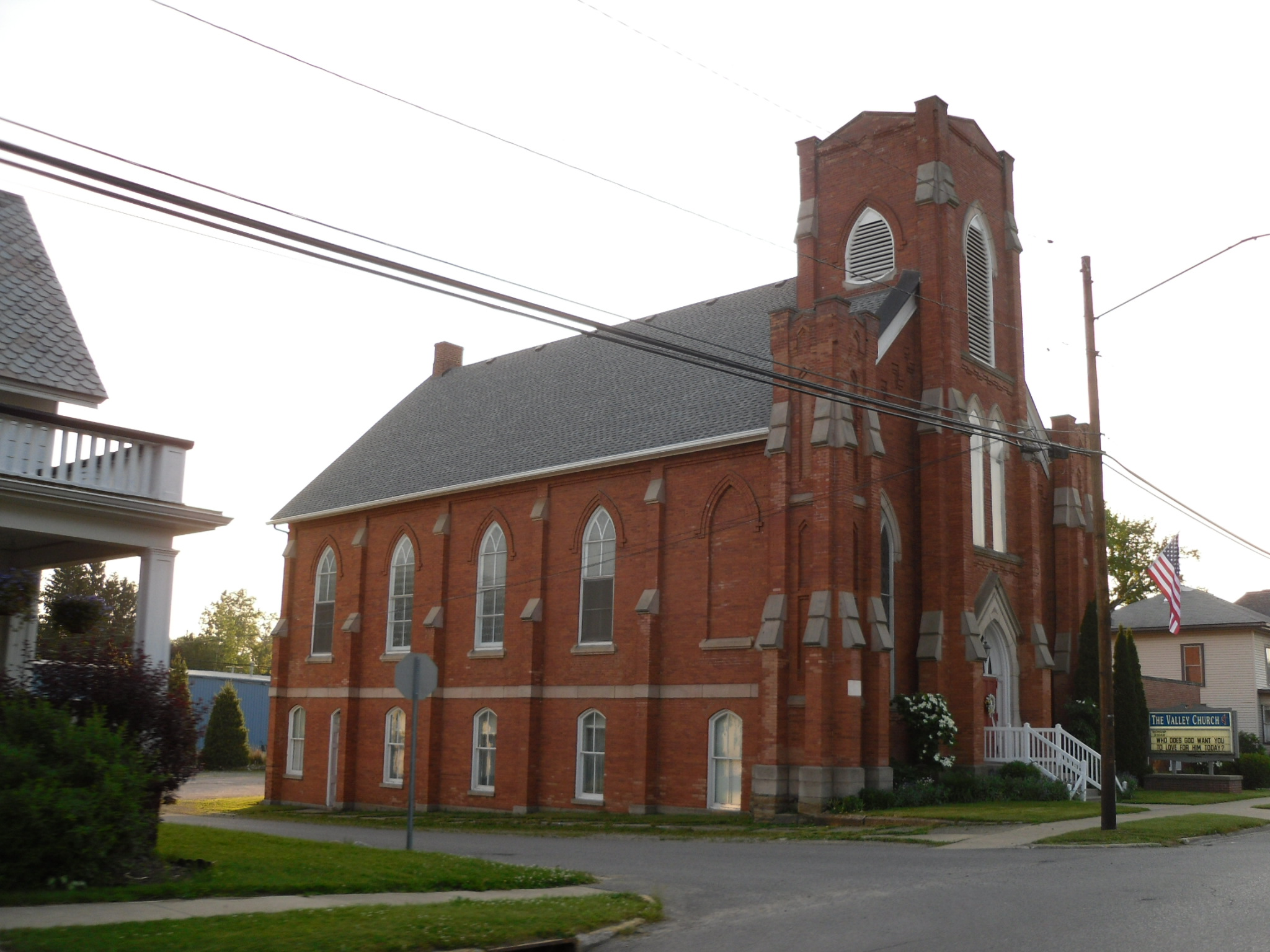
- Valley Church
- Etymology: Conneautee, Seneca word
- Location of Conneautville in Crawford County, Pennsylvania.

- Location of Conneautville in Pennsylvania
- Coordinates: 41°45′29″N 80°22′10″W
- Country: United States
- State: Pennsylvania
- County: Crawford
- Founded: 1843

Area
  - Total: 1.12 sq mi (2.90 km^{2})
  - Land: 1.11 sq mi (2.88 km^{2})
  - Water: 0.0039 sq mi (0.01 km^{2})
- Elevation (middle of borough): 949 ft (289 m)
- Highest elevation (east side of borough): 1,100 ft (340 m)
- Lowest elevation (Conneaut Creek): 920 ft (280 m)

Population (2020)
  - Total: 736
  - Estimate (2022): 729
  - Density: 664.3/sq mi (256.47/km^{2})
- Time zone: UTC-4 (EST)
  - Summer (DST): UTC-5 (EDT)
- ZIP code: 16406
- Area code: 814
- FIPS code: 42-15760

Conneautville is a borough in Crawford County, Pennsylvania, United States, situated along Conneaut Creek. The population was 736 at the 2020 census, down from 774 at the 2010 census.

== History ==
Conneautville was founded in 1814 by Alexander Power, a surveyor and engineer. Conneautville was first called "Powerstown" or made reference to as "Power's Tract". Power wanted it called "Conneautville" after the Seneca name Conneaut or Conneautee, meaning "Snow Place" according to one interpretation.

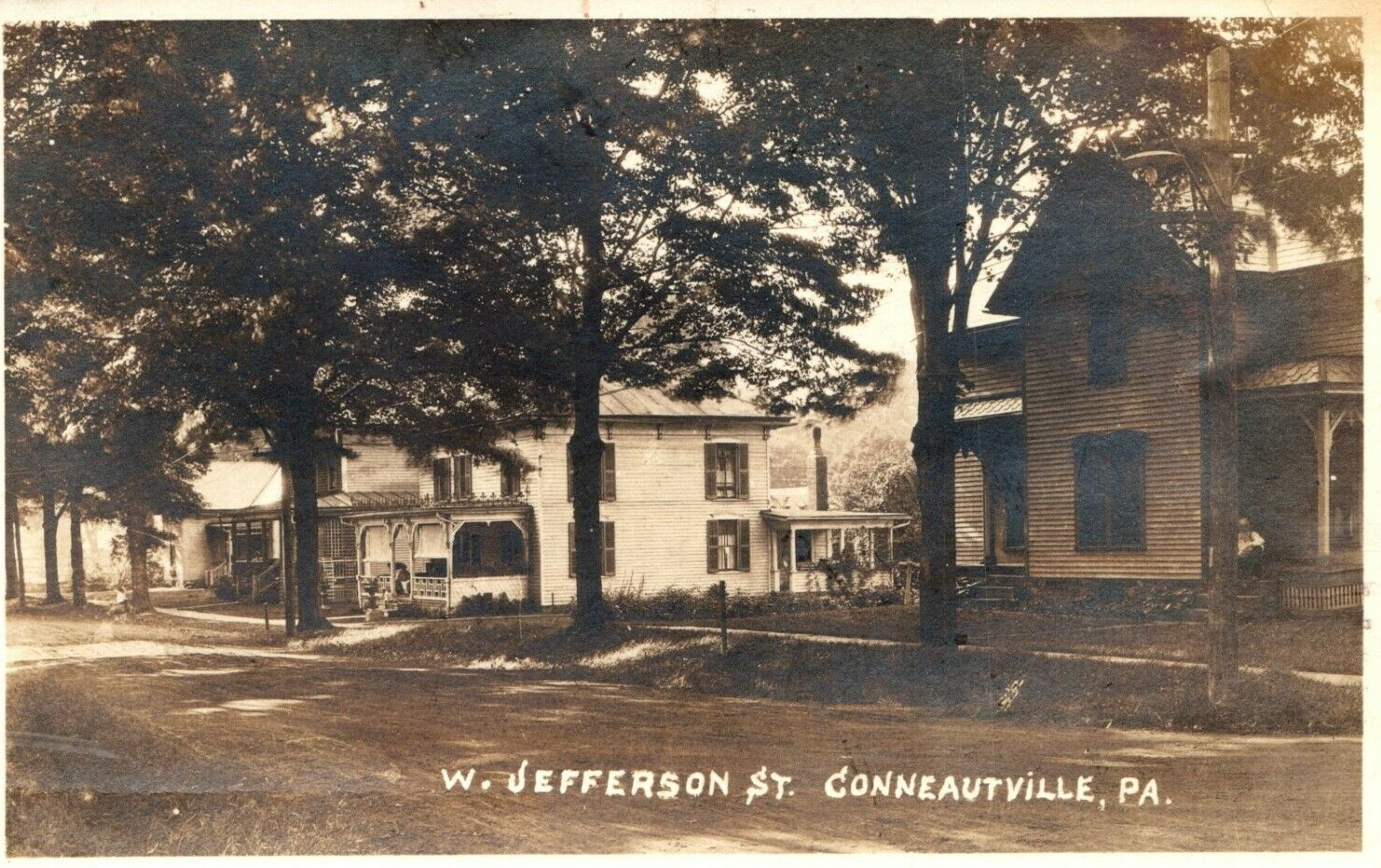
West Jefferson Street, Conneautvile, PA in a postcard sent on August 27, 1923

== Geography ==
Conneautville is in northwestern Crawford County at 41°45′29″N 80°22′10″W (41.758019, -80.369470), in the valley of Conneaut Creek, which flows north and west to Lake Erie. The borough is bordered by Spring Township to the north and Summerhill Township to the south.

Pennsylvania Route 18 passes through the center of the borough, leading north 10 miles (16 km) to Albion and south 11 miles (18 km) to Conneaut Lake. Pennsylvania Route 198 leads west from Conneautville 8 miles (13 km) to the Ohio border and east 9 miles (14 km) to Interstate 79 near Saegertown.

According to the United States Census Bureau, Conneautville has a total area of 1.0 square mile (2.7 km^{2}), of which 0.004 square miles (0.01 km^{2}), or 0.55%, is water.

== Demographics ==
Historical population
Census	Pop.	Note	%±
1850	787		—
1860	964		22.5%
1870	1,000		3.7%
1880	941		−5.9%
1890	757		−19.6%
1900	920		21.5%
1910	867		−5.8%
1920	969		11.8%
1930	927		−4.3%
1940	965		4.1%
1950	1,177		22.0%
1960	1,100		−6.5%
1970	1,032		−6.2%
1980	971		−5.9%
1990	822		−15.3%
2000	848		3.2%
2010	774		−8.7%
2020	739		−4.5%
2022 (est.)	729	▼	−1.4%

At the census of 2000, there were 848 people, 352 households and 229 families in the borough. The population density was 778.7 inhabitants per square mile (300.7/km^{2}). There were 377 housing units at an average of 346.2 per square mile (133.5/km^{2}). The racial makeup was 98.47% White, 0.24% African American, 0.24% Native American, 0.12% Asian, 0.12% from other races, and 0.83% from two or more races. Hispanic or Latino of any race were 0.59% of the population.

There were 352 households, of which 30.1% had children under 18 with them, 52.0% were married couples living together, 8.2% had a female householder with no husband present, and 34.7% were non-families. 30.7% of all households were made up of individuals, and 17.3% had someone living alone 65 or older. The average household size was 2.41 and the average family size 3.03.

In the borough 24.6% were under 18, 6.6% from 18 to 24, 28.7% from 25 to 44, 22.4% from 45 to 64, and 17.7% 65 or older. The median was 40. For every 100 females there were 88.9 males. For every 100 females age 18 and over, there were 85.8 males.

The median household income was $35,083, and the median family income was $40,833. Males had a median income of $30,481 versus $19,583 for females. The per capita income for the borough was $17,087. 4.1% of families and 7.4% of the population were below the poverty line, including 10.0% of those under 18 and 11.9% of those 65 or over.

== Notable person ==
- Effie Louise Power (1873–1969), a children's librarian, educator, author and storyteller was born in Conneautville.
