= Edward Saeger House =

Historic house in Pennsylvania, United States

- U.S. National Register of Historic Places
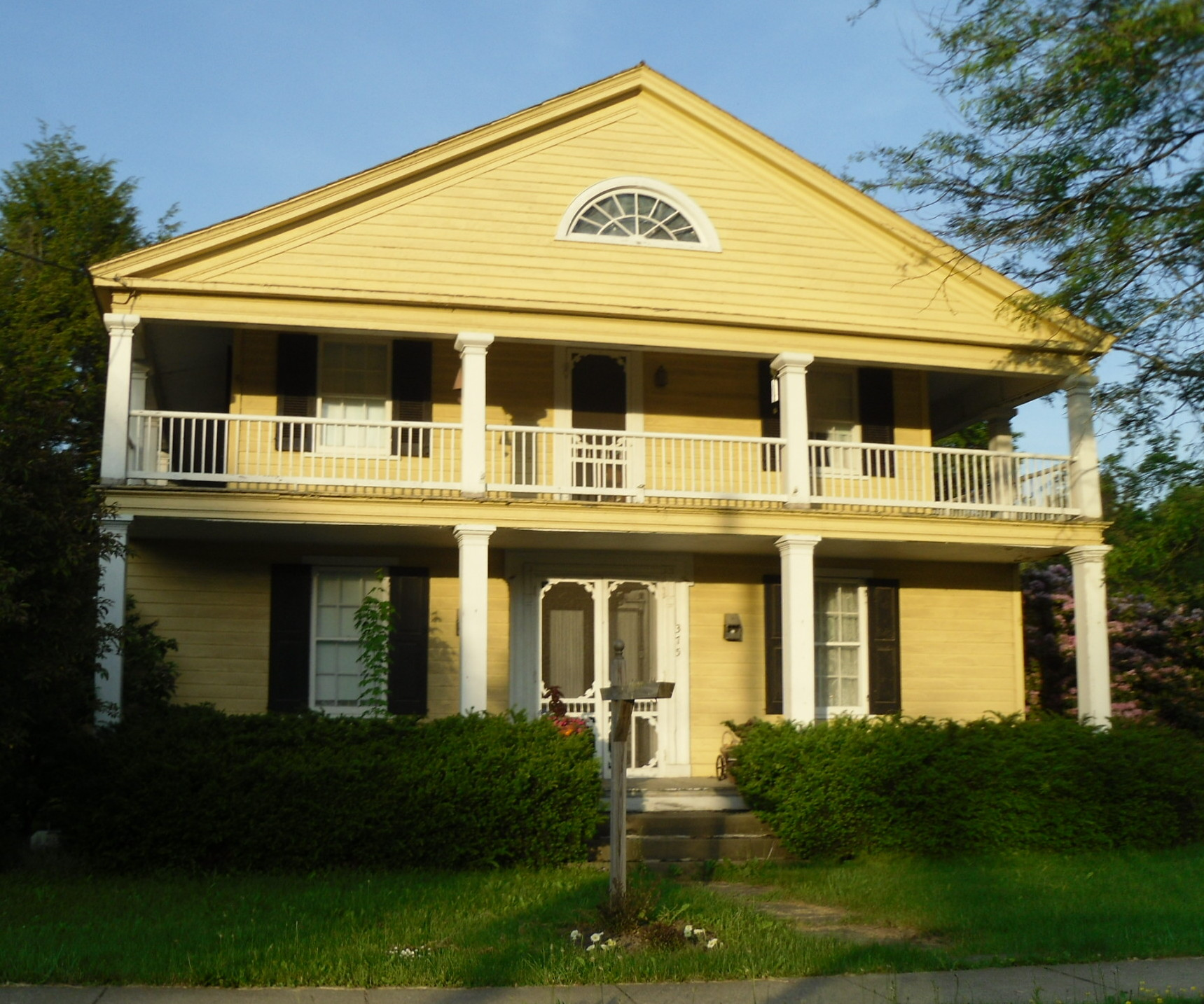
- Edward Saeger House, May 2010

- Location within Pennsylvania Location within the United States
- Location: 375 Main St., Saegertown, Pennsylvania
- Coordinates: 41°43′7″N 80°8′53″W
- Area: 0.3 acres (0.12 ha)
- Built: c. 1845
- Built by: Edward Saeger
- Architectural style: Greek Revival
- NRHP reference No.: 80003479
- Added to NRHP: August 22, 1980

Edward Saeger House is a historic home located at Saegertown, Crawford County, Pennsylvania. It was built about 1845, and is a large, two-story squarish clapboard clad frame dwelling on a stone foundation in the Greek Revival style. The front facade features a pedimented gable with a distinctive lunette window and second story verandah. An addition was built about 1866.

It was added to the National Register of Historic Places in 1980.
