= Pierpont, Ohio =

Unincorporated community in Ohio, U.S.

Coordinates: 41°44′57″N 80°34′06″W

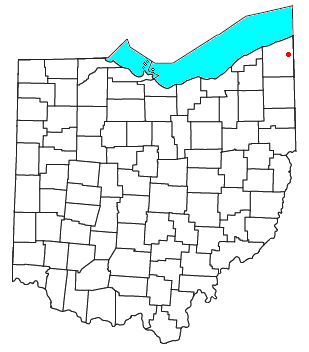
Location of Pierpont, Ohio

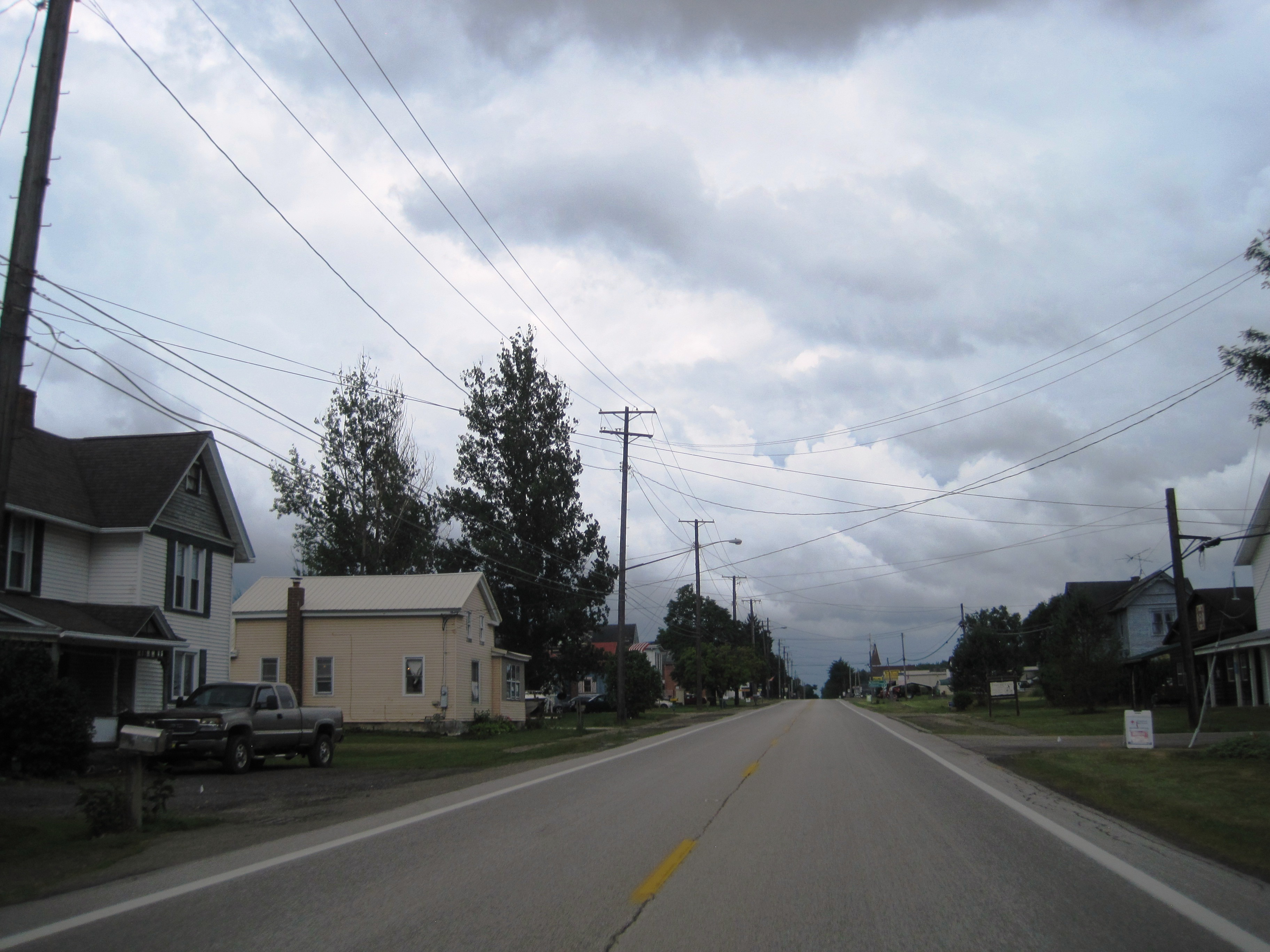
Community of Pierpont along SR 7/SR 167

Pierpont is an unincorporated community in central Pierpont Township, Ashtabula County, Ohio, United States. It has a post office with the ZIP code 44082. Served by Area Code 440 Exchange 577. Pierpont is at the intersection of State Routes 7 and 167.

The community has the name of Pierpont Edwards, a Connecticut Land Company agent.
