= Hayfield Township, Crawford County, Pennsylvania =

Township in Pennsylvania, US

Coordinates: 41°45′06″N 80°15′59″W

- Township
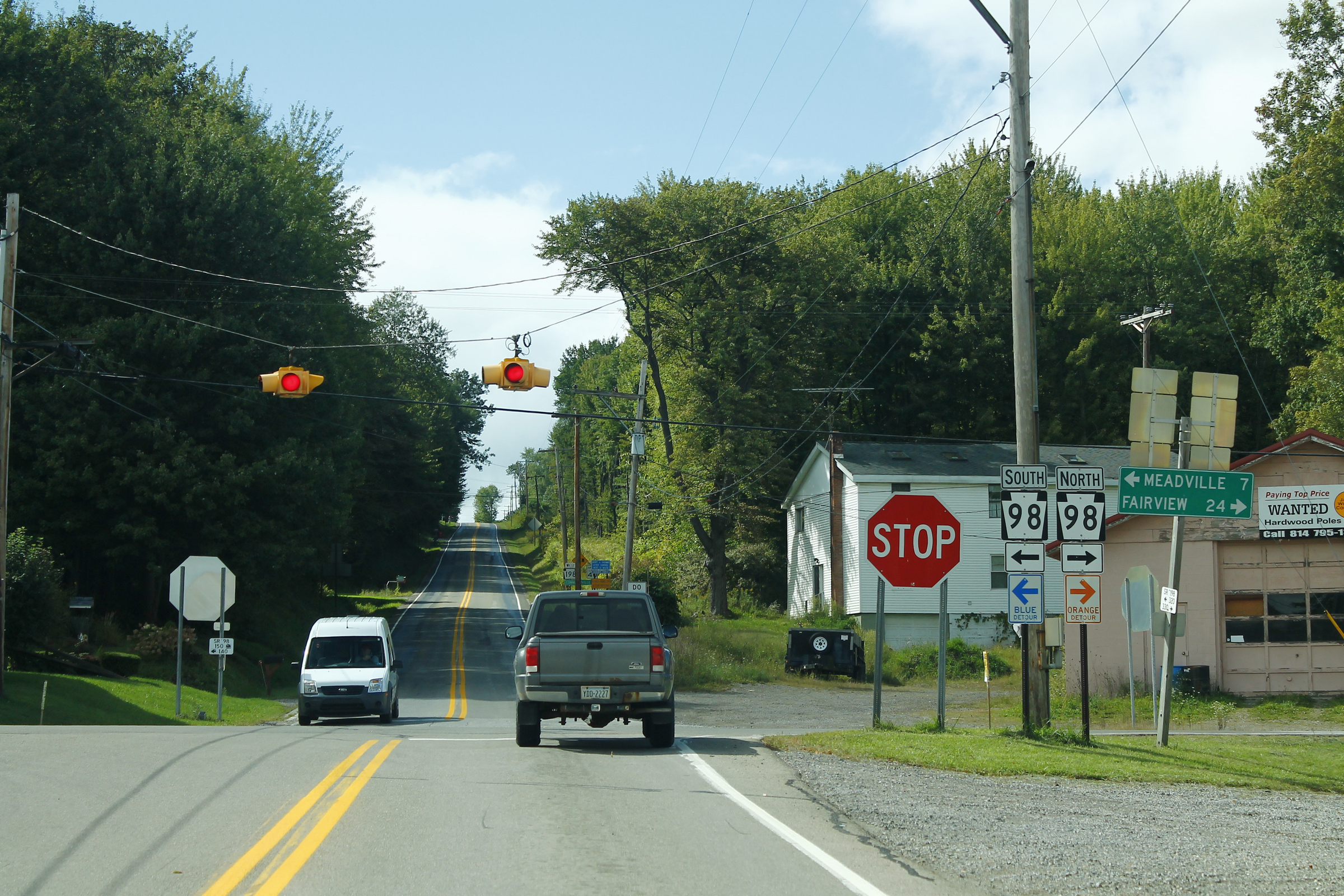
- Littles Corners, a village in Hayfield Township at the intersection of PA 98 and PA 198

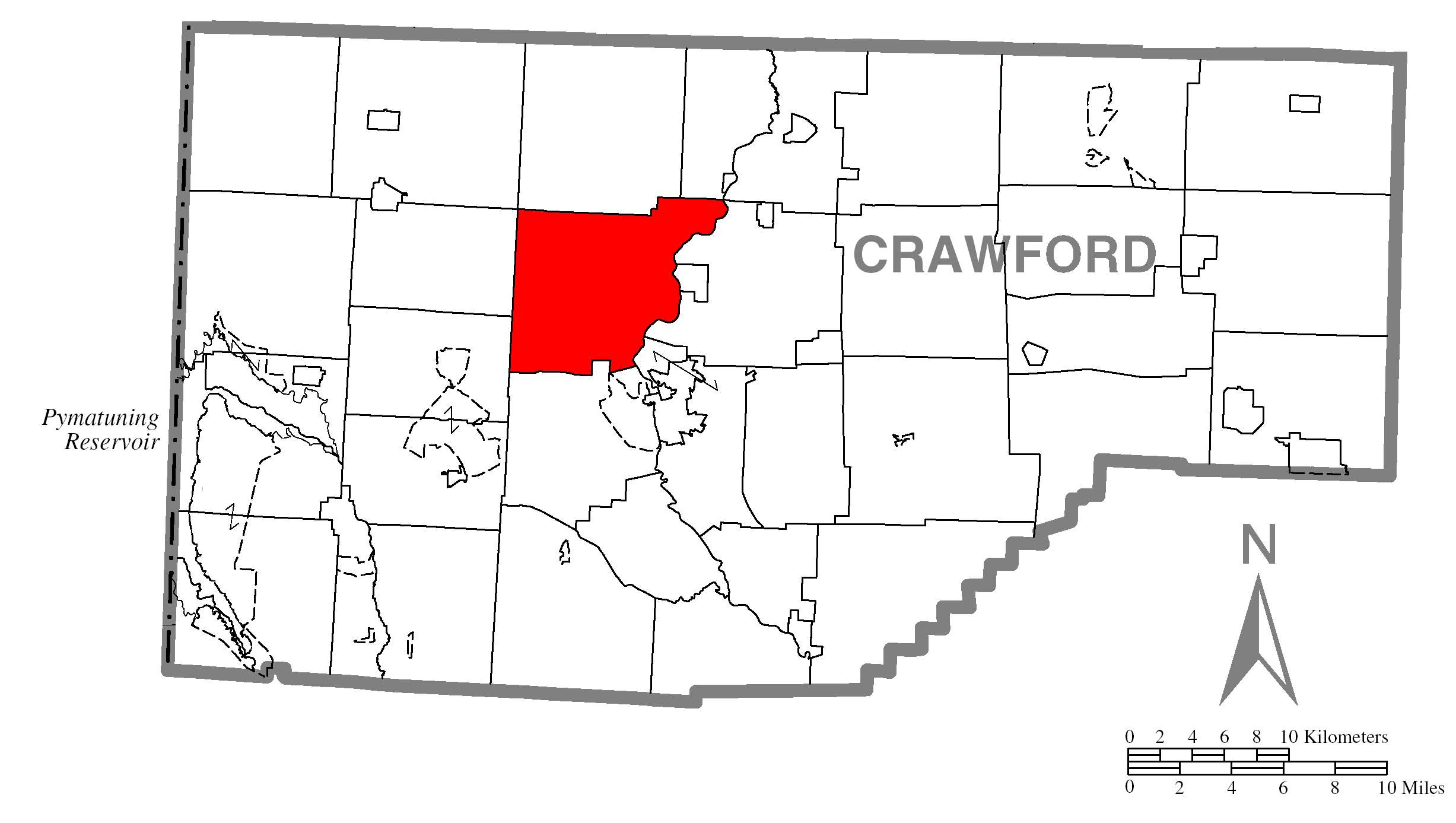
- Location of Hayfield Township in Crawford County

- Location of Crawford County in Pennsylvania
- Country: United States
- State: Pennsylvania
- County: Crawford County

Area
  - Total: 38.90 sq mi (100.76 km^{2})
  - Land: 38.84 sq mi (100.60 km^{2})
  - Water: 0.062 sq mi (0.16 km^{2})
- Highest elevation (north side of Round Top): 1,460 ft (450 m)
- Lowest elevation (French Creek): 1,070 ft (330 m)

Population (2020)
  - Total: 2,774 ▼
  - Estimate (2023): 2,739
  - Density: 73.8/sq mi (28.49/km^{2})
- Time zone: UTC-4 (EST)
  - Summer (DST): UTC-5 (EDT)
- Area code: 814
- FIPS code: 42-039-33256

Hayfield Township is a township in Crawford County, Pennsylvania, United States. The population was 2,774 at the 2020 census, down from 2,940 at the 2010 census.

== Geography ==
Hayfield Township is located slightly northwest of the center of Crawford County. It is bordered to the east by French Creek, a south-flowing tributary of the Allegheny River. The borough of Saegertown borders the township to the east across French Creek. Cussewago Creek, a tributary of French Creek, flows southward through the west side of the township.

Interstate 79 crosses the center of the township from north to south, with access from Exit 154 (Pennsylvania Route 198), 3 miles (5 km) west of Saegertown. From Exit 154, I-79 leads north 32 miles (51 km) to Erie and south 95 miles (153 km) to Pittsburgh.

According to the United States Census Bureau, the township has a total area of 38.9 square miles (101 km^{2}), of which 38.9 square miles (101 km^{2}) is land and 0.1 square miles (0.26 km^{2}) (0.15%) is water.

=== Natural Features ===
Geologic Province: Northwestern Glaciated Plateau
Lowest Elevation: 1,070 ft (330 m) French Creek where it flows out of township.
Highest Elevation: 1,460 ft (450 m) high point on north side of Round top.
Major Rivers/Streams and Watersheds: French Creek (forms eastern border), Cussewago Creek, and Conneaut Outlet
Minor Rivers/Streams and Watersheds:

- Conneaut Outlet tributaries: Watson Run
- Cussewago Creek tributaries: unnamed tributaries
- French Creek tributaries: Wolf Run and its tributary, Brookhouser Creek

Biological Diversity Areas: Cussewago Creek at Onspaugh Corners BDA, Cussewago Creek-Coons Valley BDA, French Creek BDA
Landscape Conservation Areas: French Creek LCA

== Demographics ==
Historical population
Census	Pop.	Note	%±
2000	3,092		—
2010	2,940		−4.9%
2020	2,774		−5.6%
2024 (est.)	2,739		−1.3%
U.S. Decennial Census

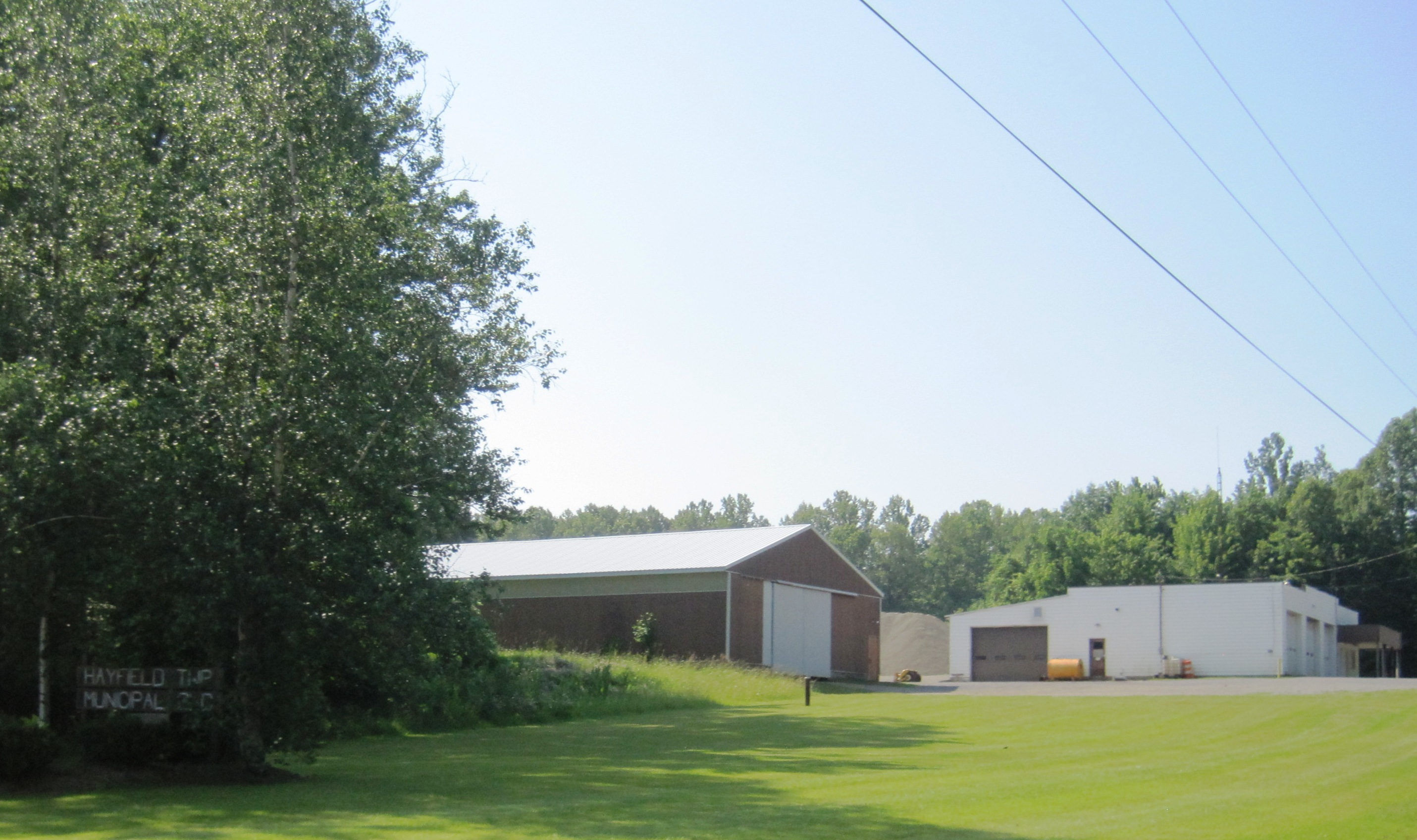
Hayfield Township Municipal Building

As of the census of 2000, there were 3,092 people, 1,155 households, and 890 families residing in the township. The population density was 79.6 inhabitants per square mile (30.7/km^{2}). There were 1,249 housing units at an average density of 32.1 per square mile (12.4/km^{2}). The racial makeup of the township was 99.06% White, 0.06% African American, 0.19% Native American, 0.23% Asian, 0.06% from other races, and 0.39% from two or more races. Hispanic or Latino of any race were 0.36% of the population.

There were 1,155 households, out of which 34.6% had children under the age of 18 living with them, 64.5% were married couples living together, 8.2% had a female householder with no husband present, and 22.9% were non-families. 19.3% of all households were made up of individuals, and 6.9% had someone living alone who was 65 years of age or older. The average household size was 2.68 and the average family size was 3.04.

In the township the population was spread out, with 26.6% under the age of 18, 6.8% from 18 to 24, 29.2% from 25 to 44, 25.5% from 45 to 64, and 11.9% who were 65 years of age or older. The median age was 38 years. For every 100 females, there were 103.2 males. For every 100 females age 18 and over, there were 100.1 males.

The median income for a household in the township was $39,702, and the median income for a family was $45,871. Males had a median income of $36,473 versus $21,739 for females. The per capita income for the township was $16,973. About 5.7% of families and 6.6% of the population were below the poverty line, including 9.9% of those under age 18 and 5.0% of those age 65 or over.
