= Blooming Valley, Pennsylvania =

Borough in Pennsylvania, US

- Borough
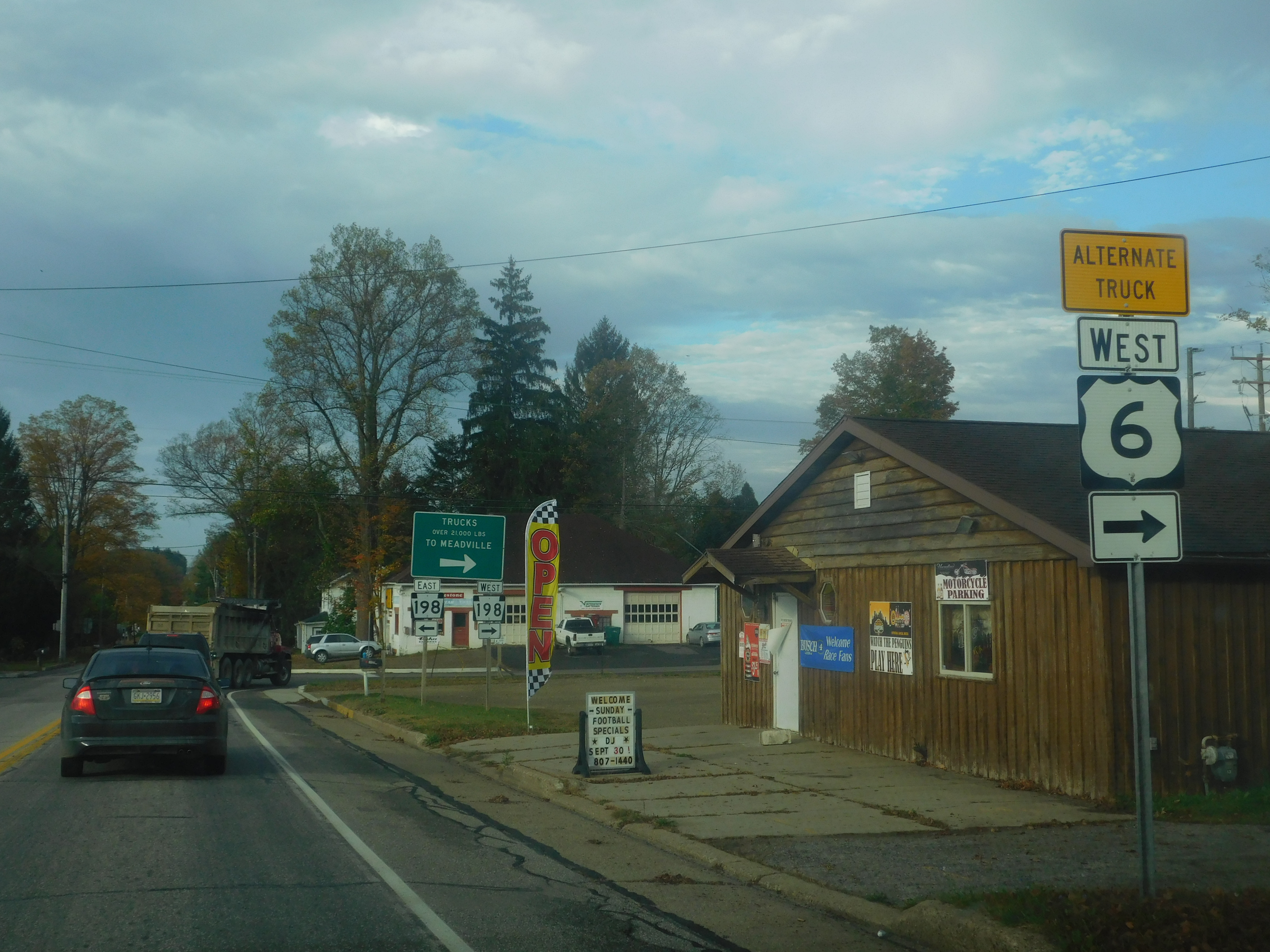
- Intersection of PA 77 and PA 198 in Blooming Valley

- Location of Blooming Valley in Crawford County, Pennsylvania.

- Location of Blooming Valley in Pennsylvania
- Coordinates: 41°40′49″N 80°2′32″W
- Country: United States
- State: Pennsylvania
- County: Crawford County
- Founded: 1845

Area
  - Total: 2.04 sq mi (5.28 km^{2})
  - Land: 2.02 sq mi (5.23 km^{2})
  - Water: 0.023 sq mi (0.06 km^{2})
- Elevation (middle of borough): 1,285 ft (392 m)
- Highest elevation (East side of borough): 1,530 ft (470 m)
- Lowest elevation (tributary to Woodcock Creek): 1,220 ft (370 m)

Population (2020)
  - Total: 342
  - Estimate (2022): 342
  - Density: 170.4/sq mi (65.81/km^{2})
- Time zone: UTC-4 (EST)
  - Summer (DST): UTC-5 (EDT)
- Area code: 814
- FIPS code: 42-07120

Blooming Valley is a borough in Crawford County, Pennsylvania, United States. The population was 342 at the 2020 census, up from 337 at the 2010 census.

== Geography ==
Blooming Valley is located near the geographic center of Crawford County at 41°40′49″N 80°2′32″W (41.680217, -80.042107). It is bordered to the north and west by Woodcock Township, to the east by Richmond and Randolph townships, and to the south by East Mead Township.

Pennsylvania Routes 77 and 198 intersect in the center of town. PA 77 leads southwest 6 miles (10 km) to Meadville, the county seat, and northeast 30 miles (48 km) to Corry. PA 198 leads northwest 7 miles (11 km) to Saegertown and southeast 6 miles (10 km) to Guys Mills.

According to the United States Census Bureau, the borough has a total area of 1.97 square miles (5.09 km^{2}), of which 1.94 square miles (5.03 km^{2}) is land and 0.02 square miles (0.06 km^{2}), or 1.13%, is water.

=== Natural features ===
The Borough of Blooming Valley lies on the divide between Blooming Valley Run and Sugar Creek, whose waters eventually flow to French Creek. The two streams are separated by a swampy area. The elevation of the borough ranges from 1,219 ft (372 m) at Blooming Valley Run to 1,530 ft (470 m) near the eastern boundary.

== Demographics ==
Historical population
Census	Pop.	Note	%±
1870	209		—
1880	232		11.0%
1890	206		−11.2%
1900	177		−14.1%
1910	150		−15.3%
1920	141		−6.0%
1930	195		38.3%
1940	218		11.8%
1950	256		17.4%
1960	296		15.6%
1970	358		20.9%
1980	374		4.5%
1990	391		4.5%
2000	378		−3.3%
2010	337		−10.8%
2020	344		2.1%
2022 (est.)	342	▼	−0.6%

As of the census of 2000, there were 378 people, 144 households, and 109 families residing in the borough. The population density was 194.5 inhabitants per square mile (75.1/km^{2}). There were 156 housing units at an average density of 80.3 per square mile (31.0/km^{2}). The racial makeup of the borough was 98.94% White, 0.79% African American, and 0.26% from two or more races.

There were 144 households, out of which 35.4% had children under the age of 18 living with them, 65.3% were married couples living together, 9.0% had a female householder with no husband present, and 24.3% were non-families. 20.8% of all households were made up of individuals, and 9.0% had someone living alone who was 65 years of age or older. The average household size was 2.63 and the average family size was 3.05.

In the borough the population was spread out, with 27.5% under the age of 18, 3.7% from 18 to 24, 28.3% from 25 to 44, 24.6% from 45 to 64, and 15.9% who were 65 years of age or older. The median age was 38 years. For every 100 females there were 108.8 males. For every 100 females age 18 and over, there were 101.5 males.

The median income for a household in the borough was $46,944, and the median income for a family was $48,750. Males had a median income of $40,139 versus $21,458 for females. The per capita income for the borough was $17,334. About 1.8% of families and 3.1% of the population were below the poverty line, including 1.4% of those under age 18 and none of those age 65 or over.
