= Summerhill Township, Crawford County, Pennsylvania =

Township in Pennsylvania, US

Coordinates: 41°45′06″N 80°19′59″W

- Township
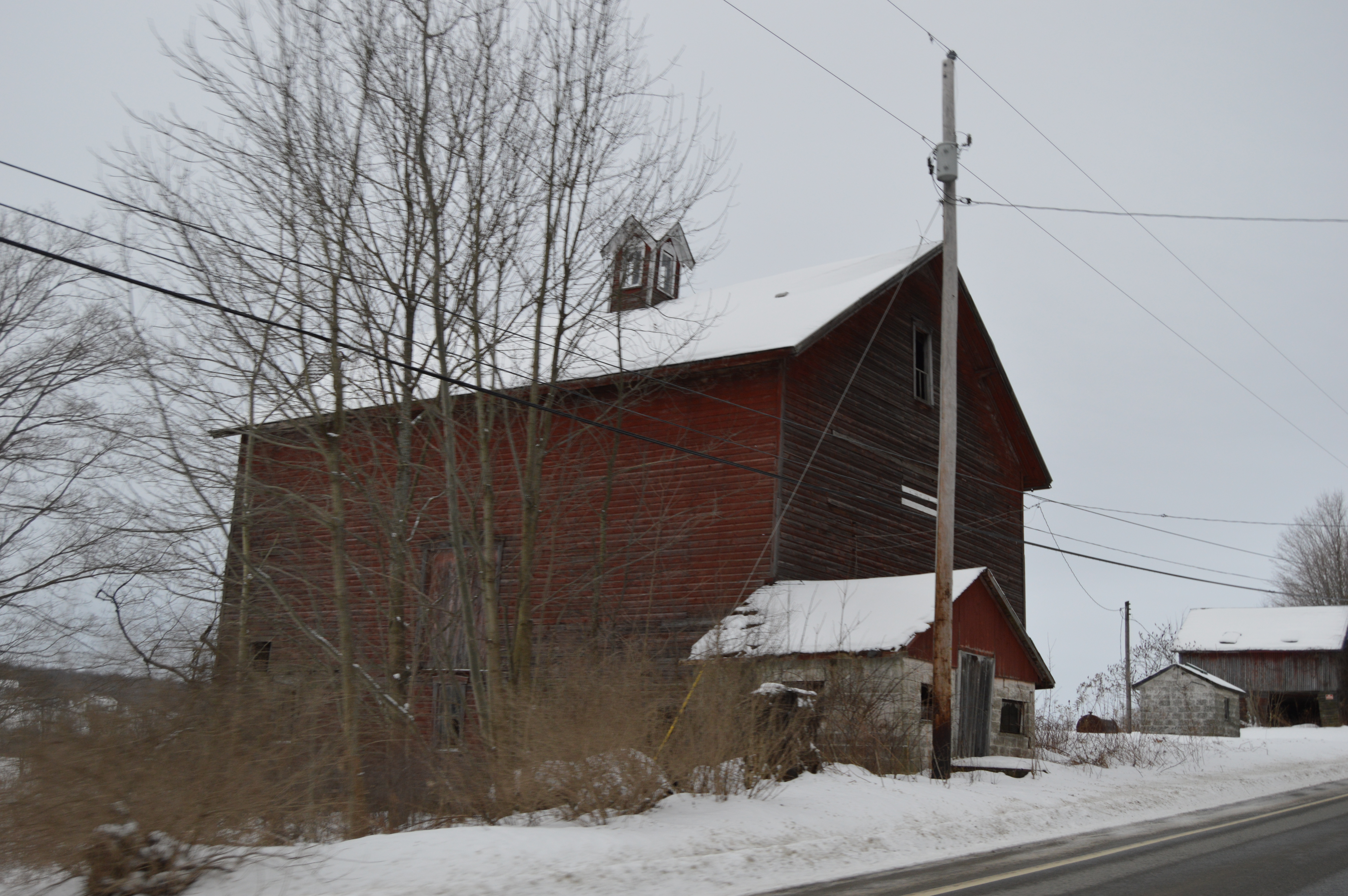
- Barn on Pennsylvania Route 18

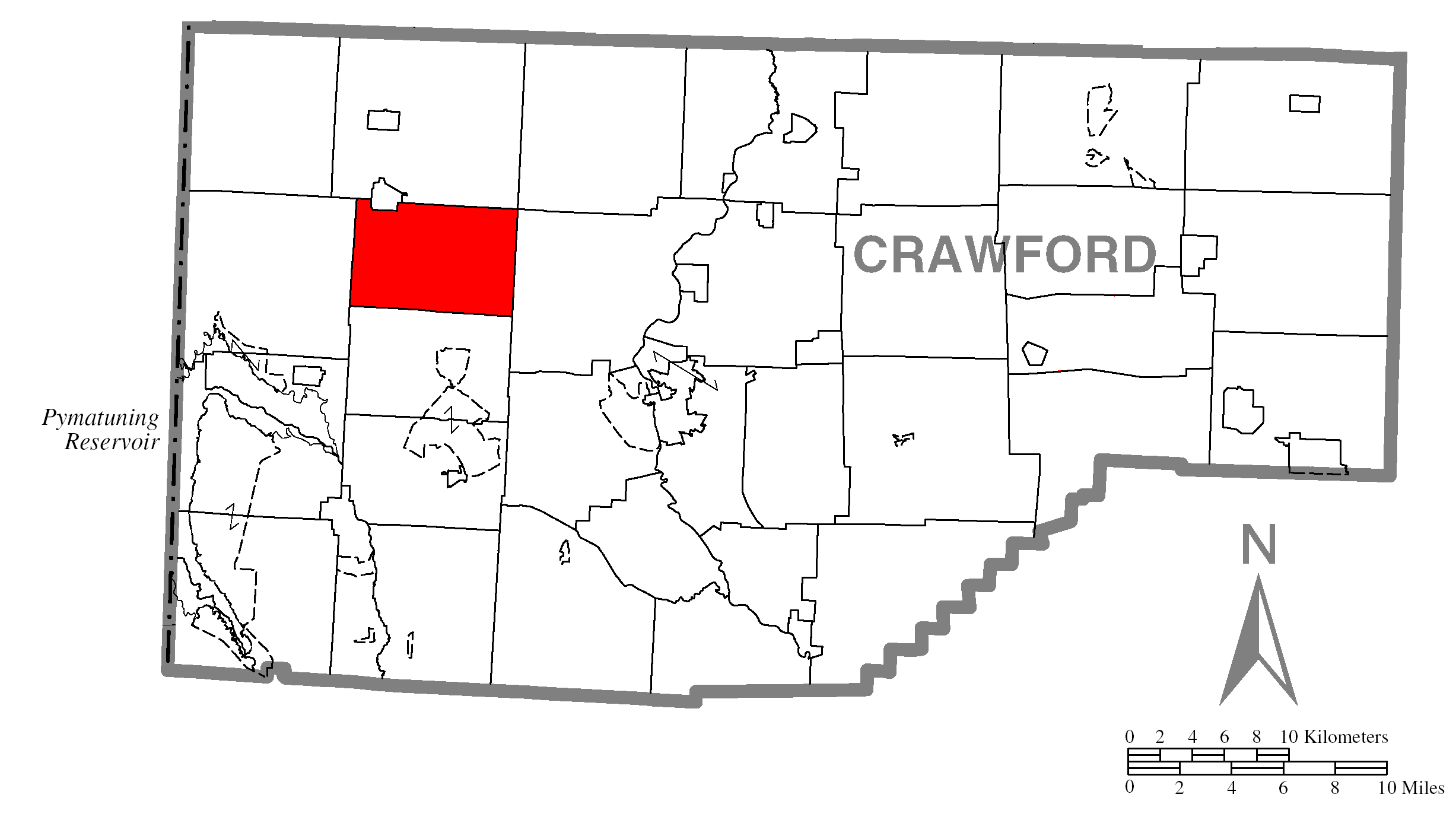
- Location of Summerhill Township in Crawford County

- Location of Crawford County in Pennsylvania
- Country: United States
- State: Pennsylvania
- County: Crawford County

Area
  - Total: 25.40 sq mi (65.79 km^{2})
  - Land: 25.38 sq mi (65.74 km^{2})
  - Water: 0.019 sq mi (0.05 km^{2})
- Highest elevation (southeast corner of township): 1,410 ft (430 m)
- Lowest elevation (Conneaut Creek): 940 ft (290 m)

Population (2020)
  - Total: 1,200 ▼
  - Estimate (2024): 1,201
  - Density: 47.5/sq mi (18.33/km^{2})
- Time zone: UTC-4 (EST)
  - Summer (DST): UTC-5 (EDT)
- Area code: 814
- FIPS code: 42-039-75160

Summerhill Township is a township in Crawford County, Pennsylvania, United States. The population was 1,200 at the 2020 census, down from 1,236 at the 2010 census.

== Geography ==
Summerhill Township is in western Crawford County. The borough of Conneautville, a separate municipality, is along the township's northern border. Conneaut Creek, a tributary of Lake Erie, flows from south to north through the western part of the township. According to the United States Census Bureau, the township has a total area of 25.4 square miles (65.8 km^{2}), of which 0.02 square miles (0.05 km^{2}), or 0.08%, is water.

== Demographics ==
Historical population
Census	Pop.	Note	%±
2000	1,350		—
2010	1,236		−8.4%
2020	1,200		−2.9%
2024 (est.)	1,201		0.1%
U.S. Decennial Census

As of the census of 2000, there were 1,350 people, 427 households, and 315 families residing in the township. The population density was 53.1 inhabitants per square mile (20.5/km^{2}). There were 518 housing units at an average density of 20.4/sq mi (7.9/km^{2}). The racial makeup of the township was 98.96% White, 0.52% African American, 0.22% Native American, and 0.30% from two or more races.

There were 427 households, out of which 34.4% had children under the age of 18 living with them, 57.4% were married couples living together, 11.5% had a female householder with no husband present, and 26.0% were non-families. 21.8% of all households were made up of individuals, and 10.8% had someone living alone who was 65 years of age or older. The average household size was 2.71 and the average family size was 3.13.

In the township the population was spread out, with 24.2% under the age of 18, 6.4% from 18 to 24, 24.3% from 25 to 44, 21.8% from 45 to 64, and 23.3% who were 65 years of age or older. The median age was 42 years. For every 100 females there were 90.7 males. For every 100 females age 18 and over, there were 86.0 males.

The median income for a household in the township was $30,000, and the median income for a family was $35,714. Males had a median income of $26,141 versus $17,465 for females. The per capita income for the township was $13,176. About 10.1% of families and 13.8% of the population were below the poverty line, including 22.6% of those under age 18 and 16.8% of those age 65 or over.
