= Guys Mills, Pennsylvania =

Unincorporated community in Pennsylvania, US

- Census-designated place
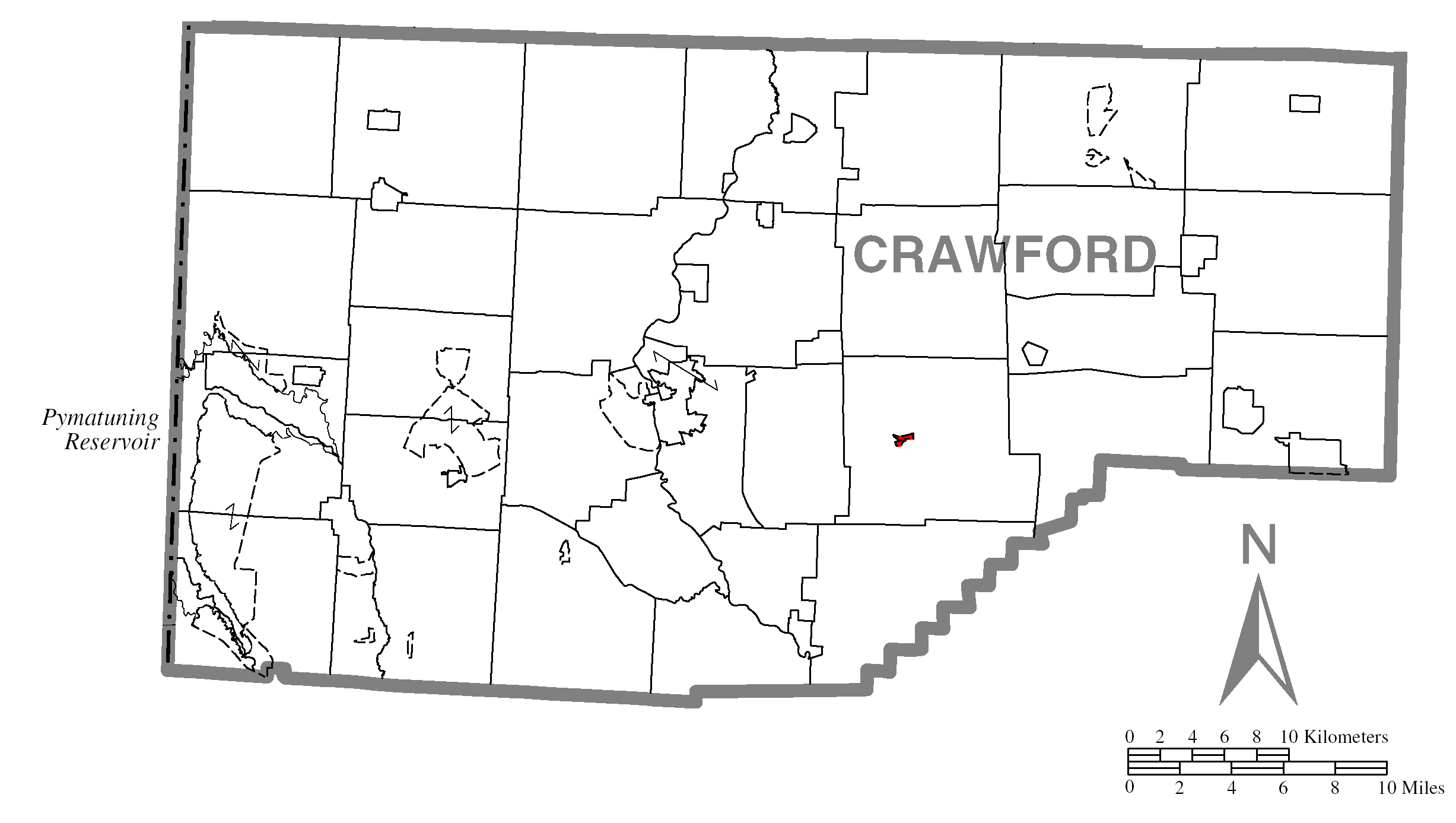
- Location of Guys Mills in Crawford County

- Location of Crawford County in Pennsylvania
- Coordinates: 41°37′51″N 79°58′35″W
- Country: United States
- State: Pennsylvania
- County: Crawford
- Township: Randolph

Area
  - Total: 0.15 sq mi (0.40 km^{2})
  - Land: 0.15 sq mi (0.40 km^{2})
  - Water: 0 sq mi (0.00 km^{2})
- Elevation: 1,380 ft (420 m)

Population (2020)
  - Total: 128
  - Density: 827.3/sq mi (319.42/km^{2})
- Time zone: UTC-4 (EST)
  - Summer (DST): UTC-5 (EDT)
- ZIP code: 16327
- Area code: 814
- FIPS code: 42-31840

Guys Mills is a census-designated place in Crawford County, Pennsylvania, United States. The population was 124 at the 2010 census.

== Geography ==
Guys Mills is located in northwestern Crawford County at 41°37′51″N 79°58′35″W (41.630787, -79.976325), west of the center of Randolph Township. Pennsylvania Route 198 passes through the town, leading northwest 6 miles (10 km) to Blooming Valley and southeast 4 miles (6 km) to Pennsylvania Route 27.

According to the United States Census Bureau, the CDP has a total area of 0.15 square miles (0.40 km^{2}), all land.

== Demographics ==
Historical population
Census	Pop.	Note	%±
2020	128		—
U.S. Decennial Census

As of the census of 2000, there were 133 people, 33 households, and 26 families residing in the CDP. The population density was 858.3 inhabitants per square mile (331.4/km^{2}). There were 34 housing units at an average density of 219.4 per square mile (84.7/km^{2}). The racial makeup of the CDP was 99.25% White and 0.75% Asian. Hispanic or Latino of any race were 2.26% of the population.

There were 33 households, out of which 39.4% had children under the age of 18 living with them, 60.6% were married couples living together, 15.2% had a female householder with no husband present, and 21.2% were non-families. 15.2% of all households were made up of individuals, and 3.0% had someone living alone who was 65 years of age or older. The average household size was 2.85 and the average family size was 3.23.

In the CDP, the population was spread out, with 22.6% under the age of 18, 17.3% from 18 to 24, 31.6% from 25 to 44, 14.3% from 45 to 64, and 14.3% who were 65 years of age or older. The median age was 32 years. For every 100 females, there were 77.3 males. For every 100 females age 18 and over, there were 60.9 males.

The median income for a household in the CDP was $33,125, and the median income for a family was $30,938. Males had a median income of $32,500 versus $21,250 for females. The per capita income for the CDP was $11,978. There were 6.5% of families and 10.9% of the population living below the poverty line, including 17.9% of under eighteens and 12.0% of those over 64.

== History ==
The John Brown Home, Tannery, & Museum is located in Guys Mills. It was a stop on the Underground Railroad.
