= Woodcock Township, Pennsylvania =

Township in Pennsylvania, US

Coordinates: 41°45′01″N 80°06′29″W

Woodcock Township, Crawford County, Pennsylvania
- Township
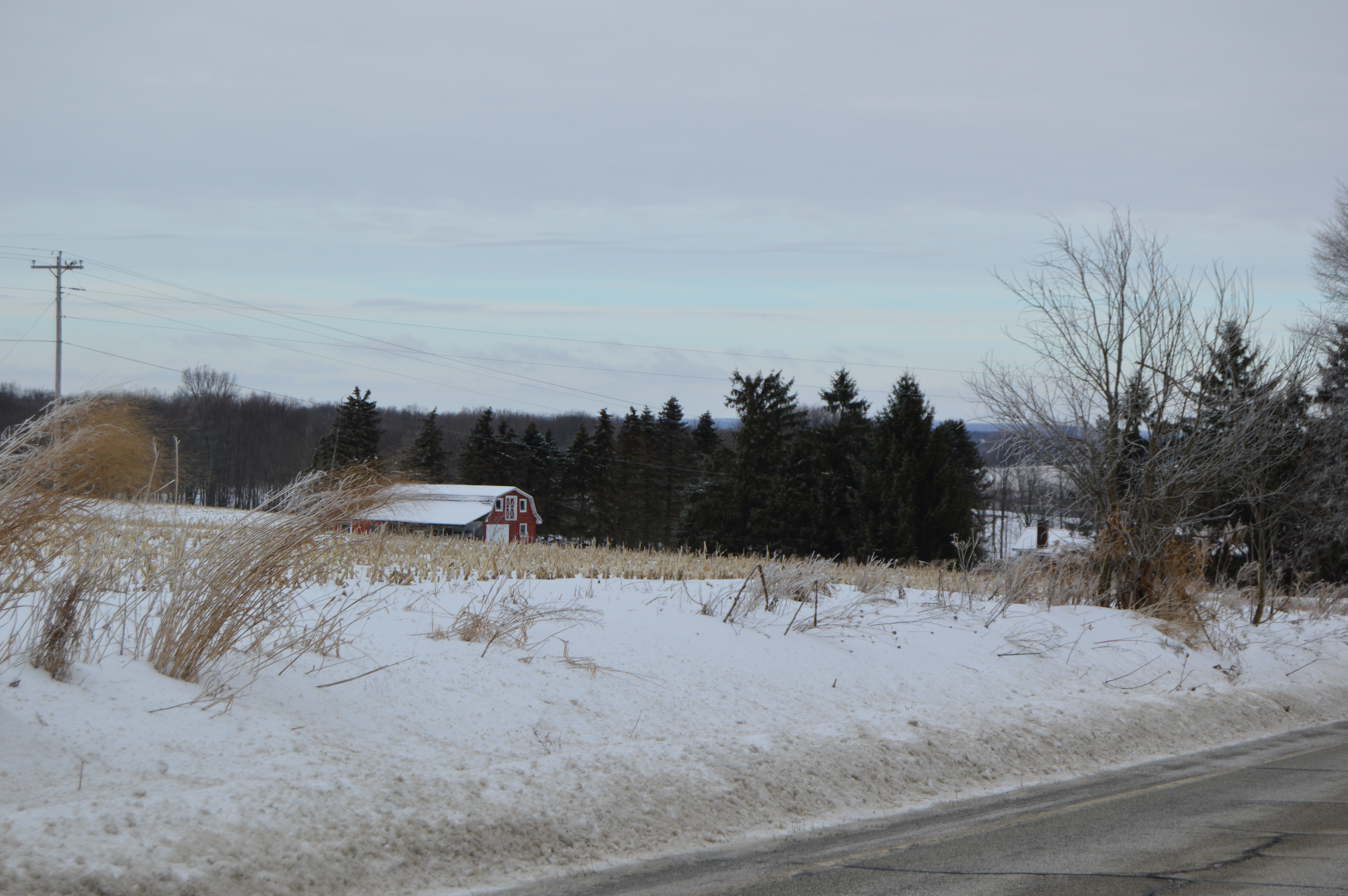
- Stubble field south of Woodcock

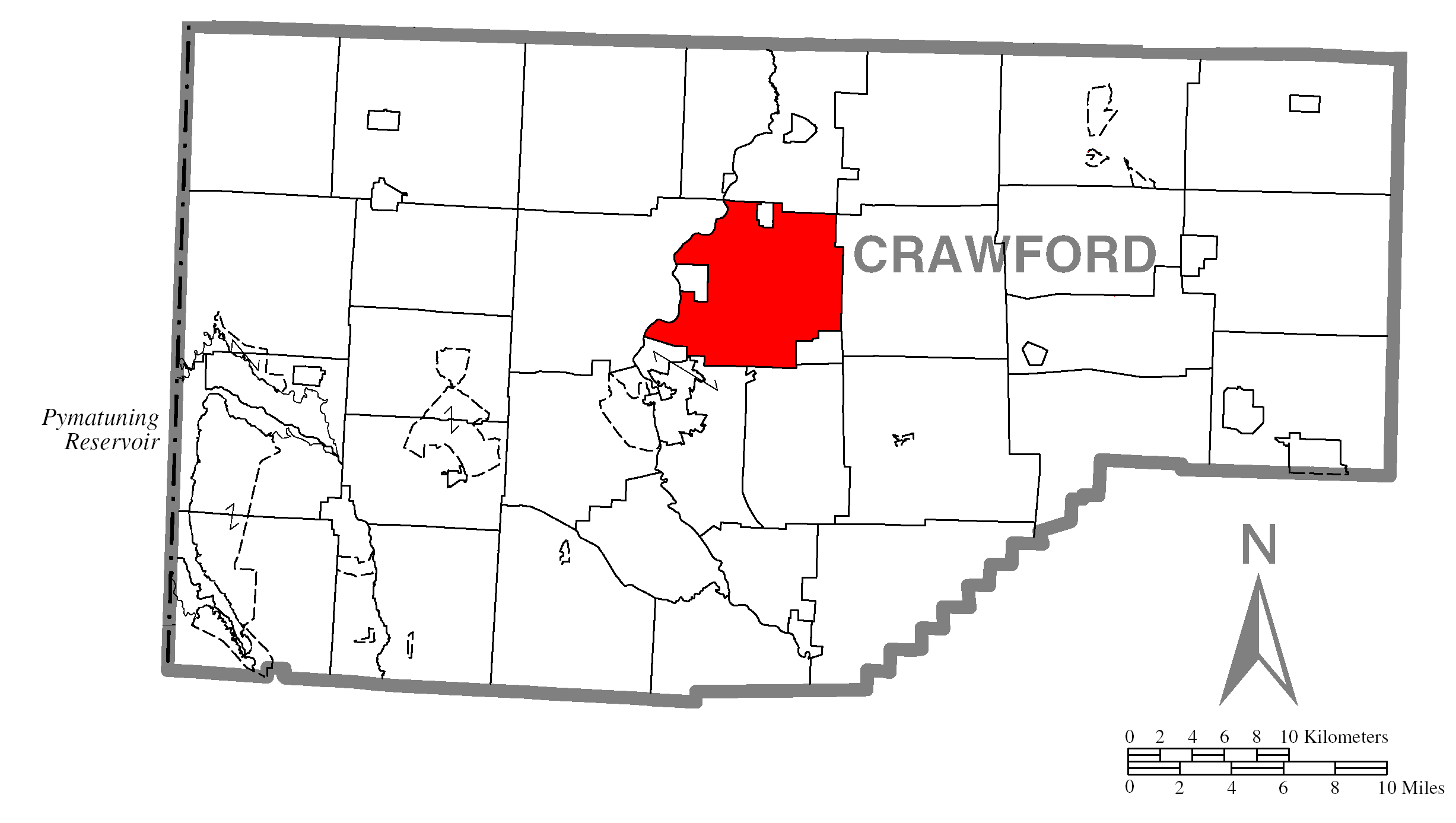
- Location of Woodcock Township in Crawford County

- Location of Crawford County in Pennsylvania
- Country: United States
- State: Pennsylvania
- County: Crawford County

Area
  - Total: 32.83 sq mi (85.04 km^{2})
  - Land: 32.30 sq mi (83.66 km^{2})
  - Water: 0.53 sq mi (1.38 km^{2})
- Highest elevation (northeast corner of township): 1,610 ft (490 m)
- Lowest elevation (French Creek): 1,090 ft (330 m)

Population (2020)
  - Total: 2,757 ▼
  - Estimate (2024): 2,727
  - Density: 86.0/sq mi (33.22/km^{2})
- Time zone: UTC-4 (EST)
  - Summer (DST): UTC-5 (EDT)
- Area code: 814
- FIPS code: 42-039-86168
- Website: www.woodcocktownship.com

Historical population
Census	Pop.	Note	%±
2000	2,976		—
2010	2,856		−4.0%
2020	2,757		−3.5%
2024 (est.)	2,727		−1.1%
U.S. Decennial Census

Woodcock Township is a township in Crawford County, Pennsylvania, United States. The population was 2,756 at the 2020 census, down from 2,856 at the 2010 census.

== Geography ==
Woodcock Township is located just north of the geographic center of Crawford County. The borough of Saegertown is along the western border, Woodcock is along the northern border, and Blooming Valley borders the southeastern corner of the township. All three boroughs are separate municipalities from the township. French Creek forms the western boundary of the township, except at Saegertown. Woodcock Creek, a tributary of French Creek, flows across the township from east to west, impounded as Woodcock Creek Lake near the township center. Woodcock Lake Park is along the southern side of the lake. Gravel Run, a tributary of French Creek, drains the northern part of the township.

According to the United States Census Bureau, the township has a total area of 32.9 square miles (85.3 km^{2}), of which 32.4 square miles (83.9 km^{2}) is land and 0.54 square miles (1.4 km^{2}), or 1.62%, is water.

== Demographics ==
As of the census of 2000, there were 2,976 people, 1,028 households, and 773 families residing in the township. The population density was 91.4 inhabitants per square mile (35.3/km^{2}). There were 1,107 housing units at an average density of 34.0 per square mile (13.1/km^{2}). The racial makeup of the township was 98.05% White, 1.01% African American, 0.24% Native American, 0.07% Asian, 0.10% from other races, and 0.54% from two or more races. Hispanic or Latino of any race were 0.20% of the population.

There were 1,028 households, out of which 29.1% had children under the age of 18 living with them, 55.5% were married couples living together, 18.5% had a female householder with no husband present, and 4.8% were non-families. 18.9% of all households were made up of individuals, and 6.7% had someone living alone who was 65 years of age or older. The average household size was 2.62 and the average family size was 3.01.

In the township the population was spread out, with 25.6% under the age of 18, 5.2% from 18 to 24, 26.6% from 25 to 44, 25.1% from 45 to 64, and 17.4% who were 65 years of age or older. The median age was 40 years. For every 100 females there were 97.0 males. For every 100 females age 18 and over, there were 95.0 males.

The median income for a household in the township was $31,023, and the median income for a family was $44,837. Males had a median income of $33,900 versus $23,977 for females. The per capita income for the township was $18,093. About 10.3% of families and 12.4% of the population were below the poverty line, including 19.3% of those under age 18 and 8.3% of those age 65 or over.
