= Saegertown, Pennsylvania =

Borough in Pennsylvania, US

- Borough
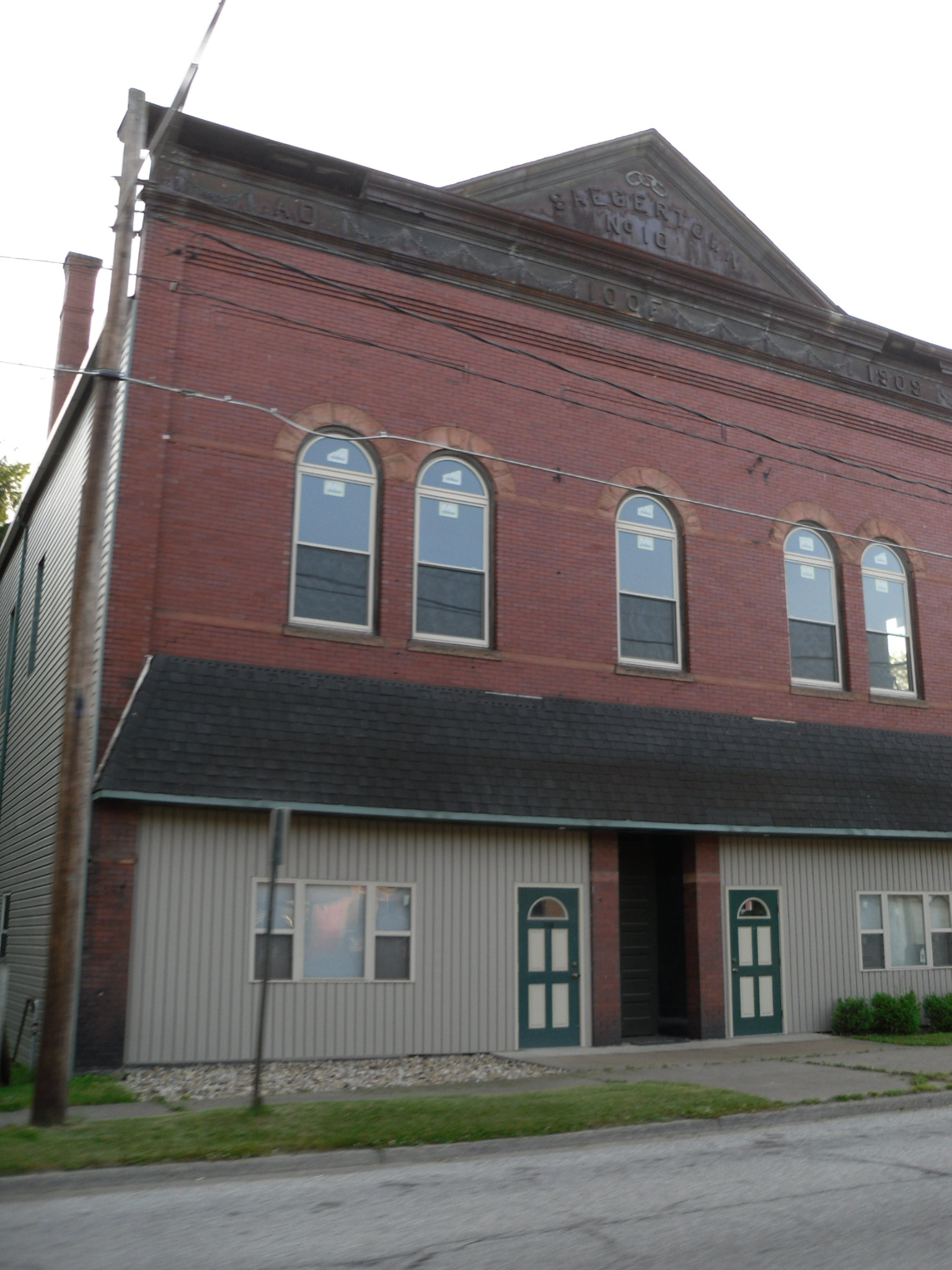
- A street in Saegertown

- Flag Logo

- Location of Saegertown in Crawford County, Pennsylvania (left) and of Crawford County in Pennsylvania

- Location of Saegertown in Pennsylvania
- Coordinates: 41°43′10″N 80°8′44″W
- Country: United States
- State: Pennsylvania
- County: Crawford
- Founded: 1824

Government
  - Mayor: Dave Myers

Area
  - Total: 1.44 sq mi (3.74 km^{2})
  - Land: 1.44 sq mi (3.74 km^{2})
  - Water: 0 sq mi (0.00 km^{2})
- Elevation (middle of borough): 1,115 ft (340 m)
- Highest elevation (east side of borough): 1,330 ft (410 m)
- Lowest elevation (French Creek): 1,100 ft (340 m)

Population (2020)
  - Total: 869
  - Density: 602.8/sq mi (232.73/km^{2})
- Time zone: UTC-4 (EST)
  - Summer (DST): UTC-5 (EDT)
- ZIP code: 16433
- Area code: 814
- FIPS code: 42-67120
- Website: www.saegertownpa.com

Saegertown is a borough in Crawford County, Pennsylvania. The population was 869 at the time of the 2020 census, down from 997 at the 2010 census. It was established in 1824. The Edward Saeger House was added to the National Register of Historic Places in 1980.

== History ==
"The settlement began at what is now known as Saegertown ca. 1795, when the brothers, Arthur and Patrick McGill, came to Woodcock Township. After Major Roger Alden built a sawmill in Saegertown, approximately 1800, the settlement was known for several years as Aldens Mill. In 1824, Daniel Saeger bought Alden's mill and adjacent lands and at the age of 44, he laid out the town under its present name. Saeger, a native of Pennsylvania of German descent, left Egypt, Pa. in 1823 to find a suitable place to settle. After he arrived in Saegertown, he attracted to the area a large number of German Yeomanry from Lehigh and other eastern Pa. counties. Being active in the community, Saeger was an early member of the Lutheran Church, the owner of a sawmill and general store, and a justice of the peace. He was a member of the Pa. State Legislature."

The Edward Saeger House was added to the National Register of Historic Places in 1980.

== Geography ==
Saegertown is located north of the center of Crawford County at 41°43′10″N 80°8′44″W (41.719482, -80.145660). It is bordered to the north, east, and south by Woodcock Township and to the west, across French Creek, by Hayfield Township.

U.S. routes 19 and 6 pass together through the center of town, leading northeast 8 miles (13 km) to Cambridge Springs and south 6 miles (10 km) to Meadville, the Crawford County seat. Pennsylvania Route 198 leads southeast 6 miles (10 km) to Blooming Valley and west 3 miles (5 km) to Exit 154 on Interstate 79. Via I-79, it is 32 miles (51 km) north to Erie and 95 miles (153 km) south to Pittsburgh.

According to the United States Census Bureau, the borough has a total area of 1.5 square miles (4.0 km^{2}), all land.

== Demographics ==
Historical population
Census	Pop.	Note	%±
1860	352		—
1870	441		25.3%
1880	678		53.7%
1890	745		9.9%
1900	607		−18.5%
1910	712		17.3%
1920	659		−7.4%
1930	645		−2.1%
1940	753		16.7%
1950	836		11.0%
1960	1,131		35.3%
1970	1,348		19.2%
1980	942		−30.1%
1990	1,066		13.2%
2000	1,071		0.5%
2010	997		−6.9%
2020	871		−12.6%
2022 (est.)	859	▼	−1.4%
U.S. Decennial Census

As of the census of 2000, there were 1,071 people, 361 households, and 251 families residing in the borough. The population density was 743.5 inhabitants per square mile (287.1/km^{2}). There were 378 housing units at an average density of 262.4 per square mile (101.3/km^{2}). The racial makeup of the borough was 95.05% White, 2.52% African American, 0.37% Native American, 0.19% Asian, 0.65% from other races, and 1.21% from two or more races. Hispanic or Latino of any race were 0.65% of the population.

There were 361 households, out of which 32.7% had children under the age of 18 living with them, 56.0% were married couples living together, 10.5% had a female householder with no husband present, and 30.2% were non-families. 25.5% of all households were made up of individuals, and 13.0% had someone living alone who was 65 years of age or older. The average household size was 2.45 and the average family size was 2.94.

In the borough the population was spread out, with 20.5% under the age of 18, 11.3% from 18 to 24, 33.3% from 25 to 44, 20.7% from 45 to 64, and 14.1% who were 65 years of age or older. The median age was 36 years. For every 100 females there were 122.7 males. For every 100 females age 18 and over, there were 125.1 males.

The median income for a household in the borough was $32,500, and the median income for a family was $39,688. Males had a median income of $28,281 versus $22,500 for females. The per capita income for the borough was $16,163. About 4.0% of families and 5.7% of the population were below the poverty line, including 6.4% of those under age 18 and none of those age 65 or over.

== Notable people ==
- Doug McKalip, chief agricultural negotiator
- Andrew Ryan McGill, 10th governor of Minnesota
- Sharon Stone, actress
- Melanie Tem, horror and fantasy author
- Spencer Lee, Olympic wrestler
