= Conneaut Creek =

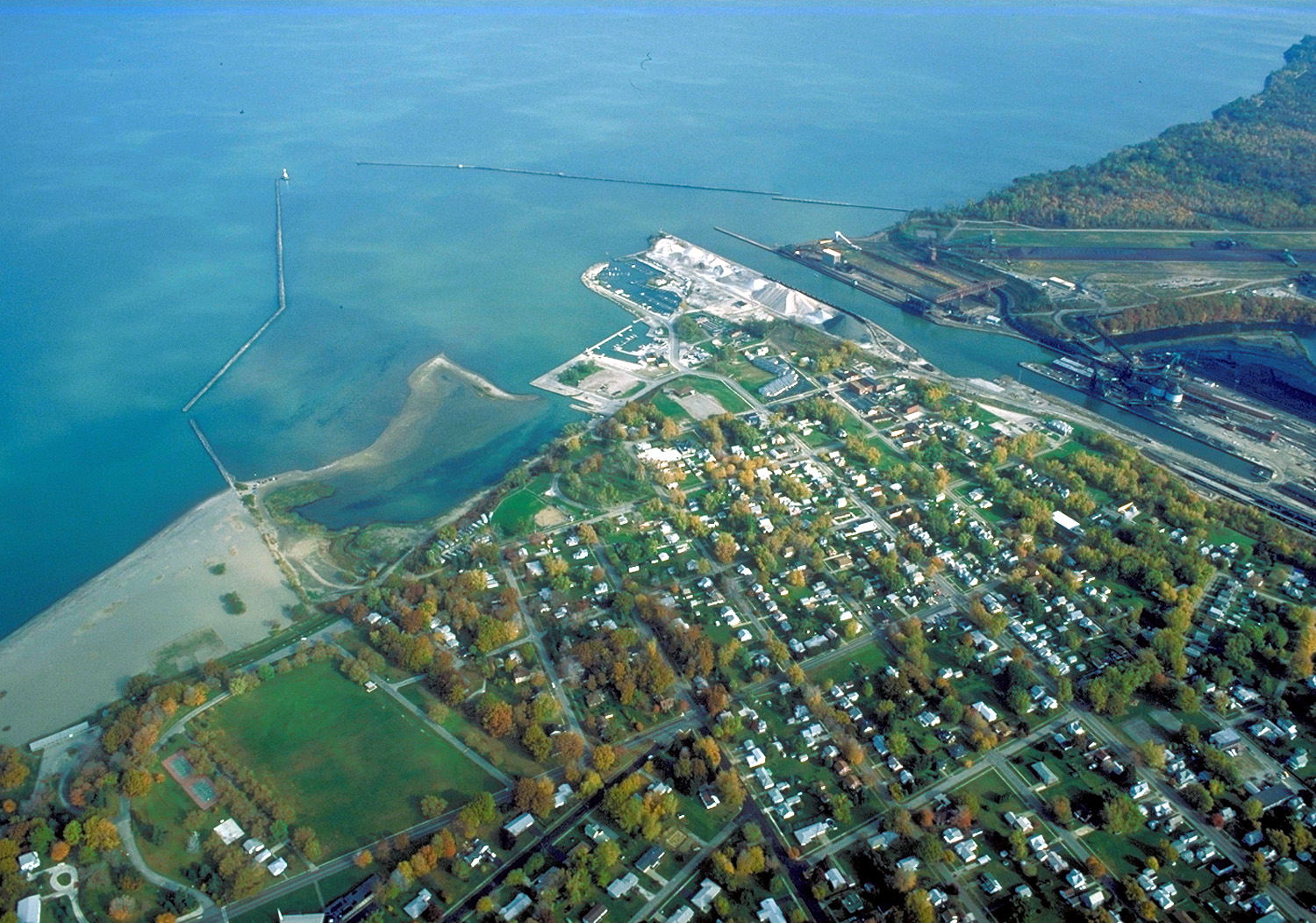
- Mouth of Conneaut Creek on Lake Erie at Conneaut, Ohio

- Location of the mouth of Conneaut Creek in Ohio Conneaut Creek (Ohio) Conneaut Creek (Pennsylvania)

Location
- Country: United States
- State: Ohio, Pennsylvania
- Counties: Ashtabula, Erie, Crawford

Physical characteristics
- Source
  - location: Linesville, Crawford County, Pennsylvania
  - coordinates: 41°40′41″N 80°23′19″W
  - elevation: 1,273 ft (388 m)
- Mouth: Lake Erie
  - location: Conneaut, Ohio
  - coordinates: 41°58′11″N 80°32′53″W
  - elevation: 768 ft (234 m)
- Length: 43.5 mi (70.0 km)
- Basin size: 152 sq mi (390 km^{2})
- Discharge
  - location: mouth
  - average: 323.46 cu ft/s (9.159 m^{3}/s) (estimate)

Basin features
- Tributaries
  - left: West Branch Conneaut Creek
  - right: East Branch Conneaut Creek

Conneaut Creek (/ˈkɑːni.ɔːt/ KAHN-ee-awt) is a 43.5-mile (70.0 km) tributary of Lake Erie flowing from northwestern Pennsylvania through northeastern Ohio in the United States. Via Lake Erie, the Niagara River and Lake Ontario, the creek is part of the watershed of the St. Lawrence River, which flows to the Atlantic Ocean.

Conneaut Creek rises in western Crawford County, Pennsylvania, and initially flows north-northwestwardly past Conneautville into western Erie County. Near Albion, it turns to the west-southwest and roughly parallels the shoreline of Lake Erie for some length, at a distance of about 5 mi (8 km) inland, into northeastern Ashtabula County, Ohio, where, at Kingsville, it turns to the northeast to flow into Lake Erie at the city of Conneaut.

== Variant names and spellings ==
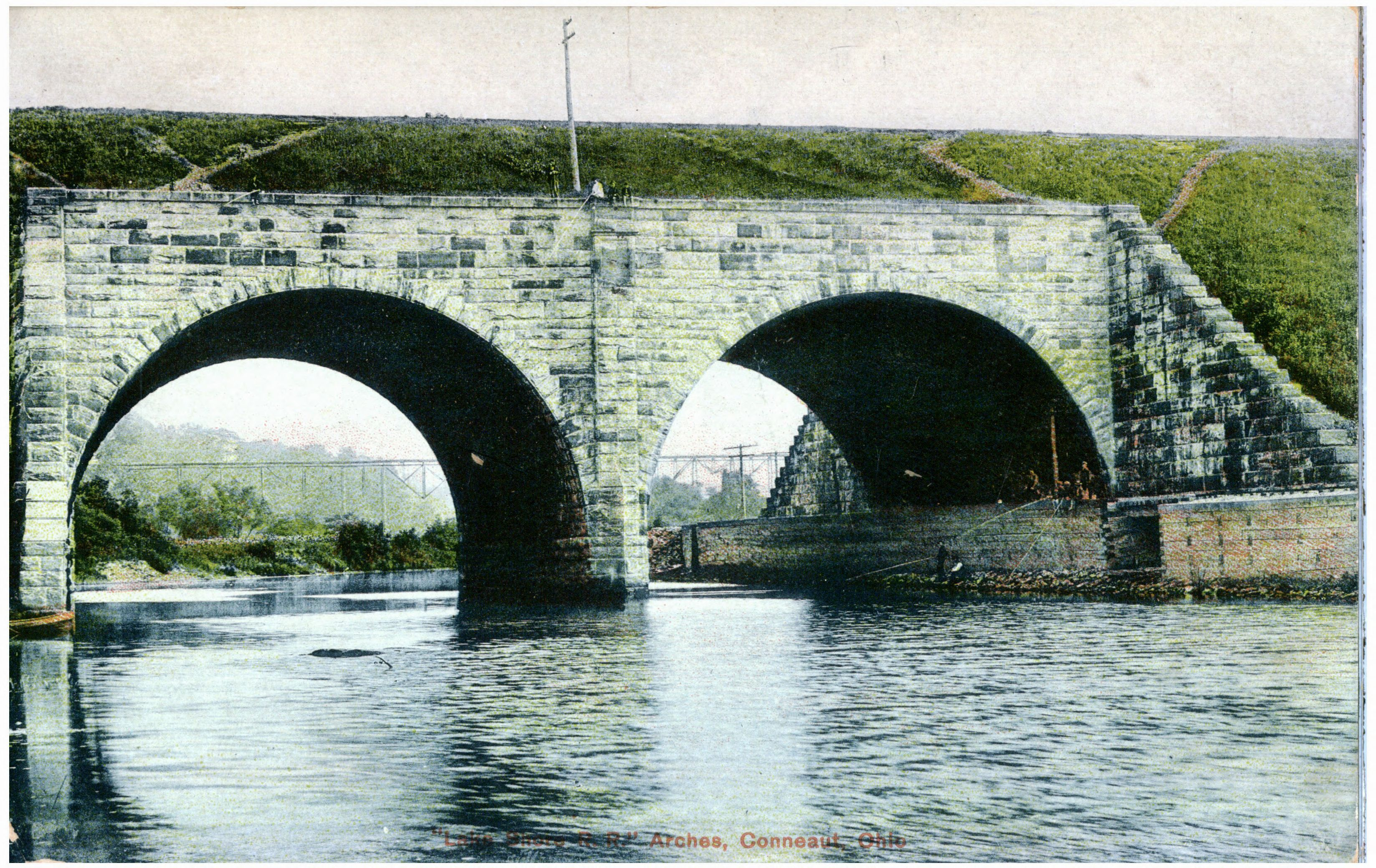
View of a railroad bridge across the Conneaut Creek in a 1910 postcard.

According to the Geographic Names Information System, Conneaut Creek has also been known historically as:

- Caneaught Creek
- Conneaut River
- Coneaught Creek
- Conneaugh River
- Conneought Creek
- Conyeayout Creek
- Counite Riviere

== See also ==
- List of rivers of Ohio
- List of rivers of Pennsylvania
