= Venango Township, Crawford County, Pennsylvania =

Township in Pennsylvania, US

Coordinates: 41.812°N 80.163°W

- Township
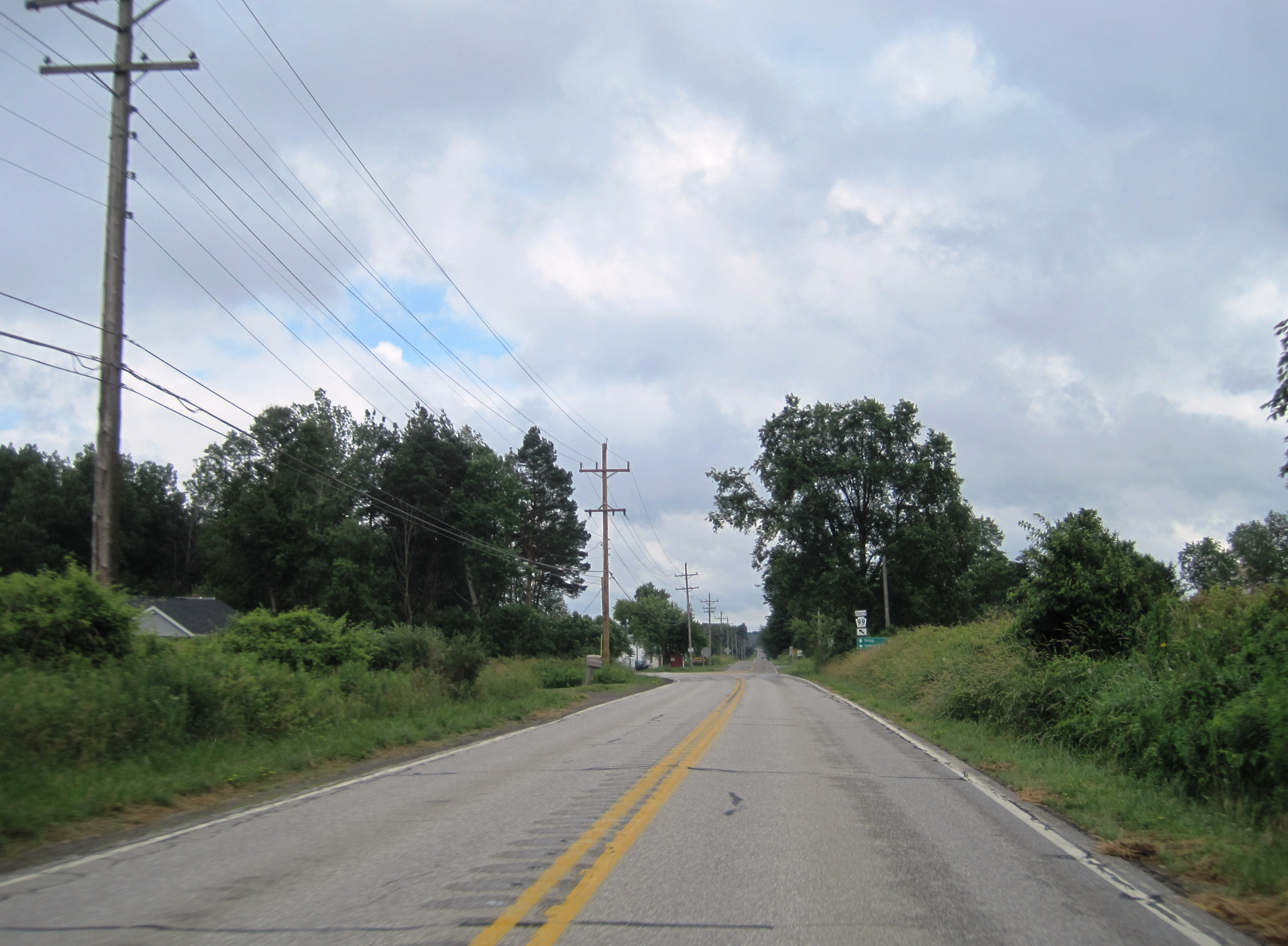
- PA 99 southbound in Venango Township

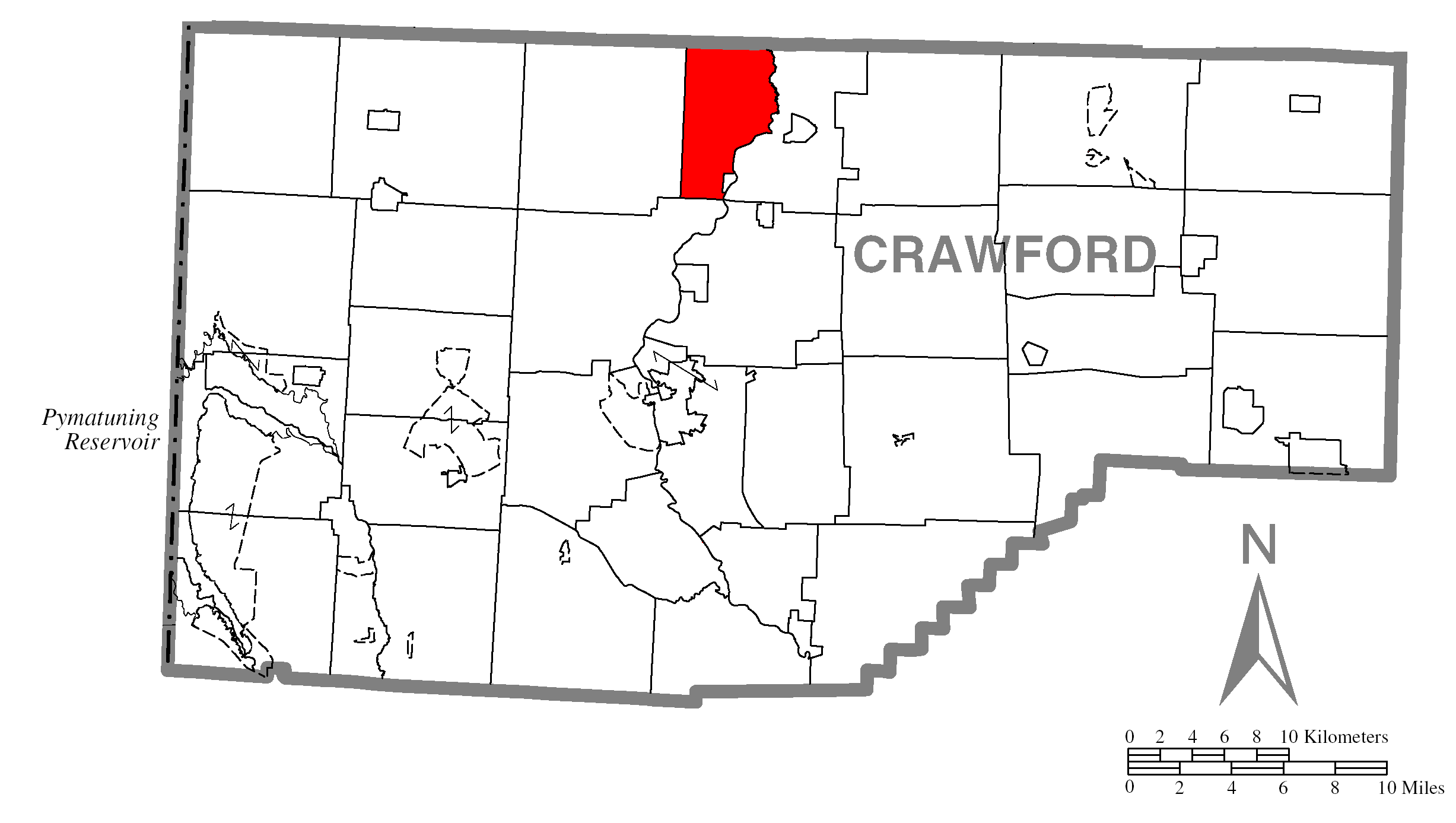
- Location of Venango Township in Crawford County

- Location of Crawford County in Pennsylvania
- Country: United States
- State: Pennsylvania
- County: Crawford County

Area
  - Total: 16.91 sq mi (43.80 km^{2})
  - Land: 16.88 sq mi (43.71 km^{2})
  - Water: 0.035 sq mi (0.09 km^{2})
- Highest elevation (west of Venango Borough): 1,500 ft (460 m)
- Lowest elevation (French Creek): 1,120 ft (340 m)

Population (2020)
  - Total: 939 ▼
  - Estimate (2024): 930
  - Density: 58.1/sq mi (22.44/km^{2})
- Time zone: UTC-4 (EST)
  - Summer (DST): UTC-5 (EDT)
- Area code: 814
- FIPS code: 42-039-79920
- Website: https://venangotwpcrawfordcounty.gov/

Venango Township is a township in Crawford County, Pennsylvania, United States. The population was 939 at the 2020 census, down from 997 at the 2010 census.

== Geography ==
Venango Township is located in north-central Crawford County and is bordered by Erie County to the north. The borough of Venango, a separate municipality, borders the township near its southeast corner. The eastern border of the township, with the exception of the border with Venango borough, is formed by Conneauttee Creek in the north, then French Creek.

According to the United States Census Bureau, the township has a total area of 16.9 square miles (43.8 km^{2}), of which 16.9 square miles (43.7 km^{2}) is land and 0.04 square miles (0.1 km^{2}), or 0.20%, is water.

== Demographics ==
Historical population
Census	Pop.	Note	%±
2000	956		—
2010	997		4.3%
2020	939		−5.8%
2024 (est.)	930		−1.0%
U.S. Decennial Census

As of the census of 2000, there were 956 people, 340 households, and 247 families residing in the township. The population density was 56.6 inhabitants per square mile (21.9/km^{2}). There were 407 housing units at an average density of 24.1/sq mi (9.3/km^{2}). The racial makeup of the township was 96.86% White, 1.46% African American, 0.10% Native American, 0.10% Asian, 0.52% Pacific Islander, 0.10% from other races, and 0.84% from two or more races. Hispanic or Latino of any race were 0.52% of the population.

There were 340 households, out of which 36.5% had children under the age of 18 living with them, 60.9% were married couples living together, 6.8% had a female householder with no husband present, and 27.1% were non-families. 21.8% of all households were made up of individuals, and 7.9% had someone living alone who was 65 years of age or older. The average household size was 2.67 and the average family size was 3.15.

In the township the population was spread out, with 29.5% under the age of 18, 8.5% from 18 to 24, 27.3% from 25 to 44, 24.6% from 45 to 64, and 10.1% who were 65 years of age or older. The median age was 35 years. For every 100 females, there were 102.5 males. For every 100 females age 18 and over, there were 100.0 males.

The median income for a household in the township was $42,679, and the median income for a family was $46,250. Males had a median income of $33,929 versus $21,442 for females. The per capita income for the township was $17,891. About 9.2% of families and 14.2% of the population were below the poverty line, including 14.5% of those under age 18 and 15.6% of those age 65 or over.
