= Pymatuning =

Pymatuning can refer to several places in the U.S. States of Ohio and Pennsylvania:

== Ohio ==
=== Ashtabula County ===
- Pymatuning State Park (Ohio)
- Pymatuning Valley High School

== Pennsylvania ==
=== Crawford County ===
- Pymatuning Central, Pennsylvania, a census-designated place
- Pymatuning North, Pennsylvania, a census-designated place
- Pymatuning South, Pennsylvania, a census-designated place
- Pymatuning State Park (Pennsylvania)
- Pymatuning Laboratory of Ecology, the ecology field station of the University of Pittsburgh

=== Mercer County ===
- Pymatuning Township, Pennsylvania
- South Pymatuning Township, Pennsylvania

== Ohio and Pennsylvania ==
- Pymatuning Reservoir, a man-made lake
- Pymatuning Creek, a tributary of the Shenango River
