= Shenango Township, Pennsylvania =

Shenango Township can refer to these places in the U.S. state of Pennsylvania:

- Shenango Township, Lawrence County, Pennsylvania
- Shenango Township, Mercer County, Pennsylvania

== See also ==
- North Shenango Township, Pennsylvania
- South Shenango Township, Pennsylvania
- West Shenango Township, Pennsylvania
