= Jamestown Area School District =

School district in Pennsylvania

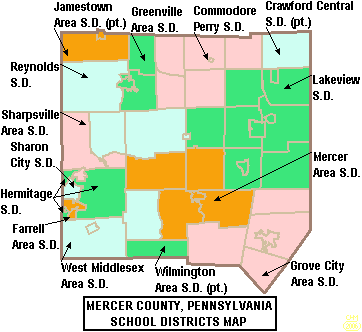

Address
- 204 Shenango Street Jamestown, Mercer County, Pennsylvania, 16134-0217; United States

District information
- Type: Public

Students and staff
- District mascot: Mighty Muskies

Other information
- Website: www.jasdmuskies.com

The Jamestown Area School District is a small, rural, public school district serving parts of Mercer County, Pennsylvania and Crawford County, Pennsylvania. It encompasses 61 square miles (160 km^{2}) including the communities of Jamestown and Greene Township in Mercer County, and the municipalities of West Shenango Township and South Shenango Township in Crawford County.

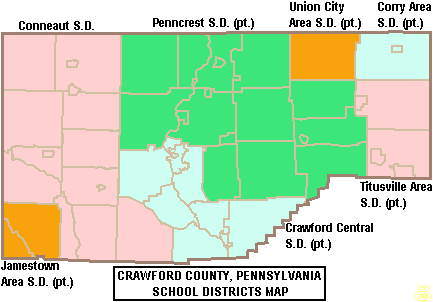
Jamestown Area School District region in Crawford County

== History ==
The enrollment, in 2011 was 580 pupils. This enrollment is among the 10% lowest in districts within the Commonwealth. According to 2000 federal census data, it serves a resident population of 4,377. By 2010, the district's population declined to 4,245 people.

In 2009, the Jamestown Area School District residents' per capita income was $16,562, while the median family income was $40,690.

The Jamestown Area School District operates Jamestown Area Elementary School and Jamestown Area Junior Senior High School.

== Extracurriculars ==
The Jamestown Area School District offers an extensive program including clubs, activities and a sports program.

=== Sports ===
The District funds:

Boys

- Baseball – A
- Basketball- A
- Cross Country – A
- Golf – A
- Wrestling – AA

Girls

- Basketball – A
- Cross Country – A
- Gymnastics – AAAA
- Softball – AA
- Volleyball – A

Junior High School Sports

Boys

- Basketball
- Cross Country
- Wrestling

Girls

- Basketball
- Cross Country
- Volleyball

According to PIAA directory July 2013
