= Pymatuning State Park =

Pymatuning State Park can refer to either of two adjoining state parks in the United States:

- Pymatuning State Park (Ohio)
- Pymatuning State Park (Pennsylvania)
