= Espyville, Pennsylvania =

Unincorporated community in Pennsylvania, US

- Unincorporated community
- Location within Pennsylvania Location within the United States
- Coordinates: 41°36′23″N 80°29′39″W
- Country: United States
- State: Pennsylvania
- County: Crawford
- Elevation: 1,040 ft (320 m)
- Time zone: UTC-5 (Eastern (EST))
  - Summer (DST): UTC-4 (EDT)
- Area code: 814
- GNIS feature ID: 1174324

Espyville is an unincorporated community in North Shenango Township, Crawford County, Pennsylvania, United States. Espyville is part of the Pymatuning Central census-designated place.
