= Pymatuning Laboratory of Ecology =

Ecology field station in Pennsylvania, U.S.

Coordinates: 41.6427°N 80.4277°W

The Pymatuning Laboratory of Ecology (PLE) is a year-round ecology field station of the University of Pittsburgh Department of Biological Sciences located in Linesville and South Shenango Township on the shores of Pymatuning Lake in Pennsylvania. The station contains research facilities and equipment, conducts undergraduate education and courses, and serves as center for conferences, symposia, and retreats. The Pyatuning Laboratory hosts researchers from the University of Pittsburgh as well as those from universities throughout the nation and world, which have included, among others, researchers form Duke University, the University of Virginia, the University of Georgia, the University of Miami. Likewise, course instructors at the lab come from the University of Pittsburgh, but also have included instructors from other institutions including Georgia Tech, the University of Connecticut, and the National Aviary. In addition, the University of Pittsburgh has instituted a collaborative program for study at the Pymatuning Lab with other area universities in which students that are enrolled through any of these institutions register, pay tuition, and receive credit at their home institutions. Schools participating in the collaborative program include Clarion University, Edinboro University, Indiana University of Pennsylvania, and Slippery Rock University.

== History ==
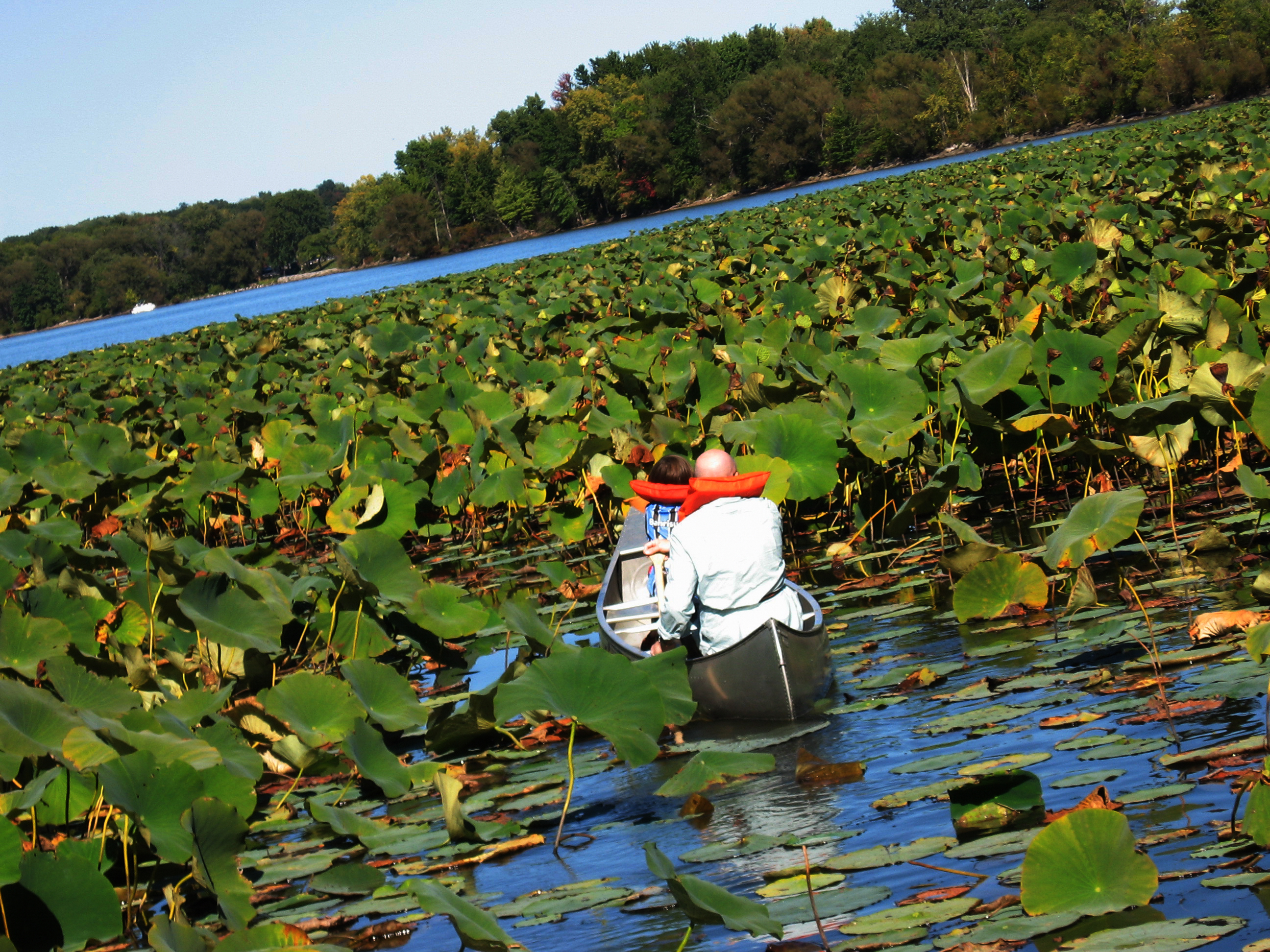
Canoeing near the lab

The University of Pittsburgh established a biological field station at Presque Isle, Pennsylvania on the shores of Lake Erie in 1926. However, the creation of Presque Isle State Park crowded out the modest field station, and in 1949 the field station moved to Pymatuning State Park. The University of Pittsburgh obtained a lease from the state for a 13-acre (5.3 ha) wooded peninsula adjacent to the Pennsylvania State Fish Hatchery which became known as the Sanctuary Lake Site. The first building was constructed on this site in 1952. Over time more research buildings were erected on the site in order to satisfy the educational and research needs of the University of Pittsburgh and visiting faculty and students from other colleges and universities in Western Pennsylvania.

By 1965, the university had outgrown the Sanctuary Lake Site facilities and it obtained a second lease from the Pymatuning State Park for a dedicated housing site. As the Housing Site expanded and developed, the Sanctuary Lake Site was dedicated to maintaining modern research and teaching facilities. Today, this site has modern facilities for housing instructors, researchers, and students as well as a Dining Hall, Kitchen, and Recreation Hall.

Major renovations and building projects were undertaken in the mid-1990s that resulted in a 30% increase in space and included the installation of numerous pieces of equipment and lab renovations. Among the projects was a new $81,000 (Note: equivalent to $158,659 in 2024) 1,700 square feet (160 m^{2}) administration building with a library and a $102,000 (Note: equivalent to $199,792 in 2024) faculty housing unit that was completed in 1997. Since 2000, the University of Pittsburgh has renovated and expanded the facilities, as well as adding a significant increase in land. This has included the acquisition of three research properties, Wallace Woods, Beagle Road, and the Livingston Farm, that total 360 acres (150 ha). In addition, the university has constructed five additional labs. In addition, the lab has been awarded a grant from the National Science Foundation to construct a new $1.2 million, 3,600-square-foot (330 m^{2}) laboratory building to be completed in 2014 that will contain three new research labs including new animal care space for bird researches and sterile lab space for molecular and microbial biology. This facility will also be open to K-12 public school students when the universities are on hiatus.

== Facilities ==
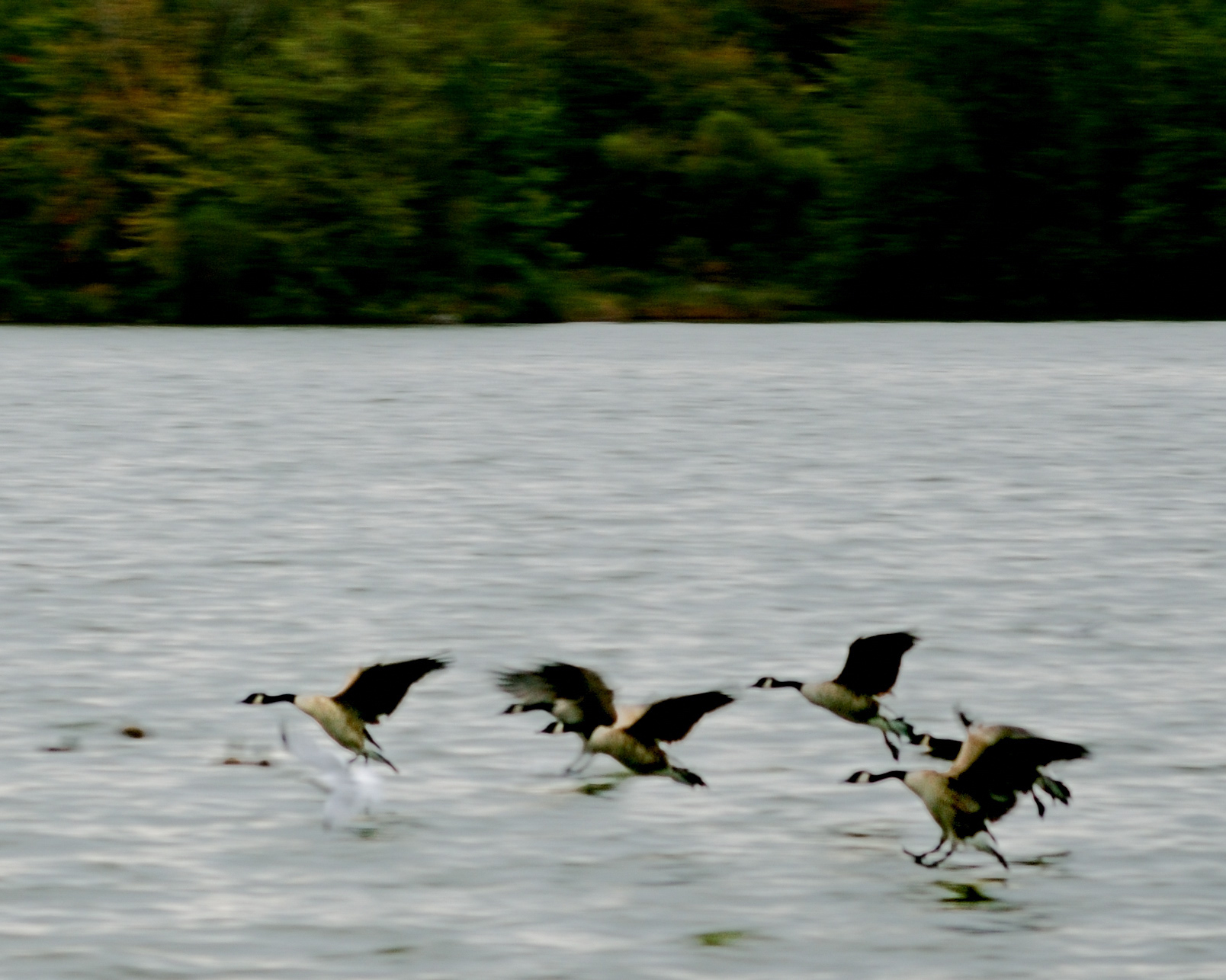

The lab and teaching facilities of the Pymatuning Laboratory are located within public lands consisting of an 11,000-acre (4,500 ha) Wildlife Sanctuary and Propagation area owned by the Commonwealth of Pennsylvania. In addition, the Pymatuning Laboratory owns 360 acres (150 ha) of research sites that includes tracts of forest, successional field, and wetland along Linesville Creek in the Pymatuning watershed, and another tract of successional meadow, designated for experimental plantings and manipulations, a few miles from the laboratory site. An old-growth forest preserve of the Western Pennsylvania Conservancy also is managed by the Lab. Facilities include 10 research labs, cabins, dormitories, a dining hall, and lecture rooms. The lab is also stocked with a variety of equipment for research as well as recreational purposes.

=== Sanctuary Lake Site ===
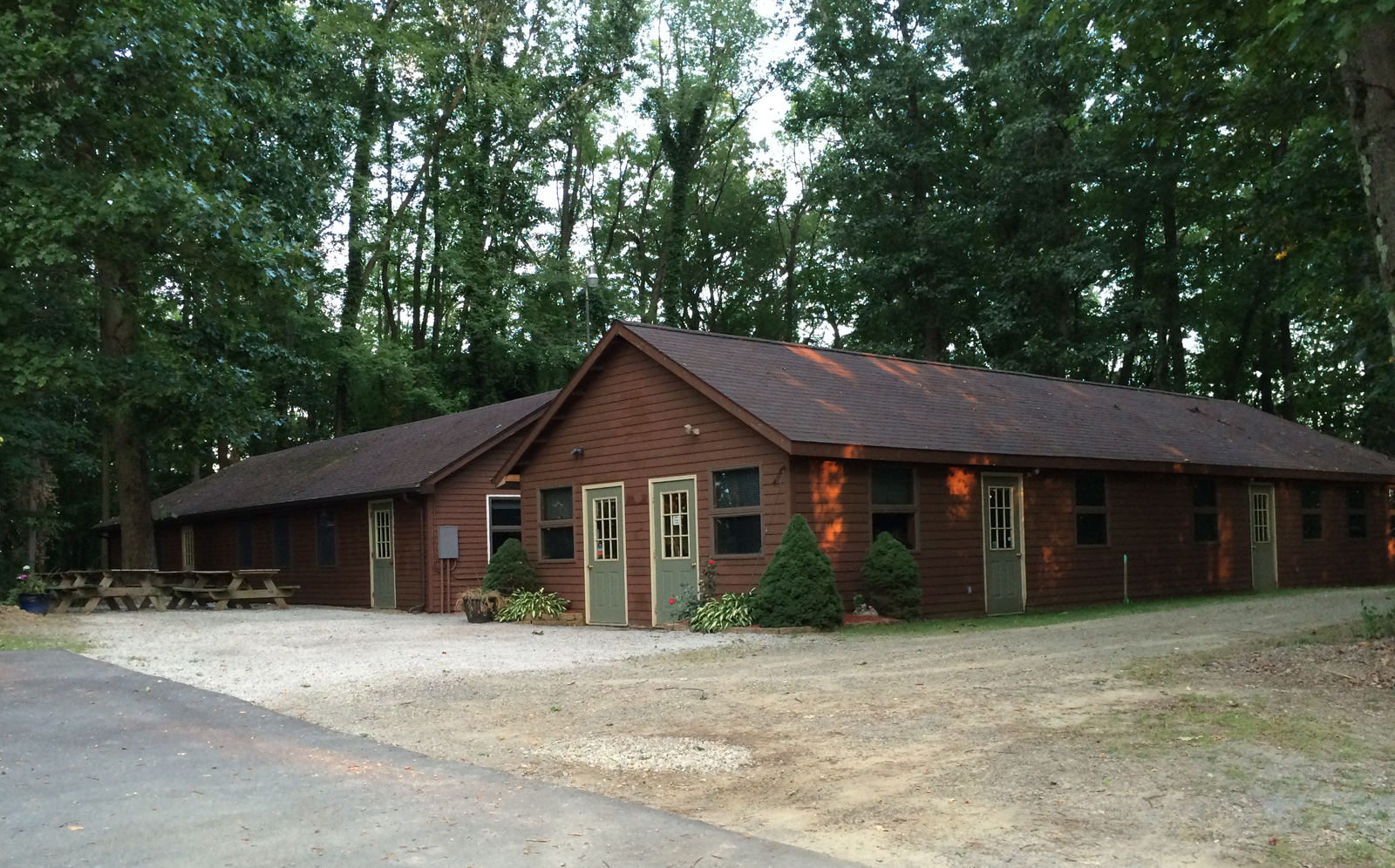
Lab buildings at the Sanctuary Lake Site

The Sanctuary Lake Site is the original research site for the Pymatuning Laboratory of Ecology since 1949 and is situated on Sanctuary Lake, a protected waterway, which several of the original classrooms overlook. This 13-acre (5.3 ha) site contains eight research laboratories, a stockroom, environmental chambers, a −40 °C (−40 °F) freezer, wireless internet, a computer lab, and 24-hour emergency power back-up. There is also a library and a large lecture hall that can accommodate more than 100 people.

=== Donald S. Wood Field Lab ===
The Donald S. Wood Field Lab, previously known as the Livingston Road Laboratory and affectionately called "the farm", is the newest facility at PLE and contains 134 acres (54 ha) of field and forest, offering a variety of venues for observation or experimentation. In addition, there is a 3,000-square-foot (280 m^{2}) building containing aquatic and terrestrial research laboratories, a large garage for storage, two water wells, temperature controlled rooms, offices, restrooms, internet access, and a modern security system.

=== Beagle Road Site ===
The Beagle Road Site is a 23-acre (9.3 ha) site that supports an old-field community and is currently the location for a variety of old-field and aquatic mesocosm experiments.

=== Wallace Woods ===
Wallace Woods is a 26-acre (11 ha) site that contains a fairly mature second-growth forest. It also includes a stretch of Linesville Creek for aquatic study. The vegetation of this site has been particularly well studied over the years, allowing providing significant potential for future research projects.

=== Tryon-Weber Woods ===
Tryon-Weber Woods is an 84-acre (34 ha) site of forested land that is stewarded by Pymatuning Lab and owned by the Western Pennsylvania Nature Conservancy. It contains a mature American beech-sugar maple woods and is considered to be one of the finest examples of such an old-growth forest in northwestern Pennsylvania.

=== Janette Rose Tryon Reserve ===
The Janette Rose Tryon Reserve contains 80 acres (32 ha) of forested land that was selectively logged in recent decades. The land contains second-growth timber and a substantial number of wetlands located within the forest mosaic.

=== Residences ===
Various on-site and off-site residences exist at the Pymatuning Lab to house up to 120 students and researchers.

==== Housing Site ====
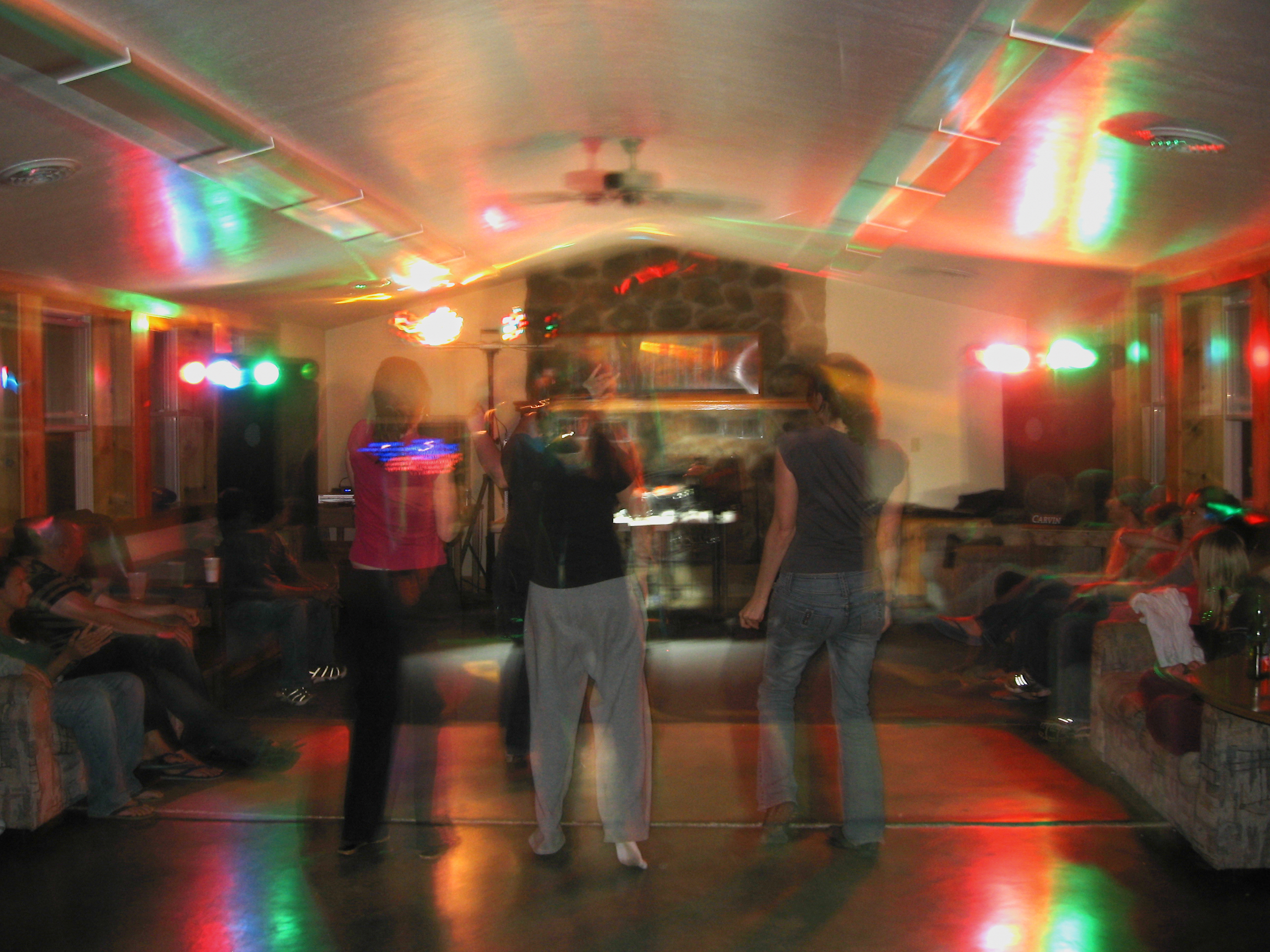
Inside Recreation Hall at the Housing Site

The Housing Site, located on the shores of Pymatuning Lake, contains most of the residential opportunities for students and researchers. The site is composed of ten residence structures and also includes on-site equipped kitchens, a laundry facility, dining hall, and Recreational Hall that features a fireplace, satellite television, pool table, foosball table, and ping-pong table. The entire lake-shore housing site is served by high-speed, wireless internet. The Housing Site also maintains a supply of recreation equipment including canoes, kayaks, a volleyball court, and a horseshoe pit, and is nearby are beaches for swimming and trails for hiking, biking, bird watching, and running.

Undergraduate and graduate student housing is provided in three dormitories: the Mountain Laurel Men's Dorm, White-tailed Deer Women's Dorm, and the Bald Eagle Dorm. The dorms consist of a large room with 4 single beds and attached bath. A lounge area in each dorm serves as a social center and contains desktop computers that are connected to the internet. Residents take meals in the Dining Hall or use a communal kitchen in the Pavilion.

Researchers can obtain housing in the two-story Ruffled Grouse Apartments or in one of six cabins. The apartments consist of 2 bedrooms that share bath and a kitchen which is equipped with microwaves, stoves, refrigerators, dishes, utensils and cookware. Each bedroom has a private entrance and has either one double bed or 2 single beds and, if available, can be rented as a unit to provide family housing. The cabins which each have a living room, equipped kitchen, bath and 1, 2, or 3 bedrooms. Cabin bedrooms may contain either one double or two single beds. If space is available, 2 and 3 bedroom cabins may be rented to provide family housing.

==== Off-site housing ====
The Hartman House is located about a mile north of Linesville. It is a two-story house with living room, kitchen, bath, one large bedroom and three small bedrooms. The Hartman House also may be rented to provide housing for a family. Another off-site housing location exists at the Sanctuary Lake Site in the former director's house, also called the Hatchery House, which is a two-story, three-bedroom facility with a living room, kitchen and bathroom that can also provide family housing.
