= Pymatuning South, Pennsylvania =

Unincorporated community in Pennsylvania, US

Pymatuning South
- Census-designated place
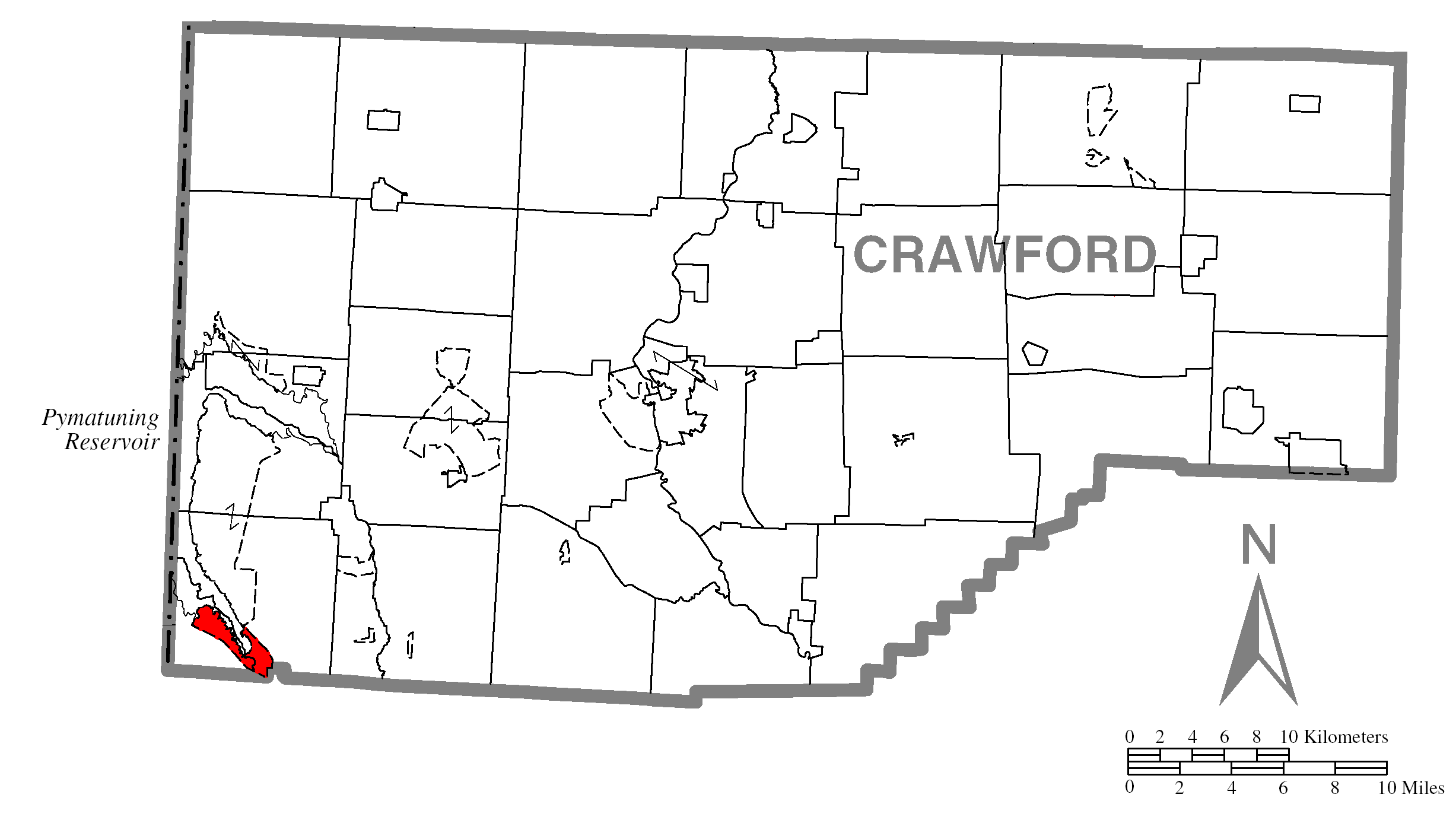
- Location of Pymatuning South in Crawford County

- Location of Crawford County in Pennsylvania
- Coordinates: 41°30′35″N 80°27′32″W
- Country: United States
- State: Pennsylvania
- County: Crawford County
- Townships: South Shenango, West Shenango

Area
  - Total: 2.60 sq mi (6.74 km^{2})
  - Land: 2.59 sq mi (6.71 km^{2})
  - Water: 0.012 sq mi (0.03 km^{2})

Population (2020)
  - Total: 392
  - Density: 151.4/sq mi (58.46/km^{2})
- Time zone: UTC-4 (EST)
  - Summer (DST): UTC-5 (EDT)
- Area code: 814
- FIPS code: 42-63013

Pymatuning South is a census-designated place (CDP) in Crawford County, Pennsylvania, United States. The population was 479 at the 2010 census.

== Geography ==
Pymatuning South is located near the southwest corner of Crawford County at 41°30′35″N 80°27′32″W (41.509668, -80.458999), at the southern end of Pymatuning Reservoir, one of the largest reservoirs in Pennsylvania. The CDP occupies both sides of the lake and extends southeast along the lake's outlet, the Shenango River, as far as the borough of Jamestown. On the northeastern side of the lake and the river, the CDP is in South Shenango Township; on the southwest side it is in West Shenango Township.

According to the United States Census Bureau, the CDP has a total area of 2.60 square miles (6.74 km^{2}), of which 2.59 square miles (6.71 km^{2}) is land and 0.01 square miles (0.03 km^{2}), or 0.44%, is water.

== Demographics ==
Historical population
Census	Pop.	Note	%±
2020	392		—
U.S. Decennial Census

As of the census of 2000, there were 467 people, 199 households, and 131 families residing in the CDP. The population density was 183.1 inhabitants per square mile (70.7/km^{2}). There were 342 housing units at an average density of 134.1 per square mile (51.8/km^{2}). The racial makeup of the CDP was 98.93% White, 0.64% Native American, 0.21% Asian, and 0.21% from two or more races.

There were 199 households, out of which 32.7% had children under the age of 18 living with them, 55.8% were married couples living together, 6.5% had a female householder with no husband present, and 33.7% were non-families. 29.1% of all households were made up of individuals, and 12.6% had someone living alone who was 65 years of age or older. The average household size was 2.35 and the average family size was 2.90.

In the CDP, the population was spread out, with 23.3% under the age of 18, 5.8% from 18 to 24, 24.0% from 25 to 44, 28.5% from 45 to 64, and 18.4% who were 65 years of age or older. The median age was 43 years. For every 100 females, there were 86.1 males. For every 100 females age 18 and over, there were 85.5 males.

The median income for a household in the CDP was $31,324, and the median income for a family was $36,875. Males had a median income of $34,167 versus $17,250 for females. The per capita income for the CDP was $16,754. About 6.2% of families and 10.1% of the population were below the poverty line, including 13.8% of those under age 18 and 6.2% of those age 65 or over.
