= Pymatuning State Park (Pennsylvania) =

State park in Crawford County, Pennsylvania

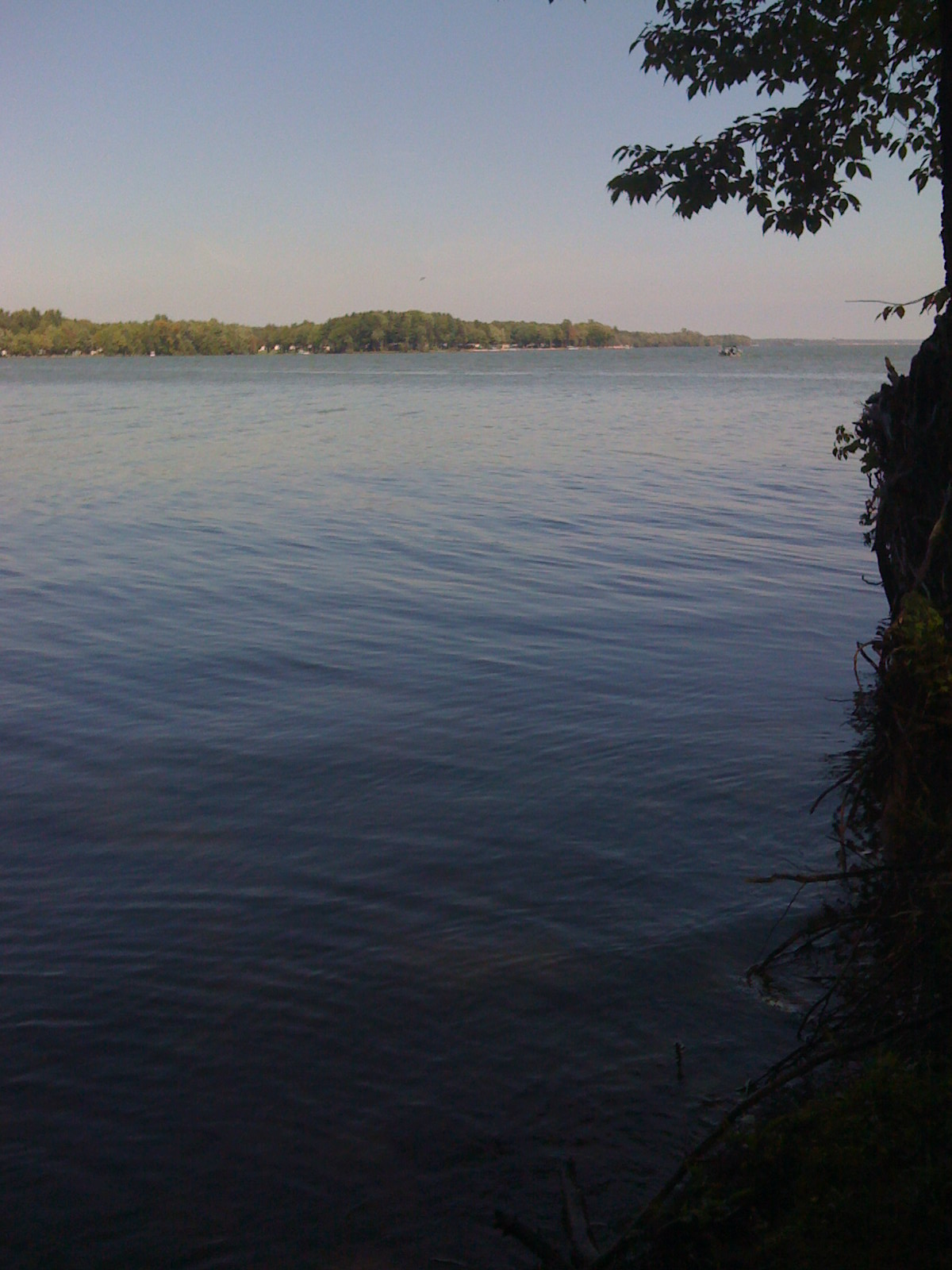

- Location within Pennsylvania Location within the United States
- Interactive map of Pymatuning State Park
- Location: Crawford County, Pennsylvania, United States
- Coordinates: 41°29′58″N 80°28′04″W
- Area: 16,892 acres (6,836 ha)
- Elevation: 1,017 feet (310 m)
- Established: 1934
- Administrator: Pennsylvania Department of Conservation and Natural Resources
- Website: Official website
- Pennsylvania State Parks

Pymatuning State Park is a Pennsylvania state park covering 21,122 acres (8,548 ha) in Conneaut, North Shenango, Pine, Sadsbury, South Shenango, West Fallowfield, and West Shenango Townships in Crawford County, Pennsylvania, in the United States. Pymatuning State Park is the largest state park in Pennsylvania and contains the 17,088-acre (69.15 km^{2}) Pymatuning Lake, three-quarters of which is in Pennsylvania and one-quarter of which is in Ohio. A 1.7-mile (2.7 km) causeway extends between Pennsylvania and Ohio near the center of the lake. The lake provides fishing and boating year-round. The two natural areas are Clark Island (161 acres [0.65 km^{2}]) and Blackjack (725 acres [2.93 km^{2}]) in the park. The park is also home to the University of Pittsburgh's Pymatuning Laboratory of Ecology. Like all Pennsylvania state parks, admission to the Pymatuning State Park is free. The northern access for Pymatuning State Park can be reached from U.S. Route 6 and the southern access is reached from U.S. Route 322.

Pymatuning State Park was chosen by the Pennsylvania Department of Conservation and Natural Resources (DCNR) and its Bureau of Parks as one of "25 Must-See Pennsylvania State Parks".

The park was the only state park in Pennsylvania with camping facilities in the path of totality for the solar eclipse of April 8, 2024.

== History ==
=== Native Americans ===
Pymatuning State Park is on land that was once a very large swamp. The first known inhabitants were the Mound Builders. Two of their mounds were flooded over by the creation of Pymatuning Lake. The Lenape were living in the area when European settlers first came to the area. The lake is named for the chief, who lived in the area at the time, Pihmtomink. The Lenape were pushed out of the area by the Seneca tribe a member of the larger Iroquois Confederacy. The Seneca were defeated by General Anthony Wayne's forces during the Northwest Indian War and left the area under the terms of the Treaty of Greenville. This treaty marked the beginning of the white man's domination of the area.

=== From swamplands to parklands ===
The first settlers to the area were farmers. Life was not easy for the farmers. The land was very swampy and very difficult to reclaim. Farm animals that wandered off were often lost in the quicksands of the swamp or fell prey to predators, such as foxes, bears, and mountain lions. The swamps were infested with mosquitoes that brought yellow fever to the settlers.

Building a dam on the Shenango River was first explored in 1911. A massive flood in 1913 caused $3 million (equivalent to $71.8 million in 2025) in damage and took several lives. The Pennsylvania General Assembly approved a budget of $1.2 million (equivalent to $28.7 million in 2025) to build at dam across the Shenango, but Governor John K. Tener slashed the budget to just $100,000 (equivalent to $2.39 million in 2025). The legislature took action again in 1917. This time approving a $400,000 budget (equivalent to $6.61 million in 2025) under the condition that the needed land in Ohio be purchased by the private sector. The Pymatuning Land Company was formed and raised the needed funds to purchase the needed Ohio properties. The land was finally acquired in full by 1931 when Governor Gifford Pinchot approved $1.5 million (equivalent to $25.5 million in 2025) to complete the dam. About 7,000 men began work on the dam in 1931, and the project was completed in 1934. The final cost of building the dam was $3,717,739 (equivalent to $89 million in 2025); and the lake now holds 64,275 million US gal (243.31 million m^{3}) of water, covering 17,088 acres (69.15 km^{2}) over a length of 17 miles (27 km) with a width of 1.6 miles (2.6 km) at the widest and 70 miles (110 km) of shoreline with a maximum depth of 35 feet (11 m).

== Pymatuning Lake ==
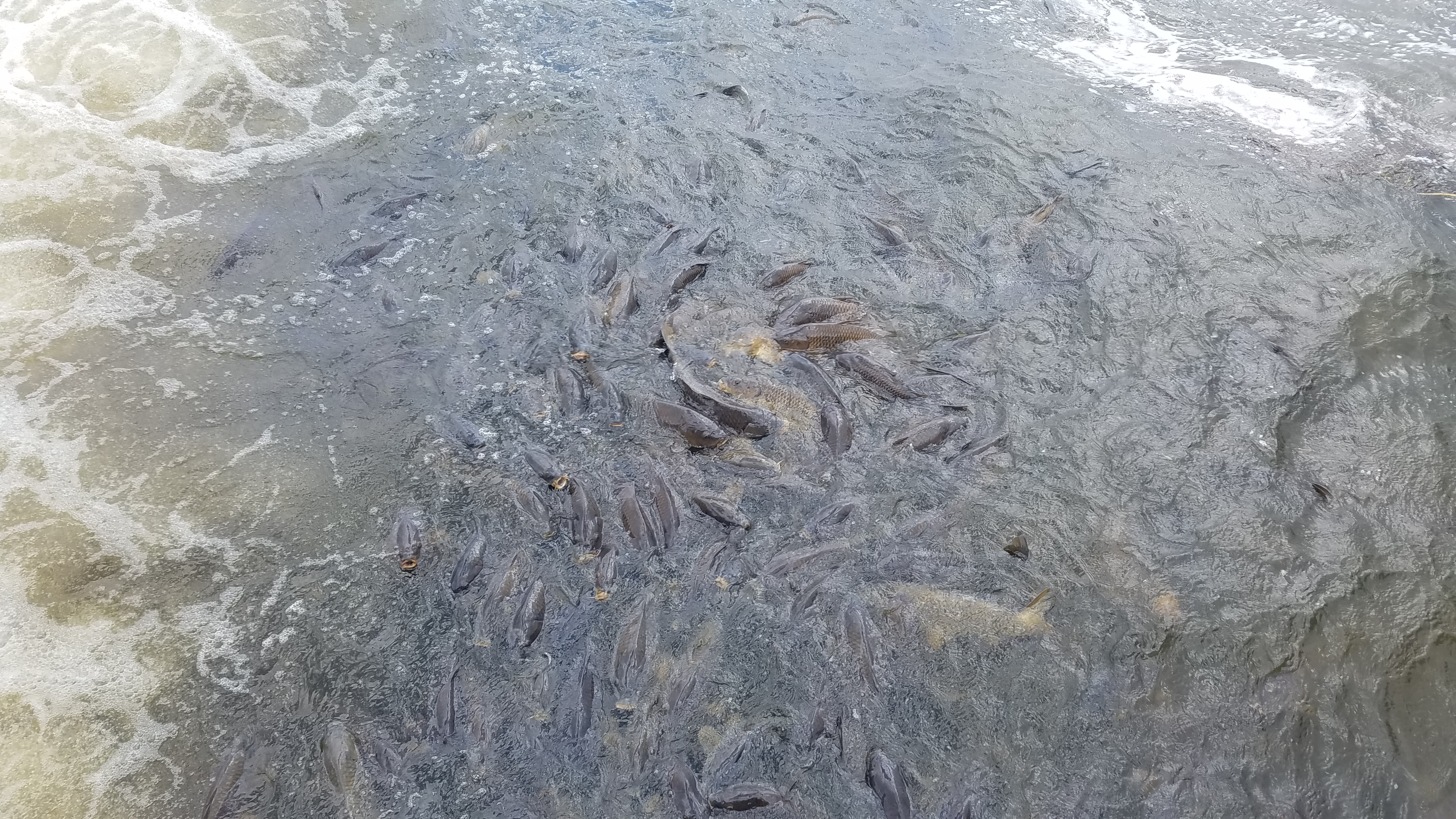
Carp devouring bread in the Pymatuning Spillway.

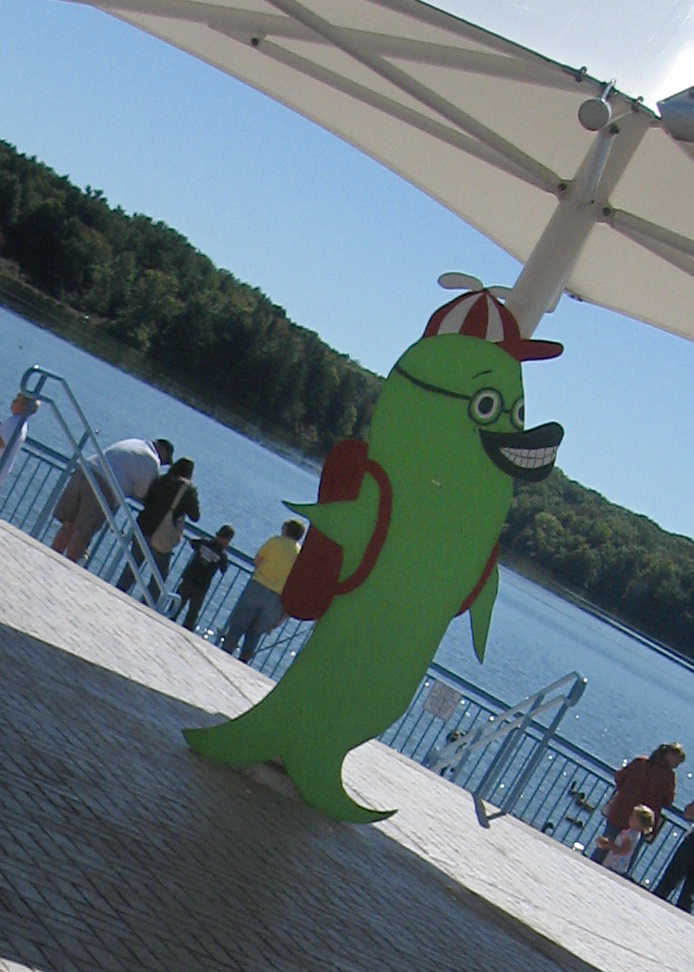
Spillway observation point noted for watching carp

Pymatuning Lake was formed in the 1930s by a dam on the Shenango River. The lake features several beaches and camping areas in both Pennsylvania and Ohio. The northeastern part of Pymatuning Lake, east of the spillway and three miles (5 km) south of Linesville, is a protected gameland area where colonies of 20,000 Canada geese and many more ducks winter each year. The lake is the result of an earthen dam three miles (5 km) north of Jamestown, Pennsylvania, whose outflow forms the Shenango River. A north-south spillway crosses the northern part of the lake, with the gameland area on the east side.

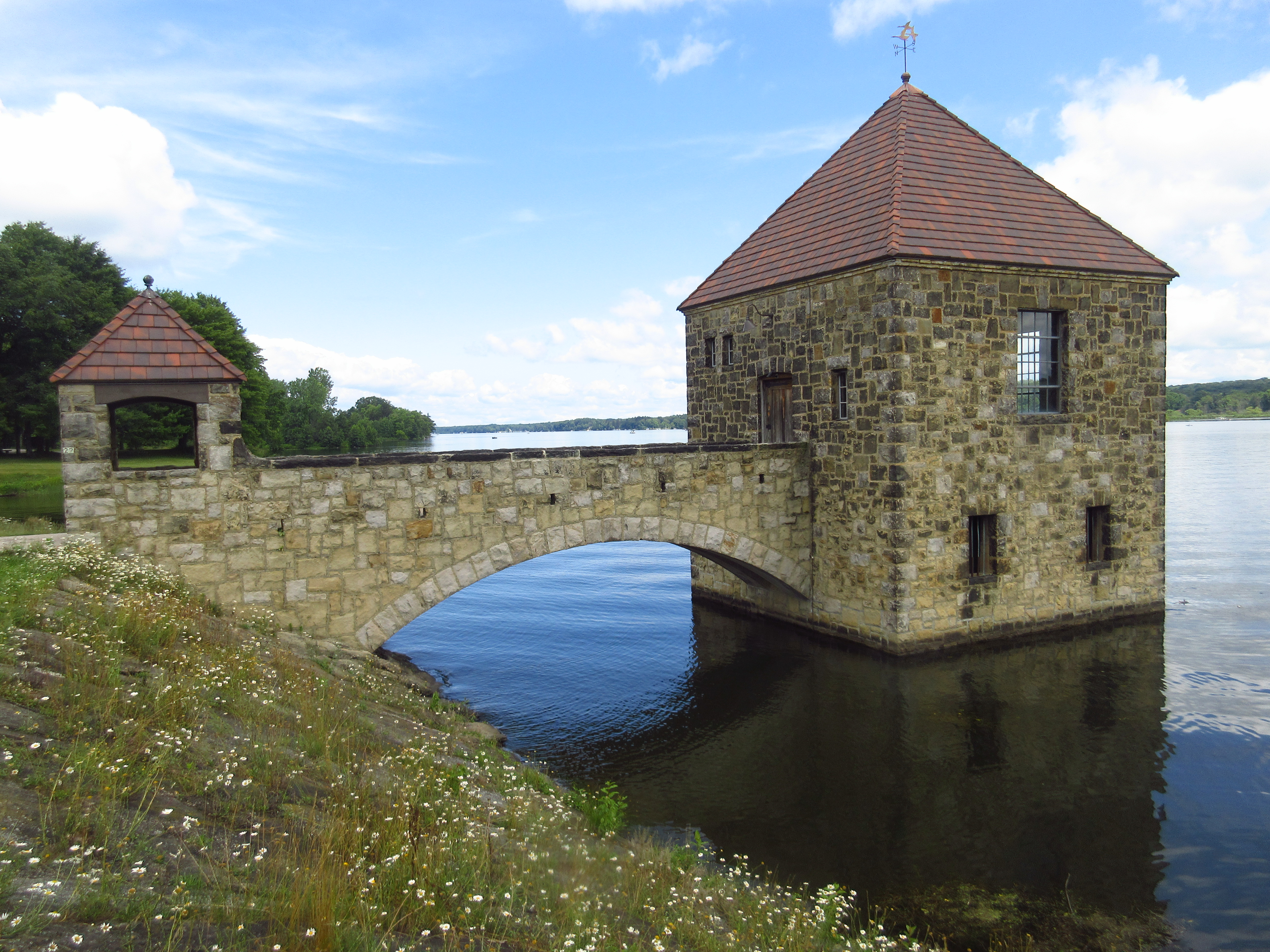
The gatehouse at the head of the lake adjacent to the dam.

Along this spillway are a wildlife museum and the Linesville spillway, a site famous as the "Place Where the Ducks Walk on the Fishes' Backs". Many people throw bread into the water here, and the resulting density of fish (carp) enables the ducks and other waterfowl to walk on top of the carp to vie for the thrown food. The spillway was renovated in 2007. The Pennsylvania Department of Conservation and Natural Resources had planned to prohibit bread as food for the carp and ducks on January 1, 2009, only permitting commercial fish food as part of an effort to clean up the area and increase its wild nature, but subsequently reconsidered.

The lake's embankment dam features a gatehouse built in 1934 which houses technical systems to ensure the dam is functioning properly. After decades of use, the gatehouse underwent a four-year renovation that completed in 2017. As part of the renovation the gatehouse had Ludowici clay tiles returned to its roof and saw masonry repairs and other cosmetic restoration. More significant work was out of sight but included trash rack repairs, gate cleaning, and engineering system improvements.

=== Boating ===
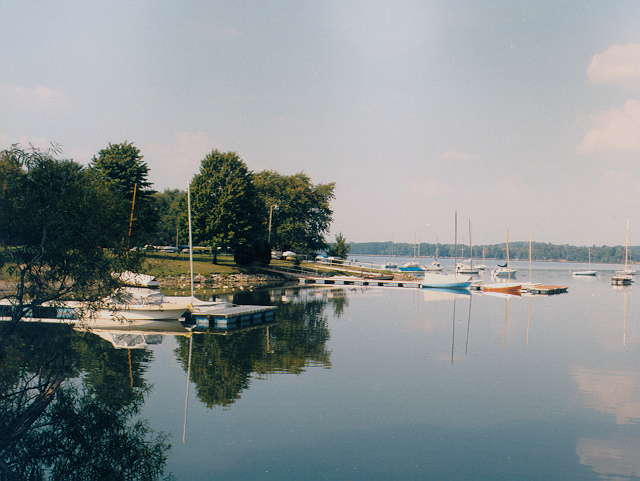
Boats on Pymatuning Lake

Motorboats up to 20 horsepower (15 kW) are permitted on Pymatuning Lake. All boats must have a current registration with any state or a launch permit from the Pennsylvania Fish and Boat Commission. Three marinas are in the Pennsylvania-owned part of the lake. These marinas have mooring facilities and rent pontoon boats, rowboats, motorboats, canoes, and motors. They also have stores that sell bait, tackle, and snacks.

=== Fishing ===
Pymatuning State Park is open for year-round fishing on Pymatuning Lake. It is a warm-water fishery. The most common species are largemouth and smallmouth bass, walleye, bluegill, crappie, perch, carp, and muskellunge. The lake is a popular ice fishing destination during the winter. All anglers are expected to follow the rules and regulations of the fish commission. Licenses from Ohio and Pennsylvania are permitted if the fishermen are fishing from a boat in any section of the lake. Only Pennsylvania licensed fishermen can fish from the Pennsylvania shore and only Ohio licensed fishermen are permitted to fish from the Ohio shore.

One of the largest warm-water fish hatcheries in the world is owned and operated by the Pennsylvania Fish and Boat Commission at Pymatuning State Park.

=== Swimming ===
Four beaches are open to the public at Pymatuning State Park. All four are open from 8:00 am until sunset beginning in late May and ending mid-September. Lifeguards are not posted at the beach. Swimming is at one's own risk. The beaches do have bathhouses with restrooms.

== Wildlife ==
Pymatuning State Park is home to a wide variety of wildlife. Bald eagles make their nests in the trees on the lake shores. Migratory and resident waterfowl thrive in the waters of the lake. The Pennsylvania Game Commission operates a waterfowl museum at the park. The land surrounding the lake is ideal habitat for white-tailed deer and other woodland animals.

== Hunting ==
Hunting is permitted on about 10,300 acres (4,200 ha) of Pymatuning State Park. Hunters are expected to follow the rules and regulations of the Pennsylvania Game Commission. The common game species are squirrels, waterfowl, white-tailed deer, and rabbits. The hunting of groundhogs is prohibited. Special areas of the lake are set aside for waterfowl hunting.

== Staying overnight ==
Pymatuning State Park is open for overnight guests beginning in mid-April and ending in late October.

Two camping areas at the park are near the lake and have a sanitary dumping station. Linesville Campground is in the northern part of the park. It has modern facilities including modern bathhouses with flush toilets and hot showers. Tuttle Campground is closed. Jamestown campground is within walking distance of small stores that sell a variety of camping supplies and groceries. Laundry facilities are located at each of the stores.

Twenty-five modern cabins are available to rent at Pymatuning State Park. Each has a furnished living area, a kitchen, dining area, restroom, and two or three bedrooms. Bed linens, towels, tableware, and cookware are not provided.
