= Pymatuning Central, Pennsylvania =

Unincorporated community in Pennsylvania, US

Pymatuning Central
- Census-designated place
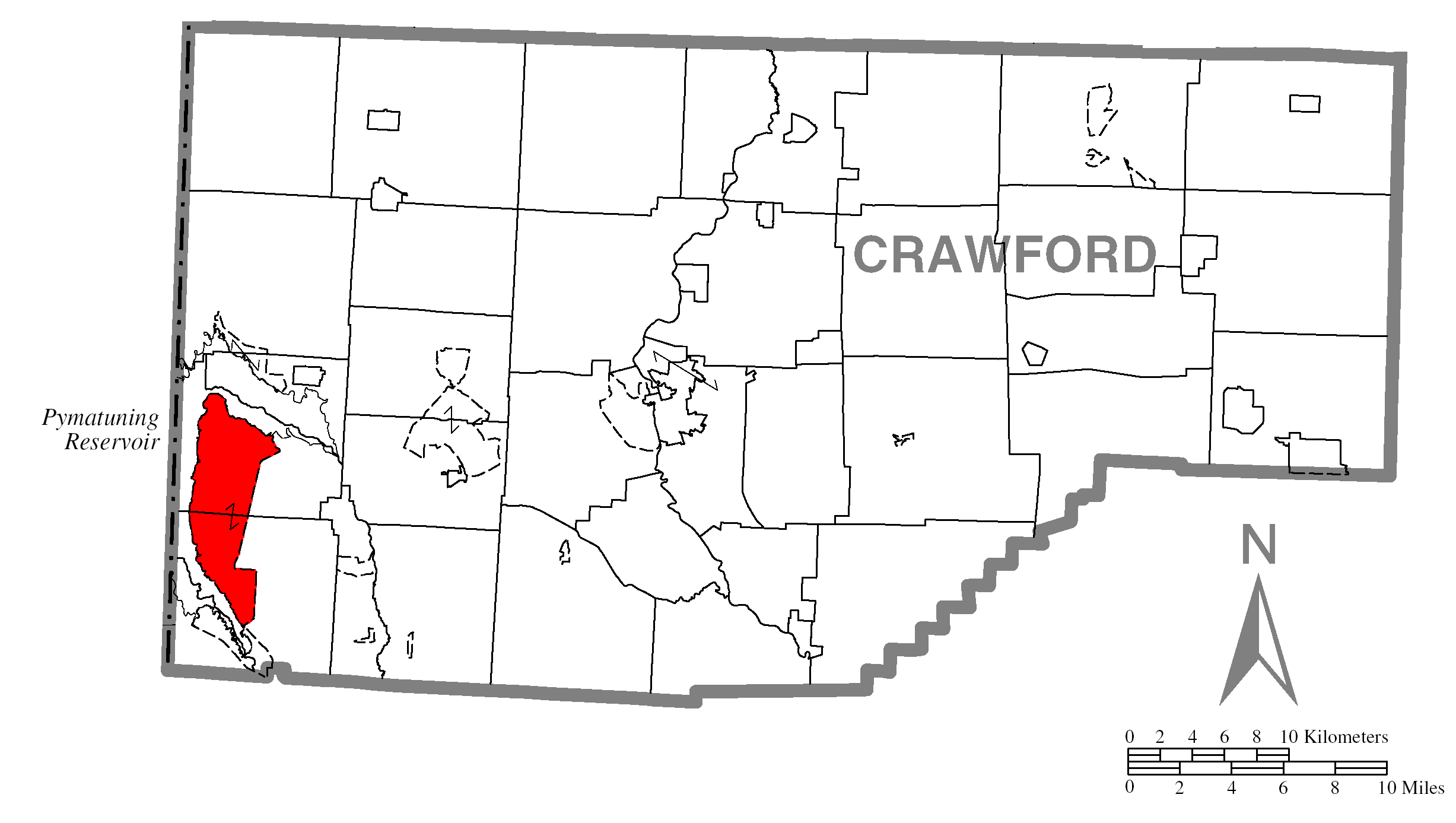
- Location of Pymatuning Central in Crawford County

- Location of Crawford County in Pennsylvania
- Coordinates: 41°34′47″N 80°29′8″W
- Country: United States
- State: Pennsylvania
- County: Crawford County
- Townships: North Shenango, South Shenango

Area
  - Total: 16.43 sq mi (42.56 km^{2})
  - Land: 16.37 sq mi (42.40 km^{2})
  - Water: 0.062 sq mi (0.16 km^{2})
- Elevation: 1,080 ft (330 m)

Population (2020)
  - Total: 2,054
  - Density: 125.5/sq mi (48.45/km^{2})
- Time zone: UTC-4 (EST)
  - Summer (DST): UTC-5 (EDT)
- Area code: 814
- FIPS code: 42-63009

Pymatuning Central is a census-designated place (CDP) in Crawford County, Pennsylvania, United States. The population was 2,269 at the 2010 census.

== Geography ==
Pymatuning Central is located in southwestern Crawford County at 41°34′47″N 80°29′8″W (41.579639, -80.485570), on the eastern shore of Pymatuning Reservoir, one of the largest reservoirs in Pennsylvania. The CDP is in North Shenango and South Shenango townships and includes the unincorporated communities of Espyville and Westford.

According to the United States Census Bureau, the CDP has a total area of 16.4 square miles (42.6 km^{2}), of which 16.4 square miles (42.4 km^{2}) is land and 0.1 square miles (0.2 km^{2}), or 0.38%, is water.

== Demographics ==
Historical population
Census	Pop.	Note	%±
2020	2,054		—
U.S. Decennial Census

As of the census of 2000, there were 2,216 people, 998 households, and 667 families residing in the CDP. The population density was 135.3 inhabitants per square mile (52.2/km^{2}). There were 2,713 housing units at an average density of 165.6 per square mile (63.9/km^{2}). The racial makeup of the CDP was 98.87% White, 0.23% African American, 0.18% Native American, 0.09% Asian, 0.05% Pacific Islander, and 0.59% from two or more races. Hispanic or Latino of any race were 0.41% of the population.

There were 998 households, out of which 19.2% had children under the age of 18 living with them, 57.0% were married couples living together, 6.2% had a female householder with no husband present, and 33.1% were non-families. 27.3% of all households were made up of individuals, and 14.0% had someone living alone who was 65 years of age or older. The average household size was 2.22 and the average family size was 2.65.

In the CDP, the population was spread out, with 18.1% under the age of 18, 3.8% from 18 to 24, 22.0% from 25 to 44, 30.6% from 45 to 64, and 25.5% who were 65 years of age or older. The median age was 49 years. For every 100 females, there were 100.0 males. For every 100 females age 18 and over, there were 100.7 males.

The median income for a household in the CDP was $28,607, and the median income for a family was $34,536. Males had a median income of $31,544 versus $20,238 for females. The per capita income for the CDP was $16,923. About 7.6% of families and 12.3% of the population were below the poverty line, including 17.6% of those under age 18 and 5.8% of those age 65 or over.
