= Crawford County, Pennsylvania =

County in Pennsylvania, United States

- County
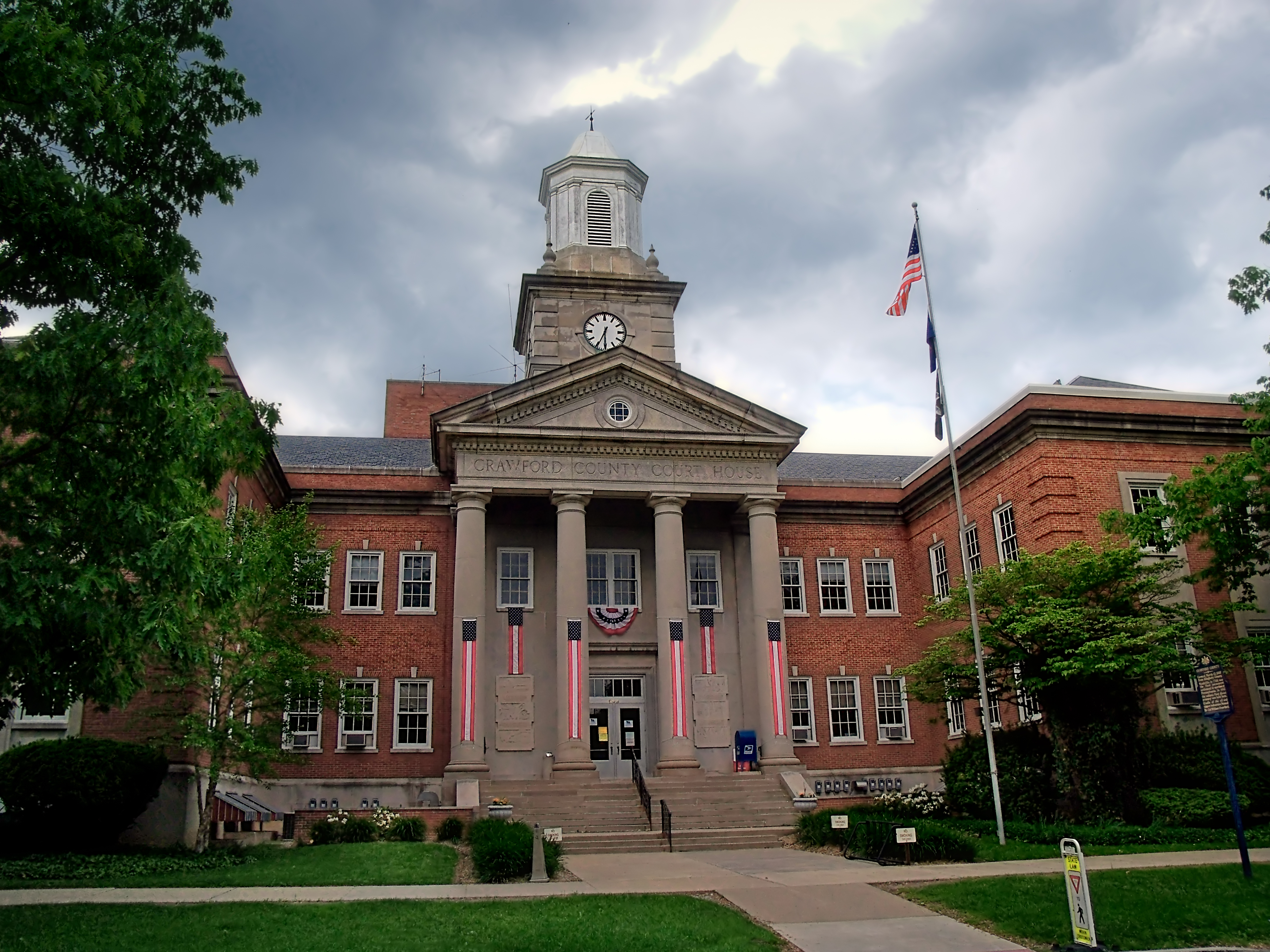
- The Crawford County Courthouse in Meadville

- Flag Seal

- Location within the U.S. state of Pennsylvania
- Coordinates: 41°41′N 80°07′W
- Country: United States
- State: Pennsylvania
- Founded: March 12, 1800
- Named for: William Crawford
- Seat: Meadville
- Largest city: Meadville

Area
  - Total: 1,038 sq mi (2,690 km^{2})
  - Land: 1,012 sq mi (2,620 km^{2})
  - Water: 25 sq mi (65 km^{2}) 2.4%

Population (2020)
  - Total: 83,938
  - Estimate (2025): 81,792 ▼
  - Density: 81/sq mi (31/km^{2})
- Time zone: UTC−5 (Eastern)
  - Summer (DST): UTC−4 (EDT)
- Congressional district: 16th
- Website: www.crawfordcountypa.net

Pennsylvania Historical Marker
- Designated: May 12, 1982

Crawford County is a county in the Commonwealth of Pennsylvania. As of the 2020 census, the population was 83,938. Its county seat is Meadville. The county was created on March 12, 1800, from part of Allegheny County and named for Colonel William Crawford. The county is part of the Northwest region of the commonwealth. (Note: Includes Erie, Mercer, Crawford and Venango Counties)

Crawford County comprises the Meadville micropolitan statistical area, which is also included in the Erie-Meadville combined statistical area.

== Geography ==
According to the U.S. Census Bureau, the county has a total area of 1,038 square miles (2,690 km^{2}), of which 25 square miles (65 km^{2}) (2.4%) are covered by water. It has a warm-summer humid continental climate (Dfb) and average monthly temperatures in Meadville range from 24.9 °F in January to 69.5 °F in July, while in Titusville they range from 24.2 °F in January to 68.8 °F in July.

=== Adjacent counties ===
- Erie County (north)
- Warren County (east)
- Venango County (southeast)
- Mercer County (south)
- Trumbull County, Ohio (southwest)
- Ashtabula County, Ohio (west)

=== National protected area ===
- Erie National Wildlife Refuge

=== State protected area ===
Pymatuning State Park is on Pymatuning Reservoir.

=== Major highways ===
- I-79
- US 6
- US 19
- US 322
- PA 8
- PA 8 Truck
- PA 18
- PA 27
- PA 27 Truck
- PA 77
- PA 86
- PA 89
- PA 98
- PA 99
- PA 102
- PA 173
- PA 198
- PA 285
- PA 408
- PA 428

== Demographics ==
Historical population
Census	Pop.	Note	%±
1800	2,346		—
1810	6,178		163.3%
1820	9,397		52.1%
1830	16,030		70.6%
1840	31,724		97.9%
1850	37,849		19.3%
1860	48,755		28.8%
1870	63,832		30.9%
1880	68,607		7.5%
1890	65,324		−4.8%
1900	63,643		−2.6%
1910	61,565		−3.3%
1920	60,667		−1.5%
1930	62,980		3.8%
1940	71,644		13.8%
1950	78,948		10.2%
1960	77,956		−1.3%
1970	81,342		4.3%
1980	88,869		9.3%
1990	86,169		−3.0%
2000	90,367		4.9%
2010	88,765		−1.8%
2020	83,938		−5.4%
2025 (est.)	81,792	▼	−2.6%

=== Racial and ethnic composition ===
Crawford County, Pennsylvania – Racial and ethnic composition Note: the US Census treats Hispanic/Latino as an ethnic category. This table excludes Latinos from the racial categories and assigns them to a separate category. Hispanics/Latinos may be of any race.
Race / Ethnicity (NH = Non-Hispanic)	Pop 1980	Pop 1990	Pop 2000	Pop 2010	Pop 2020	% 1980	% 1990	% 2000	% 2010	% 2020
White alone (NH)	87,101	84,381	87,263	84,930	77,347	98.01%	97.93%	96.57%	95.68%	92.15%
Black or African American alone (NH)	1,076	1,058	1,428	1,503	1,496	1.21%	1.23%	1.58%	1.69%	1.78%
Native American or Alaska Native alone (NH)	115	108	174	150	109	0.13%	0.13%	0.19%	0.17%	0.13%
Asian alone (NH)	186	272	254	397	365	0.21%	0.32%	0.28%	0.45%	0.43%
Native Hawaiian or Pacific Islander alone (NH)	x	x	22	13	26	x	x	0.02%	0.01%	0.03%
Other race alone (NH)	60	47	46	27	229	0.07%	0.05%	0.05%	0.03%	0.27%
Mixed race or Multiracial (NH)	x	x	642	922	3,125	x	x	0.71%	1.04%	3.72%
Hispanic or Latino (any race)	331	303	537	823	1,241	0.37%	0.35%	0.59%	0.93%	1.48%
Total	88,869	86,169	90,366	88,765	83,938	100.00%	100.00%	100.00%	100.00%	100.00%

=== 2020 census ===
As of the 2020 census, the county had a population of 83,938. The median age was 44.2 years. 20.6% of residents were under the age of 18 and 21.9% of residents were 65 years of age or older. For every 100 females there were 95.4 males, and for every 100 females age 18 and over there were 93.4 males age 18 and over.

The racial makeup of the county was 92.7% White, 1.8% Black or African American, 0.1% American Indian and Alaska Native, 0.4% Asian, <0.1% Native Hawaiian and Pacific Islander, 0.6% from some other race, and 4.2% from two or more races. Hispanic or Latino residents of any race comprised 1.5% of the population.

34.2% of residents lived in urban areas, while 65.8% lived in rural areas.

There were 33,930 households in the county, of which 25.1% had children under the age of 18 living in them. Of all households, 47.8% were married-couple households, 19.8% were households with a male householder and no spouse or partner present, and 24.7% were households with a female householder and no spouse or partner present. About 30.8% of all households were made up of individuals and 14.8% had someone living alone who was 65 years of age or older.

There were 42,063 housing units, of which 19.3% were vacant. Among occupied housing units, 72.1% were owner-occupied and 27.9% were renter-occupied. The homeowner vacancy rate was 1.7% and the rental vacancy rate was 7.8%.

=== 2000 census ===
As of the 2000 census, 90,366 people, 34,678 households, and 23,858 families were residing in the county. The population density was 89 people per square mile (34 people/km^{2}). The 42,416 housing units had an average density of 42 units per square mile (16/km^{2}). The racial makeup of the county was 97.00% White, 1.59% African American, 0.20% Native American, 0.28% Asian, 0.03% Pacific Islander, 0.13% from other races, and 0.77% from two or more races. About 0.59% of the population were Hispanics or Latinos of any race. About 45.1% were self-described English or Welsh, 10.9% American, 10.3% German, 8.2% Irish, 7.8% Scotch-Irish or Scottish, 3.8% Italian 2.6% Dutch, and 2.3% French by ancestry.

Of the 34,678 households, 30.4% had children under 18 living with them, 55.6% were married couples living together, 9.2% had a female householder with no husband present, and 31.2% were not families. About 26.2% of all households were made up of individuals, and 11.6% had someone living alone who was 65 or older. The average household size was 2.50 and the average family size was 3.01.

In the county, the age distribution was 24.7% under 18, 9.2% from 18 to 24, 26.6% from 25 to 44, 23.9% from 45 to 64, and 15.6% who were 65 or older. The median age was 38 years. For every 100 females, there were 94.8 males. For every 100 females age 18 and over, there were 90.8 males.

== Micropolitan statistical area ==
The United States Office of Management and Budget has designated Crawford County as the 'Meadville, PA micropolitan statistical area. As of the 2010 census the micropolitan area ranked fifth-most populous in Pennsylvania and the 52nd-most populous in the United States with a population of 88,765. Crawford County is also a part of the Erie-Meadville combined statistical area, which combines the population of both Crawford County and Erie County. The combined statistical area ranked seventh in Pennsylvania and 102nd-most populous in the United States with a population of 369,331.

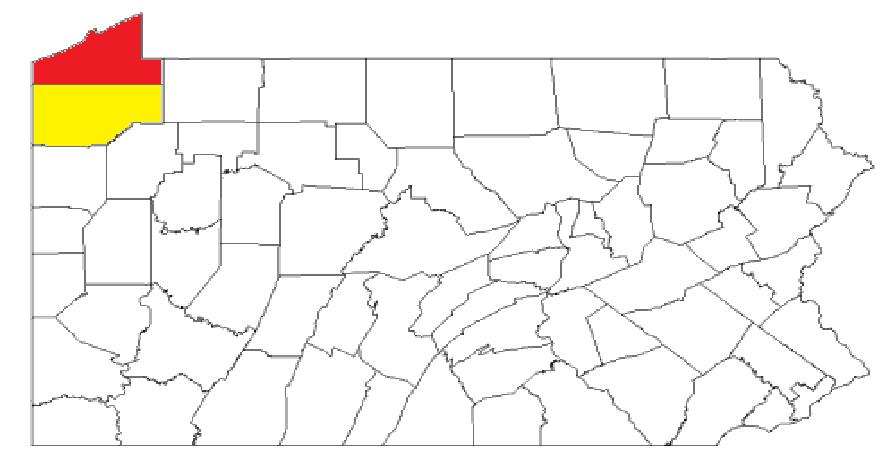
Map of the Erie-Meadville, PA Combined Statistical Area (CSA), composed of the following parts: Erie, PA Metropolitan Statistical Area Meadville, PA Micropolitan Statistical Area

== Government ==
United States presidential election results for Crawford County, Pennsylvania
Year	Republican		Democratic		Third party(ies)	
Year	No.	%	No.	%	No.	%
1888	8,040	53.59%	5,964	39.75%	999	6.66%
1892	7,152	47.30%	6,166	40.78%	1,804	11.93%
1896	7,851	47.26%	8,383	50.47%	377	2.27%
1900	7,705	49.97%	7,000	45.40%	713	4.62%
1904	7,450	59.03%	3,645	28.88%	1,525	12.08%
1908	7,679	52.58%	5,668	38.81%	1,258	8.61%
1912	2,497	20.56%	3,908	32.17%	5,742	47.27%
1916	5,487	44.18%	5,814	46.81%	1,119	9.01%
1920	10,032	62.31%	4,175	25.93%	1,892	11.75%
1924	10,918	63.09%	2,969	17.16%	3,418	19.75%
1928	17,072	71.17%	6,718	28.00%	199	0.83%
1932	10,918	51.72%	9,382	44.44%	811	3.84%
1936	14,463	51.31%	12,788	45.37%	938	3.33%
1940	15,891	60.62%	10,197	38.90%	125	0.48%
1944	15,205	61.83%	9,216	37.48%	170	0.69%
1948	14,161	60.69%	9,174	39.31%	0	0.00%
1952	19,079	65.49%	9,874	33.89%	181	0.62%
1956	18,887	66.65%	9,346	32.98%	104	0.37%
1960	18,754	60.68%	12,050	38.99%	102	0.33%
1964	10,664	36.78%	18,212	62.82%	115	0.40%
1968	14,991	53.11%	11,345	40.19%	1,890	6.70%
1972	18,393	64.38%	9,371	32.80%	805	2.82%
1976	15,301	49.99%	14,712	48.06%	597	1.95%
1980	16,552	53.55%	11,778	38.11%	2,579	8.34%
1984	20,181	60.80%	12,792	38.54%	222	0.67%
1988	17,249	56.32%	13,021	42.51%	358	1.17%
1992	14,112	40.75%	12,813	37.00%	7,703	22.25%
1996	14,659	46.62%	12,943	41.16%	3,844	12.22%
2000	18,858	56.58%	13,250	39.76%	1,220	3.66%
2004	21,965	57.32%	16,013	41.79%	344	0.90%
2008	20,750	54.17%	16,780	43.80%	777	2.03%
2012	20,901	58.75%	13,883	39.02%	791	2.22%
2016	24,987	66.08%	10,971	29.01%	1,855	4.91%
2020	28,561	67.82%	12,924	30.69%	629	1.49%
2024	29,685	69.04%	12,858	29.90%	456	1.06%

United States Senate election results for Crawford County, Pennsylvania1
Year	Republican		Democratic		Third party(ies)	
Year	No.	%	No.	%	No.	%
1994	16,552	62.59%	9,325	35.26%	569	2.15%
2000	20,280	63.53%	11,000	34.46%	642	2.01%
2006	14,260	51.41%	13,480	48.59%	0	0.00%
2012	21,140	60.03%	13,146	37.33%	927	2.63%
2018	17,813	59.31%	11,720	39.02%	502	1.67%
2024	28,234	66.10%	13,370	31.30%	1,110	2.60%

United States Senate election results for Crawford County, Pennsylvania3
Year	Republican		Democratic		Third party(ies)	
Year	No.	%	No.	%	No.	%
1992	16,580	50.31%	13,972	42.40%	2,404	7.29%
1998	13,763	66.65%	5,986	28.99%	902	4.37%
2004	23,038	64.19%	11,070	30.84%	1,784	4.97%
2010	16,725	62.62%	9,985	37.38%	0	0.00%
2016	24,472	65.68%	11,047	29.65%	1,740	4.67%
2022	20,992	63.55%	11,081	33.55%	960	2.91%

Pennsylvania Gubernatorial election results for Crawford County
Year	Republican		Democratic		Third party(ies)	
Year	No.	%	No.	%	No.	%
1970	10,043	43.55%	11,885	51.54%	1,133	4.91%
1974	12,830	58.54%	8,701	39.70%	387	1.77%
1978	13,214	55.81%	10,185	43.02%	278	1.17%
1982	14,654	55.44%	11,511	43.55%	269	1.02%
1986	12,546	53.19%	10,859	46.04%	183	0.78%
1990	8,056	33.25%	16,154	66.68%	15	0.06%
1994	19,508	69.52%	5,689	20.27%	2,864	10.21%
1998	13,875	63.30%	4,786	21.83%	3,260	14.87%
2002	15,551	60.71%	9,155	35.74%	909	3.55%
2006	16,202	58.08%	11,695	41.92%	0	0.00%
2010	17,883	66.79%	8,891	33.21%	0	0.00%
2014	13,219	56.95%	9,994	43.05%	0	0.00%
2018	17,859	58.47%	12,137	39.74%	548	1.79%
2022	19,541	59.52%	12,609	38.41%	679	2.07%

=== Voter registration ===
Chart of Voter Registration
1. Republican (59.2%)
2. Democratic (29.0%)
3. Independent (8.11%)
4. Other Parties (3.69%)

As of February 6, 2024, there were 49,786 registered voters in Crawford County.

- Republican: 29,457 (59.17%)
- Democratic: 14,454 (29.03%)
- Independent: 4,039 (8.11%)
- Third Party: 1,836 (3.69%)

=== County Commissioners ===
Office	Holder	Party
Commissioner	Eric Henry	Republican
Commissioner	Scott T. Schell	Republican
Commissioner	Christopher R. Seeley	Democratic

=== Other County Row Officers ===
Office	Holder	Party
Clerk of Courts	Patti Wetherbee	Republican
County Auditor	Kelsey Zimmerman	Republican
County Auditor	Renee Kiser	Republican
County Auditor	Darien Pfaff	Democratic
County Coroner	Eric Coston	Republican
District Attorney	Paula DiGiacomo	Republican
Prothonotary	Emmy Arnett	Republican
Register & Recorder	Beth M. Forbes	Republican
Sheriff	Dave Powers	Republican
Treasurer	Chris Krzysiak	Republican

=== Pennsylvania Senate ===
District	Senator	Party
50	Michele Brooks	Republican

=== Pennsylvania House of Representatives ===
District	Representative	Party
6	Brad Roae	Republican
17	Parke Wentling	Republican
65	Kathy Rapp	Republican

=== United States House of Representatives ===
District	Representative	Party
16	Mike Kelly	Republican

=== United States Senate ===
Senator	Party
John Fetterman	Democrat
Dave McCormick	Republican

== Education ==
=== Colleges and universities ===
- Allegheny College, located in Meadville
- University of Pittsburgh at Titusville, a branch campus of the University of Pittsburgh, located in Titusville

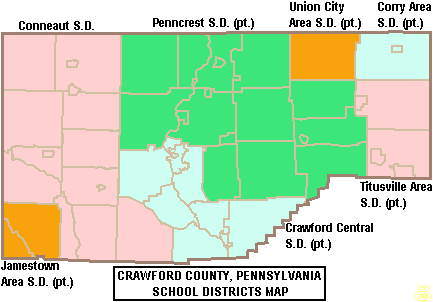
Map of Crawford County, Pennsylvania School Districts

=== Community, junior, and technical colleges ===
- Precision Manufacturing Institute (PMI)

Laurel Technical Institute (LTI)

=== Public school districts ===
School districts are:

- Conneaut School District
- Corry Area School District
- Crawford Central School District
- Jamestown Area School District
- Penncrest School District
- Titusville Area School District
- Union City Area School District

== Communities ==
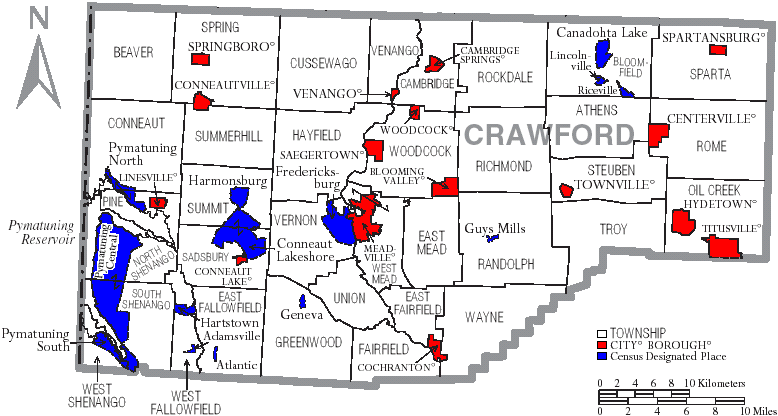
Map of Crawford County, Pennsylvania with Municipal Labels showing Cities and Boroughs (red), Townships (white), and Census-designated places (blue).

Under Pennsylvania law, the four types of incorporated municipalities are: cities, boroughs, townships, and, in at most two cases, towns. The following cities, boroughs, and townships are located in Crawford County:

=== Cities ===
- Meadville (county seat)
- Titusville

=== Boroughs ===
- Blooming Valley
- Cambridge Springs
- Centerville
- Cochranton
- Conneaut Lake
- Conneautville
- Hydetown
- Linesville
- Saegertown
- Spartansburg
- Springboro
- Townville
- Venango
- Woodcock

=== Townships ===
- Athens
- Beaver
- Bloomfield
- Cambridge
- Conneaut
- Cussewago
- East Fairfield
- East Fallowfield
- East Mead
- Fairfield
- Greenwood
- Hayfield
- North Shenango
- Oil Creek
- Pine
- Randolph
- Richmond
- Rockdale
- Rome
- Sadsbury
- South Shenango
- Sparta
- Spring
- Steuben
- Summerhill
- Summit
- Troy
- Union
- Venango
- Vernon
- Wayne
- West Fallowfield
- West Mead
- West Shenango
- Woodcock

=== Census-designated places ===
Census-designated places are geographical areas designated by the U.S. Census Bureau for the purposes of compiling demographic data. They are not actual jurisdictions under Pennsylvania law.

- Adamsville
- Atlantic
- Canadohta Lake
- Conneaut Lakeshore
- Fredericksburg
- Geneva
- Guys Mills
- Harmonsburg
- Hartstown
- Kerrtown
- Lincolnville
- Pymatuning Central
- Pymatuning North
- Pymatuning South
- Riceville

=== Unincorporated communities ===
- Buells Corners
- Custards
- Frenchtown
- Rundell

=== Population ranking ===
The population ranking of the following table is based on the 2010 census of Crawford County.

† county seat

Rank	City/Town/etc.	Municipal type	Population (2010 Census)
1	† Meadville	City	13,388
2	Titusville	City	5,601
3	Cambridge Springs	Borough	2,595
4	Conneaut Lakeshore	CDP	2,395
5	Pymatuning Central	CDP	2,269
6	Cochranton	Borough	1,136
7	Linesville	Borough	1,040
8	Saegertown	Borough	997
9	Conneautville	Borough	774
10	Fredericksburg	CDP	733
11	Conneaut Lake	Borough	653
12	Hydetown	Borough	526
13	Canadohta Lake	CDP	516
14	Pymatuning South	CDP	479
15	Springboro	Borough	477
16	Harmonsburg	CDP	401
17	Blooming Valley	Borough	337
18	Townville	Borough	323
19	Pymatuning North	CDP	311
T-20	Spartansburg	Borough	305
T-20	Kerrtown	CDP	305
21	Venango	Borough	239
22	Centerville	Borough	218
23	Hartstown	CDP	201
24	Woodcock	Borough	157
25	Guys Mills	CDP	124
26	Geneva	CDP	109
27	Lincolnville	CDP	96
28	Atlantic	CDP	77
29	Riceville	CDP	68
30	Adamsville	CDP	67

== Notable people ==
- The abolitionist John Brown lived in Crawford County for 11 years, more than he lived anywhere else. He was the first postmaster of Randolph Township, a position he held from 1828 to 1836, and he carried the mail from Meadville. In 1825 he started the county's first industry, a tannery, today the John Brown Farm, Tannery & Museum. In his barn, an Underground Railroad station, he had a secret, well-ventilated room in which to hide fugitive slaves. One reason he relocated to Crawford County, he said, was that it was a good location for helping them.
- Robert F. Kent (1911–1982) was born in Meadville and represented Crawford County in the Pennsylvania House of Representatives from 1947 to 1956. He was elected Pennsylvania State Treasurer in 1956 and held this office from January 1957 to January 1961.

== See also ==
- National Register of Historic Places listings in Crawford County, Pennsylvania
