= North Shenango Township, Pennsylvania =

Township in Pennsylvania, US

Coordinates: 41°38′00″N 80°30′59″W

North Shenango Township, Crawford County, Pennsylvania
- Township
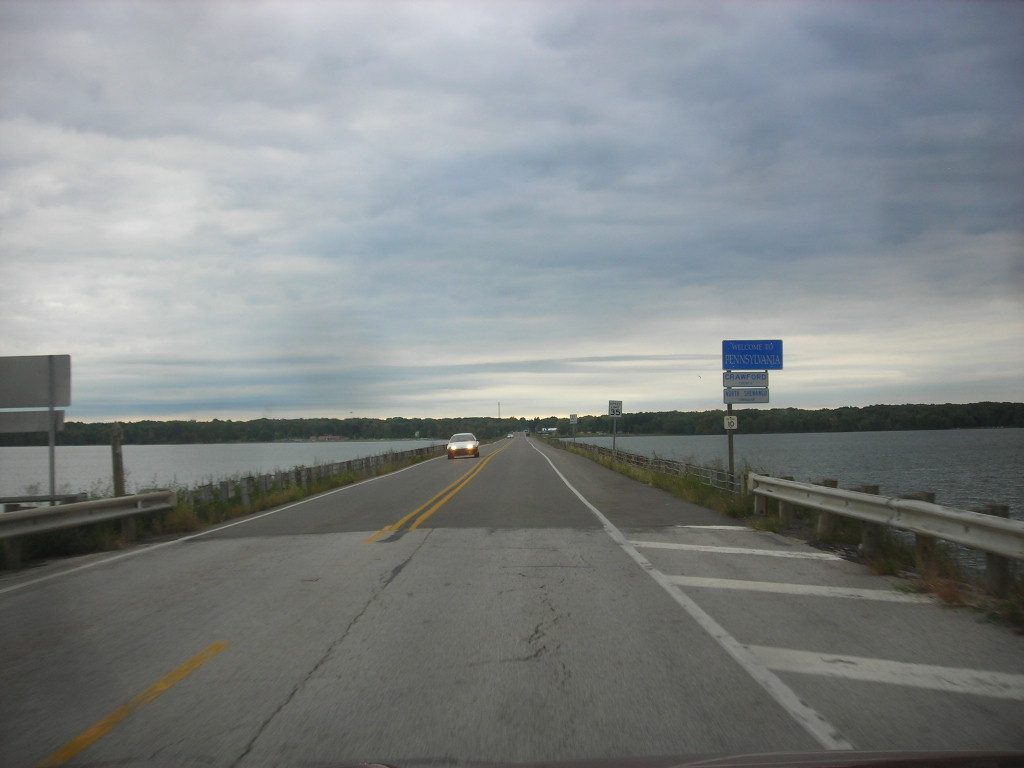
- Pymatuning Reservoir on the Ohio border

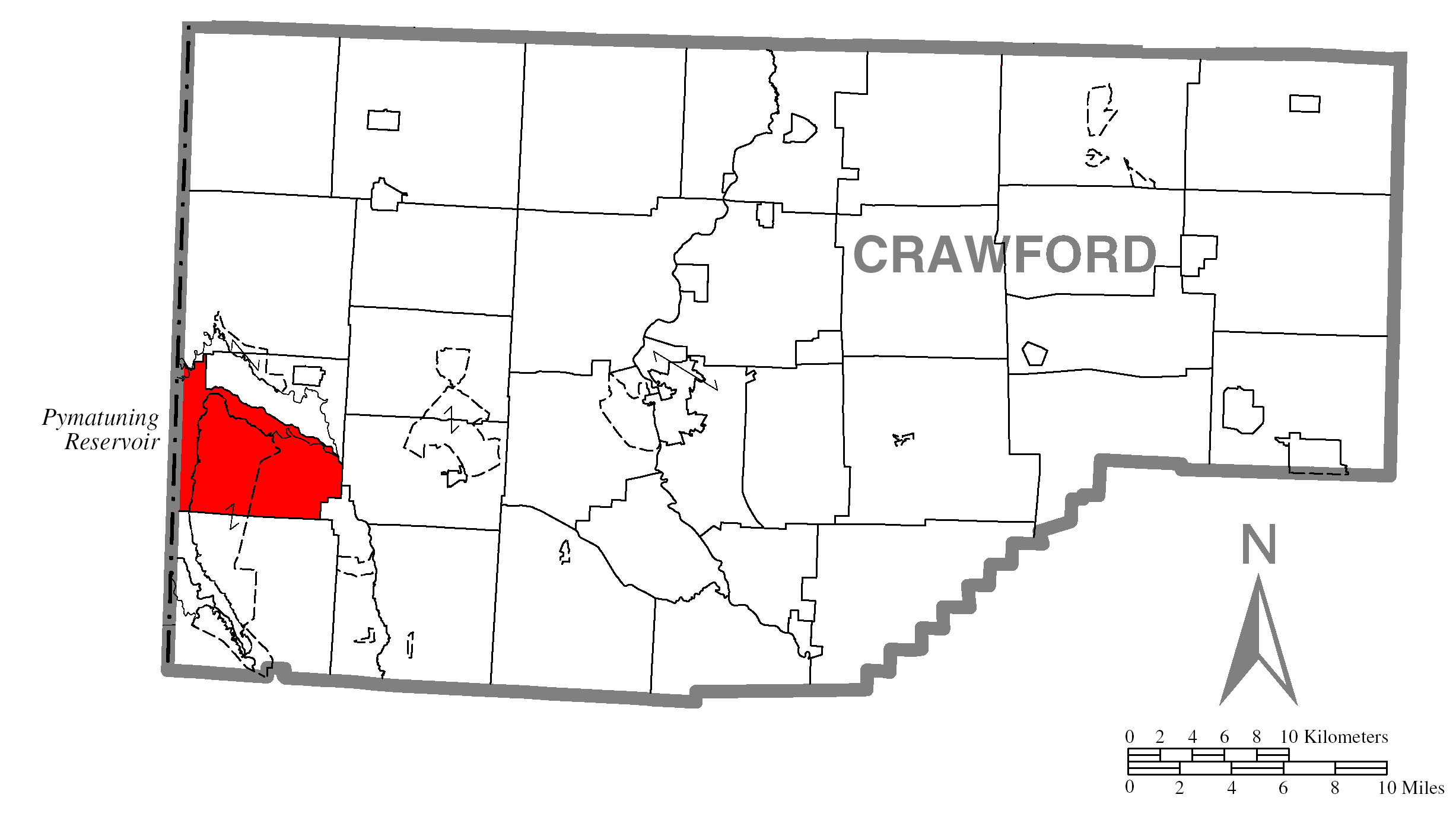
- Location of North Shenago Township in Crawford County

- Location of Crawford County in Pennsylvania
- Country: United States
- State: Pennsylvania
- County: Crawford County

Area
  - Total: 26.15 sq mi (67.74 km^{2})
  - Land: 18.75 sq mi (48.56 km^{2})
  - Water: 7.41 sq mi (19.18 km^{2})
- Highest elevation (south boundary, south of Stewartville): 1,208 ft (368 m)
- Lowest elevation (Pymatuning Lake): 1,008 ft (307 m)

Population (2020)
  - Total: 1,275 ▼
  - Estimate (2024): 1,285
  - Density: 73/sq mi (28/km^{2})
- Time zone: UTC-4 (EST)
  - Summer (DST): UTC-5 (EDT)
- Area code: 724
- FIPS code: 42-039-55408
- Website: www.northshenango.com

North Shenango Township is a township in Crawford County, Pennsylvania, United States. The population was 1,275 at the 2020 census, down from 1,410 at the 2010 census.

== Geography ==
The township is located in western Crawford County, bordered to the west by Ashtabula County in Ohio. According to the United States Census Bureau, the township has a total area of 26.1 square miles (67.7 km^{2}), of which 18.8 square miles (48.6 km^{2}) is land and 7.4 square miles (19.2 km^{2}), or 28.31%, is water. The northern and western sides of the township lie within Pymatuning Reservoir, one of the largest reservoirs in Pennsylvania.

The western half of the township is part of the Pymatuning Central census-designated place, primarily consisting of the unincorporated community of Espyville.

=== Natural Features ===
Geologic Province: Northwestern Glaciated Plateau
Lowest Elevation: 1,008 ft (307 m) Pymatuning Lake
Highest Elevation: 1,208 ft (368 m) south boundary, south of Stewartville, Pennsylvania.
Major Rivers/Streams and Watersheds: Shenango River (Pymatuning Lake)
Minor Rivers/Streams and Watersheds: Bennett Run
Lakes and Waterbodies:Pymatuning Lake
Biological Diversity Areas: Pymatuning Shoreline-Bottomland Forests BDA, Pymatuning Wetland Complex-North BDA
Landscape Conservation Areas: Pymatuning Marsh LCA

== Demographics ==
Historical population
Census	Pop.	Note	%±
2000	1,387		—
2010	1,410		1.7%
2020	1,275		−9.6%
2024 (est.)	1,285		0.8%
U.S. Decennial Census

As of the census of 2000, there were 1,387 people, 619 households, and 420 families residing in the township. The population density was 73.6 inhabitants per square mile (28.4/km^{2}). There were 1,728 housing units at an average density of 91.7 per square mile (35.4/km^{2}). The racial makeup of the township was 98.99% White, 0.14% African American, 0.14% Native American, 0.07% Pacific Islander, and 0.65% from two or more races. Hispanic or Latino of any race were 0.65% of the population.

There were 619 households, out of which 18.3% had children under the age of 18 living with them, 58.6% were married couples living together, 6.0% had a female householder with no husband present, and 32.0% were non-families. 26.8% of all households were made up of individuals, and 14.1% had someone living alone who was 65 years of age or older. The average household size was 2.24 and the average family size was 2.66.

In the township the population was spread out, with 17.3% under the age of 18, 4.8% from 18 to 24, 20.0% from 25 to 44, 32.7% from 45 to 64, and 25.2% who were 65 years of age or older. The median age was 50 years. For every 100 females, there were 99.0 males. For every 100 females age 18 and over, there were 98.8 males.

The median income for a household in the township was $28,207, and the median income for a family was $34,954. Males had a median income of $30,298 versus $18,846 for females. The per capita income for the township was $16,872. About 8.1% of families and 13.3% of the population were below the poverty line, including 16.7% of those under age 18 and 9.5% of those age 65 or over.
