= West Shenango Township, Pennsylvania =

Township in Pennsylvania, US

Coordinates: 41°31′00″N 80°30′59″W

West Shenango Township, Crawford County, Pennsylvania
- Township
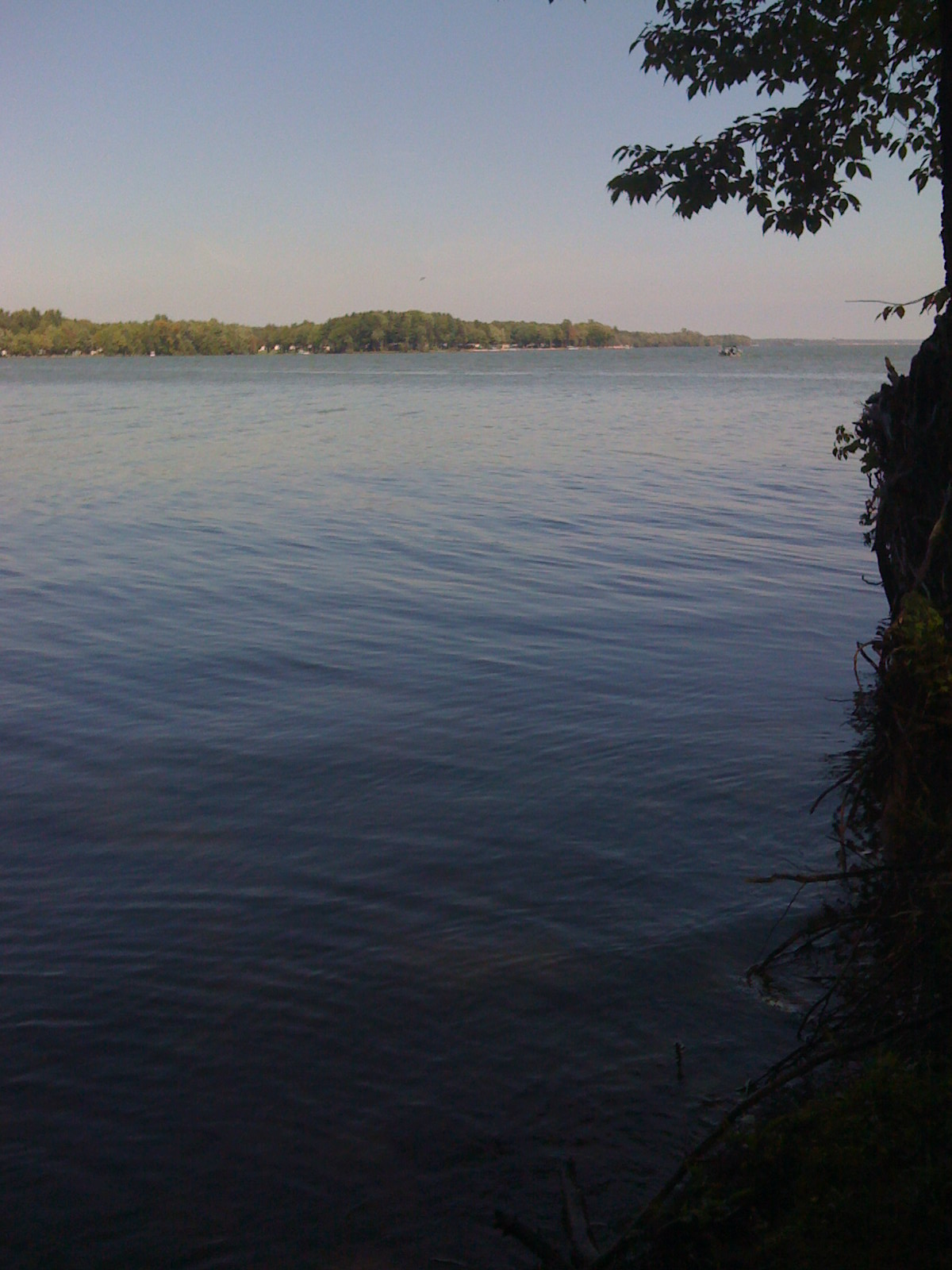
- Lakeshore at Pymatuning State Park

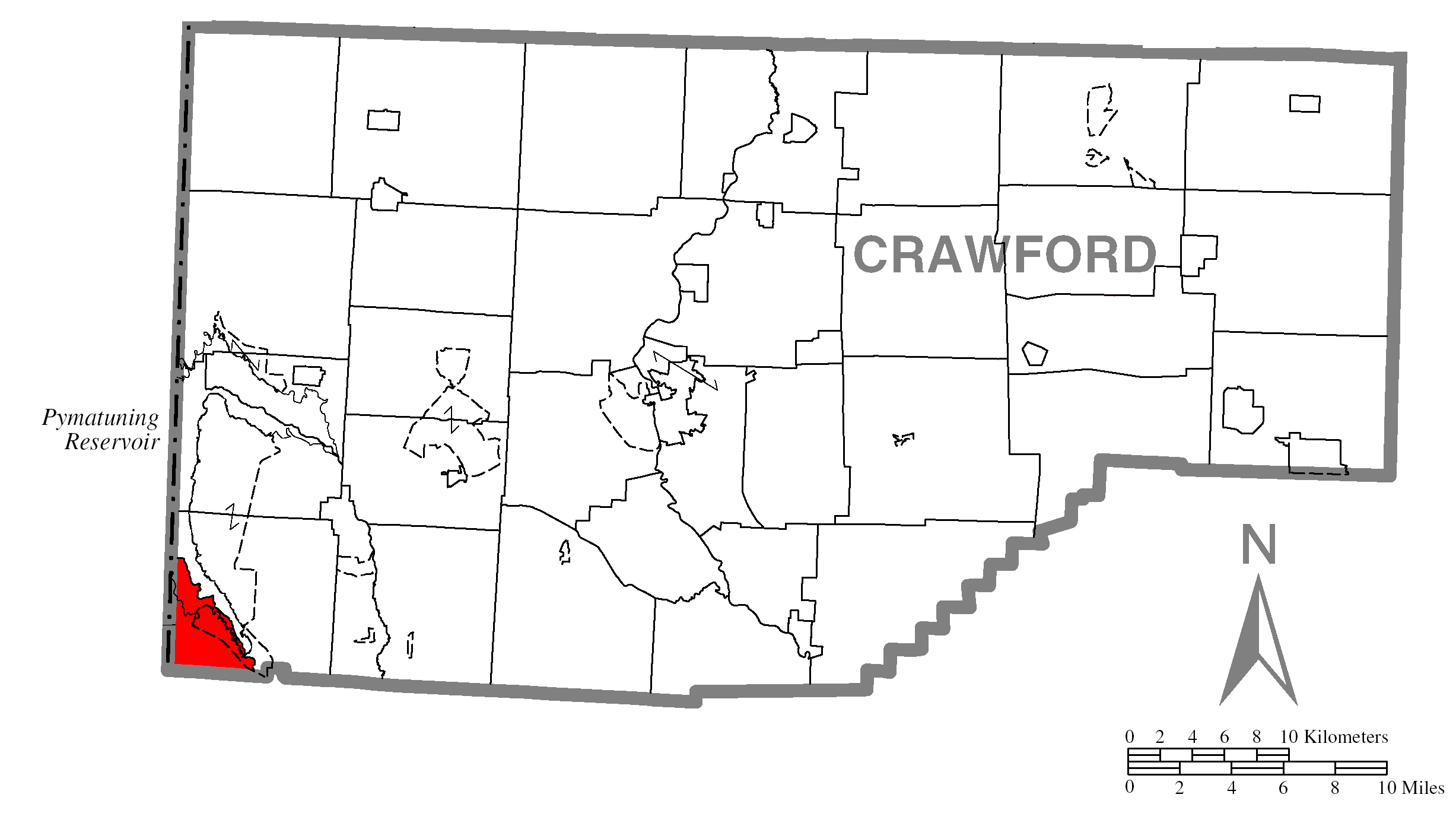
- Location of West Shenango Township in Crawford County

- Location of Crawford County in Pennsylvania
- Country: United States
- State: Pennsylvania
- County: Crawford

Area
  - Total: 9.00 sq mi (23.32 km^{2})
  - Land: 6.83 sq mi (17.68 km^{2})
  - Water: 2.18 sq mi (5.64 km^{2})
- Highest elevation (Ohio stateline): 1,140 ft (350 m)
- Lowest elevation (Shenango River): 970 ft (300 m)

Population (2020)
  - Total: 435 ▼
  - Estimate (2024): 424
  - Density: 72.1/sq mi (27.82/km^{2})
- Time zone: UTC-4 (EST)
  - Summer (DST): UTC-5 (EDT)
- FIPS code: 42-039-84008

West Shenango Township is a township in Crawford County, Pennsylvania, United States. The population was 435 at the 2020 census, down from 504 at the 2010 census.

== Geography ==
West Shenango Township occupies the southwestern corner of Crawford County, bordered by Mercer County to the south and by Ashtabula and Trumbull counties in Ohio to the west. The northeastern border of the township is within Pymatuning Reservoir and its outlet, the Shenango River.

The unincorporated community of Turnersville is in the northeastern part of the township, along Pymatuning Reservoir; Turnersville and neighboring residential communities make up part of the Pymatuning South census-designated place. Pymatuning State Park occupies the lakeshore.

According to the United States Census Bureau, the township has a total area of 9.0 square miles (23.3 km^{2}), of which 6.8 square miles (17.7 km^{2}) is land and 2.2 square miles (5.6 km^{2}), or 24.17%, is water.

== Demographics ==
Historical population
Census	Pop.	Note	%±
2000	541		—
2010	504		−6.8%
2020	435		−13.7%
2024 (est.)	424		−2.5%
U.S. Decennial Census

As of the census of 2000, there were 541 people, 221 households, and 152 families residing in the township. The population density was 79.5 inhabitants per square mile (30.7/km^{2}). There were 288 housing units at an average density of 42.3 per square mile (16.3/km^{2}). The racial makeup of the township was 99.63% White, and 0.37% from two or more races.

There were 221 households, out of which 29.4% had children under the age of 18 living with them, 58.4% were married couples living together, 5.9% had a female householder with no husband present, and 30.8% were non-families. 26.2% of all households were made up of individuals, and 11.8% had someone living alone who was 65 years of age or older. The average household size was 2.45 and the average family size was 2.95.

In the township the population was spread out, with 24.0% under the age of 18, 5.5% from 18 to 24, 27.5% from 25 to 44, 23.3% from 45 to 64, and 19.6% who were 65 years of age or older. The median age was 41 years. For every 100 females there were 89.2 males. For every 100 females age 18 and over, there were 92.1 males.

The median income for a household in the township was $34,250, and the median income for a family was $43,438. Males had a median income of $34,643 versus $19,250 for females. The per capita income for the township was $16,284. About 5.7% of families and 8.5% of the population were below the poverty line, including 13.4% of those under age 18 and 5.7% of those age 65 or over.
