= Pymatuning State Park (Ohio) =

Park in Ohio, USA

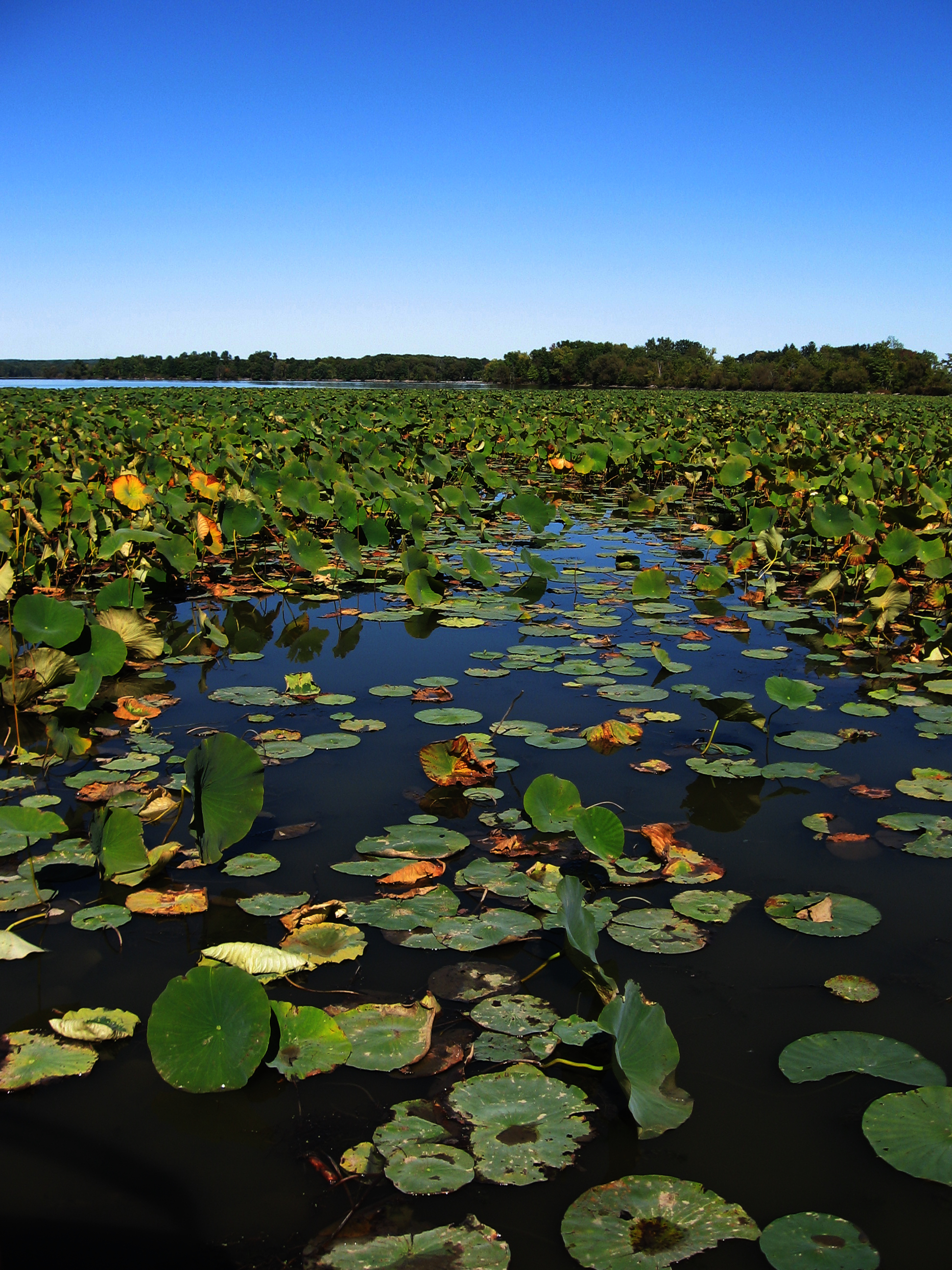
- Lily pads on Pymatuning Lake

- Location within Ohio Location within the United States
- Location: Ashtabula County, Ohio, United States
- Nearest city: Andover, Ohio
- Coordinates: 41°38′49″N 80°31′33″W
- Area: 3,512 acres (1,421 ha)
- Elevation: 1,004 feet (306 m)
- Established: 1950
- Administrator: Ohio Department of Natural Resources
- Designation: Ohio state park
- Website: Pymatuning State Park

Pymatuning State Park is a 3,512-acre (1,421 ha) Ohio state park near Andover, Ashtabula County, Ohio in the United States. Pymatuning State Park contains 1,407 acres (569 ha) of Pymatuning Lake, one-quarter of which is in Ohio and three-quarters of which is in Pennsylvania. The lake provides fishing and boating year-round.

Formed in the 1930s by a dam on the Shenango River, the lake features multiple beaches and camping areas in both states. The northeastern part of Pymatuning Lake, east of the spillway and 3 miles (4.8 km) south of Linesville, is a protected gameland where colonies of 20,000 Canada geese and many more ducks winter each year. The lake is the result of an earth dam 3 miles (4.8 km) north of Jamestown, Pennsylvania, whose outflow forms the Shenango River. A 3-mile (4.8 km) causeway extends between Pennsylvania and Ohio near the center of the lake.

== History ==
=== Native Americans ===
Pymatuning State Park is on land that was once a very large swamp. The first known inhabitants were the Mound Builders. Two of their mounds were flooded over by the creation of Pymatuning Lake. The Lenape were living in the area when European settlers first came to the area. The lake is named for the chief, who lived in the area at the time, Pihmtomink. The Lenape were pushed out of the area by the Seneca tribe, a member of the larger Iroquois Confederacy. The Seneca were defeated by General Anthony Wayne's forces during the Northwest Indian War and left the area under the terms of the Treaty of Greenville. This treaty marked the end of the Native tribes' control of the area.

=== From swamplands to parklands ===
The earliest European visitors were trappers trading in beaver pelts, and lumbermen harvesting white pine trunks used as masts for sailing ships. After them came farmers, even though the land was very swampy and difficult to reclaim. Farm animals that wandered off were often lost in the quicksands of the swamp or fell prey to predators like foxes, bears and mountain lions. The swamps were infested with mosquitoes that brought yellow fever to the settlers.

Building a dam on the Shenango River was first explored in 1911. A massive flood in 1913 caused $3 million in damage and took several lives. The Pennsylvania General Assembly approved a budget of $1.2 million to build a dam across the Shenango, but Governor John K. Tener slashed the budget to $100,000. The legislature took action again in 1917, approving a $400,000 budget under the condition that the needed land in Ohio be purchased by the private sector. The Pymatuning Land Company was formed and raised the needed funds to purchase the needed Ohio properties. The land was finally acquired in full by 1931 when Governor Gifford Pinchot approved $1.5 million to complete the dam. 7,000 men began work on the dam in 1931 and the project was completed in 1934. The final cost of building the dam was $3,717,739 and the lake now holds 64,275,000,000 US gallons (2.4331×10^{11} L) of water, covering 17,088 acres (69.15 km^{2}) over a length of 17 miles (27 km) with a width of 1.6 miles (2.6 km) at the widest and 70 miles (110 km) of shoreline with a maximum depth of 35 feet (11 m).

== Activities ==
=== Fishing ===
Pymatuning Lake offers year-round fishing; it is a warm water fishery. A valid Ohio fishing license is required for anyone over 16 to fish from the Ohio shoreline, while a Pennsylvania license is required to fish from the Pennsylvania shoreline. Valid Ohio and Pennsylvania license holders are permitted to fish from a boat anywhere on Pymatuning lake, regardless of the state line. Easily accessible fishing can be reached from one of four boat launches on the Ohio shoreline. Commonly caught species include large and smallmouth bass, black bass, crappie, bluegill, perch, catfish, walleye, and muskellunge. In particular, Pymatuning lake is known for walleye fishing.
