= South Shenango Township, Pennsylvania =

Township in Pennsylvania, US

Coordinates: 41°33′00″N 80°30′59″W

South Shenango Township, Crawford County, Pennsylvania
- Township
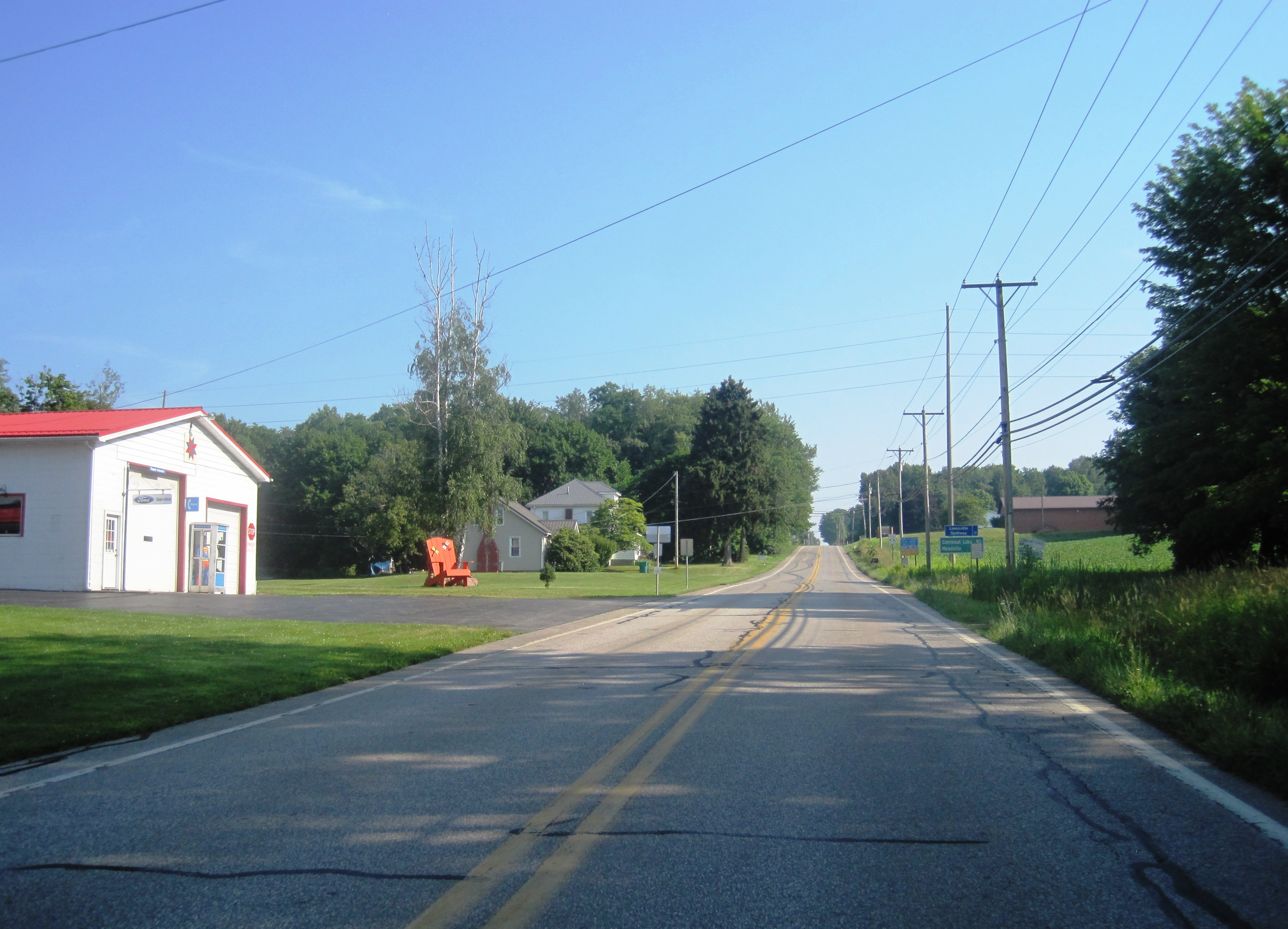
- US 322 eastbound entering South Shenango Township from Jamestown

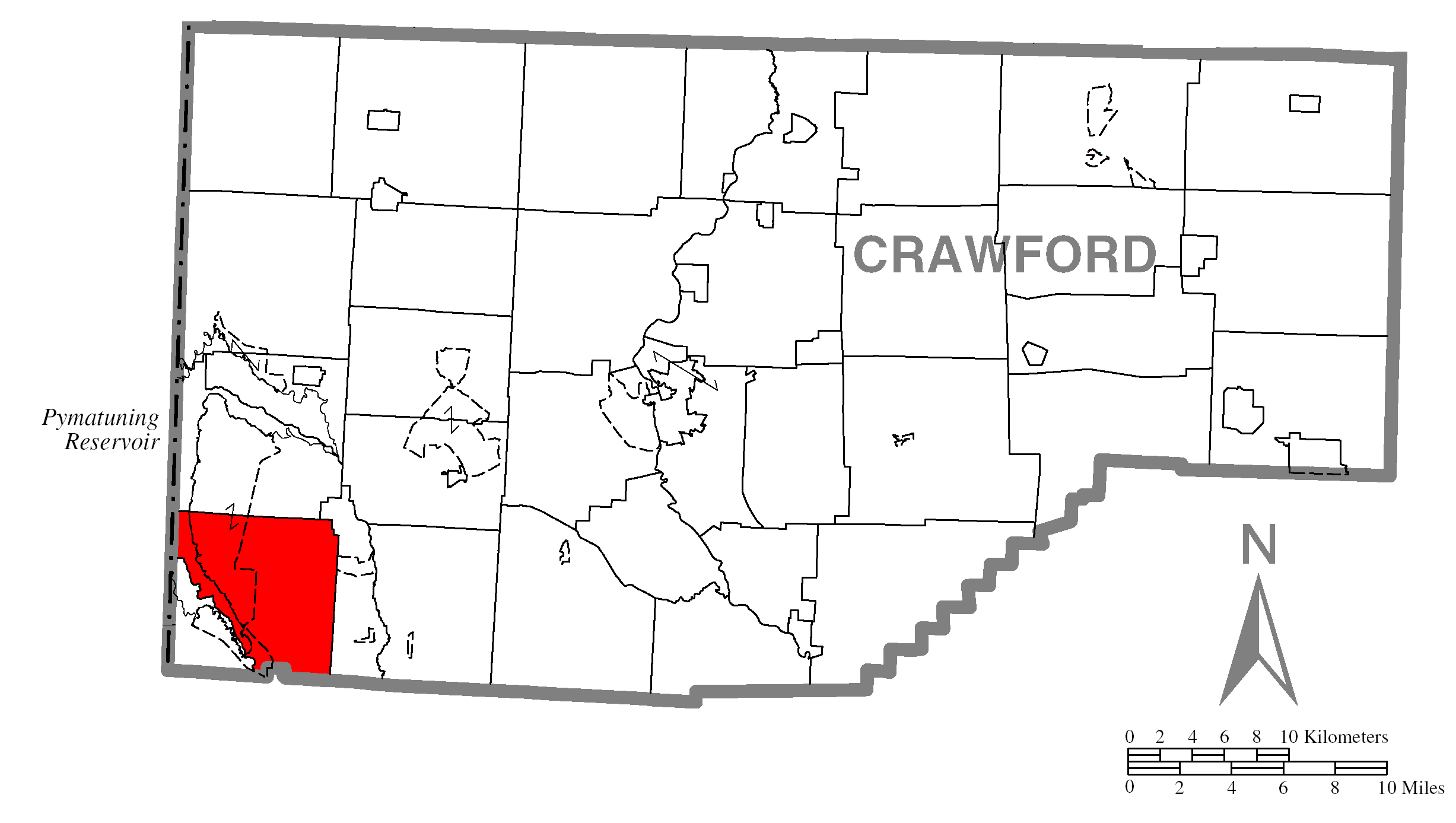
- Location of South Shenango Township in Crawford County

- Location of Crawford County in Pennsylvania
- Country: United States
- State: Pennsylvania
- County: Crawford County

Area
  - Total: 29.92 sq mi (77.50 km^{2})
  - Land: 26.56 sq mi (68.80 km^{2})
  - Water: 3.36 sq mi (8.69 km^{2})
- Highest elevation (southeast of Marshall Corners): 1,360 ft (410 m)
- Lowest elevation (Shenango River): 980 ft (300 m)

Population (2020)
  - Total: 1,832 ▼
  - Estimate (2024): 1,819
  - Density: 75.3/sq mi (29.08/km^{2})
- Time zone: UTC-4 (EST)
  - Summer (DST): UTC-5 (EDT)
- Area code: 814
- FIPS code: 42-039-72472
- Website: www.southshenangotwp.com

South Shenango Township is a township in Crawford County, Pennsylvania, United States. The population was 1,831 at the 2020 census, down from 2,037 at the 2010 census.

== Geography ==
The township is in southwestern Crawford County, bordered by Mercer County to the south, Pymatuning Reservoir and the Shenango River to the southwest, and Ashtabula County, Ohio, to the west. The borough of Jamestown is along the southern border but is a separate municipality and is entirely in Mercer County. The United States Census Bureau counts residential communities in the western part of the township, including the unincorporated community of Westford, as parts of the Pymatuning Central and Pymatuning South census-designated places.

According to the Census Bureau, the township has a total area of 29.9 square miles (77.5 km^{2}), of which 26.6 square miles (68.8 km^{2}) is land and 3.4 square miles (8.7 km^{2}), or 11.22%, is water. Pymatuning Reservoir, an impoundment at the head of the Shenango River, is one of the largest artificial bodies of water in the state. The Shenango River flows south to the Beaver River and thence to the Ohio River.

== Demographics ==
Historical population
Census	Pop.	Note	%±
2000	2,047		—
2010	2,037		−0.5%
2020	1,832		−10.1%
2024 (est.)	1,819		−0.7%
U.S. Decennial Census

As of the census of 2000, there were 2,047 people, 854 households, and 603 families residing in the township. The population density was 77.0 inhabitants per square mile (29.7/km^{2}). There were 1,709 housing units at an average density of 64.3 per square mile (24.8/km^{2}). The racial makeup of the township was 98.44% White, 0.15% African American, 0.34% Native American, 0.29% Asian, and 0.78% from two or more races. Hispanic or Latino of any race were 0.05% of the population.

There were 854 households, out of which 26.7% had children under the age of 18 living with them, 59.5% were married couples living together, 6.7% had a female householder with no husband present, and 29.3% were non-families. 24.6% of all households were made up of individuals, and 11.9% had someone living alone who was 65 years of age or older. The average household size was 2.40 and the average family size was 2.83.

In the township the population was spread out, with 21.9% under the age of 18, 5.2% from 18 to 24, 24.7% from 25 to 44, 28.4% from 45 to 64, and 19.8% who were 65 years of age or older. The median age was 44 years. For every 100 females, there were 97.8 males. For every 100 females age 18 and over, there were 97.0 males.

The median income for a household in the township was $31,875, and the median income for a family was $38,264. Males had a median income of $35,223 versus $22,188 for females. The per capita income for the township was $16,546. About 6.8% of families and 10.6% of the population were below the poverty line, including 15.2% of those under age 18 and 3.7% of those age 65 or over.
