= Pymatuning Reservoir =

Reservoir in Ohio and Pennsylvania, United States

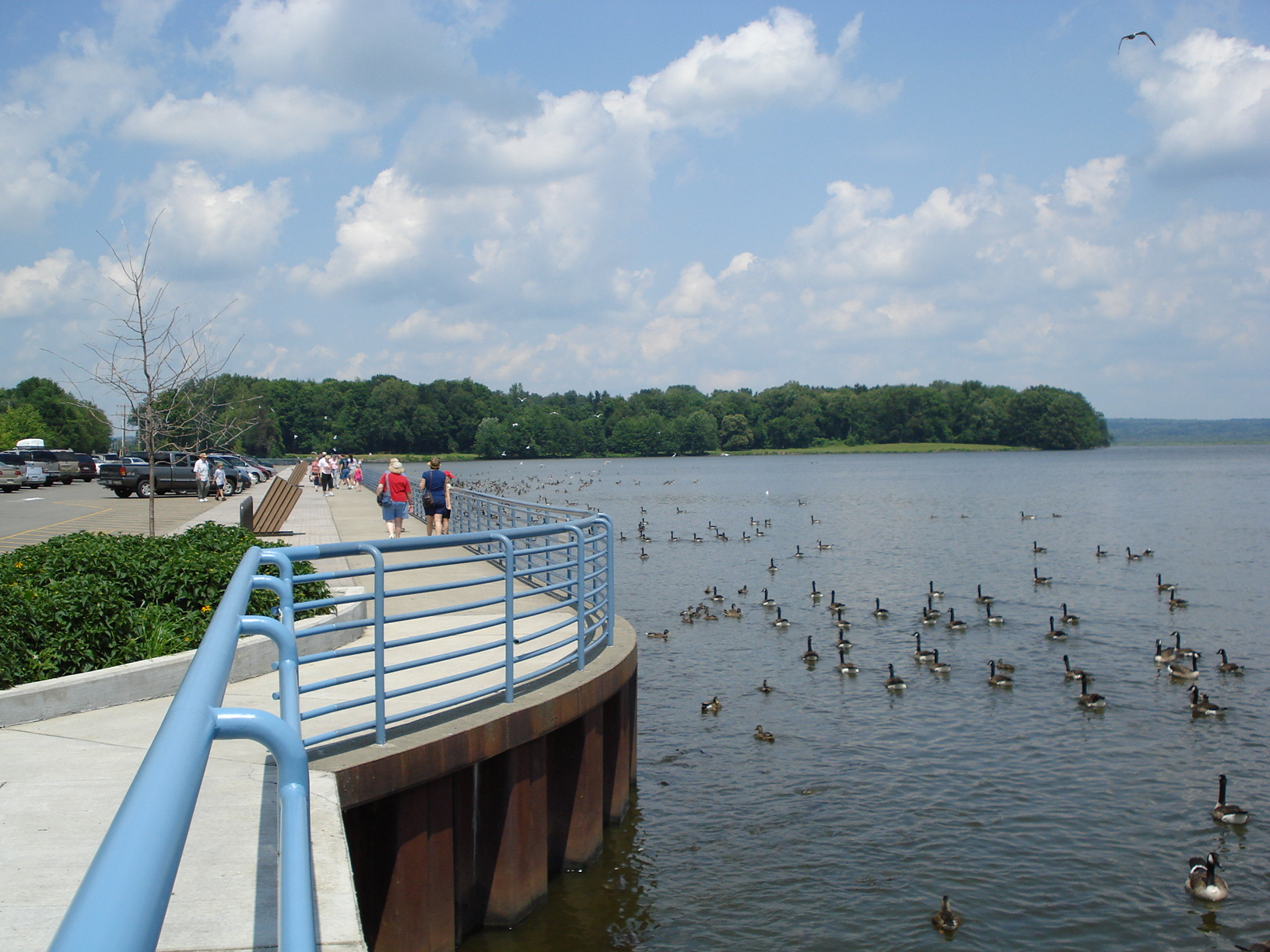
- Pymatuning Reservoir, seen from the Spillway, Linesville, PA

- Location within Ohio Location within Pennsylvania
- Location: Crawford County, Pennsylvania / Ashtabula County, Ohio, US
- Coordinates: 41°29′54″N 80°27′41″W
- Type: Reservoir
- Etymology: Pihmtomink (Indigenous Chief)
- Primary inflows: Shenango River
- Primary outflows: Shenango River
- Basin countries: United States
- Max. length: 17 mi (27 km)
- Max. width: 1.6 mi (2.6 km)
- Surface area: 17,088 acres (6,915 ha)
- Average depth: 15 ft (4.6 m)
- Max. depth: 35 ft (11 m)
- Water volume: 64,300,000,000 imp gal (0.292 km^{3})
- Shore length^{1}: 70 mi (110 km)
- Surface elevation: 1,001 ft (305 m)
- Islands: Ackerman, Clark, Ford, Glenn, Harris, Stockers, Whaley
- ^{1} Shore length is not a well-defined measure.

Pymatuning Reservoir is a man-made lake in Crawford County, Pennsylvania, and Ashtabula County, Ohio, in the United States, on land that was once a very large swamp. Much of it is incorporated into two state parks: Pymatuning State Park in Pennsylvania, and Pymatuning State Park in Ohio.

== History ==
The first known inhabitants were the Mound Builders. Two of their mounds were flooded by the creation of Pymatuning Lake. The Lenape were living in the area when European settlers first came there. The lake is named for the chief who lived in the area at the time, Pihmtomink. The Lenape were pushed out of the area by the Seneca tribe, a member of the Iroquois Confederacy. The Seneca were defeated by General Anthony Wayne's forces during the Northwest Indian War, and left the area under the terms of the Treaty of Greenville. This treaty marked the end of Native Americans inhabiting the area.

The first settlers to the area were farmers, whose lives were not easy, as the land was very swampy and very difficult to reclaim. Farm animals that wandered off were often lost in the quicksands of the swamp, or fell prey to predators, such as foxes, bears, and mountain lions. The swamps were infested with mosquitoes that brought yellow fever to the settlers.

An unsolved murder case is associated with the then Pymatuning Swamp. In 1932, herpetologist Norman Edouard Hartweg, while searching for reptiles, ran into a body of a lady. The police concluded that she had been murdered elsewhere, but her identity was never confirmed, nor the murderer identified.

== Dam and lake ==
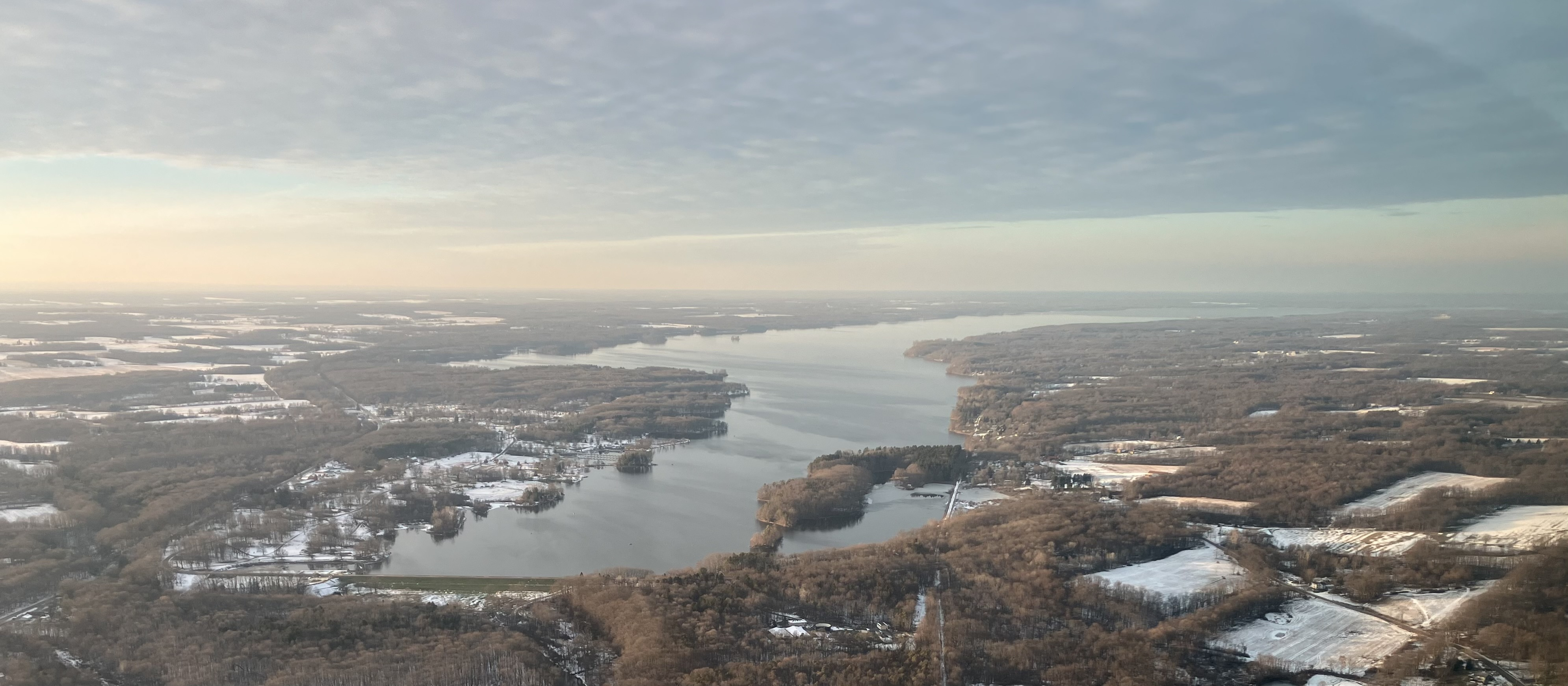
Aerial image from 2000 ft above the ground: The dam can be seen on this side of the reservoir.

Building a dam on the Shenango River was first explored in 1911. A massive flood in 1913 caused $3 million in damage and took several lives. The Pennsylvania General Assembly approved a budget of $1.2 million to build at dam across the Shenango, but Governor John K. Tener slashed the budget to just $100,000.

The Pennsylvania legislature took action again in 1917, this time approving a $400,000 budget under the condition that the needed land in Ohio be purchased by the private sector. The Pymatuning Land Company was formed and raised the funds to purchase the needed Ohio properties. The land was finally acquired in full by 1931, when Governor Gifford Pinchot approved $1.5 million to complete the dam. About 7,000 men began work on the dam in 1931, and the project was completed in 1934, with a final total cost of $3,717,739. The lake now holds 64.3 billion US gallons (243,000,000 m^{3}) of water, covering 17,088 acres (69.15 km^{2}) over a length of 17 miles (27 km) with a width of 1.6 miles (2.6 km) at the widest and 70 miles (110 km) of shoreline, with a maximum depth of 35 feet (11 m). The lake has served to provide a water supply for the Shenango and Beaver Valleys, it has lessened the damage caused by floods, and provided recreation for the people of Ohio and Pennsylvania. Two state parks, each named "Pymatuning State Park", are on the lake in Ohio and Pennsylvania.

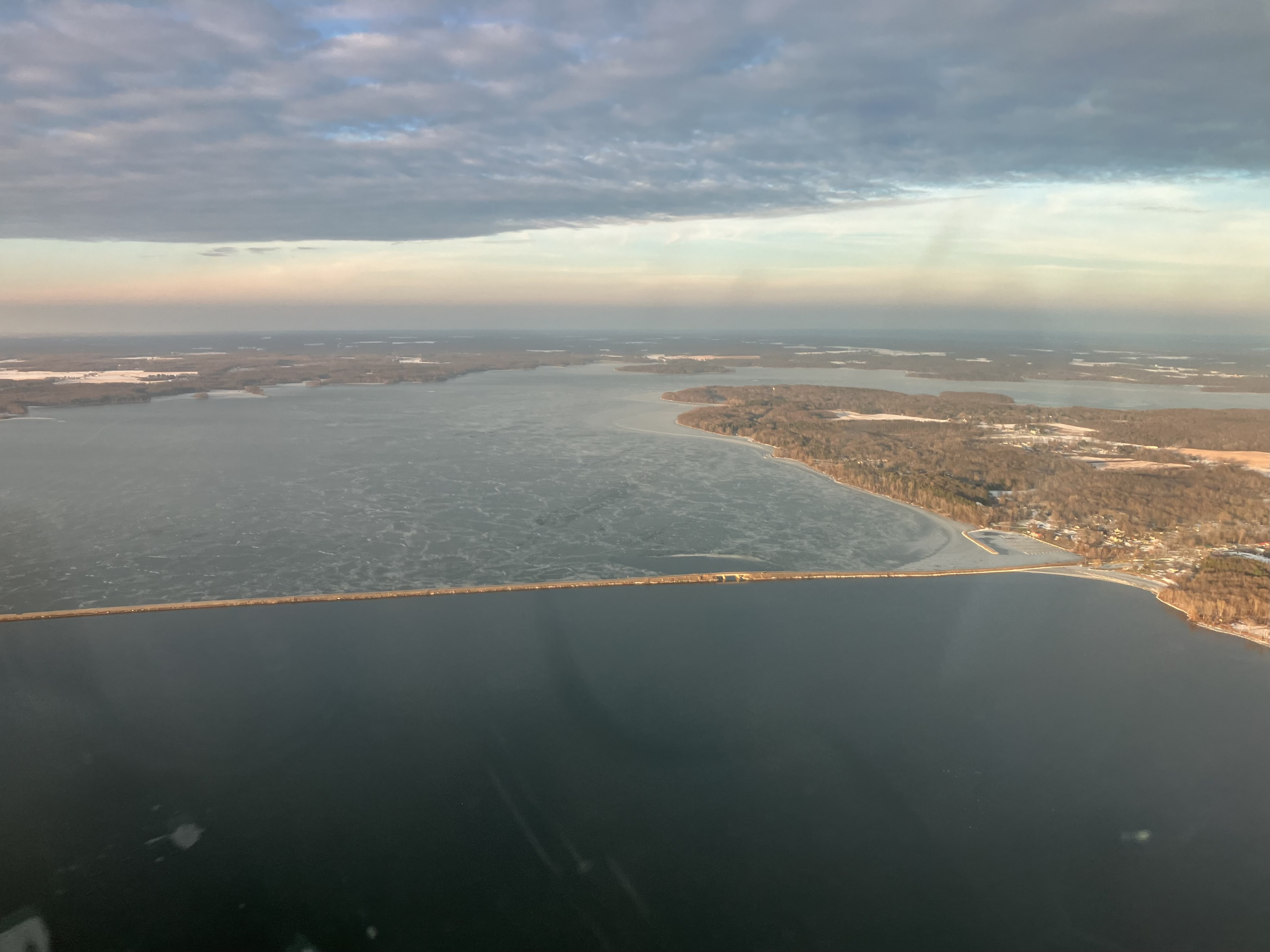
Causeway on the reservoir

A scenic two-mile-long causeway bridge spans the middle of the lake, connecting the towns of Espyville on the Pennsylvania side of the lake and Andover on the Ohio side. The bridge is crowned in the middle, with tall pillars and broad ducts underneath to allow lakewater to flow freely across the reservoir, and to permit the passage of sailboats and other pleasure craft travelling from one side of the lake to the other. The bridge is also equipped with small concrete and earthen pull-offs large enough for several vehicles apiece, with concrete staircases and walkways below the parking spaces to allow travelers to stroll down and fish or sightsee beside the bridge.

The Pennsylvania portion also has a spillway separating the (higher) upstream-most portion of the lake from the rest. A parking area along the spillway serves a popular warm-weather attraction commonly known as "where the ducks walk on the fish" because visitors throw bread to the thousands of carp and Canada geese that congregate there.

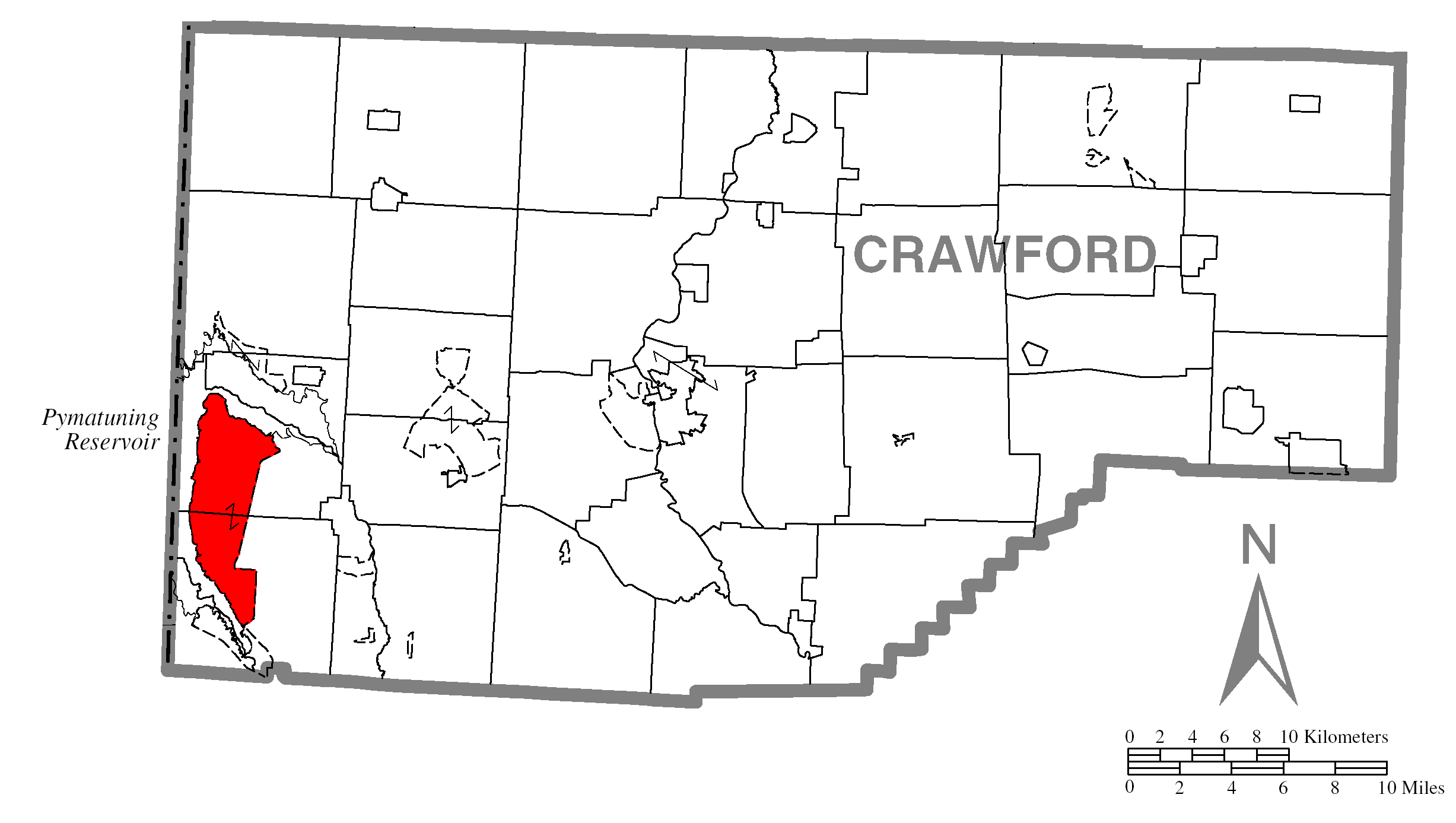
Pymatuning Central, a census-designated place adjacent to Pymatuning Reservoir in Crawford County, Pennsylvania
