= Conneaut School District =

School district in Pennsylvania

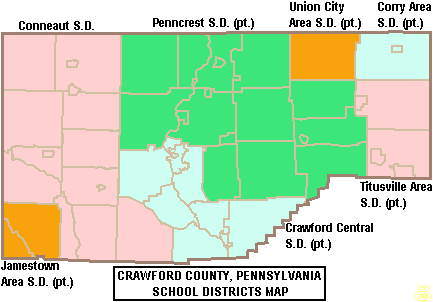

Address
- 219 West School Drive Linesville, Crawford, Pennsylvania, 16424; United States

Other information
- Website: conneautsd.org

The Conneaut School District is a public school district in Crawford County, Pennsylvania and geographically encompasses approximately the western third of the county. The school district is approximately 8 miles west of Meadville, 40 miles (64 km) south of Erie and 91 miles (146 km) north of Pittsburgh. Comprising a total area of approximately 381 square miles (990 km^{2}), the school district is bordered on the south by Mercer County, on the west by the state of Ohio, on the north by Erie County and on the east by the city of Meadville. The school district comprises the Boroughs of Conneaut Lake, Conneautville, Linesville and Springboro; and the Townships of Beaver, Conneaut, East Fallowfield, Greenwood, North Shenango, Pine, Sadsbury, Spring, Summerhill, Summit and West Fallowfield. The school district can be classified as rural with the majority of the work force employed in area contiguous to that of the school district.

== Attendance areas ==
The Conneaut School District comprises three separate attendance areas: Linesville, Conneaut Lake and Conneaut Valley. Each attendance area represents a small diverse community. Linesville is a small community located near the Pennsylvania and Ohio state line. It is a close-knit community. Many tourist visit Linesville because of the town's proximity to Pymatuning Lake. Conneaut Lake is a resort town on the shores of Conneaut Lake. Tourism flourishes here particularly during summer months. Conneaut Valley represents the community of Conneautville and Springboro, small towns in the north-central part of the school district. The Conneaut Valley community is also centered in a predominantly agricultural area of Crawford County.

== Schools ==
In 2012, the Conneaut School District's board of education voted to reconfigure its school buildings and realign its attendance areas in order to cut costs and more efficiently serve its students. The board voted to have 2 elementary schools, 2 middle schools and one senior high school to serve the district. Prior to reconfiguration, the district had 3 elementary schools and 3 junior-senior high schools. All of the district's buildings will be used in the reconfiguration.

An administration building, located on the Linesville campus, houses the district's central office staff. The six schools and the administration building have been extensively renovated since 2000.

=== Elementary schools ===
School name	Grades	School Address	Mascot	Colors
Conneaut Lake Elementary School	K-4	630 Line St; Conneaut Lake, PA 16316	Eagle	Black, Royal Blue and Silver
Conneaut Valley Elementary School	K-4	22361 State Highway 18; Conneautville, PA 16406	Eagle	Black, Royal Blue and Silver

=== Middle schools ===
School name	Grades	School Address	Mascot	Colors
Conneaut Lake Middle School	5-8	10331 US Highway 6 Conneaut Lake, PA 16316	Eagle	Black, Royal Blue, Silver
Conneaut Valley Middle School	5-8	22154 State Highway 18; Conneautville, PA 16406	Eagle	Black, Royal Blue, Silver

Note: The Conneaut Lake Middle School and Conneaut Valley Middle School are located in the former buildings that used to house the former Conneaut Lake High School and Conneaut Valley High School, respectively.

=== Senior High School ===
School name	Grades	School Address	Mascot	Colors
Conneaut Area Senior High School	9-12	302 West School Drive; Linesville, PA 16424	Eagle	Black, Royal Blue and Silver

Note: The Conneaut Area Senior High School is located in the former buildings that used to house the former Linesville High School and Alice Shafer Elementary School (now Alice L. Schafer Annex) located on the same campus in Linesville, PA.

== Extracurriculars ==
Conneaut School District offers a variety of clubs, activities and sports programs.

=== Sports ===
The district sponsors the following high school sports as of PIAA District 10.

Boys:
- Baseball (AAAA)
- Basketball (AAAA)
- Cross Country (AA)
- Football (AAA)
- Golf (AA)
- Lacrosse (AA)
- Soccer (AA)
- Volleyball (AA)
- Wrestling (AA)
Girls:
- Basketball (AAAA)
- Cross Country (AA)
- Golf (AA)
- Lacrosse (AA)
- Soccer (AA)
- Softball (AAAA)
- Volleyball (AAA)

The district sponsors the following middle school sports.

Boys
- Basketball
- Cross Country
- Football
- Volleyball
- Wrestling
Girls
- Basketball
- Cross Country
- Volleyball
