= Conneaut Area Senior High School =

Coordinates: 41.65436°N 80.41653°W

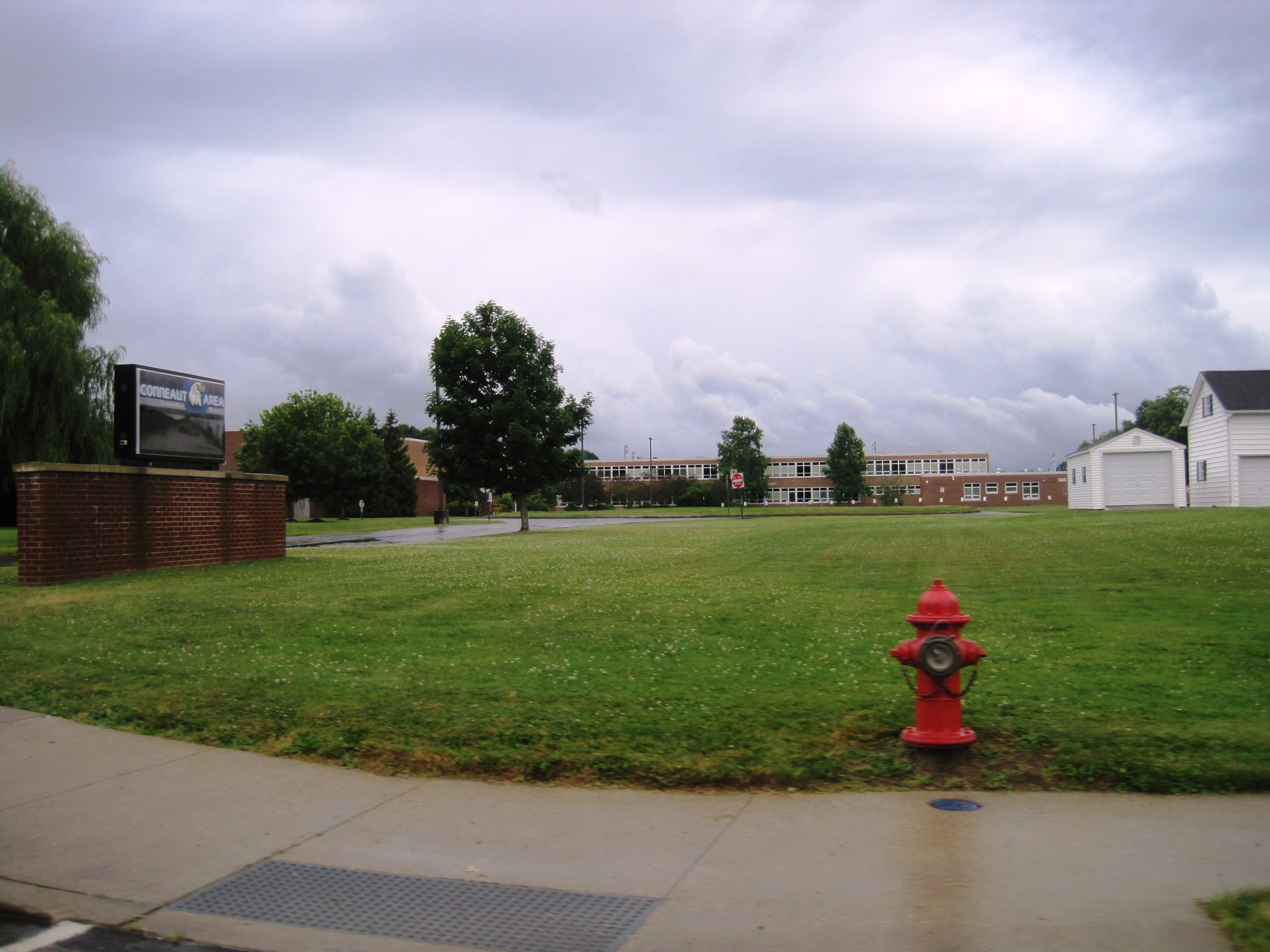
- Linesville, Crawford County, Pennsylvania 16424

Information
- Type: Public
- Established: 2012
- School district: Conneaut School District
- Superintendent: Jarrin Sperry
- Principal: Edward Pietroski (2021-present) Matt Vannoy (2022-present)
- Teaching staff: 43.14 (FTE)
- Enrollment: 563 (2023–2024)
- Student to teacher ratio: 13.05
- Colors: Black, royal blue, and silver
- Mascot: Eagles
- Team name: Eagles
- Website: https://cash.conneautsd.org/

Conneaut Area Senior High School, known locally as "CASH", is a public high school which is located within the borough of Linesville, Pennsylvania, USA. Situated at 302 West School Drive, the high school serves the Boroughs of Conneaut Lake, Conneautville, Linesville and Springboro; and the Townships of Beaver, Conneaut, East Fallowfield, Greenwood, North Shenango, Pine, Sadsbury, Spring, Summerhill, Summit and West Fallowfield.

It is the only high school for students in grades nine through twelve in the Conneaut School District. According to the National Center for Education Statistics, in 2019, the school reported an enrollment of 635 pupils in grades nine through twelve. The school employed forty-six teachers, yielding a student-teacher ratio of 14:1.

== History ==
Conneaut Area Senior High School was founded in 2012 after a merger and realignment was approved by the district's Board of Education to save expenses and better manage district funds. This resulted in a merger of the now former Conneaut Lake High School in Conneaut Lake, Conneaut Valley High School in Conneautville, and Linesville High School in Linesville.

The school is currently housed in the former Linesville High School and Alice L. Shafer Elementary School (now the Alice Shafer Annex); both are located on a joint campus in Linesville. The school name, mascot, and colors were chosen by the student body at the time and approved by the Board.

== Extracurriculars ==
Conneaut Area Senior High School offers a variety of clubs, activities and sports programs.

=== Sports ===
The high school sponsors the following sports as a member of PIAA District 10.

Boys:
- Baseball (AAAA)
- Basketball (AAAA)
- Cross Country (AA)
- Football (AAA)
- Golf (AA)
- Lacrosse (AA)
- Soccer (AA)
- Volleyball (AA)
- Wrestling (AA)
Girls:
- Basketball (AAAA)
- Cross Country (AA)
- Golf (AA)
- Lacrosse (AA)
- Soccer (AA)
- Softball (AAAA)
- Volleyball (AAA)
