= Conneaut =

Conneaut may refer to:

- Conneaut Creek, which flows through northwestern Pennsylvania and northeastern Ohio to Lake Erie
- Conneaut Lake, a natural lake in Crawford County, Pennsylvania, which drains south through the Conneaut Marsh
- Conneaut, Ohio, a city
- Conneaut Lake, Pennsylvania, a borough
- Conneaut Lakeshore, Pennsylvania, a census-designated place
- Conneautville, Pennsylvania, a borough
- Conneaut Township, Crawford County, Pennsylvania
- Conneaut Township, Erie County, Pennsylvania
