= Pennsylvania Route 618 =

State highway in Crawford County, Pennsylvania, US

Pennsylvania Route 618

Route information
- Maintained by PennDOT
- Length: 3.25 mi (5.23 km)
- Existed: 1928–present
- Tourist routes: Crawford Lakelands Scenic Byway

Major junctions
- South end: US 6 in Sadsbury Township
- North end: PA 18 in Summit Township

Location
- Country: United States
- State: Pennsylvania
- Counties: Crawford

Highway system
- Pennsylvania State Route System; Interstate; US; State; Scenic; Legislative
← PA 616	→ US 622

Pennsylvania Route 618 (PA 618) is a 3.25-mile-long (5.23 km) state highway located in Crawford County, Pennsylvania. The southern terminus is at US 6 in Sadsbury Township. The northern terminus is at PA 18 in Summit Township.

== Route description ==
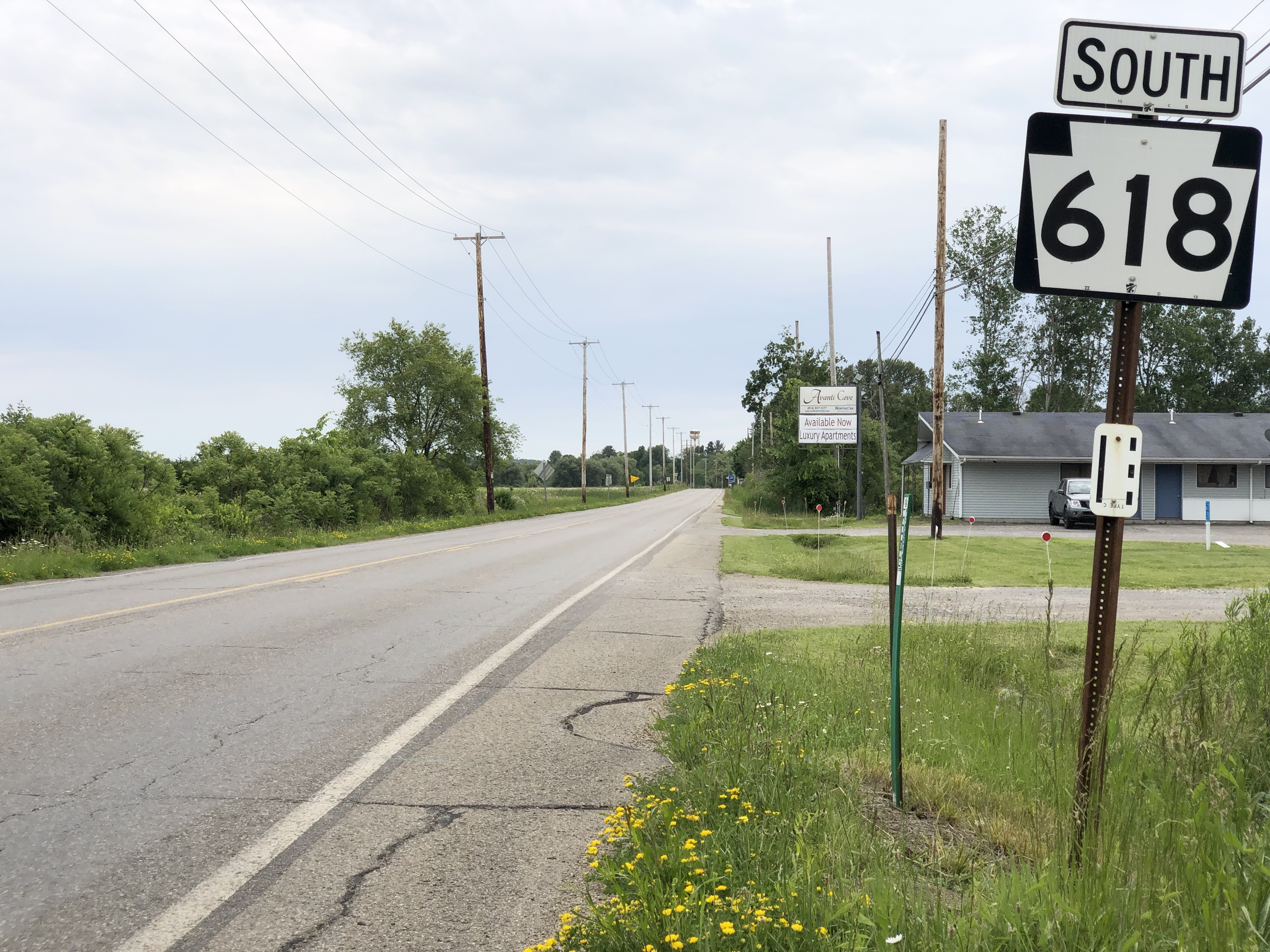
PA 618 southbound past PA 18 in Summit Township

PA 618 begins at an intersection with US 6 in Sadsbury Township, heading north on a two-lane undivided road through woodland. The road continues through more forests with a few homes before reaching the residential community of Conneaut Lake Park, where it curves northeast and crosses into Summit Township. After passing through Conneaut Lake Park, PA 618 runs between the Park Golf Course to the west and a field to the east before ending at PA 18.

== Major intersections ==
The entire route is in Crawford County.

Location	mi	km	Destinations	Notes
Sadsbury Township	0.00	0.00	US 6 (Grand Army of the Republic Highway) – Conneaut Lake, Linesville	Southern terminus
Summit Township	3.25	5.23	PA 18 (Lexington Avenue) – Harmonsburg, Albion	Northern terminus
1.000 mi = 1.609 km; 1.000 km = 0.621 mi
