= Conneaut Lakeshore, Pennsylvania =

Unincorporated community in Pennsylvania, US

- Census-designated place
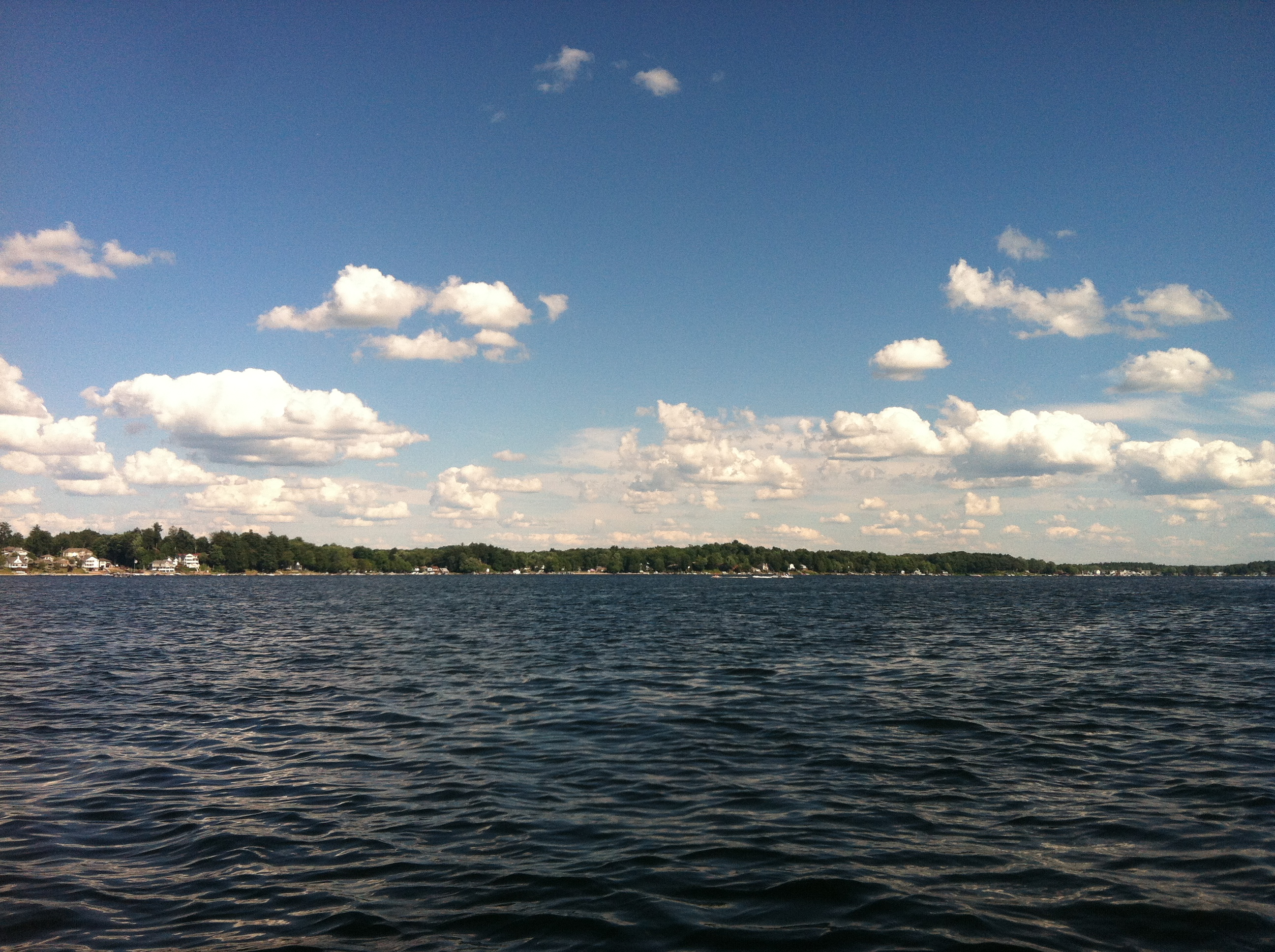
- View from the lake's northwest shore near the park, an area which is part of Conneaut Lakeshore

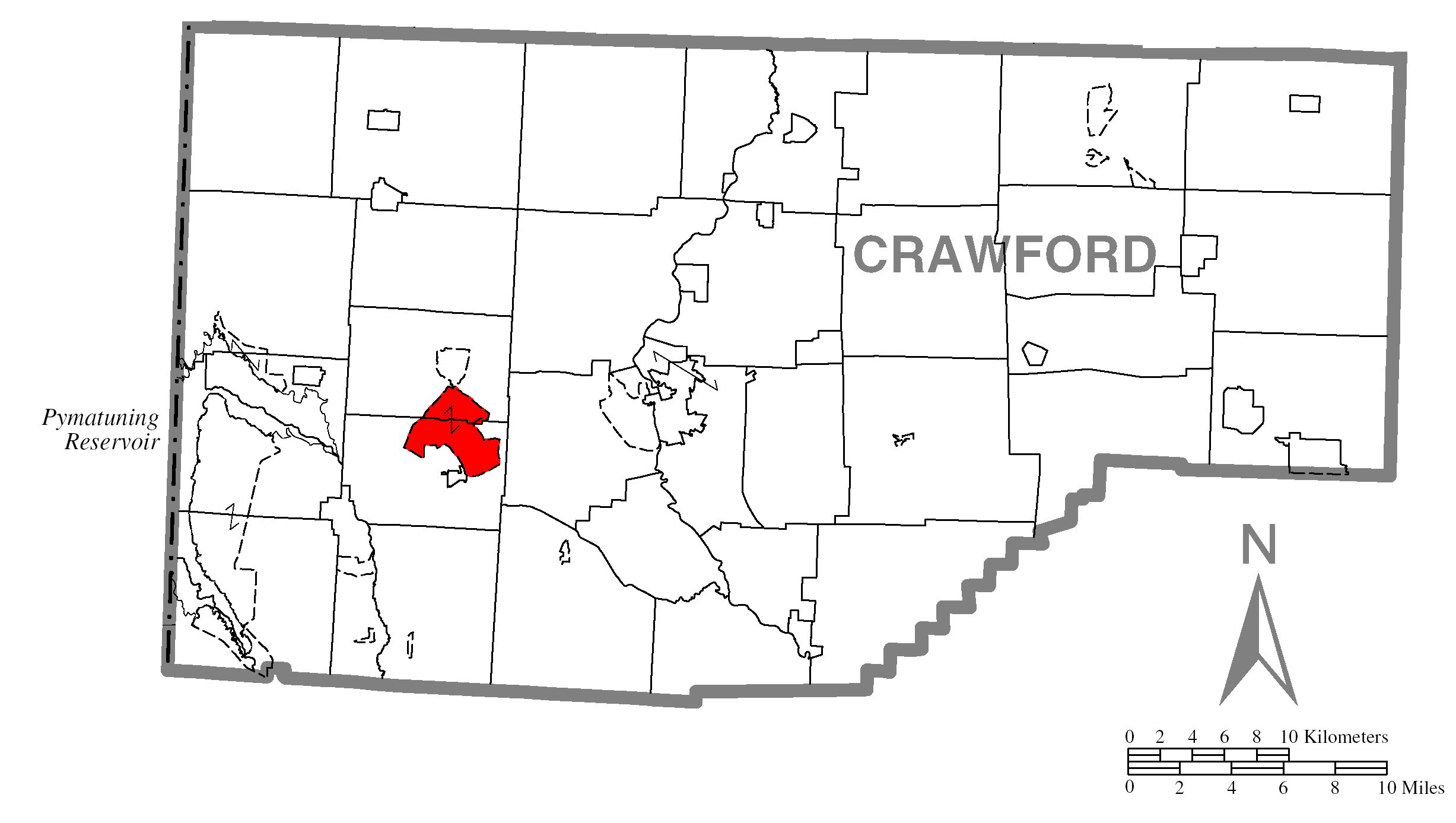
- Location of Conneaut Lakeshore in Crawford County

- Location of Crawford County in Pennsylvania
- Coordinates: 41°37′31″N 80°17′52″W
- Country: United States
- State: Pennsylvania
- County: Crawford County
- Townships: Sadsbury, Summit

Area
  - Total: 6.67 sq mi (17.28 km^{2})
  - Land: 5.19 sq mi (13.43 km^{2})
  - Water: 1.49 sq mi (3.85 km^{2})
- Elevation: 1,080 ft (330 m)

Population (2020)
  - Total: 2,307
  - Density: 444.9/sq mi (171.76/km^{2})
- Time zone: UTC-4 (EST)
  - Summer (DST): UTC-5 (EDT)
- ZIP code: 16316 (Conneaut Lake)
- Area code: 814
- FIPS code: 42-15755

Conneaut Lakeshore is a census-designated place (CDP) in Crawford County, Pennsylvania, United States. The population was 2,307 at the 2020 census, down from 2,395 at the 2010 census.

== Geography ==
The Conneaut Lakeshore CDP surrounds Conneaut Lake, the largest natural lake wholly in Pennsylvania. It is located in northwestern Pennsylvania at 41°37′31″N 80°17′52″W (41.625296, -80.297706), in western Crawford County. The CDP consists of all development around the lake except for the borough of Conneaut Lake at the southern end. Most of the CDP is in Sadsbury Township, with the northern end of the lake and CDP extending into Summit Township. Conneaut Lake Park, a resort area, is near the center of the CDP, on the western side of the lake. Harmonsburg is directly to the north.

U.S. Route 6 runs along parts of the southern edge of the CDP, leading northwest 12 miles (19 km) to the Ohio border and east with U.S. Route 322 9 miles (14 km) to Meadville, the Crawford County seat. Pennsylvania Route 18 runs through the CDP along the eastern side of the lake, leading north through Harmonsburg 11 miles (18 km) to Conneautville. Pennsylvania Route 618 runs west of the lake, passing through Conneaut Lake Park and connecting PA 18 and US 6.

According to the United States Census Bureau, the Conneaut Lakeshore CDP has a total area of 6.7 square miles (17.3 km^{2}), of which 5.2 square miles (13.4 km^{2}) is land and 1.5 square miles (3.9 km^{2}), or 22.29%, is water.

== Demographics ==
Historical population
Census	Pop.	Note	%±
2000	2,502		—
2010	2,395		−4.3%
2020	2,307		−3.7%
U.S. Decennial Census

As of the census of 2000, there were 2,502 people, 1,129 households, and 721 families residing in the CDP. The population density was 481.1 inhabitants per square mile (185.8/km^{2}). There were 2,325 housing units at an average density of 447.0 per square mile (172.6/km^{2}). The racial makeup of the CDP was 99.24% White, 0.08% African American, 0.12% Asian, and 0.56% from two or more races. Hispanic or Latino of any race were 0.36% of the population.

There were 1,129 households, out of which 23.4% had children under the age of 18 living with them, 53.6% were married couples living together, 8.0% had a female householder with no husband present, and 36.1% were non-families. 29.6% of all households were made up of individuals, and 12.1% had someone living alone who was 65 years of age or older. The average household size was 2.22 and the average family size was 2.72.

In the CDP, the population was spread out, with 19.7% under the age of 18, 6.3% from 18 to 24, 25.8% from 25 to 44, 30.0% from 45 to 64, and 18.2% who were 65 years of age or older. The median age was 44 years. For every 100 females, there were 98.4 males. For every 100 females age 18 and over, there were 98.9 males.

The median income for a household in the CDP was $37,991, and the median income for a family was $42,540. Males had a median income of $38,155 versus $22,546 for females. The per capita income for the CDP was $21,386. About 5.8% of families and 8.1% of the population were below the poverty line, including 12.3% of those under age 18 and 3.5% of those age 65 or over.
