= Summit Township, Pennsylvania =

Summit Township is the name of some places in the U.S. state of Pennsylvania:

- Summit Township, Butler County, Pennsylvania
- Summit Township, Crawford County, Pennsylvania
- Summit Township, Erie County, Pennsylvania
- Summit Township, Potter County, Pennsylvania
- Summit Township, Somerset County, Pennsylvania
