= Sadsbury Township, Pennsylvania =

Sadsbury Township is the name of some places in the U.S. state of Pennsylvania:

- Sadsbury Township, Chester County, Pennsylvania
- Sadsbury Township, Crawford County, Pennsylvania
- Sadsbury Township, Lancaster County, Pennsylvania
