= Conneaut Township, Pennsylvania =

Conneaut Township is the name of some places in the U.S. state of Pennsylvania:

- Conneaut Township, Crawford County, Pennsylvania
- Conneaut Township, Erie County, Pennsylvania
