= Harmonsburg, Pennsylvania =

Unincorporated community in Pennsylvania, US

- Census-designated place
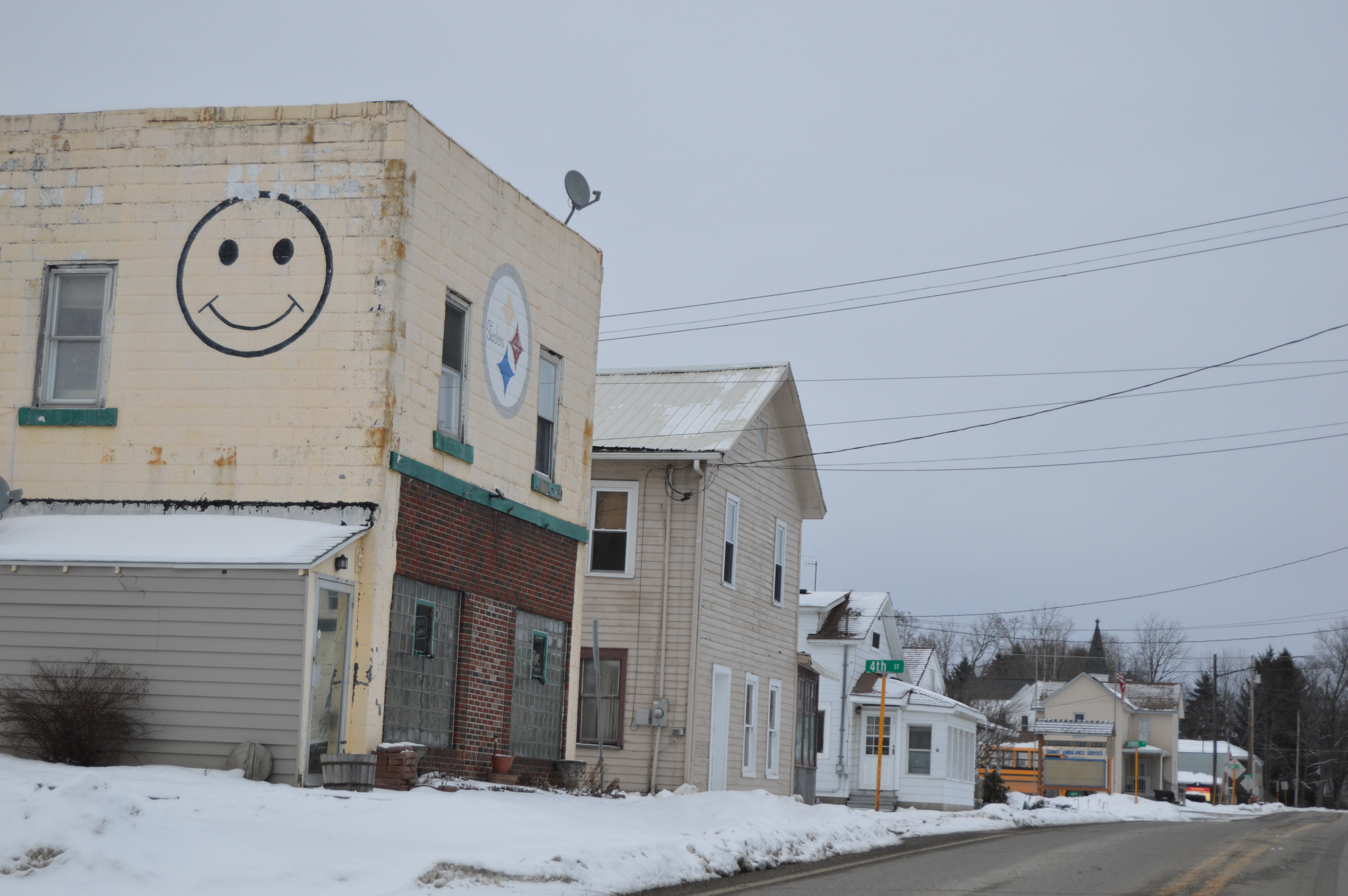
- Plum Street

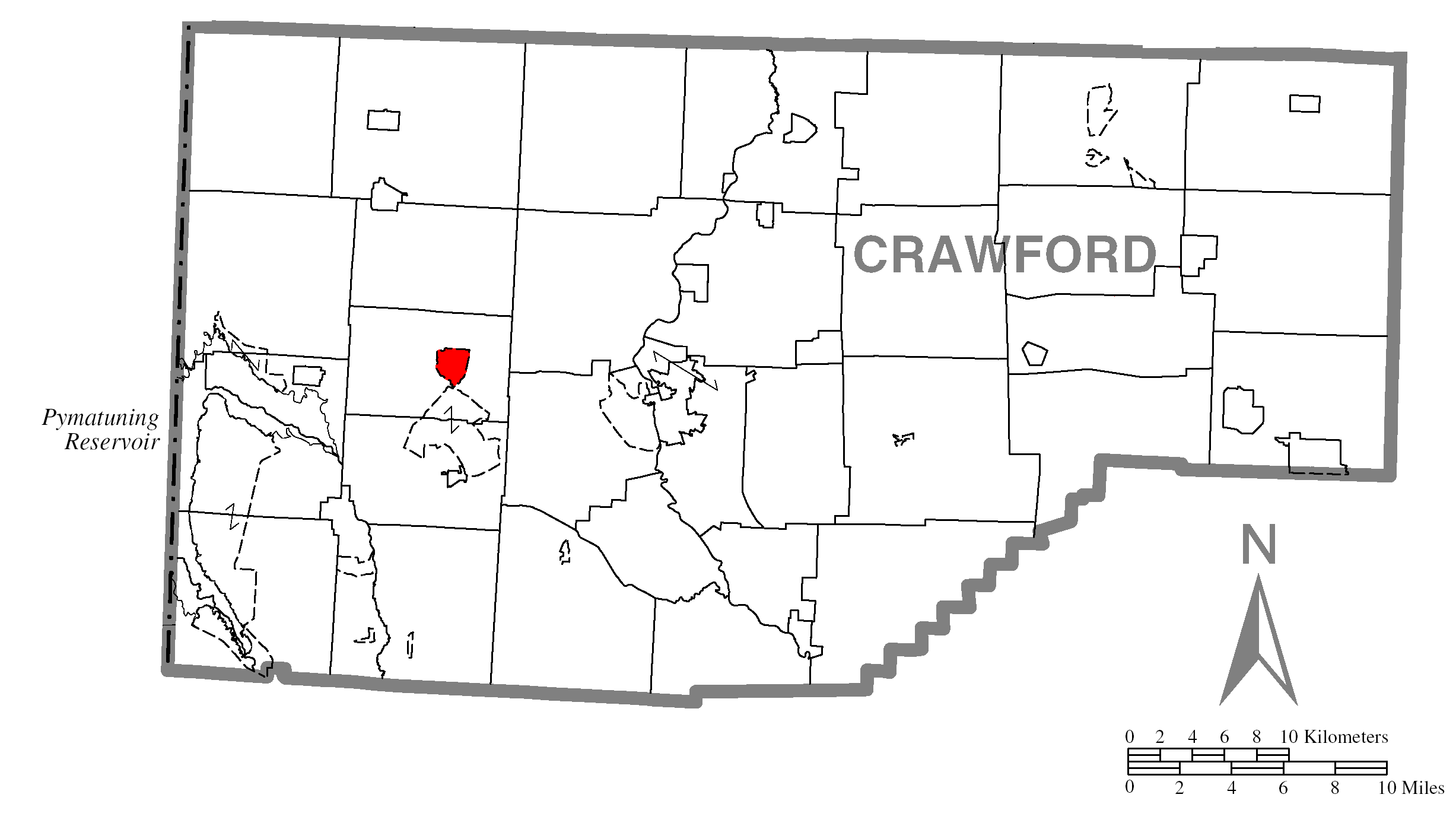
- Location of Harmonsburg in Crawford County

- Location of Crawford County in Pennsylvania
- Coordinates: 41°39′38.9442″N 80°19′3.7122″W
- Country: United States
- State: Pennsylvania
- County: Crawford County
- Township: Summit

Area
  - Total: 1.38 sq mi (3.57 km^{2})
  - Land: 1.38 sq mi (3.57 km^{2})
  - Water: 0 sq mi (0.00 km^{2})
- Elevation: 1,120 ft (340 m)

Population (2020)
  - Total: 309
  - Density: 224.5/sq mi (86.67/km^{2})
- Time zone: UTC-4 (EST)
  - Summer (DST): UTC-5 (EDT)
- ZIP code: 16422
- Area code: 814
- FIPS code: 42-32656

Harmonsburg is a census-designated place (CDP) in Crawford County, Pennsylvania, United States. The population was 401 at the 2010 census, up from 356 in 2000.

== History ==
Harmonsburg was laid out in 1816 by Henry Bright, a German Dunkard who laid out the village on land he had purchased in 1802. For many years, the village was known as "Brightstown". Bright was a blacksmith and farmer, and he lived in the village until his death in 1838. The first house was built by Joseph McMurtry and served as a tavern.

The village never grew to be very large, at most 160 or so inhabitants in the village proper. An early log grist and sawmill were located about a half a mile south of the village. A short distance east was a cheese factory.

== Geography ==
Harmonsburg is located in western Crawford County at 41°39′40″N 80°18′58″W (41.661068, -80.316181), slightly east of the center of Summit Township. It is less than 2 miles (3 km) north of Conneaut Lake. Pennsylvania Route 18 passes through the community, leading north 7 miles (11 km) to Conneautville and south 5 miles (8 km) to the borough of Conneaut Lake at the southern end of the lake.

Harmonsburg is surrounded by farms and farmland. The area is ideal for farming, being nearly level with access to water from Conneaut Inlet and Conneaut Creek. A great variety of timber—hemlock, sugar maple, pine, oak, sycamore, beech—are native here.

According to the United States Census Bureau, the CDP has a total area of 1.4 square miles (3.6 km^{2}), all land.

== Demographics ==
Historical population
Census	Pop.	Note	%±
2020	309		—
U.S. Decennial Census

As of the census of 2000, there were 356 people, 140 households, and 107 families residing in the CDP. The population density was 259.9 inhabitants per square mile (100.3/km^{2}). There were 157 housing units at an average density of 114.6 per square mile (44.2/km^{2}). The racial makeup of the CDP was 99.44% White and 0.56% Native American.

There were 140 households, out of which 34.3% had children under the age of 18 living with them, 62.9% were married couples living together, 9.3% had a female householder with no husband present, and 22.9% were non-families. 20.0% of all households were made up of individuals, and 7.9% had someone living alone who was 65 years of age or older. The average household size was 2.54 and the average family size was 2.88.

In the CDP the population was spread out, with 26.4% under the age of 18, 6.7% from 18 to 24, 29.5% from 25 to 44, 22.2% from 45 to 64, and 15.2% who were 65 years of age or older. The median age was 39 years. For every 100 females there were 108.2 males. For every 100 females age 18 and over, there were 107.9 males.

The median income for a household in the CDP was $32,679, and the median income for a family was $35,000. Males had a median income of $30,083 versus $25,313 for females. The per capita income for the CDP was $14,930. About 8.5% of families and 9.5% of the population were below the poverty line, including 13.4% of those under age 18 and 3.5% of those age 65 or over.
