= Pymatuning North, Pennsylvania =

Unincorporated community in Pennsylvania, US

Pymatuning North
- Census-designated place
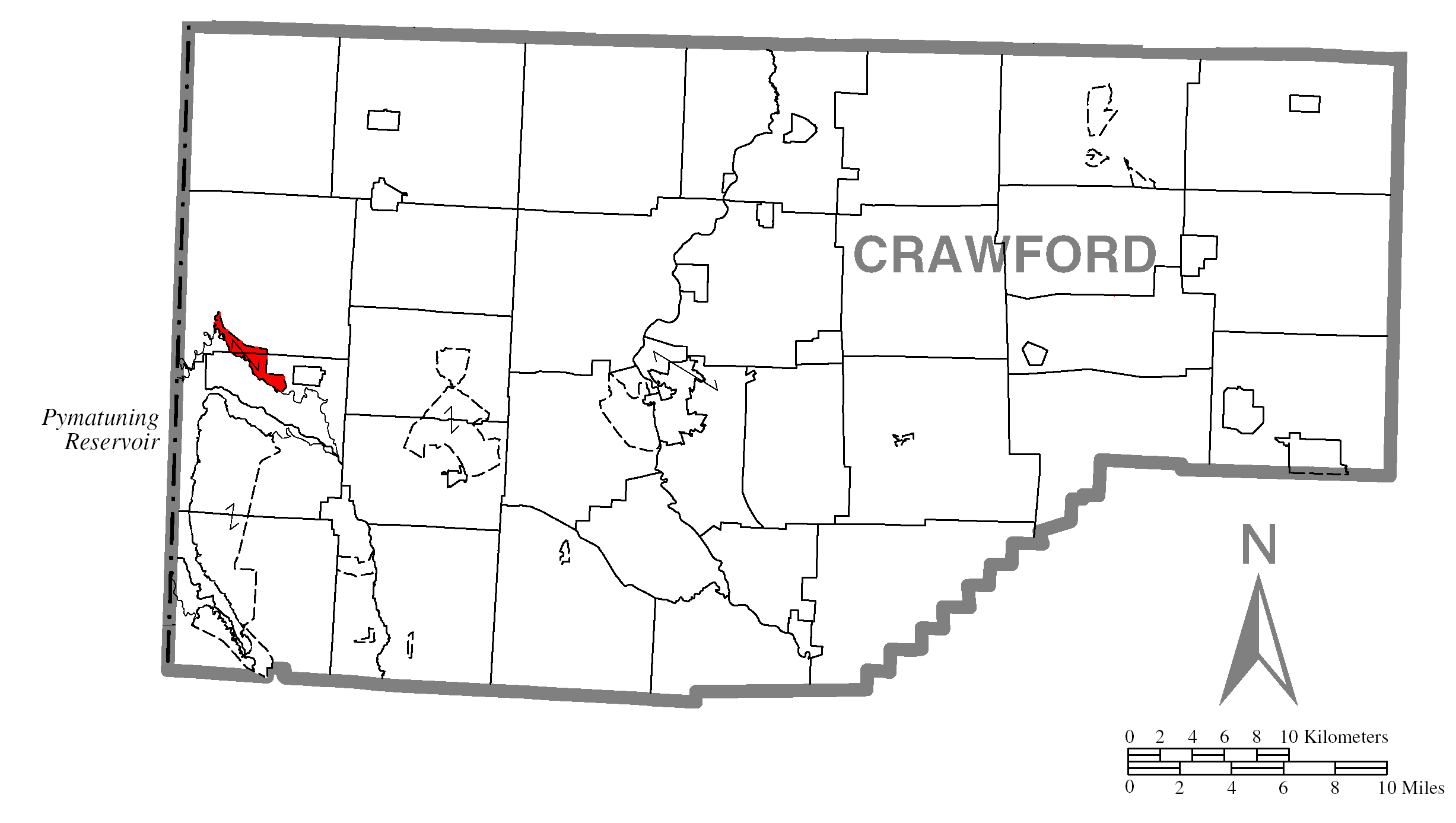
- Location of Pymatuning North in Crawford County

- Location of Crawford County in Pennsylvania
- Coordinates: 41°39′49″N 80°27′41″W
- Country: United States
- State: Pennsylvania
- County: Crawford
- Townships: Conneaut, Pine

Area
  - Total: 1.91 sq mi (4.94 km^{2})
  - Land: 1.90 sq mi (4.93 km^{2})
  - Water: 0.0039 sq mi (0.01 km^{2})
- Elevation: 1,060 ft (320 m)

Population (2020)
  - Total: 301
  - Density: 158.1/sq mi (61.06/km^{2})
- Time zone: UTC-4 (EST)
  - Summer (DST): UTC-5 (EDT)
- Area code: 814
- FIPS code: 42-63011

Pymatuning North is a census-designated place (CDP) in Crawford County, Pennsylvania, United States. The population was 311 at the 2010 census.

== Geography ==
Pymatuning North is located in western Crawford County at 41°39′49″N 80°27′41″W (41.663500, -80.461284), on the northeastern side of Pymatuning Reservoir, one of the largest reservoirs in Pennsylvania. It is in Conneaut and Pine townships.

According to the United States Census Bureau, the CDP has a total area of 1.9 square miles (4.9 km^{2}), all land.

== Demographics ==
Historical population
Census	Pop.	Note	%±
2020	301		—
U.S. Decennial Census

As of the census of 2000, there were 325 people, 147 households, and 100 families residing in the CDP. The population density was 171.2 inhabitants per square mile (66.1/km^{2}). There were 394 housing units at an average density of 207.5 per square mile (80.1/km^{2}). The racial makeup of the CDP was 98.46% White, 0.92% African American, and 0.62% from two or more races.

There were 147 households, out of which 21.1% had children under the age of 18 living with them, 60.5% were married couples living together, 6.8% had a female householder with no husband present, and 31.3% were non-families. 26.5% of all households were made up of individuals, and 10.9% had someone living alone who was 65 years of age or older. The average household size was 2.21 and the average family size was 2.64.

In the CDP, the population was spread out, with 18.5% under the age of 18, 3.1% from 18 to 24, 23.4% from 25 to 44, 31.1% from 45 to 64, and 24.0% who were 65 years of age or older. The median age was 49 years. For every 100 females, there were 109.7 males. For every 100 females age 18 and over, there were 110.3 males.

The median income for a household in the CDP was $26,875, and the median income for a family was $30,000. Males had a median income of $38,929 versus $20,000 for females. The per capita income for the CDP was $16,282. About 5.1% of families and 10.5% of the population were below the poverty line, including 22.0% of those under age 18 and 7.2% of those age 65 or over.
