= Pine Township, Crawford County, Pennsylvania =

Township in Pennsylvania, US

Coordinates: 41°39′00″N 80°27′59″W

- Township
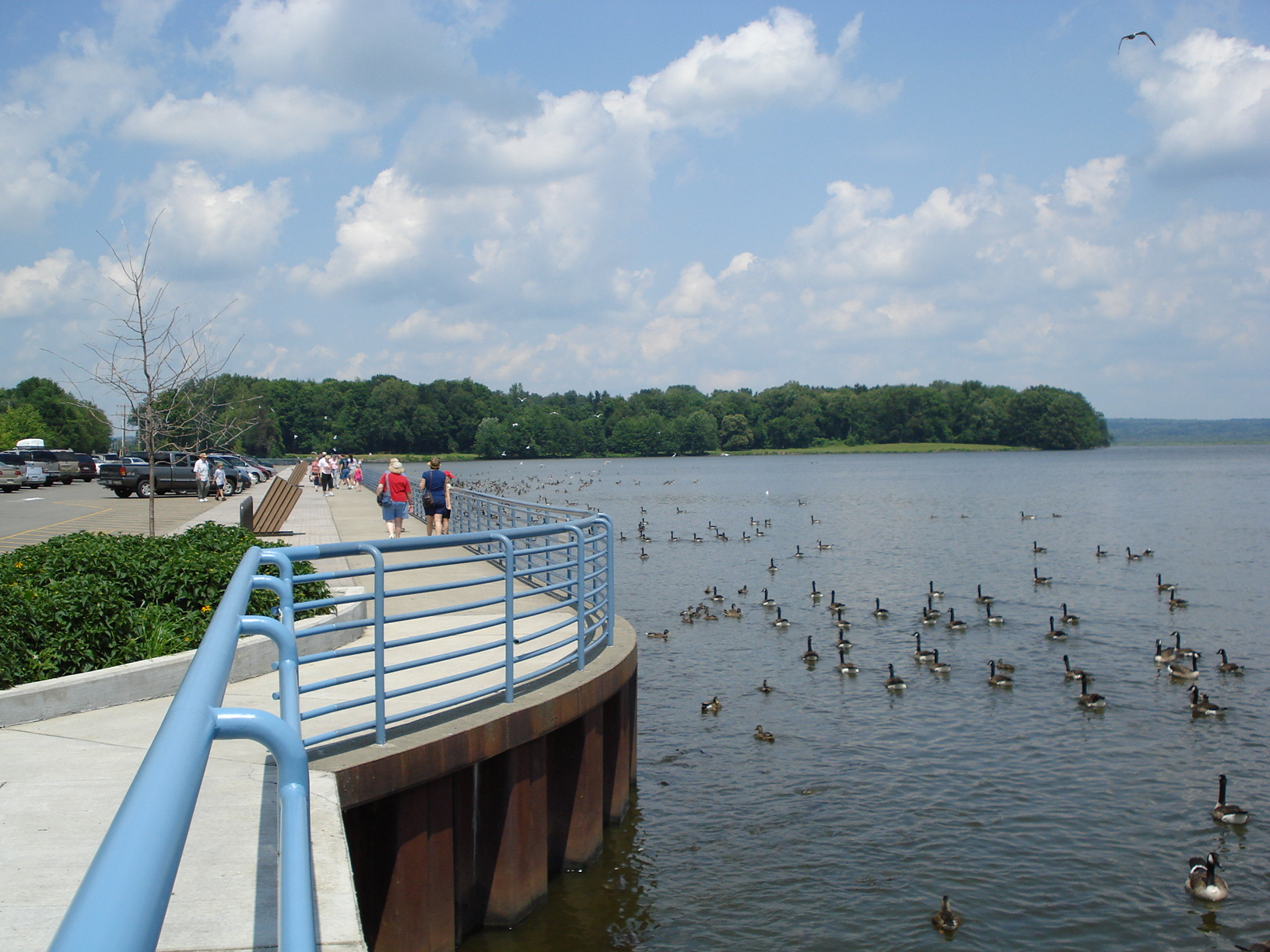
- View of Pymatuning Reservoir in Pine Township

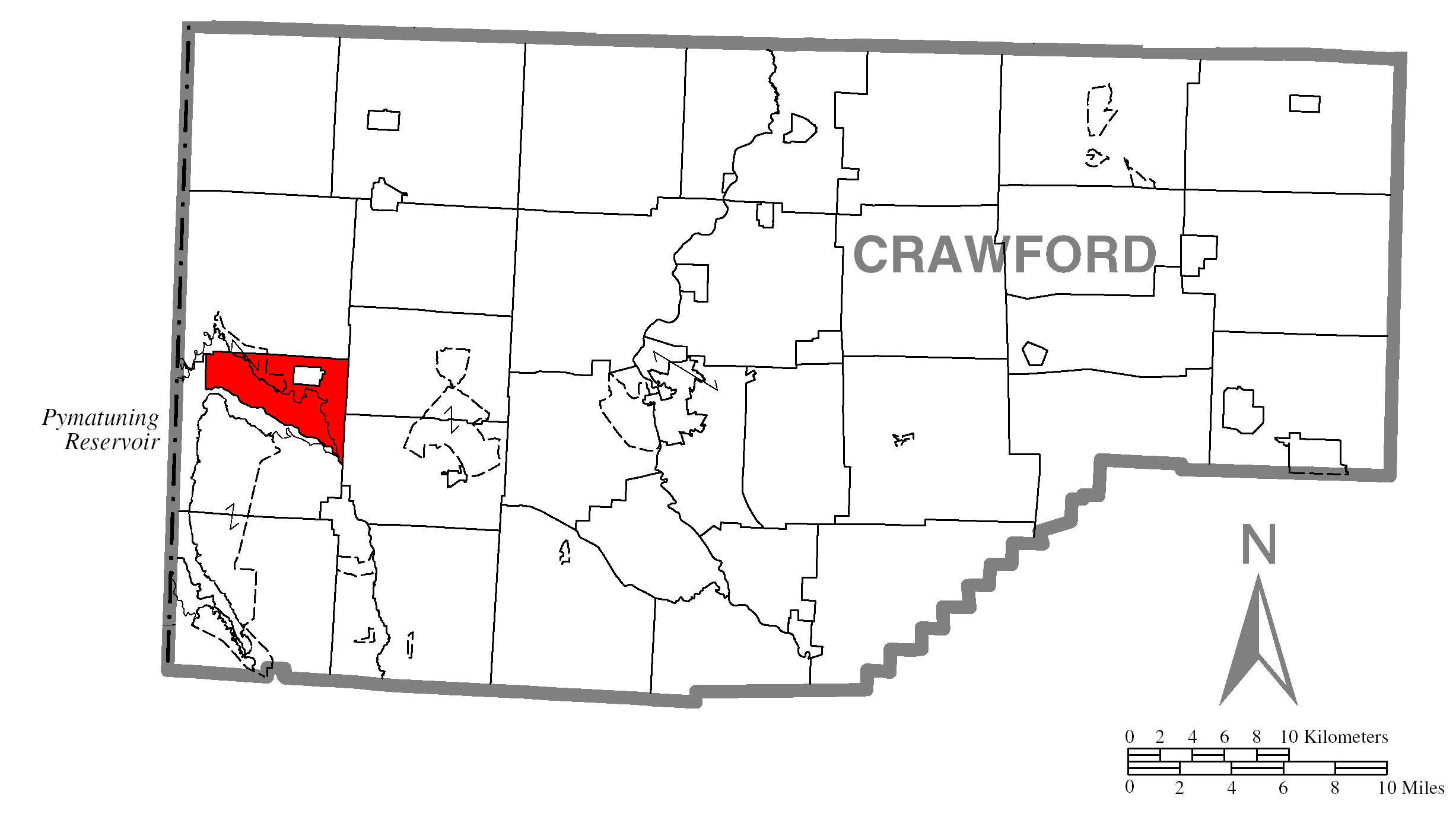
- Location of Pine Township in Crawford County

- Location of Crawford County in Pennsylvania
- Country: United States
- State: Pennsylvania
- County: Crawford County

Area
  - Total: 12.60 sq mi (32.63 km^{2})
  - Land: 6.52 sq mi (16.88 km^{2})
  - Water: 6.08 sq mi (15.75 km^{2})
- Highest elevation (northeast corner of township): 1,260 ft (380 m)
- Lowest elevation (Pymatuning Lake): 1,008 ft (307 m)

Population (2020)
  - Total: 433 ▼
  - Estimate (2024): 428
  - Density: 70/sq mi (26.9/km^{2})
- Time zone: UTC-4 (EST)
  - Summer (DST): UTC-5 (EDT)
- Area code: 814
- FIPS code: 42-039-60312

Pine Township is a township in Crawford County, Pennsylvania, United States. The population was 433 at the 2020 census, down from 462 at the 2010 census.

== Geography ==
Pine Township is located in western Crawford County, on the north side of Pymatuning Reservoir. The borough of Linesville is surrounded by the township but is a separate municipality. The Pymatuning North census-designated place, consisting of some lakeside housing developments, occupies the northwestern part of the township and extends north into Conneaut Township.

According to the United States Census Bureau, Pine Township has a total area of 12.6 square miles (32.6 km^{2}), of which 6.5 square miles (16.9 km^{2}) is land and 6.1 square miles (15.8 km^{2}), or 48.28%, is water.

== Demographics ==
Historical population
Census	Pop.	Note	%±
2000	531		—
2010	462		−13.0%
2020	433		−6.3%
2024 (est.)	428		−1.2%
U.S. Decennial Census

As of the census of 2000, there were 531 people, 224 households, and 152 families residing in the township. The population density was 80.5 inhabitants per square mile (31.1/km^{2}). There were 397 housing units at an average density of 60.2 per square mile (23.2/km^{2}). The racial makeup of the township was 95.86% White, 1.32% African American, 1.32% Native American, 0.19% Asian, 0.38% from other races, and 0.94% from two or more races. Hispanic or Latino of any race were 0.94% of the population.

There were 224 households, out of which 21.9% had children under the age of 18 living with them, 58.9% were married couples living together, 5.8% had a female householder with no husband present, and 32.1% were non-families. 25.4% of all households were made up of individuals, and 12.9% had someone living alone who was 65 years of age or older. The average household size was 2.37 and the average family size was 2.86.

In the township the population was spread out, with 19.2% under the age of 18, 5.3% from 18 to 24, 24.9% from 25 to 44, 31.6% from 45 to 64, and 19.0% who were 65 years of age or older. The median age was 45 years. For every 100 females, there were 109.1 males. For every 100 females age 18 and over, there were 107.2 males.

The median income for a household in the township was $35,795, and the median income for a family was $37,386. Males had a median income of $32,386 versus $23,438 for females. The per capita income for the township was $18,216. About 3.4% of families and 6.3% of the population were below the poverty line, including 6.7% of those under age 18 and 3.9% of those age 65 or over.
