= Sadsbury Township, Crawford County, Pennsylvania =

Township in Pennsylvania, US

Coordinates: 41°36′00″N 80°19′59″W

- Township
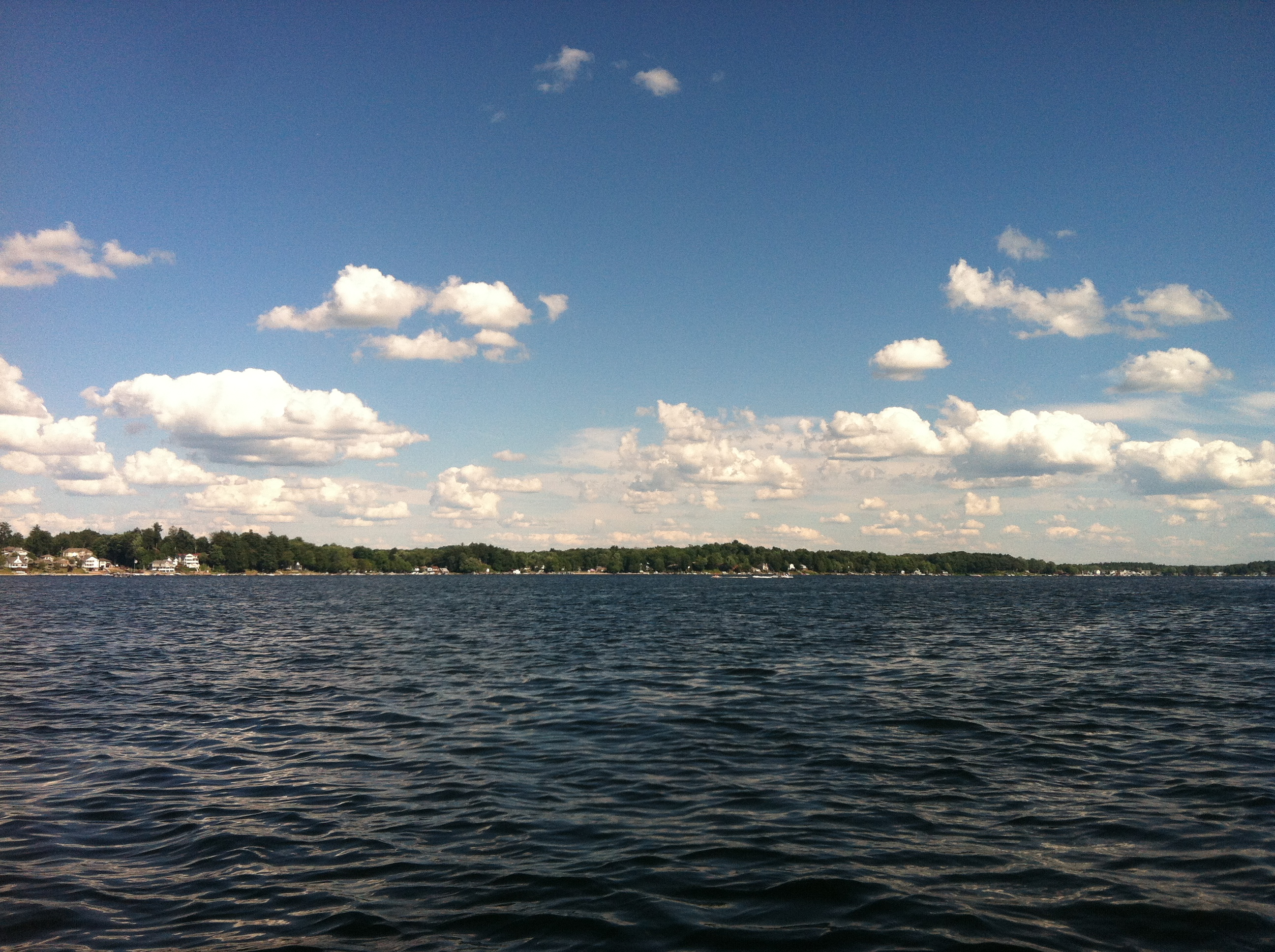
- Conneaut Lake

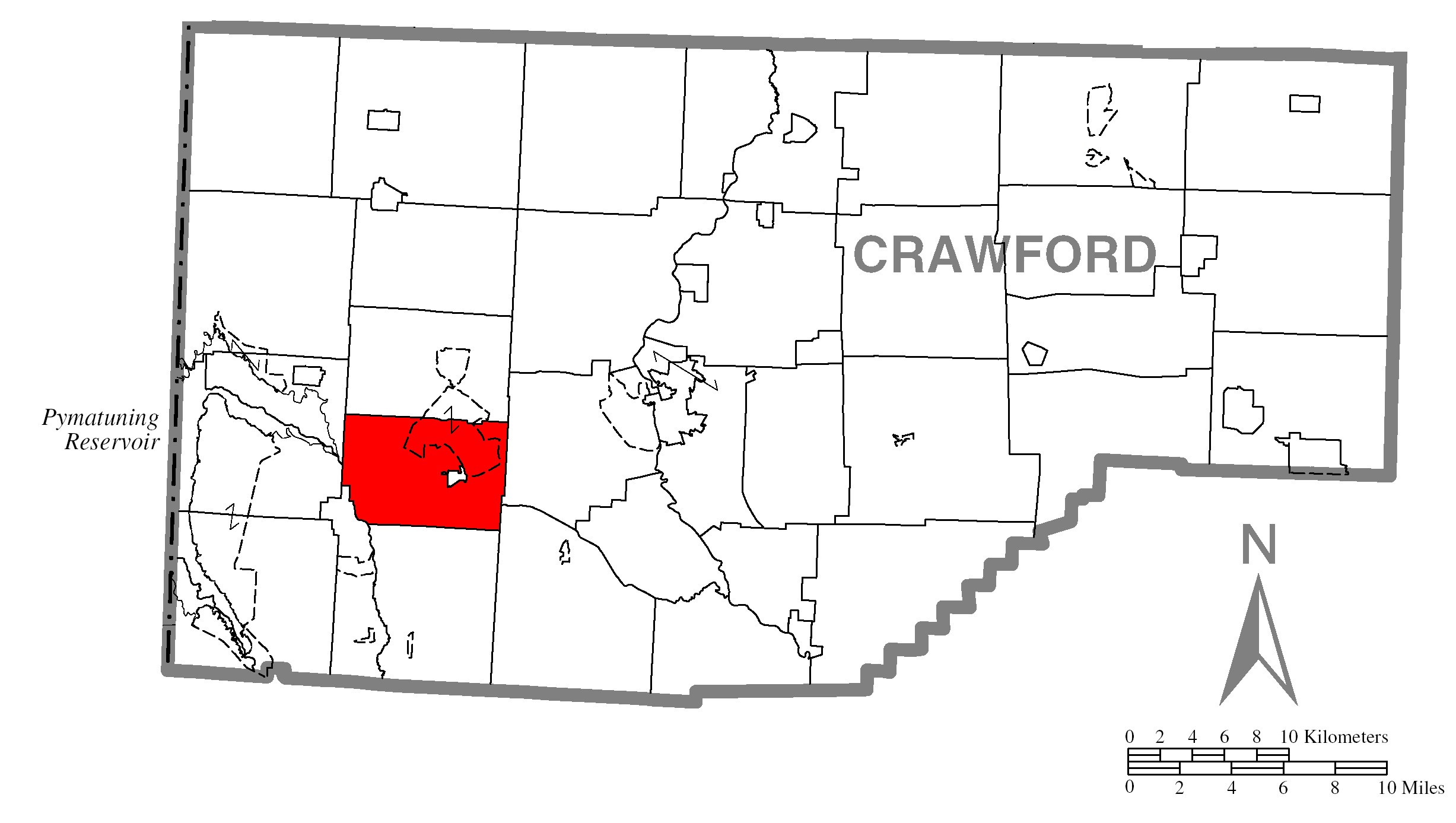
- Location of Sadsbury Township in Crawford County

- Location of Crawford County in Pennsylvania
- Country: United States
- State: Pennsylvania
- County: Crawford County

Area
  - Total: 25.08 sq mi (64.95 km^{2})
  - Land: 23.67 sq mi (61.31 km^{2})
  - Water: 1.40 sq mi (3.63 km^{2})
- Highest elevation (northeast boundary): 1,300 ft (400 m)
- Lowest elevation (Shenango River above Pymatuning Reservoir): 1,010 ft (310 m)

Population (2020)
  - Total: 2,755 ▼
  - Estimate (2024): 2,709
  - Density: 121.8/sq mi (47.04/km^{2})
- Time zone: UTC-4 (EST)
  - Summer (DST): UTC-5 (EDT)
- Area code: 814
- FIPS code: 42-039-67088
- Website: sadsburytownship.com

Sadsbury Township is a township in Crawford County, Pennsylvania, United States. The population was 2,755 at the 2020 census, down from 2,933 at the 2010 census.

== Geography ==
Sadsbury Township is in western Crawford County. Conneaut Lake occupies the northeastern portion of the township, and the borough of Conneaut Lake is at the southern end of the lake, surrounded by the township but a separate municipality. Housing developments around the lake outside of the borough are part of the Conneaut Lakeshore census-designated place, which along with the lake extends north into Summit Township. The unincorporated community of Shermansville is in the northwestern part of Sadsbury Township.

According to the United States Census Bureau, the township has a total area of 25.1 square miles (64.9 km^{2}), of which 23.7 square miles (61.3 km^{2}) is land and 1.4 square miles (3.6 km^{2}), or 5.60%, is water.

== Demographics ==
Historical population
Census	Pop.	Note	%±
2000	2,941		—
2010	2,933		−0.3%
2020	2,755		−6.1%
2024 (est.)	2,709		−1.7%
U.S. Decennial Census

As of the census of 2000, there were 2,941 people, 1,274 households, and 845 families residing in the township. The population density was 124.0 inhabitants per square mile (47.9/km^{2}). There were 2,177 housing units at an average density of 91.8 per square mile (35.4/km^{2}). The racial makeup of the township was 99.35% White, 0.07% African American, 0.07% Native American, 0.07% Asian, 0.03% Pacific Islander, 0.03% from other races, and 0.37% from two or more races. Hispanic or Latino of any race were 0.24% of the population.

There were 1,274 households, out of which 24.6% had children under the age of 18 living with them, 56.3% were married couples living together, 7.4% had a female householder with no husband present, and 33.6% were non-families. 27.9% of all households were made up of individuals, and 10.9% had someone living alone who was 65 years of age or older. The average household size was 2.31 and the average family size was 2.80.

In the township the population was spread out, with 20.9% under the age of 18, 5.9% from 18 to 24, 26.6% from 25 to 44, 29.5% from 45 to 64, and 17.1% who were 65 years of age or older. The median age was 43 years. For every 100 females there were 97.6 males. For every 100 females age 18 and over, there were 96.3 males.

The median income for a household in the township was $38,207, and the median income for a family was $42,708. Males had a median income of $36,792 versus $21,631 for females. The per capita income for the township was $20,615. About 4.0% of families and 6.3% of the population were below the poverty line, including 7.1% of those under age 18 and 2.3% of those age 65 or over.
