= Conneaut Lake =

Lake in Crawford County, Pennsylvania, United States

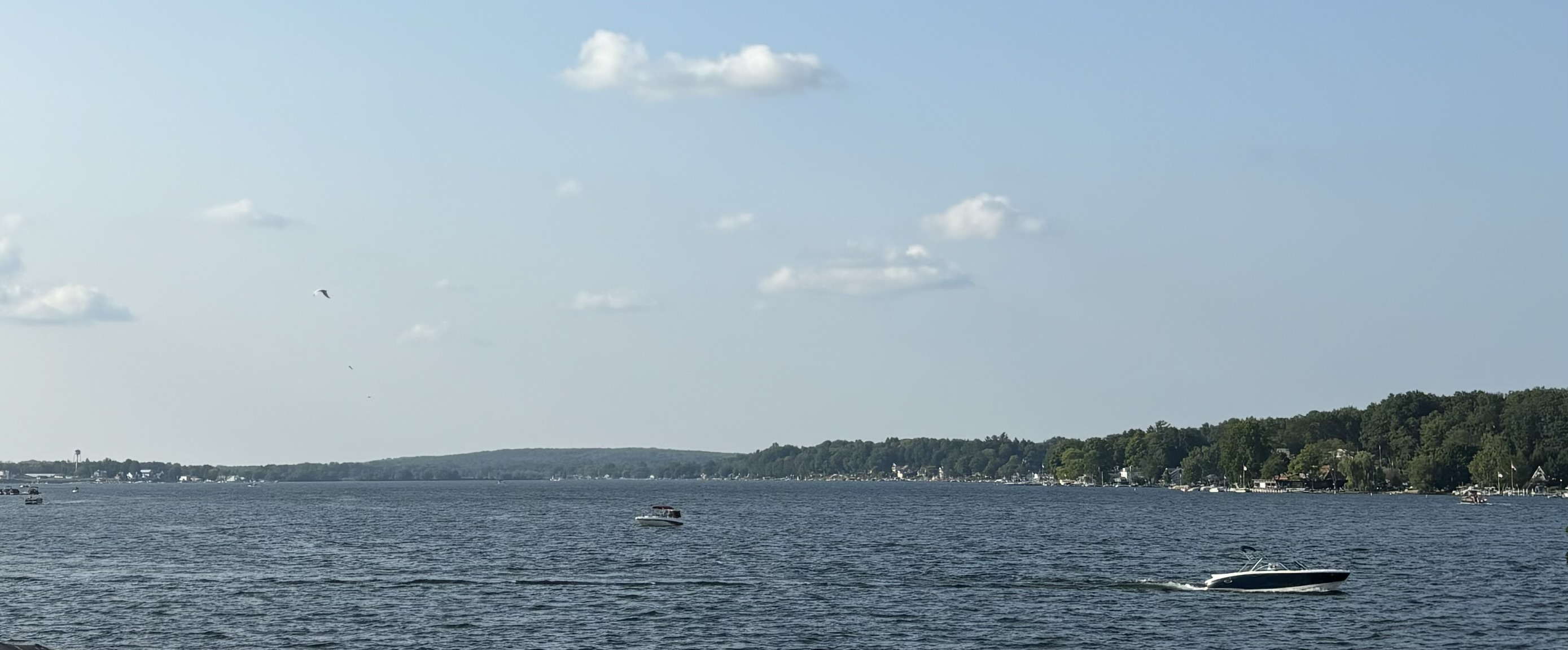
- View of Conneaut Lake from the southern shore near town

- Location within Pennsylvania
- Location: Crawford County, Pennsylvania
- Coordinates: 41°37′20″N 80°18′20″W
- Type: Natural Lake
- Primary outflows: Conneaut Outlet
- Basin countries: United States
- Max. length: Approx. 3 mi (4.8 km)
- Max. width: Approx. 1 mi (1.6 km)
- Surface area: 925 acres (374 ha)
- Average depth: 29 ft (8.8 m)
- Max. depth: Approx. 80 ft (24 m)
- Surface elevation: 1,070 ft (326 m)
- Islands: 2 (not named)
- Settlements: Conneaut Lake, Pennsylvania; Conneaut Lakeshore (CDP)

Conneaut Lake /ˈkɒniˌɔːt/ is the largest natural lake in Pennsylvania, United States, by surface area. It is located in western Crawford County near a town with the same name. It has a surface area of approximately 925 acres. The site of the lake is actually in adjacent Sadsbury Township and nearby Summit Township. During the summer season, it is heavily populated with people vacationing to the lake area, some from the area spending time in their houses on the lake, and many others from the surrounding area that like to spend the summer away from home, many of these people being residents of the Pittsburgh area. Other than the lake itself, the largest draw to the area has long been a popular resort known as Conneaut Lake Park, long known for its amusement park.

== Geography ==
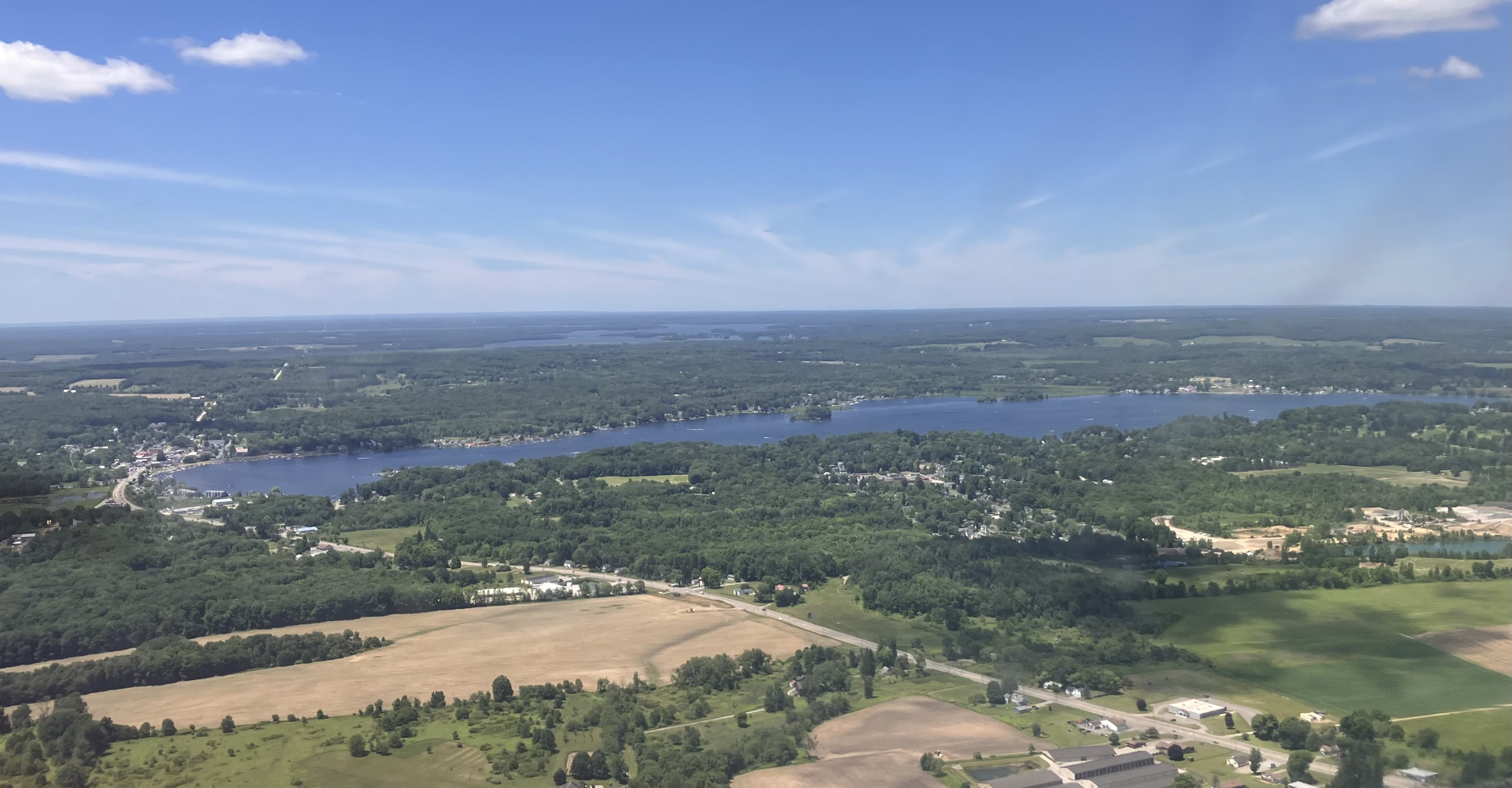
View of the lake from ~800 ft above the ground.

Conneaut Lake was formed as a kettle lake at the end of the Pleistocene. A large block of ice broke off the receding ice front and was surrounded by accumulating sediment. After the ice melted, the resulting depression was filled with water forming the lake. Water flows into Conneaut Lake through Inlet Run, a small stream on the north end of the lake. Water exits through the Conneaut Outlet, a larger creek which flows to the south through the Conneaut Marsh. The Conneaut outlet flows into French Creek, making it part of the Mississippi River drainage.

=== Depth ===
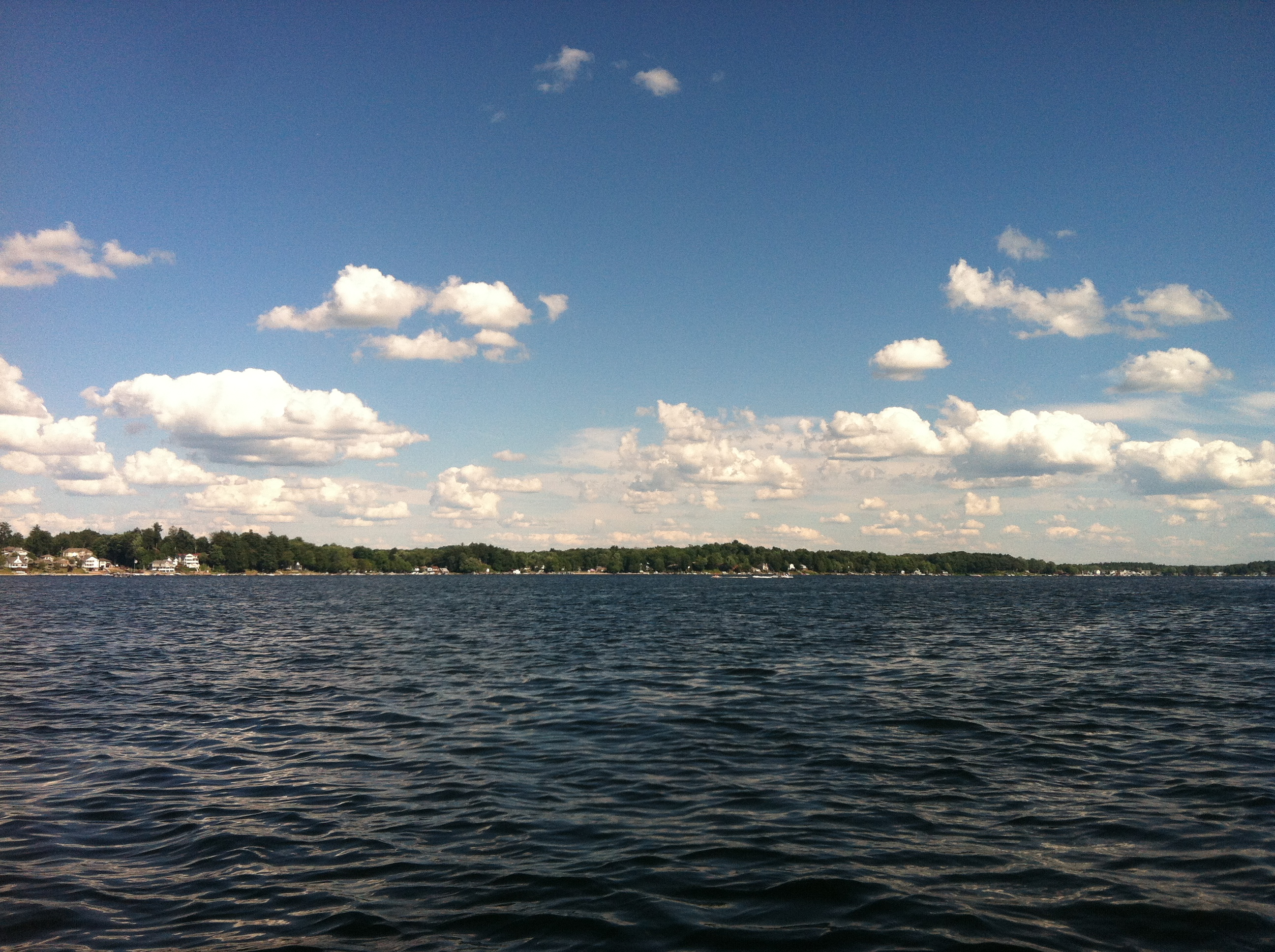
Panoramic view of Conneaut Lake from the northwest shore

Conneaut Lake's depth has a wide range. Most of the lake is shallow near the shoreline, before quickly dropping off to greater depths near the center. In most areas the lake is around 20 to 40 feet (6.1 to 12.2 m) deep, with an average depth of 29 feet (8.8 m). There are several pockets around the lake with greater depths (referred to as "deeps" on local maps) reaching over 50 feet (15 m) deep. The lake's maximum depth is generally approximated to be around 75 feet (23 m), although some maps show a maximum depth of 85 feet (26 m).

== History ==
Before the early 19th century, Conneaut Lake was conspicuously absent from maps of the region, while much smaller nearby lakes were shown. The first recorded account of the lake was on May 5, 1791. A settler named Cornelius Van Horn was captured by Wyandots or their allies near what is today Meadville, Pennsylvania. He was taken on a path through the forest and bound to a tree near the lake's outlet. Van Horn managed to free himself using a small knife.

The Lake level was raised about 10 ft (3.0 m) in the 1820s to permit the construction of the Beaver and Erie Canal. In the 1870s, canals were made obsolete by railroads, and the lake was returned to its natural elevation, though a dam remains for flood control. Before the construction of large reservoirs, Conneaut was the largest lake in Pennsylvania other than Lake Erie. The advent of rail travel made it a popular place for recreation. An amusement park, Conneaut Lake Park, was built on its western shore. The lake is notable as a site of early motorboat racing. The deep, cold waters of the lake allow it to stay frozen relatively late into the spring. This made Conneaut Lake a vital source of ice, prior to mechanical refrigeration.

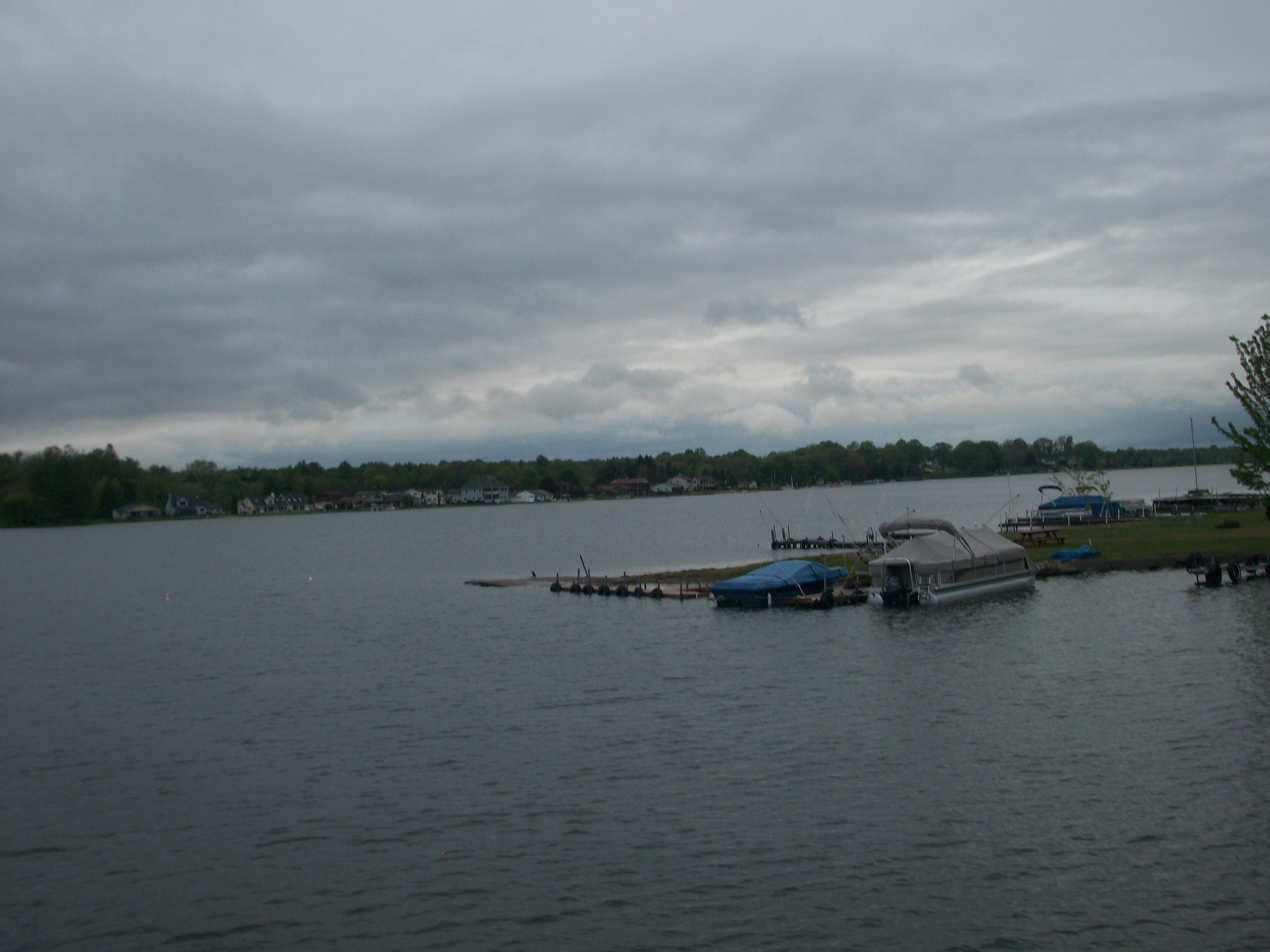
Centre of the lake on a cloudy day.

During the later part of the 20th century, Conneaut Lake's prominence as a tourist destination began to decline. Automobile and air travel allowed people to travel further from the cities for their vacations/weekend leisure. Streams were dammed, forming several reservoirs larger than Conneaut Lake throughout the area. Despite this, the lake remains popular in Western Pennsylvania thanks in part due to its lack of power restrictions which continues to draw powerboats, along with a reputation for being an excellent lake for fishing.

Between the two settlements on the lake (the town and the CDP), approximately 3,000 people live around Conneaut Lake.

== See also ==
- Harveys Lake (Pennsylvania), the largest natural lake in Pennsylvania by volume
- Raystown Lake, the largest man made reservoir in Pennsylvania
- List of lakes in Pennsylvania
