= Conneaut Township, Crawford County, Pennsylvania =

Township in Pennsylvania, US

Coordinates: 41°43′00″N 80°26′59″W

- Township
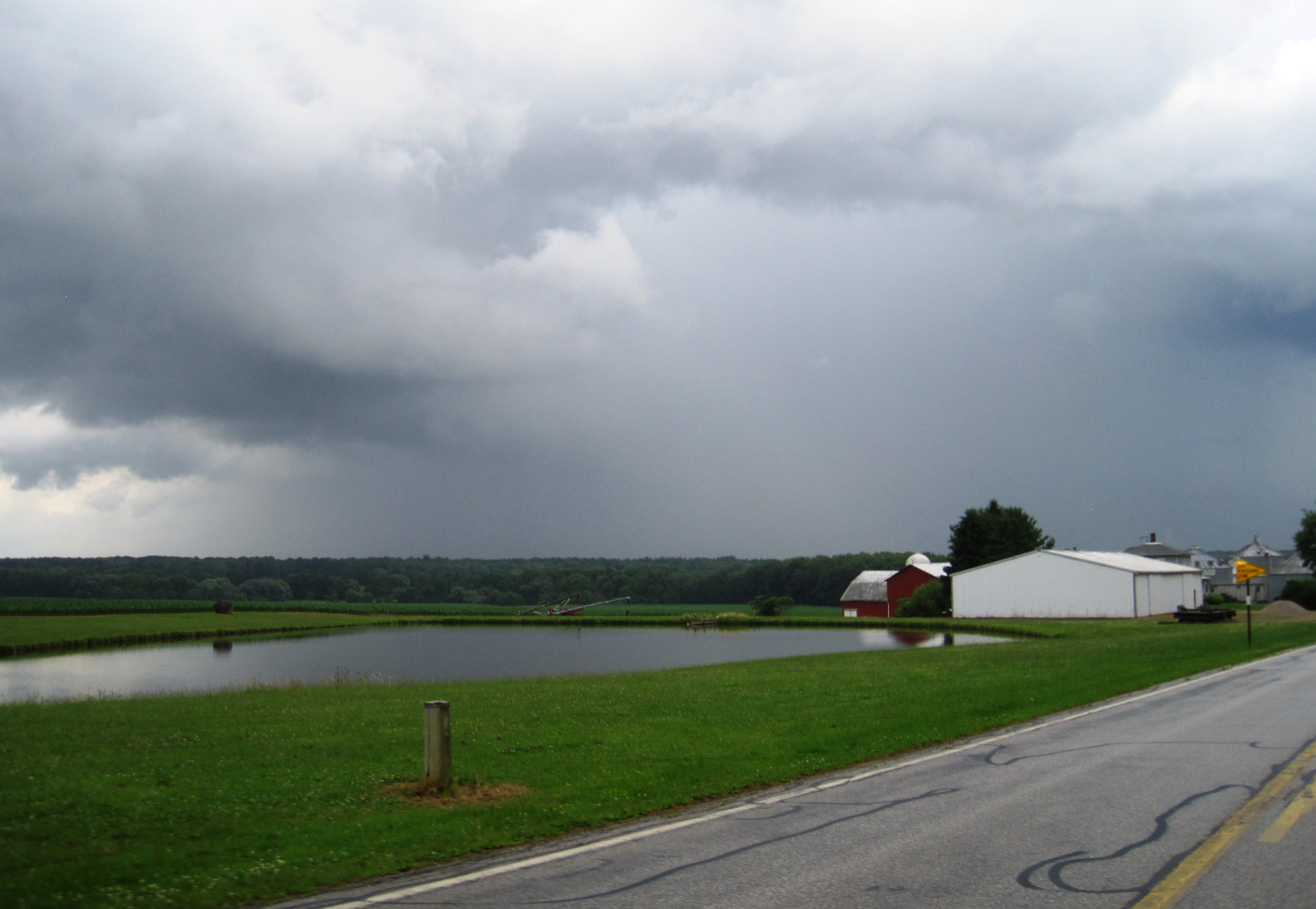
- Farm along US 6 in Conneaut Township

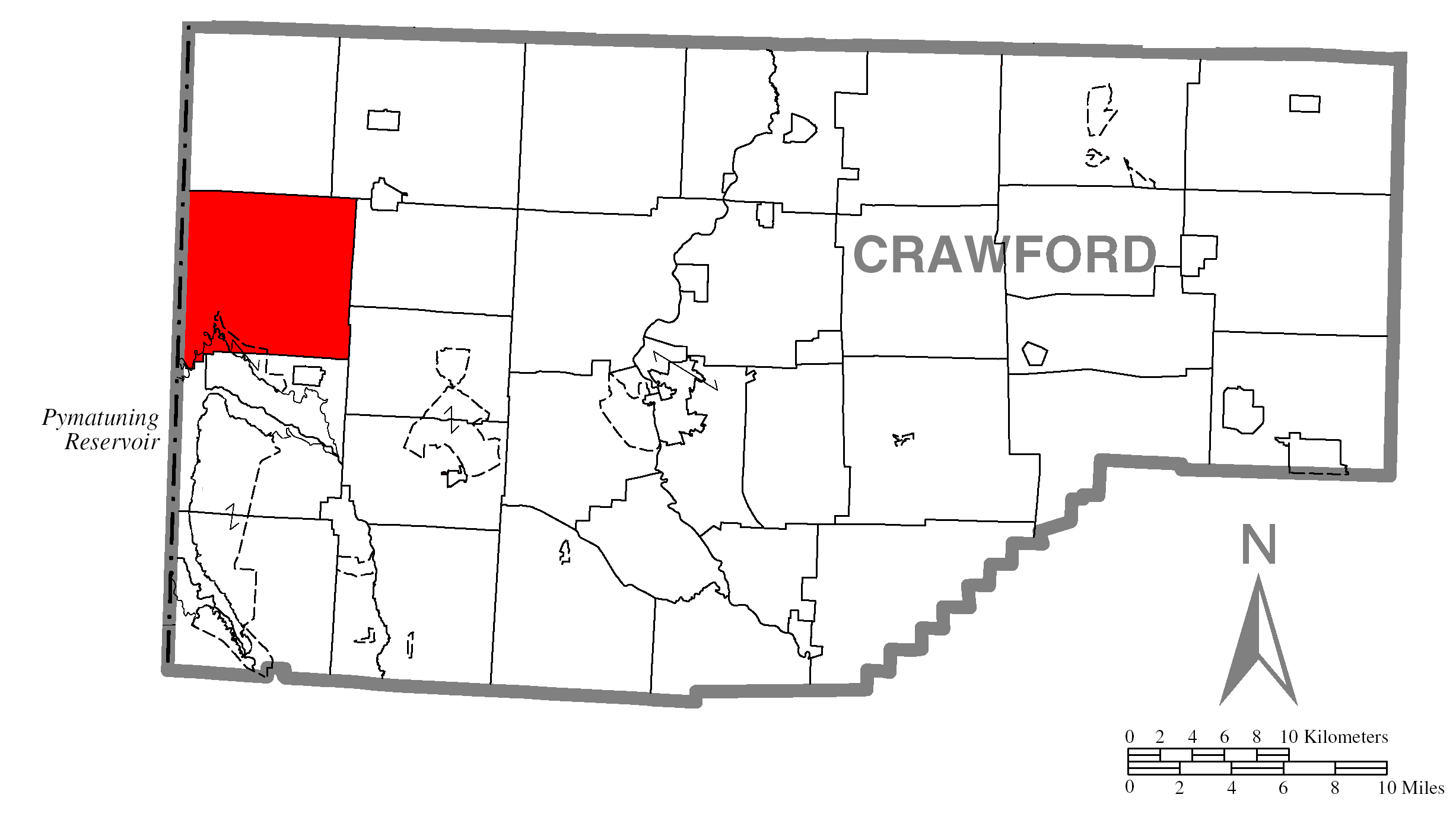
- Location of Conneaut Township in Crawford County

- Location of Crawford County in Pennsylvania
- Country: United States
- State: Pennsylvania
- County: Crawford County

Area
  - Total: 41.66 sq mi (107.90 km^{2})
  - Land: 40.88 sq mi (105.87 km^{2})
  - Water: 0.78 sq mi (2.02 km^{2})
- Highest elevation (Northeast of Linesville, Pennsylvania): 1,280 ft (390 m)
- Lowest elevation (Pymatuning Lake): 1,080 ft (330 m)

Population (2020)
  - Total: 1,331
  - Estimate (2024): 1,307
  - Density: 34.7/sq mi (13.38/km^{2})
- Time zone: UTC-4 (EST)
  - Summer (DST): UTC-5 (EDT)
- Area code: 814
- FIPS code: 42-039-15728

Conneaut Township is a township in Crawford County, Pennsylvania, United States. The population was 1,331 at the 2020 census.

== Geography ==
Conneaut Township is in western Crawford County, bordered to the west by Ashtabula County, Ohio. According to the United States Census Bureau, the township has a total area of 41.7 square miles (107.9 km^{2}), of which 40.9 square miles (105.9 km^{2}) is land and 0.77 square miles (2.0 km^{2}), or 1.88%, is water. The northern end of the Pymatuning Reservoir, one of the largest reservoirs in Pennsylvania, is in the southwest. The township includes the unincorporated communities of Steamburg, Pennline, Conneaut Center, and Center Road, as well as the northern half of the Pymatuning North census-designated place.

=== Natural features ===
Geologic province: Northwestern Glaciated Plateau
Lowest elevation: 1,008 ft (307 m) at Pymatuning Reservoir
Highest elevation: 1,280 ft (390 m) at high point on township line northeast of Linesville
Major rivers/streams and watersheds: Conneaut Creek and Shenango River
Minor rivers/streams and watersheds:

- Conneaut Creek tributaries (eastern township): Foster Run, Meyler Run, and Fish Creek
- Shenango River tributaries (central and western township): Paden Creek and Linesville Creek

Lakes and bodies of water: Pymatuning Lake (impoundment)
Biological Diversity Areas: Blackjack Swamp BDA, Linesville Creek Headwaters Wetland BDA
Landscape Conservation Area: Pymatuning Marsh LCA
Important Bird Area: Pymatuning-Hartstown

== Demographics ==
Historical population
Census	Pop.	Note	%±
2000	1,550		—
2010	1,476		−4.8%
2020	1,331		−9.8%
2024 (est.)	1,307		−1.8%
U.S. Decennial Census

As of the census of 2000, there were 1,550 people, 569 households, and 434 families residing in the township. The population density was 37.9 inhabitants per square mile (14.6/km^{2}). There were 791 housing units at an average density of 19.3/sq mi (7.5/km^{2}). The racial makeup of the township was 98.71% White, 0.13% African American, 0.06% Native American, and 1.10% from two or more races. Hispanic or Latino of any race were 0.06% of the population.

There were 569 households, out of which 32.2% had children under the age of 18 living with them, 63.3% were married couples living together, 8.6% had a female householder with no husband present, and 23.6% were non-families. 19.9% of all households were made up of individuals, and 7.9% had someone living alone who was 65 years of age or older. The average household size was 2.72 and the average family size was 3.11.

In the township the population was spread out, with 27.6% under the age of 18, 6.3% from 18 to 24, 26.5% from 25 to 44, 25.9% from 45 to 64, and 13.6% who were 65 years of age or older. The median age was 39 years. For every 100 females, there were 103.7 males. For every 100 females age 18 and over, there were 102.9 males.

The median income for a household in the township was $33,512, and the median income for a family was $40,391. Males had a median income of $28,669 versus $22,557 for females. The per capita income for the township was $14,493. About 10.5% of families and 16.5% of the population were below the poverty line, including 29.0% of those under age 18 and 10.8% of those age 65 or over.
