= Conneaut Lake, Pennsylvania =

Borough in Pennsylvania, US

- Borough
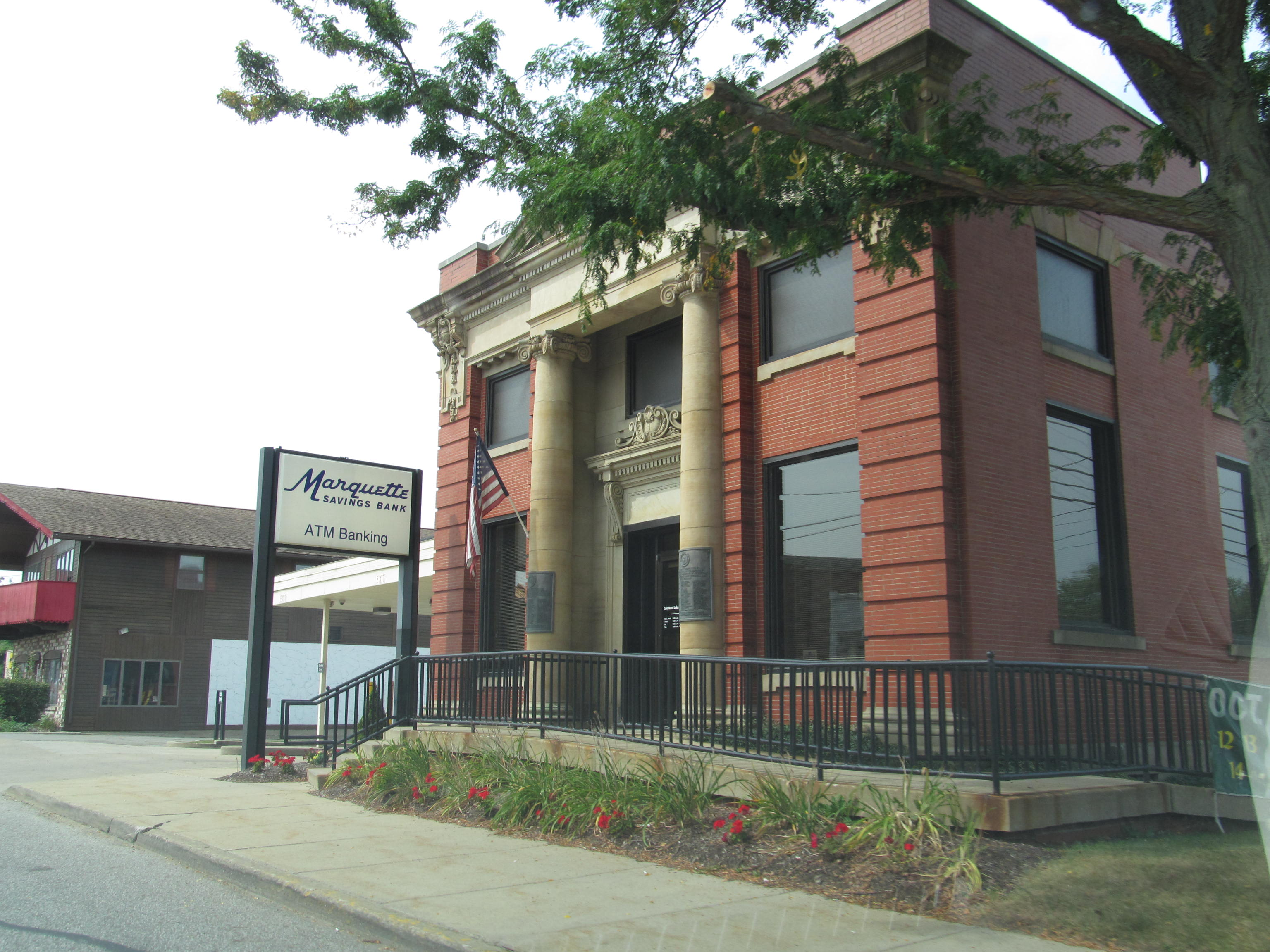
- Lake Road (U.S. Route 6)
- Etymology: Conneaut Lake
- Location of Conneaut Lake in Crawford County, Pennsylvania.

- Location of Conneaut Lake in Pennsylvania
- Coordinates: 41°36′8″N 80°18′24″W
- Country: United States
- State: Pennsylvania
- County: Crawford
- Founded: 1796

Government
  - Mayor: Joel F. Agnew (R)

Area
  - Total: 0.37 sq mi (0.97 km^{2})
  - Land: 0.37 sq mi (0.97 km^{2})
  - Water: 0 sq mi (0.00 km^{2})
- Elevation (middle of borough): 1,085 ft (331 m)
- Highest elevation (southwest corner of borough): 1,140 ft (350 m)
- Lowest elevation (Conneaut Lake): 1,073 ft (327 m)

Population (2020)
  - Total: 625
  - Density: 1,664.5/sq mi (642.66/km^{2})
- Time zone: UTC-4 (EST)
  - Summer (DST): UTC-5 (EDT)
- ZIP code: 16316
- Area code: 814
- FIPS code: 42-15744
- Website: https://conneautlakeborough.com/

Conneaut Lake /ˈkɒniˌɔːt/ is a borough in Crawford County, Pennsylvania, located at the southern end of the lake of the same name. The population was 625 at the 2020 census, down from 653 at the 2010 census.

== History ==
The town was founded in 1799 as "Evansburg", named after a local farmer, Abner Evans, who had opened a successful mill, of which several more followed. The town's population would continue to grow as soon it would be connected to other towns by a canal and later by railroad.

By the 1880s the town's economy boomed with the foundation of several important businesses, most notably, the famous tool company Channellock and The Conneaut Lake Ice Company (which was a major supplier of fresh ice for cities and towns around the region).

Over time, locals around the area began colloquially referring to the town by the same name as the neighboring lake, which lead to the town being officially renamed Conneaut Lake in 1892. The same year the famous local park was also opened, and the town became become a major tourist destination in Western Pennsylvania.

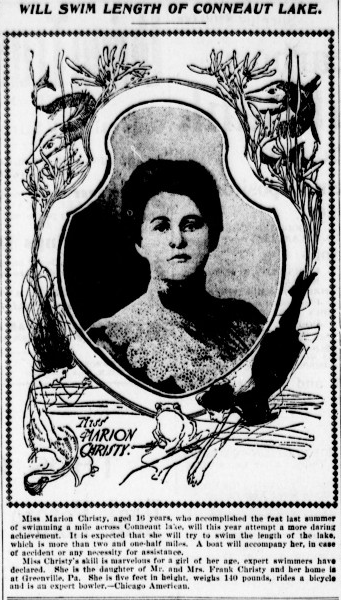
Announcement of Marion Christy swimming Conneaut Lake in 1901.

In 1907 trolley lines were installed that connected the town and park with several other local towns, but by the 1920s these were mostly removed due to the automobile rendering it obsolete.

By the 1930s the rise of refrigeration meant that most towns no longer needed fresh ice to preserve food, and thus saw the closure of the town's Ice Company. This along with the closure/moving of other companies caused town's local population to decline (although the population rose once again in the mid 20th century). Today the town serves mainly as a resort town, home to many shops, restaurants and other amenities.

== Geography ==
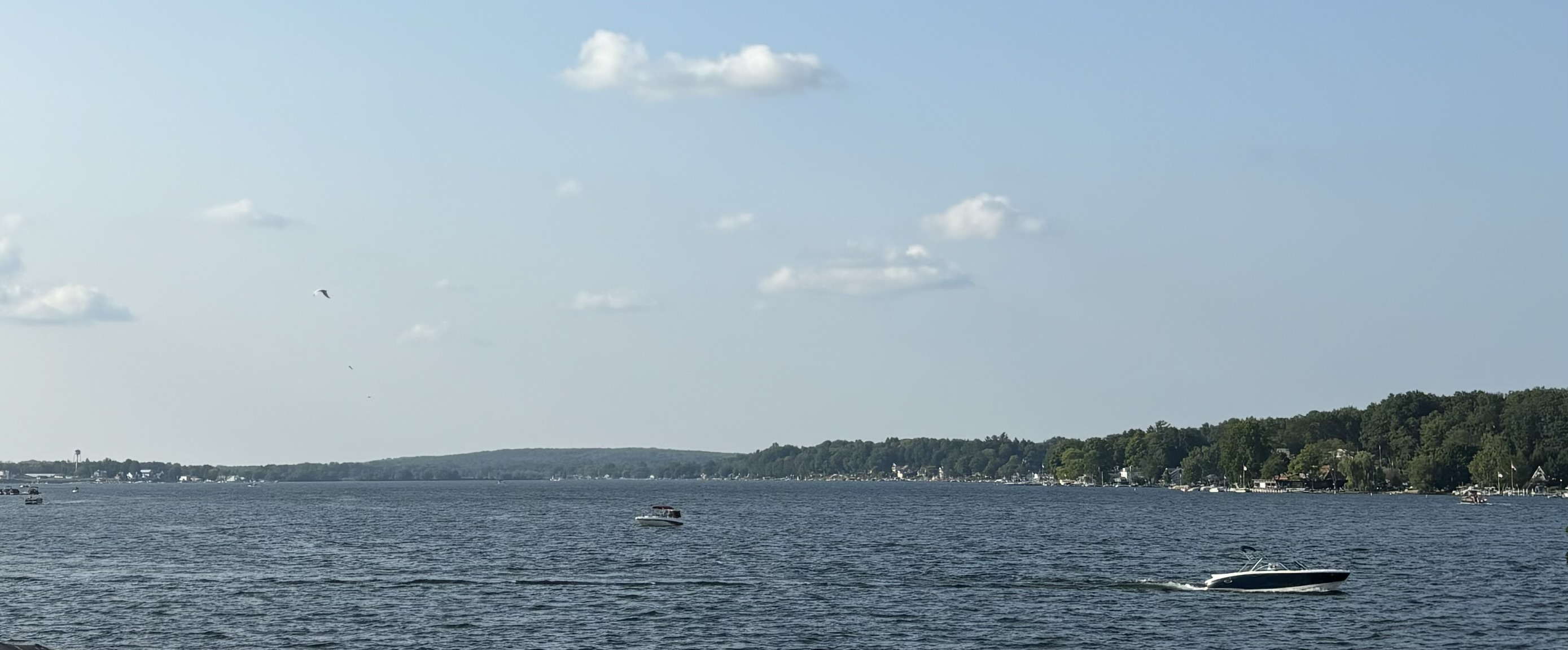
Conneaut Lake as viewed from the east end of town

Conneaut Lake borough is located southwest of the center of Crawford County at 41°36′8″N 80°18′24″W (41.602322, -80.306733). Its northeastern border follows Second Street, which parallels the southwestern shore of Conneaut Lake, the largest natural lake in Pennsylvania. The entire borough is surrounded by Sadsbury Township, a separate municipality.

According to the United States Census Bureau, the borough has a total area of 0.36 square miles (0.94 km^{2}), all land. U.S. routes 6 and 322 pass through the borough, leading east together 9 miles (14 km) to Meadville, the Crawford County seat. US 6 leads northwest 7.5 miles (12.1 km) to Linesville at the northeast end of Pymatuning Reservoir and 14 miles (23 km) to the Ohio border, while US 322 leads southwest 12 miles (19 km) to Jamestown at the southern end of Pymatuning Reservoir and 17 miles (27 km) to the Ohio border.

Conneaut Lake Park, the local amusement resort which opened over 130 years ago, is located 3 miles (5 km) north of the borough, near the northwestern end of the lake.

== Demographics ==
Historical population
| Census | Pop. | Note | %± |
|---|---|---|---|
| 1860 | 197 | | — |
| 1870 | 174 | | −11.7% |
| 1880 | 197 | | 13.2% |
| 1890 | 291 | | 47.7% |
| 1900 | 343 | | 17.9% |
| 1910 | 725 | | 111.4% |
| 1920 | 347 | | −52.1% |
| 1930 | 496 | | 42.9% |
| 1940 | 598 | | 20.6% |
| 1950 | 676 | | 13.0% |
| 1960 | 700 | | 3.6% |
| 1970 | 745 | | 6.4% |
| 1980 | 767 | | 3.0% |
| 1990 | 699 | | −8.9% |
| 2000 | 708 | | 1.3% |
| 2010 | 653 | | −7.8% |
| 2020 | 624 | | −4.4% |
| 2022 (est.) | 617 | ▼ | −1.1% |

As of the census of 2000, there were 708 people, 331 households, and 187 families residing in the borough. The population density was 1,927.9 inhabitants per square mile (744.4/km^{2}). There were 370 housing units at an average density of 1,007.5 per square mile (389.0/km^{2}). The racial makeup of the borough was 97.18% White, 0.14% African American, 0.14% Native American, 1.98% Asian, 0.14% Pacific Islander, and 0.42% from two or more races. Hispanic or Latino of any race were 0.42% of the population.

There were 331 households, out of which 22.7% had children under the age of 18 living with them, 41.7% were married couples living together, 11.5% had a female householder with no husband present, and 43.5% were non-families. 35.6% of all households were made up of individuals, and 15.7% had someone living alone who was 65 years of age or older. The average household size was 2.14 and the average family size was 2.80.

In the borough the population was spread out, with 20.3% under the age of 18, 7.6% from 18 to 24, 27.3% from 25 to 44, 26.0% from 45 to 64, and 18.8% who were 65 years of age or older. The median age was 40 years. For every 100 females there were 87.3 males. For every 100 females age 18 and over, there were 83.1 males.

The median income for a household in the borough was $34,306, and the median income for a family was $42,375. Males had a median income of $35,000 versus $21,417 for females. The per capita income for the borough was $18,486. About 5.5% of families and 7.5% of the population were below the poverty line, including 8.2% of those under age 18 and 11.7% of those age 65 or over.
