= Summit Township, Crawford County, Pennsylvania =

Township in Pennsylvania, US

Coordinates: 41°40′00″N 80°22′59″W

- Township
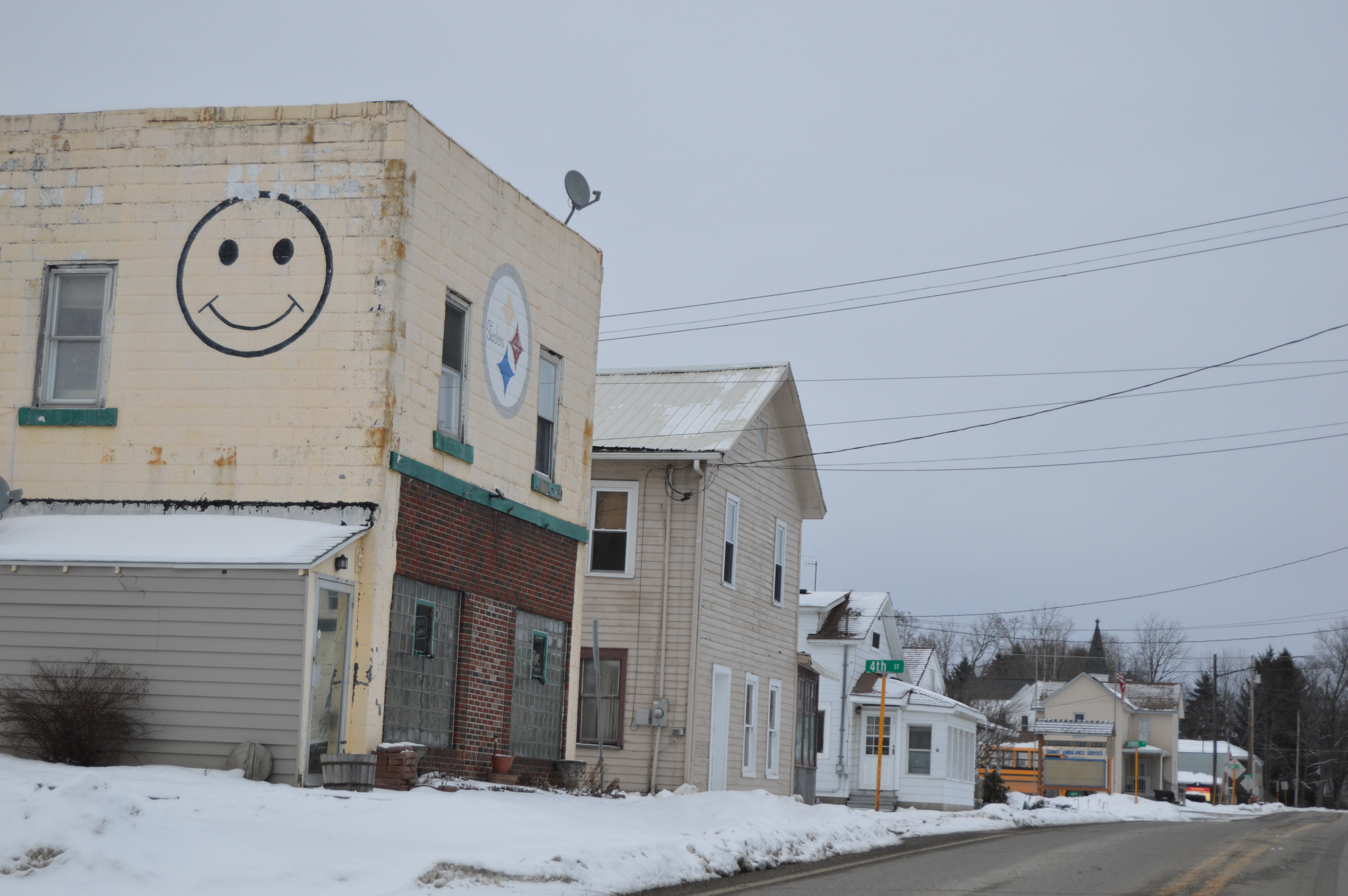
- Plum Street in Harmonsburg

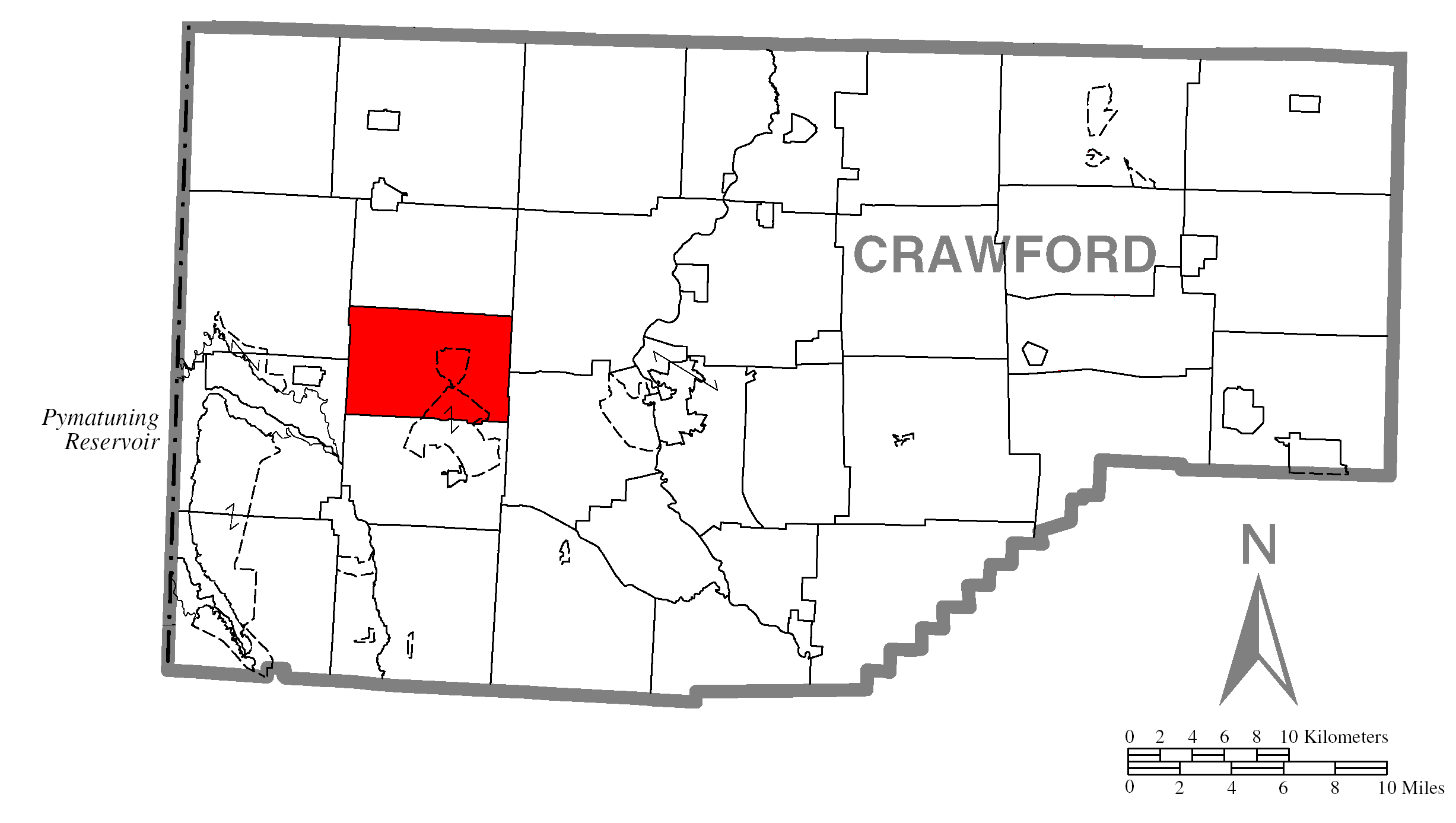
- Location of Summit Township in Crawford County

- Location of Crawford County in Pennsylvania
- Country: United States
- State: Pennsylvania
- County: Crawford County

Area
  - Total: 26.03 sq mi (67.43 km^{2})
  - Land: 25.82 sq mi (66.88 km^{2})
  - Water: 0.21 sq mi (0.55 km^{2})
- Highest elevation (northeast corner of township): 1,410 ft (430 m)
- Lowest elevation (Conneaut Lake): 1,073 ft (327 m)

Population (2020)
  - Total: 1,901 ▼
  - Estimate (2024): 1,877
  - Density: 76.3/sq mi (29.47/km^{2})
- Time zone: UTC-4 (EST)
  - Summer (DST): UTC-5 (EDT)
- Area code: 814
- FIPS code: 42-039-75200
- Website: summitcrawford.com

Summit Township is a township in Crawford County, Pennsylvania, United States. The population was 1,901 at the 2020 census, down from 2,027 at the 2010 census.

== Geography ==
Summit Township is in western Crawford County and contains the unincorporated community of Harmonsburg. The northern end of Conneaut Lake is in the southeastern part of the township, and Conneaut Lake Park is partially in the township along its southern border. The residential communities around the lake are part of the Conneaut Lakeshore census-designated place.

According to the United States Census Bureau, the township has a total area of 26.0 square miles (67.4 km^{2}), of which 25.8 square miles (66.9 km^{2}) is land and 0.2 square miles (0.5 km^{2}), or 0.81%, is water.

== Demographics ==
Historical population
Census	Pop.	Note	%±
2000	2,172		—
2010	2,027		−6.7%
2020	1,901		−6.2%
2024 (est.)	1,877		−1.3%
U.S. Decennial Census

As of the census of 2000, there were 2,172 people, 902 households and 640 families residing in the township. The population density was 84.3 inhabitants per square mile (32.5/km^{2}). There were 1,333 housing units at an average density of 51.8 per square mile (20.0/km^{2}). The racial makeup of the township was 99.45% White, 0.05% African American, 0.09% Native American, 0.05% Asian, and 0.37% from two or more races. Hispanic or Latino of any race were 0.51% of the population.

There were 902 households, of which 28.7% had children under the age of 18 living with them, 58.8% were married couples living together, 8.9% had a female householder with no husband present, and 29.0% were non-families. 24.6% of all households were made up of individuals, and 9.3% had someone living alone who was 65 years of age or older. The average household size was 2.41 and the average family size was 2.84.

In the township the population was spread out, with 22.8% under the age of 18, 6.3% from 18 to 24, 29.1% from 25 to 44, 27.4% from 45 to 64, and 14.4% who were 65 years of age or older. The median age was 41 years. For every 100 females there were 104.9 males. For every 100 females age 18 and over, there were 104.4 males.

The median income for a household in the township was $35,475, and the median income for a family was $38,295. Males had a median income of $31,315 versus $21,125 for females. The per capita income for the township was $17,109. About 7.2% of families and 9.7% of the population were below the poverty line, including 13.1% of those under age 18 and 5.6% of those age 65 or over.
