= Linesville, Pennsylvania =

Borough in Pennsylvania, US

- Borough
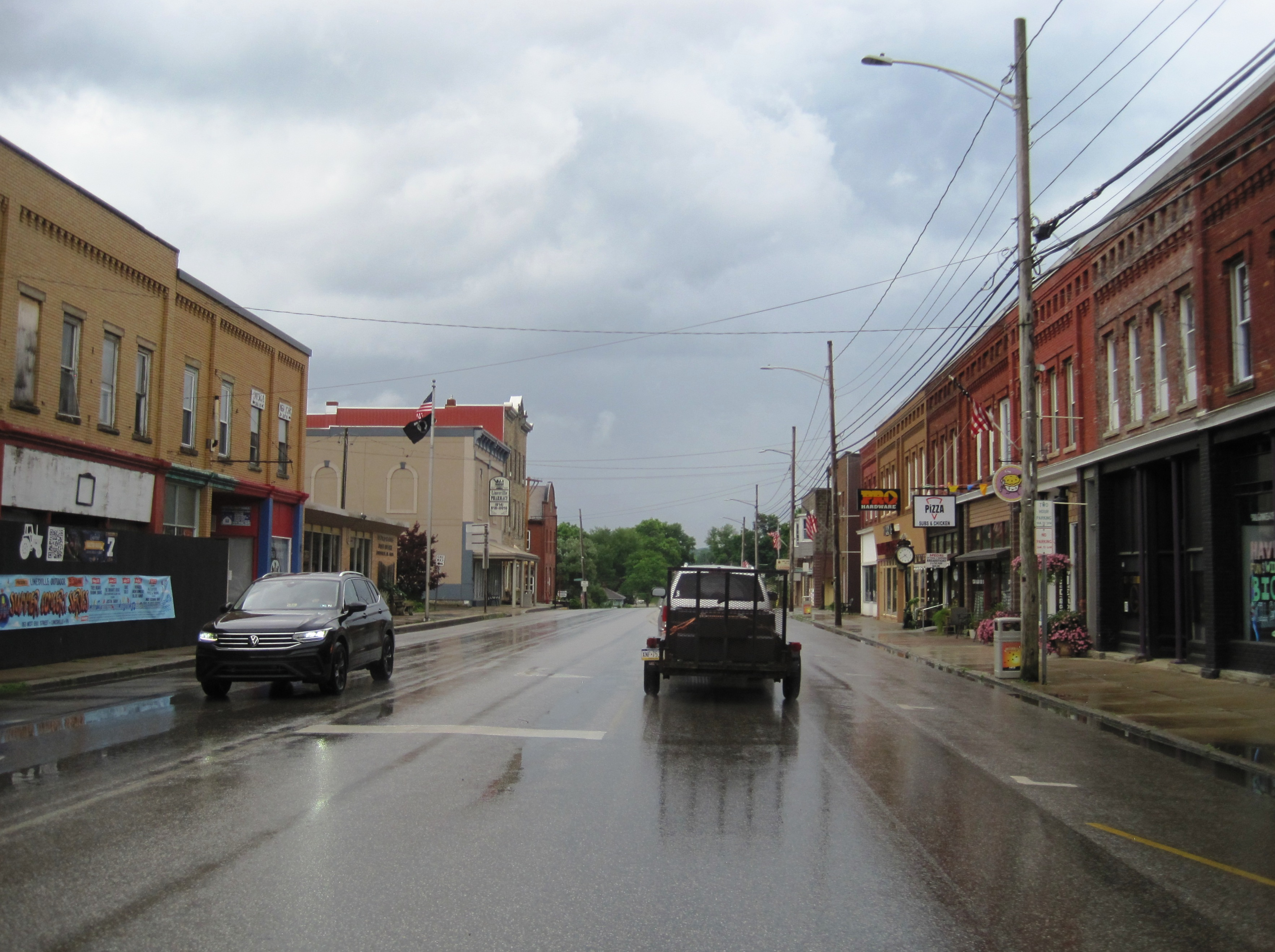
- West Erie Street (US 6) in downtown Linesville
- Nickname: Where the Ducks Walk on the Fish
- Location of Linesville in Crawford County, Pennsylvania

- Location of Linesville in Pennsylvania
- Coordinates: 41°39′23″N 80°25′28″W
- Country: United States
- State: Pennsylvania
- County: Crawford
- Founded: 1824

Government
  - Mayor: Christopher Seeley (D)

Area
  - Total: 0.78 sq mi (2.01 km^{2})
  - Land: 0.78 sq mi (2.01 km^{2})
  - Water: 0 sq mi (0.00 km^{2})
- Elevation (middle of borough): 1,050 ft (320 m)
- Highest elevation (northeast corner of borough): 1,117 ft (340 m)
- Lowest elevation (Pymatuning Lake): 1,008 ft (307 m)

Population (2020)
  - Total: 961
  - Estimate (2022): 947
  - Density: 1,242.5/sq mi (479.72/km^{2})
- Time zone: UTC-4 (EST)
  - Summer (DST): UTC-5 (EDT)
- ZIP code: 16424
- Area code: 814
- FIPS code: 42-43656
- Website: https://linesvilleboro.org/

Linesville is a borough in Crawford County, Pennsylvania, United States. Its population was 961 at the 2020 census, down from 987 at the 2019 census. The town derives its name from its founders, who included William Line (the grandson of a Swiss immigrant), who migrated from Carlisle, Pennsylvania, circa the early 1820s, and his relative, Amos Line, who was the town's surveyor and main proprietor. Amos Line "penetrated the western Pennsylvania wilderness as a member of the Pennsylvania Population Company in the early 1800s."

== History ==
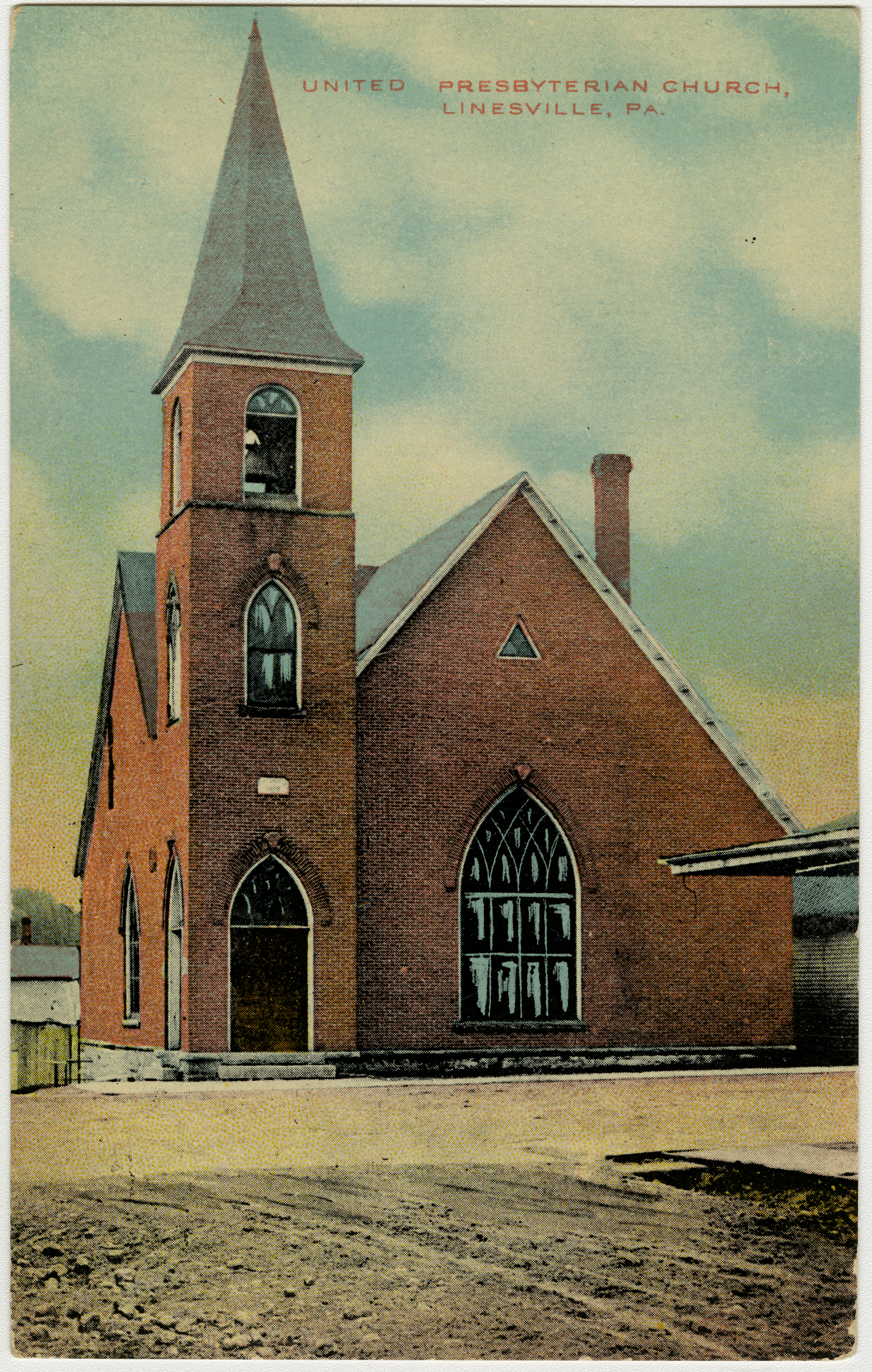
Presbyterian Church on an old postcard

According to the town's history, Linesville was settled by Amos Line, who was born in Scotch Plains, New Jersey. "Line established a mill at the site in 1820. The village was laid out in 1825. It was first known as Line's Mills, but the name was changed to Linesville Station in 1864. It was not known as Linesville until 1883. It was incorporated from Pine Township on March 22, 1862.

== Geography ==
Linesville is located in western Crawford County at 41°39′23″N 80°25′28″W (41.656489, -80.424430). It is surrounded by Pine Township, a separate municipality.

According to the United States Census Bureau, the borough has a total area of 0.77 square miles (2.0 km^{2}), all land. The borough is located just north of the northeast end of Pymatuning Reservoir.

U.S. Route 6 passes through the center of Linesville, leading east 17 miles (27 km) to Meadville, the Crawford County seat, and northwest then south 16 miles (26 km) to Andover, Ohio. South Mercer Street provides a shorter route to Andover [10 miles (16 km)], leading south across the Linesville Spillway of Pymatuning Lake to Pennsylvania Route 285.

=== Climate ===
Climate data for Linesville, Pennsylvania (1991–2020 normals, extremes 1940–present)
Month	Jan	Feb	Mar	Apr	May	Jun	Jul	Aug	Sep	Oct	Nov	Dec	Year
Record high °F (°C)	67 (19)	73 (23)	82 (28)	87 (31)	92 (33)	98 (37)	101 (38)	99 (37)	99 (37)	86 (30)	79 (26)	69 (21)	101 (38)
Mean daily maximum °F (°C)	31.9 (−0.1)	34.4 (1.3)	43.1 (6.2)	56.8 (13.8)	68.2 (20.1)	76.7 (24.8)	80.5 (26.9)	79.1 (26.2)	73.0 (22.8)	60.4 (15.8)	47.8 (8.8)	37.0 (2.8)	57.4 (14.1)
Daily mean °F (°C)	24.4 (−4.2)	25.6 (−3.6)	34.0 (1.1)	46.4 (8.0)	57.7 (14.3)	66.7 (19.3)	70.7 (21.5)	69.2 (20.7)	62.8 (17.1)	51.2 (10.7)	40.2 (4.6)	30.6 (−0.8)	48.3 (9.1)
Mean daily minimum °F (°C)	17.0 (−8.3)	16.8 (−8.4)	25.0 (−3.9)	36.0 (2.2)	47.3 (8.5)	56.7 (13.7)	60.8 (16.0)	59.3 (15.2)	52.6 (11.4)	41.9 (5.5)	32.5 (0.3)	24.2 (−4.3)	39.2 (4.0)
Record low °F (°C)	−28 (−33)	−27 (−33)	−21 (−29)	8 (−13)	16 (−9)	26 (−3)	34 (1)	31 (−1)	21 (−6)	16 (−9)	5 (−15)	−21 (−29)	−28 (−33)
Average precipitation inches (mm)	2.91 (74)	2.02 (51)	2.67 (68)	3.62 (92)	3.82 (97)	4.74 (120)	4.45 (113)	3.62 (92)	4.10 (104)	3.73 (95)	3.18 (81)	3.17 (81)	42.03 (1,068)
Average snowfall inches (cm)	20.2 (51)	11.6 (29)	8.9 (23)	2.0 (5.1)	0.0 (0.0)	0.0 (0.0)	0.0 (0.0)	0.0 (0.0)	0.0 (0.0)	0.0 (0.0)	3.9 (9.9)	17.4 (44)	64.0 (163)
Average precipitation days (≥ 0.01 in)	17.8	14.1	13.6	13.9	13.5	13.5	12.2	11.3	11.2	14.5	14.2	16.8	166.6
Average snowy days (≥ 0.1 in)	8.9	6.4	3.9	1.0	0.0	0.0	0.0	0.0	0.0	0.0	2.1	6.8	29.1
Source: NOAA

== Demographics ==
Historical population
Census	Pop.	Note	%±
1870	434		—
1880	550		26.7%
1890	552		0.4%
1900	661		19.7%
1910	833		26.0%
1920	1,015		21.8%
1930	963		−5.1%
1940	1,150		19.4%
1950	1,246		8.3%
1960	1,255		0.7%
1970	1,265		0.8%
1980	1,198		−5.3%
1990	1,166		−2.7%
2000	1,155		−0.9%
2010	1,040		−10.0%
2020	962		−7.5%
2022 (est.)	947	▼	−1.6%

As of the 2000 census, 1,155 people, 470 households, and 306 families were residing in the borough. The population density was 1,510.4 inhabitants per square mile (583.2/km^{2}). The 501 housing units had an average density of 655.2 per square mile (253.0/km^{2}). The Race (U.S. Census)racial makeup of the borough was 97.23% White, 0.69% African American, 0.69% Native American, 0.26% Asian, and 1.13% from two or more races. Hispanics or Latino of any race were 0.69% of the population.

Of the 470 households, 29.4% had children under 18 living with them, 46.0% were married couples living together, 12.1% had a female householder with no husband present, and 34.7% were not families. About 28.5% of all households were made up of individuals, and 18.7% had someone living alone who was 65 or older. The average household size was 2.45 and the average family size was 2.99.

In the borough, the age distribution was 26.7% under 18, 5.7% from 18 to 24, 25.9% from 25 to 44, 20.9% from 45 to 64, and 20.9% who were 65 or older. The median age was 40.0 years. For every 100 females, there were 100.5 males. For every 100 females 18 and over, there were 90.8 males.

The median income for a household in the borough was $30,938, and for a family was $34,038. Males had a median income of $31,296 versus $21,719 for females. The per capita income for the borough was $15,534. About 9.4% of families and 14.4% of the population were below the poverty line, including 20.8% of those under age 18 and 12.4% of those age 65 or over.

Linesville is within the Conneaut School District and is home to the district's administration offices, along with the Conneaut Area Senior High School and the Alice Shafer Annex.

== Points of interest ==
Several points of interest are located throughout the town, chiefly Pymatuning Lake and the Linesville Spillway. In warm weather, the spillway on the sanctuary (eastern) side is home to thousands of oversized carp, attracted by the bread thrown into the water by visitors; this is known as the "Place Where the Ducks Walk on the Fish", coined by local businessman Alpine Maclaine. The spillway is locally billed as "Pennsylvania's second-most popular tourist attraction, after the Liberty Bell", and the logo of the Linesville Volunteer Fire Department used to be a duck standing on the back of a fish.

Pymatuning Lake is one of the largest man-made lakes in Pennsylvania. It was created in the 1930s as a Great Depression-era Civilian Conservation Corps project. Linesville is also home to the University of Pittsburgh's Pymatuning Laboratory of Ecology.

Linesville is the birthplace of noteworthy traveler Winfield Line (Amos Line's great-great-grandson), who in 1922-23 with his brother Francis, hiked/hitchhiked through every state in the Union. These brothers later wrote a book entitled Foot by Foot Through the USA, A High Adventure Odyssey to Every State in the Union, which chronicled their journey.

Another minor point of interest is at the main intersection of the town (at its sole traffic light). On the Maclaine Building at the northwest corner is a sign reading "CHICAGO: 500 miles NEW YORK: 500 miles" (the true midpoint between the two is actually about a mile west).

At one time, Linesville was the onion capital of the United States, distributing its fragrant produce via the Erie and Pittsburgh Branch of the Pennsylvania Railroad.

Linesville made national news in November 2005 when 18-year-old Christopher Seeley was elected mayor, one of the youngest mayors to serve in a U.S. city to date.
