= Pennsylvania House of Representatives, District 6 =

American legislative district

Pennsylvania's 6th State House of Representatives district
Representative
Bradley T. Roae; R–Meadville
- Population (2022): 64,059

The 6th Pennsylvania House of Representatives District is located in northwestern Pennsylvania and has been represented since 2007 by Bradley T. Roae.

== District profile ==
The 6th Pennsylvania House of Representatives District is located in Crawford County and Erie County and includes the following areas:

Crawford County

- Beaver Township
- Cochranton
- Conneaut Lake
- Conneaut Township
- Conneautville
- East Fairfield Township
- East Fallowfield Township
- East Mead Township
- Fairfield Township
- Greenwood Township
- Hayfield Township
- Linesville
- Meadville
- North Shenango Township
- Pine Township
- Randolph Township
- Sadsbury Township
- South Shenango Township
- Spring Township
- Springboro
- Summerhill Township
- Summit Township
- Union Township
- Vernon Township
- Wayne Township
- West Fallowfield Township
- West Mead Township
- West Shenango Township

Erie County

- Albion
- Conneaut Township
- Cranesville
- Elk Creek Township
- Springfield

== Representatives ==
Representative	Party	Years	District home	Notes
Prior to 1969, seats were apportioned by county.
R. Budd Dwyer	Republican	1969 – 1970	Meadville	Moved from the Crawford County district.
H. Harrison Haskell	Republican	1971 – 1978	Titusville	Did not run for re-election.
Tom Swift	Republican	1979 – 1986	Cambridge Springs	Defeated in primary election.
Connie Maine	Democrat	1987 – 1990	Townville	Defeated in general election.
Teresa E. Forcier	Republican	1991 – 2006	Cambridge Springs	Defeated in primary election.
Brad Roae	Republican	2007 – present	Meadville	Incumbent

== Recent election results ==
PA House election, 2024: Pennsylvania House, District 6
Party	Candidate	Votes	%
Republican	Brad Roae (incumbent)	22,655	70.08
Democratic	Michael Walker	9,671	29.92
Total votes		32,326	100.00
Republican hold			

PA House election, 2022: Pennsylvania House, District 6
Party	Candidate	Votes	%
Republican	Brad Roae (incumbent)	17,610	68.61
Democratic	Nerissa Galt	8,056	31.39
Total votes		25,666	100.00
Republican hold			

PA House election, 2020: Pennsylvania House, District 6
Party	Candidate	Votes	%
Republican	Brad Roae (incumbent)	21,285	65.35
Democratic	Matthew Ferrence	11,286	34.65
Total votes		32,571	100.00
Republican hold			

PA House election, 2018: Pennsylvania House, District 6
Party	Candidate	Votes	%
Republican	Brad Roae (incumbent)	Unopposed	
Total votes		17,735	100.00
Republican hold			

PA House election, 2016: Pennsylvania House, District 6
Party	Candidate	Votes	%
Republican	Brad Roae (incumbent)	17,197	60.00
Democratic	Peter Andrew Zimmer	11,467	40.00
Total votes		28,664	100.00
Republican hold			
