= Crawford Central School District =

School district in Pennsylvania

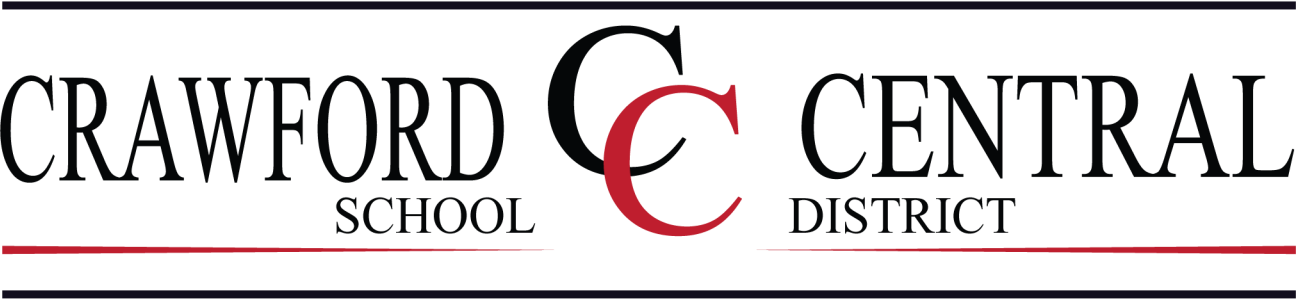

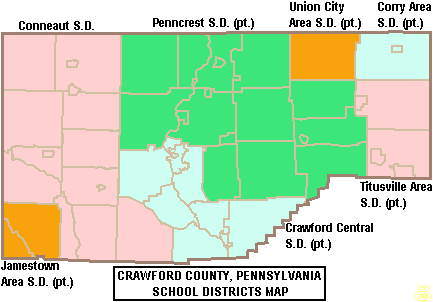
- District map

Address
- 11280 Mercer Pike Meadville, Crawford County, Pennsylvania, 16335; United States

District information
- Type: Public

Other information
- Website: craw.org

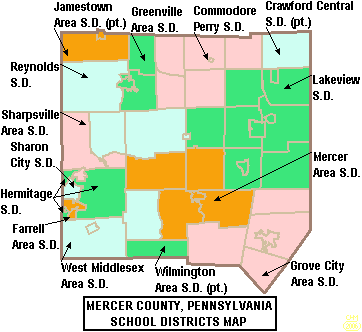
Crawford Central School District region in Mercer County

The Crawford Central School District is a midsized, public school district in Crawford County, Pennsylvania. It serves the City of Meadville, Borough of Cochranton and East Fairfield Township, Fairfield Township, Union Township, Vernon Township, Wayne Township and West Mead Township as well as a small portion of Greenwood Township in Crawford County, Pennsylvania, as well as French Creek Township in neighboring Mercer County, Pennsylvania. Crawford Central School District encompasses approximately 156 square miles. According to 2000 federal census data, it serves a resident population of 30,882 people. By 2010, the district's population declined to 30,635 people. In 2009, the Crawford Central School District residents' per capita income was $18,463, while the median family income was $43,771. In the Commonwealth, the median family income was $49,501 and the United States median family income was $49,445, in 2010. By 2013, the median household income in the United States rose to $52,100.

== Schools ==
- Meadville Area Senior High School (grades 9–12)
- Cochranton Junior/Senior High School (grades 7–12)
- Meadville Area Middle School (grades 7–8)
- First District Elementary School (grades K–6)
- Second District Elementary School (grades K–6)
- West End Elementary School (grades K–6)
- Neason Hill Elementary School (grades K–6)
- Cochranton Area Elementary School (grades K–6)

== Extracurriculars ==
Crawford Central School District offers a variety of clubs, activities and an extensive sports program.

=== Sports ===
The district runs duplicate teams due to having 2 high schools. The programs are uneven in that Meadville Schools have far more sports offered, alongside many clubs. Zachary Cowher is the head of CCSD's sports administration. Crawford Central School District is in PIAA District ten.

The District funds:

Boys

- Baseball
- Bowling
- Cross Country
- Football
- Golf
- Lacrosse
- Soccer
- Swimming and Diving
- Tennis
- Track and Field
- Volleyball
- Wrestling - AAA

Girls

- Basketball
- Bowling
- Cross Country
- Golf
- Soccer (Fall)
- Swimming and Diving
- Girls' Tennis
- Track and Field
- Volleyball

Middle School/Junior High School Sports

Boys

- Basketball
- Cross Country
- Football
- Track and Field
- Wrestling

Girls

- Basketball
- Cross Country
- Track and Field
- Volleyball

According to PIAA directory July 2013
