= Custards, Pennsylvania =

Unincorporated community in Pennsylvania, US

- Unincorporated settlement
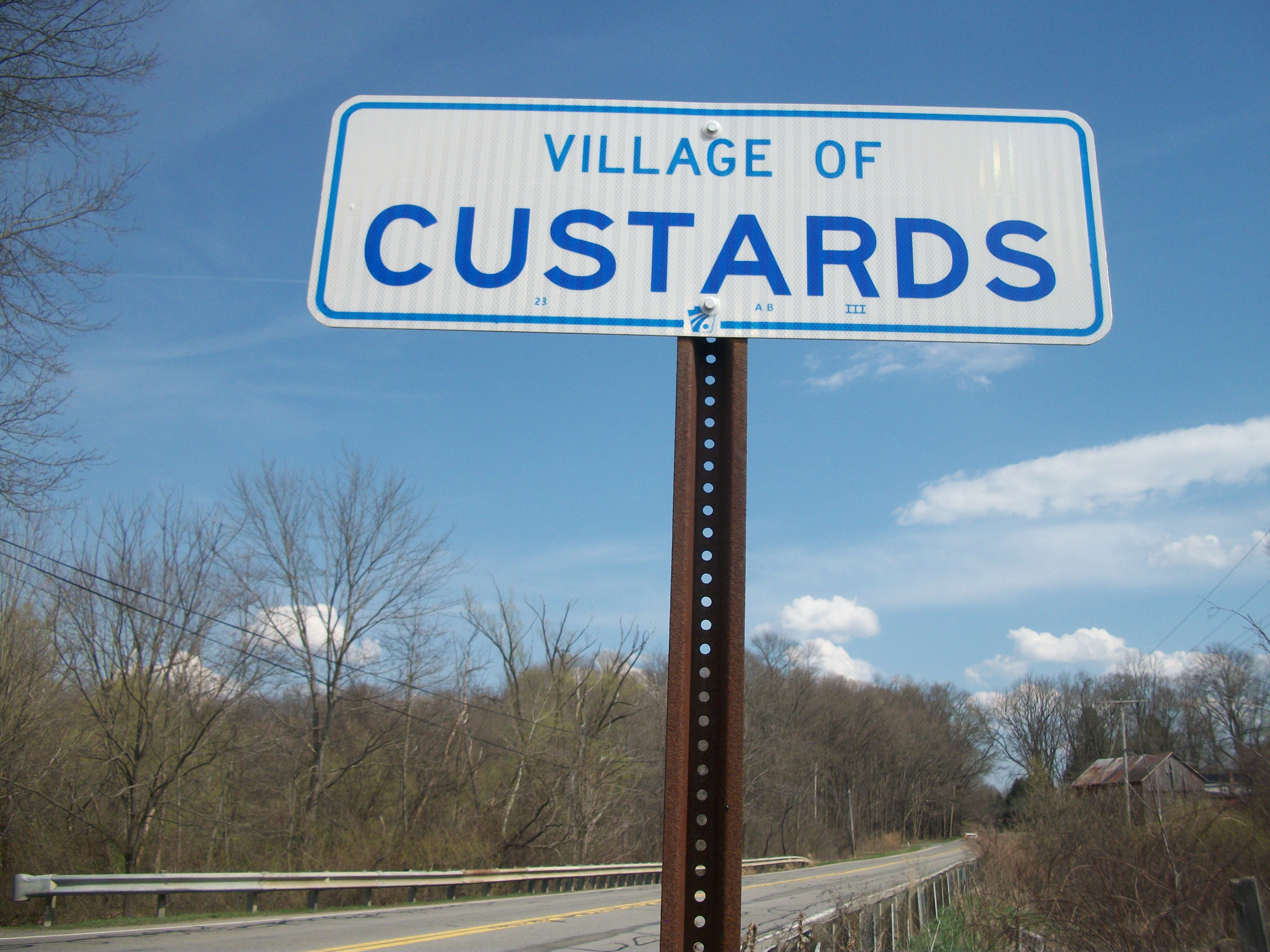
- Village of Custards sign

- Location within Pennsylvania
- Coordinates: 41°31′49″N 80°09′33″W
- Country: United States
- State: Pennsylvania
- County: Crawford
- Townships: Greenwood, Fairfield
- Elevation: 1,089 ft (332 m)
- Time zone: UTC-5 (Eastern (EST))
  - Summer (DST): UTC-4 (EDT)
- Area code: 814
- GNIS feature ID: 1172870

Custards is an unincorporated community in Greenwood Township, Crawford County, Pennsylvania, United States. Custards is located on Pennsylvania Route 285, west of Cochranton and is near Interstate 79 and U.S. Route 19.

== History ==
According to the author Robert Waites, the name may have been due to Benjamin Custard, who in 1788 received a 300-acre (120 ha; 1,200,000 m^{2}) land grant, which he'd called Custard's Delight. Another possible name origin was put forth by two Crawford County historians, who stated that the community was named for Richard Custard, who settled in the area in 1797.

From about 1810 to 1830 Richard Custard ran the Black Horse Tavern.

During the 1880s Custards had two harness shops, two blacksmith shops, two general stores, a steam-and-water powered gristmill and sawmill, as well as several dwellings.

== Former post office ==
Custards' first post office was established in 1838, but was later discontinued. In 1849 the post office was re-established, and operated until being discontinued in 1902.
