= Forcier =

Forcier is a surname. Notable people with the surname include:

- André Forcier (born 1947), Canadian film director and screenwriter
- Chad Forcier, American basketball coach
- Tate Forcier (born 1990), American football player
- Teresa Forcier (born 1953), American politician
- Justin Forcier (born 1986), American attorney
- Troy Forcier (born 1967), Canadian Psychotherapist, Guitarist for the Rhododendron Boys
