= Brad Roae =

American politician (born 1967)

Bradley T. Roae

Member of the Pennsylvania House of Representatives from the 6th district
- Incumbent
- Assumed office January 2, 2007
- Preceded by: Teresa Forcier

Personal details
- Born: April 6, 1967 (age 59) Meadville, Pennsylvania, U.S.
- Party: Republican
- Spouse: Dana Roae
- Education: Gannon University
- Website: www.reproae.com

Bradley T. Roae (/ˈrɔɪ/ ROY) (born April 6, 1967) is a Republican member of the Pennsylvania House of Representatives, representing the 6th legislative district, which consists of parts of Crawford County. He was first elected in 2006.

== Education and early career ==
Roae attended Gannon University, graduating in 1990. He then worked a commercial underwriter for Erie Insurance, while holding several part-time jobs early in his career, in order to pay down his student loan debts. He is an EMT and a volunteer firefighter with the East Mead Volunteer Fire Department.

== Political career ==
Following the 2005 Pennsylvania General Assembly pay raise controversy, Roae successfully challenged 15-year incumbent Teresa Forcier, campaigning on a promise to leave office after two terms. Roae then went on to defeat Democrat Keith Abbott in the general election. Upon taking his seat, Roae was appointed to the newly formed Speaker's Commission on Legislative Reform. He refuses to use the legislature's taxpayer-funded mass-mailing "newsletters" and public service announcements. Initially, he claimed he would decline to use a vehicle from the legislature's taxpayer-funded fleet, the $152 per diem, and did not keep the legislature's automatic annual Cost Of Living Adjustment. According to a 2015 article by the Erie Times News though, while his expenses were the lowest among local lawmakers, he spent $13,323 during the previous two-year period.

After the 2020 Presidential election, Brad Roae was one of 26 Pennsylvania House Republicans who called for withdrawing certification of presidential electors, despite there being no evidence of fraud, and despite Joe Biden winning Pennsylvania by over 80,000 votes. Federal appeals brought by the Trump campaign were dismissed due to lack of evidence.

== Committee assignments ==
Republican chair of the State Government Committee

- Commerce, chair
- Health
