= Connie Maine =

American politician (born 1942)

Connie G. Maine

Member of the Pennsylvania House of Representatives from the 6th district
- In office January 4, 1987 – November 30, 1990
- Preceded by: Tom Swift
- Succeeded by: Teresa Forcier

Personal details
- Born: Connie Glott; October 28, 1942 (age 83) Brownsville, Pennsylvania, United States
- Party: Democratic
- Education: Indiana University of Pennsylvania (BS) (MA)

Constance "Connie" G. Maine (born October 28, 1942) is an American former politician and Democratic member of the Pennsylvania House of Representatives.

== Formative years ==
Born as Connie Glott in Brownsville, Pennsylvania on October 28, 1942, Connie Maine is a daughter of Dr. and Mrs. Ralph Glott of Indiana, Pennsylvania. She graduated from California High School in 1960 and attended California State College from 1960 to 1962, obtaining a bachelor's degree in education from Indiana State College in 1964. After conducting graduate work at the University of Pittsburgh and Pennsylvania State University, Maine obtained a masters in community studies from Indiana University of Pennsylvania in 1986.

Maine worked primarily in education, first as a teacher and school counselor. She worked as director at the Meadville Center for Families in Change and as a lecturer and author.

== Legislative and public service career ==
In 1986, Maine was elected to the first of two terms to the Pennsylvania House of Representatives and in 1990 was appointed chair of the Select Committee on Domestic Violence and Rape Crisis Services in Pennsylvania. She was defeated in her reelection bid in 1990.

After her career in the House of Representatives, Maine worked as a communication consultant and as a member of the Pennsylvania Commission for Women (1990–1992) and Pennsylvania Historical and Museum Commission (1993–1995).
