= Randy Fichtner =

American football coach (born 1963)

Personal information
- Born: November 7, 1963 (age 62); Cleveland, Ohio, U.S.

Career information
- High school: Meadville (PA) Area Senior
- College: Purdue
- NFL draft: 1986: undrafted

Career history
- Michigan (1986–1987) Graduate assistant; USC (1988) Graduate assistant; UNLV (1989) Graduate assistant; Memphis (1990–1993) Quarterbacks Coach; Purdue (1994–1996) Wide receivers coach & recruiting director; Arkansas State (1997–2000) Offensive coordinator; Memphis (2001–2006) Offensive coordinator & quarterbacks coach; Pittsburgh Steelers (2007–2009) Wide receivers coach; Pittsburgh Steelers (2010–2017) Quarterbacks coach; Pittsburgh Steelers (2018–2019) Offensive coordinator & quarterbacks coach; Pittsburgh Steelers (2020) Offensive coordinator

Awards and highlights
- Super Bowl champion (XLIII)
- Coaching profile at Pro Football Reference

Randy Fichtner (born November 7, 1963) is an American football coach. He spent 14 seasons as a part of the Pittsburgh Steelers' coaching staff from 2007 to 2020. He most recently served as their offensive coordinator, a position he held for three seasons.

== Early life ==
Fichtner, a native of Cleveland, Ohio, was a standout football player at Meadville Area Senior High School in Meadville, Pennsylvania. He chose to attend Purdue University, playing defensive back for the Boilermakers. His father is Ross Fichtner, who played quarterback for Purdue, and then played defensive back for the Cleveland Browns.

== Coaching career ==
=== College ===
Fichtner began his coaching career as a graduate assistant, serving with Michigan, USC, UNLV, and Memphis from 1986–1987, 1988, 1989, and 1990–1993 respectively. He earned the positions of wide receivers coach and recruiting director at Purdue in 1994, serving for two years before moving to Arkansas State to become the offensive coordinator from 1997–2001. Under Fichtner's tutelage, quarterback Cleo Lemon flourished, setting numerous school records for passing and total offense. Fichtner returned to Memphis in 2001 to serve as offensive coordinator and quarterbacks coach, instituting a new, highly effective spread offense that set school records for total offense. The new system allowed the teams to amass prolific offensive statistics, totalling over 5,000 yards in both 2003 and 2004 to rank in the top ten for both yardage and scoring, as well as supporting the development of quarterback Danny Wimprine and running back DeAngelo Williams.

=== Pittsburgh Steelers ===
In 2007, Fichtner was hired by the Pittsburgh Steelers as their wide receivers coach under head coach Mike Tomlin, replacing the promoted Bruce Arians. He was instrumental in the development of the Steelers young wide receiver corps, mentoring Santonio Holmes to multiple 1000-yard seasons and a Super Bowl MVP award as well as supporting the growth of emerging wideouts Mike Wallace, Emmanuel Sanders, and Antonio Brown. In 2010, Fichtner was promoted to quarterbacks coach, replacing Ken Anderson after Anderson's retirement. On January 18, 2018, Fichtner was promoted to offensive coordinator while retaining his role as quarterbacks coach following the non-renewal of Todd Haley's contract with the team, announced by Mike Tomlin the previous day. Following the Steelers' hiring of Matt Canada as quarterbacks coach on January 15, 2020, Fichtner dropped his title of QBs coach while remaining in place as offensive coordinator. Fichtner's contract was not renewed after the end of the 2020 season following a playoff loss to the Cleveland Browns.
