= Todd Erdos =

American baseball player (born 1973)

- Pitcher
- Born: November 21, 1973 (age 52); Washington, Pennsylvania, U.S.
- Batted: Right Threw: Right

MLB debut
- June 8, 1997, for the San Diego Padres

Last MLB appearance
- October 5, 2001, for the Boston Red Sox

MLB statistics
- Win–loss record: 2–0
- Earned run average: 5.57
- Strikeouts: 58
- Stats at Baseball Reference

Teams
- San Diego Padres (1997, 2000); New York Yankees (1998–2000); Boston Red Sox (2001)

Todd Michael Erdos (born November 21, 1973) is an American former middle-relief pitcher in Major League Baseball who played for the San Diego Padres, New York Yankees and Boston Red Sox in a span of six seasons from 1997 to 2001. Listed at 6' 1", 205 lb., Erdos batted and threw right-handed. He was born in Washington, Pennsylvania.

The Padres selected Erdos in the 9th round of the 1992 MLB draft out of the Meadville Area Senior High School in Pennsylvania, where he played for the Bulldog baseball team.

== Career ==
In a five-season career, Erdos posted a 2–0 record with a 5.57 earned run average and two saves in 63 pitching appearances, including 58 strikeouts, 45 walks, 21 games finished, and 93 1/3 innings of work.

Following his majors career, Erdos played in the International League from 2002 through 2004 with the Pawtucket Red Sox, Rochester Red Wings and Indianapolis Indians, before joining the Long Island Ducks of the Atlantic League from 2005 to 2006. Erdos had a record of 5–5 in his two seasons for the Ducks while registering a club record 40 saves and a 4.28 ERA in 86 1/3 innings, earning a berth in the AL All-Star team in the 2005 season. During the 2006 midseason, Long Island announced that his contract had been purchased by the Brother Elephants of the Chinese League.

In between, Erdos played winter ball for the Navegantes del Magallanes and Tigres de Aragua clubs of the Venezuelan League in part of five seasons from 2000–01 to 2005–06.

In 2011, Erdos was named head coach for the baseball team of Butler High School in Pennsylvania, where former big leaguer Milt Graff have coached their baseball team. At the time, Erdos rejoined Matt Clement, also a former Major League pitcher who coached the school's basketball team. They had been teammates in the Padres minor league system as well, making the school a rarity in having two former major leaguers as coaches at the same time.
