= Tom Swift (politician) =

American politician

Member of the Pennsylvania House of Representatives from the 6th district
- In office January 2, 1979 – November 30, 1986
- Preceded by: Harison Haskell
- Succeeded by: Connie Maine

Personal details
- Born: October 17, 1944 (age 81) Meadville, Pennsylvania, United States
- Party: Republican
- Education: Edinboro State College (BS); University of South Carolina (MS)

Charles Thomas Swift (born October 17, 1944) is a former Republican member of the Pennsylvania House of Representatives who served the 6th district from 1979 to 1986.

== Biography ==
Born in Meadville, Pennsylvania in 1944, Swift attended local area schools and obtained a bachelors degree from Edinboro State College in 1965 and a masters degree from the University of South Carolina in 1971. Swift served in the United States Army from 1968 to 1970.

Swift worked in a variety of professions, including as a teacher, investment salesman, and office manager. In 1978, Swift was elected to the Pennsylvania House of Representatives and served for four consecutive terms. He decided not to seek reelection in 1986 and retired from the position.
