= Geneva, Pennsylvania =

Unincorporated community in Pennsylvania, US

- Census-designated place
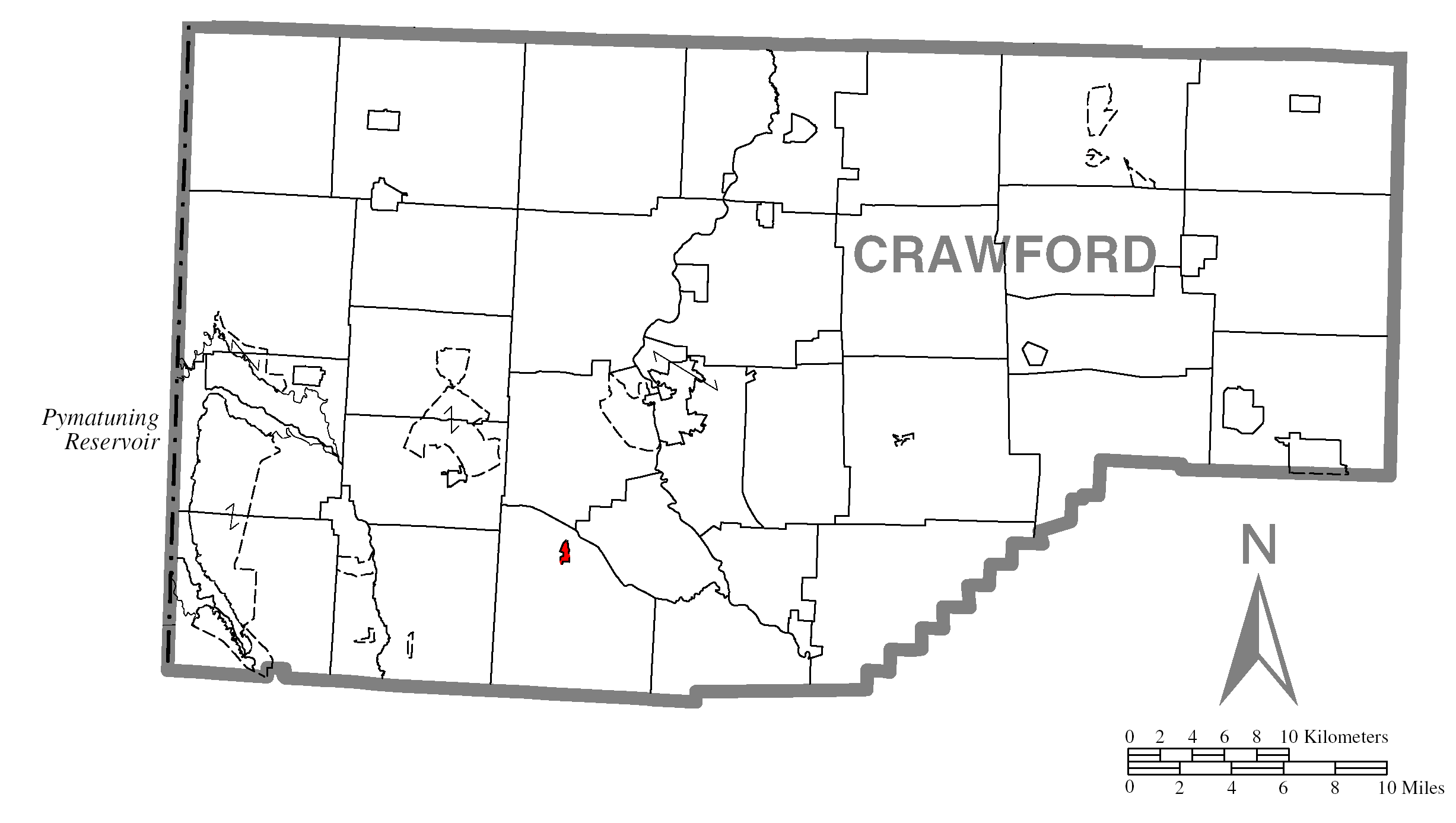
- Location of Geneva in Crawford County

- Location of Crawford County in Pennsylvania
- Coordinates: 41°33′42″N 80°13′35″W
- Country: United States
- State: Pennsylvania
- County: Crawford County
- Township: Greenwood

Area
  - Total: 0.22 sq mi (0.56 km^{2})
  - Land: 0.22 sq mi (0.56 km^{2})
  - Water: 0 sq mi (0.00 km^{2})
- Elevation: 1,134 ft (346 m)

Population (2020)
  - Total: 121
  - Density: 554.7/sq mi (214.19/km^{2})
- Time zone: UTC-4 (EST)
  - Summer (DST): UTC-5 (EDT)
- ZIP code: 16316
- Area code: 814
- FIPS code: 42-28768

Geneva is a census-designated place in Crawford County, Pennsylvania, United States. The population was 109 at the 2010 census.

== Geography ==
Geneva is located in southwestern Crawford County at 41°33′42″N 80°13′35″W (41.561797, -80.226310), in the northern part of Greenwood Township. Pennsylvania Route 285 passes through the community, leading southeast 3 miles (4.8 km) to Exit 141 on Interstate 79 and northwest 6 miles (10 km) to Conneaut Lake.

According to the United States Census Bureau, the CDP has a total area of 0.22 square miles (0.56 km^{2}), all land.

== Demographics ==
Historical population
Census	Pop.	Note	%±
2020	121		—
U.S. Decennial Census

As of the census of 2000, there were 115 people, 48 households, and 36 families residing in the CDP. The population density was 529.2 inhabitants per square mile (204.3/km^{2}). There were 50 housing units at an average density of 230.1 per square mile (88.8/km^{2}). The racial makeup of the CDP was 100.00% White.

There were 48 households, out of which 22.9% had children under the age of 18 living with them, 66.7% were married couples living together, 6.3% had a female householder with no husband present, and 25.0% were non-families. 22.9% of all households were made up of individuals, and 6.3% had someone living alone who was 65 years of age or older. The average household size was 2.40 and the average family size was 2.78.

In the CDP, the population was spread out, with 20.9% under the age of 18, 8.7% from 18 to 24, 26.1% from 25 to 44, 28.7% from 45 to 64, and 15.7% who were 65 years of age or older. The median age was 40 years. For every 100 females, there were 105.4 males. For every 100 females age 18 and over, there were 97.8 males.

The median income for a household in the CDP was $33,958, and the median income for a family was $36,875. Males had a median income of $29,375 versus $17,083 for females. The per capita income for the CDP was $16,171. There were no families and 4.2% of the population living below the poverty line, including no under eighteens and 13.3% of those over 64.

== History ==
The community was originally known as Sutton's Corners. John Sutton and his son John S. Sutton settled in the area in 1803. By 1863 the name was changed to Geneva, after Geneva, Switzerland.
