= Frenchtown, Pennsylvania =

Unincorporated community in Pennsylvania, US

- Unincorporated settlement
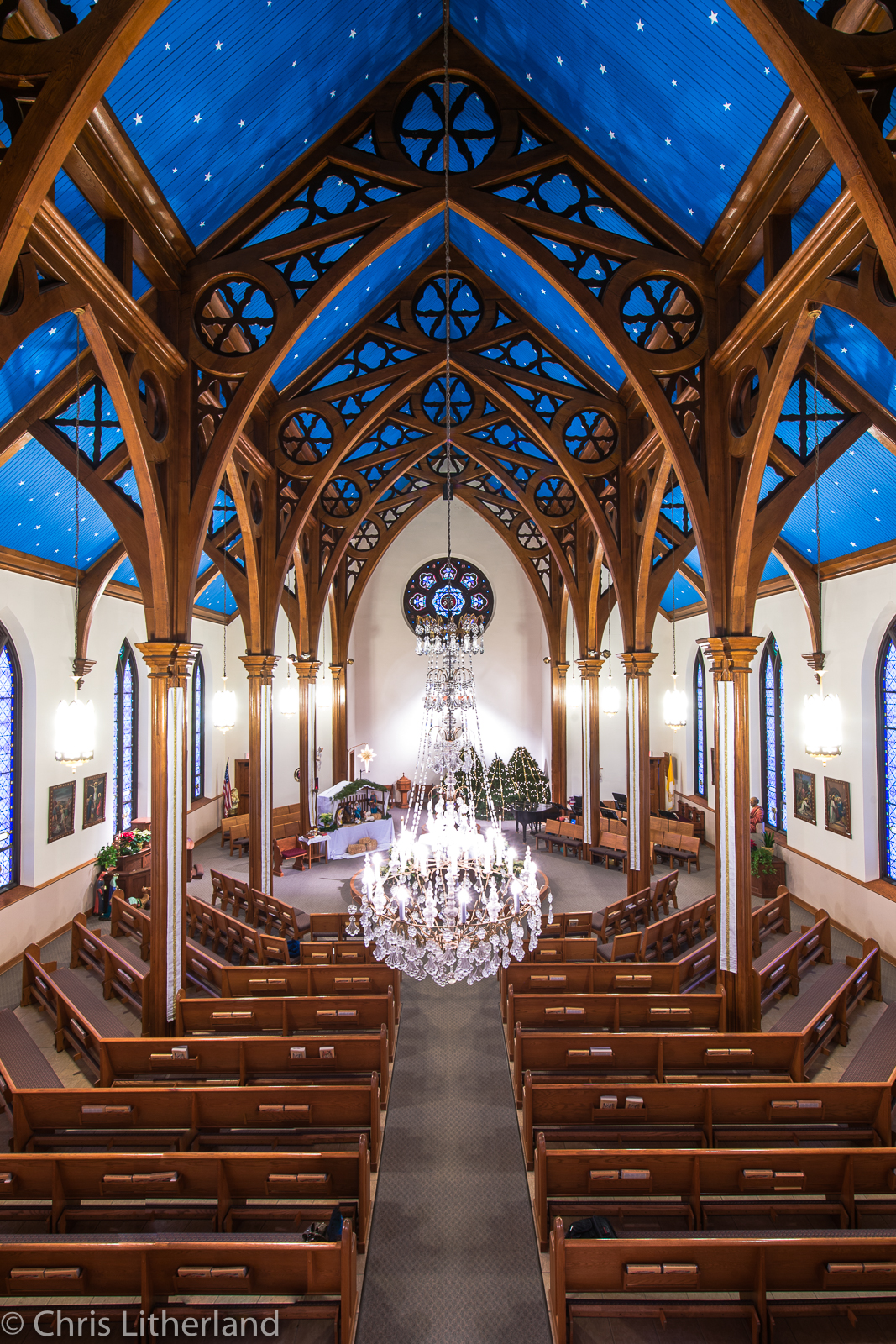
- Frenchtown Catholic Church, 2017

- Location within Pennsylvania
- Coordinates: 41°36′43″N 80°01′18″W
- Country: United States
- State: Pennsylvania
- County: Crawford
- Township: East Mead
- Elevation: 1,411 ft (430 m)
- Time zone: UTC-5 (Eastern (EST))
  - Summer (DST): UTC-4 (EDT)
- Area code: 814
- GNIS feature ID: 1175231

Frenchtown is an unincorporated community in Crawford County, Pennsylvania, United States. It is located in East Mead Township on Pennsylvania Route 27, east of Meadville.

== Settlement history ==
The settlement's first white settler was Alex Moultrip (or Moulthrop), a Revolutionary War soldier who, before 1800, had been given the land for his military service. He cleared land and built a cabin, but left after about a year. Beriah Battles came to the area in 1800, and the settlement became known as Moultrip. David Moulthrop purchased land from Battles in 1814.

The land came into the possession of the Holland Land Company, and Harm Jan Huidekoper was the land agent. Huidekoper advertised the land in Europe. Shortly after 1820 Catholic families from eastern France and Switzerland immigrated to the settlement, which later became known as Frenchtown.

== Frenchtown's church buildings ==
A wooden church was built in 1838, and in 1862 it was expanded and remodeled. In 1886 work was begun on the current church. The parishioners started their own brick factory, and they felled local trees to obtain lumber. The brick church was completed in 1888.

== Post office ==
A post office was established in 1869, but was discontinued in 1901.
