= H. Harrison Haskell =

American politician (1939–1990)

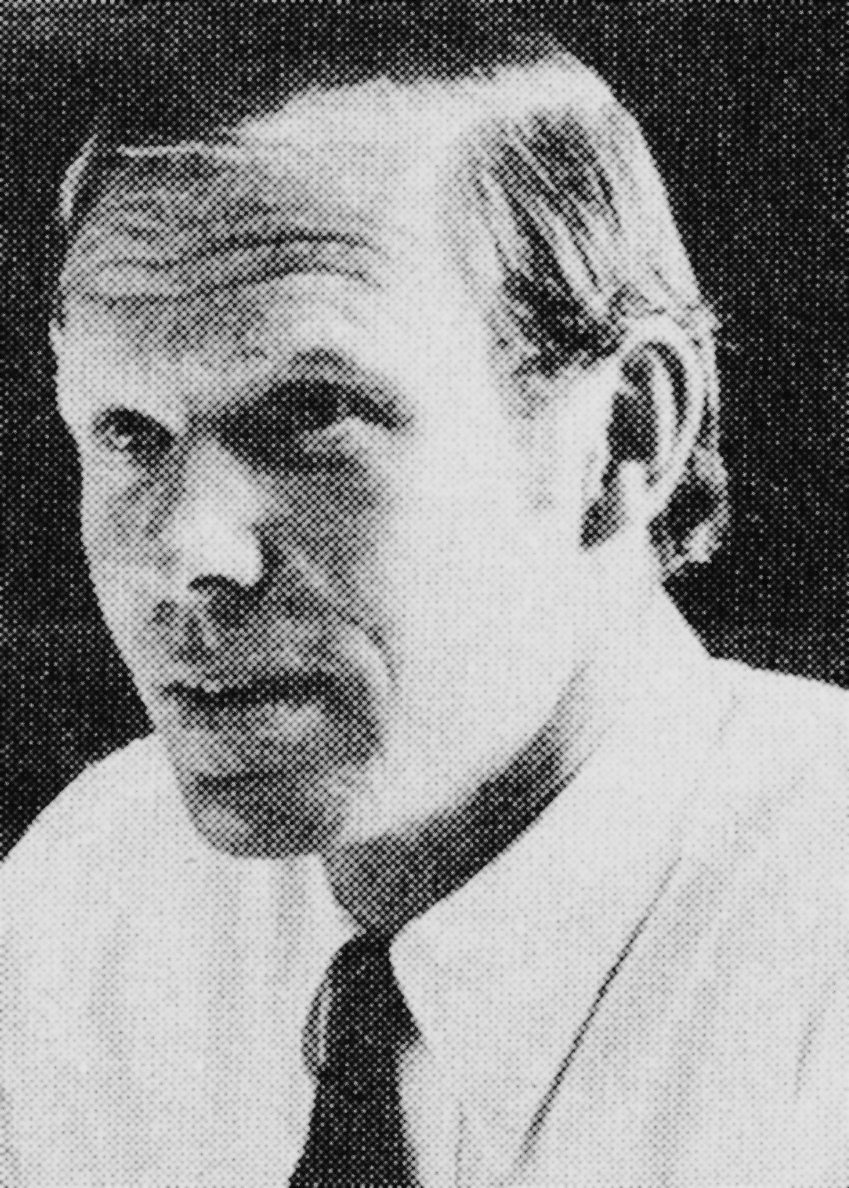
- Haskell, c. 1970s

Member of the Pennsylvania House of Representatives from the 6th district
- In office January 5, 1971 – November 30, 1978
- Preceded by: R. Budd Dwyer
- Succeeded by: Tom Swift

Personal details
- Born: December 4, 1939 Titusville, Pennsylvania, U.S.
- Died: July 28, 1990 (aged 50) Sebring, Florida, U.S.
- Party: Republican
- Education: Stetson University (BA)
- Occupation: Politician

Howard Harrison "Jay" Haskell II (December 4, 1939 – July 28, 1990) was an American politician. He was a Republican member of the Pennsylvania House of Representatives from the 6th district from 1971 to 1978.

== Biography ==
Howard Harrison Haskell II was born on December 4, 1939, in Titusville, Pennsylvania. He attended Titusville Area High School and Mercersburg Academy, graduating from Stetson University with a bachelor of arts and working on a masters degree. While at Stetson University, Haskell participated in the Reserve Officers' Training Corps program.

Haskell started his political career serving as an assistant to two U.S. Congressmen from Pennsylvania, James D. Weaver (1962–1964) and James G. Fulton (1963–1965). He later served as an assistant to the chair of the Pennsylvania Republican State Committee in 1966. From 1967 to 1970, Haskell worked as appointment secretary and assistant secretary for legislation to Governor Raymond P. Shafer.

Haskell was elected to the Pennsylvania House of Representatives from the 6th district in 1970, serving for three consecutive terms. He was elected as a delegate to the 1972 Republican National Convention. He was defeated in the 6th district Republican primary by Tom Swift in 1978.

On July 28, 1990, Haskell died in Sebring, Florida, at the age of 50. He was buried in Fairview Cemetery in Pleasantville, Pennsylvania.
