= Meadville Area Senior High School =

Public school in Pennsylvania, United States

Location
- 930 North Street Extension; Meadville, (Crawford County, Pennsylvania), Pennsylvania 16335; United States
- Coordinates: 41.6347°N 80.1284°W

Information
- Type: Public
- School district: Crawford Central School District
- Principal: John Higgans
- Teaching staff: 55.58 (FTE)
- Grades: 9–12
- Enrollment: 914 (2017–2018)
- Student to teacher ratio: 16.44
- Colors: Red and black
- Mascot: Bulldog
- Team name: Bulldogs
- Newspaper: The Bark
- Website: https://www.craw.org/apps/pages/index.jsp?uREC_ID=620016&type=d

Meadville Area Senior High School (MASH) is a public school located within the city of Meadville, Pennsylvania, United States. Situated at 930 North Street Ext., the high school serves the city of Meadville, West Mead Township, Vernon Township and is part of the Crawford Central School District. In the 2017–2018 school year, the total enrollment for grades 9 through 12 was 914.

The school's mascot is the bulldog and its colors are red and black.

== Extracurriculars ==
Students may participate in a wide range of clubs and organizations including student government, National Honor Society, ski club, marching band, jazz band, the school newspaper known as The Bark.

== Notable alumni ==
- Meghan Allen – adult model; Playboy Cyber Girl of the Month, appeared in Fear Factor
- Journey Brown – former running back at the Pennsylvania State University, MVP of the 2019 Cotton Bowl
- Todd Erdos – Major League Baseball player
- Randy Fichtner – offensive coordinator for the Pittsburgh Steelers
- Todd Holland – television and film director and producer
- Raymond P. Shafer – former Governor of Pennsylvania
- Michael S. Smith – jazz drummer and percussionist
