= Ohio State Route 85 =

State highway in Ashtabula County, Ohio, US

State Route 85

Route information
- Maintained by ODOT
- Length: 2.66 mi (4.28 km)
- Existed: 1923–present

Major junctions
- West end: US 6 / SR 7 in Andover
- East end: PA 285 near Andover

Location
- Country: United States
- State: Ohio
- Counties: Ashtabula

Highway system
- Ohio State Highway System; Interstate; US; State; Scenic
← SR 84	→ SR 86

State Route 85 (SR 85, OH 85) is an east–west state highway in the northeastern Ohio. The western terminus of SR 85 is in the center of Andover where it intersects U.S. Route 6 (US 6) and SR 7. Its eastern terminus is just over 2.5 miles (4.0 km) east of Andover at the Pennsylvania state line in the middle of the causeway across the Pymatuning Reservoir, where Pennsylvania Route 285 (PA 285) continues east.

The shortest of three state routes that lie completely within Ashtabula County, the current SR 85 is a fraction of the route it was when first designated in the mid-1920s, when it ran from Euclid to the Pennsylvania state line. When US 6 was designated in Ohio in the early 1930s, SR 85 was at first co-signed with the U.S. highway from Euclid to Andover, but by the late 1930s, the SR 85 shields were removed from this stretch of roadway, leaving just the stretch of highway that exists today.

== Route description ==
Traffic volume on State Route 85
County Log Point	Volume
0.03	6,660
1.00	4,340
2.016	3,180
Volume: AADT; Source:

The entirety of SR 85 is situated in the eastern portion of Ashtabula County. The route begins at an intersection with US 6 and SR 7 at a rectangular traffic circle that encircles Andover Township Park in downtown Andover. The two-lane state highway, which runs generally due east for its entire length, departs from the intersection and passes through a primarily commercial stretch of roadway to the point where it crosses the village limits of Andover, and enters into Andover Township. The tree-lined highway passes a mix of businesses and residences before reaching a signalized intersection with Pymatuning Lake Road, a road that follows the western edge of the Pymatuning Reservoir and connects SR 85 with the facilities of Pymatuning State Park. East of the traffic light, SR 85 traverses the causeway which crosses the middle of the Pymatuning Reservoir. Approximately halfway across the causeway, the roadway hits the Pennsylvania state line. At that point, SR 85 comes to an end, and PA 285 picks up the rest of the route across the causeway.

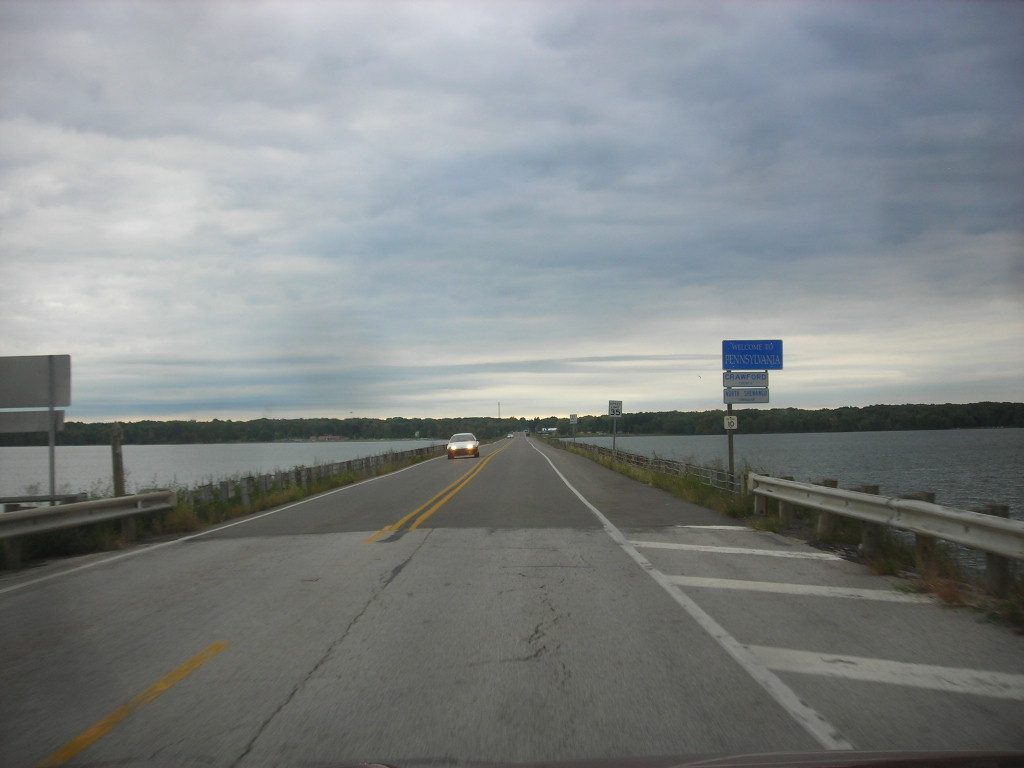
Eastern terminus of Ohio State Route 85

== History ==
SR 85 was first designated around 1923, running from SR 2 in Euclid to its current eastern terminus at PA 285. When US 6 was routed into Ohio in 1932, it was routed via the stretch of SR 85 between Euclid and Andover. For the six years following, US 6 and SR 85 were run concurrently along that stretch of roadway. By 1938, SR 85 was truncated to its current routing between Andover and the connection to Pennsylvania Route 285 on the causeway, leaving US 6 to be the lone route running between Euclid and Andover.

== Major intersections ==
The entire route is in Ashtabula County.

Location	mi	km	Destinations	Notes
Andover	0.00	0.00	US 6 / SR 7 (Andover Square)	Western terminus; access to University Hospitals Health Center-Andover
Pymatuning Reservoir	1.32– 2.66	2.12– 4.28	Pymatuning Reservoir causeway Ohio–Pennsylvania line	
Pymatuning Reservoir	2.66	4.28	PA 285 east	Continuation into North Shenango Township, Pennsylvania
1.000 mi = 1.609 km; 1.000 km = 0.621 mi
