= East Fairfield Township, Crawford County, Pennsylvania =

Township in Pennsylvania, US

Coordinates: 41°34′00″N 80°03′59″W

- Township
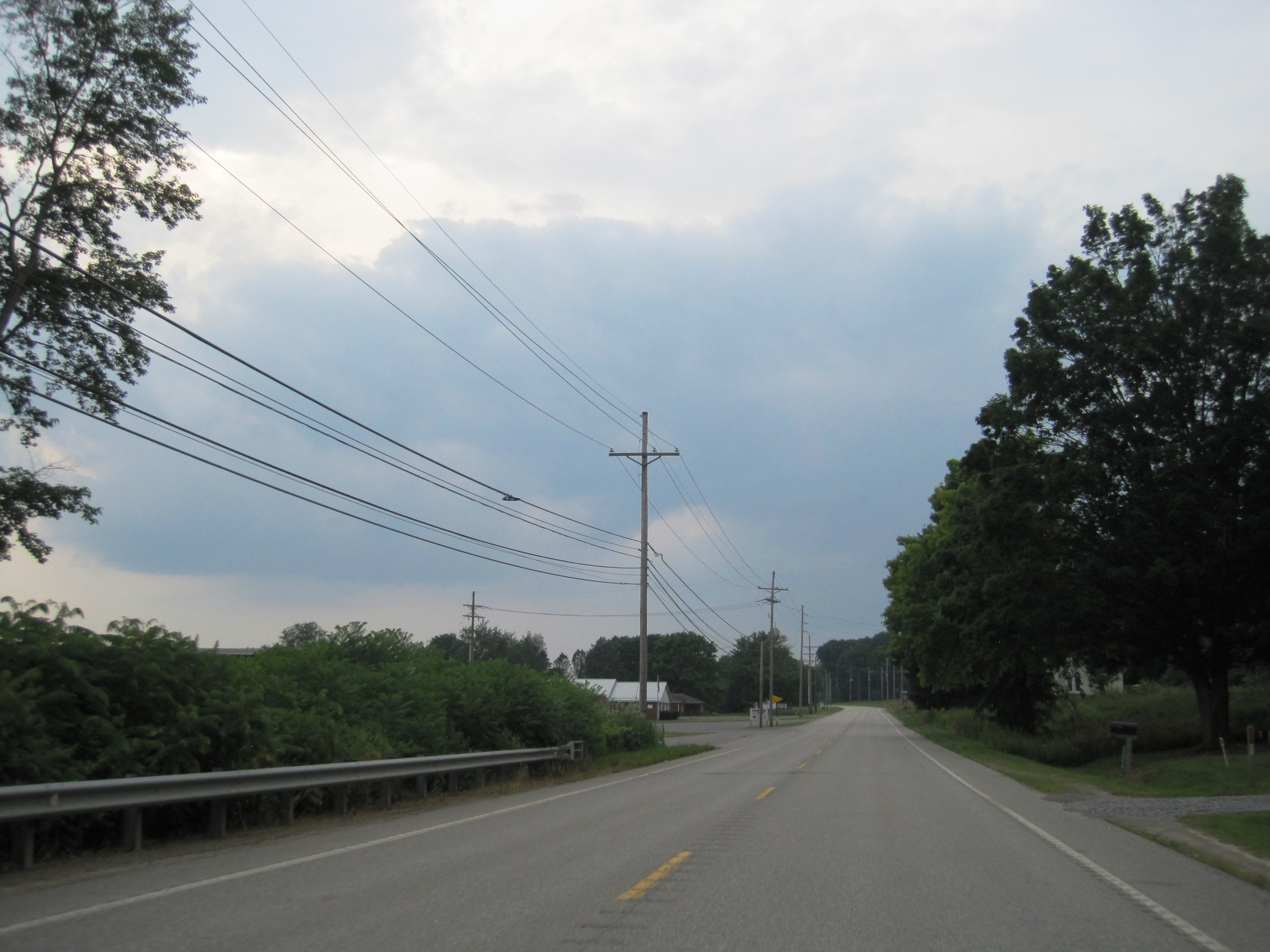
- US 322 westbound in East Fairfield Township

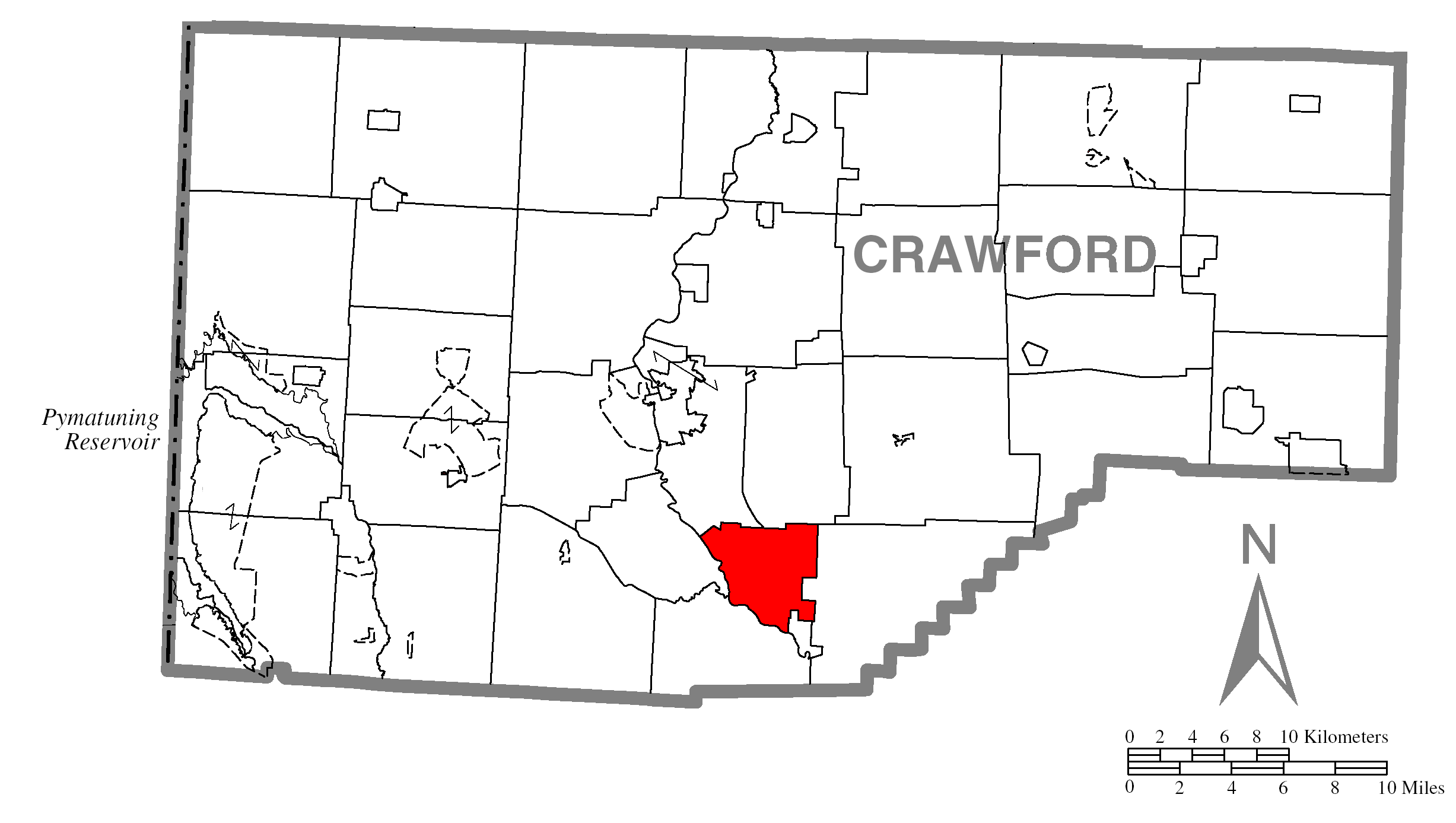
- Location of East Fairfield Township in Crawford County

- Location of Crawford County in Pennsylvania
- Country: United States
- State: Pennsylvania
- County: Crawford

Area
  - Total: 12.84 sq mi (33.25 km^{2})
  - Land: 12.84 sq mi (33.25 km^{2})
  - Water: 0 sq mi (0.00 km^{2})
- Highest elevation (just north of Freyermuth Road): 1,550 ft (470 m)
- Lowest elevation (French Creek): 1,050 ft (320 m)

Population (2020)
  - Total: 836
  - Estimate (2024): 822
  - Density: 69/sq mi (26.8/km^{2})
- Time zone: UTC-4 (EST)
  - Summer (DST): UTC-5 (EDT)
- Area code: 814
- FIPS code: 42-039-21096

East Fairfield Township is a township in Crawford County, Pennsylvania, United States. It was formed from Fairfield Township in 1869. The population was 836 at the 2020 census.

It was named in honor of William Crawford who was a defender of the white settlers from the attacks if Indians.

== Geography ==
The township is in southern Crawford County, bordered to the southwest by French Creek, a tributary of the Allegheny River. Unincorporated communities in the township include Shaws Corners in the west and Pettis Corners near the northern border. The southeastern edge of the township borders the borough of Cochranton.

According to the United States Census Bureau, the township has a total area of 12.8 square miles (33.2 km^{2}), all land.

=== Natural features ===
Geologic Province: Northwestern Glaciated Plateau
Lowest Elevation: 1,050 ft (320 m) where French Creek flows out of the township.
Highest Elevation: 1,550 ft (470 m) at a high point just north of Freyermuth Road.
Major Rivers/Streams and Watersheds: French Creek and Little Sugar Creek
Minor Rivers/Streams and Watersheds:

- Little Sugar Creek tributary (eastern township): Mud Run
- French Creek tributaries (central and western township): Little Sugar Creek and numerous unnamed

Lakes and Waterbodies: Tamarack Lake (impoundment)
Biological Diversity Areas: Little Sugar Creek at Pettis Corners BDA and Lower French Creek BDA
Important Bird Area: Conneaut Marsh-Geneva Marsh

== Demographics ==
Historical population
Census	Pop.	Note	%±
2000	848		—
2010	922		8.7%
2020	836		−9.3%
2024 (est.)	822		−1.7%
U.S. Decennial Census

As of the census of 2000, there were 848 people, 339 households, and 250 families residing in the township. The population density was 66.2 inhabitants per square mile (25.6/km^{2}). There were 418 housing units at an average density of 32.6 per square mile (12.6/km^{2}). The racial makeup of the township was 99.17% White, 0.24% African American, 0.12% Asian, and 0.47% from two or more races. Hispanic or Latino of any race were 0.12% of the population.

There were 339 households, out of which 29.5% had children under the age of 18 living with them, 65.8% were married couples living together, 7.1% had a female householder with no husband present, and 26.0% were non-families. 21.5% of all households were made up of individuals, and 10.0% had someone living alone who was 65 years of age or older. The average household size was 2.50 and the average family size was 2.91.

In the township the population was spread out, with 22.8% under the age of 18, 6.5% from 18 to 24, 28.4% from 25 to 44, 28.4% from 45 to 64, and 13.9% who were 65 years of age or older. The median age was 40 years. For every 100 females, there were 95.8 males. For every 100 females age 18 and over, there were 96.1 males.

The median income for a household in the township was $38,365, and the median income for a family was $45,000. Males had a median income of $35,188 versus $16,875 for females. The per capita income for the township was $19,063. About 4.4% of families and 4.6% of the population were below the poverty line, including 3.7% of those under age 18 and 8.9% of those age 65 or over.
