= Greenwood Township, Crawford County, Pennsylvania =

Township in Pennsylvania, US

Coordinates: 41°33′00″N 80°15′59″W

- Township
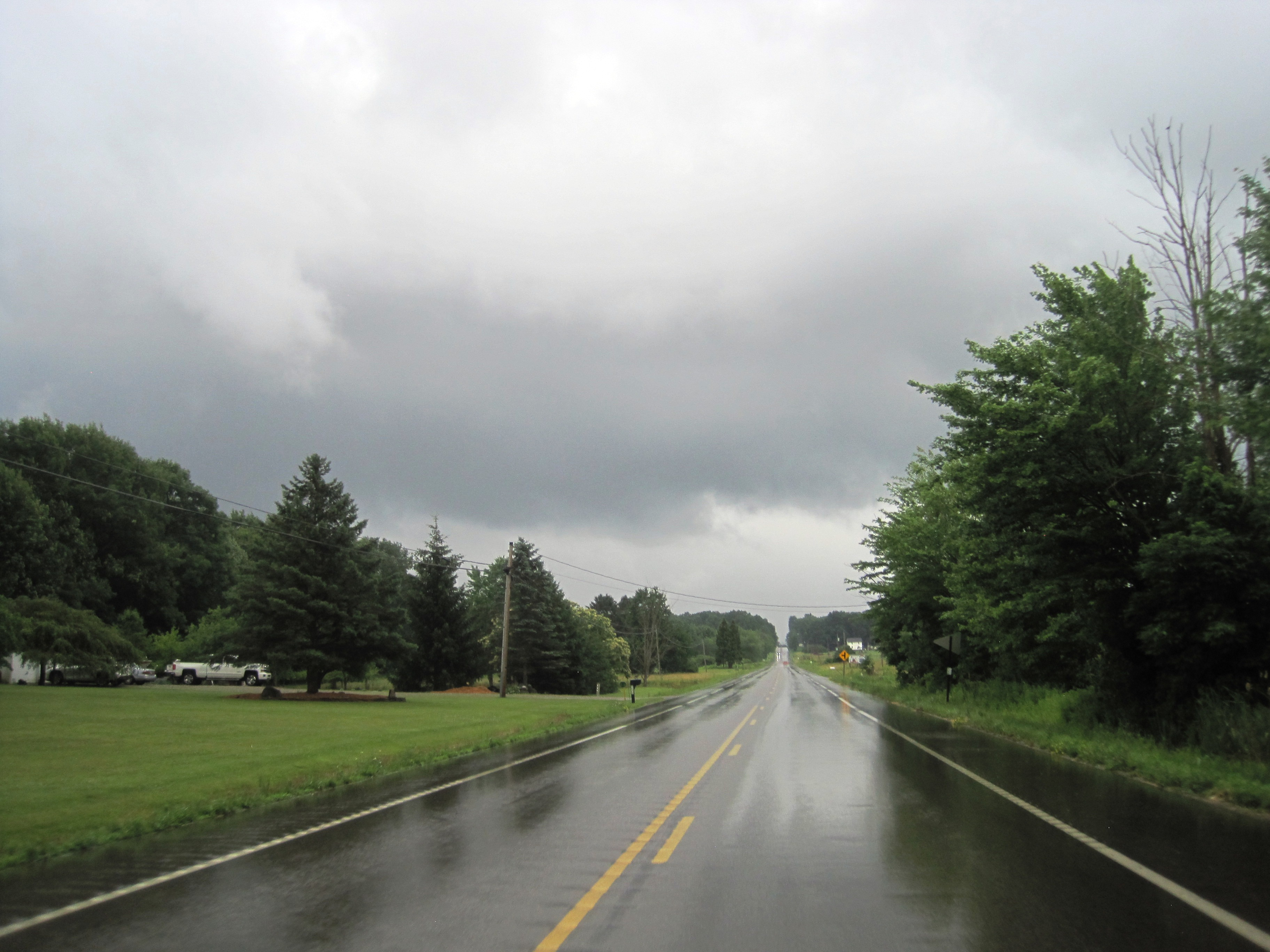
- US 19 southbound in Greenwood Township

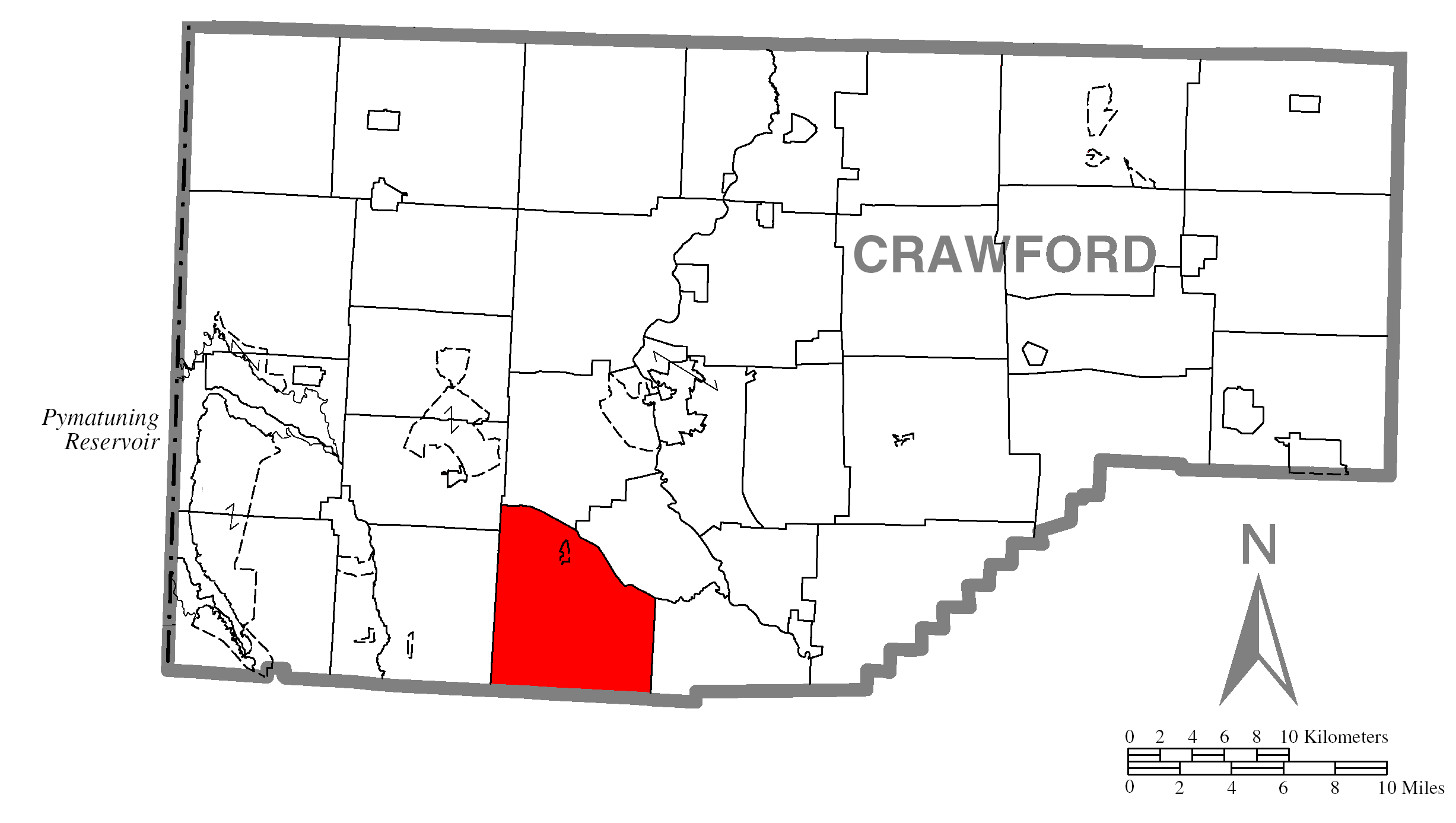
- Location of Greenwood Township in Crawford County

- Location of Crawford County in Pennsylvania
- Country: United States
- State: Pennsylvania
- County: Crawford

Area
  - Total: 36.61 sq mi (94.81 km^{2})
  - Land: 36.43 sq mi (94.35 km^{2})
  - Water: 0.18 sq mi (0.47 km^{2})
- Highest elevation (south of Wecas Corners): 1,420 ft (430 m)
- Lowest elevation (Conneaut Marsh): 1,060 ft (320 m)

Population (2020)
  - Total: 1,425 ▼
  - Estimate (2024): 1,405
  - Density: 39.0/sq mi (15.05/km^{2})
- Time zone: UTC-4 (EST)
  - Summer (DST): UTC-5 (EDT)
- Area code: 814
- FIPS code: 42-039-31400
- Website: https://greenwoodtwpcrawfordpa.gov/

Greenwood Township is a township in Crawford County, Pennsylvania, United States. It was formed in 1829 from portions of West Fallowfield and Fairfield townships. The name Greenwood may have come from the area's forests.

The population was 1,425 at the 2020 census, down from 1,454 at the 2010 census.

== Geography ==
Greenwood Township is in southern Crawford County, bordered to the south by Mercer County. It is bordered to the north by the Conneaut Outlet, a stream with associated wetlands flowing from Conneaut Lake towards French Creek, a tributary of the Allegheny River. According to the United States Census Bureau, the township has a total area of 36.6 square miles (94.8 km^{2}), of which 36.4 square miles (94.3 km^{2}) is land and 0.19 square miles (0.5 km^{2}), or 0.49%, is water. The township contains the unincorporated communities of Geneva in the north and Custards in the northeast.

Interstate 79 crosses the eastern side of the township, with access from Exit 141 (Pennsylvania Route 285) near Custards. U.S. Route 19, the Perry Highway, parallels I-79 to the west. From Exit 141, Meadville, the county seat, is 9 miles (14 km) to the north and Pittsburgh is 83 miles (134 km) to the south.

=== Natural features ===
Geologic Province: Northwestern Glaciated Plateau
Lowest Elevation: 1,060 ft (320 m) Conneaut Outlet where it flows out of the township.
Highest Elevation: 1,420 ft (430 m) at a high point southeast of Wecas Corners, Pennsylvania.
Major Rivers/Streams and Watersheds: Sandy Creek (south end of township) and Conneaut Outlet (forms northern border)
Minor Rivers/Streams and Watersheds:

- Conneaut Outlet tributaries: Rock Creek, Williams Run, and McMichael Run
- Sandy Creek tributaries: unnamed tributaries

Biological Diversity Areas: Conneaut Marsh Complex-Central BDA, Conneaut Marsh Complex-North BDA, Conneaut Marsh Complex-South BDA, Sandy Creek Wetlands BDA
Landscape Conservation Areas: Conneaut-Geneva Marsh LCA

== Keystone Ordnance Works ==
Starting on November 12, 1941, 25 days before the attack on Pearl Harbor, the quartermaster's real estate branch of the United States Army began acquiring land in Greenwood Township to build a plant for manufacturing flaked trinitrotoluene, commonly known as TNT. A total of 166 families were evacuated from their homes, and 234 tracks of land, containing 14,130 acres (22 square miles), were purchased for $560,000.

On December 8, 1941, the day after the Pearl Harbor attack, construction began on the Keystone Ordnance Works (KOW). The U.S. Army drilled 17 water wells, and constructed two pumping stations to produce the 25 million gallons of water per day needed to cool the explosives during manufacturing. Most of the houses and barns on the purchased land were torn down, and 506 new buildings were constructed, so that 8,000 workers could produce 600,000 pounds of TNT per day, using six production lines.

There were numerous buildings known as "igloos", squat concrete block structures, covered with earth, and landscaped to look like the surrounding areas. These were used to store manufactured TNT.

KOW had its own fire department, and a ten-bed hospital. Bus lines were maintained to get workers to and from the plant, and the Erie Railroad passed through the northwest end of the KOW site.

Keystone Ordnance Works manufactured TNT from December 1942 until March 17, 1944, and from September 1944 until August 15, 1945. After production ended three or four months were spent decontaminating the buildings and machinery.

Some land parcels were returned to the original owners. The U.S. Army still owns 500 acres, which is now an Army Reserve training area. On March 24, 1965 4,163 acres of the primary production site were sold to the Meadille Area Industrial Commission for $462,000 by means of a quitclaim deed. That land is now the Kebort Industrial Park. In 1967 227 acres were sold to PPG Industries, and they built a glass-making plant. In 2016 PPG Industries was purchased by Vitro Architectural Glass, which now operates the Greenwood Township plant.

== Demographics ==
Historical population
Census	Pop.	Note	%±
2000	1,487		—
2010	1,454		−2.2%
2020	1,425		−2.0%
2024 (est.)	1,405		−1.4%
U.S. Decennial Census

As of the census of 2000, there were 1,487 people, 560 households, and 427 families residing in the township. The population density was 41.1 inhabitants per square mile (15.9/km^{2}). There were 609 housing units at an average density of 16.8/sq mi (6.5/km^{2}). The racial makeup of the township was 99.26% White, 0.20% African American, 0.20% Asian, 0.07% Pacific Islander, 0.07% from other races, and 0.20% from two or more races. Hispanic or Latino of any race were 0.20% of the population.

There were 560 households, out of which 32.9% had children under the age of 18 living with them, 62.5% were married couples living together, 8.9% had a female householder with no husband present, and 23.8% were non-families. 18.8% of all households were made up of individuals, and 6.8% had someone living alone who was 65 years of age or older. The average household size was 2.66 and the average family size was 3.02.

In the township the population was spread out, with 26.5% under the age of 18, 7.1% from 18 to 24, 28.9% from 25 to 44, 26.4% from 45 to 64, and 11.1% who were 65 years of age or older. The median age was 37 years. For every 100 females, there were 102.9 males. For every 100 females age 18 and over, there were 99.1 males.

The median income for a household in the township was $35,250, and the median income for a family was $38,977. Males had a median income of $31,154 versus $19,063 for females. The per capita income for the township was $14,584. About 8.3% of families and 11.8% of the population were below the poverty line, including 19.1% of those under age 18 and 8.1% of those age 65 or over.
