= Tamarack Lake =

Lake in the state of Minnesota, United States

- Location within Minnesota
- Location: Mahnomen County, Minnesota
- Coordinates: 47°21′58″N 95°35′51″W
- Type: lake

Tamarack Lake is a lake in Mahnomen County, in the U.S. state of Minnesota. It was named after a grove of tamarack, near the lake.

== See also ==
- List of lakes in Minnesota
