= Union Township, Crawford County, Pennsylvania =

Township in Pennsylvania, US

Coordinates: 41°33′00″N 80°06′59″W

- Township
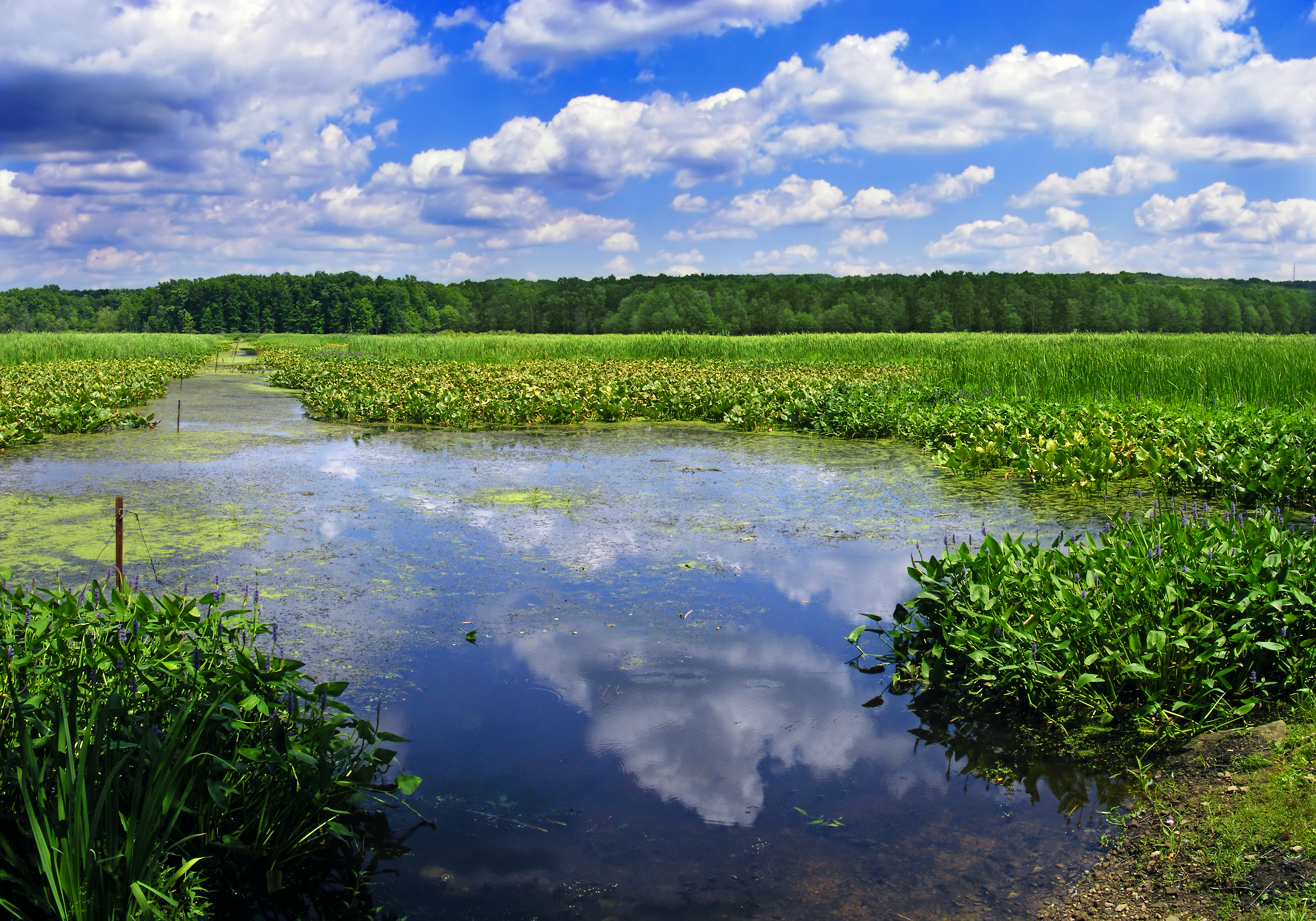
- Conneaut Marsh in Union Township

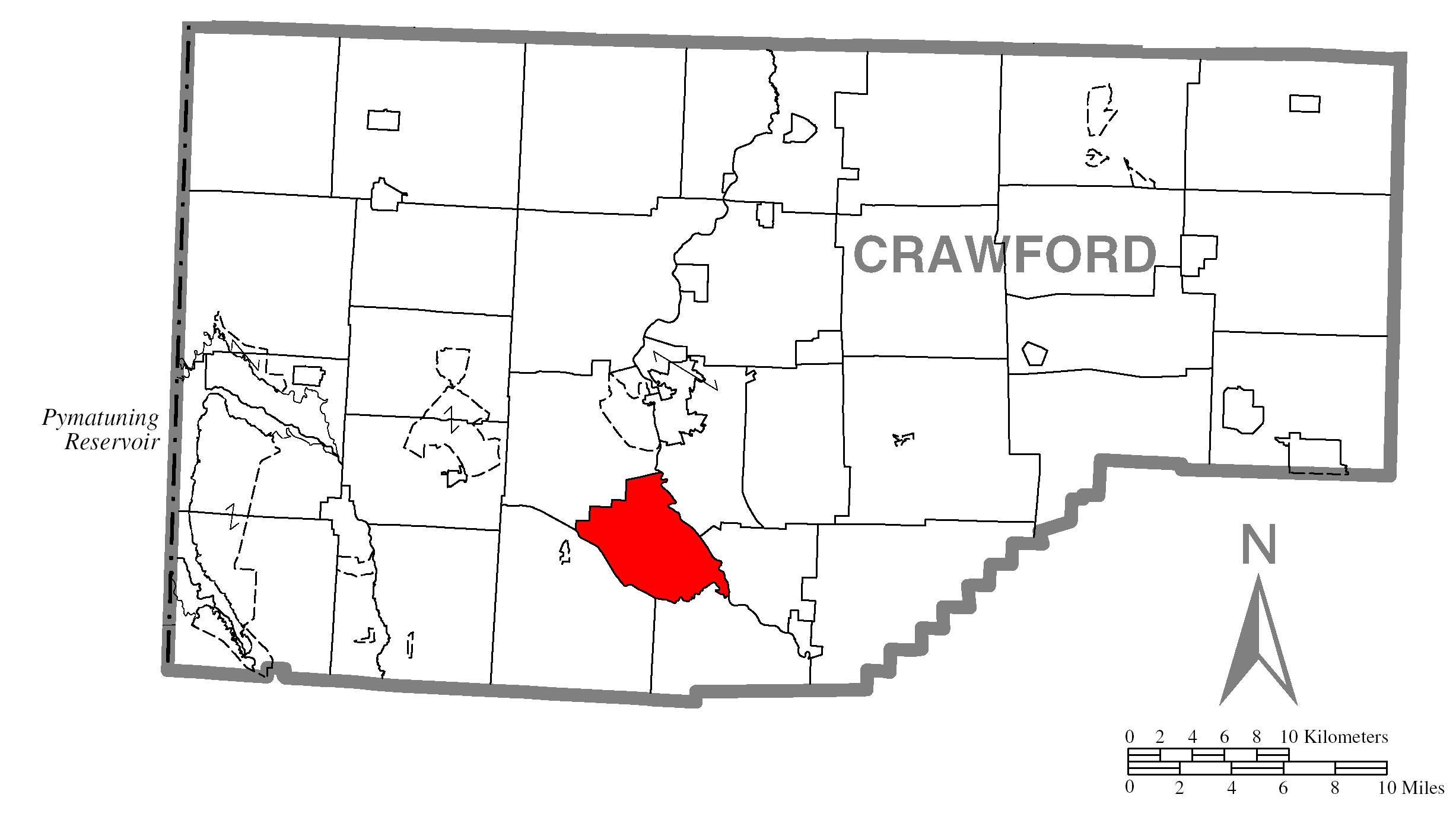
- Location of Union Township in Crawford County

- Location of Crawford County in Pennsylvania
- Country: United States
- State: Pennsylvania
- County: Crawford County

Area
  - Total: 15.88 sq mi (41.14 km^{2})
  - Land: 15.80 sq mi (40.92 km^{2})
  - Water: 0.089 sq mi (0.23 km^{2})
- Highest elevation (southeast of Center Road Corners): 1,510 ft (460 m)
- Lowest elevation (French Creek): 1,050 ft (320 m)

Population (2020)
  - Total: 856 ▼
  - Estimate (2024): 858
  - Density: 61.8/sq mi (23.85/km^{2})
- Time zone: UTC-4 (EST)
  - Summer (DST): UTC-5 (EDT)
- Area code: 814
- FIPS code: 42-039-78304

Union Township is a township in Crawford County, Pennsylvania, United States. The population was 856 at the 2020 census, down from 1,010 at the 2010 census.

== Geography ==
Union Township is in southern Crawford County, bordered to the northeast by French Creek and to the south by Conneaut Outlet, which flows through Conneaut Marsh and joins French Creek at the southeast corner of the township. Interstate 79 crosses the township, with the closest access being Exit 141 (Pennsylvania Route 285 to Geneva) to the south and Exit 147 (U.S. Route 6 and 322 to Meadville) to the north.

According to the United States Census Bureau, the township has a total area of 15.9 square miles (41.1 km^{2}), of which 15.8 square miles (40.9 km^{2}) is land and 0.08 square miles (0.2 km^{2}), or 0.55%, is water.

== Demographics ==
Historical population
Census	Pop.	Note	%±
2000	1,049		—
2010	1,010		−3.7%
2020	856		−15.2%
2024 (est.)	858		0.2%
U.S. Decennial Census

As of the census of 2000, there were 1,049 people, 412 households, and 294 families residing in the township. The population density was 66.3 inhabitants per square mile (25.6/km^{2}). There were 454 housing units at an average density of 28.7 per square mile (11.1/km^{2}). The racial makeup of the township was 98.38% White, 0.38% African American, 0.29% Native American, 0.29% Asian, 0.29% from other races, and 0.38% from two or more races. Hispanic or Latino of any race were 0.57% of the population.

There were 412 households, out of which 31.8% had children under the age of 18 living with them, 54.1% were married couples living together, 12.9% had a female householder with no husband present, and 28.6% were non-families. 23.8% of all households were made up of individuals, and 9.2% had someone living alone who was 65 years of age or older. The average household size was 2.55 and the average family size was 2.99.

In the township the population was spread out, with 26.3% under the age of 18, 5.6% from 18 to 24, 31.5% from 25 to 44, 22.9% from 45 to 64, and 13.7% who were 65 years of age or older. The median age was 37 years. For every 100 females there were 96.8 males. For every 100 females age 18 and over, there were 88.5 males.

The median income for a household in the township was $37,333, and the median income for a family was $44,375. Males had a median income of $34,821 versus $21,250 for females. The per capita income for the township was $16,816. About 8.2% of families and 9.2% of the population were below the poverty line, including 14.5% of those under age 18 and 11.0% of those age 65 or over.
