= Teresa Forcier =

American politician (born 1953)

Member of the Pennsylvania House of Representatives from the 6th district
- In office January 1, 1991 – November 30, 2006
- Preceded by: Connie Maine
- Succeeded by: Brad Roae

Personal details
- Born: October 6, 1953 (age 72) Meadville, Pennsylvania
- Party: Republican
- Spouse: Kevin W. Forcier

Teresa E. Forcier (formerly Teresa E. Fosburg Brown; born October 6, 1953) is an American politician and former Republican member of the Pennsylvania House of Representatives. She represented the 6th legislative district, which consists of parts of Crawford County, from 1991 to 2006.

She graduated from Cambridge Springs High School in 1971. She attended classes at Alliance College and Edinboro University of Pennsylvania. Prior to elective office, Forcier served as assistant director in the Crawford County Tax Claim Bureau. She also worked for the Pennsylvania House of Representatives as a legislative assistant. She was named Crawford County Republican Woman of the Year for 1995 by the Northwest Council of Republican Women.

Forcier voted against the 2005 legislative pay raise, but accepted the controversial "unvouchered expenses," which contributed to her loss in the 2006 republican primary to Brad Roae.
