= Cochranton, Pennsylvania =

Borough in Pennsylvania, US

- Borough
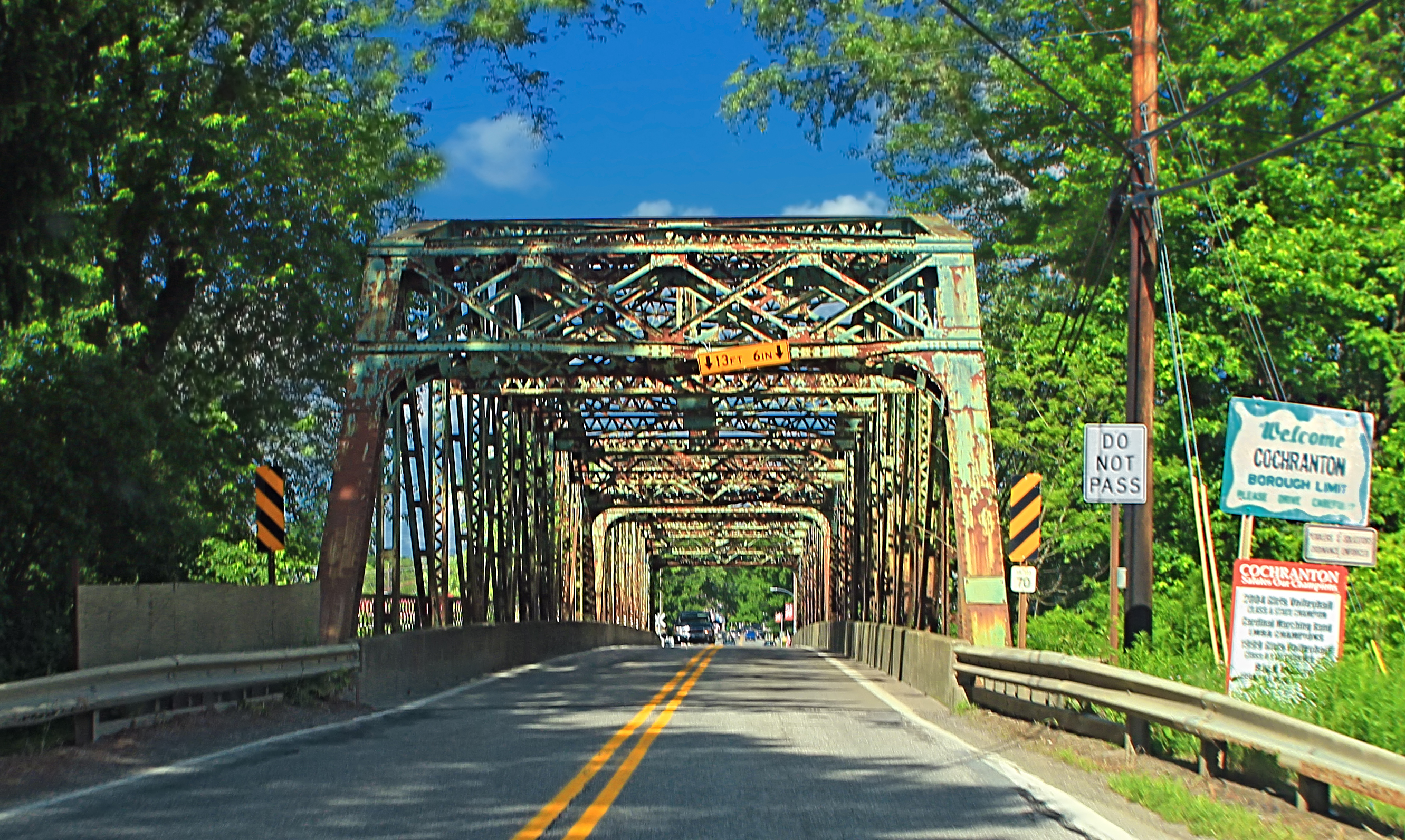
- Adams Street Bridge over French Creek. This bridge was replaced in late 2015.

- Flag Seal

- Location of Cochranton in Crawford County, Pennsylvania.

- Location of Cochranton in Pennsylvania
- Coordinates: 41°31′10″N 80°2′56″W
- Country: United States
- State: Pennsylvania
- County: Crawford County
- Founded: 1800

Government
  - Mayor: Mark Roche

Area
  - Total: 1.20 sq mi (3.11 km^{2})
  - Land: 1.20 sq mi (3.11 km^{2})
  - Water: 0 sq mi (0.00 km^{2})
- Elevation (middle of borough): 1,065 ft (325 m)
- Highest elevation (Northeast corner of borough): 1,300 ft (400 m)
- Lowest elevation (French Creek): 1,050 ft (320 m)

Population (2020)
  - Total: 1,121
  - Estimate (2022): 1,107
  - Density: 931.2/sq mi (359.52/km^{2})
- Time zone: UTC-4 (EST)
  - Summer (DST): UTC-5 (EDT)
- ZIP code: 16314
- Area code: 814
- FIPS code: 42-14800
- Website: cochrantonboro.org

Cochranton is a borough in Crawford County, Pennsylvania, United States. The population was 1,124 at the 2020 census, down from 1,136 as of the 2010 census.

== Geography ==
Cochranton is located on the southern boundary of Crawford County at 41°31′10″N 80°2′56″W (41.519497, -80.048906). It is bordered by East Fairfield Township to the north, Wayne Township to the east, and Fairfield Township to the southwest.

According to the United States Census Bureau, the borough has a total area of 1.2 square miles (3.1 km^{2}), all land. French Creek, a southeastward-flowing tributary of the Allegheny River, forms the southwestern border of the borough. Little Sugar Creek enters the borough from the east, passes north of the center of town, and joins French Creek just north of the Adams Street bridge.

U.S. Route 322 passes through the northern part of the borough, bypassing the downtown. US 322 leads 10 miles (16 km) northwest to Meadville, the county seat, and southeast 16 miles (26 km) to Franklin on the Allegheny River. Pennsylvania Route 173 passes through the borough center as Adams Street, leading northeast 8 miles (13 km) to Mount Hope and south 10 miles (16 km) to New Lebanon. Pennsylvania Route 285 departs PA 173 just west of the borough limits, leading west 8 miles (13 km) to Interstate 79 near Custards.

== Creation of borough ==
Cochranton was created by order of the Crawford County Court of Quarter Sessions on April 5, 1855. Early settler Charles Cochran, along with other residents of the community, had petitioned the county court for borough status. The borough consists of the original land grants of John Adams and Thomas Cochran (who may have been distantly related to petitioner Charles Cochran). The borough plot was surveyed by Joseph Cochran, the first school teacher, and the son of Thomas Cochran.

The first election was held on April 14, 1855. James Greer was elected Burgess, and the first borough council consisted of Charles Cochran, D. M. DeVore, Samuel Markle, William T. Dunn, and Hugh Smith.

== Demographics ==
Historical population
| Census | Pop. | Note | %± |
|---|---|---|---|
| 1860 | 250 | | — |
| 1870 | 459 | | 83.6% |
| 1880 | 645 | | 40.5% |
| 1890 | 655 | | 1.6% |
| 1900 | 640 | | −2.3% |
| 1910 | 695 | | 8.6% |
| 1920 | 647 | | −6.9% |
| 1930 | 727 | | 12.4% |
| 1940 | 793 | | 9.1% |
| 1950 | 1,092 | | 37.7% |
| 1960 | 1,139 | | 4.3% |
| 1970 | 1,229 | | 7.9% |
| 1980 | 1,240 | | 0.9% |
| 1990 | 1,174 | | −5.3% |
| 2000 | 1,148 | | −2.2% |
| 2010 | 1,136 | | −1.0% |
| 2020 | 1,118 | | −1.6% |
| 2022 (est.) | 1,107 | ▼ | −1.0% |

As of the census of 2000, there were 1,148 people, 478 households, and 335 families residing in the borough. The population density was 953.8 inhabitants per square mile (368.3/km^{2}). There were 506 housing units at an average density of 420.4 per square mile (162.3/km^{2}). The racial makeup of the borough was 98.78% White, 0.44% African American, 0.09% Native American, 0.26% Asian, and 0.44% from two or more races. Hispanic or Latino of any race were 0.09% of the population.

There were 478 households, of which 28.2% had children under the age of 18 living with them, 55.9% were married couples living together, 10.7% had a female householder with no husband present, and 29.9% were non-families. 26.4% of all households were made up of individuals, and 14.4% comprised someone living alone who was 65 years of age or older. The average household size was 2.40 and the average family size was 2.84.

The age distribution of the borough was: 23.3% under the age of 18; 7.4% from 18 to 24; 26.4% from 25 to 44; 26.2% from 45 to 64; and 16.7% 65 years of age or older. The median age was 41 years. For every 100 females there were 90.4 males. For every 100 females age 18 and over, there were 90.7 males.

The median income for a household in the borough was $36,625, and the median income for a family was $45,463. Males had a median income of $33,333 versus $21,792 for females. The per capita income for the borough was $18,960. About 6.7% of families and 11.3% of the population were below the poverty line, including 23.2% of those under age 18 and 11.8% of those age 65 or over.
