= Pennsylvania Route 285 =

State highway in Crawford County, Pennsylvania, US

Pennsylvania Route 285
- PA 285 highlighted in red

Route information
- Maintained by PennDOT
- Length: 27.1 mi (43.6 km)
- Existed: 1936–present
- Tourist routes: Crawford Lakelands Scenic Byway

Major junctions
- West end: SR 85 at the Ohio state line on Lake Pymatuning
- US 6 / US 322 / PA 18 in Conneaut Lake; US 19 in Greenwood Township; I-79 in Greenwood Township
- East end: PA 173 in Cochranton

Location
- Country: United States
- State: Pennsylvania
- Counties: Crawford

Highway system
- Pennsylvania State Route System; Interstate; US; State; Scenic; Legislative
| ← PA 284 | → PA 286 |

Pennsylvania Route 285 (PA 285) is an 27.1-mile-long (43.6 km), east–west state highway located in Crawford County in Pennsylvania, United States. The western terminus is the Ohio state line on Lake Pymatuning, where the road becomes Ohio State Route 85 (SR 85). The eastern terminus is at PA 173 in Cochranton.

== Route description ==
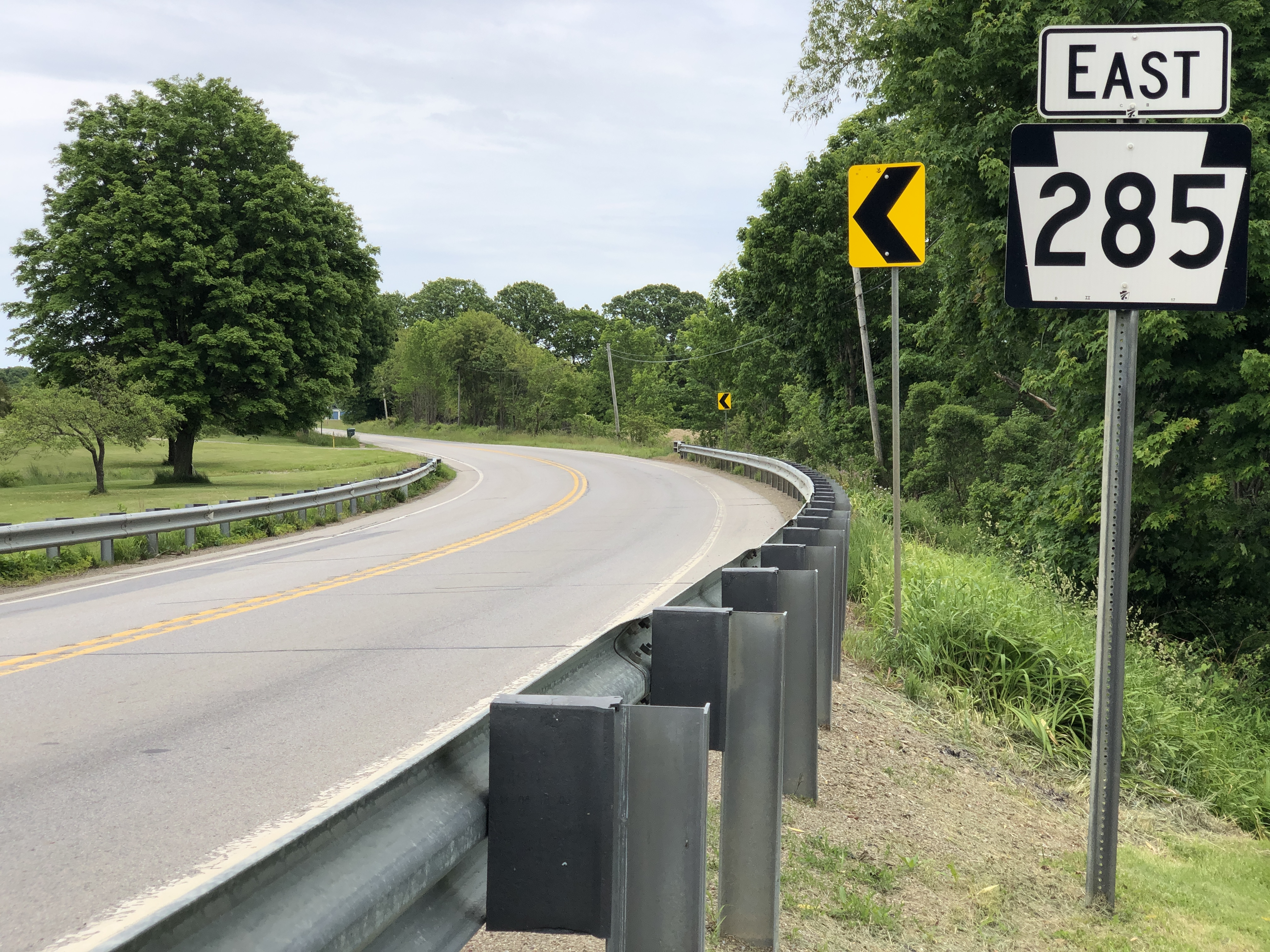
PA 285 eastbound in East Fallowfield Township

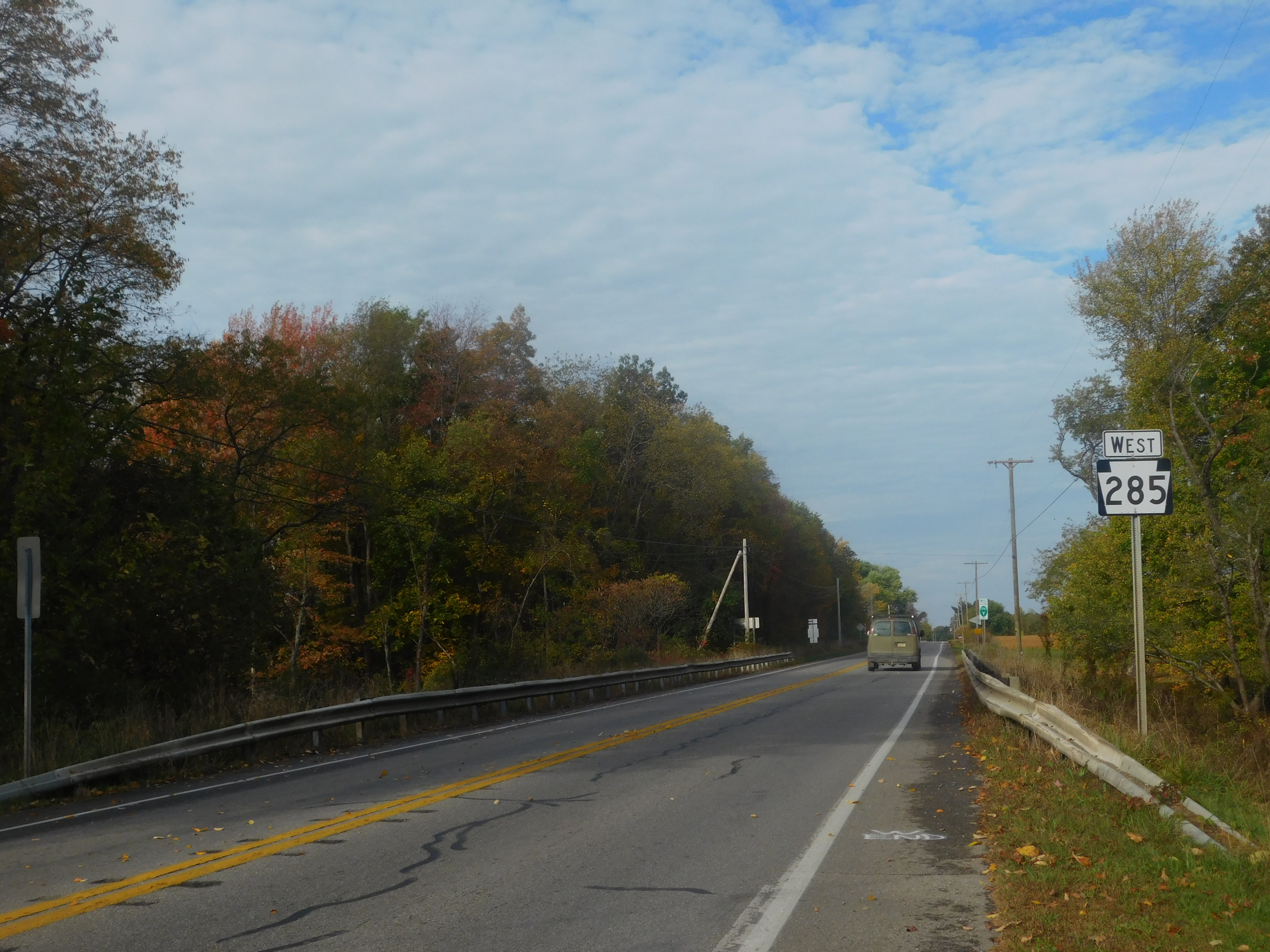
PA 285 west of Conneaut Lake

PA 285 goes by many names along its route. The names along its route includes Steele's Court, Third Street, Brooks Crossing Road, and Townhouse Court.

The route begins on the Ohio state line over Lake Pymatuning in North Shenango Township, at the terminus of SR 85. The route heads east, going in and out of Pymatuning State Park before short concurrencies with US 6, and US 322/PA 18 in the town of Conneaut Lake. After exiting the town to the south, the route winds southeast to the intersections of US 19 and I-79 in Greenwood Township. The route continues east for several miles before terminating in the town of Cochranton, at an intersection with PA 173.

== History ==
First signed in 1936, the route would be signed in different areas along the route. In the early 1970s, the route was moved from its old alignment from Hartstown Road to Conneaut Lake, where it previously had a concurrency with US 322 into the town. Also in the early 1970s, the route's eastern terminus was moved from US 62 to its current terminus on PA 173.

== Major intersections ==
The entire route is in Crawford County.

| Location | mi | km | Destinations | Notes |
|---|---|---|---|---|
| Pymatuning Reservoir | 0.00– 1.34 | 0.00– 2.16 | SR 85 west | Continuation into Ohio |
| Pymatuning Reservoir | 0.00– 1.34 | 0.00– 2.16 | Pymatuning Causeway; Pennsylvania–Ohio line | |
| Conneaut Lake | 10.7 | 17.2 | US 6 west (Water Street) – Linesville | Western terminus of US 6 concurrency |
| Conneaut Lake | 11.2 | 18.0 | US 322 west / PA 18 south (4th Street) | Western terminus of US 322 / PA 18 concurrencies |
| Conneaut Lake | 11.2 | 18.0 | US 6 east / US 322 east / PA 18 north (Water Street) / 3rd Street – Meadville | Eastern terminus of US 6 / US 322 / PA 18 concurrencies |
| Greenwood Township | 19.6 | 31.5 | US 19 (Perry Highway) – Meadville, Mercer | |
| Greenwood Township | 19.8 | 31.9 | I-79 – Pittsburgh, Erie | Exit 141 (I-79) |
| Fairfield Township | 27.1 | 43.6 | PA 173 – Cochranton, Sandy Lake | Eastern terminus |
1.000 mi = 1.609 km; 1.000 km = 0.621 mi: Concurrency terminus
