= East Mead Township, Crawford County, Pennsylvania =

Township in Pennsylvania, US

Coordinates: 41°38′00″N 80°02′59″W

- Township
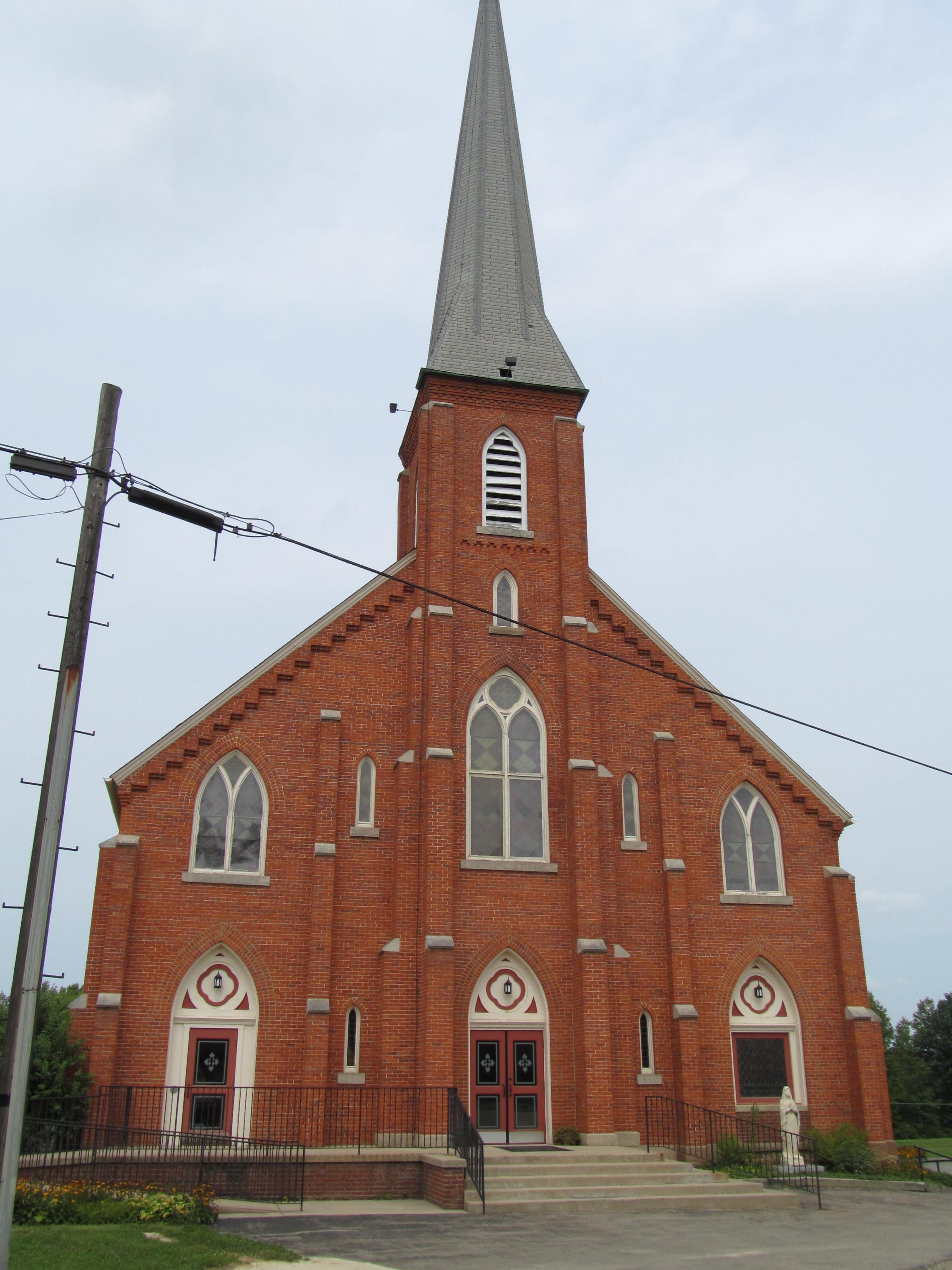
- St. Hippolyte Church in Frenchtown

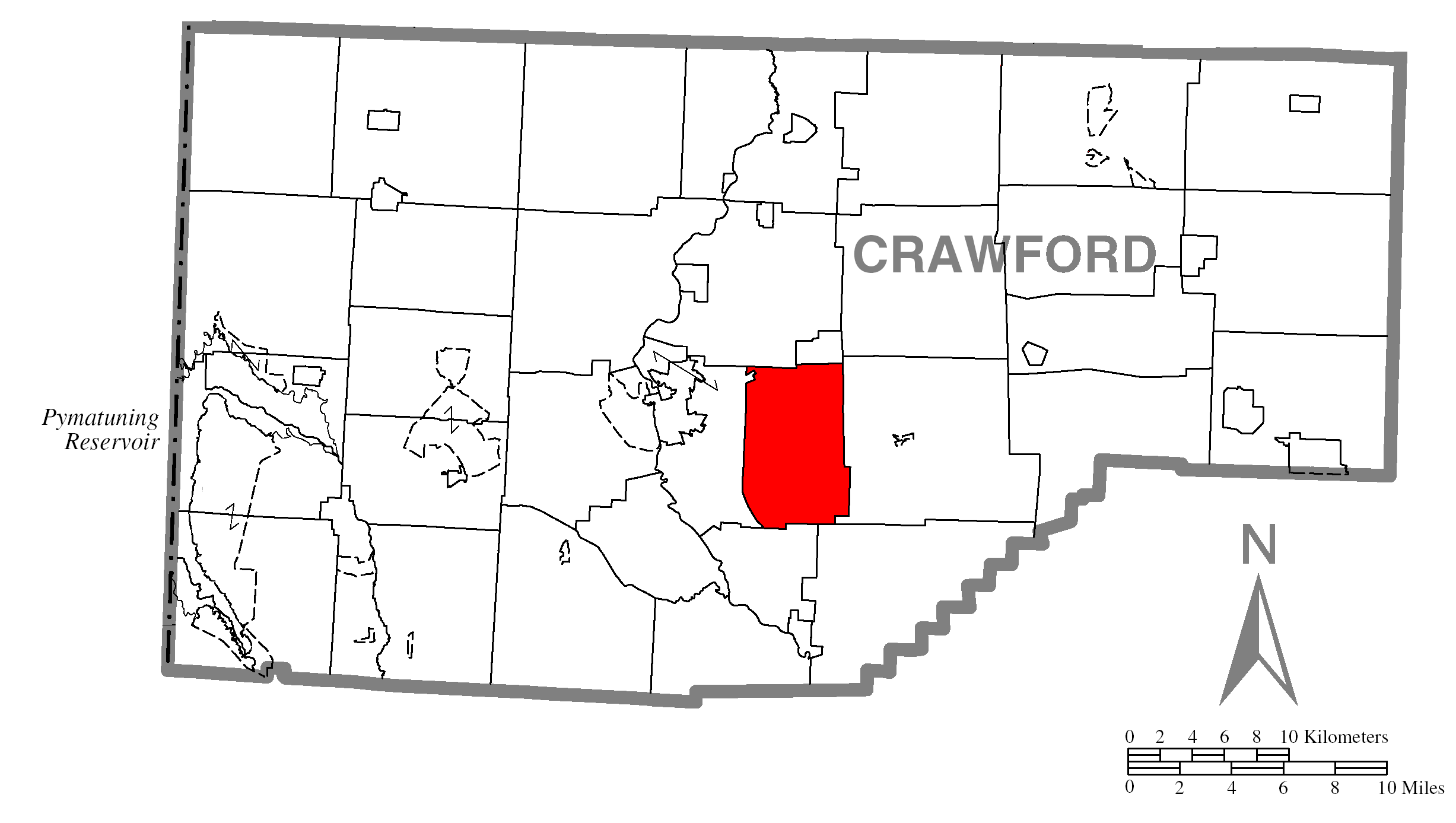
- Location of East Mead Township in Crawford County

- Location of Crawford County in Pennsylvania
- Country: United States
- State: Pennsylvania
- County: Crawford County

Area
  - Total: 23.43 sq mi (60.69 km^{2})
  - Land: 22.85 sq mi (59.19 km^{2})
  - Water: 0.58 sq mi (1.50 km^{2})
- Highest elevation (high point west of Wayland on PA 27): 1,610 ft (490 m)
- Lowest elevation (Little Sugar Creek): 1,180 ft (360 m)

Population (2020)
  - Total: 1,320 ▼
  - Estimate (2024): 1,286
  - Density: 63.0/sq mi (24.31/km^{2})
- Time zone: UTC-4 (EST)
  - Summer (DST): UTC-5 (EDT)
- Area code: 814
- FIPS code: 42-039-21504
- Website: https://eastmeadtownship.com/

East Mead Township is a township in Crawford County, Pennsylvania, United States. The population was 1,320 at the 2020 census, down from 1,493 in the 2010 census.

== Geography ==
The township is located just south of the center of Crawford County and contains the unincorporated communities of Wayland (in the west) and Frenchtown (in the east). Tamarack Lake crosses the southwestern corner of the township.

According to the United States Census Bureau, the township has a total area of 23.3 square miles (60.3 km^{2}), of which 22.9 square miles (59.2 km^{2}) is land and 0.42 square miles (1.1 km^{2}), or 1.85%, is water.

=== Natural features ===
Geologic Province: Northwestern Glaciated Plateau
Lowest Elevation: 1,180 ft (360 m) Little Sugar Creek, where it flows southward out of the township.
Highest Elevation: 1,610 ft (490 m) at a high point west of Wayland on PA 27.
Major Rivers/Streams and Watersheds: Little Sugar Creek (most of township) and Woodcock Creek
Minor Rivers/Streams and Watersheds:

- Little Sugar Creek tributary: Mud Run
- Woodcock Creek tributary (northern part of township): unnamed tributary

Lakes and Waterbodies: Tamarack Lake and Yosets Lake (both impoundments)
Biological Diversity Areas: Little Sugar Creek at Blooming Valley BDA, Little Sugar Creek at Pettis Corner BDA, Yoset Lake Palustrine Forest BDA

== Demographics ==
Historical population
Census	Pop.	Note	%±
2000	1,485		—
2010	1,493		0.5%
2020	1,320		−11.6%
2024 (est.)	1,286		−2.6%
U.S. Decennial Census

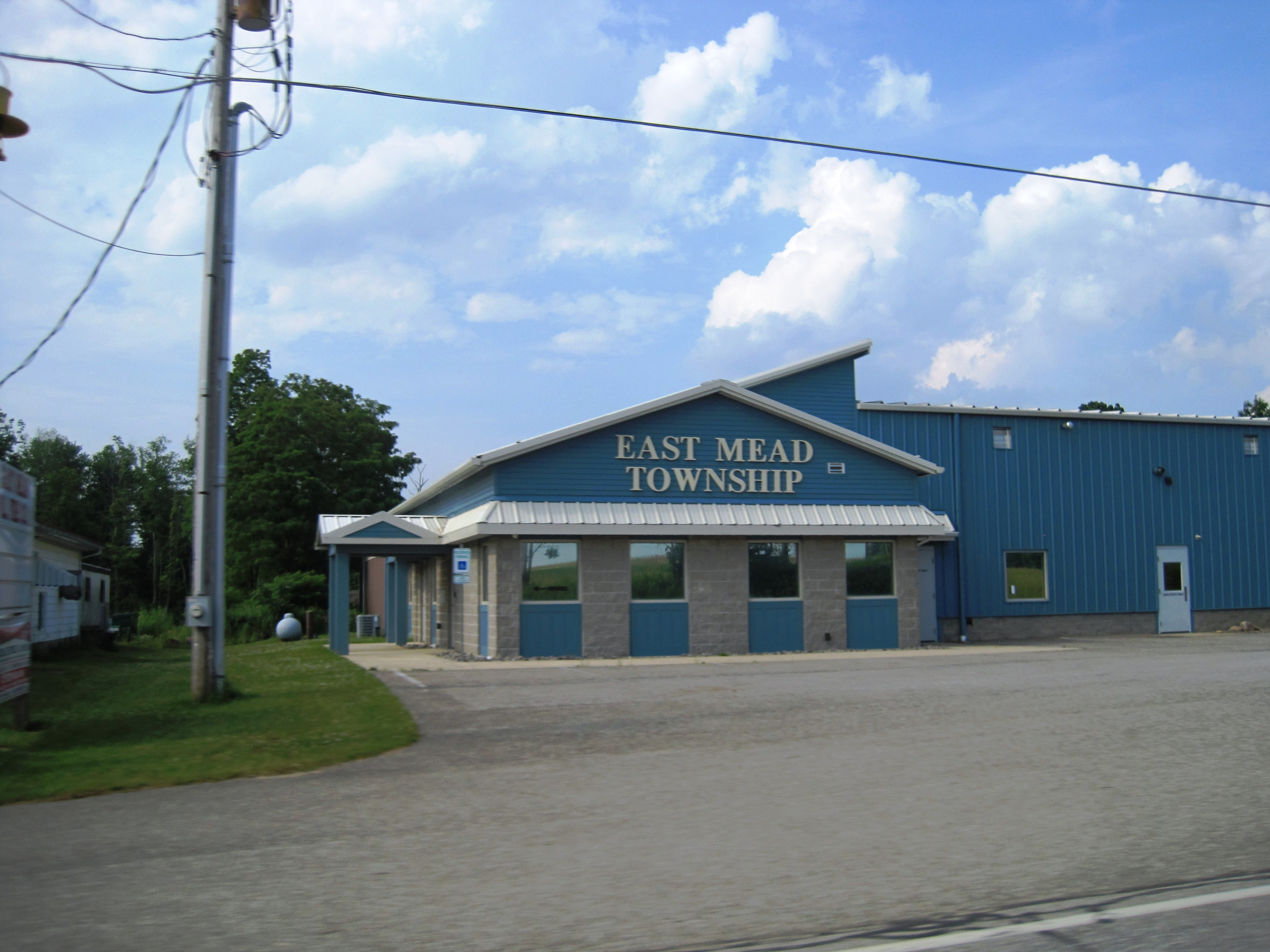
East Mead Municipal Building

As of the census of 2000, there were 1,485 people, 558 households, and 414 families residing in the township. The population density was 65.0 inhabitants per square mile (25.1/km^{2}). There were 608 housing units at an average density of 26.6 per square mile (10.3/km^{2}). The racial makeup of the township was 98.72% White, 0.07% African American, 0.13% Native American, 0.07% Asian, and 1.01% from two or more races. Hispanic or Latino of any race were 0.67% of the population.

There were 558 households, out of which 33.3% had children under the age of 18 living with them, 62.7% were married couples living together, 7.5% had a female householder with no husband present, and 25.8% were non-families. 21.1% of all households were made up of individuals, and 6.6% had someone living alone who was 65 years of age or older. The average household size was 2.66 and the average family size was 3.08.

In the township the population was spread out, with 26.7% under the age of 18, 8.2% from 18 to 24, 28.3% from 25 to 44, 25.0% from 45 to 64, and 11.9% who were 65 years of age or older. The median age was 37 years. For every 100 females there were 104.8 males. For every 100 females age 18 and over, there were 104.3 males.

The median income for a household in the township was $38,839, and the median income for a family was $43,438. Males had a median income of $31,293 versus $21,573 for females. The per capita income for the township was $18,138. About 7.3% of families and 8.1% of the population were below the poverty line, including 11.8% of those under age 18 and 6.5% of those age 65 or over.
