= Cussewago Township, Crawford County, Pennsylvania =

Township in Pennsylvania, US

Coordinates: 41°48′00″N 80°15′59″W

- Township
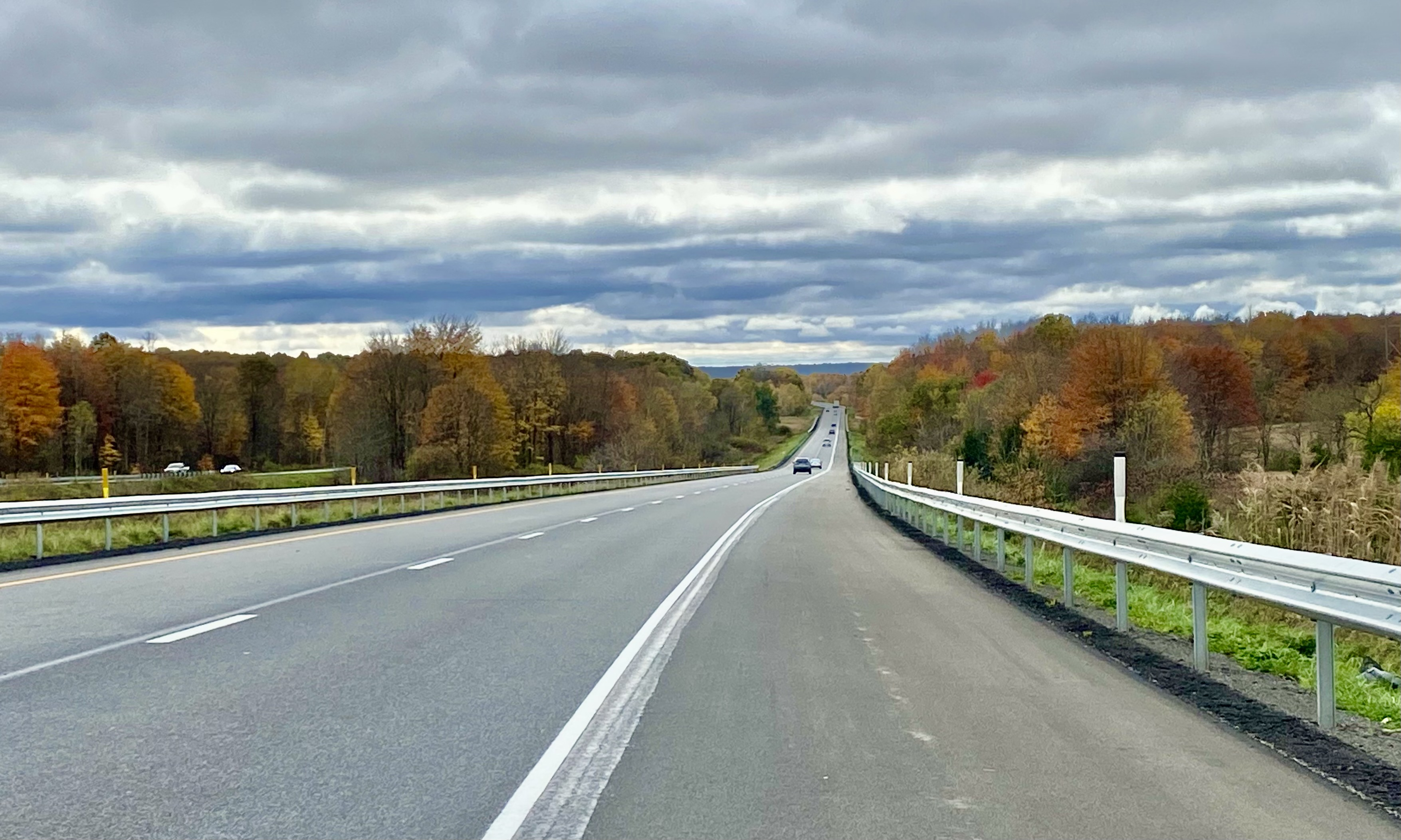
- I-79 in Cussewago Township

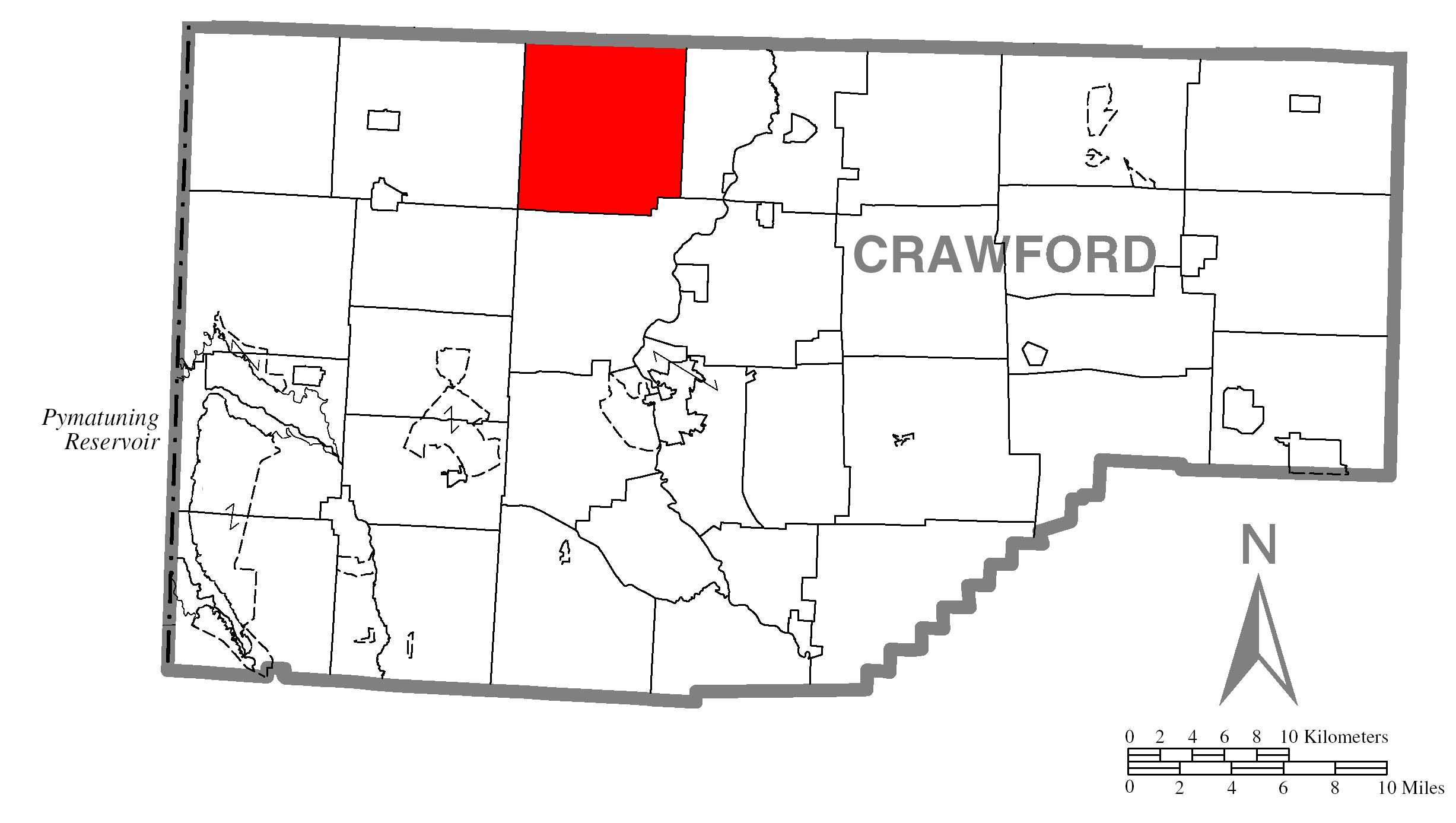
- Location of Cussewago Township in Crawford County

- Location of Crawford County in Pennsylvania
- Country: United States
- State: Pennsylvania
- County: Crawford County

Area
  - Total: 40.92 sq mi (105.99 km^{2})
  - Land: 40.83 sq mi (105.74 km^{2})
  - Water: 0.10 sq mi (0.26 km^{2})
- Highest elevation (southeast of Gospel Hill Church): 1,551 ft (473 m)
- Lowest elevation (Cussewago Creek): 1,090 ft (330 m)

Population (2020)
  - Total: 1,430
  - Estimate (2024): 1,429
  - Density: 37.6/sq mi (14.52/km^{2})
- Time zone: UTC-4 (EST)
  - Summer (DST): UTC-5 (EDT)
- Area code: 814
- FIPS code: 42-039-17848
- Website: cussewagotownship.com

Cussewago Township is a township in Crawford County, Pennsylvania, United States. The population was 1,430 at the 2020 census.

== Geography ==
The township is located in northern Crawford County and is bordered by Erie County to the north. Cussewago Creek, a tributary of French Creek and part of the Allegheny River watershed, flows from north to south across the western side of the township.

Unincorporated communities in the township include Crossingville in the northwest and Mosiertown in the south. Interstate 79 crosses the eastern side of the township from north to south, but with no exits; the closest are Exit 154 (Pennsylvania Route 198), 2 miles (3 km) south of the southern border, and Exit 166 (U.S. Route 6N), two miles north of the northern border.

According to the United States Census Bureau, the township has a total area of 40.9 square miles (106.0 km^{2}), of which 40.8 square miles (105.7 km^{2}) is land and 0.12 square miles (0.3 km^{2}), or 0.24%, is water.

=== Natural Features ===
Geologic Province: Northwestern Glaciated Plateau
Lowest Elevation: 1,000 ft (300 m) where Cussewago Creek flows south out of the township.
Highest Elevation: 1,551 ft (473 m) in the southeastern part of the township corner
Major Rivers/Streams and Watersheds: Cussewago Creek and French Creek
Minor Rivers/Streams and Watersheds:

- French Creek tributaries: Wolf Run and Boles Run
- Cussewago Creek tributaries: Carr Run and its tributary, Rundelltown Creek, and West Branch Cussewago Creek

Lakes and Waterbodies: Several impoundments in Cussewago Creek floodplain
Biological Diversity Areas: Carr Run BDA, Cussewago Creek Central Riparian Corridor BDA, Cussewago Creek at Crossingville BDA, and Pont Road Wetlands BDA
Important Bird Area: Cussewago Bottom and Erie National Wildlife Refuge

Most of the township is wooded (56.8%), with agricultural use a distant second at 21.7%. The two combined account for over 75% of the land use in the township.

== Demographics ==
Historical population
| Census | Pop. | Note | %± |
|---|---|---|---|
| 2000 | 1,597 | | — |
| 2010 | 1,559 | | −2.4% |
| 2020 | 1,430 | | −8.3% |
| 2024 (est.) | 1,429 | | −0.1% |
U.S. Decennial Census

As of the census of 2000, there were 1,597 people, 591 households, and 437 families residing in the township. The population density was 38.9 inhabitants per square mile (15.0/km^{2}). There were 644 housing units at an average density of 15.7/sq mi (6.0/km^{2}). The racial makeup of the township was 97.81% White, 0.31% African American, 0.13% Native American, 0.06% Asian, 0.50% from other races, and 1.19% from two or more races. Hispanic or Latino of any race were 0.75% of the population.

There were 591 households, out of which 36.5% had children under the age of 18 living with them, 63.5% were married couples living together, 6.4% had a female householder with no husband present, and 25.9% were non-families. 21.2% of all households were made up of individuals, and 8.5% had someone living alone who was 65 years of age or older. The average household size was 2.70 and the average family size was 3.14.

In the township the population was spread out, with 28.3% under the age of 18, 6.8% from 18 to 24, 29.7% from 25 to 44, 24.7% from 45 to 64, and 10.5% who were 65 years of age or older. The median age was 37 years. For every 100 females there were 104.5 males. For every 100 females age 18 and over, there were 104.1 males.

The median income for a household in the township was $37,656, and the median income for a family was $47,273. Males had a median income of $33,295 versus $23,833 for females. The per capita income for the township was $18,918. About 7.1% of families and 9.5% of the population were below the poverty line, including 15.0% of those under age 18 and 7.1% of those age 65 or over.
