= Cussewago =

Cussewago may refer to:

- Cussewago Creek, a stream in Pennsylvania
- Cussewago Township, Crawford County, Pennsylvania
