= Spring Township, Pennsylvania =

Spring Township is the name of some places in the U.S. state of Pennsylvania:

- Spring Township, Berks County, Pennsylvania
- Spring Township, Centre County, Pennsylvania
- Spring Township, Crawford County, Pennsylvania
- Spring Township, Perry County, Pennsylvania
- Spring Township, Snyder County, Pennsylvania
