= Carr Run (Cussewago Creek tributary) =

Stream in Pennsylvania, USA

Carr Run Tributary to Cussewago Creek
- Location of Carr Run mouth Carr Run (Cussewago Creek tributary) (the United States)

Location
- Country: United States
- State: Pennsylvania
- County: Crawford

Physical characteristics
- Source: Conneaut Creek divide
  - location: about 2 miles east of Springboro, Pennsylvania
  - coordinates: 41°47′36″N 080°19′58″W
  - elevation: 1,240 ft (380 m)
- Mouth: Cussewago Creek
  - location: about 1.5 miles west of Mosiertown, Pennsylvania
  - coordinates: 41°46′15″N 080°14′31″W
  - elevation: 1,098 ft (335 m)
- Length: 7.56 mi (12.17 km)
- Basin size: 23.29 square miles (60.3 km^{2})
- Discharge
  - location: Cussewago Creek
  - average: 41.80 cu ft/s (1.184 m^{3}/s) at mouth with Cussewago Creek

Basin features
- Progression: north then southeast
- River system: Allegheny River
- Tributaries
  - left: unnamed tributaries
  - right: Rundelltown Creek
- Bridges: Springboro Road, N Center Road, Springboro Road, E Spring Road, Cussewago Road

Carr Run is a 7.56 mi (12.17 km) long 3rd order tributary to Cussewago Creek in Crawford County, Pennsylvania.

== Course ==
Carr Run rises about 1.5 miles east of Springboro, Pennsylvania, and then flows north then southeast to join Cussewago Creek about 1.5 miles west of Mosiertown, Pennsylvania.

== Watershed ==
Carr Run drains 23.29 square miles (60.3 km^{2}) of area, receives about 45.6 in/year of precipitation, has a wetness index of 508.61, and is about 47% forested.

== See also ==
- List of rivers of Pennsylvania
