= Spring Township, Crawford County, Pennsylvania =

Township in Pennsylvania, US

Coordinates: 41°48′00″N 80°19′59″W

- Township
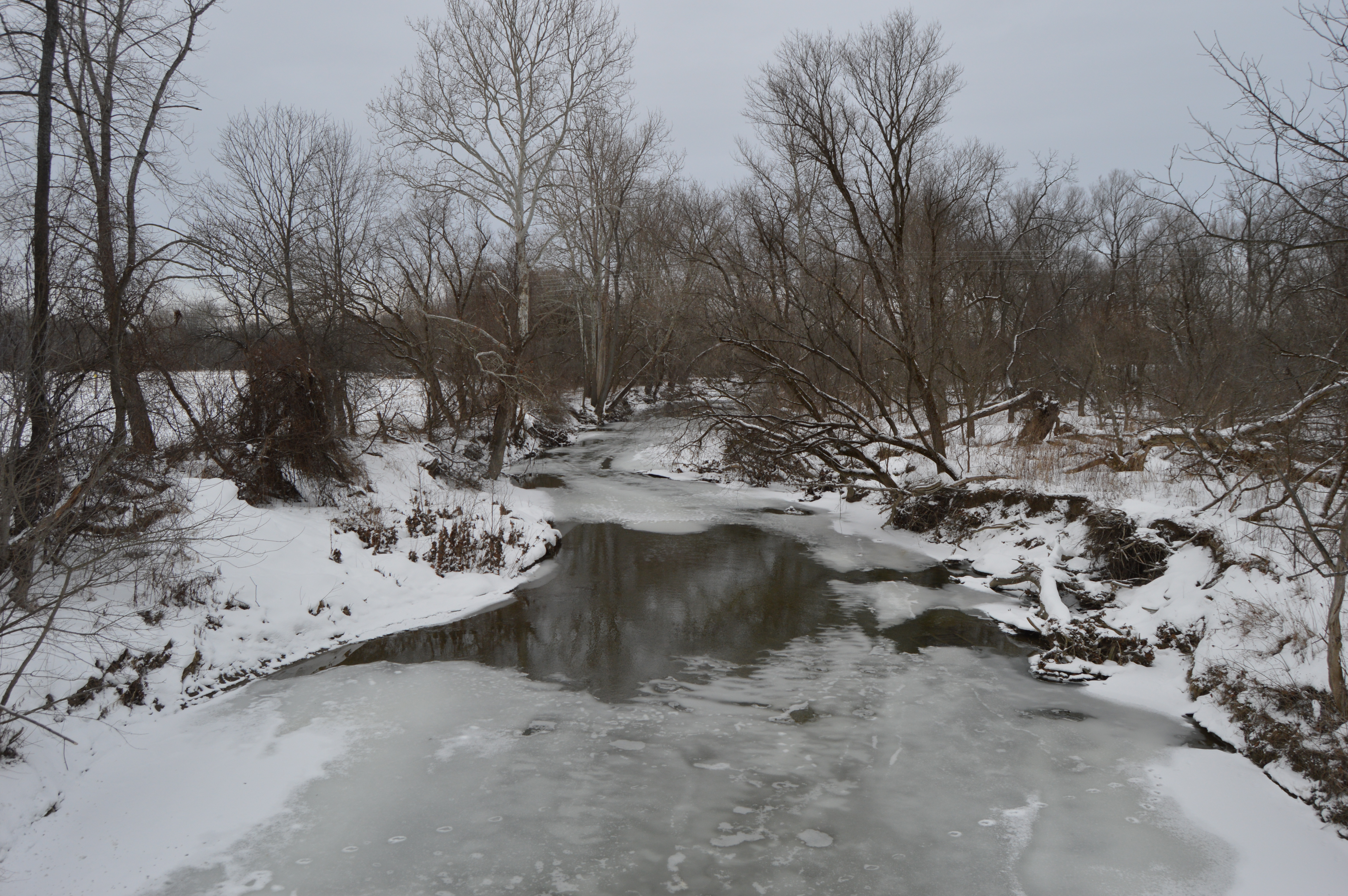
- Conneaut Creek, partly frozen by winter weather

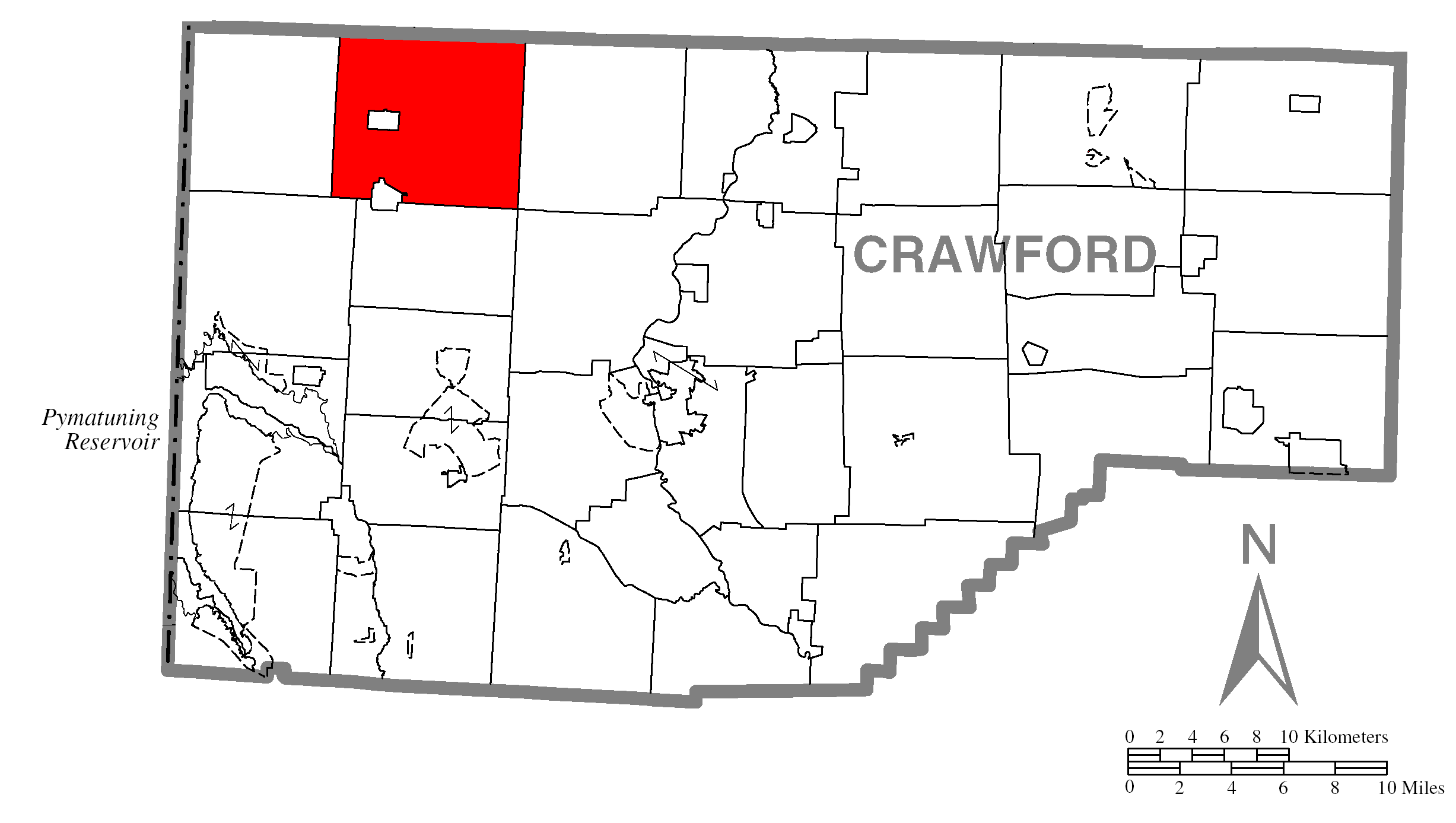
- Location of Spring Township in Crawford County

- Location of Crawford County in Pennsylvania
- Country: United States
- State: Pennsylvania
- County: Crawford County

Area
  - Total: 45.69 sq mi (118.34 km^{2})
  - Land: 45.68 sq mi (118.30 km^{2})
  - Water: 0.015 sq mi (0.04 km^{2})
- Highest elevation (north of East Spring Church): 1,350 ft (410 m)
- Lowest elevation (Conneaut Creek): 850 ft (260 m)
  - Rank: lowest point in Crawford County, Pennsylvania

Population (2020)
  - Total: 1,409 ▼
  - Estimate (2024): 1,395
  - Density: 33.2/sq mi (12.83/km^{2})
- Time zone: UTC-4 (EST)
  - Summer (DST): UTC-5 (EDT)
- Area code: 814
- FIPS code: 42-039-72840

Spring Township is a township in Crawford County, Pennsylvania, United States. The population was 1,409 at the 2020 census, down from 1,548 at the 2010 census.

== Geography ==
Spring Township is in northwestern Crawford County, bordered to the north by Erie County. The borough of Springboro is in the western part of the township, and the borough of Conneautville is along the southern border; the boroughs are separate municipalities from the township. Conneaut Creek, a tributary of Lake Erie, flows from south to north through the western side of the township. The Rundell Cemetery, a remnant of the hamlet of Rundell, also known as Rundelltown, with its post office named Rundell's, is located east of the bend of Rundelltown Road beside Rundelltown Creek, off King Road.

According to the United States Census Bureau, the township has a total area of 45.69 square miles (118.34 km^{2}), of which 45.68 square miles (118.30 km^{2}) is land and 0.02 square miles (0.04 km^{2}), or 0.03%, is water.

== Demographics ==
Historical population
Census	Pop.	Note	%±
2000	1,571		—
2010	1,548		−1.5%
2020	1,409		−9.0%
2024 (est.)	1,395		−1.0%
U.S. Decennial Census

As of the census of 2000, there were 1,571 people, 577 households, and 443 families residing in the township. The population density was 34.4 inhabitants per square mile (13.3/km^{2}). There were 657 housing units at an average density of 14.4/sq mi (5.6/km^{2}). The racial makeup of the township was 98.15% White, 0.38% African American, 0.06% Native American, 0.25% Asian, 0.06% Pacific Islander, 0.13% from other races, and 0.95% from two or more races. Hispanic or Latino of any race were 0.64% of the population.

There were 577 households, out of which 36.0% had children under the age of 18 living with them, 60.5% were married couples living together, 9.7% had a female householder with no husband present, and 23.1% were non-families. 18.2% of all households were made up of individuals, and 7.6% had someone living alone who was 65 years of age or older. The average household size was 2.72 and the average family size was 3.07.

In the township the population was spread out, with 27.9% under the age of 18, 8.3% from 18 to 24, 26.4% from 25 to 44, 25.3% from 45 to 64, and 12.1% who were 65 years of age or older. The median age was 37 years. For every 100 females there were 107.8 males. For every 100 females age 18 and over, there were 104.7 males.

The median income for a household in the township was $33,676, and the median income for a family was $36,471. Males had a median income of $29,773 versus $21,250 for females. The per capita income for the township was $14,821. About 12.2% of families and 14.9% of the population were below the poverty line, including 20.9% of those under age 18 and 9.0% of those age 65 or over.
