= West Branch Cussewago Creek =

Stream in Pennsylvania, USA

West Branch Cussewago Creek Tributary to Cussewago Creek
- Location of West Branch Cussewago Creek mouth West Branch Cussewago Creek (the United States)

Location
- Country: United States
- State: Pennsylvania
- County: Crawford; Erie

Physical characteristics
- Source: Cussewago Creek divide
  - location: pond about 1 mile northwest of Lavery, Pennsylvania
  - coordinates: 41°53′14″N 080°04′40″W
  - elevation: 1,285 ft (392 m)
- Mouth: Cussewago Creek
  - location: about 0.25 miles west of Crossingville, Pennsylvania
  - coordinates: 41°49′40″N 080°14′46″W
  - elevation: 1,115 ft (340 m)
- Length: 5.55 mi (8.93 km)
- Basin size: 11.33 square miles (29.3 km^{2})
- Discharge
  - location: Cussewago Creek
  - average: 20.30 cu ft/s (0.575 m^{3}/s) at mouth with Cussewago Creek

Basin features
- Progression: generally south
- River system: Allegheny River
- Tributaries
  - left: unnamed tributaries
  - right: unnamed tributaries
- Bridges: US 6N, Blazy Road, Pageville Road, Crossingville Road, Morley Road

West Branch Cussewago Creek is a 5.55 mi (8.93 km) long 2nd order tributary to Cussewago Creek in Crawford and Erie Counties, Pennsylvania. This is the only stream of this name in the United States.

== Course ==
West Branch Cussewago Creek rises in a pond about 1 mile northwest of Lavery, Pennsylvania, and then flows generally south to join Cussewago creek about 0.25 miles west of Crossingville.

== Watershed ==
West Branch Cussewago Creek drains 11.33 square miles (29.3 km^{2}) of area, receives about 45.1 in/year of precipitation, has a wetness index of 501.45, and is about 57% forested.

== See also ==
- List of rivers of Pennsylvania
