= Springboro, Pennsylvania =

Borough in Pennsylvania, US

- Borough
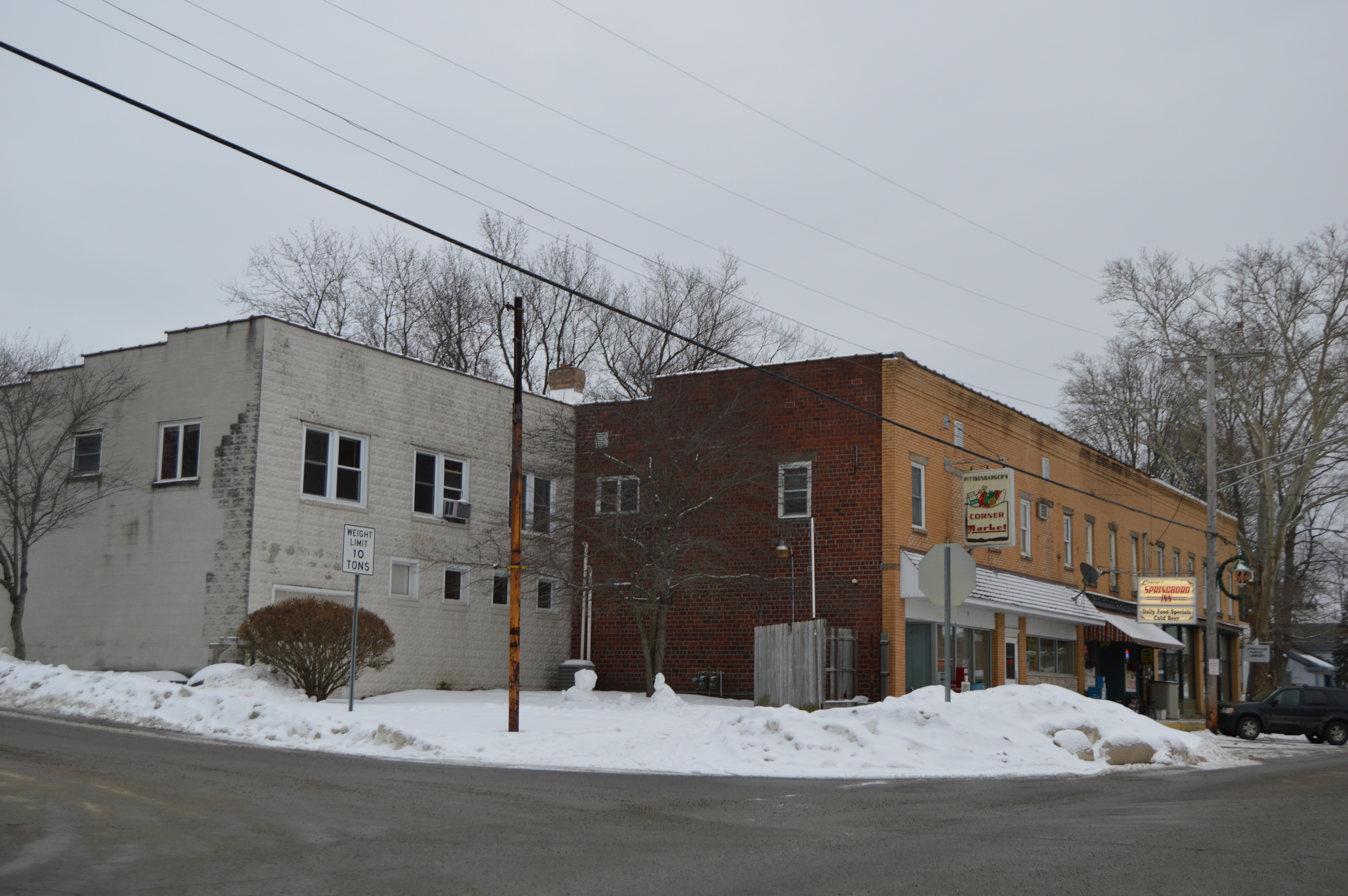
- Commercial district at the crossroads

- Location of Springboro in Crawford County, Pennsylvania.

- Location of Springboro in Pennsylvania
- Coordinates: 41°48′0″N 80°22′16″W
- Country: United States
- State: Pennsylvania
- County: Crawford
- Founded: 1800

Government
  - Mayor: Arthur Leroy Johnson

Area
  - Total: 0.83 sq mi (2.15 km^{2})
  - Land: 0.83 sq mi (2.15 km^{2})
  - Water: 0 sq mi (0.00 km^{2})
- Elevation (middle of borough): 940 ft (290 m)
- Highest elevation (northeast corner of borough): 1,100 ft (340 m)
- Lowest elevation (Conneaut Creek): 890 ft (270 m)

Population (2020)
  - Total: 376
  - Estimate (2022): 371
  - Density: 538.1/sq mi (207.75/km^{2})
- Time zone: UTC-4 (EST)
  - Summer (DST): UTC-5 (EDT)
- Postal code: 16435
- Area code: 814
- FIPS code: 42-72872

Springboro is a borough in Crawford County, Pennsylvania, United States, located 35 miles southwest of Erie. The population was 376 at the 2020 census, down from 477 at the 2010 census.

== History ==
Incorporated as a borough in the spring of 1866, the crossroads officially became Springboro in 1840. 2015 is the 175th year.

== Geography ==
Springboro is located in northwestern Crawford County at 41°48′0″N 80°22′16″W (41.800055, -80.371031). It is surrounded by Spring Township, a separate municipality.

Pennsylvania Route 18 passes through the center of town, leading north 6 miles (10 km) to Albion and south 3 miles (5 km) to Conneautville.

According to the United States Census Bureau, the borough has a total area of 0.83 square miles (2.15 km^{2}), all land. Conneaut Creek flows northward through the western side of the borough on its way to Lake Erie.

== Demographics ==
Historical population
Census	Pop.	Note	%±
1870	323		—
1880	379		17.3%
1890	490		29.3%
1900	603		23.1%
1910	614		1.8%
1920	542		−11.7%
1930	487		−10.1%
1940	570		17.0%
1950	611		7.2%
1960	583		−4.6%
1970	584		0.2%
1980	557		−4.6%
1990	471		−15.4%
2000	491		4.2%
2010	477		−2.9%
2020	377		−21.0%
2022 (est.)	371	▼	−1.6%

As of the census of 2000, there were 491 people, 183 households, and 133 families residing in the borough. The population density was 577.5 inhabitants per square mile (223.0/km^{2}). There were 208 housing units at an average density of 244.6 per square mile (94.4/km^{2}). The racial makeup of the borough was 96.33% White, 3.46% African American and 0.20% Native American.

There were 183 households, out of which 32.8% had children under the age of 18 living with them, 51.4% were married couples living together, 12.6% had a female householder with no husband present, and 27.3% were non-families. 24.0% of all households were made up of individuals, and 9.8% had someone living alone who was 65 years of age or older. The average household size was 2.68 and the average family size was 3.17.

In the borough the population was spread out, with 27.3% under the age of 18, 9.2% from 18 to 24, 30.1% from 25 to 44, 20.2% from 45 to 64, and 13.2% who were 65 years of age or older. The median age was 34 years. For every 100 females there were 99.6 males. For every 100 females age 18 and over, there were 89.9 males.

The median income for a household in the borough was $36,875, and the median income for a family was $40,694. Males had a median income of $29,632 versus $18,750 for females. The per capita income for the borough was $14,258. About 6.5% of families and 9.7% of the population were below the poverty line, including 11.0% of those under age 18 and 5.6% of those age 65 or over.

== Religion ==
The Serbian Orthodox Monastery of the Nativity of the Most Holy Theotokos (dedicated to the Birth of the Mother of God) is located 1 mile (1.6 km) north of Springboro. The monastery is under the jurisdiction of the Serbian Orthodox Church.
