= Rundelltown Creek =

Stream in Pennsylvania, US

Rundelltown Creek Tributary to Carr Run
- Location of Rundelltown Creek mouth Rundelltown Creek (the United States)

Location
- Country: United States
- State: Pennsylvania
- County: Crawford

Physical characteristics
- Source: Pine Run divide
  - location: about 0.25 miles south of Norrisville, Pennsylvania
  - coordinates: 41°43′23″N 080°16′48″W
  - elevation: 1,385 ft (422 m)
- Mouth: Carr Run
  - location: about 2 miles northeast of Rundell, Pennsylvania
  - coordinates: 41°46′52″N 080°15′16″W
  - elevation: 1,101 ft (336 m)
- Length: 7.69 mi (12.38 km)
- Basin size: 11.95 square miles (31.0 km^{2})
- Discharge
  - location: Carr Run
  - average: 21.92 cu ft/s (0.621 m^{3}/s) at mouth with Carr Run

Basin features
- Progression: generally northeast
- River system: Allegheny River
- Tributaries
  - left: unnamed tributaries
  - right: unnamed tributaries
- Bridges: Radio Road, PA 198, Carr Road, King Road, Rundelltown Road

Rundelltown Creek is a 7.69 mi (12.38 km) long 2nd order tributary to Carr Run in Crawford County, Pennsylvania.

== Course ==
Rundelltown Creek rises about 0.25 miles south of Norrisville, Pennsylvania, and then flows northeast to join Carr Run about 2 miles northeast of Rundell, Pennsylvania.

== Watershed ==
Rundelltown Creek drains 11.95 square miles (31.0 km^{2}) of area, receives about 45.7 in/year of precipitation, has a wetness index of 509.52, and is about 54% forested.

== See also ==
- List of rivers of Pennsylvania
