= Cussewago Creek =

Stream in Pennsylvania, USA

Cussewago Creek Tributary to French Creek
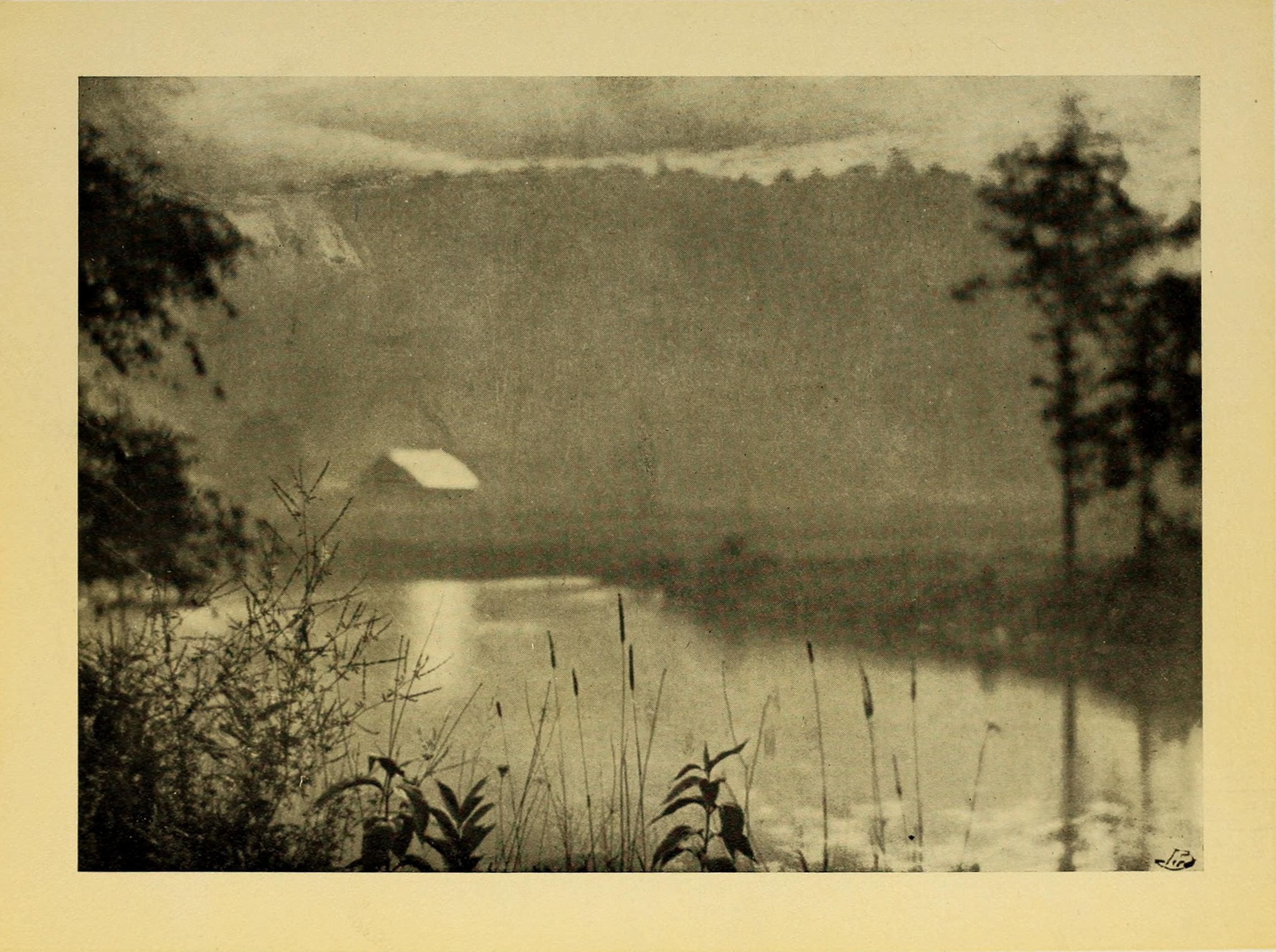
- A 1922 photograph of Cussewago Creek

- Location of Cussewago Creek mouth Cussewago Creek (the United States)

Location
- Country: United States
- States: Pennsylvania
- Counties: Crawford; Erie

Physical characteristics
- Source: divide between Cussewago Creek and Elk Creek
  - location: about 0.25 miles north of Eureka Corners, Pennsylvania
  - coordinates: 41°54′33″N 080°12′08″W
  - elevation: 1,315 ft (401 m)
- Mouth: French Creek
  - location: Meadville, Pennsylvania
  - coordinates: 41°38′21″N 080°09′44″W
  - elevation: 1,063 ft (324 m)
- Length: 35.08 mi (56.46 km)
- Basin size: 97.29 square miles (252.0 km^{2})
- Discharge
  - location: French Creek
  - average: 166.02 cu ft/s (4.701 m^{3}/s) at mouth with French Creek

Basin features
- Progression: south
- River system: Allegheny River
- Tributaries
  - left: Spring Run
  - right: West Branch Cussewago Creek; Carr Run
- Bridges: I-86, Hazen Road, North Road, Findley Lake Road, Greenman Road, I-86, Station Road, Ashton Road, NY 89, Wildman Road, Knoyle Road, Jones Road, PA 89,

Cussewago Creek is a 35.08 mi (56.46 km) long tributary to French Creek that is classed as a 4th order stream on the EPA waters geoviewer site.

== Variant names ==
According to the Geographic Names Information System, it has also been known historically as:

- Cassewago Creek
- Kossewago Creek

The name of the creek is alleged to come from the aboriginal inhabitants, and is said to mean, "big belly".

== Course ==
Cussewago Creek rises north of Eureka Springs in Erie County, Pennsylvania and flows south into Crawford County, Pennsylvania to meet French Creek at Meadville.

== Watershed ==
Cussewago Creek drains 97.29 square miles (252.0 km^{2}) of Erie Drift Plain (glacial geology). The watershed receives an average of 45.4 in/year of precipitation and has a wetness index of 492.71. The watershed is about 44% forested.

== Natural history ==
Cussewago Creek supports a diverse fauna, including mammals, amphibians, fishes, and mollusks.

== See also ==
- List of rivers of Pennsylvania
- List of tributaries of the Allegheny River
