= List of municipalities in Pennsylvania =

Pennsylvania municipalities
- Map of the 2,555 municipalities in Pennsylvania
- Category: Second-level administrative division
- Location: Pennsylvania
- Number: 1,545 Townships; 953 Boroughs; 56 Cities; 1 Town
- Populations: 5 (Centralia) – 1,603,797 (Philadelphia)
- Areas: 0.03 square miles (0.078 km^{2}) (Coaldale) – 157 square miles (410 km^{2}) (Shippen Township)
- Government: Municipal government

Map of the United States with Pennsylvania highlighted in red

Pennsylvania is a state located in the Northeastern United States. As of the 2020 U.S. census, Pennsylvania is the fifth-most populous state with 13,002,700 inhabitants and the 32nd-largest by land area spanning 44,742.70 square miles (115,883.1 km^{2}) of land. Pennsylvania is divided into 67 counties and contains 2,555 municipalities. Under Pennsylvania law, there are four types of incorporated municipalities in the Commonwealth. From those largest in population to smallest, and excluding the single town of Bloomsburg, they are:

- Cities (see cities list)
- Boroughs (see boroughs list)
- Townships (see townships list)

Pennsylvania also contains many unincorporated communities with often better known or famous names; for example, Levittown is a sizable census-designated place that straddles multiple municipalities. Many others today are neighborhoods, once organized about a railroad passenger station or post office.

== Municipalities ==
=== Cities ===
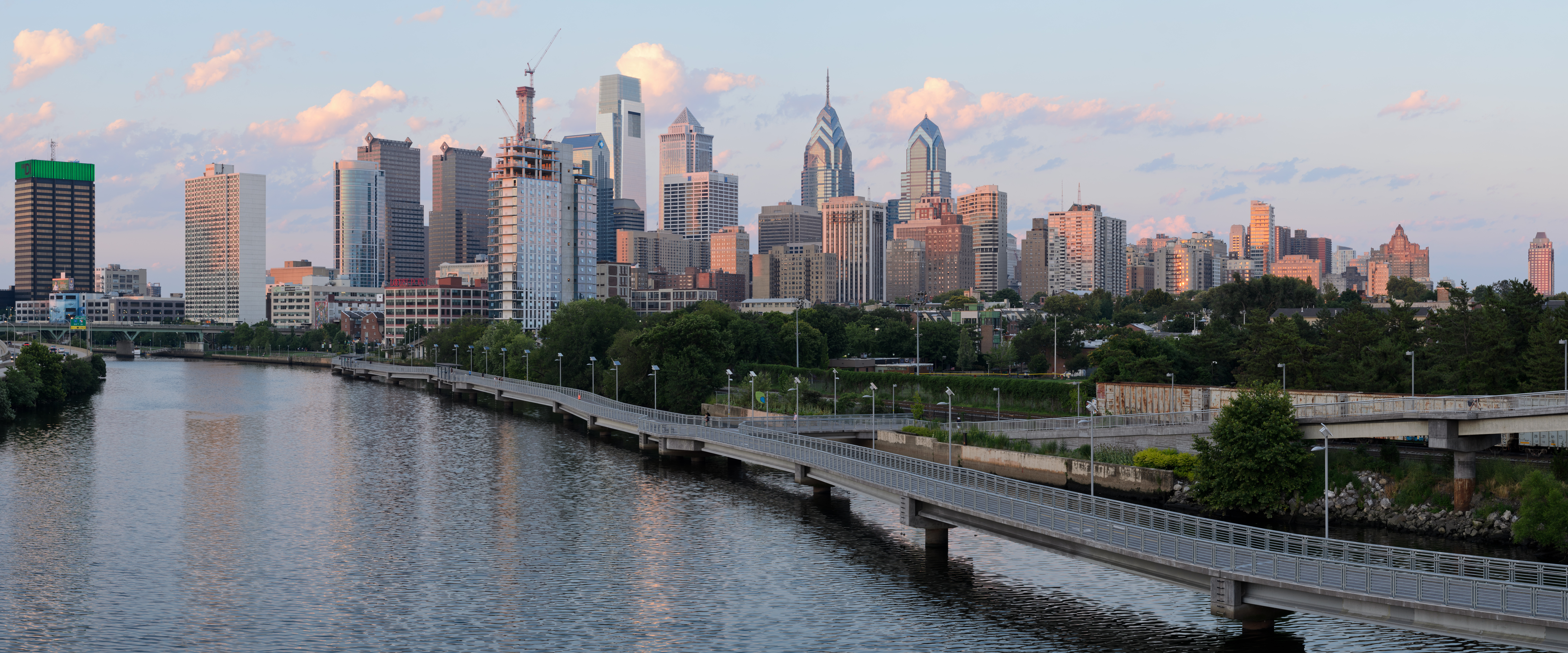
Philadelphia, the nation's sixth-largest and state's largest city

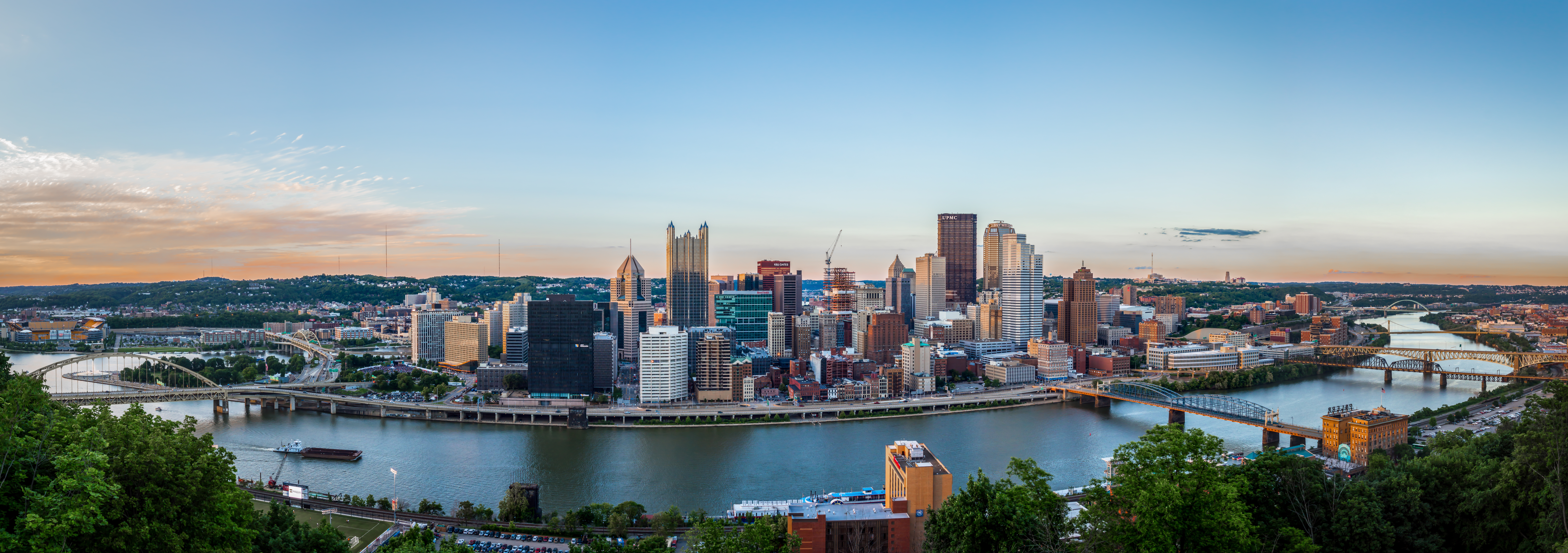
Pittsburgh, the state's second-largest city

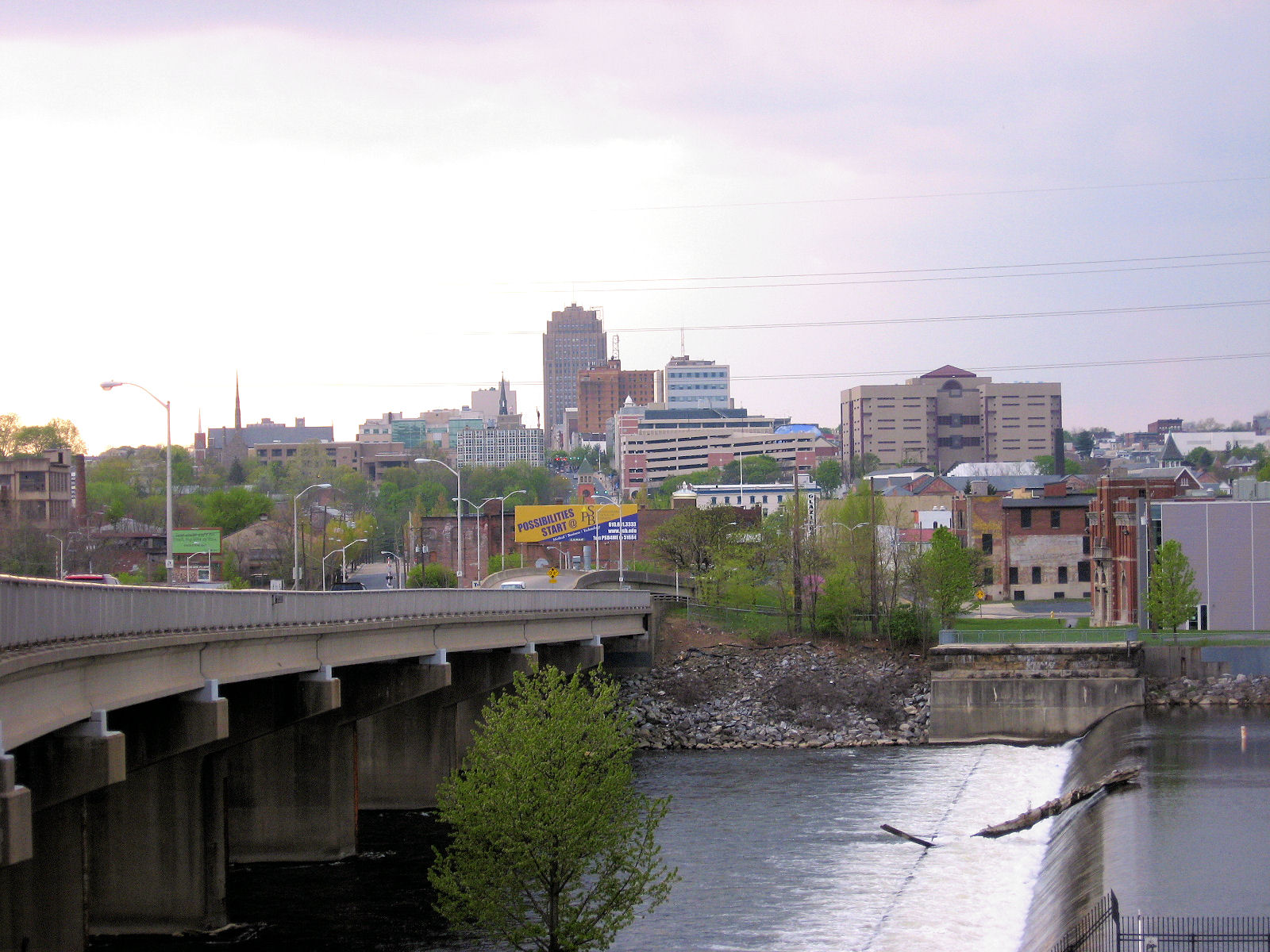
Allentown, the state's third-largest city

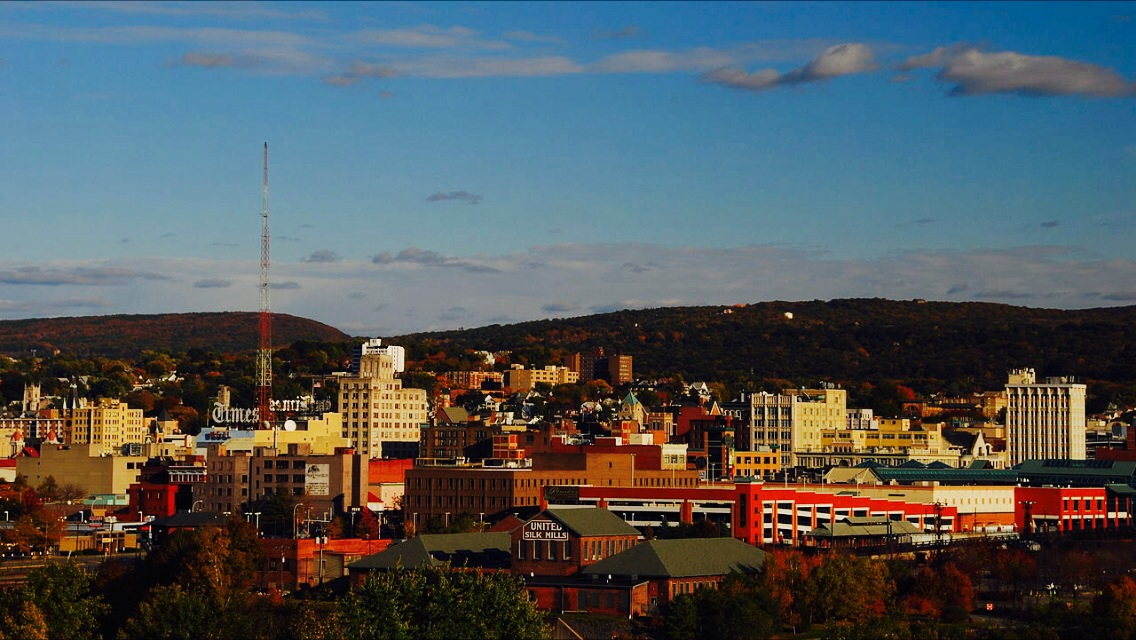
Scranton, the state's sixth-largest city

=== List ===
† -- County seat

^ -- Consolidated city-county

Rank (pop.)	Municipality	County	2018 pop. est.	Area (mi^{2})	Pop. dens. (p/mi^{2})
1	Philadelphia city†^	Philadelphia	1,587,829	142.7	10844.6
2	Pittsburgh city†	Allegheny	302,571	58.3	5248.9
3	Allentown city†	Lehigh	122,827	18.0	6600.9
4	Reading city†	Berks	95,112	10.1	8689.4
5	Erie city†	Erie	94,831	19.3	5241.3
6	Upper Darby Township	Delaware	83,566	7.8	10578.8
7	Scranton city†	Lackawanna	79,166	25.5	2968.5
8	Bethlehem city	Northampton, Lehigh	77,755	19.5	3861.1
9	Bensalem Township	Bucks	66,326	20.9	2890.4
10	Lancaster city†	Lancaster	59,698	7.4	8071.8
11	Lower Merion Township	Montgomery	58,193	23.8	2439.7
12	Abington Township	Montgomery	57,872	15.5	3579.0
13	Bristol Township	Bucks	53,909	17.2	3167.6
14	Millcreek Township	Erie	53,873	32.8	1649.5
15	Harrisburg city†	Dauphin	49,279	11.9	4153.7
16	Haverford Township	Delaware	48,689	9.9	4893.5
17	Lower Paxton Township	Dauphin	48,417	28.2	1690.1
18	York city†	York	46,827	5.3	8152.4
19	Middletown Township	Bucks	46,176	19.3	2355.4
20	Altoona city	Blair	44,728	9.9	4657.2
21	Hempfield Township	Westmoreland	43,135	76.9	561.1
22	Penn Hills Township	Allegheny	42,302	19.4	2185.4
23	State College borough	Centre	41,983	4.6	9212.9
24	Wilkes-Barre city†	Luzerne	41,243	7.3	5642.8
25	Northampton Township	Bucks	39,762	26.1	1522.2
26	Manheim Township	Lancaster	38,701	24.1	1607.7
27	Cheltenham Township	Montgomery	36,882	9.0	4077.2
28	Norristown borough†	Montgomery	34,427	3.6	9541.9
29	Falls Township	Bucks	34,249	26.6	1289.1
30	Chester city	Delaware	34,031	6.0	5666.2
31	Mt. Lebanon Township	Allegheny	33,102	6.1	5443.5
32	Warminster Township	Bucks	32,772	10.2	3218.3
33	Lower Makefield Township	Bucks	32,642	18.3	1785.3
34	Bethel Park borough	Allegheny	32,374	11.7	2773.9
35	Radnor Township	Delaware	31,532	13.8	2286.6
36	Lower Macungie Township	Lehigh	31,300	22.5	1393.5
37	Ross Township	Allegheny	31,132	14.5	2150.7
38	Ridley Township	Delaware	30,939	5.3	5825.5
39	North Huntingdon Township	Westmoreland	30,749	27.3	1125.7
40	Williamsport city†	Lycoming	29,497	9.4	3129.0
41	Tredyffrin Township	Chester	29,457	19.9	1484.0
42	Cranberry Township	Butler	29,189	70.0	411.7
43	Shaler Township	Allegheny	28,776	11.2	2576.2
44	McCandless Township	Allegheny	28,733	16.6	1730.6
45	Upper Merion Township	Montgomery	28,544	17.3	1652.6
46	Monroeville borough	Allegheny	28,386	19.7	1437.6
47	Hampden Township	Cumberland	28,203	17.9	1578.7
48	York Township	York	27,971	25.6	1090.9
49	Plum borough	Allegheny	27,395	29.0	946.0
50	Spring Township	Berks	27,376	18.5	1476.3
51	Whitehall Township	Lehigh	27,100	12.9	2106.0
52	Easton city†	Northampton	26,951	4.7	5748.9
53	Springettsbury Township	York	26,707	16.4	1630.8
54	Horsham Township	Montgomery	26,343	17.3	1520.8
55	Upper Dublin Township	Montgomery	26,098	13.3	1968.2
56	Exeter Township	Berks	25,710	24.6	1046.1
57	Lower Providence Township	Montgomery	25,623	15.5	1657.6
58	Lebanon city†	Lebanon	25,554	4.2	6132.5
59	Montgomery Township	Montgomery	25,461	10.6	2395.2
60	Hazleton city	Luzerne	25,224	6.0	4196.3
61	Derry Township	Dauphin	24,801	27.4	905.2
62	Moon Township	Allegheny	24,786	24.2	1023.5
63	Susquehanna Township	Dauphin	24,351	15.3	1594.5
64	Springfield Township	Delaware	24,255	6.3	3826.3
65	Upper Moreland Township	Montgomery	24,122	8.0	3023.9
66	Bethlehem Township	Northampton	23,862	14.6	1639.3
67	East Hempfield Township	Lancaster	23,839	21.2	1126.5
68	Swatara Township	Dauphin	23,741	15.5	1528.6
69	Warrington Township	Bucks	23,535	13.8	1706.7
70	Marple Township	Delaware	23,525	10.5	2237.1
71	New Castle city†	Lawrence	22,851	8.5	2677.6
72	West Goshen Township	Chester	22,692	12.0	1890.8
73	Unity Township	Westmoreland	22,593	67.6	334.3
74	Pottstown borough	Montgomery	22,480	5.0	4528.6
75	Peters Township	Washington	21,606	19.7	1095.3
76	Upper Providence Township	Montgomery	21,591	18.2	1188.6
77	Upper Macungie Township	Lehigh	21,549	26.3	820.5
78	Dover Township	York	21,205	41.8	507.4
79	East Pennsboro Township	Cumberland	20,827	10.7	1946.3
80	Palmer Township	Northampton	20,797	10.8	1917.5
81	Johnstown city	Cambria	20,577	6.1	3378.3
82	Coolbaugh Township	Monroe	20,504	88.0	233.1
83	Chambersburg borough†	Franklin	20,360	6.9	2940.1
84	Buckingham Township	Bucks	20,325	33.0	615.5
85	West Mifflin borough	Allegheny	20,284	14.5	1398.1
86	Murrysville borough	Westmoreland	20,219	36.8	548.8
87	Manor Township	Lancaster	19,988	48.6	411.1
88	Penn Township	Westmoreland	19,904	30.8	647.0
89	Muhlenberg Township	Berks	19,813	12.0	1650.7
90	Baldwin borough	Allegheny	19,801	5.9	3362.4
91	McKeesport city	Allegheny	19,686	5.4	3637.5
92	South Whitehall Township	Lehigh	19,486	17.2	1129.7
93	Springfield Township	Montgomery	19,484	6.8	2868.7
94	Newtown Township	Bucks	19,467	12.0	1625.0
95	Upper St. Clair Township	Allegheny	19,299	9.8	1964.1
96	Whitpain Township	Montgomery	19,088	12.9	1485.2
97	Stroud Township	Monroe	19,052	31.3	608.4
98	Lower Southampton Township	Bucks	19,003	6.7	2824.9
99	Carlisle borough†	Cumberland	18,880	5.5	3407.9
100	West Chester borough†	Chester	18,857	1.8	10215.1
101	West Manchester Township	York	18,850	20.0	941.6
102	Limerick Township	Montgomery	18,491	22.7	814.2
103	Hampton Township	Allegheny	18,452	16.2	1138.7
104	West Whiteland Township	Chester	18,411	12.9	1424.6
105	Upper Allen Township	Cumberland	18,397	13.3	1383.0
352	DuBois city (comb.)	Clearfield	18,339	56.2	326.3
106	Uwchlan Township	Chester	18,326	10.5	1752.7
107	Manchester Township	York	18,292	15.9	1150.4
108	East Goshen Township	Chester	18,152	10.2	1786.1
109	Lower Allen Township	Cumberland	18,029	10.3	1745.5
110	Towamencin Township	Montgomery	17,987	9.7	1857.8
111	Warwick Township	Lancaster	17,854	19.9	896.0
112	Ferguson Township	Centre	17,785	47.7	373.2
113	Windsor Township	York	17,698	27.3	648.5
114	Doylestown Township	Bucks	17,573	15.6	1124.3
115	Hatfield Township	Montgomery	17,506	9.9	1761.5
116	Whitemarsh Township	Montgomery	17,465	14.7	1185.4
117	Concord Township	Delaware	17,361	13.6	1272.3
118	Greene Township	Franklin	17,209	57.3	300.3
119	Harborcreek Township	Erie	17,192	34.1	504.0
120	Butler Township	Butler	17,134	21.7	787.8
121	Scott Township	Allegheny	17,017	3.9	4349.9
122	Chestnuthill Township	Monroe	16,981	37.5	452.5
123	Upper Chichester Township	Delaware	16,884	6.7	2521.1
124	Fairview Township	York	16,864	35.7	473.0
125	Lancaster Township	Lancaster	16,863	6.1	2785.4
132	Hermitage city (comb.)	Mercer	16,840	30.2	557.6
126	Aston Township	Delaware	16,819	5.8	2877.0
127	East Lampeter Township	Lancaster	16,696	19.9	837.1
128	Plymouth Township	Montgomery	16,622	8.5	1957.8
129	Phoenixville borough	Chester	16,518	3.7	4441.5
130	Lansdale borough	Montgomery	16,367	3.0	5468.4
131	West Hempfield Township	Lancaster	16,297	21.0	775.0
133	North Whitehall Township	Lehigh	15,943	28.6	558.4
134	Middle Smithfield Township	Monroe	15,927	54.3	293.1
135	Wilkinsburg borough	Allegheny	15,906	2.3	7066.2
136	Middletown Township	Delaware	15,865	13.5	1178.2
137	Upper Gwynedd Township	Montgomery	15,781	8.1	1941.6
138	White Township	Indiana	15,758	42.8	368.4
139	West Norriton Township	Montgomery	15,756	6.2	2532.7
140	Penn Township	York	15,672	13.1	1196.0
141	Patton Township	Centre	15,473	24.5	630.3
142	Upper Saucon Township	Lehigh	15,416	24.6	626.4
143	West Lampeter Township	Lancaster	15,404	16.6	927.0
144	Hanover borough	York	15,349	3.7	4133.9
145	Newberry Township	York	15,343	30.7	499.3
146	Lower Salford Township	Montgomery	15,238	14.5	1051.4
147	Cumru Township	Berks	15,207	21.2	717.9
148	Upper Southampton Township	Bucks	15,188	6.6	2290.1
149	Hilltown Township	Bucks	15,158	27.0	560.7
150	Antrim Township	Franklin	15,098	70.3	214.7
151	Forks Township	Northampton	15,053	12.3	1226.0
152	South Fayette Township	Allegheny	14,920	20.4	731.8
153	South Middleton Township	Cumberland	14,842	49.0	302.8
154	Greensburg city†	Westmoreland	14,736	4.1	3634.0
155	Bloomsburg town†	Columbia	14,633	4.7	3121.4
156	Guilford Township	Franklin	14,586	51.0	285.8
157	Warwick Township	Bucks	14,583	11.1	1312.4
158	Silver Spring Township	Cumberland	14,484	32.8	441.3
159	Derry Township	Westmoreland	14,425	96.3	149.8
160	Washington Township	Franklin	14,206	39.1	363.7
161	Pottsville city†	Schuylkill	14,129	4.2	3391.5
162	Dunmore borough	Lackawanna	14,069	9.0	1564.3
163	North Fayette Township	Allegheny	14,058	25.2	558.2
164	Caln Township	Chester	14,032	8.9	1574.0
165	East Norriton Township	Montgomery	13,991	6.1	2307.2
166	Indiana borough†	Indiana	13,953	1.8	7909.9
167	Whitehall borough	Allegheny	13,938	3.3	4191.9
168	Franklin Park borough	Allegheny	13,919	13.5	1027.6
169	Skippack Township	Montgomery	13,897	14.0	995.2
170	Sharon city	Mercer	13,815	3.8	3664.5
171	Nether Providence Township	Delaware	13,747	4.7	2911.3
172	North Strabane Township	Washington	13,738	27.4	501.4
173	Salisbury Township	Lehigh	13,632	11.3	1209.3
174	Butler City†	Butler	13,620	2.7	5009.2
175	Washington City†	Washington	13,555	2.9	4598.0
176	Robinson Township	Allegheny	13,533	15.0	900.6
177	Ephrata Borough	Lancaster	13,506	3.5	3902.3
178	South Park Township	Allegheny	13,503	9.3	1456.6
179	Elizabeth Township	Allegheny	13,292	23.3	571.3
180	Meadville City†	Crawford	13,263	4.4	3028.8
181	Franconia Township	Montgomery	13,205	13.9	953.2
182	Coatesville City	Chester	13,198	1.8	7184.9
183	Kingston borough	Luzerne	13,131	2.2	5947.0
184	Richland Township	Bucks	13,115	20.8	631.6
185	Lower Moreland Township	Montgomery	13,093	7.3	1798.2
186	New Kensington city	Westmoreland	12,962	4.2	3081.1
187	St. Marys city	Elk	12,913	99.5	129.7
188	Spring Garden Township	York	12,851	6.8	1894.6
189	Amity Township	Berks	12,708	18.5	687.6
190	Richland Township	Cambria	12,636	20.6	612.7
191	North Union Township	Fayette	12,630	20.8	608.4
192	Plumstead Township	Bucks	12,627	27.3	462.8
193	Hopewell Township	Beaver	12,596	26.8	470.4
194	West Bradford Township	Chester	12,439	18.6	668.9
195	Adams Township	Butler	12,361	22.4	551.3
196	Logan Township	Blair	12,332	46.7	263.9
197	Newtown Township	Delaware	12,275	10.1	1216.4
198	Lower Pottsgrove Township	Montgomery	12,136	8.0	1510.2
199	Somerset Township	Somerset	12,102	32.2	375.9
200	New Garden Township	Chester	12,084	16.3	742.1
201	Pine Township	Allegheny	11,878	17.0	699.7
202	West Deer Township	Allegheny	11,854	28.9	410.5
203	Dingman Township	Pike	11,842	60.1	197.2
204	Center Township	Beaver	11,781	15.3	767.5
205	New Hanover Township	Montgomery	11,703	21.7	539.8
206	Lower Burrell city	Westmoreland	11,642	11.5	1010.6
207	North Lebanon Township	Lebanon	11,593	16.9	687.1
208	Cecil Township	Washington	11,589	26.4	439.4
209	Elizabethtown borough	Lancaster	11,560	2.7	4349.1
210	Lower Gwynedd Township	Montgomery	11,515	9.3	1236.7
211	Yeadon borough	Delaware	11,496	1.6	7207.5
212	Upper Uwchlan Township	Chester	11,436	11.7	975.6
213	Richland Township	Allegheny	11,390	14.6	778.5
214	Munhall borough	Allegheny	11,380	2.4	4767.5
215	Emmaus borough	Lehigh	11,307	2.9	3901.7
216	Rostraver Township	Westmoreland	11,291	33.0	342.7
217	North Middleton Township	Cumberland	11,276	23.5	479.2
218	Salisbury Township	Lancaster	11,211	41.9	267.3
219	Loyalsock Township	Lycoming	11,207	21.5	521.4
220	Hanover Township	Northampton	11,098	6.6	1687.9
221	Hanover Township	Luzerne	11,078	19.2	576.5
222	New Britain Township	Bucks	11,074	15.3	724.4
223	Jefferson Hills borough	Allegheny	10,990	16.7	658.8
224	Pocono Township	Monroe	10,981	34.4	319.0
225	Hamilton Township	Franklin	10,964	35.5	308.5
226	Westtown Township	Chester	10,885	8.7	1245.7
227	Rapho Township	Lancaster	10,822	47.8	226.5
228	Lower Saucon Township	Northampton	10,798	24.5	440.6
229	Mount Pleasant Township	Westmoreland	10,784	56.1	192.3
230	South Union Township	Fayette	10,701	16.8	637.1
231	Darby borough	Delaware	10,682	0.8	12686.5
232	East Whiteland Township	Chester	10,655	11.0	968.4
233	Waynesboro borough	Franklin	10,633	3.4	3116.4
235	Lansdowne borough	Delaware	10,621	1.2	8993.2
236	Willistown Township	Chester	10,576	18.3	578.9
237	Lehman Township	Pike	10,563	50.4	209.7
238	Easttown Township	Chester	10,544	8.3	1275.4
239	Lehigh Township	Northampton	10,496	29.9	351.6
240	Wyomissing borough	Berks	10,476	4.5	2328.5
241	Harrison Township	Allegheny	10,468	7.9	1327.6
242	Nanticoke city	Luzerne	10,419	3.5	2939.9
243	Coal Township	Northumberland	10,404	26.5	393.2
244	Columbia borough	Lancaster	10,381	2.4	4286.1
245	East Cocalico Township	Lancaster	10,379	20.6	504.1
246	Oil City city	Venango	10,375	4.8	2144.5
247	Berwick borough	Columbia	10,365	3.3	3186.3
248	Douglass Township	Montgomery	10,312	15.3	674.1
249	Upper Providence Township	Delaware	10,269	5.8	1767.8
250	Uniontown city†	Fayette	10,231	2.0	5012.7
251	Mount Joy Township	Lancaster	10,206	28.0	364.3
252	North Versailles Township	Allegheny	10,203	8.2	1246.1
253	Fairview Township	Erie	10,200	29.2	349.8
254	Worcester Township	Montgomery	10,050	16.2	619.3
255	East Bradford Township	Chester	9,989	15.2	659.1
256	Ephrata Township	Lancaster	9,960	16.4	606.1
257	Plains Township	Luzerne	9,936	13.2	754.8
258	Northampton borough	Northampton	9,935	2.6	3806.5
259	Milford Township	Bucks	9,928	28.0	355.0
260	East Stroudsburg borough	Monroe	9,867	2.9	3450.0
261	Sunbury city†	Northumberland	9,835	2.2	4546.9
262	Lock Haven city†	Clinton	9,797	2.7	3672.0
263	Penn Forest Township	Carbon	9,709	74.9	129.7
264	Bristol borough	Bucks	9,686	1.9	5221.6
265	Brentwood borough	Allegheny	9,620	1.4	6643.6
266	Hazle Township	Luzerne	9,598	45.3	211.7
267	South Lebanon Township	Lebanon	9,579	21.7	440.6
268	West Hanover Township	Dauphin	9,539	23.2	410.9
269	Jeannette city	Westmoreland	9,530	2.4	3990.8
269	Warren city†	Warren	9,530	3.1	3086.1
271	College Township	Centre	9,518	18.6	512.7
272	South Strabane Township	Washington	9,513	23.0	413.5
273	Neshannock Township	Lawrence	9,509	17.4	545.8
274	Lititz borough	Lancaster	9,385	2.3	4057.5
275	Butler Township	Luzerne	9,381	33.6	279.1
276	Aliquippa city	Beaver	9,351	4.6	2034.6
277	Darby Township	Delaware	9,272	1.4	6515.8
278	Maidencreek Township	Berks	9,258	14.8	624.4
279	Moore Township	Northampton	9,239	37.6	245.9
280	Perkiomen Township	Montgomery	9,198	4.9	1864.6
281	South Abington Township	Lackawanna	9,142	9.2	988.4
282	Economy borough	Beaver	9,078	17.9	506.2
283	West Caln Township	Chester	9,067	21.9	413.6
284	Dallas Township	Luzerne	9,057	18.7	483.6
285	Bethel Township	Delaware	9,028	5.4	1668.5
286	Penn Township	Lancaster	8,998	29.7	302.8
287	Hamilton Township	Monroe	8,991	38.5	233.5
288	Canonsburg borough	Washington	8,983	2.3	3888.7
289	Mechanicsburg borough	Cumberland	8,968	2.4	3718.1
290	Swissvale borough	Allegheny	8,967	1.2	7214.0
291	Quakertown borough	Bucks	8,957	2.0	4397.2
292	North Codorus Township	York	8,911	32.3	276.0
293	Middletown borough	Dauphin	8,877	2.1	4251.4
294	Carbondale city	Lackawanna	8,873	3.2	2736.0
295	Upper Leacock Township	Lancaster	8,809	18.2	482.9
296	East Nottingham Township	Chester	8,795	20.1	436.6
297	Beaver Falls city	Beaver	8,785	2.4	3736.7
298	Collingdale borough	Delaware	8,783	0.9	10107.0
299	Morrisville borough	Bucks	8,700	2.0	4411.8
300	Solebury Township	Bucks	8,699	27.2	320.4
301	Bradford city	McKean	8,683	3.4	2537.4
302	Dormont borough	Allegheny	8,577	0.8	11285.5
303	Schuylkill Township	Chester	8,536	8.9	957.8
304	Tobyhanna Township	Monroe	8,531	52.6	162.2
305	Perkasie borough	Bucks	8,523	2.6	3324.1
306	O'Hara Township	Allegheny	8,443	7.4	1145.4
307	West Donegal Township	Lancaster	8,414	15.9	530.5
308	Doylestown borough†	Bucks	8,365	2.2	3874.5
309	Lewistown borough†	Mifflin	8,360	2.1	4078.0
310	Bellevue borough	Allegheny	8,352	1.1	7437.2
311	Canton Township	Washington	8,341	14.9	561.0
312	Lower Swatara Township	Dauphin	8,318	14.8	561.8
313	Jackson Township	Lebanon	8,309	24.1	344.3
314	Bushkill Township	Northampton	8,306	25.3	328.9
315	Castle Shannon borough	Allegheny	8,304	1.6	5199.7
316	Allegheny Township	Westmoreland	8,290	31.9	259.9
317	Millersville borough	Lancaster	8,288	2.0	4245.9
317	Pleasant Hills borough	Allegheny	8,288	2.8	2984.5
317	Old Forge borough	Lackawanna	8,288	3.4	2426.9
320	Upper Makefield Township	Bucks	8,254	21.8	378.6
321	Brighton Township	Beaver	8,240	19.4	423.8
322	Latrobe city	Westmoreland	8,235	2.3	3555.7
323	Grove City borough	Mercer	8,232	2.7	3051.1
324	Southampton Township	Franklin	8,226	38.2	215.1
325	North Londonderry Township	Lebanon	8,202	10.8	761.8
366	Shenango Township (comb.)	Lawrence	8,116	24.8	327.3
326	Thornbury Township	Delaware	8,113	9.3	875.3
327	Brookhaven borough	Delaware	8,042	1.7	4702.9
328	Maxatawny Township	Berks	8,004	26.0	308.4
329	East Donegal Township	Lancaster	7,983	23.8	336.0
330	Carnegie borough	Allegheny	7,961	1.6	4923.3
331	West Earl Township	Lancaster	7,959	17.9	443.6
332	London Grove Township	Chester	7,938	17.3	460.0
333	West Manheim Township	York	7,935	20.1	394.8
334	North Coventry Township	Chester	7,926	13.5	586.7
335	Downingtown borough	Chester	7,923	2.2	3562.5
336	Chartiers Township	Washington	7,913	24.6	321.5
337	East Huntingdon Township	Westmoreland	7,912	33.0	240.0
338	Camp Hill borough	Cumberland	7,871	2.1	3709.2
339	Conshohocken borough	Montgomery	7,867	1.0	7608.3
340	Wilson borough	Northampton	7,858	1.2	6745.1
340	White Oak borough	Allegheny	7,858	6.7	1178.3
342	Center Township	Butler	7,855	24.4	321.4
343	Honey Brook Township	Chester	7,850	25.2	311.8
344	Mount Joy borough	Lancaster	7,848	2.4	3233.6
345	Kennett Township	Chester	7,809	15.5	504.4
346	Kennedy Township	Allegheny	7,805	5.5	1411.4
346	Polk Township	Monroe	7,805	31.2	250.3
348	Ellwood City borough (comb.)	Lawrence, Beaver	7,780	2.4	3299.4
349	Conewago Township	York	7,749	24.6	314.8
350	Chippewa Township	Beaver	7,741	15.7	493.4
351	Pittston city	Luzerne	7,716	1.7	4522.9
353	North Cornwall Township	Lebanon	7,698	9.5	810.5
354	Gettysburg borough†	Adams	7,645	1.7	4588.8
355	Monessen city	Westmoreland	7,625	3.0	2521.5
356	Spring Township	Centre	7,620	27.1	280.8
357	Lawrence Township	Clearfield	7,606	83.3	91.4
358	Connellsville city	Fayette	7,583	2.3	3317.1
359	Jackson Township	York	7,573	22.8	332.0
360	East Fallowfield Township	Chester	7,530	15.6	482.2
361	New Sewickley Township	Beaver	7,487	32.7	229.0
362	Upper Milford Township	Lehigh	7,436	18.0	412.9
363	West Brandywine Township	Chester	7,435	13.3	560.9
364	Collier Township	Allegheny	7,433	13.9	533.7
365	Frankstown Township	Blair	7,422	49.3	150.7
367	Palmyra borough	Lebanon	7,419	1.9	3852.0
368	Lower Windsor Township	York	7,399	25.0	295.8
369	Hatboro borough	Montgomery	7,382	1.4	5191.3
370	Washington Township	Westmoreland	7,370	32.8	224.6
371	Smithfield Township	Monroe	7,348	23.5	312.0
372	Derry Township	Mifflin	7,341	31.0	236.8
373	South Heidelberg Township	Berks	7,335	13.8	529.8
374	Brecknock Township	Lancaster	7,327	24.9	294.6
375	East Manchester Township	York	7,323	17.2	426.2
376	Shamokin city	Northumberland	7,316	0.8	8772.2
377	Buffalo Township	Butler	7,315	24.4	300.4
377	Delaware Township	Pike	7,315	45.5	160.9
379	Indiana Township	Allegheny	7,309	17.6	416.0
380	West Cocalico Township	Lancaster	7,308	27.6	264.7
381	Robeson Township	Berks	7,301	34.2	213.3
382	East Brandywine Township	Chester	7,279	11.3	646.7
383	New Cumberland borough	Cumberland	7,260	1.7	4308.6
384	Marshall Township	Allegheny	7,255	15.5	469.4
385	East Pikeland Township	Chester	7,250	8.9	815.2
386	Conemaugh Township	Somerset	7,205	41.8	172.2
387	Middlesex Township	Cumberland	7,187	26.0	276.8
388	Valley Township	Chester	7,180	6.0	1203.5
389	South Londonderry Township	Lebanon	7,162	24.4	293.8
390	Glenolden borough	Delaware	7,157	1.0	7340.5
391	East Marlborough Township	Chester	7,154	15.5	460.2
392	Franklin Township	Greene	7,131	19.2	370.7
393	Earl Township	Lancaster	7,106	22.1	321.5
394	Conewago Township	Adams	7,096	10.5	676.8
395	Archbald borough	Lackawanna	7,083	17.1	414.2
396	Dunbar Township	Fayette	7,078	59.5	118.9
397	Huntingdon borough†	Huntingdon	7,073	3.7	1906.5
398	Kingston Township	Luzerne	7,027	13.9	505.0
399	Milton borough	Northumberland	7,025	3.7	1884.4
400	Ridley Park borough	Delaware	7,006	1.1	6463.1
401	Tamaqua borough	Schuylkill	7,003	9.7	720.6
402	Ambridge borough	Beaver	6,984	1.7	4127.7
403	Jackson Township	Monroe	6,968	29.9	233.1
404	Providence Township	Lancaster	6,932	20.0	346.4
405	Bullskin Township	Fayette	6,921	43.6	158.6
406	Bedminster Township	Bucks	6,881	31.2	220.3
407	Bern Township	Berks	6,860	20.2	340.4
408	East Vincent Township	Chester	6,851	13.7	501.9
409	Upper Mount Bethel Township	Northampton	6,834	44.2	154.5
410	California borough	Washington	6,816	11.2	606.9
411	Tunkhannock Township	Monroe	6,772	38.8	174.4
412	Clairton city	Allegheny	6,767	3.0	2240.0
413	West View borough	Allegheny	6,759	1.0	6692.1
414	East Coventry Township	Chester	6,745	10.9	618.2
415	Allegheny Township	Blair	6,727	29.6	227.1
416	Summit Township	Erie	6,725	24.1	279.5
417	Washington Township	Lehigh	6,718	23.7	283.0
418	Upper Hanover Township	Montgomery	6,668	21.2	314.9
419	Clifton Heights borough	Delaware	6,654	0.6	10561.9
420	Southampton Township	Cumberland	6,647	51.6	128.8
421	Souderton borough	Montgomery	6,642	1.1	5925.1
422	East Earl Township	Lancaster	6,624	24.7	267.7
423	Folcroft borough	Delaware	6,611	1.4	4652.4
424	Cranberry Township	Venango	6,608	22.8	289.5
424	Shrewsbury Township	York	6,608	29.1	227.3
424	Salem Township	Westmoreland	6,608	47.4	139.3
427	Corry city	Erie	6,560	6.0	1091.9
428	Georges Township	Fayette	6,556	47.6	137.7
428	Ligonier Township	Westmoreland	6,556	92.7	70.7
430	Blakely borough	Lackawanna	6,549	3.8	1717.5
431	Benner Township	Centre	6,541	28.4	230.7
432	Cumberland Township	Greene	6,522	38.9	167.6
433	Forest Hills borough	Allegheny	6,512	1.6	4163.7
434	South Hanover Township	Dauphin	6,503	11.4	570.4
435	Clay Township	Lancaster	6,500	22.7	285.8
436	Ambler borough	Montgomery	6,497	0.9	7625.6
437	Catasauqua borough	Lehigh	6,492	1.3	4884.9
438	Antis Township	Blair	6,481	61.1	106.1
439	Prospect Park borough	Delaware	6,470	0.7	8731.4
440	Edinboro borough	Erie	6,447	2.4	2680.7
441	Franklin city†	Venango	6,445	4.8	1341.6
442	North East Township	Erie	6,410	42.4	151.2
443	South Williamsport borough	Lycoming	6,394	2.2	2957.4
443	East Buffalo Township	Union	6,394	15.2	421.7
445	Oakmont borough	Allegheny	6,380	1.8	3602.5
446	Wilkins Township	Allegheny	6,358	2.7	2316.2
447	Upper Nazareth Township	Northampton	6,353	7.3	866.2
448	Stowe Township	Allegheny	6,350	2.3	2764.5
449	Red Lion borough	York	6,335	1.3	4832.2
450	Bellefonte borough†	Centre	6,311	1.9	3411.4
451	Taylor borough	Lackawanna	6,253	5.2	1202.0
452	Swarthmore borough	Delaware	6,190	1.4	4421.4
453	Somerset borough†	Somerset	6,182	2.7	2265.3
454	Cumberland Township	Adams	6,168	33.6	183.5
455	Plainfield Township	Northampton	6,153	25.0	246.3
456	Clearfield borough†	Clearfield	6,132	1.9	3260.0
457	Montgomery Township	Franklin	6,126	67.4	90.8
458	Chanceford Township	York	6,121	48.5	126.3
459	Kennett Square borough	Chester	6,113	1.1	5707.7
460	McKees Rocks borough	Allegheny	6,090	1.1	5437.5
461	Dickson City borough	Lackawanna	6,063	4.8	1264.4
462	Carroll Township	York	6,045	13.8	438.7
463	Cambria Township	Cambria	6,043	50.2	120.4
464	Hellam Township	York	6,034	28.3	213.6
465	New Brighton borough	Beaver	5,986	1.1	5339.9
466	Luzerne Township	Fayette	5,976	30.7	194.4
467	Steelton borough	Dauphin	5,960	1.9	3143.5
468	Crafton borough	Allegheny	5,949	1.1	5204.7
469	Sewickley Township	Westmoreland	5,943	27.0	220.4
470	St. Thomas Township	Franklin	5,937	51.9	114.4
471	Plymouth borough	Luzerne	5,925	1.2	5004.2
472	Williams Township	Northampton	5,924	18.6	318.1
473	Punxsutawney borough	Jefferson	5,904	3.4	1727.8
474	Greenville borough	Mercer	5,895	1.9	3124.0
475	Monroe Township	Cumberland	5,892	26.3	224.0
476	Norwood borough	Delaware	5,891	0.8	7237.1
476	Adams Township	Cambria	5,891	46.2	127.5
478	Ross Township	Monroe	5,884	22.9	256.6
479	Hellertown borough	Northampton	5,867	1.3	4458.2
480	Mount Carmel borough	Northumberland	5,850	0.7	8904.1
481	East Hanover Township	Dauphin	5,849	40.2	145.4
482	Hollidaysburg borough†	Blair	5,826	2.3	2481.3
483	Reading Township	Adams	5,791	26.7	216.6
484	New London Township	Chester	5,779	11.7	492.2
485	Lewisburg borough†	Union	5,763	1.0	5922.9
486	Union Township	Washington	5,749	15.7	365.0
487	Monaca borough	Beaver	5,741	2.4	2410.2
488	Moosic borough	Lackawanna	5,735	6.5	879.1
489	South Huntingdon Township	Westmoreland	5,729	45.8	125.1
490	East Rockhill Township	Bucks	5,727	13.1	437.5
491	Nazareth borough	Northampton	5,721	1.7	3427.8
492	Lower Nazareth Township	Northampton	5,720	13.4	426.3
493	Charlestown Township	Chester	5,704	12.5	455.4
494	Longswamp Township	Berks	5,698	22.9	248.7
495	Sharon Hill borough	Delaware	5,696	0.8	7378.2
496	Wright Township	Luzerne	5,670	13.3	425.8
497	Coraopolis borough	Allegheny	5,664	1.5	3876.8
498	Exeter borough	Luzerne	5,641	5.0	1128.4
499	Carroll Township	Washington	5,625	34.5	162.9
500	Ohio Township	Allegheny	5,609	6.9	817.9
501	Lower Heidelberg Township	Berks	5,602	15.4	362.9
502	North Sewickley Township	Beaver	5,593	21.1	265.4
503	Slippery Rock Township	Butler	5,592	25.7	217.6
504	Selinsgrove borough	Snyder	5,583	1.9	2938.4
505	West Pennsboro Township	Cumberland	5,578	30.3	184.2
506	Vernon Township	Crawford	5,564	29.6	188.2
507	Duquesne city	Allegheny	5,558	2.0	2729.9
508	Sayre borough	Bradford	5,557	2.0	2729.4
509	Quincy Township	Franklin	5,547	45.2	122.7
510	Stroudsburg borough†	Monroe	5,546	1.7	3183.7
511	Oxford Township	Adams	5,529	9.7	568.1
512	Redstone Township	Fayette	5,528	22.8	242.2
513	Titusville city	Crawford	5,501	2.9	1896.2
514	Shippensburg borough (comb.)	Cumberland, Franklin	5,500	2.0	2758.3
515	Jefferson Township	Butler	5,473	23.0	238.3
516	Penn Township	Chester	5,466	9.7	566.4
517	Newport Township	Luzerne	5,454	17.2	317.3
518	Tyrone borough	Blair	5,451	2.0	2678.6
519	Shippensburg Township	Cumberland	5,450	2.5	2154.2
520	Kelly Township	Union	5,436	17.2	316.0
521	Lehighton borough	Carbon	5,435	1.7	3291.9
522	Middlesex Township	Butler	5,433	23.2	234.0
523	Hopewell Township	York	5,432	20.6	264.3
524	New Holland borough	Lancaster	5,409	1.9	2782.4
524	Fox Chapel borough	Allegheny	5,409	7.9	686.9
526	Palmerton borough	Carbon	5,377	2.5	2121.1
526	Upper Pottsgrove Township	Montgomery	5,377	5.1	1064.5
528	Upper Yoder Township	Cambria	5,365	12.2	438.7
529	Schuylkill Haven borough	Schuylkill	5,360	1.4	3817.7
530	Media borough†	Delaware	5,335	0.8	7001.3
530	Turtle Creek borough	Allegheny	5,335	1.0	5500.0
532	Bedford Township	Bedford	5,317	68.3	77.8
533	West Rockhill Township	Bucks	5,295	16.4	322.3
534	Leacock Township	Lancaster	5,291	20.6	256.5
535	Dickinson Township	Cumberland	5,273	46.0	114.6
536	Springfield Township	York	5,268	26.7	197.6
537	Shillington borough	Berks	5,261	1.0	5451.8
538	Lower Oxford Township	Chester	5,254	18.5	283.6
539	Paradise Township	Lancaster	5,251	18.7	280.7
540	Bangor borough	Northampton	5,249	1.5	3415.1
541	Athens Township	Bradford	5,246	45.0	116.5
542	Carroll Township	Perry	5,240	15.0	349.2
543	Sugarcreek borough	Venango	5,238	38.7	135.5
544	Londonderry Township	Dauphin	5,221	26.9	193.9
545	Martic Township	Lancaster	5,210	32.6	159.7
546	Lake Township	Wayne	5,203	29.8	174.4
547	Olyphant borough	Lackawanna	5,188	5.5	943.1
548	West Mead Township	Crawford	5,182	18.8	275.9
549	Findlay Township	Allegheny	5,171	32.3	160.1
550	Birdsboro borough	Berks	5,163	1.4	3782.4
551	Clarion borough†	Clarion	5,154	1.6	3185.4
552	Washington Township	Northampton	5,149	18.0	286.6
553	Collegeville borough	Montgomery	5,144	1.6	3191.1
554	Bridgeville borough	Allegheny	5,142	1.1	4687.3
555	Vandergrift borough	Westmoreland	5,140	1.4	3619.7
556	Pine Township	Mercer	5,133	25.7	199.9
557	Butler Township	Schuylkill	5,127	26.1	196.7
558	Clarks Summit borough	Lackawanna	5,118	1.6	3229.0
559	Oxford borough	Chester	5,117	2.0	2598.8
560	Union Township	Lawrence	5,111	9.6	531.6
561	Granville Township	Mifflin	5,106	41.1	124.1
562	Wayne Township	Schuylkill	5,101	35.2	144.9
563	Bethel Township	Lebanon	5,096	34.6	147.2
564	Arnold city	Westmoreland	5,095	0.8	6198.3
564	Scott Township	Columbia	5,095	7.5	682.6
566	Colebrookdale Township	Berks	5,091	8.5	601.7
567	Westmont borough	Cambria	5,083	2.3	2164.8
567	Girard Township	Erie	5,083	31.8	160.1
569	Harris Township	Centre	5,073	31.2	162.5
570	Penn Township	Butler	5,060	24.3	208.3
571	German Township	Fayette	5,056	33.9	149.4
572	Lackawaxen Township	Pike	5,054	81.2	62.2
573	Swoyersville Borough	Luzerne	5,052	2.1	2377.4
574	Springfield Township	Bucks	5,047	30.7	164.5
575	Weisenberg Township	Lehigh	5,023	26.8	187.3
576	Old Lycoming Township	Lycoming	5,021	9.4	531.8
577	Middle Paxton Township	Dauphin	5,013	59.1	84.8
578	Kutztown borough	Berks	5,004	1.6	3049.4
579	Shenandoah borough	Schuylkill	4,998	1.6	3167.3
580	Gregg Township	Union	4,958	15.1	328.0
581	Scott Township	Lackawanna	4,935	27.6	179.0
582	Duryea borough	Luzerne	4,932	5.7	859.4
583	Straban Township	Adams	4,927	34.5	143.0
584	East Allen Township	Northampton	4,905	14.7	334.3
585	Telford borough	Montgomery, Bucks	4,879	1.0	4769.3
585	Farrell city	Mercer	4,879	2.3	2131.5
587	Franklin Township	York	4,877	23.8	204.8
588	Franklin Township	Adams	4,876	68.5	71.2
589	Lower Frederick Township	Montgomery	4,874	8.1	599.8
590	East Caln Township	Chester	4,871	3.7	1323.3
591	Summit Township	Butler	4,865	22.5	215.9
592	Manheim borough	Lancaster	4,861	1.4	3472.1
593	North Braddock borough	Allegheny	4,847	1.6	3121.1
594	West Pittston borough	Luzerne	4,846	1.0	5016.6
595	Peach Bottom Township	York	4,836	29.8	162.5
596	Annville Township	Lebanon	4,832	1.6	2979.0
597	Bradford Township	McKean	4,825	56.4	85.5
598	Edwardsville borough	Luzerne	4,802	1.2	4025.1
599	West Vincent Township	Chester	4,787	17.8	268.3
600	Royersford borough	Montgomery	4,783	0.8	5811.7
601	Caernarvon Township	Lancaster	4,767	23.1	206.6
602	Blooming Grove Township	Pike	4,766	77.0	61.9
603	Kiskiminetas Township	Armstrong	4,752	41.0	115.8
604	Donora borough	Washington	4,745	2.0	2316.9
605	Jim Thorpe borough†	Carbon	4,744	14.9	318.0
606	Center Township	Indiana	4,714	40.6	116.1
607	Greene Township	Erie	4,708	37.5	125.5
608	Avalon borough	Allegheny	4,695	0.7	6794.5
609	Mount Pleasant Township	Adams	4,692	30.6	153.4
610	Pocopson Township	Chester	4,683	8.3	562.5
611	Danville borough†	Montour	4,661	1.6	2963.1
612	Jessup borough	Lackawanna	4,658	6.8	686.4
613	Montoursville borough	Lycoming	4,627	4.2	1106.4
614	Jackson Township	Luzerne	4,623	13.4	345.6
615	Fountain Hill borough	Lehigh	4,622	0.8	6130.0
615	Pequea Township	Lancaster	4,622	13.6	339.7
617	Swatara Township	Lebanon	4,618	21.6	214.1
618	Lemoyne borough	Cumberland	4,611	1.6	2860.4
619	Brecknock Township	Berks	4,608	17.8	259.5
620	North Franklin Township	Washington	4,588	7.5	615.1
621	West York borough	York	4,587	0.5	8720.5
622	West Hazleton borough	Luzerne	4,573	1.5	3050.7
623	Bridgeport borough	Montgomery	4,570	0.7	6418.5
624	White Deer Township	Union	4,567	46.4	98.4
625	Blair Township	Blair	4,553	13.7	332.5
626	Warrington Township	York	4,549	36.1	126.0
627	New Freedom borough	York	4,525	2.1	2174.4
627	Decatur Township	Clearfield	4,525	37.6	120.3
629	Fairview Township	Luzerne	4,524	9.4	479.1
630	Hummelstown borough	Dauphin	4,523	1.3	3452.7
631	Tarentum borough	Allegheny	4,521	1.4	3247.8
632	Smithfield Township	Huntingdon	4,520	5.6	806.7
633	East Petersburg borough	Lancaster	4,513	1.2	3732.8
634	Walker Township	Centre	4,509	38.4	117.6
635	Beaver borough†	Beaver	4,487	1.1	3995.5
636	Lower Alsace Township	Berks	4,481	4.8	937.1
637	Towamensing Township	Carbon	4,480	28.9	154.9
638	Delaware Township	Northumberland	4,478	31.4	142.7
639	Glassport borough	Allegheny	4,470	1.8	2501.4
640	Jenkins Township	Luzerne	4,468	14.0	319.6
641	Larksville borough	Luzerne	4,467	4.9	919.3
642	Washington Township	Erie	4,463	45.6	97.8
643	Smith Township	Washington	4,455	34.5	129.3
644	Mount Pleasant borough	Westmoreland	4,447	1.0	4442.6
645	Jenkintown borough	Montgomery	4,443	0.6	7660.3
646	Peters Township	Franklin	4,436	55.9	79.4
647	Littlestown borough	Adams	4,434	1.5	2950.1
648	McKean Township	Erie	4,432	37.0	119.9
649	Green Tree borough	Allegheny	4,431	2.1	2135.4
650	West Penn Township	Schuylkill	4,422	58.0	76.2
651	Franklin Township	Chester	4,421	13.1	336.4
652	Allen Township	Northampton	4,393	11.2	393.6
653	Conneaut Township	Erie	4,365	43.4	100.5
654	Jersey Shore borough	Lycoming	4,364	1.2	3692.0
655	Sharpsville borough	Mercer	4,349	1.4	3099.8
656	Burrell Township	Indiana	4,347	24.4	178.2
657	Ralpho Township	Northumberland	4,342	18.5	234.7
658	Honesdale borough†	Wayne	4,341	4.0	1079.3
659	Minersville borough	Schuylkill	4,332	0.7	6593.6
660	Scottdale borough	Westmoreland	4,329	1.2	3738.3
661	Penn Township	Snyder	4,327	17.8	242.7
662	Tunkhannock Township	Wyoming	4,324	31.5	137.3
663	Jackson Township	Cambria	4,319	48.0	90.0
664	Fallowfield Township	Washington	4,308	21.3	202.1
665	Narberth borough	Montgomery	4,295	0.5	8538.8
666	Cresson Township	Cambria	4,292	12.0	356.3
666	Foster Township	McKean	4,292	47.0	91.4
668	Lynn Township	Lehigh	4,290	41.5	103.3
669	Hamburg borough	Berks	4,285	1.9	2200.8
670	Mahoning Township	Carbon	4,284	23.8	180.2
671	Monongahela city	Washington	4,264	2.1	1999.1
672	Slatington borough	Lehigh	4,262	1.4	3092.9
673	North East borough	Erie	4,259	1.3	3268.6
674	Salem Township	Luzerne	4,253	30.0	141.8
675	Sellersville borough	Bucks	4,244	1.2	3630.5
676	Franklin Township	Carbon	4,242	15.7	270.7
677	Manor Township	Armstrong	4,237	17.1	247.2
678	Sugarloaf Township	Luzerne	4,235	22.5	188.5
679	Birmingham Township	Chester	4,234	6.4	658.5
680	Strasburg Township	Lancaster	4,214	20.1	209.2
681	Mahoning Township	Montour	4,206	8.9	474.0
682	West Reading borough	Berks	4,204	0.6	7053.7
683	Forty Fort borough	Luzerne	4,192	1.6	2663.3
684	Menallen Township	Fayette	4,173	21.3	195.6
685	Salem Township	Wayne	4,171	31.4	132.7
686	Cornwall borough	Lebanon	4,170	9.8	427.4
687	Barrett Township	Monroe	4,168	53.0	78.7
688	Greenfield Township	Blair	4,164	36.3	114.9
689	Upper Paxton Township	Dauphin	4,163	31.2	133.3
690	Little Britain Township	Lancaster	4,162	27.5	151.1
691	Aldan borough	Delaware	4,151	0.6	6953.1
692	Connoquenessing Township	Butler	4,132	22.7	181.7
693	Pine Grove Township	Schuylkill	4,130	38.0	108.8
694	Ruscombmanor Township	Berks	4,129	13.7	300.5
694	Heidelberg Township	Lebanon	4,129	24.2	170.3
696	Bethel Township	Berks	4,122	42.3	97.4
697	Waynesburg borough†	Greene	4,121	0.8	5151.3
698	Mahanoy City borough	Schuylkill	4,119	0.5	8076.5
699	Baden borough	Beaver	4,101	2.5	1651.0
700	Throop borough	Lackawanna	4,097	5.0	824.7
701	Tinicum Township	Delaware	4,095	8.8	466.2
702	Chester Township	Delaware	4,092	1.4	2865.5
703	Windber borough	Somerset	4,088	2.0	2068.8
704	Charleroi borough	Washington	4,087	0.9	4741.3
705	Fleetwood borough	Berks	4,086	1.0	3947.8
705	Clarion Township	Clarion	4,086	31.5	129.6
707	North Beaver Township	Lawrence	4,078	43.0	94.7
708	Brown Township	Mifflin	4,076	32.9	123.8
709	West Pikeland Township	Chester	4,061	10.0	407.7
710	Jenner Township	Somerset	4,055	65.1	62.3
711	Centre Township	Berks	4,053	21.5	188.1
712	Chalfont borough	Bucks	4,052	1.6	2476.8
713	East Franklin Township	Armstrong	4,050	31.6	128.4
714	Boyertown borough	Berks	4,049	0.8	5204.4
715	Canaan Township	Wayne	4,048	19.2	210.9
716	Franklin Township	Beaver	4,044	17.9	226.5
717	Edgmont Township	Delaware	4,030	9.7	414.2
718	Dallastown borough	York	4,026	0.8	5181.5
718	Caernarvon Township	Berks	4,026	8.9	452.0
720	Greencastle borough	Franklin	4,019	1.6	2530.9
721	Ridgway borough†	Elk	4,006	2.7	1501.5
722	Sinking Spring borough	Berks	4,004	1.3	3177.8
723	Rush Township	Centre	3,995	148.3	26.9
724	Tinicum Township	Bucks	3,985	31.0	128.4
725	Kittanning borough†	Armstrong	3,980	1.3	3184.0
726	Monroe Township	Snyder	3,959	15.7	251.6
727	Millcreek Township	Lebanon	3,949	20.4	193.2
728	Waterford Township	Erie	3,947	50.3	78.5
729	Lawrence Park Township	Erie	3,945	1.8	2148.7
730	Irwin borough	Westmoreland	3,933	0.8	4698.9
731	Woodward Township	Clearfield	3,932	22.7	173.0
732	Elizabeth Township	Lancaster	3,926	17.7	222.1
733	Akron borough	Lancaster	3,909	1.2	3183.2
734	Greene Township	Pike	3,908	62.0	63.0
735	Laureldale borough	Berks	3,907	0.8	4914.5
736	Washington Township	Berks	3,905	14.1	276.3
737	Brookville borough†	Jefferson	3,891	3.2	1207.6
737	Carroll Valley borough	Adams	3,891	5.5	712.0
739	Lansford borough	Carbon	3,890	1.5	2530.9
740	West Pottsgrove Township	Montgomery	3,887	2.4	1651.9
741	Shenango Township	Mercer	3,880	30.3	128.1
742	Denver borough	Lancaster	3,866	1.3	2980.7
743	Codorus Township	York	3,863	33.5	115.5
744	Pennsburg borough	Montgomery	3,861	0.8	4820.2
745	Armagh Township	Mifflin	3,856	93.2	41.4
746	Washington Township	Fayette	3,853	9.9	389.9
747	Paradise Township	York	3,830	20.2	189.1
748	East Drumore Township	Lancaster	3,829	23.2	164.9
749	Shrewsbury borough	York	3,822	1.8	2109.3
750	Sewickley borough	Allegheny	3,821	1.1	3363.6
751	Lower Milford Township	Lehigh	3,819	19.7	193.7
752	Conestoga Township	Lancaster	3,804	16.6	229.5
753	Rockland Township	Berks	3,797	17.0	223.1
754	Green Township	Indiana	3,792	52.7	71.9
755	Port Vue borough	Allegheny	3,790	1.2	3225.5
756	Northumberland borough	Northumberland	3,784	1.5	2509.3
757	Zelienople borough	Butler	3,781	2.1	1804.8
758	Hempfield Township	Mercer	3,770	14.2	265.9
759	Frackville borough	Schuylkill	3,768	0.6	6332.8
760	Jefferson Township	Lackawanna	3,766	33.9	111.0
761	Northern Cambria borough	Cambria	3,763	3.0	1261.1
762	Clinton Township	Lycoming	3,758	28.3	132.6
762	Paupack Township	Wayne	3,758	33.1	113.4
764	Alsace Township	Berks	3,757	12.2	308.5
764	Amwell Township	Washington	3,757	44.8	83.9
766	North Manheim Township	Schuylkill	3,747	20.4	183.5
767	Greenwich Township	Berks	3,736	31.1	120.1
768	Millvale borough	Allegheny	3,735	0.7	5508.8
768	Point Township	Northumberland	3,735	27.5	135.9
770	Chadds Ford Township	Delaware	3,724	8.7	427.0
771	Sadsbury Township	Chester	3,714	6.2	599.4
772	Colerain Township	Lancaster	3,698	29.0	127.4
773	Kane borough	McKean	3,691	1.6	2352.5
774	Hanover Township	Beaver	3,680	45.0	81.7
775	Mount Joy Township	Adams	3,674	26.2	140.1
776	Slippery Rock borough	Butler	3,670	1.6	2231.0
777	Oley Township	Berks	3,661	24.1	152.0
778	Jenks Township	Forest	3,658	84.6	43.2
779	Jackson Township	Butler	3,646	21.7	167.8
780	Parkesburg borough	Chester	3,628	1.3	2847.7
780	Mansfield borough	Tioga	3,628	1.9	1893.5
782	Rochester borough	Beaver	3,624	0.7	4971.2
783	Pennsbury Township	Chester	3,622	10.1	360.2
784	Damascus Township	Wayne	3,609	80.3	45.0
785	Tilden Township	Berks	3,602	19.2	187.5
786	Fox Township	Elk	3,597	67.2	53.5
787	Portage Township	Cambria	3,589	24.9	144.4
788	Wallace Township	Chester	3,583	12.1	295.5
789	Pen Argyl borough	Northampton	3,576	1.4	2565.3
790	Halifax Township	Dauphin	3,562	31.8	112.1
791	Price Township	Monroe	3,559	25.2	141.3
792	Wharton Township	Fayette	3,556	91.8	38.7
793	Trappe borough	Montgomery	3,546	2.1	1720.5
794	Potter Township	Centre	3,544	59.0	60.1
795	Upper Frederick Township	Montgomery	3,542	10.1	350.9
796	Buffalo Township	Union	3,533	30.3	116.5
797	Mount Pleasant Township	Washington	3,530	35.7	99.0
798	Winfield Township	Butler	3,528	24.1	146.6
799	Mifflinburg borough	Union	3,523	1.8	1952.9
799	Muncy Creek Township	Lycoming	3,523	20.6	170.9
801	Ohioville borough	Beaver	3,519	23.7	148.5
802	Conewango Township	Warren	3,518	30.4	115.7
803	Union Township	Berks	3,515	23.8	147.7
803	Menallen Township	Adams	3,515	42.8	82.1
805	Freeland borough	Luzerne	3,514	0.7	5221.4
805	Lehman Township	Luzerne	3,514	23.2	151.4
807	West Salem Township	Mercer	3,510	36.9	95.1
808	Fayette Township	Juniata	3,507	40.0	87.6
809	Hegins Township	Schuylkill	3,504	31.9	109.8
810	Rice Township	Luzerne	3,484	11.2	311.8
811	Foster Township	Luzerne	3,479	45.2	77.0
812	Lower Chichester Township	Delaware	3,470	1.1	3233.9
813	Union Township	Mifflin	3,468	25.5	136.0
814	Freedom Township	Blair	3,463	17.4	199.2
815	Heidelberg Township	Lehigh	3,458	24.7	139.8
816	Charleston Township	Tioga	3,454	52.5	65.8
817	Nockamixon Township	Bucks	3,443	22.4	153.9
818	Etna borough	Allegheny	3,442	0.8	4329.6
818	Saltlick Township	Fayette	3,442	37.6	91.5
820	Sharpsburg borough	Allegheny	3,440	0.6	5383.4
821	Sadsbury Township	Lancaster	3,427	19.7	174.3
822	Masontown borough	Fayette	3,426	1.5	2220.3
823	Richmond Township	Berks	3,414	23.6	144.8
824	Springfield Township	Erie	3,413	37.7	90.6
825	Blairsville borough	Indiana	3,410	1.4	2409.9
826	Manheim Township	York	3,408	22.5	151.4
827	Springdale borough	Allegheny	3,403	1.1	3110.6
828	Mount Oliver borough	Allegheny	3,394	0.3	9982.4
829	Rush Township	Schuylkill	3,391	24.2	140.1
830	Pulaski Township	Lawrence	3,388	30.9	109.6
831	Pittston Township	Luzerne	3,384	13.8	245.4
832	Forward Township	Allegheny	3,375	19.8	170.3
833	Snyder Township	Blair	3,373	45.1	74.7
834	Athens borough	Bradford	3,358	1.8	1840.0
835	Conoy Township	Lancaster	3,343	18.4	181.2
836	Spring City borough	Chester	3,332	0.8	4058.5
837	Reserve Township	Allegheny	3,331	2.1	1616.2
837	Douglass Township	Berks	3,331	12.7	263.3
839	Upper Salford Township	Montgomery	3,329	9.1	366.7
840	West Brunswick Township	Schuylkill	3,325	30.6	108.7
841	Ingram borough	Allegheny	3,322	0.4	7654.4
842	Nesquehoning borough	Carbon	3,317	21.6	153.9
843	Wheatfield Township	Perry	3,312	21.0	157.9
844	Wesleyville borough	Erie	3,307	0.5	6239.6
845	Hatfield borough	Montgomery	3,302	0.6	5143.3
846	Palmyra Township	Pike	3,300	39.5	83.4
847	Ebensburg borough†	Cambria	3,295	1.7	1950.9
847	South Franklin Township	Washington	3,295	20.7	159.4
849	Wellsboro borough†	Tioga	3,291	4.9	669.9
850	Pitcairn borough	Allegheny	3,286	0.5	6506.9
851	Union City borough	Erie	3,285	1.9	1770.9
852	Tulpehocken Township	Berks	3,276	23.5	139.1
853	Manor borough	Westmoreland	3,272	1.9	1710.4
854	Marlborough Township	Montgomery	3,263	12.4	263.7
855	Pine Creek Township	Clinton	3,261	14.9	218.7
856	Brackenridge borough	Allegheny	3,252	0.6	5848.9
857	Pymatuning Township	Mercer	3,248	17.7	183.3
858	Lower Towamensing Township	Carbon	3,246	21.3	152.4
859	Upland borough	Delaware	3,244	0.6	4998.5
860	Centerville borough	Washington	3,242	13.6	238.2
861	Slippery Rock Township	Lawrence	3,241	30.1	107.8
862	North Wales borough	Montgomery	3,237	0.6	5514.5
863	Mahanoy Township	Schuylkill	3,222	21.3	151.5
864	Coplay borough	Lehigh	3,219	0.6	5134.0
865	Earl Township	Berks	3,208	13.8	232.1
866	Trafford borough (comb.)	Westmoreland, Allegheny	3,202	1.4	2234.5
867	London Britain Township	Chester	3,197	9.8	326.7
867	Penn Township	Perry	3,197	21.5	148.8
869	Mount Penn borough	Berks	3,177	0.4	7388.4
870	Daugherty Township	Beaver	3,176	9.9	320.1
871	West Providence Township	Bedford	3,174	38.7	81.9
872	Bart Township	Lancaster	3,170	16.5	192.7
873	Harmony Township	Beaver	3,167	3.1	1031.9
874	Homestead borough	Allegheny	3,155	0.6	4899.1
874	Union Township	Adams	3,155	17.6	179.5
876	Paradise Township	Monroe	3,154	21.4	147.5
877	Paint Township	Somerset	3,152	32.4	97.3
878	New Britain borough	Bucks	3,148	1.2	2601.7
879	Decatur Township	Mifflin	3,135	45.2	69.4
880	Mount Pocono borough	Monroe	3,131	3.5	905.7
881	Mount Carmel Township	Northumberland	3,126	21.5	145.2
882	Union Township	Lebanon	3,114	29.7	105.0
883	Fulton Township	Lancaster	3,112	29.2	106.5
884	Fawn Township	York	3,111	27.1	114.8
885	Edgewood borough	Allegheny	3,110	0.6	5298.1
886	Macungie borough	Lehigh	3,104	1.0	3135.4
887	Myerstown borough	Lebanon	3,100	0.9	3621.5
888	Lower Mount Bethel Township	Northampton	3,098	24.6	126.0
889	Thornbury Township	Chester	3,089	3.9	799.4
890	Girard borough	Erie	3,077	2.4	1302.2
891	Heidelberg Township	York	3,066	14.6	210.7
892	Orwigsburg borough	Schuylkill	3,064	2.2	1412.0
893	Wormleysburg borough	Cumberland	3,063	0.8	3800.2
894	Wrightstown Township	Bucks	3,060	9.8	312.9
895	Wyoming borough	Luzerne	3,059	1.6	1931.2
896	Lower Chanceford Township	York	3,057	41.7	73.3
897	Raccoon Township	Beaver	3,053	19.4	157.1
898	Nottingham Township	Washington	3,049	20.3	150.3
899	Mohnton borough	Berks	3,046	0.8	3961.0
900	McSherrystown borough	Adams	3,037	0.5	5931.6
901	Malvern borough	Chester	3,031	1.3	2394.2
902	Mahoning Township	Lawrence	3,029	24.7	122.6
903	Bradford Township	Clearfield	3,028	38.9	77.9
904	Wolf Township	Lycoming	3,025	19.8	153.0
905	Lake City borough	Erie	3,023	1.8	1673.9
906	Briar Creek Township	Columbia	3,019	21.2	142.6
907	Springfield Township	Fayette	3,017	59.6	50.6
908	Youngwood borough	Westmoreland	3,013	1.9	1567.6
909	Washington Township	Schuylkill	3,010	31.1	96.9
910	Summit Hill borough	Carbon	3,009	9.1	330.5
911	Churchill borough	Allegheny	3,008	2.2	1375.4
911	Conewago Township	Dauphin	3,008	16.7	179.8
911	Keating Township	McKean	3,008	98.2	30.6
914	Patterson Township	Beaver	3,006	1.6	1830.7
914	East St. Clair Township	Bedford	3,006	34.0	88.3
916	North Buffalo Township	Armstrong	2,998	25.1	119.3
916	West Buffalo Township	Union	2,998	38.3	78.2
918	Hereford Township	Berks	2,992	15.4	194.1
919	Penbrook borough	Dauphin	2,990	0.4	6689.0
920	Harmar Township	Allegheny	2,985	6.3	471.5
921	Armstrong Township	Indiana	2,983	37.7	79.0
921	Boggs Township	Centre	2,983	51.6	57.8
923	Oakland Township	Butler	2,970	24.0	123.7
924	Rayne Township	Indiana	2,968	47.3	62.8
925	St. Clair borough	Schuylkill	2,964	1.2	2403.9
926	East Greenville borough	Montgomery	2,963	0.5	5580.0
927	Wilkes-Barre Township	Luzerne	2,961	2.9	1033.9
928	Ford City borough	Armstrong	2,950	0.8	3876.5
929	Ross Township	Luzerne	2,946	43.9	67.1
930	Penn Township	Cumberland	2,939	29.6	99.2
931	Morris Township	Clearfield	2,923	19.9	147.1
932	Findley Township	Mercer	2,910	21.3	136.9
933	Hayfield Township	Crawford	2,908	38.9	74.8
934	Seven Fields borough	Butler	2,906	0.8	3609.9
934	Sadsbury Township	Crawford	2,906	25.1	115.9
936	Towanda borough†	Bradford	2,904	1.2	2486.3
937	Kulpmont borough	Northumberland	2,903	1.0	3024.0
938	Delmar Township	Tioga	2,898	80.9	35.8
939	Eldred Township	Monroe	2,897	24.5	118.2
940	South Annville Township	Lebanon	2,890	19.5	148.4
941	Springhill Township	Fayette	2,884	34.3	84.1
942	Cowanshannock Township	Armstrong	2,883	46.4	62.2
943	Kenhorst borough	Berks	2,872	0.6	4892.7
944	Clinton Township	Butler	2,867	23.6	121.7
945	West Grove borough	Chester	2,864	0.7	4399.4
946	East Penn Township	Carbon	2,863	22.8	125.3
947	Newton Township	Lackawanna	2,861	22.5	127.2
948	Fermanagh Township	Juniata	2,856	32.5	87.9
949	Luzerne borough	Luzerne	2,851	0.7	4137.9
950	Allegheny Township	Cambria	2,847	29.4	96.8
951	West Mahanoy Township	Schuylkill	2,845	10.4	272.9
952	North Catasauqua borough	Northampton	2,841	0.7	3844.4
953	Strasburg borough	Lancaster	2,839	1.0	2954.2
954	East Hanover Township	Lebanon	2,835	32.6	86.9
955	Mountville borough	Lancaster	2,829	0.9	3281.9
956	Woodcock Township	Crawford	2,824	32.9	85.8
957	Womelsdorf borough	Berks	2,817	0.9	3119.6
958	Fairfield Township	Lycoming	2,812	12.4	227.6
959	Dallas borough	Luzerne	2,807	2.4	1162.8
960	Harveys Lake borough	Luzerne	2,798	6.2	453.0
961	Aspinwall borough	Allegheny	2,797	0.4	7283.9
961	North Hopewell Township	York	2,797	18.7	149.6
963	Stonycreek Township	Cambria	2,793	3.6	779.7
964	Bedford borough†	Bedford	2,792	1.1	2508.5
965	Bridgewater Township	Susquehanna	2,791	41.4	67.4
966	Ashland borough	Schuylkill, Columbia	2,787	1.7	1680.9
967	Rochester Township	Beaver	2,785	4.0	704.9
967	Spring Brook Township	Lackawanna	2,785	34.9	79.8
969	Hepburn Township	Lycoming	2,784	16.8	166.1
970	Bear Creek Township	Luzerne	2,781	68.0	40.9
971	Ashley borough	Luzerne	2,779	0.9	3007.6
972	Walker Township	Juniata	2,773	29.4	94.5
973	Manchester borough	York	2,764	0.8	3521.0
974	Madison Township	Lackawanna	2,756	17.1	161.6
975	Philipsburg borough	Centre	2,754	0.9	3133.1
976	Cherryhill Township	Indiana	2,738	49.5	55.3
977	Reynoldsville borough	Jefferson	2,730	1.5	1828.5
978	Shade Township	Somerset	2,729	68.8	39.7
979	Wind Gap borough	Northampton	2,723	1.4	1993.4
980	West Nottingham Township	Chester	2,722	14.0	194.7
981	West Wyoming borough	Luzerne	2,717	3.6	750.8
982	Dupont borough	Luzerne	2,716	1.5	1789.2
983	Parks Township	Armstrong	2,715	14.2	191.2
984	South Beaver Township	Beaver	2,707	29.8	90.9
985	Germany Township	Adams	2,705	10.9	247.8
986	Clay Township	Butler	2,704	25.1	107.7
987	North Woodbury Township	Blair	2,699	21.1	128.1
988	Cooper Township	Clearfield	2,694	41.2	65.3
989	Halfmoon Township	Centre	2,692	23.6	114.1
990	Somerset Township	Washington	2,688	64.6	41.6
991	Wilmington Township	Lawrence	2,686	19.9	134.9
992	Bath borough	Northampton	2,684	0.9	2943.0
992	Nanty Glo borough	Cambria	2,684	1.9	1448.5
994	Franklin Township	Butler	2,681	22.9	117.2
995	Morton borough	Delaware	2,677	0.4	7477.7
996	East Taylor Township	Cambria	2,676	9.1	293.5
997	Washington Township	York	2,672	28.1	95.2
998	Hanover Township	Washington	2,667	47.6	56.0
999	Avoca borough	Luzerne	2,664	1.0	2581.4
1000	East Lansdowne borough	Delaware	2,663	0.2	12927.2
1001	Hallam borough	York	2,662	0.6	4192.1
1002	South Pymatuning Township	Mercer	2,661	21.6	123.0
1003	Delmont borough	Westmoreland	2,660	1.1	2518.9
1004	Pine Grove Township	Warren	2,657	39.9	66.6
1005	Derry borough	Westmoreland	2,654	0.8	3334.2
1005	Lackawannock Township	Mercer	2,654	20.9	127.1
1007	Lower Yoder Township	Cambria	2,652	13.1	202.0
1008	Clearfield Township	Butler	2,646	23.6	111.9
1009	Salford Township	Montgomery	2,644	9.8	268.8
1010	Monaghan Township	York	2,643	12.9	205.4
1011	Crescent Township	Allegheny	2,642	2.3	1144.7
1012	Quarryville borough	Lancaster	2,638	1.3	2012.2
1013	South Buffalo Township	Armstrong	2,635	27.8	94.9
1014	Freemansburg borough	Northampton	2,628	0.7	3532.3
1015	West Chillisquaque Township	Northumberland	2,625	14.0	187.9
1016	South Coventry Township	Chester	2,616	7.6	344.3
1017	Midland borough	Beaver	2,609	2.0	1310.4
1018	West Newton borough	Westmoreland	2,601	1.1	2318.2
1019	Winslow Township	Jefferson	2,598	45.3	57.3
1020	Marietta borough	Lancaster	2,589	0.8	3433.7
1020	Drumore Township	Lancaster	2,589	29.0	89.4
1022	Portage borough	Cambria	2,588	0.7	3933.1
1022	Upper Augusta Township	Northumberland	2,588	22.6	114.3
1024	Latimore Township	Adams	2,582	21.5	120.2
1025	West Fallowfield Township	Chester	2,580	18.3	141.3
1026	Wayne Township	Lawrence	2,578	16.3	157.8
1027	Roaring Spring borough	Blair	2,576	0.8	3200.0
1028	Dillsburg borough	York	2,569	0.8	3215.3
1029	Bentleyville borough	Washington	2,564	3.7	693.9
1029	Fannett Township	Franklin	2,564	68.2	37.6
1031	Butler Township	Adams	2,563	24.1	106.5
1032	Wayne Township	Mifflin	2,555	49.5	51.6
1033	Coudersport borough†	Potter	2,552	5.6	453.0
1034	Rockledge borough	Montgomery	2,550	0.3	7327.6
1035	Liberty borough	Allegheny	2,549	1.5	1715.3
1035	Morgan Township	Greene	2,549	24.7	103.1
1037	Colwyn borough	Delaware	2,544	0.3	9860.5
1037	Chester Heights borough	Delaware	2,544	2.2	1148.0
1039	Millersburg borough	Dauphin	2,543	0.8	3350.5
1040	Lamar Township	Clinton	2,540	41.0	61.9
1041	Hamilton Township	Adams	2,535	13.7	185.7
1042	Lancaster Township	Butler	2,534	23.0	110.1
1043	Perry Township	Fayette	2,532	20.7	122.4
1044	Snyder Township	Jefferson	2,526	41.5	60.9
1045	New Hope borough	Bucks	2,523	1.4	1778.0
1045	Shirley Township	Huntingdon	2,523	58.7	43.0
1047	Texas Township	Wayne	2,522	14.4	175.2
1048	Marysville borough	Perry	2,521	2.3	1077.8
1049	Forward Township	Butler	2,520	23.0	109.4
1050	Warwick Township	Chester	2,517	18.9	133.2
1051	South Manheim Township	Schuylkill	2,515	21.2	118.8
1052	Ryan Township	Schuylkill	2,511	18.0	139.7
1053	Curwensville borough	Clearfield	2,509	2.3	1075.4
1054	Franklin Township	Fayette	2,508	29.8	84.3
1055	Berlin Township	Wayne	2,502	39.6	63.2
1056	Weatherly borough	Carbon	2,501	3.0	839.5
1057	Upper Oxford Township	Chester	2,500	16.7	149.4
1058	Ridgway Township	Elk	2,495	87.8	28.4
1059	Independence Township	Beaver	2,491	23.4	106.4
1060	Wernersville borough	Berks	2,490	0.8	3259.2
1060	Saville Township	Perry	2,490	46.0	54.1
1062	Gilpin Township	Armstrong	2,485	17.1	145.0
1063	Taylor Township	Blair	2,484	23.3	106.4
1064	Centre Township	Perry	2,480	30.1	82.3
1065	Muncy borough	Lycoming	2,479	0.8	2937.2
1066	Verona borough	Allegheny	2,469	0.6	4142.6
1067	New Wilmington borough	Lawrence	2,467	1.1	2263.3
1068	West Sadsbury Township	Chester	2,466	10.7	231.5
1068	Donegal Township	Washington	2,466	41.7	59.2
1070	North Newton Township	Cumberland	2,455	22.8	107.4
1071	Yardley borough	Bucks	2,450	1.0	2402.0
1072	Hickory Township	Lawrence	2,449	15.9	153.7
1072	Hunlock Township	Luzerne	2,449	20.9	117.3
1074	Emsworth borough	Allegheny	2,447	0.7	3536.1
1075	Shamokin Township	Northumberland	2,446	31.1	78.6
1076	Johnsonburg borough	Elk	2,445	2.9	835.6
1077	Richmond Township	Tioga	2,443	50.7	48.2
1078	Center Township	Snyder	2,442	21.1	115.6
1079	Cambridge Springs borough	Crawford	2,433	0.9	2790.1
1080	Matamoras borough	Pike	2,432	0.8	3142.1
1080	Summerhill Township	Cambria	2,432	29.6	82.2
1082	Shohola Township	Pike	2,427	46.7	52.0
1082	Fairfield Township	Westmoreland	2,427	61.6	39.4
1084	Geistown borough	Cambria	2,423	1.1	2285.8
1084	Perry Township	Berks	2,423	18.2	133.3
1086	Mount Union borough	Huntingdon	2,419	1.2	1955.5
1087	East Hopewell Township	York	2,417	20.6	117.6
1088	North Annville Township	Lebanon	2,413	17.3	139.6
1089	Pleasant Township	Warren	2,412	34.5	69.8
1090	Eddystone borough	Delaware	2,410	1.5	1581.4
1091	Gregg Township	Centre	2,407	46.8	51.5
1092	Coopersburg borough	Lehigh	2,401	0.9	2567.9
1093	Marcus Hook borough	Delaware	2,395	1.6	1473.8
1094	Woodward Township	Clinton	2,394	18.2	131.5
1095	Donegal Township	Westmoreland	2,392	49.3	48.6
1096	Red Hill borough	Montgomery	2,390	0.7	3530.3
1096	Greene Township	Beaver	2,390	26.2	91.2
1098	Highspire borough	Dauphin	2,387	0.7	3221.3
1098	Clifford Township	Susquehanna	2,387	40.9	58.3
1100	Berwick Township	Adams	2,386	7.7	308.1
1100	Cornplanter Township	Venango	2,386	38.0	62.8
1102	Alburtis borough	Lehigh	2,383	0.7	3365.8
1103	Brothersvalley Township	Somerset	2,381	62.6	38.0
1104	Exeter Township	Luzerne	2,380	13.5	176.6
1105	Fawn Township	Allegheny	2,379	12.9	183.7
1106	Hamiltonban Township	Adams	2,369	39.3	60.3
1107	Huntington Township	Adams	2,367	25.1	94.2
1108	Connellsville Township	Fayette	2,366	11.5	205.8
1108	Hopewell Township	Cumberland	2,366	34.5	68.6
1110	Watsontown borough	Northumberland	2,363	0.9	2634.3
1111	Loyalhanna Township	Westmoreland	2,356	22.3	105.5
1112	Dunkard Township	Greene	2,355	31.9	73.9
1113	Plumcreek Township	Armstrong	2,352	43.0	54.6
1114	Rye Township	Perry	2,344	25.7	91.1
1115	East Wheatfield Township	Indiana	2,342	27.2	86.2
1116	Bell Township	Westmoreland	2,340	22.1	105.7
1117	East Bethlehem Township	Washington	2,336	5.3	439.1
1117	Scott Township	Lawrence	2,336	20.2	115.4
1119	Letterkenny Township	Franklin	2,331	70.5	33.1
1120	Parkside borough	Delaware	2,326	0.2	11291.3
1121	Covington Township	Lackawanna	2,320	23.9	97.0
1122	Jefferson Township	Greene	2,315	21.7	106.9
1123	Brownsville borough	Fayette	2,314	1.1	2121.0
1123	Pike Township	Clearfield	2,314	42.8	54.1
1125	Croyle Township	Cambria	2,313	18.4	126.0
1126	Stewartstown borough	York	2,311	0.8	2741.4
1127	Venango Township	Erie	2,309	43.8	52.7
1128	Upper Burrell Township	Westmoreland	2,308	15.1	152.5
1129	Windsor Township	Berks	2,303	23.2	99.4
1130	Mifflin Township	Columbia	2,301	19.9	115.8
1130	Westfall Township	Pike	2,301	29.5	78.1
1132	Wrightsville borough	York	2,297	0.7	3464.6
1133	Norwegian Township	Schuylkill	2,294	5.9	390.3
1134	Londonderry Township	Chester	2,292	11.4	201.8
1134	Tyrone Township	Adams	2,292	21.6	106.3
1136	West Wheatfield Township	Indiana	2,288	31.9	71.7
1137	Rockefeller Township	Northumberland	2,280	20.4	112.0
1138	Glade Township	Warren	2,275	36.8	61.8
1139	Delaware Township	Mercer	2,274	33.0	68.8
1140	Washington Township	Dauphin	2,273	17.7	128.3
1140	Lafayette Township	McKean	2,273	71.5	31.8
1142	Coolspring Township	Mercer	2,271	19.1	118.9
1143	Conemaugh Township	Indiana	2,268	34.5	65.7
1144	McAdoo borough	Schuylkill	2,267	0.3	6495.7
1145	Kittanning Township	Armstrong	2,264	30.8	73.5
1146	Summit Township	Somerset	2,256	45.3	49.8
1147	Penndel borough	Bucks	2,255	0.4	5394.7
1148	Franklin Township	Snyder	2,254	24.0	93.7
1149	Monroe Township	Juniata	2,250	19.9	113.1
1149	Huntington Township	Luzerne	2,250	28.7	78.3
1151	Muddy Creek Township	Butler	2,249	24.4	92.2
1152	Coaldale borough	Schuylkill	2,248	2.2	1033.6
1153	Hemlock Township	Columbia	2,247	17.6	127.3
1154	Cook Township	Westmoreland	2,245	46.8	48.0
1155	Sandycreek Township	Venango	2,244	19.1	117.5
1156	Newtown borough	Bucks	2,242	0.6	4061.6
1156	Southmont borough	Cambria	2,242	1.1	2135.2
1158	Haycock Township	Bucks	2,227	21.0	105.9
1159	East Washington borough	Washington	2,221	0.4	4946.5
1160	Elk Lick Township	Somerset	2,218	57.7	38.5
1161	Dorrance Township	Luzerne	2,212	24.4	90.8
1162	Stonycreek Township	Somerset	2,211	61.6	35.9
1163	Woodward Township	Lycoming	2,206	13.5	162.9
1163	Lowhill Township	Lehigh	2,206	14.1	156.2
1163	Spring Township	Perry	2,206	28.8	76.6
1166	Perry Township	Snyder	2,194	26.4	83.1
1167	Oliver Township	Mifflin	2,192	35.5	61.8
1168	West Nantmeal Township	Chester	2,187	13.5	161.5
1169	Wilmerding borough	Allegheny	2,185	0.4	5105.1
1170	Fell Township	Lackawanna	2,171	15.3	141.5
1170	Napier Township	Bedford	2,171	58.6	37.0
1172	New Eagle borough	Washington	2,169	1.1	1931.4
1173	Conway borough	Beaver	2,167	1.5	1485.3
1173	Shippen Township	Cameron	2,167	157.0	13.8
1175	Pine Grove borough	Schuylkill	2,166	1.1	2033.8
1175	Valley Township	Montour	2,166	16.2	133.5
1177	Jermyn borough	Lackawanna	2,165	0.8	2733.6
1177	New Stanton borough	Westmoreland	2,165	4.0	537.2
1179	Lurgan Township	Franklin	2,164	32.8	65.9
1180	Spring Grove borough	York	2,159	0.8	2785.8
1181	Dublin borough	Bucks	2,156	0.6	3698.1
1182	Porter Township	Schuylkill	2,155	18.0	119.8
1183	Braddock borough	Allegheny	2,153	0.6	3332.8
1184	Eldred Township	Lycoming	2,151	14.3	150.0
1185	Meyersdale borough	Somerset	2,146	0.8	2626.7
1186	Hughesville borough	Lycoming	2,145	0.6	3325.6
1186	Canton Township	Bradford	2,145	37.3	57.5
1188	South Woodbury Township	Bedford	2,137	33.8	63.3
1189	McDonald borough (comb.)	Washington, Allegheny	2,135	0.5	4090.0
1189	Port Allegany borough	McKean	2,135	1.8	1166.0
1191	East McKeesport borough	Allegheny	2,132	0.4	5162.2
1192	Eden Township	Lancaster	2,131	12.6	169.6
1193	Middlecreek Township	Snyder	2,127	14.5	146.6
1194	Southwest Greensburg borough	Westmoreland	2,126	0.4	5423.5
1195	Liberty Township	Centre	2,121	24.7	85.9
1196	Rankin borough	Allegheny	2,119	0.5	4212.7
1197	Leechburg borough	Armstrong	2,118	0.5	4412.5
1198	Milford Township	Juniata	2,114	40.5	52.2
1199	Tyrone Township	Perry	2,111	35.9	58.8
1200	Cleona borough	Lebanon	2,110	0.8	2514.9
1201	North Centre Township	Columbia	2,102	15.0	140.1
1202	Greenfield Township	Lackawanna	2,101	21.5	97.5
1203	South Greensburg borough	Westmoreland	2,094	0.7	2961.8
1204	Sheffield Township	Warren	2,085	59.2	35.2
1205	Bald Eagle Township	Clinton	2,083	42.1	49.5
1206	Buffalo Township	Washington	2,078	20.4	102.0
1207	Fairview Township	Butler	2,076	24.2	85.7
1208	Berlin borough	Somerset	2,074	0.9	2264.2
1209	Robesonia borough	Berks	2,070	0.9	2315.4
1210	Topton borough	Berks	2,069	0.7	2985.6
1211	Walnutport borough	Northampton	2,065	0.8	2578.0
1212	Lake Township	Luzerne	2,063	26.7	77.3
1213	Brockway borough	Jefferson	2,054	1.2	1746.6
1214	Barr Township	Cambria	2,051	31.4	65.3
1214	Henry Clay Township	Fayette	2,051	53.1	38.7
1216	Black Creek Township	Luzerne	2,049	24.5	83.7
1217	Burnham borough	Mifflin	2,048	1.1	1921.2
1218	Union Township	Luzerne	2,046	20.1	102.0
1219	Upper Tyrone Township	Fayette	2,039	7.8	260.7
1219	Jay Township	Elk	2,039	67.9	30.0
1221	Limestone Township	Lycoming	2,038	33.7	60.4
1222	Bell Township	Jefferson	2,032	18.8	108.3
1223	Mount Holly Springs borough	Cumberland	2,030	1.5	1398.1
1224	South Shenango Township	Crawford	2,029	29.9	67.8
1225	Moscow borough	Lackawanna	2,023	2.9	709.3
1225	Clinton Township	Wayne	2,023	39.6	51.1
1227	Upper Frankford Township	Cumberland	2,021	19.6	103.0
1228	Glen Rock borough	York	2,020	0.8	2521.8
1229	Emporium borough†	Cameron	2,013	0.8	2680.4
1230	New Milford Township	Susquehanna	2,008	45.4	44.2
1231	Columbus Township	Warren	2,006	40.7	49.3
1232	Summit Township	Crawford	2,002	26.0	76.9
1232	Pine Township	Indiana	2,002	31.1	64.5
1234	Jefferson Township	Fayette	2,000	20.3	98.3
1235	Ridgebury Township	Bradford	1,999	38.5	51.9
1236	Dover borough	York	1,998	0.5	3679.6
1236	Quemahoning Township	Somerset	1,998	35.7	55.9
1238	Hopewell Township	Bedford	1,992	17.0	117.2
1239	Canton borough	Bradford	1,991	1.2	1725.3
1239	Jefferson Township	Berks	1,991	16.0	124.3
1241	Miles Township	Centre	1,990	62.6	31.8
1242	Penn Township	Berks	1,987	19.0	104.7
1242	Brady Township	Clearfield	1,987	37.4	53.2
1244	Baldwin Township	Allegheny	1,986	0.5	3924.9
1244	Blacklick Township	Cambria	1,986	31.2	63.7
1246	Conemaugh Township	Cambria	1,977	11.4	173.8
1247	Springfield Township	Mercer	1,976	27.5	71.8
1247	Susquehanna Township	Cambria	1,976	28.0	70.5
1249	Mercer borough†	Mercer	1,975	1.1	1730.9
1250	West Cornwall Township	Lebanon	1,967	8.6	227.5
1251	Porter Township	Huntingdon	1,966	35.5	55.4
1252	Darlington Township	Beaver	1,965	22.0	89.1
1253	Falls Township	Wyoming	1,964	21.1	92.9
1254	Fairchance borough	Fayette	1,960	1.2	1630.6
1255	Big Beaver borough	Beaver	1,959	18.0	108.7
1256	South Connellsville borough	Fayette	1,956	1.7	1131.9
1257	Greenfield Township	Erie	1,954	34.2	57.2
1258	Roaring Brook Township	Lackawanna	1,952	21.9	89.3
1259	Jackson Township	Dauphin	1,951	40.1	48.7
1260	Walker Township	Huntingdon	1,950	18.5	105.3
1261	Martinsburg borough	Blair	1,948	0.6	3082.3
1262	North Belle Vernon borough	Westmoreland	1,944	0.4	4595.7
1262	Kidder Township	Carbon	1,944	69.8	27.9
1264	Cass Township	Schuylkill	1,940	14.4	134.4
1265	West Homestead borough	Allegheny	1,937	1.0	1912.1
1266	Greenwood Township	Columbia	1,933	28.4	68.0
1267	Riverside borough	Northumberland	1,932	5.3	361.7
1268	Jonestown borough	Lebanon	1,931	0.6	3045.7
1269	Perry Township	Lawrence	1,930	18.6	103.9
1269	Robinson Township	Washington	1,930	21.2	91.1
1271	Ayr Township	Fulton	1,927	46.6	41.4
1272	Oliver Township	Perry	1,926	8.5	225.7
1272	Lewis Township	Northumberland	1,926	26.4	72.9
1274	South Centre Township	Columbia	1,925	6.0	323.1
1275	Great Bend Township	Susquehanna	1,920	36.8	52.1
1275	Jackson Township	Tioga	1,920	40.9	47.0
1277	Leesport borough	Berks	1,919	0.7	2625.2
1277	Farmington Township	Clarion	1,919	62.5	30.7
1279	Auburn Township	Susquehanna	1,918	50.3	38.1
1279	Upper Tulpehocken Township	Berks	1918	23.3	82.3
1281	Aleppo Township	Allegheny	1,917	1.8	1081.8
1282	Tyrone Township	Blair	1,915	41.9	45.7
1283	North York borough	York	1,912	0.3	6128.2
1284	Lenox Township	Susquehanna	1,910	41.1	46.4
1285	Benton Township	Lackawanna	1,909	25.0	76.5
1286	Conyngham borough	Luzerne	1,908	1.0	1868.8
1287	Washington Township	Jefferson	1,907	48.0	39.8
1288	Menno Township	Mifflin	1,905	23.7	80.4
1289	Bloomfield Township	Crawford	1,894	38.2	49.5
1290	Rayburn Township	Armstrong	1,882	12.1	155.6
1291	Braddock Hills borough	Allegheny	1,877	1.0	1963.4
1292	Washington Township	Clarion	1,875	33.0	56.8
1293	Cherry Ridge Township	Wayne	1,874	22.3	84.2
1294	Donegal Township	Butler	1,873	23.2	80.7
1295	Forest City borough	Susquehanna	1,871	0.9	1982.0
1296	Tullytown borough	Bucks	1,869	2.1	886.6
1296	Metal Township	Franklin	1,869	44.6	41.9
1298	Jefferson Township	Mercer	1,866	25.4	73.4
1299	Port Carbon borough	Schuylkill	1,863	0.8	2470.8
1300	Zerbe Township	Northumberland	1,860	11.6	160.3
1301	Brokenstraw Township	Warren	1,854	38.2	48.5
1302	East Providence Township	Bedford	1,853	50.8	36.5
1303	Limestone Township	Clarion	1,850	37.9	48.7
1304	Oil Creek Township	Crawford	1,845	32.2	57.3
1305	Brush Valley Township	Indiana	1,842	42.5	43.3
1306	Trainer borough	Delaware	1,841	1.4	1339.9
1307	Londonderry Township	Bedford	1,840	55.0	33.5
1308	West Franklin Township	Armstrong	1,836	26.1	70.4
1309	Upper Fairfield Township	Lycoming	1,835	18.1	101.3
1310	Jacobus borough	York	1,831	0.9	1947.9
1310	Elkland borough	Tioga	1,831	2.4	748.9
1312	East Nantmeal Township	Chester	1,830	16.4	111.7
1313	Lehigh Township	Wayne	1,828	12.6	144.9
1314	Branch Township	Schuylkill	1,823	11.5	157.9
1314	Rome Township	Crawford	1,823	41.3	44.1
1316	Industry borough	Beaver	1,820	11.0	165.8
1317	East Pittsburgh borough	Allegheny	1,819	0.4	4688.1
1318	Hartley Township	Union	1,818	80.2	22.7
1319	South Mahoning Township	Indiana	1,816	28.6	63.5
1320	Evans City borough	Butler	1,814	0.8	2217.6
1321	Plymouth Township	Luzerne	1,813	16.4	110.4
1322	Bellwood borough	Blair	1,812	0.4	4283.7
1322	Turbot Township	Northumberland	1,812	14.1	128.7
1324	St. Lawrence borough	Berks	1,810	0.9	2054.5
1324	Elk Creek Township	Erie	1,810	34.8	52.0
1326	Sparta Township	Crawford	1,809	42.0	43.1
1327	Tunkhannock borough†	Wyoming	1,806	1.0	1875.4
1328	Warriors Mark Township	Huntingdon	1,805	29.4	61.5
1329	Bonneauville borough	Adams	1,804	1.0	1867.5
1330	Mayfield borough	Lackawanna	1,798	2.4	735.1
1330	Henderson Township	Jefferson	1,798	22.0	81.7
1332	Everett borough	Bedford	1,797	1.1	1696.9
1333	Freeport borough	Armstrong	1,791	1.3	1378.8
1334	Nicholson Township	Fayette	1,790	22.0	81.5
1335	Adamstown borough	Lancaster, Berks	1,789	1.4	1322.3
1336	Washington Township	Indiana	1,788	38.3	46.7
1337	Dravosburg borough	Allegheny	1,785	1.1	1679.2
1338	New Oxford borough	Adams	1,783	0.6	2880.5
1339	East Brunswick Township	Schuylkill	1,778	30.6	58.1
1340	Ben Avon borough	Allegheny	1,775	0.5	3875.5
1341	Lower Mifflin Township	Cumberland	1,774	23.9	74.2
1342	Lykens borough	Dauphin	1,773	1.2	1453.3
1343	Beccaria Township	Clearfield	1,772	36.0	49.2
1344	Perryopolis borough	Fayette	1,771	1.5	1156.0
1345	Snake Spring Township	Bedford	1,769	26.3	67.4
1346	Beaver Township	Clarion	1,767	33.7	52.4
1347	Franklin Township	Luzerne	1,766	31.5	56.1
1348	Boggs Township	Clearfield	1,765	36.5	48.3
1349	Randolph Township	Crawford	1,754	43.1	40.7
1350	Young Township	Indiana	1,753	34.8	50.3
1351	Waverly Township	Lackawanna	1,748	4.6	383.3
1351	Marion Township	Berks	1,748	15.1	115.5
1353	South Canaan Township	Wayne	1,746	28.2	61.8
1354	Snow Shoe Township	Centre	1,743	84.0	20.7
1355	Lawrence Township	Tioga	1,742	34.3	50.8
1356	Cheswick borough	Allegheny	1,741	0.5	3171.2
1356	Honey Brook borough	Chester	1,741	0.5	3627.1
1358	Upper Bern Township	Berks	1,739	17.7	98.1
1358	Limestone Township	Union	1,739	20.7	83.9
1360	Tremont borough	Schuylkill	1,736	0.7	2391.2
1360	Patton borough	Cambria	1,736	0.9	1972.7
1362	Pike Township	Berks	1,735	14.0	123.7
1363	Heidelberg Township	Berks	1,734	14.3	121.2
1363	Young Township	Jefferson	1,734	15.5	111.7
1365	Mont Alto borough	Franklin	1,731	0.6	3047.5
1365	Albany Township	Berks	1,731	39.8	43.5
1367	Lower Frankford Township	Cumberland	1,728	15.0	115.2
1368	Wysox Township	Bradford	1,719	23.3	73.7
1369	Ontelaunee Township	Berks	1,718	9.4	183.5
1370	West St. Clair Township	Bedford	1,717	29.9	57.5
1371	Cherry Township	Sullivan	1,707	58.2	29.4
1372	Greene Township	Clinton	1,703	47.0	36.2
1373	Lower Mahanoy Township	Northumberland	1,701	25.6	66.4
1374	Licking Creek Township	Fulton	1,700	44.7	38.1
1375	LeBoeuf Township	Erie	1,699	33.9	50.1
1376	Sugar Grove Township	Warren	1,698	35.4	48.0
1377	Youngsville borough	Warren	1,696	1.3	1275.2
1378	Silver Lake Township	Susquehanna	1,695	33.3	50.9
1379	Elk Township	Chester	1,694	10.1	167.3
1380	Woodbury Township	Blair	1,692	32.4	52.3
1381	Homer City borough	Indiana	1,687	0.6	3012.5
1382	Mars borough	Butler	1,686	0.5	3579.6
1383	Paint Township	Clarion	1,683	20.7	81.4
1384	Edgeworth borough	Allegheny	1,681	1.7	1003.0
1384	Shamokin Dam borough	Snyder	1,681	1.9	892.7
1384	Troy Township	Bradford	1,681	36.2	46.5
1387	Wayne Township	Clinton	1,680	22.9	73.5
1388	Cresson borough	Cambria	1,678	0.5	3474.1
1389	East Lackawannock Township	Mercer	1,670	21.4	78.0
1390	Broad Top Township	Bedford	1,661	48.5	34.3
1391	Washington Township	Snyder	1,660	24.2	68.6
1392	Wayne Township	Erie	1,655	38.1	43.4
1393	Overfield Township	Wyoming	1,653	10.3	161.1
1393	Union Township	Erie	1,653	36.6	45.1
1395	Washington Township	Lycoming	1,651	48.3	34.2
1396	Gallitzin borough	Cambria	1,645	0.7	2247.3
1396	Monroe Township	Wyoming	1,645	21.3	77.3
1398	Cressona borough	Schuylkill	1,642	1.0	1645.3
1399	Wetmore Township	McKean	1,639	78.1	21.0
1400	Lykens Township	Dauphin	1,637	26.5	61.8
1401	Smethport borough†	McKean	1,636	1.7	971.5
1401	East Carroll Township	Cambria	1,636	24.9	65.6
1403	Springdale Township	Allegheny	1,635	2.4	680.1
1404	Leet Township	Allegheny	1,632	1.5	1087.3
1405	Franklin Township	Erie	1,631	28.7	56.8
1406	North Bethlehem Township	Washington	1,624	22.1	73.5
1407	Apollo borough	Armstrong	1,623	0.3	4663.8
1408	Mill Hall borough	Clinton	1,619	0.9	1707.8
1409	Langhorne borough	Bucks	1,618	0.5	3275.3
1410	Spring Township	Snyder	1,616	37.4	43.2
1411	Porter Township	Lycoming	1,614	7.9	204.2
1412	East Union Township	Schuylkill	1,613	25.8	62.5
1413	Susquehanna Depot borough	Susquehanna	1,612	0.8	1963.5
1413	Mount Pleasant Township	Columbia	1,612	16.9	95.3
1415	Springville Township	Susquehanna	1,611	30.8	52.3
1416	Jones Township	Elk	1,609	147.1	10.9
1417	Madison Township	Columbia	1,607	35.3	45.6
1418	Kimmel Township	Bedford	1,604	20.2	79.5
1419	Ferndale borough	Cambria	1,602	0.4	3869.6
1420	Liberty Township	McKean	1,600	83.7	19.1
1421	Union Township	Union	1,596	11.3	140.9
1421	Liberty Township	Montour	1,596	27.4	58.1
1421	East Fallowfield Township	Crawford	1,596	28.1	56.8
1424	Reade Township	Cambria	1,593	38.7	41.2
1425	Clearfield Township	Cambria	1,592	31.0	51.4
1426	Eldred Township	McKean	1,589	39.2	40.5
1427	Cumberland Valley Township	Bedford	1,587	60.2	26.3
1428	Hanover Township	Lehigh	1,584	4.2	373.8
1429	Montgomery borough	Lycoming	1,582	0.6	2865.9
1429	Montrose borough†	Susquehanna	1,582	1.3	1241.8
1431	Haines Township	Centre	1,579	57.4	27.5
1432	West Pike Run Township	Washington	1,578	16.3	97.1
1433	Delaware Township	Juniata	1,577	29.6	53.3
1434	Nescopeck borough	Luzerne	1,573	1.0	1533.1
1435	Waterford borough	Erie	1,570	1.2	1265.1
1436	Shiremanstown borough	Cumberland	1,566	0.3	5272.7
1437	Roseto borough	Northampton	1,565	0.6	2524.2
1438	Newport borough	Perry	1,563	0.3	4610.6
1439	Cussewago Township	Crawford	1,558	40.9	38.1
1440	Freedom borough	Beaver	1,557	0.7	2112.6
1440	Mercersburg borough	Franklin	1,557	0.9	1726.2
1442	Ligonier borough	Westmoreland	1,553	0.5	3081.3
1443	Paxtang borough	Dauphin	1,552	0.4	3822.7
1444	Montgomery Township	Indiana	1,551	28.7	54.0
1445	Blossburg borough	Tioga	1,550	4.6	333.6
1445	Chapman Township	Snyder	1,550	13.6	114.1
1447	Cross Creek Township	Washington	1,549	27.6	56.1
1448	Monongahela Township	Greene	1,548	18.0	86.1
1449	Independence Township	Washington	1,547	25.8	60.0
1449	Otto Township	McKean	1,547	34.4	44.9
1451	Northmoreland Township	Wyoming	1,545	19.8	77.9
1452	Cambridge Township	Crawford	1,544	21.6	71.5
1452	Milford Township	Somerset	1,544	29.8	51.9
1454	Richland borough	Lebanon	1,541	1.4	1111.8
1455	Monroe Township	Clarion	1,538	29.9	51.5
1456	Catawissa borough	Columbia	1,533	0.5	2854.7
1457	Wayne Township	Crawford	1,531	35.5	43.1
1457	Spring Township	Crawford	1,531	45.7	33.5
1459	Sugarcreek Township	Armstrong	1,527	26.7	57.3
1459	Todd Township	Fulton	1,527	29.0	52.7
1461	Saxonburg borough	Butler	1,524	0.9	1682.1
1462	Cherrytree Township	Venango	1,522	36.7	41.5
1463	East Berlin borough	Adams	1,521	0.7	2095.0
1464	Union Township	Snyder	1,518	14.6	104.3
1465	Frenchcreek Township	Venango	1,517	29.3	51.7
1466	Avis borough	Clinton	1,512	0.5	3054.5
1466	Anthony Township	Montour	1,512	26.2	57.6
1466	Eaton Township	Wyoming	1,512	37.1	40.7
1469	Versailles borough	Allegheny	1,510	0.5	2811.9
1469	Lincoln Township	Somerset	1,510	25.7	58.7
1471	Bethel Township	Fulton	1,508	37.1	40.7
1472	St. Clair Township	Westmoreland	1,507	28.4	53.0
1473	Duncannon borough	Perry	1,505	0.4	3697.8
1473	Girardville borough	Schuylkill	1,505	0.5	2834.3
1473	Milford Township	Pike	1,506	13.2	114.4
1473	Lycoming Township	Lycoming	1,506	15.3	98.5
1473	Cromwell Township	Huntingdon	1,505	50.8	29.6
1478	Albion borough	Erie	1,503	1.1	1376.4
1479	Elizabethville borough	Dauphin	1,501	0.5	2749.1
1480	Concord Township	Butler	1,496	24.2	61.8
1481	East Deer Township	Allegheny	1,495	2.5	591.8
1481	Oakland Township	Venango	1,495	29.0	51.6
1483	Freehold Township	Warren	1,493	35.8	41.7
1483	Smithfield Township	Bradford	1,493	42.0	35.5
1485	Canoe Township	Indiana	1,489	27.1	54.9
1486	Elizabeth borough	Allegheny	1,488	0.4	3594.2
1487	Clifton Township	Lackawanna	1,487	19.8	75.0
1488	Laflin borough	Luzerne	1,486	1.4	1100.7
1489	Rockdale Township	Crawford	1,485	36.2	41.0
1490	Porter Township	Clinton	1,484	25.7	57.8
1491	Dimock Township	Susquehanna	1,483	29.5	50.3
1492	Pulaski Township	Beaver	1,482	0.7	2041.3
1493	New Beaver borough	Lawrence	1,480	14.6	101.6
1494	East Mead Township	Crawford	1,479	23.3	63.5
1495	Perry Township	Greene	1,478	30.2	48.9
1496	Windsor borough	York	1,477	0.5	2695.3
1496	Elk Township	Clarion	1,477	31.7	46.7
1498	Lewis Township	Union	1,475	38.9	37.9
1499	Clarks Green borough	Lackawanna	1,471	0.5	2754.7
1499	Sullivan Township	Tioga	1,471	42.4	34.7
1501	North Union Township	Schuylkill	1,464	39.0	37.5
1502	West Bethlehem Township	Washington	1,462	22.4	65.2
1503	Oakdale borough	Allegheny	1,457	0.5	3106.6
1504	Richmond Township	Crawford	1,456	36.8	39.6
1505	Conyngham Township	Luzerne	1,455	17.0	85.7
1506	Conneaut Township	Crawford	1,453	41.7	34.9
1507	Belfast Township	Fulton	1,449	50.1	28.9
1508	Horton Township	Elk	1,443	57.1	25.3
1509	Langhorne Manor borough	Bucks	1,440	0.6	2388.1
1510	Rockland Township	Venango	1,436	49.6	29.0
1511	Blawnox borough	Allegheny	1,433	0.4	3249.4
1511	Greenwood Township	Crawford	1,433	36.6	39.1
1513	Wilmington Township	Mercer	1,432	13.1	109.7
1513	Perry Township	Mercer	1,432	18.0	79.5
1515	Kline Township	Schuylkill	1,426	12.4	114.9
1515	Sterling Township	Wayne	1,426	27.2	52.4
1517	Worth Township	Butler	1,420	25.2	56.3
1518	Ransom Township	Lackawanna	1,417	18.0	78.6
1518	Harford Township	Susquehanna	1,417	33.3	42.6
1520	Huston Township	Clearfield	1,416	64.2	22.1
1521	North Mahoning Township	Indiana	1,415	28.3	50.0
1522	South Newton Township	Cumberland	1,412	11.4	124.0
1523	Atglen borough	Chester	1,411	0.9	1598.0
1524	Warsaw Township	Jefferson	1,410	51.5	27.4
1525	Fishing Creek Township	Columbia	1,409	28.7	49.0
1526	Mahoning Township	Armstrong	1,408	25.2	55.8
1527	Locust Township	Columbia	1,407	17.9	78.6
1527	Jefferson Township	Somerset	1,407	41.4	34.0
1529	Jackson Township	Snyder	1,405	14.8	94.7
1530	Juniata Township	Perry	1,403	21.1	66.5
1530	Union Township	Centre	1,403	46.7	30.0
1532	Bell Acres borough	Allegheny	1,400	5.4	260.9
1533	Liberty Township	Mercer	1,399	14.8	94.3
1534	Hughestown borough	Luzerne	1,396	0.9	1530.7
1534	Bryn Athyn borough	Montgomery	1,396	1.9	722.9
1536	Little Beaver Township	Lawrence	1,395	20.5	68.0
1537	Dyberry Township	Wayne	1,392	22.9	60.8
1538	Washington Township	Wyoming	1,391	19.4	71.7
1538	East Finley Township	Washington	1,391	35.1	39.6
1540	Avondale borough	Chester	1,390	0.5	2802.4
1540	North Shenango Township	Crawford	1,390	26.2	53.1
1542	Schwenksville borough	Montgomery	1,389	0.4	3307.1
1543	Mount Wolf borough	York	1,384	0.5	2641.2
1543	South Coatesville borough	Chester	1,384	1.8	784.6
1545	White Township	Beaver	1,383	0.7	1984.2
1546	Pittsfield Township	Warren	1,382	55.6	24.8
1547	Dreher Township	Wayne	1,380	15.1	91.4
1548	Williamstown borough	Dauphin	1,378	0.3	5320.5
1549	Shoemakersville borough	Berks	1,377	0.6	2374.1
1549	Burgettstown borough	Washington	1,377	0.6	2213.8
1551	Nicholson Township	Wyoming	1,370	23.1	59.3
1551	Graham Township	Clearfield	1,370	29.9	45.8
1553	East Bangor borough	Northampton	1,367	0.9	1477.8
1553	Loretto borough	Cambria	1,367	1.0	1428.4
1555	Irwin Township	Venango	1,366	30.5	44.7
1556	Mead Township	Warren	1,365	85.6	15.9
1557	Redbank Township	Clarion	1,364	30.3	45.1
1558	Huston Township	Centre	1,360	25.6	53.1
1559	District Township	Berks	1,356	11.5	117.5
1559	Huston Township	Blair	1,356	34.9	38.9
1561	Ulster Township	Bradford	1,345	19.5	68.9
1562	Clymer borough	Indiana	1,343	0.6	2284.0
1562	Wayne Township	Dauphin	1,343	13.9	96.6
1562	West Mahoning Township	Indiana	1,343	29.4	45.7
1565	Flemington borough	Clinton	1,341	0.5	2940.8
1565	Pine Creek Township	Jefferson	1,341	28.6	46.9
1565	Mount Pleasant Township	Wayne	1,341	57.6	23.3
1568	Liberty Township	Bedford	1,340	26.5	50.5
1569	Sheshequin Township	Bradford	1,339	36.1	37.1
1570	Concord Township	Erie	1,338	33.2	40.3
1570	Porter Township	Clarion	1,338	44.5	30.1
1572	Litchfield Township	Bradford	1,336	30.4	43.9
1573	Pinegrove Township	Venango	1,335	37.0	36.1
1574	Montour Township	Columbia	1,334	9.6	138.9
1575	Tower City borough	Schuylkill	1,332	0.3	4228.6
1576	West Conshohocken borough	Montgomery	1,330	0.9	1479.4
1577	Richlandtown borough	Bucks	1,326	0.3	5100.0
1577	Newville borough	Cumberland	1,326	0.4	3098.1
1577	Buffington Township	Indiana	1,326	30.7	43.2
1580	Terre Hill borough	Lancaster	1,325	0.5	2918.5
1581	Newlin Township	Chester	1,323	12.1	109.1
1582	Upper Mifflin Township	Cumberland	1,319	22.1	59.7
1582	Bratton Township	Mifflin	1,319	33.3	39.7
1584	Vanport Township	Beaver	1,317	1.2	1102.1
1585	Troy borough	Bradford	1,314	0.8	1708.7
1586	Palmyra Township	Wayne	1,311	16.3	80.2
1586	Monroe Township	Bedford	1,311	87.7	15.0
1588	Gallitzin Township	Cambria	1,308	17.1	76.5
1589	Clinton Township	Wyoming	1,306	12.4	105.4
1589	Middlebury Township	Tioga	1,306	49.4	26.5
1591	North Charleroi borough	Washington	1,304	0.3	4435.4
1592	Waymart borough	Wayne	1,302	2.8	471.9
1593	Brady Township	Butler	1,296	17.4	74.6
1593	Washington Township	Butler	1,296	25.0	51.9
1595	Middleburg borough†	Snyder	1,295	0.9	1409.1
1596	Dublin Township	Huntingdon	1,292	36.8	35.1
1597	Hallstead borough	Susquehanna	1,290	0.4	3078.8
1597	Houston borough	Washington	1,290	0.4	3138.7
1599	Main Township	Columbia	1,288	16.7	77.3
1600	Highland Township	Chester	1,284	17.2	74.7
1601	North Apollo borough	Armstrong	1,281	0.6	2142.1
1601	Bridgeton Township	Bucks	1,281	6.8	188.3
1603	Elverson borough	Chester	1,279	1.0	1272.6
1604	West Leechburg borough	Westmoreland	1,278	1.0	1281.8
1604	West Carroll Township	Cambria	1,278	10.7	119.2
1606	Bigler Township	Clearfield	1,277	24.6	52.0
1606	Fairmount Township	Luzerne	1,277	46.2	27.6
1608	Jackson Township	Mercer	1,276	17.7	72.1
1609	Whitaker borough	Allegheny	1,271	0.3	3863.2
1610	Union Township	Schuylkill	1,262	21.7	58.1
1611	Liberty Township	Susquehanna	1,261	29.9	42.2
1611	Rome Township	Bradford	1,261	30.1	41.9
1613	Boswell borough	Somerset	1,260	0.7	1705.0
1613	Susquehanna Township	Juniata	1,260	16.5	76.3
1615	Watts Township	Perry	1,259	12.2	103.4
1616	Hastings borough	Cambria	1,258	0.6	2266.7
1617	Woodbury Township	Bedford	1,257	23.4	53.6
1617	Wyalusing Township	Bradford	1,257	28.8	43.6
1619	Centre Hall borough	Centre	1,256	0.6	2019.3
1620	Monroe Township	Bradford	1,254	36.7	34.2
1621	Dublin Township	Fulton	1,251	36.9	33.9
1621	Rush Township	Susquehanna	1,251	38.6	32.4
1623	West Easton borough	Northampton	1,250	0.3	3720.2
1624	Orange Township	Columbia	1,249	13.0	95.9
1624	Penn Township	Clearfield	1,249	24.2	51.6
1624	Farmington Township	Warren	1,249	34.2	36.5
1624	Center Township	Greene	1,249	48.9	25.5
1628	Glenburn Township	Lackawanna	1,248	4.8	260.5
1629	Tuscarora Township	Juniata	1,247	47.2	26.4
1630	Williamsburg borough	Blair	1,246	0.4	3404.4
1630	Banks Township	Carbon	1,246	11.6	107.2
1632	Heidelberg borough	Allegheny	1,245	0.3	4399.3
1633	Benton Township	Columbia	1,244	19.9	62.4
1634	Bloomfield borough†	Perry	1,243	0.6	2034.4
1635	Liberty Township	Adams	1,239	16.2	76.3
1635	Rose Township	Jefferson	1,239	19.2	64.4
1635	Gulich Township	Clearfield	1,239	20.0	62.0
1638	Marion Township	Centre	1,238	22.0	56.2
1639	Marion Township	Butler	1,237	25.4	48.6
1640	Loganville borough	York	1,236	1.0	1244.7
1641	Dalton borough	Lackawanna	1,233	3.1	401.1
1642	Renovo borough	Clinton	1,231	1.1	1088.4
1643	Duncansville borough	Blair	1,228	0.5	2308.3
1643	Summerhill Township	Crawford	1,228	25.4	48.3
1645	West Mayfield borough	Beaver	1,227	0.8	1543.4
1645	Lemon Township	Wyoming	1,227	16.7	73.7
1647	Factoryville borough	Wyoming	1,226	0.7	1717.1
1647	King Township	Bedford	1,226	15.7	77.9
1647	Black Lick Township	Indiana	1,226	27.9	43.9
1650	North Heidelberg Township	Berks	1,225	13.8	88.5
1651	Sandy Lake Township	Mercer	1,224	24.6	49.7
1652	Troy Township	Crawford	1,217	31.7	38.4
1653	Leetsdale borough	Allegheny	1,215	1.2	1034.0
1654	Perry Township	Jefferson	1,214	28.7	42.3
1654	Gibson Township	Susquehanna	1,214	32.1	37.8
1654	Eldred Township	Jefferson	1,214	46.6	26.1
1657	Buffalo Township	Perry	1,213	20.2	60.1
1658	Dale borough	Cambria	1,210	0.2	6875.0
1659	Hollenback Township	Luzerne	1,208	15.2	79.7
1660	McConnellsburg borough†	Fulton	1,207	0.4	3362.1
1660	Biglerville borough	Adams	1,207	0.7	1848.4
1662	Duboistown borough	Lycoming	1,205	0.7	1774.7
1663	Roulette Township	Potter	1,204	32.6	36.9
1664	Wiconisco Township	Dauphin	1,203	9.8	123.2
1664	Madison Township	Clarion	1,203	27.8	43.3
1666	Wilmot Township	Bradford	1,202	44.7	26.9
1667	Columbia Township	Bradford	1,200	40.9	29.3
1668	East Conemaugh borough	Cambria	1,196	0.3	4317.7
1669	Castanea Township	Clinton	1,190	5.9	203.1
1670	Bethel Township	Armstrong	1,187	15.9	74.8
1671	Tuscarora Township	Perry	1,185	29.5	40.1
1672	Hawley borough	Wayne	1,184	0.6	1919.0
1672	Piatt Township	Lycoming	1,184	10.1	117.3
1672	Wayne Township	Armstrong	1,184	45.0	26.3
1675	Penn Township	Centre	1,183	28.4	41.7
1676	Colerain Township	Bedford	1,181	42.0	28.1
1677	Wayne Township	Greene	1,178	39.3	30.0
1678	Bradford Woods borough	Allegheny	1,177	0.9	1322.5
1679	Forest Lake Township	Susquehanna	1,172	29.9	39.2
1680	Christiana borough	Lancaster	1,171	0.5	2205.3
1681	South Bend Township	Armstrong	1,167	22.6	51.6
1682	Jefferson Township	Washington	1,166	22.6	51.5
1683	Nescopeck Township	Luzerne	1,165	18.7	62.4
1684	West Kittanning borough	Armstrong	1,163	0.4	2711.0
1684	Prospect borough	Butler	1,163	4.1	284.9
1684	Brady Township	Huntingdon	1,163	31.4	37.1
1687	Millbourne borough	Delaware	1,162	0.07	15702.7
1688	Jackson Township	Venango	1,161	24.7	47.0
1689	Orwell Township	Bradford	1,159	32.4	35.7
1690	Ellport borough	Lawrence	1,157	0.5	2498.9
1691	Frazer Township	Allegheny	1,156	9.3	123.7
1691	Towanda Township	Bradford	1,156	15.5	74.5
1693	Galeton borough	Potter	1,155	1.3	891.9
1694	Point Marion borough	Fayette	1,149	0.5	2455.1
1695	Speers borough	Washington	1,146	1.1	1050.4
1695	Sykesville borough	Jefferson	1,146	1.6	720.8
1697	Knox borough	Clarion	1,143	0.6	2019.4
1697	Tatamy borough	Northampton	1,143	0.6	2012.3
1697	Durham Township	Bucks	1,143	9.4	122.0
1700	Tuscarora Township	Bradford	1,140	29.5	38.6
1701	Derry Township	Montour	1,138	16.4	69.5
1702	North Towanda Township	Bradford	1,135	9.0	126.6
1703	Dennison Township	Luzerne	1,132	35.6	31.8
1704	Shinglehouse Borough	Potter	1,129	2.1	538.6
1705	Carbondale Township	Lackawanna	1,128	14.0	80.5
1706	Osceola Mills borough	Clearfield	1,125	0.3	3409.1
1707	Rush Township	Northumberland	1,122	27.3	41.4
1708	South Creek Township	Bradford	1,120	27.9	40.1
1708	Springfield Township	Bradford	1,120	41.8	26.8
1710	Cochranton borough	Crawford	1,119	1.2	934.8
1710	Schuylkill Township	Schuylkill	1,119	9.7	115.9
1712	White Haven borough	Luzerne	1,118	1.2	897.3
1713	Limestone Township	Montour	1,117	13.4	83.5
1713	Ashland Township	Clarion	1,117	22.5	49.6
1715	Lower Tyrone Township	Fayette	1,115	16.1	69.1
1716	Milesburg borough	Centre	1,114	0.4	2492.2
1717	Williams Township	Dauphin	1,113	8.8	126.0
1717	Slocum Township	Luzerne	1,113	10.0	111.1
1719	Juniata Township	Blair	1,112	26.1	42.6
1720	Cass Township	Huntingdon	1,110	33.0	33.7
1721	Muncy Township	Lycoming	1,109	15.7	70.6
1722	Taylor Township	Fulton	1,108	32.6	33.9
1723	Cherry Township	Butler	1,107	25.9	42.8
1724	Upper Turkeyfoot Township	Somerset	1,106	38.7	28.6
1725	Central City borough	Somerset	1,105	0.5	2046.3
1726	Bally borough	Berks	1,103	0.5	2129.3
1727	Morris Township	Washington	1,102	28.4	38.8
1728	West Beaver Township	Snyder	1,101	27.6	40.0
1729	Cleveland Township	Columbia	1,099	23.4	47.1
1730	Mercer Township	Butler	1,096	12.9	85.0
1731	Thompson Township	Fulton	1,093	37.9	28.8
1732	Bessemer borough	Lawrence	1,089	1.7	629.5
1733	Thornhurst Township	Lackawanna	1,088	23.1	47.1
1734	Fairview Township	Mercer	1,087	18.5	58.6
1735	Miller Township	Perry	1,086	12.9	84.5
1736	Belle Vernon borough	Fayette	1,085	0.3	3455.4
1737	Amity Township	Erie	1,083	28.2	38.4
1737	Penn Township	Huntingdon	1,083	34.6	31.3
1739	Greene Township	Mercer	1,082	21.8	49.5
1740	Neville Township	Allegheny	1,081	2.3	461.0
1740	Oneida Township	Huntingdon	1,081	17.6	61.5
1742	Washington Township	Greene	1,080	27.2	39.8
1743	New Philadelphia borough	Schuylkill	1,075	1.5	714.3
1744	Mifflin Township	Lycoming	1,074	27.8	38.6
1745	Lincoln borough	Allegheny	1,073	5.0	214.2
1746	Westfield borough	Tioga	1,072	1.0	1107.4
1746	Oliver Township	Jefferson	1,072	30.1	35.6
1748	McCalmont Township	Jefferson	1,071	26.3	40.8
1749	West Perry Township	Snyder	1,068	27.0	39.5
1750	East Mahoning Township	Indiana	1,067	31.4	34.0
1750	Burnside Township	Clearfield	1,067	44.2	24.1
1752	Asylum Township	Bradford	1,066	26.4	40.4
1753	Lower Augusta Township	Northumberland	1,059	21.4	49.5
1754	Meshoppen Township	Wyoming	1,057	16.1	65.6
1754	Westfield Township	Tioga	1,057	23.4	45.2
1756	Redbank Township	Armstrong	1,052	32.6	32.3
1757	Liverpool Township	Perry	1,049	20.9	50.1
1758	Harrison Township	Potter	1,048	36.4	28.8
1758	Liberty Township	Tioga	1,048	64.7	16.2
1760	Walker Township	Schuylkill	1,044	22.9	45.7
1761	Plum Township	Venango	1,043	26.6	39.2
1762	Covington Township	Tioga	1,042	36.4	28.6
1763	Ivyland borough	Bucks	1,041	0.4	2932.4
1764	Stoneboro borough	Mercer	1,036	2.9	352.6
1764	Pine Township	Columbia	1,036	26.5	39.1
1766	Chicora borough	Butler	1,035	0.5	1941.8
1766	Taylor Township	Lawrence	1,035	5.5	188.7
1766	Union Township	Huntingdon	1,035	39.3	26.3
1769	South Waverly borough	Bradford	1,032	0.9	1164.8
1769	Knox Township	Clarion	1,032	16.1	64.2
1769	Knox Township	Jefferson	1,032	31.6	32.7
1772	Dunbar borough	Fayette	1,031	0.6	1698.5
1773	Falls Creek borough (comb.)	Jefferson	1,027	0.9	1097.2
1774	Elder Township	Cambria	1,026	12.9	79.3
1775	Royalton borough	Dauphin	1,025	0.3	3059.7
1776	Palo Alto borough	Schuylkill	1,023	1.0	979.9
1777	Linesville borough	Crawford	1,022	0.8	1325.6
1778	Beech Creek Township	Clinton	1,019	94.5	10.8
1779	Ellsworth borough	Washington	1,018	0.8	1346.6
1780	Union Township	Tioga	1,017	47.0	21.6
1781	Dunnstable Township	Clinton	1,015	9.6	105.6
1782	Yoe Borough	York	1,014	0.2	4260.5
1783	Abbottstown Borough	Adams	1,010	0.6	1823.1
1784	Hulmeville borough	Bucks	1,009	0.4	2705.1
1784	Fairfield Township	Crawford	1,009	19.3	52.2
1786	Bloomfield Township	Bedford	1,008	19.4	52.0
1787	Milford borough†	Pike	1,007	0.5	2014.0
1788	Packer Township	Carbon	1,004	27.9	35.9
1788	Banks Township	Indiana	1,004	31.9	31.5
1790	Susquehanna Township	Lycoming	1,003	7.2	139.7
1791	Canal Township	Venango	1,002	24.4	41.0
1792	Tioga Township	Tioga	1,001	40.4	24.8
1793	Preston Township	Wayne	999	51.5	19.4
1794	Avonmore borough	Westmoreland	997	1.6	640.7
1795	Union Township	Crawford	996	15.9	62.7
1796	Turbett Township	Juniata	995	16.5	60.2
1797	West Brownsville Borough	Washington	992	1.4	697.1
1797	Venango Township	Crawford	992	16.9	58.7
1799	Penn Township	Lycoming	991	26.6	37.3
1800	Greenwood Township	Perry	990	25.3	39.1
1801	Paint borough	Somerset	989	0.4	2825.7
1801	Terry Township	Bradford	989	33.4	29.6
1801	Lewis Township	Lycoming	989	37.4	26.4
1804	Southwest Madison Township	Perry	988	27.5	35.9
1805	Saegertown borough	Crawford	985	1.5	639.2
1806	Sugar Notch borough	Luzerne	983	1.1	909.3
1807	Toby Township	Clarion	981	29.4	33.4
1808	New Bethlehem borough	Clarion	977	0.5	1889.7
1808	Pringle borough	Luzerne	977	0.5	2101.1
1810	Trumbauersville borough	Bucks	972	0.4	2184.3
1811	Sugar Grove Township	Mercer	965	12.4	77.8
1812	Southampton Township	Bedford	963	80.2	12.0
1813	Howard Township	Centre	962	18.9	50.8
1814	Beavertown borough	Snyder	961	0.8	1251.3
1814	Addison Township	Somerset	961	63.2	15.2
1816	Moreland Township	Lycoming	960	24.0	39.9
1817	Warren Township	Bradford	959	42.8	22.4
1818	Cogan House Township	Lycoming	958	70.0	13.7
1819	Granville Township	Bradford	957	24.7	38.8
1820	Bernville borough	Berks	955	0.4	2175.4
1820	Liverpool borough	Perry	955	0.9	1084.0
1822	Lilly borough	Cambria	954	0.5	1896.6
1822	Harrison Township	Bedford	954	37.1	25.7
1824	Hopewell Township	Washington	952	16.7	56.9
1825	Todd Township	Huntingdon	951	44.4	21.4
1826	Brooklyn Township	Susquehanna	950	24.5	38.8
1827	Franklin Township	Lycoming	947	13.0	72.6
1828	Millville borough	Columbia	945	1.0	955.5
1828	Perry Township	Clarion	945	30.1	31.4
1830	Crawford Township	Clinton	944	22.1	42.6
1830	Juniata Township	Bedford	944	47.5	19.9
1832	Goldsboro borough	York	943	0.5	2077.1
1832	Windham Township	Bradford	943	32.3	29.2
1834	Bechtelsville borough	Berks	942	0.5	1861.7
1834	Highland Township	Adams	942	12.2	77.4
1836	East Prospect borough	York	941	0.3	2949.8
1836	Arendtsville borough	Adams	941	0.8	1150.4
1838	Mifflintown borough†	Juniata	940	0.1	6714.3
1839	Rose Valley borough	Delaware	939	0.7	1282.8
1840	Rimersburg borough	Clarion	936	0.4	2571.4
1841	McClure borough	Snyder	935	3.8	248.7
1842	Port Royal borough	Juniata	934	0.6	1551.5
1843	Catawissa Township	Columbia	933	12.9	72.4
1843	Boggs Township	Armstrong	933	24.9	37.5
1845	Cooper Township	Montour	932	7.2	129.8
1846	East Brady borough	Clarion	931	1.1	840.3
1846	Washington Township	Armstrong	931	23.3	39.9
1848	Stockertown borough	Northampton	926	1.0	927.9
1849	Barry Township	Schuylkill	923	16.8	54.9
1849	Franklin Township	Susquehanna	923	28.1	32.9
1851	Karthaus Township	Clearfield	921	35.8	25.7
1852	Henderson Township	Huntingdon	919	26.3	35.0
1853	Blythe Township	Schuylkill	917	27.8	33.0
1854	Clay Township	Huntingdon	916	28.5	32.2
1855	Beaver Township	Columbia	914	35.8	25.5
1855	Black Township	Somerset	914	42.7	21.4
1857	Marion Township	Beaver	913	10.5	87.1
1858	Mount Jewett borough	McKean	912	2.4	385.8
1859	Sugarloaf Township	Columbia	910	26.3	34.6
1860	South Fork borough	Cambria	909	0.5	1814.4
1860	East Fairfield Township	Crawford	909	12.8	70.8
1860	Albany Township	Bradford	909	32.9	27.7
1863	Midway borough	Washington	908	0.4	2063.6
1864	Worth Township	Mercer	906	24.9	36.5
1865	Export borough	Westmoreland	905	0.4	2245.7
1865	Adams Township	Snyder	905	20.6	43.9
1867	Bowmanstown borough	Carbon	904	0.8	1132.8
1867	Mehoopany Township	Wyoming	904	17.9	50.5
1869	Millheim borough	Centre	900	1.3	680.3
1869	Ceres Township	McKean	900	40.8	22.0
1871	Harrisville borough	Butler	899	0.8	1114.0
1872	Eulalia Township	Potter	897	31.1	28.8
1873	Hyndman borough	Bedford	896	0.5	1697.0
1874	Union Township	Clearfield	893	31.6	28.3
1875	Elmhurst Township	Lackawanna	890	1.9	459.9
1875	Jackson Township	Northumberland	890	14.2	62.9
1877	Noxen Township	Wyoming	888	28.7	30.9
1878	Beaver Township	Crawford	886	36.6	24.2
1879	Harmony borough	Butler	885	0.4	2207.0
1879	Anthony Township	Lycoming	885	15.6	56.7
1881	Pleasantville Borough	Venango	878	1.0	924.2
1881	Sweden Township	Potter	878	33.8	25.9
1881	West Finley Township	Washington	878	39.1	22.4
1884	Rockwood borough	Somerset	877	0.3	2625.7
1885	Richhill Township	Greene	876	54.4	16.1
1886	Salem Township	Clarion	875	16.3	53.6
1887	Jordan Township	Lycoming	874	20.9	41.8
1887	Sharon Township	Potter	874	34.1	25.7
1889	Chester Hill borough	Clearfield	873	0.5	1841.8
1889	Rural Valley borough	Armstrong	873	2.1	413.5
1891	Washington Township	Cambria	871	12.6	69.2
1892	Silverdale borough	Bucks	869	0.4	2104.1
1892	Smithfield borough	Fayette	869	0.7	1223.9
1894	New Berlin borough	Union	868	0.4	2180.9
1894	Venango Township	Butler	868	21.0	41.4
1894	Jackson Township	Huntingdon	868	72.5	12.0
1897	Riegelsville borough	Bucks	867	1.1	803.5
1898	Saltsburg borough	Indiana	864	0.2	3512.2
1898	Middlecreek Township	Somerset	864	33.4	25.9
1900	Taylor Township	Centre	861	30.8	28.0
1901	Beaver Meadows borough	Carbon	857	0.3	3321.7
1901	Chapman Township	Clinton	857	101.0	8.5
1903	West Middlesex borough	Mercer	856	0.8	1013.0
1903	Spruce Hill Township	Juniata	856	21.8	39.4
1905	East Norwegian Township	Schuylkill	855	4.1	209.8
1906	Hubley Township	Schuylkill	848	13.3	63.6
1907	Union Township	Jefferson	847	17.7	48.0
1908	New Milford borough	Susquehanna	846	1.0	832.7
1909	Clinton Township	Venango	845	28.7	29.4
1910	Oil Creek Township	Venango	843	23.0	36.6
1911	Carrolltown borough	Cambria	840	0.7	1213.9
1911	Beale Township	Juniata	840	21.9	38.4
1913	Halifax borough	Dauphin	838	0.3	2494.0
1913	Parker city	Armstrong	838	1.0	876.6
1913	Jackson Township	Susquehanna	838	26.5	31.6
1916	North Irwin borough	Westmoreland	837	0.2	4143.6
1917	Spring Creek Township	Warren	836	48.8	17.1
1918	Shickshinny borough	Luzerne	835	0.5	1673.3
1918	Wolf Creek Township	Mercer	835	17.1	48.9
1920	Windham Township	Wyoming	834	23.2	36.0
1921	Lathrop Township	Susquehanna	832	20.5	40.5
1922	York Springs borough	Adams	830	0.2	3860.5
1922	Freedom Township	Adams	830	14.0	59.2
1924	Wells Township	Bradford	829	33.9	24.5
1925	Worth Township	Centre	828	21.7	38.2
1925	White Township	Cambria	828	22.7	36.4
1927	Eldred borough	McKean	827	0.9	972.9
1928	Claysville borough	Washington	824	0.3	2615.9
1929	Manchester Township	Wayne	822	45.0	18.3
1930	Logan Township	Clinton	821	24.3	33.9
1931	West Marlborough Township	Chester	820	17.1	48.0
1932	Benton borough	Columbia	819	0.6	1331.7
1933	Sewickley Heights borough	Allegheny	818	7.3	112.6
1933	Rutland Township	Tioga	818	35.4	23.1
1933	Morris Township	Greene	818	35.7	22.9
1936	Madison Township	Armstrong	812	30.9	26.3
1937	Plain Grove Township	Lawrence	811	17.9	45.2
1937	Brush Creek Township	Fulton	811	54.3	14.9
1939	Ringtown borough	Schuylkill	809	0.4	1842.8
1939	Polk borough	Venango	809	2.0	396.4
1941	Roscoe borough	Washington	808	0.2	3311.5
1942	Oklahoma borough	Westmoreland	802	0.6	1251.2
1942	Steuben Township	Crawford	802	24.6	32.7
1942	Genesee Township	Potter	802	35.7	22.4
1945	Chalfant borough	Allegheny	801	0.2	5037.7
1946	Burlington Township	Bradford	798	25.3	31.6
1947	Rutledge borough	Delaware	797	0.1	5573.4
1948	Jordan Township	Northumberland	796	17.3	46.1
1949	Washington Township	Lawrence	795	16.4	48.6
1950	Upper Mahanoy Township	Northumberland	794	23.4	34.0
1951	Dauphin borough	Dauphin	790	0.4	1824.5
1952	West Lebanon Township	Lebanon	789	0.4	2007.6
1952	Lack Township	Juniata	789	57.0	13.8
1954	Houtzdale borough	Clearfield	788	0.4	2057.4
1954	Mifflin Township	Dauphin	788	15.5	50.8
1956	Everson borough	Fayette	787	0.2	4077.7
1957	West Taylor Township	Cambria	786	6.1	128.3
1957	Sandy Creek Township	Mercer	786	16.0	49.0
1959	Northeast Madison Township	Perry	785	25.8	30.4
1960	New Salem borough	York	779	0.5	1646.9
1961	Lake Township	Mercer	773	16.5	46.8
1962	Richland Township	Venango	771	22.4	34.4
1963	Snow Shoe borough	Centre	769	0.6	1305.6
1964	Confluence borough	Somerset	767	1.7	456.5
1965	French Creek Township	Mercer	766	20.9	36.7
1965	Gamble Township	Lycoming	766	45.8	16.7
1967	Scalp Level borough	Cambria	764	0.7	1159.3
1968	Oregon Township	Wayne	763	18.0	42.5
1969	Conneautville borough	Crawford	762	1.0	734.8
1970	Gilberton borough	Schuylkill	761	1.5	523.7
1970	Bradys Bend Township	Armstrong	761	12.6	60.3
1972	Gratz borough	Dauphin	759	2.9	257.4
1973	Herrick Township	Bradford	758	22.7	33.4
1974	Koppel borough	Beaver	756	0.6	1321.7
1974	Gordon borough	Schuylkill	756	0.6	1274.9
1974	Bell Township	Clearfield	756	56.9	13.3
1977	Conyngham Township	Columbia	755	20.5	36.9
1978	Nicholson borough	Wyoming	754	1.2	638.4
1979	Salem Township	Mercer	752	13.4	56.2
1980	Eldred Township	Schuylkill	751	22.3	33.7
1981	East Cameron Township	Northumberland	750	12.2	61.7
1982	Vandling borough	Lackawanna	748	1.3	569.7
1983	Lorain borough	Cambria	746	0.3	2200.6
1983	Washington Township	Northumberland	746	18.1	41.2
1985	Scrubgrass Township	Venango	745	27.8	26.8
1986	Athens Township	Crawford	735	28.3	26.0
1987	Courtdale borough	Luzerne	734	1.0	729.6
1987	Ringgold Township	Jefferson	734	19.3	38.1
1987	Grant Township	Indiana	734	27.0	27.2
1990	Auburn borough	Schuylkill	733	1.7	437.9
1990	Franklin Township	Bradford	733	33.7	21.7
1992	Delaware Water Gap borough	Monroe	732	2.1	354.8
1993	Brownstown borough	Cambria	731	0.2	3123.9
1994	Howard borough	Centre	729	0.4	2002.7
1995	Delta borough	York	728	0.3	2778.6
1995	Hamlin Township	McKean	728	64.3	11.3
1997	Jefferson borough	York	727	0.6	1199.7
1998	Stewart Township	Fayette	726	50.9	14.3
1999	East Butler borough	Butler	725	1.0	695.1
2000	Catharine Township	Blair	724	30.8	23.5
2001	Saxton borough	Bedford	722	0.4	1778.3
2001	Deemston borough	Washington	722	9.6	75.3
2003	Reilly Township	Schuylkill	719	15.7	45.9
2003	Mill Creek Township	Mercer	719	19.4	37.1
2005	Leroy Township	Bradford	718	44.6	16.2
2005	Great Bend Borough	Susquehanna	718	0.3	2272.2
2005	Salisbury Borough	Somerset	718	0.4	1869.8
2008	Wood Township	Huntingdon	717	16.5	43.6
2008	Tionesta Township	Forest	717	46.5	15.4
2010	Middle Taylor Township	Cambria	716	4.8	149.9
2011	Sligo Borough	Clarion	712	1.4	505.0
2012	Nippenose Township	Lycoming	710	11.5	61.6
2013	Herrick Township	Susquehanna	707	24.9	28.4
2014	York Haven borough	York	705	0.3	2169.2
2014	Union Township	Fulton	705	30.5	23.1
2016	Bridgewater borough	Beaver	704	0.7	967.0
2016	Wampum borough	Lawrence	704	1.0	682.8
2018	Beech Creek borough	Clinton	703	0.6	1264.4
2019	Choconut Township	Susquehanna	702	20.3	34.6
2020	Kilbuck Township	Allegheny	701	2.6	270.0
2020	Gaskill Township	Jefferson	701	21.5	32.6
2022	Turbotville borough	Northumberland	700	0.4	1559.0
2022	Burrell Township	Armstrong	700	22.0	31.8
2022	Annin Township	McKean	700	33.4	20.9
2025	North Abington Township	Lackawanna	699	9.3	75.1
2026	Colley Township	Sullivan	698	59.2	11.8
2028	Thompsontown borough	Juniata	695	0.3	2131.9
2028	Bingham Township	Potter	695	35.7	19.4
2030	Munster Township	Cambria	694	14.1	49.1
2031	Armstrong Township	Lycoming	693	25.5	27.2
2032	Deer Lake borough	Schuylkill	692	0.5	1469.2
2032	West Burlington Township	Bradford	692	24.1	28.7
2034	Sewickley Hills borough	Allegheny	689	2.5	272.5
2034	Allegheny Township	Somerset	689	51.1	13.5
2034	Plunketts Creek Township	Lycoming	689	54.1	12.7
2037	Blaine Township	Washington	687	11.9	57.8
2038	Jennerstown borough	Somerset	686	2.0	344.7
2039	Briar Creek borough	Columbia	685	1.8	372.1
2040	Pike Township	Bradford	684	27.7	24.7
2041	Exeter Township	Wyoming	682	3.4	200.9
2042	Deerfield Township	Tioga	680	29.2	23.3
2043	New Florence borough	Westmoreland	679	0.3	2070.1
2044	Picture Rocks borough	Lycoming	678	1.0	677.3
2044	Tidioute borough	Warren	678	1.2	562.7
2044	Brownsville Township	Fayette	678	1.5	438.3
2047	Nuangola borough	Luzerne	677	1.2	559.5
2048	Logan Township	Huntingdon	675	23.0	29.3
2049	Tioga borough	Tioga	673	0.5	1416.8
2050	Greenville Township	Somerset	671	25.1	26.8
2051	Millerstown borough	Perry	670	0.9	729.1
2051	Lebanon Township	Wayne	670	38.2	17.6
2053	Pennsbury Village borough	Allegheny	668	0.1	8789.5
2054	East Vandergrift borough	Westmoreland	667	0.1	4600.0
2055	Sankertown borough	Cambria	665	0.3	2254.2
2055	Standing Stone Township	Bradford	665	16.2	41.0
2057	Osceola Township	Tioga	664	13.6	48.9
2058	East Chillisquaque Township	Northumberland	663	8.1	82.1
2059	Valley Township	Armstrong	657	14.7	44.6
2060	Tell Township	Huntingdon	656	42.6	15.4
2061	Sandy Lake borough	Mercer	653	0.8	784.9
2062	Springfield Township	Huntingdon	651	27.5	23.7
2062	Harmony Township	Forest	651	34.5	18.9
2064	Upper Mahantongo Township	Schuylkill	648	14.8	43.6
2065	Whiteley Township	Greene	647	31.7	20.4
2066	Ulysses Township	Potter	646	75.5	8.6
2067	Farmington Township	Tioga	644	31.7	20.3
2068	Conneaut Lake borough	Crawford	643	0.4	1776.2
2069	Mifflin borough	Juniata	641	0.2	3683.9
2069	Knox Township	Clearfield	641	26.0	24.7
2071	Bendersville borough	Adams	640	0.5	1415.9
2071	Knoxville borough	Tioga	640	0.5	1400.4
2071	Eldred Township	Warren	640	36.2	17.7
2074	Allegheny Township	Butler	639	24.6	25.9
2075	Irvona borough	Clearfield	638	0.9	672.3
2076	Hooversville borough	Somerset	635	0.6	1039.3
2077	Jackson Township	Columbia	632	18.4	34.3
2077	Larimer Township (comb.)	Somerset	632	21.2	29.8
2077	Parker Township	Butler	632	22.9	27.5
2077	Southampton Township	Somerset	632	29.3	21.6
2080	Worthington borough	Armstrong	631	0.7	917.2
2080	Cranesville borough	Erie	631	0.9	671.3
2082	Patterson Heights borough	Beaver	630	0.2	2669.5
2082	Cokeburg borough	Washington	630	0.4	1789.8
2082	Greenwood Township	Juniata	630	19.5	32.4
2085	Clark borough	Mercer	629	3.6	173.7
2086	Mill Creek Township	Lycoming	628	11.4	55.0
2087	Winterstown borough	York	627	2.4	259.7
2088	Ulysses borough	Potter	623	4.1	153.7
2090	Big Run borough	Jefferson	618	0.7	870.4
2091	Emlenton borough (comb.)	Venango, Clarion	615	0.6	1047.7
2092	Marion Heights borough	Northumberland	614	0.2	3054.7
2092	Curtin Township	Centre	614	43.3	14.2
2094	Lawrenceville borough	Tioga	611	0.6	1048.0
2094	Dushore borough	Sullivan	611	0.8	760.0
2094	Lewis Run borough	McKean	611	1.8	348.3
2097	Yatesville Borough	Luzerne	609	0.6	1000.0
2097	Morris Township	Tioga	609	74.0	8.2
2099	Jamestown borough	Mercer	608	0.8	725.5
2100	Sugar Grove borough	Warren	607	1.1	541.5
2101	Port Matilda borough	Centre	606	0.6	1076.4
2102	Oakland borough	Susquehanna	604	0.5	1198.4
2103	Chatham Township	Tioga	600	35.2	17.0
2104	La Plume Township	Lackawanna	598	2.4	245.4
2105	Sutersville borough	Westmoreland	597	0.3	2023.7
2106	Lower Turkeyfoot Township	Somerset	596	36.3	16.4
2106	Hebron Township	Potter	596	43.7	13.6
2108	West Fallowfield Township	Crawford	595	11.7	50.8
2109	Fayette City borough	Fayette	592	0.3	2330.7
2109	Wyalusing borough	Bradford	592	0.8	745.6
2109	Hopewell Township	Huntingdon	592	27.8	21.3
2113	Franklin Township	Columbia	590	13.5	43.6
2114	Clymer Township	Tioga	588	34.0	17.3
2115	Warrior Run borough	Luzerne	586	0.7	782.4
2116	Otter Creek Township	Mercer	584	11.8	49.4
2117	Nelson Township	Tioga	583	11.6	50.4
2118	Connoquenessing borough	Butler	582	1.4	427.0
2118	Scott Township	Wayne	582	44.3	13.1
2120	Wall borough	Allegheny	579	0.4	1321.9
2120	Elkland Township	Sullivan	579	38.7	15.0
2120	Norwich Township	McKean	579	95.5	6.1
2123	Davidson Township	Sullivan	573	77.9	7.4
2124	Meshoppen borough	Wyoming	570	0.8	733.6
2125	West Township	Huntingdon	569	31.1	18.3
2126	Valencia borough	Butler	568	0.3	1700.6
2126	Freeburg borough	Snyder	568	0.3	1780.6
2126	Austin borough	Potter	568	4.0	140.6
2129	East Rochester borough	Beaver	562	0.5	1229.8
2130	Bastress Township	Lycoming	560	9.4	59.4
2131	Potter Township	Beaver	558	6.9	80.5
2132	New Alexandria borough	Westmoreland	557	0.8	657.6
2133	Ararat Township	Susquehanna	556	19.2	28.9
2134	Gaines Township	Tioga	554	48.6	11.4
2135	Oakland Township	Susquehanna	551	16.7	32.9
2136	Juniata Township	Huntingdon	550	20.2	27.3
2137	Monroe borough	Bradford	549	0.5	1100.2
2138	Watson Township	Lycoming	547	23.4	23.4
2139	West Cameron Township	Northumberland	546	11.9	45.9
2139	Hickory Township	Forest	546	38.0	14.4
2141	Juniata Terrace borough	Mifflin	545	0.2	3244.0
2141	Dayton borough	Armstrong	545	0.4	1449.5
2141	Strattanville borough	Clarion	545	0.5	1079.2
2141	Glen Osborne borough	Allegheny	545	0.6	968.0
2145	Licking Township	Clarion	544	17.9	30.4
2145	Roaring Creek Township	Columbia	544	23.5	23.1
2147	Jackson Township	Perry	542	37.3	14.5
2148	Hamilton Township	McKean	538	74.5	7.2
2149	Newell borough	Fayette	537	0.8	703.8
2150	Shippen Township	Tioga	536	48.8	3.4
2151	Allenport borough	Washington	535	2.2	242.3
2151	Brady Township	Lycoming	535	9.1	59.1
2153	Modena borough	Chester	534	0.4	1512.7
2154	President Township	Venango	533	38.9	13.7
2155	Mineral Township	Venango	532	22.3	23.9
2156	Girard Township	Clearfield	529	63.6	8.3
2157	Jessup Township	Susquehanna	528	21.3	24.8
2158	Summerville borough	Jefferson	523	0.6	843.5
2158	Beaver Township	Snyder	523	18.5	28.2
2160	McIntyre Township	Lycoming	522	47.5	11.0
2161	Parryville borough	Carbon	520	1.6	319.4
2161	Highland Township	Clarion	520	20.2	25.7
2161	Covington Township	Clearfield	520	53.1	9.8
2164	Southwest Township	Warren	519	34.0	15.2
2165	Portland borough	Northampton	518	0.6	915.2
2165	Harmony Township	Susquehanna	518	31.6	16.4
2167	Bruin borough	Butler	517	1.8	283.1
2167	Hydetown borough	Crawford	517	2.3	229.3
2169	West Elizabeth borough	Allegheny	516	0.2	2089.1
2169	Coalport borough	Clearfield	516	0.4	1361.5
2171	Laurel Run borough	Luzerne	515	5.2	99.3
2172	Elk Township	Warren	514	43.7	11.8
2173	Rouseville borough	Venango	513	0.9	566.9
2174	Seven Valleys borough	York	512	1.1	470.2
2174	Cross Roads borough	York	512	1.8	281.6
2174	Hamilton Township	Tioga	512	11.0	46.5
2174	Green Township	Forest	512	42.4	12.1
2178	Felton borough	York	509	0.6	807.9
2179	Green Lane borough	Montgomery	508	0.3	1498.5
2179	Stockdale borough	Washington	508	0.3	1649.4
2179	New Vernon Township	Mercer	508	16.3	31.1
2179	Chest Township	Clearfield	508	36.0	14.1
2183	Fairfield borough	Adams	506	0.7	754.1
2183	Buckingham Township	Wayne	506	45.4	11.2
2185	Orangeville borough	Columbia	502	0.5	1108.2
2185	Apolacon Township	Susquehanna	502	22.7	22.1
2187	Clintonville borough	Venango	501	1.1	458.0
2187	West Shenango Township	Crawford	501	9.0	55.6
2189	West Hemlock Township	Montour	499	7.7	64.7
2189	Aleppo Township	Greene	499	28.0	17.9
2191	Lanesboro borough	Susquehanna	496	2.7	187.0
2191	Braintrim Township	Wyoming	496	6.2	80.4
2191	Deer Creek Township	Mercer	496	14.9	33.4
2194	Fredonia borough	Mercer	494	0.4	1383.8
2194	Ogle Township	Somerset	494	34.6	14.3
2196	Hyde Park borough	Westmoreland	493	0.3	1671.2
2196	Beaver Township	Jefferson	493	21.4	23.0
2198	Mann Township	Bedford	492	35.7	13.8
2199	Penn borough	Westmoreland	491	0.2	3127.4
2200	Marianna borough	Washington	490	2.0	250.5
2201	Seward borough	Westmoreland	488	0.2	2415.8
2201	Richland Township	Clarion	488	15.8	30.9
2201	Highland Township	Elk	488	86.9	5.6
2204	Hawthorn borough	Clarion	487	1.1	448.8
2205	Franklintown borough	York	484	0.3	1936.0
2206	Jackson Township	Greene	482	28.7	16.8
2207	Lehigh Township	Carbon	481	26.5	18.2
2208	Summerhill borough	Cambria	480	0.3	1441.4
2209	Porter Township	Pike	478	60.5	7.9
2210	Petersburg borough	Huntingdon	477	0.3	1432.4
2211	Lyons borough	Berks	476	0.4	1337.1
2212	South Bethlehem borough	Armstrong	474	0.2	3118.4
2212	Carmichaels borough	Greene	474	0.2	2788.2
2212	Shippenville borough	Clarion	474	0.3	1544.0
2212	Little Mahanoy Township	Northumberland	474	10.5	45.2
2216	Vanderbilt borough	Fayette	473	0.2	2702.9
2216	Barree Township	Huntingdon	473	24.1	19.6
2218	Tionesta borough†	Forest	472	1.4	343.3
2219	Wells Township	Fulton	471	37.4	12.6
2220	South Heights borough	Beaver	470	0.4	1140.8
2220	Loganton borough	Clinton	470	1.1	445.1
2222	Franklin Township	Huntingdon	469	40.6	11.5
2223	Springboro borough	Crawford	468	0.8	564.5
2224	Jordan Township	Clearfield	463	23.4	19.8
2225	Beallsville borough	Washington	461	2.4	189.9
2226	Bolivar borough	Westmoreland	458	0.2	2558.7
2226	Miller Township	Huntingdon	458	22.2	20.6
2228	Finleyville borough	Washington	457	0.2	2736.5
2228	Rices Landing borough	Greene	457	0.9	501.6
2230	Ernest borough	Indiana	456	0.2	1932.2
2235	Cooperstown borough	Venango	508	0.6	814.1
2231	Mechanicsville borough	Schuylkill	454	0.3	1392.6
2231	Pine Township	Crawford	454	12.6	36.0
2233	Thornburg borough	Allegheny	453	0.4	1043.8
2234	Fawn Grove borough	York	452	1.6	274.8
2236	Broad Top City borough	Huntingdon	450	0.7	664.7
2237	Garrett borough	Somerset	449	0.5	887.4
2238	Piney Township	Clarion	448	18.0	24.9
2239	Ramey borough	Clearfield	446	0.9	478.5
2240	Clarendon Borough	Warren	445	0.3	1320.5
2240	Long Branch borough	Washington	445	3.2	139.5
2242	Clover Township	Jefferson	444	16.1	27.5
2243	Marion Center borough	Indiana	443	0.7	596.2
2243	Ferguson Township	Clearfield	443	23.4	18.9
2245	Three Springs borough	Huntingdon	442	1.2	358.5
2246	Glendon borough	Northampton	441	0.6	715.9
2247	South Renovo borough	Clinton	440	0.2	1888.4
2247	Delano Township	Schuylkill	440	8.1	54.3
2247	Toboyne Township	Perry	440	56.2	7.8
2250	Stevens Township	Bradford	439	15.7	28.0
2251	Mapleton borough	Huntingdon	438	0.2	2293.2
2251	Buck Township	Luzerne	438	16.8	26.1
2251	Burnside Township	Centre	438	90.4	4.8
2254	Rome borough	Bradford	436	0.5	825.8
2255	Greene Township	Greene	434	18.5	23.4
2255	Homer Township	Potter	434	32.0	13.6
2257	Goshen Township	Clearfield	433	48.8	8.9
2258	Putnam Township	Tioga	429	0.6	686.4
2259	Brookfield Township	Tioga	425	31.8	13.4
2259	Allegany Township	Potter	425	40.5	10.5
2261	Orbisonia borough	Huntingdon	424	0.1	4326.5
2261	Rosslyn Farms borough	Allegheny	424	0.6	755.8
2261	Platea borough	Erie	424	3.3	126.8
2261	Frailey Township	Schuylkill	424	9.2	46.2
2265	Lincoln Township	Bedford	417	16.3	25.6
2266	Cascade Township	Lycoming	415	39.5	10.5
2267	Morris Township	Huntingdon	413	12.2	34.0
2268	Bloom Township	Clearfield	411	18.9	21.8
2269	Shrewsbury Township	Lycoming	409	18.7	21.8
2270	New Castle Township	Schuylkill	407	12.5	32.7
2270	Thompson Township	Susquehanna	407	22.2	18.3
2272	Weissport borough	Carbon	406	0.2	2586.0
2272	Mill Village borough	Erie	406	0.9	441.8
2272	Pine Township	Armstrong	406	4.6	88.3
2275	Vintondale borough	Cambria	405	0.5	831.6
2276	Brisbin borough	Clearfield	404	0.7	554.9
2276	Victory Township	Venango	404	20.9	19.4
2278	Manorville borough	Armstrong	403	0.1	3358.3
2279	Howe Township	Forest	401	87.5	4.6
2280	Middleport borough	Schuylkill	400	0.4	911.2
2281	West Branch Township	Potter	398	62.2	6.4
2282	Wattsburg borough	Erie	397	0.3	1284.8
2283	Limestone Township	Warren	395	31.9	12.4
2283	Jackson Township	Lycoming	395	37.3	10.6
2285	St. Petersburg borough	Clarion	394	0.3	1235.1
2285	Indian Lake borough	Somerset	394	4.3	90.6
2287	Smithton borough	Westmoreland	393	0.1	3359.0
2288	Centerport borough	Berks	392	0.2	2052.4
2288	Millcreek Township	Clarion	392	29.3	13.4
2290	Madison borough	Westmoreland	391	0.4	896.8
2291	Callery borough	Butler	390	0.5	726.3
2291	Westover borough	Clearfield	390	2.8	141.8
2291	Howe Township	Perry	390	8.5	45.7
2291	Hector Township	Potter	390	41.1	9.5
2291	Forkston Township	Wyoming	390	70.6	5.5
2296	Gallagher Township	Clinton	386	53.7	7.2
2297	McKean borough	Erie	385	0.6	660.4
2298	Forks Township	Sullivan	384	43.4	8.8
2299	Dean Township	Cambria	382	20.9	18.3
2300	Dunlevy borough	Washington	381	0.6	666.1
2301	New Galilee borough	Beaver	379	0.3	1350.2
2302	Carbon Township	Huntingdon	375	18.6	20.2
2303	Ford Cliff borough	Armstrong	373	0.1	4907.9
2303	Ben Avon Heights borough	Allegheny	373	0.2	2156.1
2303	Laceyville borough	Wyoming	373	0.2	1932.6
2303	Middletown Township	Susquehanna	373	28.9	12.9
2307	Greenwood Township	Clearfield	372	20.7	18.0
2307	Warren Township	Franklin	372	30.6	12.1
2309	Noyes Township (comb.)	Clinton	370	141.4	2.6
2310	Rockhill borough	Huntingdon	369	0.3	1268.0
2311	Berrysburg borough	Dauphin	368	0.6	607.3
2312	Dawson borough	Fayette	364	0.2	1725.1
2312	Arona borough	Westmoreland	364	0.5	693.3
2312	Jefferson Township	Dauphin	364	24.4	14.9
2315	Lewisberry borough	York	362	0.1	2604.3
2316	Mahaffey borough	Clearfield	361	0.4	828.0
2317	Tunnelhill borough (comb.)	Cambria, Blair	360	0.5	730.2
2318	Fox Township	Sullivan	359	38.9	9.2
2319	Cherry Tree borough	Indiana	357	0.5	668.5
2320	Elderton borough	Armstrong	356	0.3	1102.2
2320	New Albany borough	Bradford	356	0.5	767.2
2322	Barnett Township	Forest	355	34.4	10.3
2322	Laporte Township	Sullivan	355	54.2	6.6
2322	Kingsley Township	Forest	355	61.3	5.8
2325	Bloss Township	Tioga	354	23.5	15.0
2326	Corsica borough	Jefferson	353	0.4	875.9
2327	Chest Township	Cambria	352	29.2	12.1
2328	Perry Township	Armstrong	350	15.0	23.3
2329	Grampian borough	Clearfield	349	0.3	1237.6
2330	Stoystown borough	Somerset	348	0.2	1831.6
2330	South Versailles Township	Allegheny	348	1.0	358.8
2332	Saltillo borough	Huntingdon	346	0.3	1373.0
2333	West Liberty borough	Butler	344	3.9	88.7
2333	Springhill Township	Greene	344	22.0	15.7
2335	McVeytown borough	Mifflin	341	0.1	3217.0
2336	Alexandria borough	Huntingdon	340	0.1	3207.5
2337	Cadogan Township	Armstrong	338	1.1	305.3
2337	Northampton Township	Somerset	338	35.9	9.4
2339	Newburg borough	Cumberland	337	0.2	1821.6
2340	Snydertown borough	Northumberland	335	3.5	95.5
2340	Lincoln Township	Huntingdon	335	21.0	16.0
2340	Deerfield Township	Warren	335	43.8	7.7
2343	Schellsburg borough	Bedford	334	0.3	1315.0
2343	Blooming Valley borough	Crawford	334	2.0	169.9
2345	Pike Township	Potter	328	36.6	9.0
2346	Mill Creek borough	Huntingdon	327	0.3	1003.1
2346	Hop Bottom Borough	Susquehanna	327	0.6	536.9
2348	Port Clinton borough	Schuylkill	324	0.8	422.4
2349	Shrewsbury Township	Sullivan	323	47.6	6.8
2350	Youngstown borough	Westmoreland	322	0.1	2900.9
2350	Daisytown Borough	Cambria	322	0.2	1370.2
2352	Kistler Borough	Mifflin	321	0.3	1268.8
2353	Herndon Borough	Northumberland	320	1.9	170.9
2354	Elco Borough	Washington	319	0.4	898.6
2355	Townville borough	Crawford	318	0.5	618.7
2356	Franklin Borough	Cambria	316	0.6	557.3
2357	Laporte borough†	Sullivan	315	1.2	255.7
2358	Keating Township	Potter	314	41.5	7.6
2359	East Side borough	Carbon	313	1.2	271.7
2360	Wallaceton borough	Clearfield	311	0.8	406.0
2360	Eau Claire borough	Butler	311	1.3	243.9
2360	Triumph Township	Warren	311	28.5	10.9
2363	Penn Lake Park borough	Luzerne	309	1.6	189.1
2364	Creekside borough	Indiana	307	0.2	1346.5
2365	Freeport Township	Greene	306	8.1	37.8
2366	Applewold borough	Armstrong	305	0.039	6489.4
2366	Plumville Borough	Indiana	305	0.5	614.9
2368	Porter Township	Jefferson	302	17.5	17.2
2369	Pillow borough	Dauphin	298	0.5	604.5
2369	Enon Valley borough	Lawrence	298	0.5	600.8
2369	Spartansburg borough	Crawford	298	0.7	420.3
2372	Manns Choice borough	Bedford	296	0.5	585.0
2372	Pine Township	Lycoming	296	75.1	3.9
2374	Thompson borough	Susquehanna	291	0.5	568.4
2374	Hillsgrove Township	Sullivan	291	28.5	10.2
2376	Le Raysville borough	Bradford	290	1.0	277.5
2377	Unionville borough	Centre	289	0.2	1219.4
2377	Hunker borough	Westmoreland	289	0.3	1142.3
2379	Pavia Township	Bedford	288	22.1	13.0
2380	Hartleton borough	Union	284	0.9	312.8
2381	Markleysburg borough	Fayette	282	0.3	940.0
2381	Oswayo Township	Potter	282	37.3	7.6
2383	McEwensville borough	Northumberland	281	0.1	2401.7
2384	Woodbury Borough	Bedford	280	0.1	2089.6
2385	Railroad borough	York	278	0.6	435.7
2385	Tremont Township	Schuylkill	278	24.2	11.5
2387	Washingtonville borough	Montour	274	0.1	5074.1
2387	New Ringgold borough	Schuylkill	274	0.8	342.9
2387	Corydon Township	McKean	274	73.4	3.7
2390	Allegheny Township	Venango	273	25.0	10.9
2391	Newry borough	Blair	271	0.1	2765.3
2391	Cummings Township	Lycoming	271	70.0	3.9
2393	Watson Township	Warren	270	51.2	5.3
2394	Little Meadows borough	Susquehanna	269	2.4	111.0
2395	Orrstown borough	Franklin	263	0.1	4109.4
2396	Jefferson borough	Greene	262	0.2	1393.6
2396	Polk Township	Jefferson	262	30.5	8.6
2398	Blain borough	Perry	261	0.3	820.8
2399	Fallston borough	Beaver	260	0.5	504.9
2400	Greensboro borough	Greene	258	0.1	1767.1
2400	Bear Creek Village borough	Luzerne	258	2.0	126.7
2402	Union Dale borough	Susquehanna	256	2.5	103.7
2403	Liberty borough	Tioga	255	0.6	442.7
2403	West Abington Township	Lackawanna	255	5.6	45.8
2403	Gilmore Township	Greene	255	23.0	11.1
2406	Darlington borough	Beaver	253	0.1	3085.4
2406	Wellsville borough	York	253	0.1	1756.9
2406	Foster Township	Schuylkill	253	13.2	19.2
2409	Mayberry Township	Montour	252	7.2	34.8
2410	Barnett Township	Jefferson	251	15.1	16.6
2411	Hopewell borough	Bedford	248	0.1	2137.9
2412	Overton Township	Bradford	246	47.0	5.2
2413	Prompton borough	Wayne	244	1.7	144.5
2414	Venango borough	Crawford	243	0.3	883.6
2414	Glen Campbell borough	Indiana	243	0.9	261.0
2414	Abbott Township	Potter	243	70.0	3.5
2417	Salladasburg borough	Lycoming	242	0.8	306.3
2418	Troutville borough	Clearfield	241	0.8	312.6
2419	Bethany borough	Wayne	239	0.5	477.0
2419	Spruce Creek Township	Huntingdon	239	8.5	28.0
2419	Reed Township	Dauphin	239	8.6	27.9
2422	Portersville borough	Butler	236	0.8	296.9
2423	Shanksville borough	Somerset	235	0.2	1192.9
2424	Lausanne Township	Carbon	234	6.0	39.3
2425	Twilight Borough	Washington	233	1.6	144.7
2425	Burnside Borough	Clearfield	233	1.7	134.3
2427	Rush Township	Dauphin	231	24.5	9.4
2428	Spring Creek Township	Elk	230	64.3	3.6
2429	Yorkana borough	York	229	0.2	1339.2
2430	New Columbus borough	Luzerne	228	3.1	74.4
2430	Portage Township	Potter	228	37.5	6.1
2432	Clarksville borough	Greene	227	0.1	2340.2
2433	Eastvale borough	Beaver	225	0.1	1923.1
2433	Ehrenfeld borough	Cambria	225	0.4	505.6
2435	Ashville borough	Cambria	224	0.2	1251.4
2436	Wilmore borough	Cambria	222	0.3	668.7
2436	Jackson Center borough	Mercer	222	1.1	195.1
2438	Sylvania borough	Bradford	221	1.1	198.0
2439	Gray Township	Greene	220	4.2	51.9
2440	Landisburg borough	Perry	219	0.1	3128.6
2440	Ursina borough	Somerset	219	0.9	243.3
2442	Elgin borough	Erie	217	1.5	147.2
2443	Centerville borough	Crawford	216	1.8	122.0
2444	Glenfield borough	Allegheny	215	1.0	217.6
2445	Shippingport borough	Beaver	214	3.7	58.1
2445	Cherry Grove Township	Warren	214	46.3	4.6
2447	Karns City borough	Butler	213	0.4	586.8
2448	Petrolia borough	Butler	211	0.4	532.8
2448	Duncan Township	Tioga	211	19.8	10.6
2450	Stillwater borough	Columbia	210	3.2	66.5
2451	North Branch Township	Wyoming	208	22.5	9.2
2452	Barkeyville borough	Venango	207	3.1	67.0
2453	Callensburg borough	Clarion	206	0.1	1420.7
2454	Newton Hamilton borough	Mifflin	205	0.2	1108.1
2454	Addison borough	Somerset	205	0.5	376.8
2456	Marklesburg borough	Huntingdon	204	1.1	194.3
2456	Benezette Township	Elk	204	107.2	1.9
2458	Colebrook Township	Clinton	201	18.6	10.8
2458	Clara Township	Potter	201	19.6	10.2
2460	Fairview borough	Butler	200	0.1	1769.9
2461	Chapman borough	Northampton	199	0.4	555.9
2462	Mount Gretna borough	Lebanon	198	0.1	1375.0
2463	Pleasantville borough	Bedford	195	0.1	2635.1
2463	Allison Township	Clinton	195	1.6	119.9
2465	Roseville borough	Tioga	192	0.5	422.0
2466	West Sunbury borough	Butler	191	0.1	1736.4
2467	Lumber Township	Cameron	190	55.2	3.4
2468	Benson borough	Somerset	189	0.4	533.9
2468	Summit Township	Potter	189	49.2	3.8
2470	Utica borough	Venango	187	1.5	128.2
2471	New Lebanon borough	Mercer	186	1.3	145.5
2472	Armenia Township	Bradford	185	18.4	10.0
2473	New Paris borough	Bedford	184	0.1	3172.4
2474	Dudley borough	Huntingdon	183	0.3	557.9
2475	Foxburg borough	Clarion	182	0.5	364.0
2476	Cooke Township	Cumberland	180	19.9	9.1
2476	Leidy Township	Clinton	180	97.1	1.9
2478	Wellersburg borough	Somerset	179	0.8	221.0
2479	New Baltimore borough	Somerset	178	0.3	513.0
2479	Ward Township	Tioga	178	34.4	5.2
2481	Grove Township	Cameron	177	73.9	2.4
2482	Georgetown borough	Beaver	174	0.3	693.2
2483	McNett Township	Lycoming	173	33.9	5.1
2484	Adamsburg borough	Westmoreland	171	0.3	610.7
2485	Starrucca borough	Wayne	169	9.0	18.8
2486	Portage Township	Cameron	167	14.5	11.5
2487	Lenhartsville borough	Berks	166	0.1	1220.6
2487	Volant borough	Lawrence	166	0.1	1371.9
2487	Laurel Mountain borough	Westmoreland	166	0.1	1286.8
2490	Bear Lake borough	Warren	162	0.7	233.1
2491	Coaldale borough	Bedford	159	0.03	4676.5
2491	Gibson Township	Cameron	159	94.6	1.7
2493	Landingville borough	Schuylkill	158	0.9	184.1
2494	Alba Borough	Bradford	157	0.7	234.0
2495	Burlington borough	Bradford	156	0.6	260.4
2495	Woodcock borough	Crawford	156	0.7	234.9
2497	Timblin borough	Jefferson	155	1.0	162.3
2498	Shirleysburg borough	Huntingdon	149	0.2	931.3
2499	Hookstown borough	Beaver	147	0.1	1088.9
2499	Chest Springs borough	Cambria	147	0.2	761.7
2501	Forksville borough	Sullivan	146	1.6	92.8
2502	Cassandra borough	Cambria	145	0.1	1907.9
2503	McHenry Township	Lycoming	143	76.7	1.9
2504	Cassville Borough	Huntingdon	142	0.6	239.5
2505	Sheakleyville borough	Mercer	141	0.2	719.4
2505	Glen Hope borough	Clearfield	141	2.2	64.9
2507	Oswayo borough	Potter	140	1.4	101.4
2507	Sergeant Township	McKean	140	80.2	1.7
2509	Coal Center borough	Washington	139	0.1	1007.2
2509	West Middletown borough	Washington	139	0.4	342.4
2511	Rainsburg borough	Bedford	135	0.2	828.2
2512	Fairhope Township	Somerset	133	14.6	9.1
2513	New Centerville borough	Somerset	132	0.1	929.6
2514	Frankfort Springs borough	Beaver	130	0.3	500.0
2515	Shelocta borough	Indiana	129	0.1	1228.6
2516	New Buffalo borough	Perry	128	0.1	2169.5
2517	Heath Township	Jefferson	123	29.2	4.2
2518	Armagh borough	Indiana	121	0.1	2122.8
2518	Donegal borough	Westmoreland	121	0.2	533.0
2520	Eagles Mere borough	Sullivan	120	2.2	53.5
2521	Homewood borough	Beaver	109	0.2	645.0
2521	Friendsville borough	Susquehanna	109	1.5	72.9
2523	Coalmont borough	Huntingdon	106	0.1	883.3
2523	Atwood borough	Armstrong	106	2.1	50.2
2525	Shade Gap borough	Huntingdon	105	0.1	3281.3
2526	Wharton Township	Potter	100	113.3	0.9
2527	Jeddo borough	Luzerne	98	0.3	347.5
2527	Brown Township	Lycoming	98	74.0	1.3
2529	Hovey Township	Armstrong	97	2.2	45.1
2530	Casselman borough	Somerset	95	0.2	470.3
2531	Newburg borough	Clearfield	91	1.9	49.1
2532	Birmingham borough	Huntingdon	90	0.1	1428.6
2532	Mount Carbon borough	Schuylkill	90	0.1	1304.3
2534	Pleasant Valley Township	Potter	87	19.6	4.4
2535	Millstone Township	Elk	81	41.6	1.9
2536	St. Clairsville borough	Bedford	77	0.03	2566.7
2536	Sylvania Township	Potter	77	29.7	2.6
2538	Stewardson Township	Potter	74	74.1	1.0
2539	New Morgan borough	Berks	71	5.7	12.4
2540	Haysville borough	Allegheny	70	0.2	300.4
2541	Worthville borough	Jefferson	66	0.3	189.7
2541	Driftwood borough	Cameron	66	2.6	25.8
2541	Cherry Valley borough	Butler	66	2.8	23.4
2544	Glasgow borough	Beaver	60	0.1	545.5
2544	Pine Township	Clearfield	60	31.9	1.9
2546	Ohiopyle borough	Fayette	59	0.5	118.5
2546	New Washington borough	Clearfield	59	2.3	25.7
2548	Brady Township	Clarion	55	2.2	24.5
2549	Cold Spring Township	Lebanon	53	24.8	2.1
2550	Grugan Township	Clinton	52	69.4	0.7
2551	Elk Township	Tioga	50	73.2	0.7
2552	Smicksburg borough	Indiana	46	0.1	315.1
2554	Green Hills borough	Washington	29	0.9	30.9
2554	West Keating Township	Clinton	29	38.5	0.8
2556	Seven Springs borough (comb.)	Fayette, Somerset	26	1.1	24.0
2557	S.N.P.J. borough	Lawrence	19	0.8	24.5
2558	Valley-Hi borough	Fulton	15	0.6	26.4
2559	Centralia borough	Columbia	7	0.2	41.7

== See also ==
- List of cities in Pennsylvania
- List of counties in Pennsylvania
- List of Pennsylvania Municipalities and Counties with Home Rule Charters, Optional Charters, or Optional Plans
- List of towns and boroughs in Pennsylvania
- List of townships in Pennsylvania
