= List of places in Pennsylvania: R =

This list of cities, towns, unincorporated communities, counties, and other recognized places in the U.S. state of Pennsylvania also includes information on the number and names of counties in which the place lies, and its lower and upper zip code bounds, if applicable.

Name of place	Number of counties	Principal county	Lower zip code	Upper zip code
Raberts Corner	1	Lehigh County		
Raccoon	1	Washington County		
Raccoon Township	1	Beaver County		
Rachelwood	1	Westmoreland County		
Racine	1	Beaver County	15010	
Radebaugh	1	Westmoreland County	15601	
Rader	1	Clarion County		
Radnor Station	1	Delaware County		
Radnor Township	1	Delaware County	19087	
Rager Summit	1	Mifflin County		
Rahn Township	1	Schuylkill County		
Rahns	1	Montgomery County	19426	
Railroad	1	York County	17355	
Rainey Junction	1	Fayette County		
Raineytown	1	Fayette County	15428	
Rainsburg	1	Bedford County	15522	
Raker	1	Northumberland County		
Ralph	1	Fayette County		
Ralpho Township	1	Northumberland County		
Ralphton	1	Somerset County	15563	
Ralston	1	Lycoming County	17763	
Ramblewood	1	Centre County		
Rambo	1	Montgomery County		
Ramey	1	Clearfield County	16671	
Ramsay Terrace	1	Westmoreland County	15666	
Ramsaytown	1	Jefferson County		
Ramsey	1	Lycoming County	17740	
Ranavilla	1	Cumberland County	17011	
Rand	1	Allegheny County	15227	
Rand	1	Union County		
Randolph	1	Somerset County		
Randolph Township	1	Crawford County		
Ranges Corners	1	Erie County		
Rankin	1	Allegheny County	15104	
Ranshaw	1	Northumberland County	17866	
Ransom	1	Lackawanna County	18653	
Ransom Township	1	Lackawanna County		
Rapho Township	1	Lancaster County		
Raricks	1	Schuylkill County		
Rasler Run	1	Fayette County		
Rasleytown	1	Northampton County	18072	
Rasselas	1	Elk County	15870	
Rathbun	1	Elk County	15834	
Rathmel	1	Jefferson County	15851	
Rattigan	1	Butler County	16025	
Raubenstine	1	York County		
Raubs Mills	1	Snyder County		
Raubsville	1	Northampton County	18042	
Rauchtown	1	Clinton County	17740	
Rausch Creek	1	Schuylkill County		
Rauschs	1	Schuylkill County	17960	
Raven Creek	1	Columbia County	17814	
Raven Run	1	Schuylkill County	17946	
Ravine	1	Schuylkill County	17966	
Rawlinsville	1	Lancaster County	17532	
Rayard	1	Jefferson County		
Rayburn Township	1	Armstrong County		
Raymilton	1	Venango County	16342	
Raymond	1	Potter County	16923	
Rayne Township	1	Indiana County		
Raytown	1	Indiana County	15742	
Rea	1	Washington County	15356	
Reade Township	1	Cambria County		
Reading	1	Berks County	19601	12
Reading Gardens	1	Berks County	19606	
Reading Junction	1	Somerset County		
Reading Mines	1	Somerset County	15563	
Reading Number Three	1	Somerset County		
Reading Township	1	Adams County		
Reagantown	1	Westmoreland County	15679	
Reamstown	1	Lancaster County	17567	
Reamstown Heights	1	Lancaster County	17567	
Rebel Hill	1	Montgomery County	19428	
Rebersburg	1	Centre County	16872	
Rebuck	1	Northumberland County	17867	
Rector	1	Westmoreland County	15677	
Red Bank	1	Clarion County		
Red Bank	1	Union County	17844	
Red Barn	1	Indiana County		
Red Bridge	1	Franklin County	17201	
Red Bridge	1	McKean County	16735	
Red Cedar Hill	1	Bucks County		
Red Cross	1	Northumberland County	17823	
Red Hill	1	Blair County	16601	
Red Hill	1	Luzerne County		
Red Hill	1	Montgomery County	18076	
Red Hot	1	Allegheny County		
Red Lion	1	Berks County	18062	
Red Lion	1	Chester County	19348	
Red Lion	1	York County	17356	
Red Mill	1	Cambria County		
Red Mill	1	Centre County		
Red Mill	1	Jefferson County	15840	
Red Oak	1	Lackawanna County	18436	
Red Rock	1	Luzerne County	17814	
Red Rock	1	McKean County	16727	
Red Rose Gate	1	Bucks County	19058	
Red Run	1	Lancaster County	17578	
Redbank Township	1	Armstrong County		
Redbank Township	1	Clarion County		
Redbird	1	Cambria County	15946	
Redclyffe	1	Forest County	16239	
Redds Mill	1	Washington County	15022	
Redington	1	Northampton County	18055	
Redman	1	Allegheny County		
Redmond	1	Butler County		
Redstone Junction	1	Fayette County	15472	
Redstone Township	1	Fayette County		
Reduction	1	Westmoreland County	15479	
Reeceville	1	Chester County		
Reed	1	Northumberland County	17860	
Reed Township	1	Dauphin County		
Reeder	1	Bucks County	18938	
Reeders	1	Monroe County	18352	
Reeds Corners	1	Erie County		
Reeds Furnace	1	Mercer County		
Reeds Gap	1	Juniata County	17035	
Reeds Road	1	Chester County	19335	
Reedsville	1	Mifflin County	17084	
Reedy	1	Armstrong County		
Reels Corners	1	Somerset County	15926	
Rees Mill	1	Greene County		
Reese	1	Blair County	16648	
Reesedale	1	Armstrong County	16210	
Reesers Summit	1	York County		
Reevesdale	1	Schuylkill County	18252	
Refton	1	Lancaster County	17568	
Regan Junction	1	Cambria County		
Regency Park	1	Allegheny County	15239	
Register	1	Luzerne County	17878	
Rehrersburg	1	Berks County	19550	
Reidsburg	1	Clarion County	16214	
Reiffton	1	Berks County	19606	
Reightown	1	Blair County	16617	
Reilly	1	Luzerne County		
Reilly Township	1	Schuylkill County		
Reillys	1	Cambria County	16668	
Reimold	1	York County		
Reinerton	1	Schuylkill County	17980	
Reinerton-Orwin-Muir	1	Schuylkill County		
Reinholds	1	Lancaster County	17569	
Reinoeldville	1	Lebanon County	17042	
Reissing	1	Washington County	15321	
Reistville	1	Lebanon County	17067	
Reitz	1	Jefferson County		
Reitz	1	Somerset County		
Reitz No. 2	1	Somerset County	15924	
Relay	1	York County	17313	
Reliance	1	Montgomery County	18964	
Rembrant	1	Indiana County		
Remoeldville	1	Lebanon County		
Rene Mont	1	Schuylkill County		
Renfrew	1	Butler County	16053	
Rennerdale	1	Allegheny County	15106	
Renningers	1	Schuylkill County		
Reno	1	Venango County	16343	
Renovo	1	Clinton County	17764	
Renton	1	Allegheny County	15239	
Renton Junction	1	Allegheny County	15239	
Republic	1	Fayette County	15475	
Republic-Merrittstown	1	Fayette County		
Republican	1	Washington County	15419	
Reserve Township	1	Allegheny County	15212	
Reservoir	1	Blair County	16648	
Reservoir Heights	1	Dauphin County		
Reservoir Hill	1	Fayette County		
Resica Falls	1	Monroe County	18302	
Resler	1	Northumberland County		
Ressaca	1	Monroe County		
Retort	1	Centre County	16677	
Retreat	1	Luzerne County	18621	
Retta	1	Susquehanna County		
Revere	1	Bucks County	18953	
Revloc	1	Cambria County	15948	
Rew	1	McKean County	16744	
Reward	1	Perry County	17062	
Rexford	1	Tioga County	16921	
Rexis	1	Indiana County	15961	
Rexmont	1	Lebanon County	17085	
Rextown	1	Lehigh County	18080	
Reyburn	1	Luzerne County	18655	
Reynolds	1	Schuylkill County	18252	
Reynolds Heights	1	Mercer County	16125	
Reynolds Mill	1	York County		
Reynoldsdale	1	Bedford County	15554	
Reynoldstown	1	Potter County		
Reynoldsville	1	Jefferson County	15851	
Rhawnhurst	1	Philadelphia County	19111	
Rheems	1	Lancaster County	17570	
Rhoads	1	Centre County		
Rhone	1	Luzerne County	18634	
Ribold	1	Butler County		
Ribot	1	Huntingdon County	16669	
Rice Township	1	Luzerne County		
Rices Landing	1	Greene County	15357	
Riceville	1	Crawford County	16432	
Richards Grove	1	Lycoming County	17774	
Richardsville	1	Jefferson County	15852	
Richboro	1	Bucks County	18954	
Richboro Manor	1	Bucks County	18954	
Richeyville	1	Washington County	15358	
Richfield	1	Juniata County	17086	
Richfol	1	Washington County	15317	
Rich Hill	1	Bucks County	18951	
Rich Hill	1	Washington County	15347	
Richhill Township	1	Greene County		
Richland	1	Delaware County		
Richland	1	Lebanon County	17087	
Richland Center	1	Bucks County		
Richland Township	1	Allegheny County		
Richland Township	1	Bucks County		
Richland Township	1	Cambria County		
Richland Township	1	Clarion County		
Richland Township	1	Venango County		
Richlandtown	1	Bucks County	18955	
Richmond	1	Northampton County	18013	
Richmond	1	Philadelphia County	19134	
Richmond Furnace	1	Franklin County	17224	
Richmond Junction	1	Philadelphia County		
Richmond Township	1	Berks County		
Richmond Township	1	Crawford County		
Richmond Township	1	Tioga County		
Richmondale	1	Lackawanna County	18421	
Richvale	1	Huntingdon County	17213	
Rickenbach	1	Berks County		
Ricketts	1	Luzerne County		
Rico	1	Indiana County		
Riddle Crossroads	1	Venango County		
Riddlesburg	1	Bedford County	16672	
Riddlewood	1	Delaware County	19063	
Riderville	1	McKean County	16738	
Ridge Branch Junction	1	Indiana County		
Ridge Park	1	Berks County	19607	
Ridge Valley	1	Bucks County	18960	
Ridge View	1	Westmoreland County	15666	
Ridgebury	1	Bradford County	14894	
Ridgebury Township	1	Bradford County		
Ridgemont	1	Centre County		
Ridgeview	1	Dauphin County	17112	
Ridgeview Park	1	Westmoreland County	15627	
Ridgeville	1	Montour County	17821	
Ridgewood	1	Berks County	19508	
Ridgewood	1	Luzerne County	18705	
Ridgewood Farm	1	Chester County	19380	
Ridgewood Park	1	Delaware County	19083	
Ridgway	1	Elk County	15853	
Ridgway Township	1	Elk County		
Ridley Farms	1	Delaware County	19070	
Ridley Gardens	1	Delaware County	19043	
Ridley Park	1	Delaware County	19078	
Ridley Parkview	1	Delaware County	19078	
Ridley Township	1	Delaware County		
Riegelsville	1	Bucks County	18077	
Rienze	1	Bradford County		
Rife	1	Dauphin County	17061	
Riggles Gap	1	Blair County		
Riggs	1	Bradford County	18850	
Riggs	1	Greene County		
Riker	1	Jefferson County		
Rileyville	1	Wayne County		
Rillton	1	Westmoreland County	15678	
Rimer	1	Armstrong County	16259	
Rimersburg	1	Clarion County	16248	
Rimerton	1	Armstrong County	16259	
Rinely	1	York County	17363	
Ringdale	1	Sullivan County	18614	
Ringertown	1	Westmoreland County	15626	
Ringgold	1	Jefferson County	15770	
Ringgold Township	1	Jefferson County		
Ringing Hill	1	Montgomery County	19464	
Ringing Rock Park	1	Montgomery County	19464	
Ringlands	1	Washington County		
Ringtown	1	Berks County	19539	
Ringtown	1	Schuylkill County	17967	
Rippletown	1	Luzerne County		
Risher Mine Siding	1	Allegheny County	15122	
Rising Springs	1	Centre County		
Rising Sun	1	Lehigh County	18080	
Rismiller	1	Northampton County		
Rita	1	Luzerne County		
Ritchie	1	Clinton County		
Riterville	1	McKean County		
Rittenhouse	1	Luzerne County		
Rittenhouse Gap	1	Berks County	18062	
Ritters Crossroads	1	Lycoming County		
Ritterville	1	Lehigh County		
Ritts	1	Clarion County		
Ritzie Village	1	Dauphin County	17112	
River Hill	1	Allegheny County	15063	
River Valley	1	Allegheny County	15024	
River View	1	Armstrong County	15960	
River View	1	Washington County	15067	
Riverside	1	Cambria County	15904	
Riverside	1	Dauphin County		
Riverside	1	Lackawanna County	18403	
Riverside	1	Northumberland County	17868	
Riverside Junction	1	Lackawanna County	18403	
Riverton	1	Allegheny County		
Riverton	1	Northampton County	18013	
Riverview	1	Beaver County	15010	
Riverview	1	Clarion County		
Riverview	1	Clearfield County	16830	
Riverview	1	Clinton County		
Riverview Acres	1	Lehigh County	18080	
River View Park	1	Berks County	19605	
Rixford	1	McKean County	16745	
Roadside	1	Franklin County	17268	
Roaring Branch	2	Lycoming County	17765	
Roaring Branch	2	Tioga County	17765	
Roaring Brook	1	Luzerne County		
Roaring Brook Township	1	Lackawanna County		
Roaring Creek	1	Columbia County	17820	
Roaring Creek Township	1	Columbia County		
Roaring Run	2	Fayette County	15662	
Roaring Run	2	Westmoreland County	15662	
Roaring Spring	1	Blair County	16673	
Robb	1	Westmoreland County	15944	
Robbins	1	Westmoreland County		
Robert Bruce West	1	Montgomery County	19040	
Roberts	1	Somerset County		
Robertsdale	1	Huntingdon County	16674	
Robertsville	1	Jefferson County	15767	
Robeson	1	Berks County	19508	
Robeson Extension	1	Blair County	16693	
Robeson Township	1	Berks County		
Robesonia	1	Berks County	19551	
Robin Hood Lakes	1	Monroe County	18058	
Robindale	1	Indiana County		
Robinson	1	Indiana County	15949	
Robinson	1	Lawrence County		
Robinson Township	1	Allegheny County		
Robinson Township	1	Washington County		
Robinsonville	1	Bedford County		
Rocherty	1	Lebanon County	17042	
Rochester	1	Beaver County	15074	
Rochester Mills	1	Indiana County	15771	
Rochester Township	1	Beaver County		
Rock	1	Schuylkill County	17963	
Rockdale	1	Bucks County	19007	
Rockdale	1	Butler County		
Rockdale	1	Delaware County	19014	
Rockdale	1	Franklin County		
Rockdale	1	Jefferson County	15840	
Rockdale	1	Lackawanna County		
Rockdale	1	Lehigh County	18080	
Rockdale Acres	1	Crawford County		
Rockdale Township	1	Crawford County		
Rockefeller Township	1	Northumberland County		
Rockey	1	York County		
Rock Falls Park	1	Butler County		
Rock Glen	1	Luzerne County	18246	
Rock Lake	1	Wayne County	18453	
Rock Point	1	Lawrence County		
Rock Run	1	Chester County	19320	
Rock Works	1	Fayette County	15461	
Rockhill	1	Bucks County	18960	
Rockhill	1	Huntingdon County	17249	
Rockhill	1	Lancaster County	17516	
Rockhill Furnace	1	Huntingdon County	17249	
Rockhill Station	1	Bucks County		
Rockingham	1	Somerset County	15924	
Rockland	1	Venango County	16374	
Rockland Township	1	Berks County		
Rockland Township	1	Venango County		
Rockledge	1	Montgomery County	19046	
Rockmere	1	Venango County		
Rockport	1	Carbon County	18255	
Rockrimmin Ridge	1	Lancaster County	17540	
Rockspring	1	Centre County	16865	
Rocks Works	1	Fayette County	15401	
Rockton	1	Clearfield County	15856	
Rocktown	1	Westmoreland County	15688	
Rockview	1	Centre County	16823	
Rockville	1	Armstrong County	16226	
Rockville	1	Bedford County		
Rockville	1	Cambria County	15956	
Rockville	1	Centre County		
Rockville	1	Chester County	19344	
Rockville	1	Clarion County		
Rockville	1	Dauphin County	17110	
Rockville	1	Juniata County	17059	
Rockville	1	Lawrence County		
Rockville	1	Mifflin County	17004	
Rockville	1	Northampton County	18038	
Rockville	1	York County	17327	
Rockwood	1	Lebanon County	17042	
Rockwood	1	Somerset County	15557	
Rocky Forest	1	Wyoming County		
Rocky Glen	1	Lackawanna County	18507	
Rocky Grove	1	Venango County	16323	
Rocky Hill	1	Chester County	19380	
Rocky Ridge	1	Bucks County		
Rocky Valley	1	Bucks County		
Roddys	1	Somerset County		
Rodi	1	Allegheny County		
Rodman	1	Blair County	16673	
Rodney	1	Westmoreland County	15610	
Roeders	1	Schuylkill County		
Roedersville	1	Schuylkill County	17963	
Roelofs	1	Bucks County		
Roemersville	1	Pike County		
Rogers Mill	1	Fayette County	15469	
Rogers Stop	1	Washington County	15022	
Rogerstown	1	Fayette County	15425	
Rogersville	1	Greene County	15359	
Rogertown	1	Warren County	16313	
Rohnersburg	1	Berks County		
Rohrerstown	1	Lancaster County	17603	
Rohrsburg	1	Columbia County	17859	
Roler	1	York County	17315	
Rolfe	1	Elk County	15845	
Rolling Glen	1	Chester County	19341	
Rolling Hills	1	Berks County	19607	
Rolling Hills	1	Lehigh County	18052	
Rolling Park	1	Delaware County	19013	
Rolling Stone	1	Clearfield County		
Romansville	1	Chester County	19320	
Romar	1	Cambria County		
Rome	1	Bradford County	18837	
Rome Township	1	Bradford County		
Rome Township	1	Crawford County		
Romney	1	Fayette County		
Romola	1	Centre County		
Ronco	1	Fayette County	15476	
Ronks	1	Lancaster County	17572	
Rook	1	Allegheny County	15220	
Roots	1	Blair County		
Roots Crossing	1	Blair County	16686	
Rootville	1	Crawford County		
Rosas	1	Pike County		
Roscoe	1	Washington County	15477	
Rose	1	Jefferson County		
Rose Crest	1	Allegheny County	15146	
Rose Gardens	1	Venango County		
Rose Point	1	Lawrence County	16101	
Rose Township	1	Jefferson County		
Rose Tree	1	Delaware County	19063	
Rose Valley	1	Delaware County	19063	
Rose Valley	1	Montgomery County	19002	
Rose Valley Acres	1	Delaware County	19063	
Roseann	1	Mifflin County	17063	
Roseboro	1	Indiana County		
Rosebud	1	Clearfield County	16627	
Roseburg	1	Perry County	17074	
Rosecrans	1	Clinton County	17747	
Rosedale	1	Allegheny County	15147	
Rosedale	1	Bucks County	18981	
Rosedale	1	Chester County	19317	
Rosedale	1	Fayette County	15401	
Rosedale Heights	1	Allegheny County	15147	
Rosegarden	1	York County		
Roseglen	1	Montgomery County		
Roseglen	1	Perry County	17020	
Rosehill	1	Philadelphia County	19140	
Roselawn	1	Blair County	16601	
Rosemont	2	Delaware County	19010	
Rosemont	2	Montgomery County	19010	
Rosemont Terrace	1	Lehigh County		
Rosengrant	1	Wyoming County		
Roses	1	Forest County	16239	
Roseto	1	Northampton County	18013	
Rosetree Woods	1	Delaware County	19008	
Roseville	1	Jefferson County	15825	
Roseville	1	Lancaster County	17601	
Roseville	1	Tioga County	16933	
Roseville	1	York County		
Rosewood Gardens	1	Bucks County	18974	
Rosewood Park	1	Bucks County		
Roslyn	1	Chester County	19380	
Roslyn	1	Montgomery County	19001	
Ross Common	1	Monroe County	18353	
Ross Siding	1	Lycoming County	17723	
Ross Township	1	Allegheny County		
Ross Township	1	Luzerne County		
Ross Township	1	Monroe County		
Rossford	1	Armstrong County	16226	
Rossiter	1	Indiana County	15772	
Rossland	1	Monroe County		
Rosslyn	1	Allegheny County		
Rosslyn Farms	1	Allegheny County	15106	
Rossmere	1	Lancaster County	17601	
Rossmoyne	1	Cumberland County	17011	
Rossmoyne	1	Indiana County		
Rossmoyne Manor	1	Cumberland County		
Rosston	1	Armstrong County	16226	
Rossville	1	York County	17358	
Rostraver	1	Westmoreland County	15012	
Rostraver Township	1	Westmoreland County		
Rote	1	Clinton County	17751	
Rothsville	1	Lancaster County	17573	
Rough and Ready	1	Schuylkill County	17941	
Roulette	1	Potter County	16746	
Roulette Township	1	Potter County		
Round Head	1	Berks County		
Round Knob	1	Bedford County		
Round Top	1	Adams County	17325	
Roundtop	1	Juniata County		
Roundtop	1	Tioga County		
Roundtown	1	York County	17404	
Rouseville	1	Venango County	16344	
Rouzerville	1	Franklin County	17250	
Rowena	1	Lancaster County		
Rowena	1	Somerset County		
Rowes Run	1	Fayette County	15442	
Rowland	1	Pike County	18457	
Rowland Park	1	Montgomery County	19012	
Roxborough	1	Philadelphia County	19128	
Roxbury	1	Cambria County		
Roxbury	1	Cumberland County	17055	
Roxbury	1	Franklin County	17251	
Roxbury	1	Somerset County	15530	
Roxton	1	Bucks County		
Royal	1	Fayette County	15422	
Royal	1	Susquehanna County	18446	
Royalton	1	Dauphin County	17057	
Royer	1	Blair County	16693	
Royersford	1	Montgomery County	19468	
Roystone	1	Warren County	16347	
Roytown	1	Somerset County		
Rozel Park	1	Bucks County	18966	
Ruble	1	Fayette County	15478	
Ruble Mill	1	Fayette County		
Ruchsville	1	Lehigh County	18037	
Rudytown	1	York County	17070	
Ruff Creek	1	Greene County	15329	
Ruffs Dale	1	Westmoreland County	15679	
Ruffsdale	1	Westmoreland County		
Ruggles	1	Wyoming County	18618	
Rule Corners	1	Luzerne County		
Rumbels	1	Luzerne County		
Rumilla	1	Montgomery County	18964	
Rummel	1	Somerset County	15963	
Rummerfield	1	Bradford County	18853	
Rundell	1	Crawford County	16406	
Runville	1	Centre County	16823	
Rupert	1	Columbia County	17815	
Ruppletown	1	Bucks County		
Ruppsville	1	Lehigh County	18090	
Rural Ridge	1	Allegheny County	15075	
Rural Valley	1	Armstrong County	16249	
Rural Valley	1	Washington County		
Ruscombmanor Township	1	Berks County		
Rush	1	Susquehanna County	18801	
Rush Crossroads	1	Greene County		
Rush Township	1	Centre County		
Rush Township	1	Dauphin County		
Rush Township	1	Northumberland County		
Rush Township	1	Schuylkill County		
Rush Township	1	Susquehanna County		
Rushboro	1	Susquehanna County		
Rushland	1	Bucks County	18956	
Rushtown	1	Northumberland County	17821	
Rushville	1	Susquehanna County	18839	
Russell	1	Warren County	16345	
Russell City	1	Elk County		
Russell Hill	1	Wyoming County	18657	
Russellton	1	Allegheny County	15076	
Russellville	1	Chester County	19363	
Russellville	1	Huntingdon County	16657	
Rutan	1	Greene County	15341	
Rutherford	1	Dauphin County	17111	
Rutherford Heights	1	Dauphin County		
Rutherton Station	1	Union County		
Ruthford	1	Cambria County	15955	
Ruthfred Acres	1	Allegheny County	15102	
Rutland	1	Tioga County		
Rutland Township	1	Tioga County		
Rutledge	1	Delaware County	19070	
Rutledgedale	1	Wayne County	18469	
Ryan Township	1	Schuylkill County		
Ryans Corner	1	Bucks County	18940	
Rydal	1	Montgomery County	19046	
Ryde	1	Mifflin County	17051	
Rye	1	York County	17313	
Rye Township	1	Perry County		
Ryeland	1	Berks County	19567	
Ryers	1	Philadelphia County		
Ryerson Station	1	Greene County	15380	
Rynd Farm	1	Venango County	16301	
Ryot	1	Bedford County	15521	
Rywal Park	1	Bucks County		
