= Southern Tioga School District =

School district in Pennsylvania

Coordinates: 41.68139°N 77.06465°W

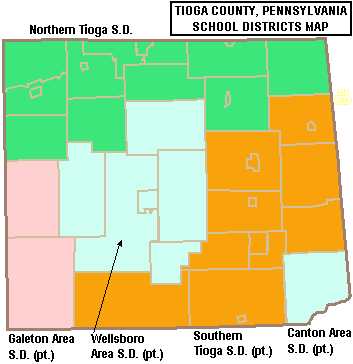

Address
- 241 Main Street Blossburg, Tioga County, Pennsylvania, 16912; United States

District information
- Type: Public
- Closed: Cogan House ES 1991, North Penn JSHS 2014

Other information
- Website: www.southerntioga.org

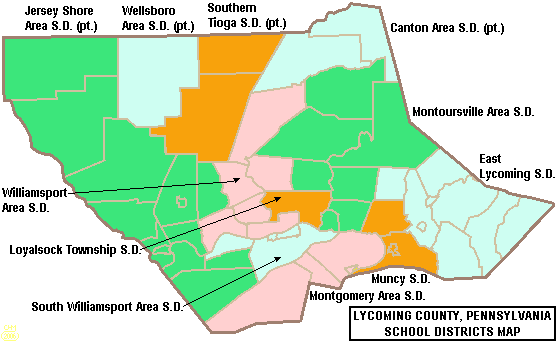
Southern Tioga School District region in Lycoming County

Southern Tioga School District is a small, rural public school system located in northern Central Pennsylvania covering parts of Tioga County and Lycoming County. It encompasses 485 square miles (1,260 km^{2}). According to 2010 federal census data, it serves a resident population of 15,551 making it a third class school district. The district operates schools in Mansfield, Liberty, and Blossburg. It serves residents in: Covington Township, Rutland Township, Richmond Township, Liberty Township, Bloss Township, Sullivan Township, Ward Township, Morris Township, and Hamilton Township, as well as Roseville Borough and Putnam. In Lycoming County, Southern Tioga School District serves both: Jackson Township and Cogan House Township.

According to the Pennsylvania Budget and Policy Center, 40.6% of the district's pupils lived at 185% or below the Federal Poverty Level as shown by their eligibility for the federal free or reduced price school meal programs in 2012. In 2013 the Pennsylvania Department of Education, reported that less than 10 students in the Southern Tioga School District were homeless. In 2009, Southern Tioga School District residents' per capita income was $14,942, while the median family income was $39,106. In Tioga County, the median household income was $44,178. By 2013, the median household income in the United States rose to $52,100. In 2014, the median household income in the USA was $53,700.

Southern Tioga School District operates: 2 high schools (North Penn Mansfield Junior Senior High School and North Penn-Liberty High School) grades 7-12 and 3 elementary schools (Blossburg Elementary School, Liberty Elementary School and Warren Miller Elementary School) grades kindergarten-6th grade. Students residing in the Southern Tioga School District may choose to attend the district's myCyberCampus or one of the Commonwealth's 13 public, cyber charter schools. Cogan House Elementary School closed in 1991 and in October 2013, the school board voted to close Liberty Elementary School and North Penn Junior Senior High School effective with the 2014–15 school year, but rescinded the closure of Liberty Elementary in December of that year.

== Extracurriculars ==
Southern Tioga School District offers an extensive program of after school clubs, arts programs and a three times duplicated interscholastic athletics program.

=== Sports ===
The district funds athletics at each of its high schools.

Liberty High School:

Boys

- Basketball - A
- Soccer - A
- Tennis - AA
- Wrestling - AA

Girls

- Basketball - AA
- Softball - A
- Girls' Tennis - AA

Liberty Junior High School Sports

Boys

- Basketball
- Soccer
- Tennis

Girls

- Basketball
- Softball
- Tennis

- According to PIAA directory July 2012

Mansfield Senior High School

Boys

- Baseball - AA
- Basketball - A
- Cross Country - A
- Golf - AA

Girls

- Basketball - A
- Cross Country - A
- Golf - AA
- Soccer - A
- Softball - AA
- Volleyball - AA

Mansfield Junior High School Sports

Boys

- Basketball
- Cross Country
- Soccer
- Wrestling

Girls

- Basketball
- Cross Country
- Softball
- Volleyball
