= Rico =

Rico or RICO may refer to:

== Places in the United States ==
- Rico, Colorado, a town
- Rico, Georgia, a place in Georgia
- Rico, Pennsylvania, a place in Pennsylvania

== People and fictional characters ==
- Rico (name), a name and list of people and fictional characters with the given name, nickname or surname
- Rico (Scottish singer)
- Rico Rodriguez (musician), known simply as Rico
- Rico (footballer) or Enrico dos Santos, Brazilian footballer
- Salah Atef, Egyptian footballer known as Rico

== Music ==
- Rico International, a manufacturer of reeds, mouthpieces, and woodwind accessories
- "Rico" (song), a 1998 song the Matthew Good Band from Underdogs
- "R.I.C.O." (song), a 2015 song by Meek Mill
- Rico, a 2000 album by Matt Bianco
- Rico, a 2018 album by Berner

== Other uses ==
- Reeves Instrument Corporation, a military manufacturer
- Rico (dog) (1994–2008), Border Collie noted for its intelligence
- Racketeer Influenced and Corrupt Organizations Act or RICO, a United States law targeting organized crime
- "RICO" (Better Call Saul), a 2015 episode of Better Call Saul named after the law
- RICO and its sequel RICO: London, first-person shooter video games; see List of Nintendo Switch games (Q–Z)

== See also ==
- Rico Suave (disambiguation)
- Rio (disambiguation)
- Ríos (disambiguation)
