= George F. Kosco =

United States Navy officer (1908–1985)

Captain George F. Kosco
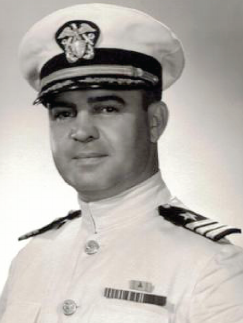
- George F. Kosco, c. 1945
- Born: George Francis Kosco; 1 April 1908; Ramsaytown, Pennsylvania, US
- Died: 11 June 1985 (aged 77); Bethesda, Maryland, US
- Burial place: Arlington National Cemetery
- Military career
- Branch: United States Navy
- Service years: 1930–1960
- Rank: Captain

Captain George Francis Kosco (1 April 1908 – 11 June 1985) was a United States Navy aerologist and polar explorer.

Kosco was born in Ramsaytown, Pennsylvania, on 1 April 1908. He was a Slovak American: his father had come from Oľšov, and his mother from Plavnica. His family name had been "Kvasnak", but this was changed to "Kosco" when his parents emigrated to the United States. Kosco graduated from the United States Naval Academy in 1930, and earned a master's degree in weather aerology from the Massachusetts Institute of Technology in 1940. His dissertation, co-authored with John O. F. Dorsett, was called Winter weather types of the eastern North Pacific and adjacent coastal and island areas.

Kosco spent much of the 1930s hurricane hunting in the Caribbean. In 1939 he married Bernadette Howley (1912–2013); the couple had three children. Bob Drury and Tom Clavin describe him as a "handsome, athletic six-footer", while Buckner F. Melton Jr. calls him "a slightly stout moon-faced officer".

Kosco was assigned to Admiral William Halsey Jr.'s Third Fleet in early October 1944. In December, the fleet was struck by Typhoon Cobra, which destroyed three ships. Kosco, aboard the USS New Jersey, reported a "tropical disturbance" 600 miles (970 km) to the east, and moving away from the fleet, when in fact it was a full-blown typhoon 200 miles (320 km) away and coming towards the fleet. Kosco later admitted to a board of inquiry that he had underestimated Cobra's strength, "basing his prediction on historical data about regional storms rather than relying upon current local observations." He was "mildly reprimanded". In 1967, Kosco published an account of the incident coauthored with Hans Christian Adamson: Halsey's Typhoons: A Firsthand Account of How Two Typhoons, More Powerful than the Japanese, Dealt Death and Destruction to Admiral Halsey's Third Fleet.

Kosco was present at the signing ceremony of the Japanese surrender on the USS Missouri at Tokyo Bay on 2 September 1945. He took what is believed to be the only color film footage of the ceremony. This was only released publicly in 2010.

In 1946 Kosco participated in Operation Nanook in the Arctic. He was then chief aerologist and chief scientist in Operation Highjump in the Antarctic with Rear Admiral Richard E. Byrd Jr. in 1946–47. He also led several other polar expeditions, collecting specimens for the Smithsonian Institution. Kosco Glacier in Antarctica was named in his honor in 1962.

Kosco retired from the Navy in 1960. He died on 11 June 1985 at Bethesda Naval Hospital, and was buried at Arlington National Cemetery.
