= North Penn =

North Penn can refer to the following:

- North Pennsylvania Railroad
- North Penn Valley, a region in Montgomery County, Pennsylvania
- North Penn School District, school district serving the North Penn Valley region
  - North Penn High School, high school in the North Penn School District
- North Penn Water Authority, water authority in the North Penn Valley region
- North Penn-Liberty High School in the Southern Tioga School District in Pennsylvania
