= Arnot, Pennsylvania =

Unincorporated place in Pennsylvania, US

- census-designated place
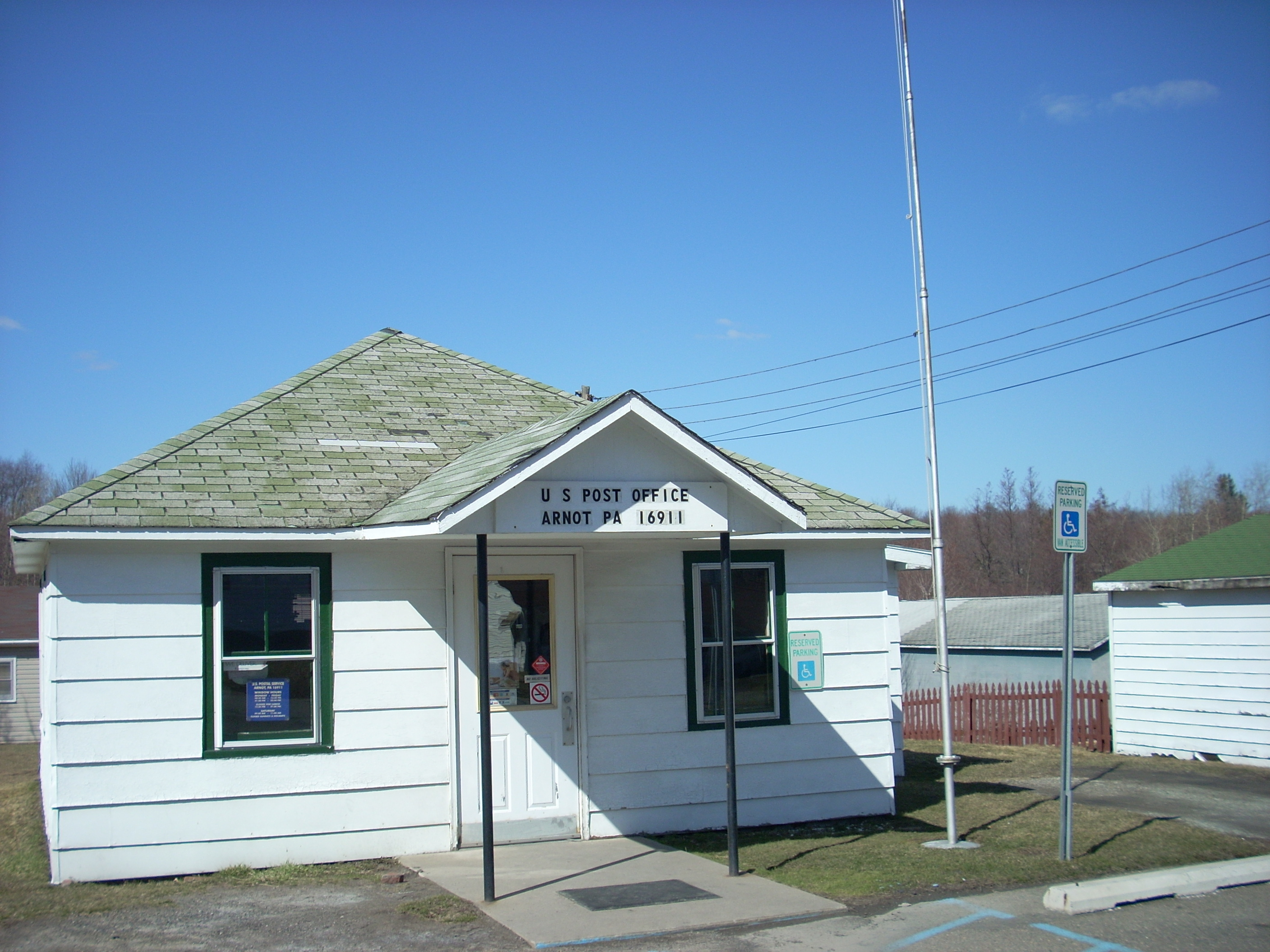
- Post office

- Location within Pennsylvania Location within the United States
- Coordinates: 41°39′47″N 77°06′52″W
- Country: United States
- State: Pennsylvania
- County: Tioga
- Township: Bloss

Area
  - Total: 1.04 sq mi (2.69 km^{2})
  - Land: 1.03 sq mi (2.66 km^{2})
  - Water: 0.012 sq mi (0.03 km^{2})
- Elevation: 1,676 ft (511 m)

Population (2020)
  - Total: 315
  - Density: 306.9/sq mi (118.49/km^{2})
- Time zone: UTC-5 (Eastern (EST))
  - Summer (DST): UTC-4 (EDT)
- ZIP code: 16912
- Area codes: 272 and 570
- FIPS code: 42-03104
- GNIS feature ID: 2634204

Arnot is a census-designated place located in Bloss Township, Tioga County in the state of Pennsylvania, United States. It is located off US Route 15 near the borough of Blossburg. As of the 2020 census, Arnot had a population of 315.

== Demographics ==
Historical population
Census	Pop.	Note	%±
2020	315		—
U.S. Decennial Census

== Education ==
It is in the Southern Tioga School District.

== Notable people ==
Entertainer Johnny J. Jones and professional baseball player Red Murray were born here. Additionally, the first United States Secretary of Labor, William B. Wilson lived here as a child.
