= Sullivan Township, Pennsylvania =

Township in Pennsylvania, US

Coordinates: 41°44′30″N 77°00′59″W

- Township
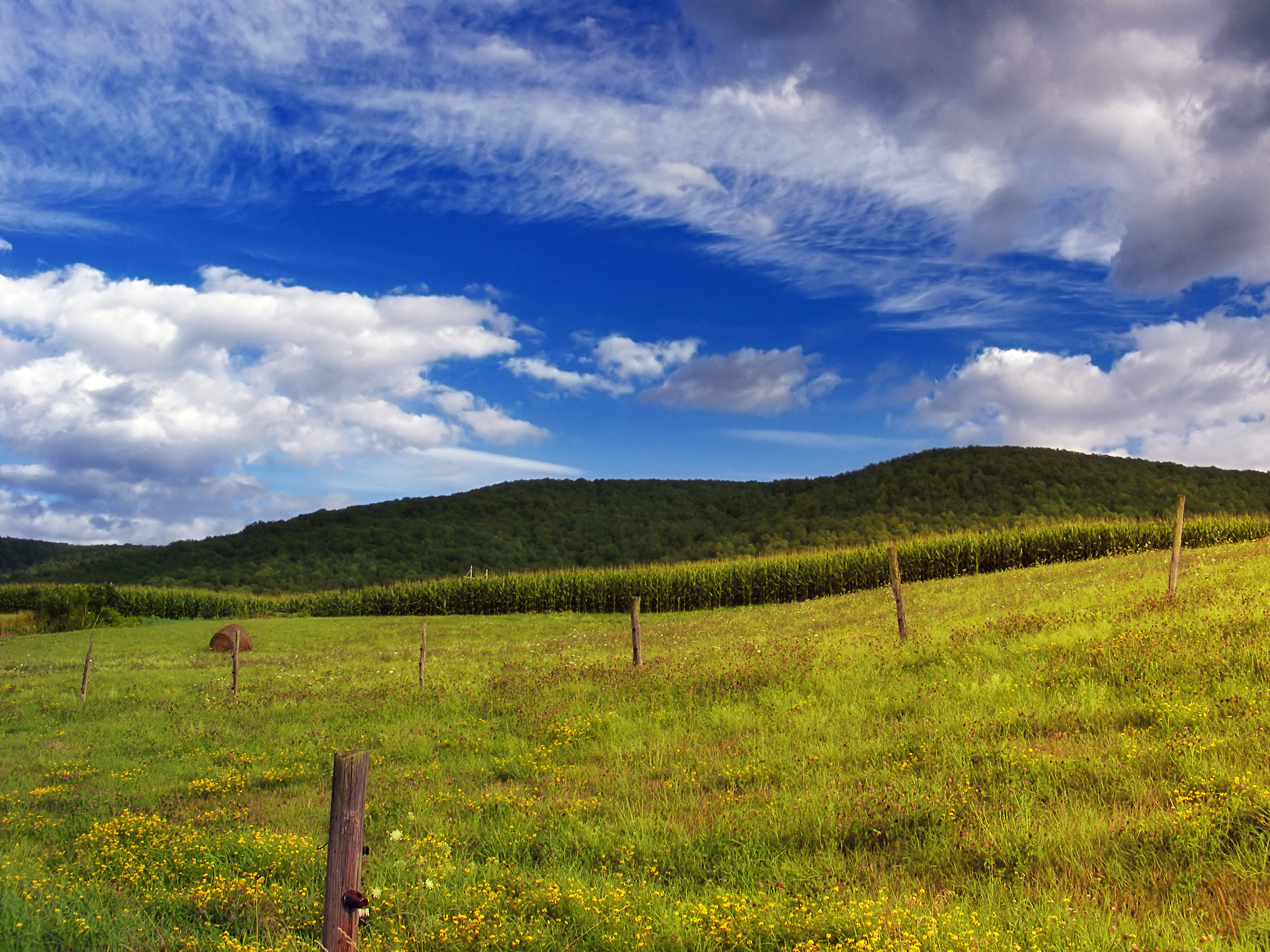
- Cornfield, pasture and hayfield in Sullivan Township

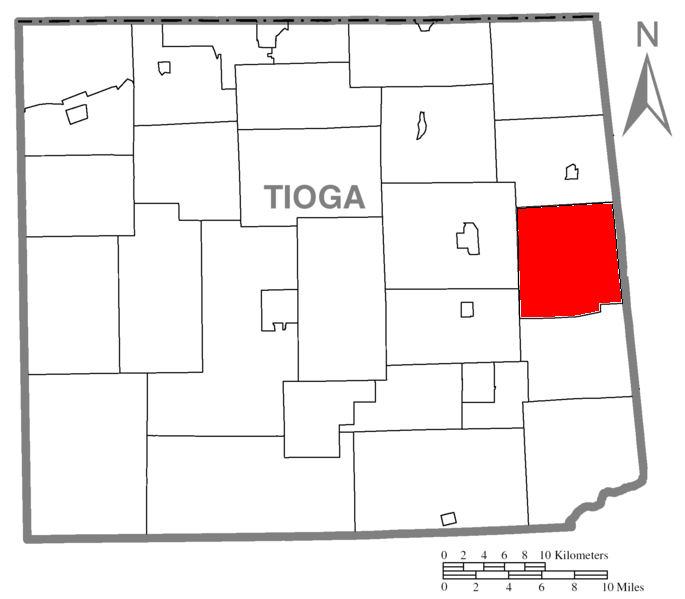
- Map of Tioga County Highlighting Sullivan Township

- Map of Pennsylvania highlighting Tioga County
- Country: United States
- State: Pennsylvania
- County: Tioga
- Settled: 1806
- Incorporated: 1816

Area
  - Total: 42.70 sq mi (110.58 km^{2})
  - Land: 42.59 sq mi (110.31 km^{2})
  - Water: 0.10 sq mi (0.27 km^{2})

Population (2020)
  - Total: 1,470 ▲
  - Estimate (2023): 1,451
  - Density: 34.8/sq mi (13.42/km^{2})
- Time zone: Eastern Time Zone (North America)
  - Summer (DST): EDT
- FIPS code: 42-117-75104
- Website: https://sullivantwp.com/

Historical population
Census	Pop.	Note	%±
2000	1,322		—
2010	1,453		9.9%
2020	1,470		1.2%
2023 (est.)	1,451		−1.3%
U.S. Decennial Census

Sullivan Township is a township in Tioga County, Pennsylvania, United States. The population was 1,470 at the 2020 census.

== Geography ==
According to the United States Census Bureau, the township has a total area of 42.3 square miles (109.6 km^{2}), of which 42.2 square miles (109.3 km^{2}) is land and 0.1 square mile (0.3 km^{2}) (0.26%) is water.

Sullivan Township is bordered by Rutland Township to the north, Bradford County to the east, Ward Township to the south and Covington and Richmond Townships to the west.

== Demographics ==
As of the census of 2000, there were 1,322 people, 487 households, and 392 families residing in the township. The population density was 31.3 inhabitants per square mile (12.1/km^{2}). There were 587 housing units at an average density of 13.9/sq mi (5.4/km^{2}). The racial makeup of the township was 97.81% White, 0.23% African American, 0.76% Native American, 0.30% Asian, and 0.91% from two or more races. Hispanic or Latino of any race were 0.38% of the population.

There were 487 households, out of which 33.7% had children under the age of 18 living with them, 70.2% were married couples living together, 7.4% had a female householder with no husband present, and 19.5% were non-families. 14.8% of all households were made up of individuals, and 4.9% had someone living alone who was 65 years of age or older. The average household size was 2.67 and the average family size was 2.91.

In the township the population was spread out, with 25.4% under the age of 18, 6.5% from 18 to 24, 28.7% from 25 to 44, 27.2% from 45 to 64, and 12.3% who were 65 years of age or older. The median age was 39 years. For every 100 females, there were 101.2 males. For every 100 females age 18 and over, there were 98.4 males.

The median income for a household in the township was $36,350, and the median income for a family was $38,500. Males had a median income of $26,780 versus $19,868 for females. The per capita income for the township was $14,986. About 8.7% of families and 12.2% of the population were below the poverty line, including 20.5% of those under age 18 and 10.0% of those age 65 or over.

== Community ==
- Mainesburg – A village located on U.S. Route 6 in the western part of the township.
