= Hans Christian Adamson =

American writer

- Born: July 20, 1890; Varde, Denmark
- Died: September 11, 1968 (aged 78); San Francisco, California, U.S.
- Resting place: Arlington National Cemetery
- Occupation(s): journalist and author

Hans Christian Adamson (July 20, 1890 – September 11, 1968) was a Danish-born American writer, who, along with Eddie Rickenbacker, survived adrift for 24 days in the Pacific Ocean in 1942.

== Personal history ==
Adamson was born in Varde, Denmark. He served in the United States Army Air Forces during World War II and was released from active duty on December 16, 1945. Adamson received two awards of the Legion of Merit for his military service, one for his work at U.S. Army Air Corps Headquarters, and another for his service promoting the Army's High School Victory Corps program, delivering as many as seven 45-minute talks a day before audiences of High School students and civic organizations. He did this after having suffered a heart attack in 1943.

== Adrift at sea ==
In October 1942, Eddie Rickenbacker was sent on a tour of air bases in the Pacific Theater of Operations. After visiting several air and sea bases in Hawaii, Rickenbacker was provided an older B-17D Flying Fortress (s/n 40-3089) as transportation to the South Pacific. The bomber strayed hundreds of miles off course while on its way to a refueling stop on Canton Island and was forced to ditch in a remote and little-traveled part of the Central Pacific Ocean.

For 24 days, Rickenbacker, his friend and business partner Hans Christian Adamson (then an Army Captain), and the rest of the crewmen drifted in life rafts at sea. Rickenbacker was still suffering somewhat from his earlier airplane crash, and Capt. Adamson sustained serious injuries during the ditching. The other crewmen in the B-17 were hurt to varying degrees. The crewmen's food supply ran out after three days. They lived on sporadic rain water and food such as seagulls.

A US Navy patrol OS2U-3 Kingfisher float-plane spotted and rescued the survivors on November 13, off the coast of Nukufetau in Tuvalu. All were suffering from hyperthermia, sunburn, dehydration, and near-starvation.

== Writing ==
Before and after retiring from the US Air Force as a full colonel, Adamson wrote a number of books and radio drama scripts. In order of original publication, they include:

- Carnochan, Frederic Grosvenor; Adamson, Hans Christian (1935). The Empire of the Snakes. Hutchinson. OCLC 2640440.
- Carnochan, Frederic Grosvenor; Adamson, Hans Christian (2011) [orig. 1935]. Out of Africa. Literary Licensing, LLC. ISBN 978-1258109912.
- Adamson, Hans Christian (2013) [orig. 1946]. Eddie Rickenbacker. Literary Licensing, LLC. ISBN 978-1258803469.
- Lockwood, Charles A.; Adamson, Hans Christian (1955). Hellcats of the Sea. New York: Greenberg. OCLC 2364890., a non-fiction work later fictionalized and filmed as Hellcats of the Navy in 1957.
- Adamson, Hans Christian (2011) [orig. 1958]. Admiral Thunderbolt: The Spectacular Career Of Peter Wessel, Norway's Greatest Sea Hero. Chilton Company. ISBN 978-1258060367.
- Lockwood, Charles A.; Adamson, Hans Christian (1997) [orig. 1960]. Tragedy at Honda. Valley Pioneer Publishers. ISBN 978-0965552721.
- Adamson, Hans Christian (2012) [orig. 1961]. Rebellion in Missouri, 1861: Nathaniel Lyon and His Army of the West. Literary Licensing, LLC. ISBN 978-1258510084.
- Adamson, Hans Christian; Klem, Per (1964). Blood on the Midnight Sun. Norton. OCLC 1074041.
- Adamson, Hans Christian; Kosco, George F. (1967). Halsey's Typhoons. Crown Publishers. OCLC 1074067.
- Adamson, Hans Christian (2011). Keepers of the Lights. Aristophanes Press. ISBN 978-1447411963.
