= Hamilton Township, Tioga County, Pennsylvania =

Township in Pennsylvania, US

Coordinates: 41°39′00″N 77°02′59″W

- Township
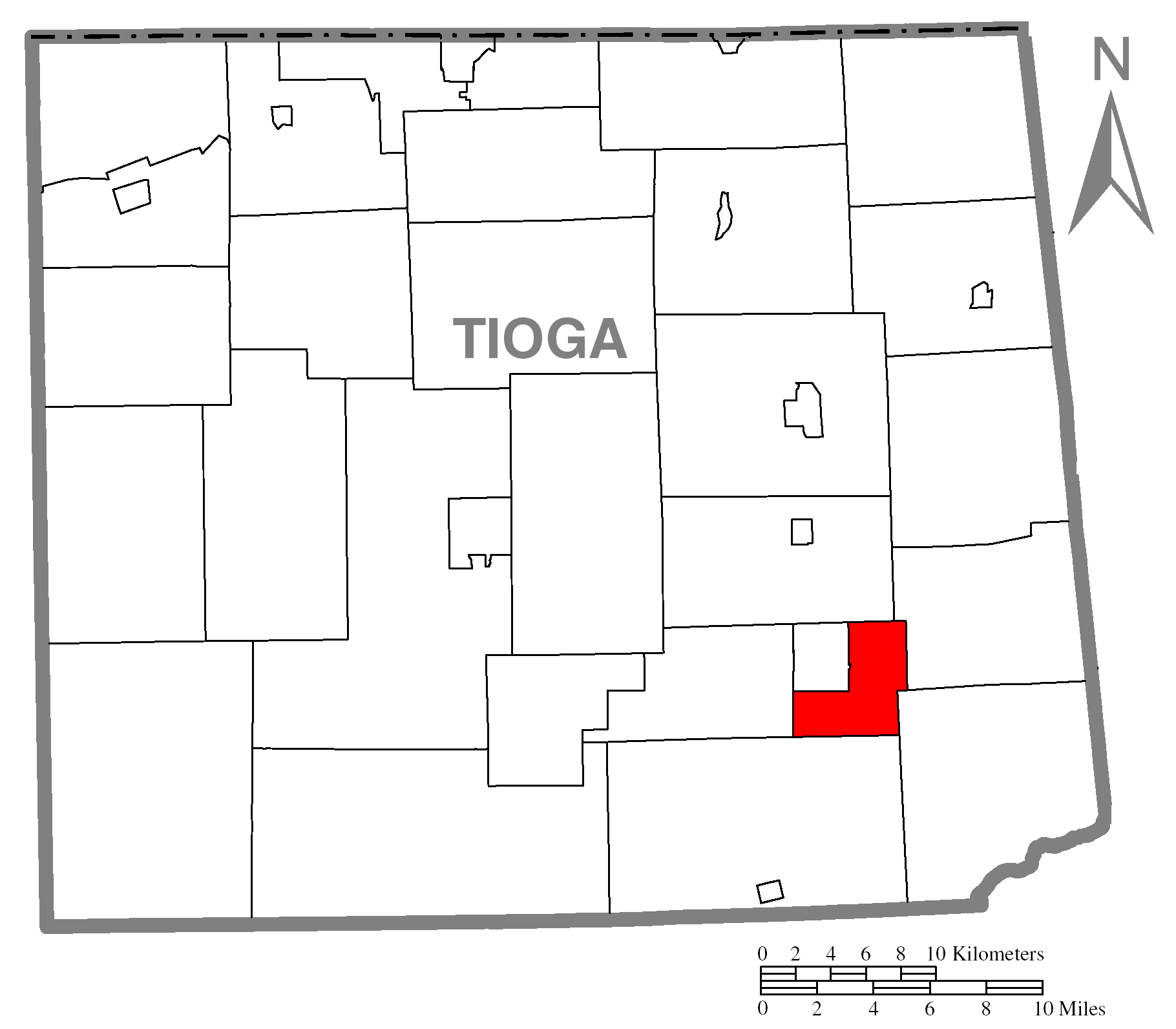
- Map of Tioga County Highlighting Hamilton Township

- Map of Pennsylvania highlighting Tioga County
- Country: United States
- State: Pennsylvania
- County: Tioga
- Settled: 1806
- Incorporated: 1872

Area
  - Total: 10.86 sq mi (28.13 km^{2})
  - Land: 10.85 sq mi (28.10 km^{2})
  - Water: 0.012 sq mi (0.03 km^{2})

Population (2020)
  - Total: 534 ▲
  - Estimate (2023): 530
  - Density: 46.0/sq mi (17.76/km^{2})
- Time zone: Eastern Time Zone (North America)
  - Summer (DST): EDT
- FIPS code: 42-117-32192

Historical population
Census	Pop.	Note	%±
2000	462		—
2010	499		8.0%
2020	534		7.0%
2023 (est.)	530		−0.7%
U.S. Decennial Census

Hamilton Township is a township in Tioga County, Pennsylvania, United States. The population was 534 at the 2020 census.

== Geography ==
According to the United States Census Bureau, the township has a total area of 11.0 square miles (28 km^{2}), of which 11.0 square miles (28 km^{2}) is land and 0.09% is water.

Hamilton Township forms the eastern and southern borders of Blossburg. It is bordered by Covington Township to the north, Ward Township to the north and east, Union Township to the south and east, Liberty Township to the south and Bloss Township to the west.

== Demographics ==
As of the census of 2000, there were 462 people, 176 households, and 124 families residing in the township. The population density was 42.0 inhabitants per square mile (16.2/km^{2}). There were 219 housing units at an average density of 19.9/sq mi (7.7/km^{2}). The racial makeup of the township was 98.92% White, 0.43% Native American, 0.22% Asian, 0.22% Pacific Islander, and 0.22% from two or more races. Hispanic or Latino of any race were 0.22% of the population.

There were 176 households, out of which 31.3% had children under the age of 18 living with them, 55.7% were married couples living together, 10.2% had a female householder with no husband present, and 29.5% were non-families. 23.9% of all households were made up of individuals, and 13.6% had someone living alone who was 65 years of age or older. The average household size was 2.55 and the average family size was 3.02.

In the township the population was spread out, with 25.3% under the age of 18, 7.8% from 18 to 24, 26.4% from 25 to 44, 21.9% from 45 to 64, and 18.6% who were 65 years of age or older. The median age was 38 years. For every 100 females, there were 98.3 males. For every 100 females age 18 and over, there were 101.8 males.

The median income for a household in the township was $26,563, and the median income for a family was $33,750. Males had a median income of $24,583 versus $18,750 for females. The per capita income for the township was $13,251. About 6.2% of families and 10.7% of the population were below the poverty line, including 5.3% of those under age 18 and 12.6% of those age 65 or over.

== Communities and locations ==
- Blossburg – A borough on U.S. Route 15. It borders Hamilton Township to the north and west.
- Morris Run – A village near the eastern township line. It is a few miles east of Blossburg.
- Tioga State Forest – A small portion of the Tioga State Forest juts northward into Hamilton Township.
