= Fall Brook, Pennsylvania =

Ghost town in Pennsylvania, U.S.

Coordinates: 41°40′38″N 76°59′09″W

Fall Brook is a ghost town in Ward Township, Tioga County, Pennsylvania, United States. The town has been deserted since around 1900.

In 1860, the Fallbrook Coal Company founded the town on the Fall Brook Creek. John Magee and his son Duncan had discovered some coal along the banks of the Fall Brook Creek. The Magees also constructed a railroad to connect Fall Brook with Corning, New York, where the coal was transported up to the Erie Canal. By 1862, Fall Brook had a population of about 1400 people.

Eventually the coal ran out, and by 1900 the town ceased to exist.

The town of Fallbrook, California, is named after this town.
