= Ward Township, Pennsylvania =

Township in Pennsylvania, US

Coordinates: 41°42′30″N 77°00′59″W

- Township
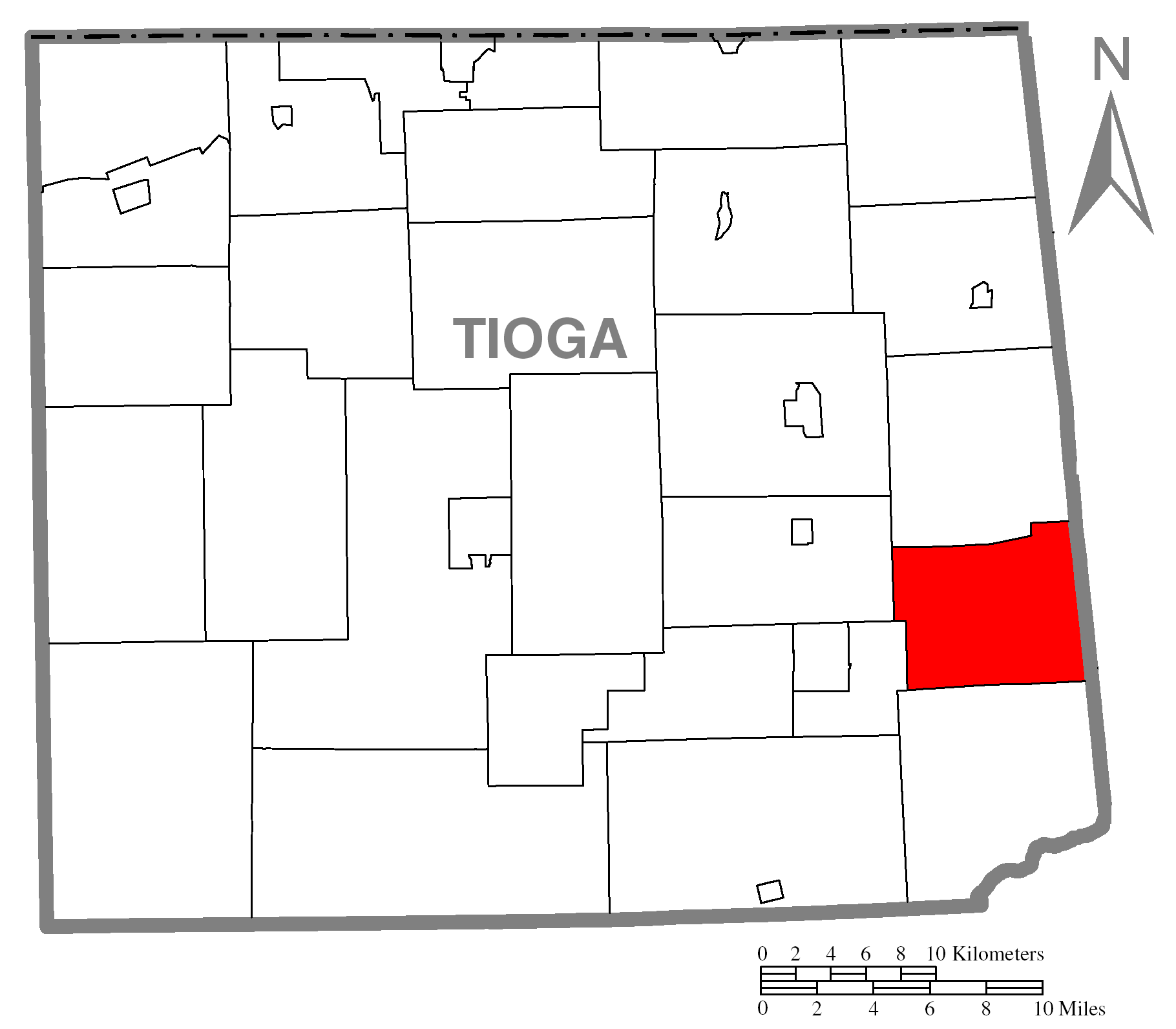
- Map of Tioga County Highlighting Ward Township

- Map of Pennsylvania highlighting Tioga County
- Country: United States
- State: Pennsylvania
- County: Tioga
- Settled: 1837
- Incorporated: 1852

Area
  - Total: 34.00 sq mi (88.07 km^{2})
  - Land: 34.00 sq mi (88.06 km^{2})
  - Water: 0.0039 sq mi (0.01 km^{2})

Population (2020)
  - Total: 226 ▲
  - Estimate (2023): 222
  - Density: 5.2/sq mi (2.02/km^{2})
- Time zone: Eastern Time Zone (North America)
  - Summer (DST): EDT
- FIPS code: 42-117-80936
- Website: https://wardtwp.com/

Historical population
Census	Pop.	Note	%±
2000	128		—
2010	166		29.7%
2020	226		36.1%
2023 (est.)	222		−1.8%
U.S. Decennial Census

Ward Township is a township in Tioga County, Pennsylvania, United States. The population was 222 at the 2020 census.

== Geography ==
According to the United States Census Bureau, the township has a total area of 34.2 square miles (88.6 km^{2}), of which 34.2 square miles (88.6 km^{2}) is land and 0.03% is water.

Ward Township is bordered by Sullivan Township to the north, Bradford County to the east, Union Township, to the south and Hamilton and Covington Townships to the west.

== Demographics ==
As of the census of 2000, there were 128 people, 60 households, and 36 families residing in the township. The population density was 3.7 people per square mile (1.4/km^{2}). There were 220 housing units at an average density of 6.4/sq mi (2.5/km^{2}). The racial makeup of the township was 100.00% White.

There were 60 households, out of which 16.7% had children under the age of 18 living with them, 55.0% were married couples living together, and 40.0% were non-families. 33.3% of all households were made up of individuals, and 16.7% had someone living alone who was 65 years of age or older. The average household size was 2.13 and the average family size was 2.61.

In the township the population was spread out, with 18.8% under the age of 18, 2.3% from 18 to 24, 25.0% from 25 to 44, 32.0% from 45 to 64, and 21.9% who were 65 years of age or older. The median age was 48 years. For every 100 females, there were 106.5 males. For every 100 females age 18 and over, there were 121.3 males.

The median income for a household in the township was $27,500, and the median income for a family was $36,750. Males had a median income of $29,643 versus $18,958 for females. The per capita income for the township was $15,553. There were 12.2% of families and 15.6% of the population living below the poverty line, including no under eighteens and 33.3% of those over 64.

== Communities and locations ==
- Fall Brook – A ghost town within the Tioga State Forest in the southwest part of the township.
- Tioga State Forest – Much of Ward Township's area is the Tioga State Forest.
