= Red Murray =

American baseball player (1884–1958)

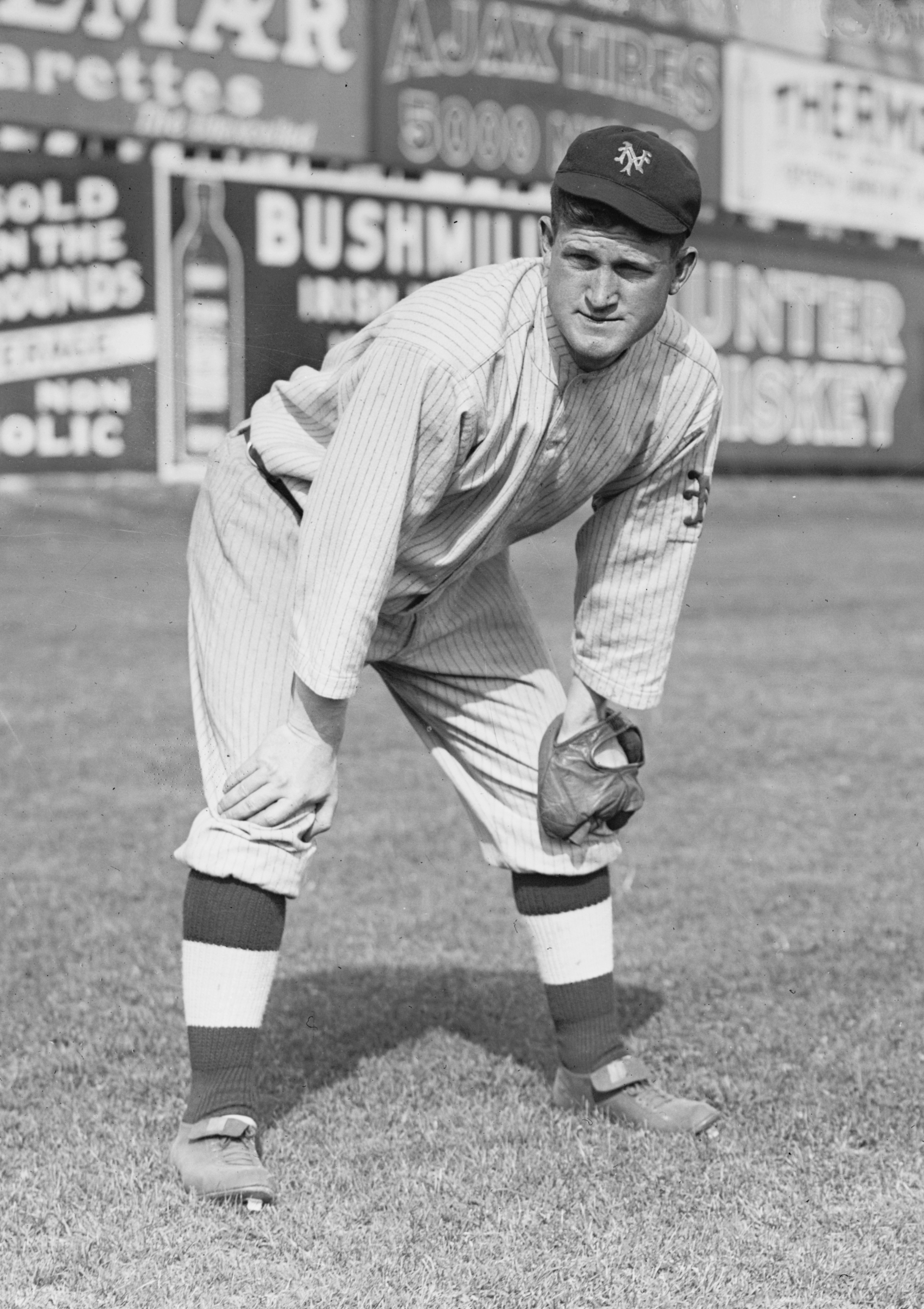
- Outfielder
- Born: March 4, 1884; Arnot, Pennsylvania, U.S.
- Died: December 4, 1958 (aged 74); Sayre, Pennsylvania, U.S.
- Batted: Right Threw: Right

MLB debut
- June 16, 1906, for the St. Louis Cardinals

Last MLB appearance
- October 3, 1916, for the New York Giants

MLB statistics
- Batting average: .270
- Home runs: 37
- Runs batted in: 579
- Stats at Baseball Reference

Teams
- St. Louis Cardinals (1906–1908); New York Giants (1909–1915); Chicago Cubs (1915); New York Giants (1917)

Career highlights and awards
- NL home run leader (1909)

John Joseph "Red" Murray (March 4, 1884 – December 4, 1958) was an American outfielder in Major League Baseball.

== Career ==
Murray was born in Arnot, Pennsylvania. In 1902, he attended Lock Haven College, where he played football, basketball, and baseball. In 1904, Murray changed schools to the University of Notre Dame, playing as a catcher for the Fighting Irish. In 1906, he was signed by the St. Louis Cardinals, and the next year he played at right field and hit seven home runs. During the season, Murray hit a 471-foot (144 m) home run. In 1908, he played in all 154 games and finished second in the National League in stolen bases (48), and third both in hits (167) and home runs (7).

Murray was traded to the New York Giants and helped win John McGraw three consecutive pennants. From 1909 to 1912, he ranked third in the league in runs batted in, trailing only Honus Wagner and Sherry Magee. Murray and Wagner tied for the most home runs in the majors from 1907 through 1909 (21).

According to popular myth, Murray is remembered for being struck by lightning in a 1914 game. Murray, playing in the outfield for the New York Giants, caught a fly ball which would prove to be the final out of a 21 inning game on July 17, 1914. Immediately after catching the ball Murray was struck by lightning and rendered unconscious, however, he managed to hold on to the ball, ending the game. According to the baseball almanac, Murray was not playing an outfield position during that game. This myth may have been an exaggeration of a prior incident. "According to multiple accounts, Murray preserved a 2-2 tie for the Giants during a torrential downpour on August 16, 1909. With two on and two out in the eighth and mound master Christy Mathewson on the hill, Pirates second baseman Dots Miller sent a hard smash into the angry skies. Murray sprinted after the ball and made a spectacular bare-handed grab as a bolt of lightning illuminated the field - rendering the catch all the more dramatic to witness." Murray last played in the majors in 1917.

J.C. Kofoed, in the April 1924 issue of Baseball Magazine wrote:

"Red Murray was for years noted as one of the greatest outfielders in the National League. His throwing arm was the best ever, his ground covering ability and sureness of eye were classic. Furthermore, he was remarkably fast as a base runner, and noted as a batter as well. In his seven seasons as a regular, Murray led NL outfielders in home runs, runs batted in, stolen bases, and assists a total of 16 times. Despite his impressive statistics in power hitting, baserunning, and fielding, he remains one of the least-recognized stars of the Deadball Era."

Murray died on December 4, 1958, of acute leukemia at the age of 74 in a hospital near Sayre, Pennsylvania. His obituary ranked him "with Mel Ott as one of the two greatest right fielders in New York Giant history."

== See also ==
- List of Major League Baseball annual home run leaders
