= Bloss Township, Pennsylvania =

Township in Pennsylvania, US

Coordinates: 41°40′00″N 77°06′59″W

- Township
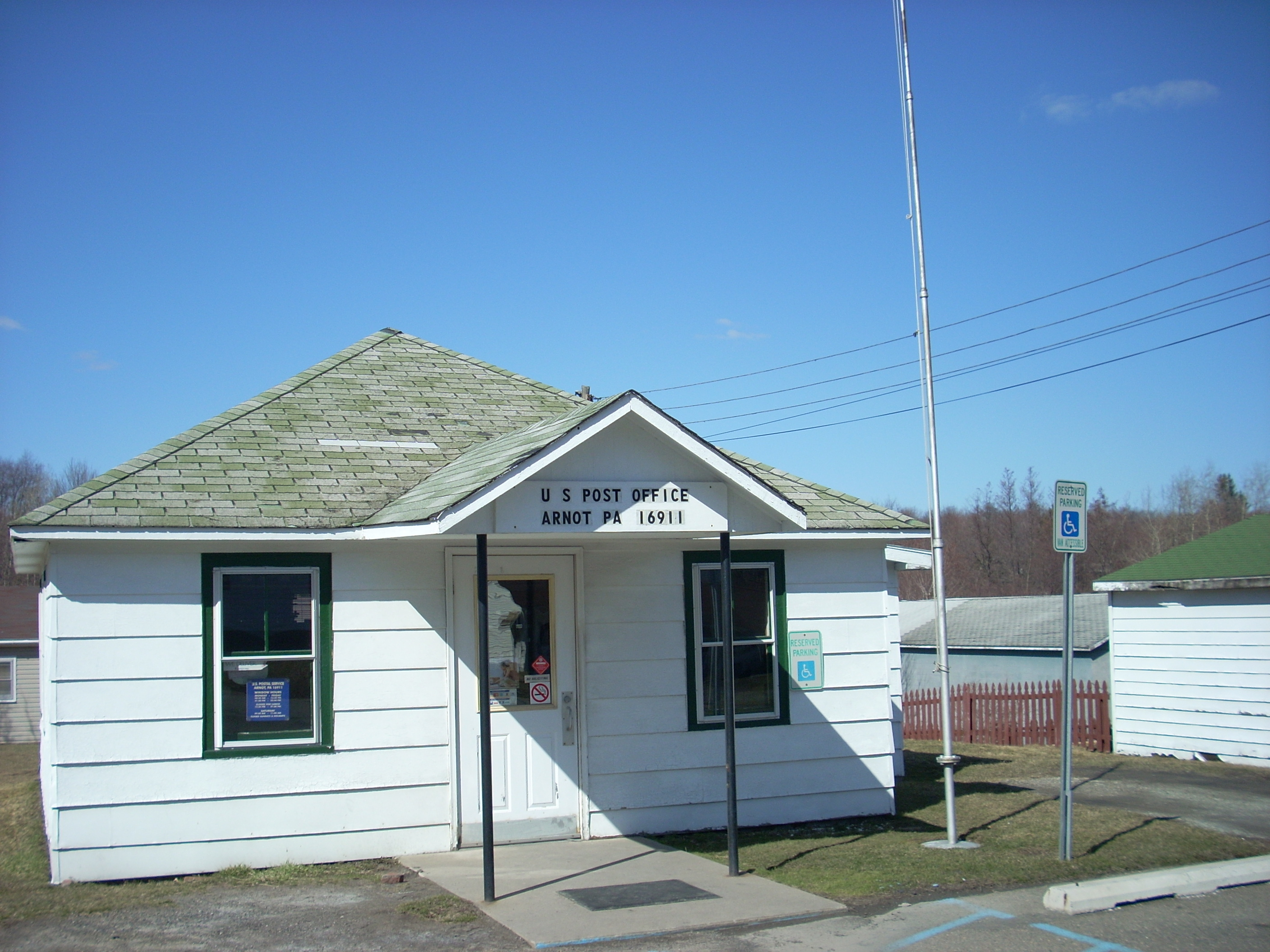
- The Arnot Post Office in Bloss Township

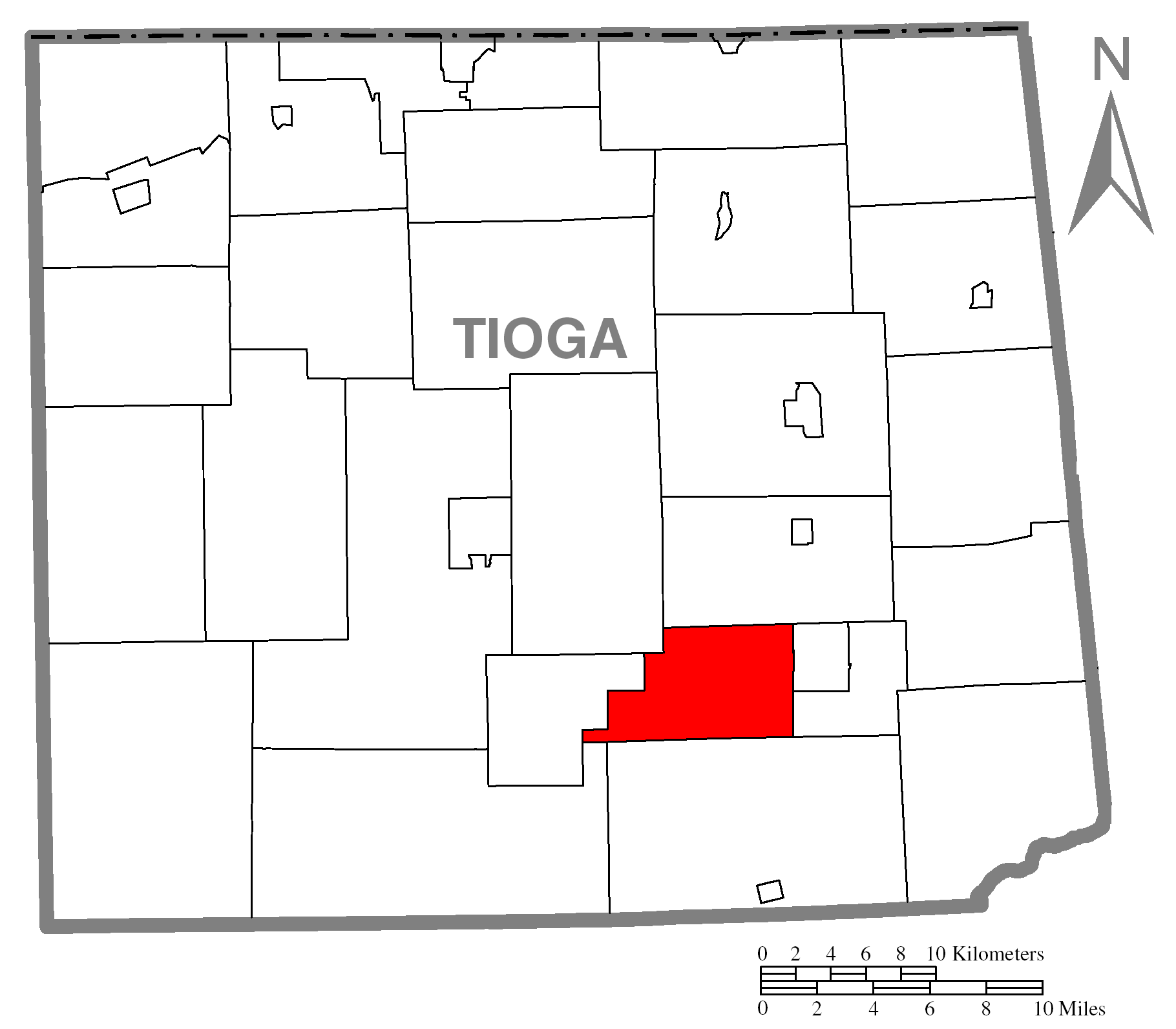
- Map of Tioga County Highlighting Bloss Township

- Map of Pennsylvania highlighting Tioga County
- Country: United States
- State: Pennsylvania
- County: Tioga
- Settled: 1806
- Incorporated: 1841

Area
  - Total: 24.10 sq mi (62.42 km^{2})
  - Land: 24.02 sq mi (62.20 km^{2})
  - Water: 0.089 sq mi (0.23 km^{2})

Population (2020)
  - Total: 343 ▼
  - Estimate (2023): 357
  - Density: 14.2/sq mi (5.47/km^{2})
- Time zone: Eastern Time Zone (North America)
  - Summer (DST): EDT
- FIPS code: 42-117-07152

Historical population
Census	Pop.	Note	%±
2000	354		—
2010	353		−0.3%
2020	343		−2.8%
2023 (est.)	357		4.1%
U.S. Decennial Census

Bloss Township is a township in Tioga County, Pennsylvania, United States. The population was 343 at the 2020 census.

== Geography ==
According to the United States Census Bureau, the township has a total area of 23.2 square miles (60 km^{2}), of which 23.1 square miles (60 km^{2}) is land and 0.1 square miles (0.26 km^{2}) (0.43%) is water.

Bloss Township is bordered by Covington Township to the north, Blossburg and Hamilton Township to the east, Liberty Township to the south, Duncan Township to the west, and Charleston Township to the northwest.

== Demographics ==
As of the census of 2000, there were 354 people, 138 households, and 105 families residing in the township. The population density was 15.3 people per square mile (5.9/km^{2}). There were 195 housing units at an average density of 8.4/sq mi (3.3/km^{2}). The racial makeup of the township was 100.00% White.

There were 138 households, out of which 32.6% had children under the age of 18 living with them, 60.1% were married couples living together, 8.7% had a female householder with no husband present, and 23.2% were non-families. 19.6% of all households were made up of individuals, and 8.7% had someone living alone who was 65 years of age or older. The average household size was 2.57 and the average family size was 2.96.

In the township the population was spread out, with 23.2% under the age of 18, 9.3% from 18 to 24, 26.8% from 25 to 44, 25.1% from 45 to 64, and 15.5% who were 65 years of age or older. The median age was 39 years. For every 100 females, there were 94.5 males. For every 100 females age 18 and over, there were 100.0 males.

The median income for a household in the township was $28,571, and the median income for a family was $35,208. Males had a median income of $33,125 versus $20,417 for females. The per capita income for the township was $13,857. About 8.8% of families and 9.0% of the population were below the poverty line, including 9.6% of those under age 18 and 12.3% of those age 65 or over.

== Communities and locations ==
- Arnot – A village and census-designated place within the Tioga State Forest in the central part of the township, a few miles southwest of Blossburg.
- Maple Hill – A village in the northwestern corner of the township.
- Tioga State Forest – The Tioga State Forest covers most of Bloss Township.
