= Union Township, Tioga County, Pennsylvania =

Township in Pennsylvania, US

Coordinates: 41°35′00″N 77°00′29″W

- Township
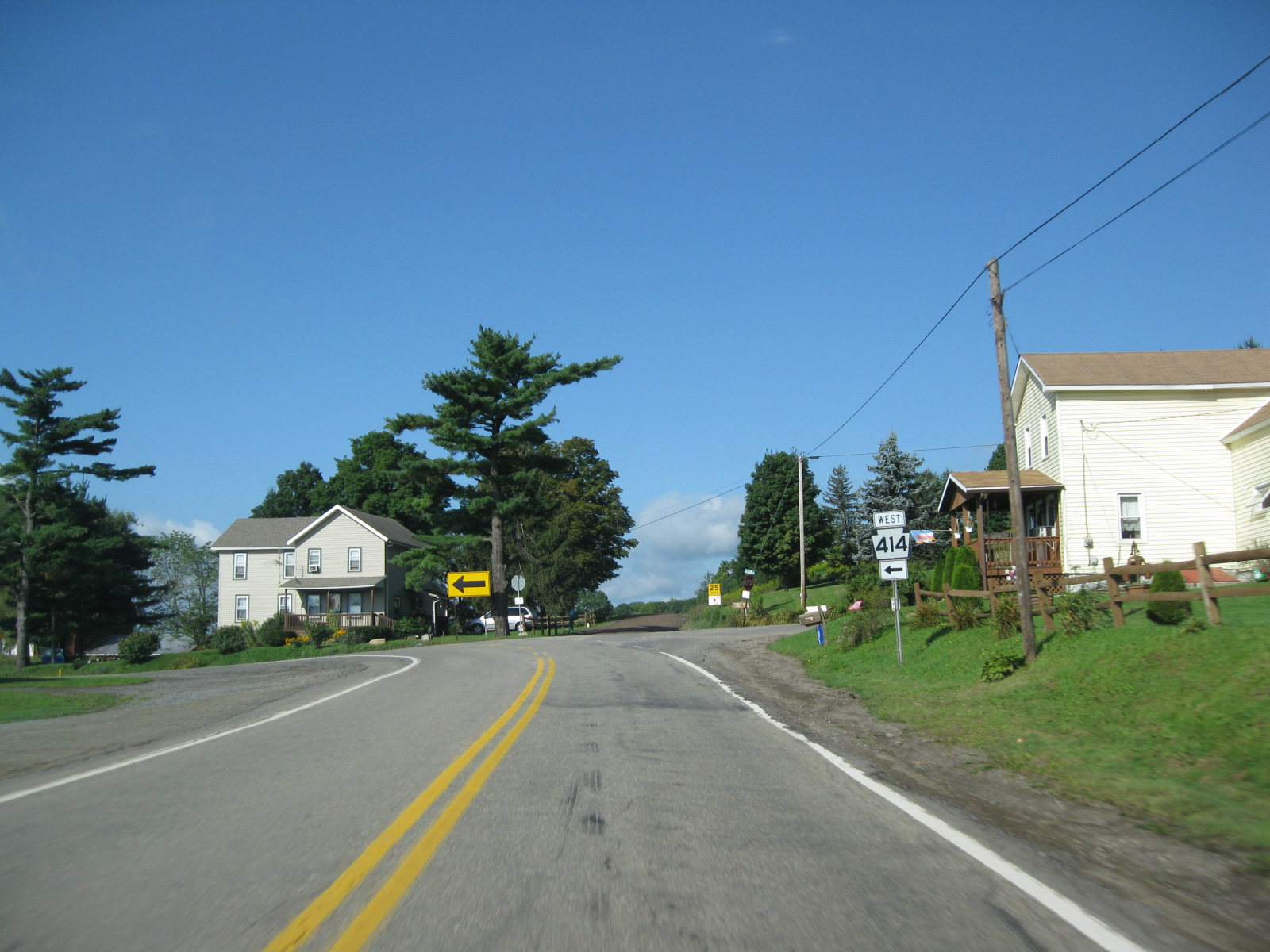
- PA 414 westbound in the village of Gleason

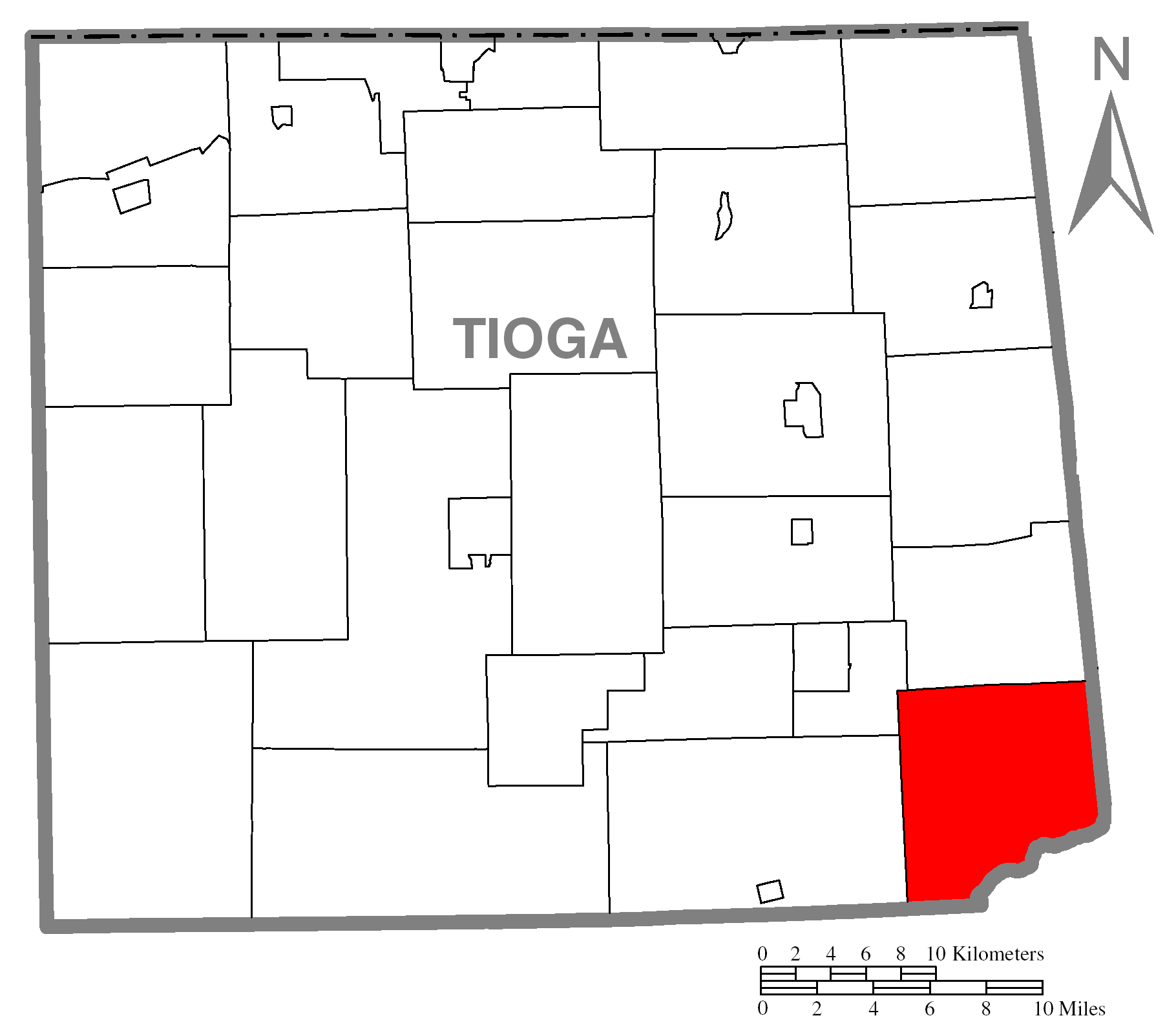
- Map of Tioga County Highlighting Union Township

- Map of Pennsylvania highlighting Tioga County
- Country: United States
- State: Pennsylvania
- County: Tioga
- Settled: 1803
- Incorporated: 1830

Area
  - Total: 47.71 sq mi (123.56 km^{2})
  - Land: 47.69 sq mi (123.52 km^{2})
  - Water: 0.012 sq mi (0.03 km^{2})

Population (2020)
  - Total: 948 ▼
  - Estimate (2023): 946
  - Density: 21.0/sq mi (8.09/km^{2})
- Time zone: Eastern Time Zone (North America)
  - Summer (DST): EDT
- FIPS code: 42-117-78416

Historical population
Census	Pop.	Note	%±
2000	945		—
2010	1,000		5.8%
2020	946		−5.4%
2023 (est.)	946		0.0%
U.S. Decennial Census

Union Township is a township in Tioga County, Pennsylvania, United States. The population was 948 at the 2020 census.

== Geography ==
According to the United States Census Bureau, the township has a total area of 47.3 square miles (122.5 km^{2}), of which 47.3 square miles (122.4 km^{2}) is land and 0.02% is water.

Union Township is bordered by Ward Township to the north, Bradford County to the east, Lycoming County to the south and Liberty and Hamilton Townships to the west.

== Demographics ==
As of the census of 2000, there were 945 people, 343 households, and 282 families residing in the township. The population density was 20.0 people per square mile (7.7/km^{2}). There were 469 housing units at an average density of 9.9/sq mi (3.8/km^{2}). The racial makeup of the township was 99.05% White, 0.11% African American, 0.11% Native American, 0.11% Pacific Islander, and 0.63% from two or more races. Hispanic or Latino of any race were 0.11% of the population.

There were 343 households, out of which 30.3% had children under the age of 18 living with them, 72.9% were married couples living together, 4.1% had a female householder with no husband present, and 17.5% were non-families. 14.3% of all households were made up of individuals, and 5.8% had someone living alone who was 65 years of age or older. The average household size was 2.76 and the average family size was 3.00.

In the township the population was spread out, with 24.7% under the age of 18, 7.1% from 18 to 24, 28.7% from 25 to 44, 24.6% from 45 to 64, and 15.0% who were 65 years of age or older. The median age was 39 years. For every 100 females, there were 108.1 males. For every 100 females age 18 and over, there were 108.8 males.

The median income for a household in the township was $36,094, and the median income for a family was $37,330. Males had a median income of $28,750 versus $21,691 for females. The per capita income for the township was $16,309. About 2.8% of families and 5.9% of the population were below the poverty line, including 8.1% of those under age 18 and 1.4% of those age 65 or over.

== Communities and locations ==
- Dogtown – A village on the southeastern border of Union Township. It is located on Pennsylvania Route 14.
- Gleason – A village on Pennsylvania Route 414 in the northern part of the township.
- Lycoming Creek – A creek that forms the southeastern border of the township with Lycoming County.
- Newelltown – A village on Pennsylvania Route 14 in the southern part of the township, about a mile northeast of Dogtown.
- Ogdensburg – A village on Pennsylvania Route 414 in the western part of the township.
- Penbryn – A village on Pennsylvania Route 14 in the eastern part of the township. It is located near the triple border of Tioga, Bradford, and Lycoming Counties.
- Roaring Branch – A village on Pennsylvania Route 14 in the southern part of the township, about two miles southwest of Dogtown.
- South Union – A village in southwestern Union Township.
- Spencertown – A village in the eastern part of the township.
- Union Center – A village on Pennsylvania Route 414 in the central part of the township.
