= Rico Suave =

Rico Suave may refer to:

- "Rico Suave" (song), a 1990 single by Gerardo
- Rico Suave (wrestler) (1970–2025), Puerto Rican professional wrestler
- Rico Suave (character), Hannah Montana series character
- Rico Suave, a 2022 album by Ricky Rich
