= Richmond Furnace, Pennsylvania =

Unincorporated community in Pennsylvania, U.S.

Coordinates: 39°57′47″N 77°54′02″W

Richmond Furnace is an unincorporated community in Franklin County, in the U.S. state of Pennsylvania.

== History ==
A post office called Richmond Furnace was established in 1872, and remained in operation until 1965. The community was named after Richmond L. Jones, proprietor of a local blast furnace.
