= Liberty Township, Tioga County, Pennsylvania =

Township in Pennsylvania, US

Coordinates: 41°35′00″N 77°04′59″W

- Township
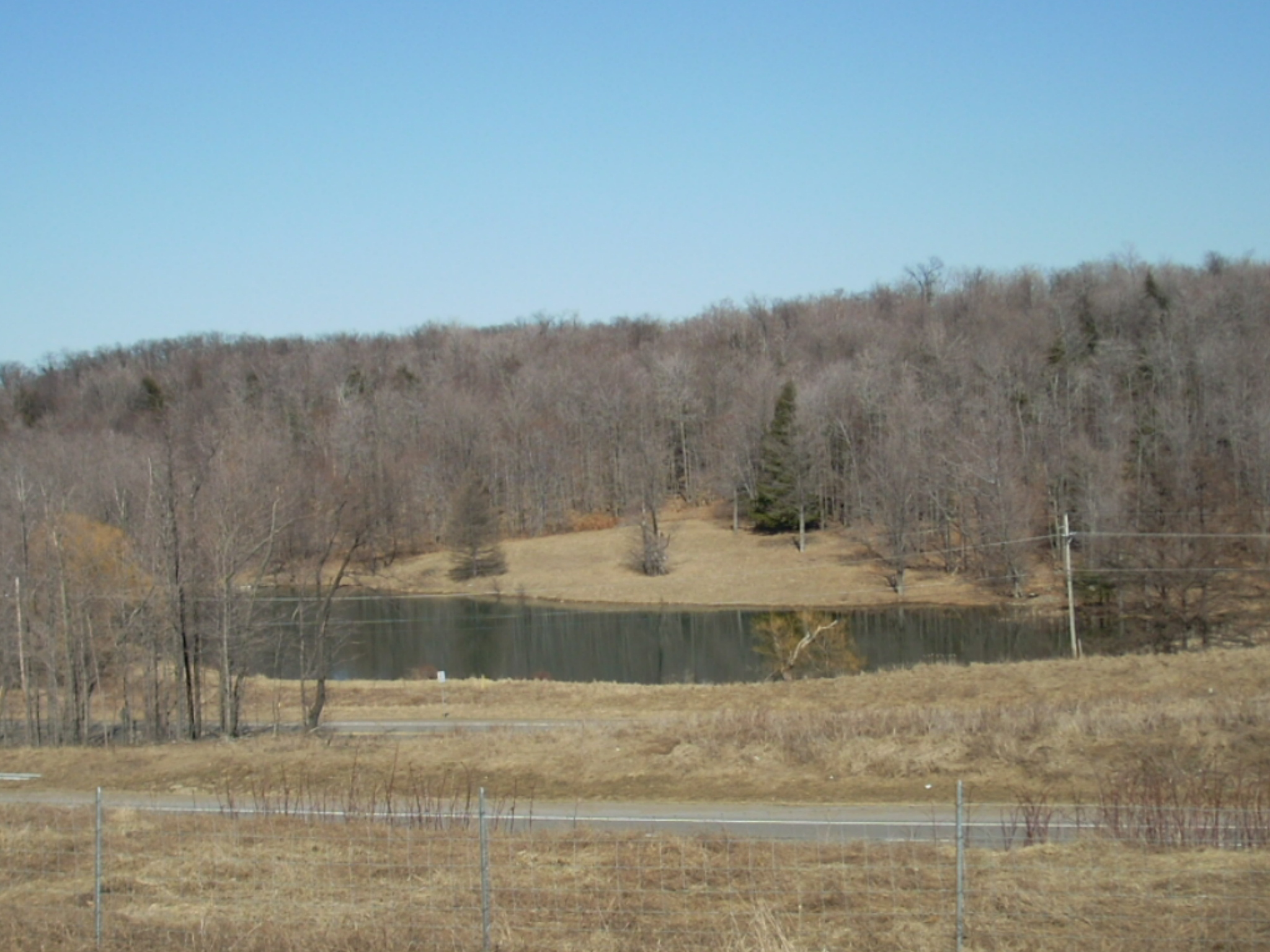
- A pond near the summit of Bloss Mountain in Liberty Township

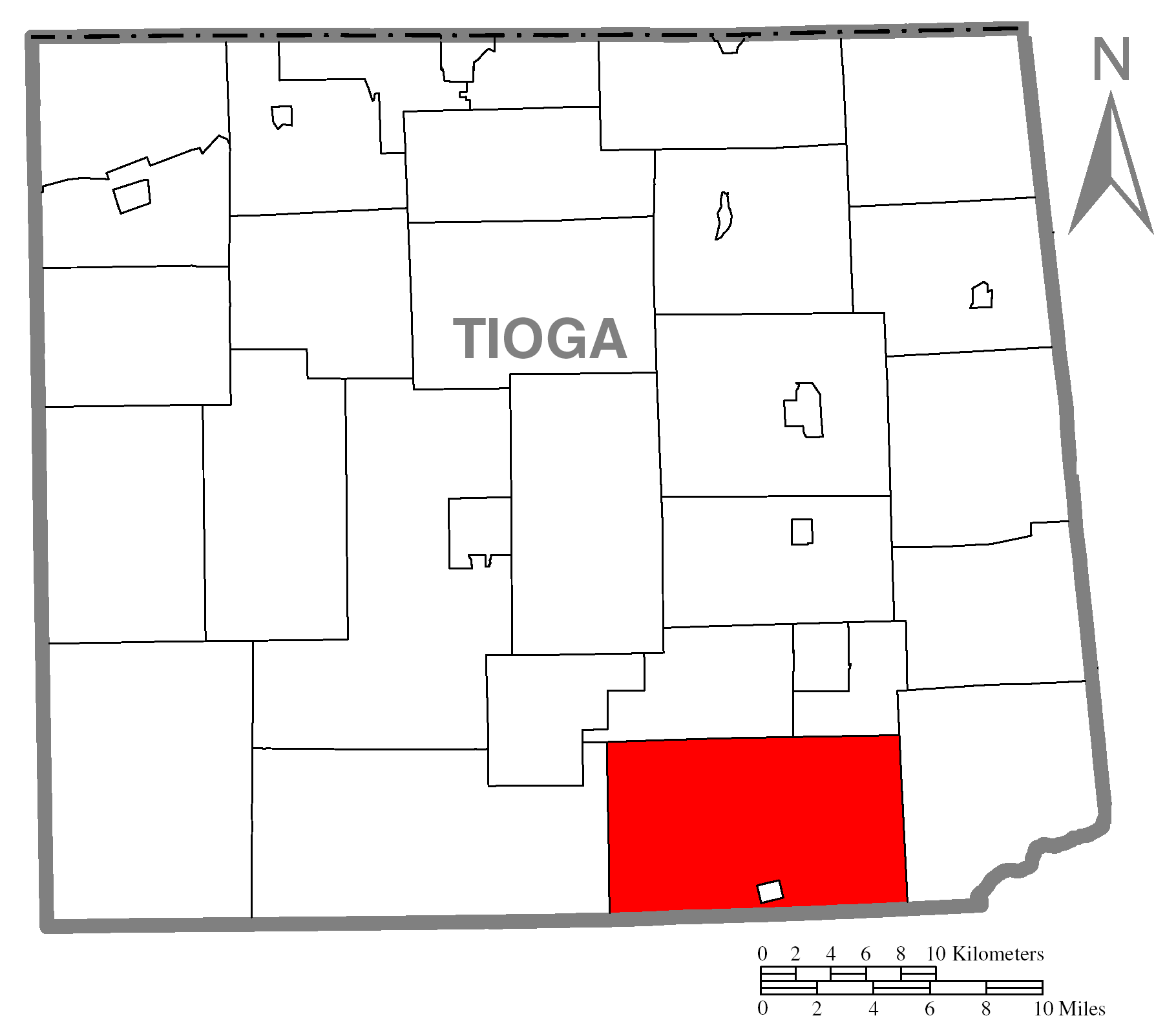
- Map of Tioga County Highlighting Liberty Township

- Map of Pennsylvania highlighting Tioga County
- Country: United States
- State: Pennsylvania
- County: Tioga
- Settled: 1792
- Incorporated: 1823

Area
  - Total: 63.32 sq mi (163.99 km^{2})
  - Land: 63.28 sq mi (163.90 km^{2})
  - Water: 0.035 sq mi (0.09 km^{2})

Population (2020)
  - Total: 1,038 ▼
  - Estimate (2023): 1,029
  - Density: 16.2/sq mi (6.26/km^{2})
- Time zone: Eastern Time Zone (North America)
  - Summer (DST): EDT
- FIPS code: 42-117-43136

Historical population
Census	Pop.	Note	%±
2000	868		—
2010	1,042		20.0%
2020	1,038		−0.4%
2023 (est.)	1,029		−0.9%
U.S. Decennial Census

Liberty Township is a township in Tioga County, Pennsylvania, United States. The population was 1,038 at the 2020 census.

== Geography ==
According to the United States Census Bureau, the township has a total area of 65.1 square miles (168.7 km^{2}), of which 65.1 square miles (168.6 km^{2}) is land and 0.1 square mile (0.1 km^{2}) (0.08%) is water.

Liberty Township is bordered by Bloss and Hamilton Townships to the north, Union Township to the east, Lycoming County to the south and Morris Township to the west.

== Demographics ==
As of the census of 2000, there were 868 people, 345 households, and 257 families residing in the township. The population density was 13.3 people per square mile (5.1/km^{2}). There were 474 housing units at an average density of 7.3/sq mi (2.8/km^{2}). The racial makeup of the township was 99.65% White, 0.12% Native American, 0.12% from other races, and 0.12% from two or more races. Hispanic or Latino of any race were 0.12% of the population.

There were 345 households, out of which 30.1% had children under the age of 18 living with them, 67.2% were married couples living together, 3.8% had a female householder with no husband present, and 25.5% were non-families. 20.6% of all households were made up of individuals, and 11.9% had someone living alone who was 65 years of age or older. The average household size was 2.52 and the average family size was 2.95.

In the township the population was spread out, with 22.5% under the age of 18, 7.4% from 18 to 24, 24.8% from 25 to 44, 26.8% from 45 to 64, and 18.5% who were 65 years of age or older. The median age was 43 years. For every 100 females, there were 102.8 males. For every 100 females age 18 and over, there were 105.2 males.

The median income for a household in the township was $36,953, and the median income for a family was $42,500. Males had a median income of $27,063 versus $21,591 for females. The per capita income for the township was $15,857. About 7.5% of families and 9.2% of the population were below the poverty line, including 11.3% of those under age 18 and 13.5% of those age 65 or over.

== Communities and locations ==
- East Point – A village on Pennsylvania Route 414 in the eastern part of the township.
- Hartfield – A village on Pennsylvania Route 414 in the west-central part of the township.
- Liberty – A small borough at the junction of U.S. Route 15 and Pennsylvania Route 414 near the southern township line.
- Nauvoo – A village near the western township line, a few miles southwest of Hartsfield.
- Sebring – A village near U.S. Route 15, approximately three miles north of Liberty.
- Tioga State Forest – The Tioga State Forest covers portions of northern Liberty Township.
