= Roaring Branch, Pennsylvania =

Unincorporated community in Pennsylvania, US

- Unincorporated community
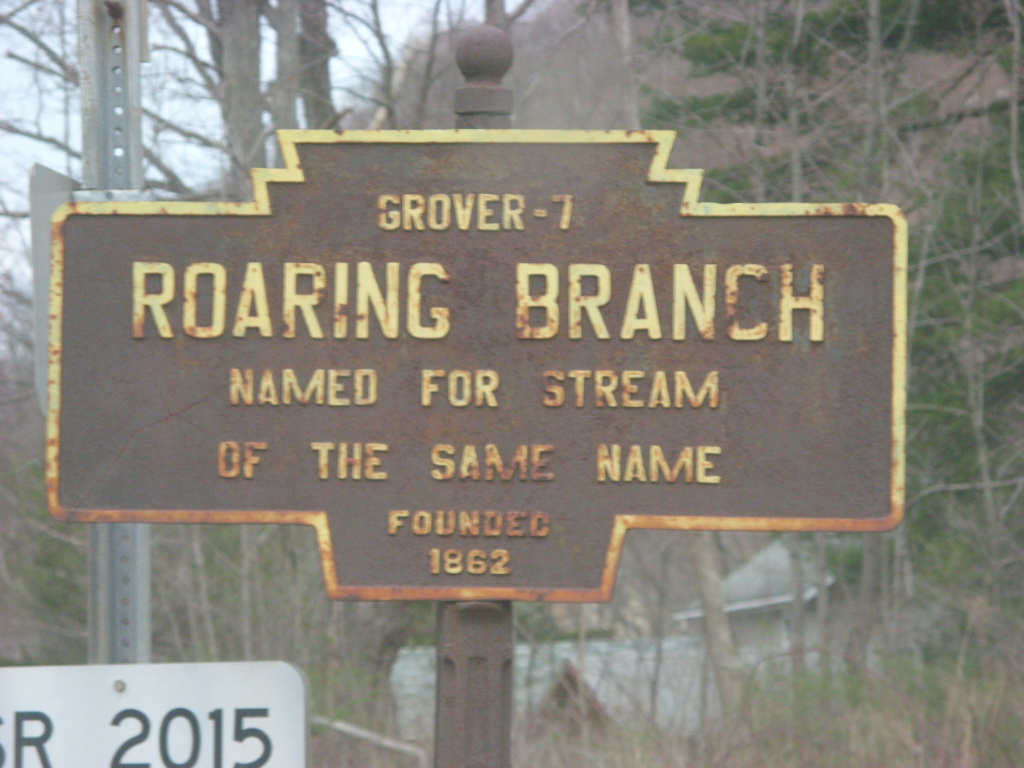
- Keystone Marker

- Location within Pennsylvania Location within the United States
- Country: United States
- State: Pennsylvania
- Counties: Tioga, Lycoming
- Townships: Union, McNett
- Time zone: UTC-5 (Eastern (EST))
  - Summer (DST): UTC-4 (EDT)
- ZIP code: 17765
- Area codes: 272 and 570

Roaring Branch is an unincorporated community in Tioga and Lycoming counties, Pennsylvania, United States.
