= Romney, Pennsylvania =

Romney
- Unincorporated community
- Location within the U.S. state of Pennsylvania Romney (the United States)
- Coordinates: 40°2′44″N 79°24′9″W
- Country: United States
- State: Pennsylvania
- County: Fayette
- Time zone: UTC-5 (Eastern (EST))
  - Summer (DST): UTC-4 (EDT)

Romney is an unincorporated community in Fayette County in the U.S. state of Pennsylvania.
