= Rockdale Acres, Pennsylvania =

- Unincorporated community Census designated place
- Location within Pennsylvania Location within the United States
- Coordinates: 41°45′50.4″N 79°55′22.8″W
- Country: United States
- State: Pennsylvania
- County: Crawford
- Township: Richmond and Rockdale

Area
  - Total: 0.096 sq mi (0.25 km^{2})
  - Land: 0.096 sq mi (0.25 km^{2})
  - Water: 0 sq mi (0 km^{2})
- Elevation: 1,227 ft (374 m)
- Time zone: UTC-5 (Eastern (EST))
  - Summer (DST): UTC-4 (EDT)
- FIPS code: 42-65468
- GNIS feature ID: 28-30889

Rockdale Acres is an unincorporated community and census designated place (CDP) in Richmond Township and Rockdale Township, Crawford County, Pennsylvania.

== Demographics ==
Historical population
Census	Pop.	Note	%±

The United States Census Bureau first defined Rockdale Acres as a census designated place in 2023.
