= Oľšov =

- Municipality
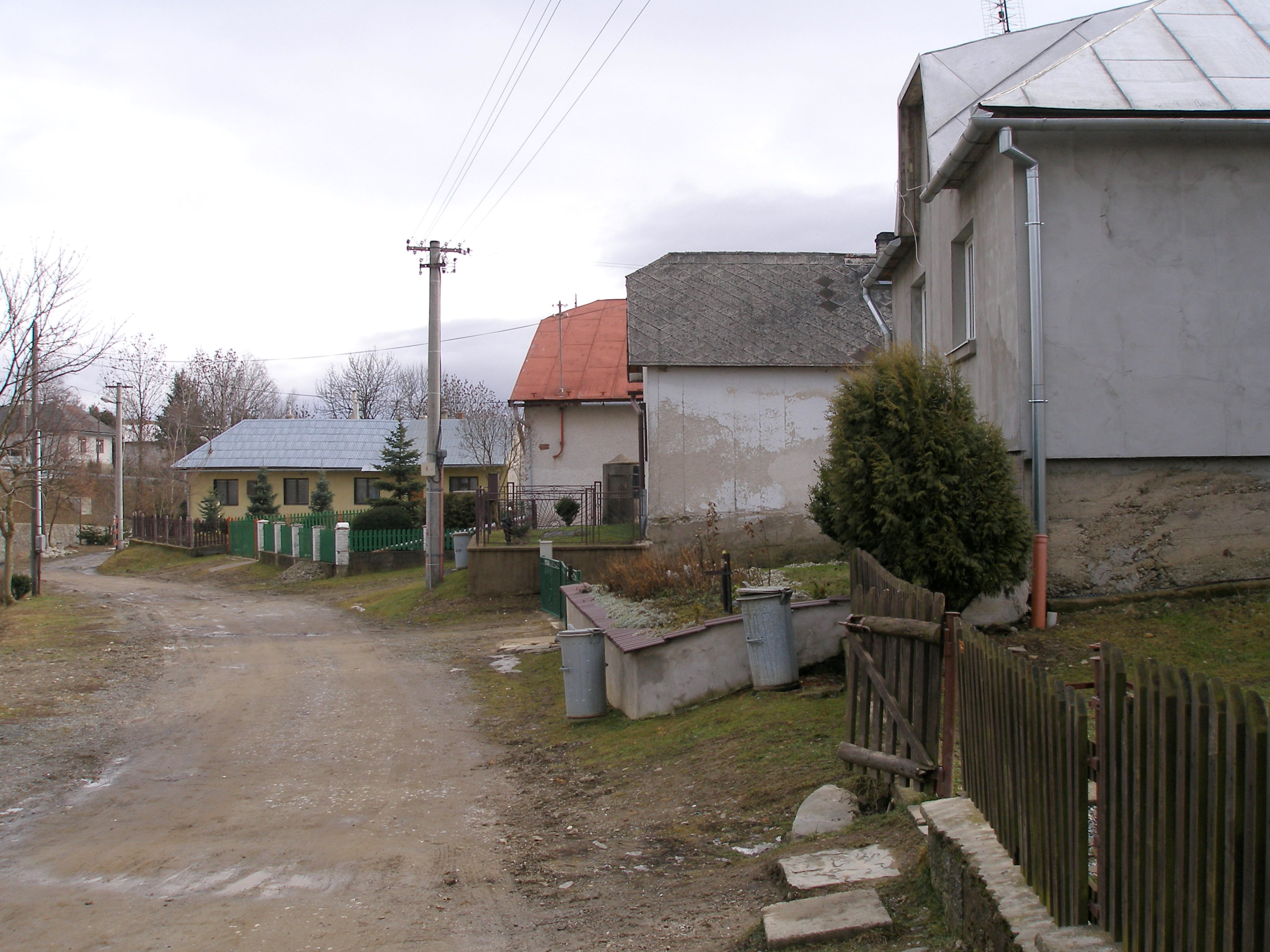

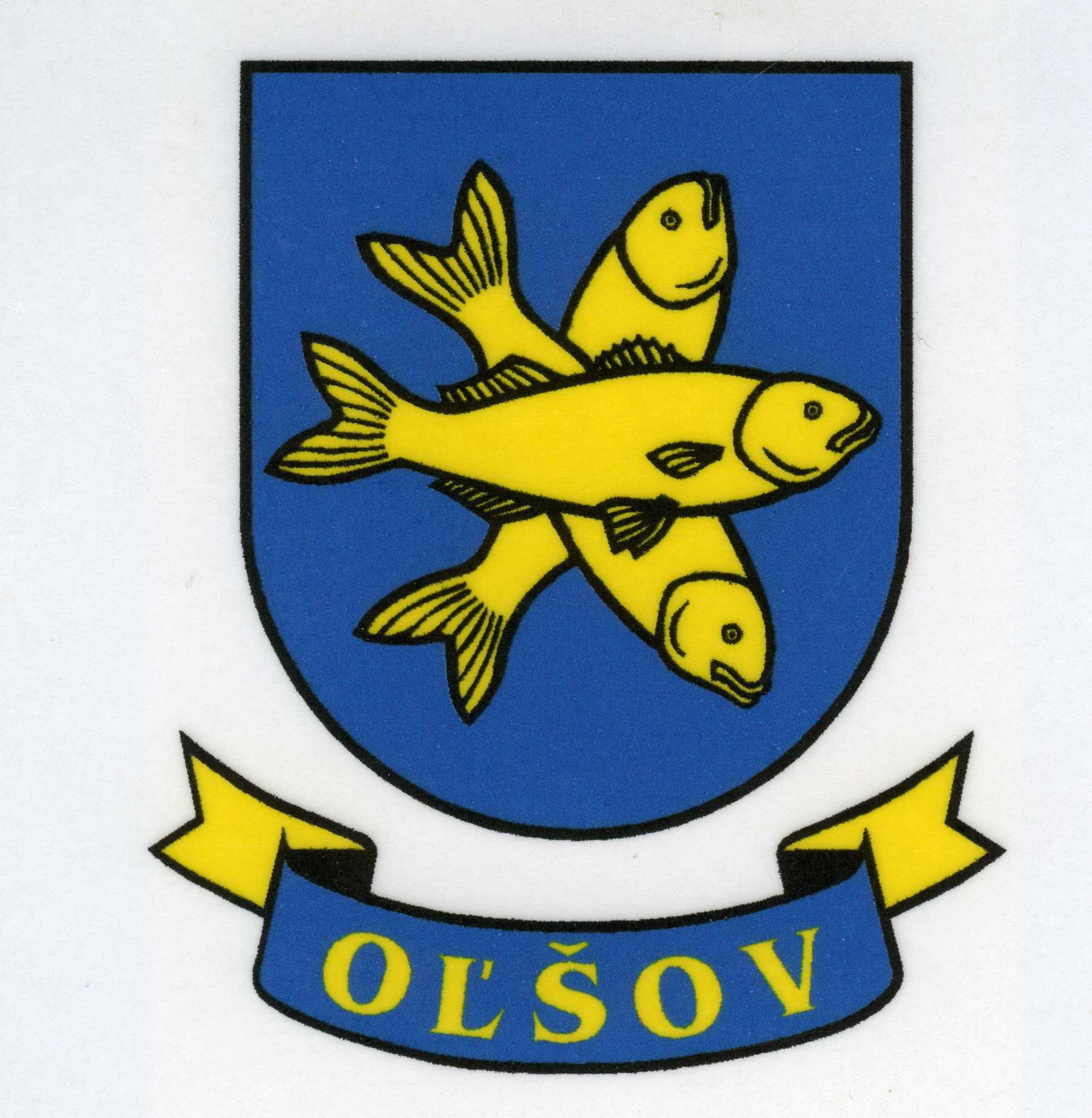
- Flag Coat of arms

- Location of Oľšov in the Prešov Region Location of Oľšov in Slovakia
- Coordinates: 49.17°N 20.88°E
- Country: Slovakia
- Region: Prešov Region
- District: Sabinov District
- First mentioned: 1309

Area
  - Total: 10.16 km^{2} (3.92 sq mi)
- Elevation: 458 m (1,503 ft)

Population (2025)
  - Total: 363
- Time zone: UTC+1 (CET)
  - Summer (DST): UTC+2 (CEST)
- Postal code: 827 3
- Area code: +421 51
- Vehicle registration plate (until 2022): SB
- Website: www.obecolsov.sk

Oľšov is a village and municipality in the Sabinov District in the Prešov Region of north-eastern Slovakia.

== History ==
In historical records the village was first mentioned in 1309. The coat of arms of Oľšov shows three fish which represents the bountiful fishing that was provided by the nearby Torysa River. Below is a chronology of the Hungarian and Slovak names of the village:
1224 - Elsa
1309 - Olsowa
1329 - Vlusa
1336 - Olschwicha
1773 - Olsso, Ollyso, Olyso
1786 - Olyscho
1808 - Olsó, Olysó, Olssawa, Olssowce
1863 - 1913 - Olysó
1920 - Oľšov, Oľšovce
1927 - Oľšov

== Geography ==
The municipality lies at an altitude of 458 metres (1,503 ft) and covers an area of 10.16 km^{2} (3.92 sq mi) (2025).

== Population ==
Population statistic (10 years)
Year	1995	2005	2015	2025
Count	363	407	392	363
Difference		+12.12%	−3.68%	−7.39%

Population statistic
Year	2024	2025
Count	366	363
Difference		−0.81%

It has a population of 363 people (31 December 2025).

=== Ethnicity ===
Census 2021 (1+ %)
Ethnicity	Number	Fraction
Slovak	378	98.69%
Not found out	9	2.34%
Rusyn	4	1.04%
Total	383	

In year 2021 was 383 people by ethnicity 378 as Slovak, 9 as Not found out, 4 as Rusyn, 1 as Russian and 1 as German.

Note on population: The difference values of population numbers in the table "Population statistic" and in the sections "Ethnicity" & "Religion" is caused by the use of various statistical methods.

=== Religion ===
Census 2021 (1+ %)
Religion	Number	Fraction
Roman Catholic Church	361	94.26%
Not found out	7	1.83%
Greek Catholic Church	6	1.57%
None	6	1.57%
Total	383	

In year 2021 was 383 people by religion 361 from Roman Catholic Church, 7 from Not found out, 6 from Greek Catholic Church, 6 from None, 1 from Calvinist Church, 1 from Eastern Orthodox Church and 1 from Other.
