= Reevesdale, Pennsylvania =

Unincorporated community in Pennsylvania, US

Reevesdale
- Unincorporated community
- Location within the state of Pennsylvania Reevesdale (the United States)
- Coordinates: 40°46′54″N 76°00′43″W
- Country: United States
- State: Pennsylvania
- County: Schuylkill
- Elevation: 971 ft (296 m)
- Time zone: UTC-5 (Eastern (EST))
  - Summer (DST): UTC-4 (EDT)
- Area code: 570
- GNIS feature ID: 1204481

Reevesdale is an unincorporated community and coal town in Schuylkill County, Pennsylvania, United States, 2.6 miles south of Tamaqua.
