= North Penn-Liberty High School =

North Penn - Liberty High School
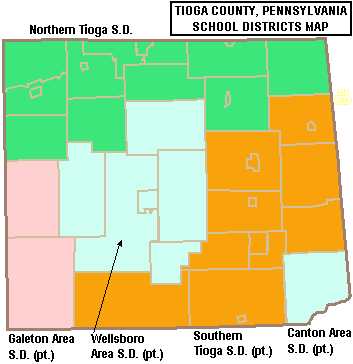

Location
- 8675 Route 414; Liberty, Tioga County, Pennsylvania 16930; United States; 41.5591°N 77.1117°W

Information
- Type: Public
- Principal: Mrs. Emily Ostrom-Graham
- Faculty: 20 teachers (2014)
- Grades: 7th - 12th
- Enrollment: 299 pupils (2015-16)
- Language: English
- Website: https://nplhs.southerntioga.org/

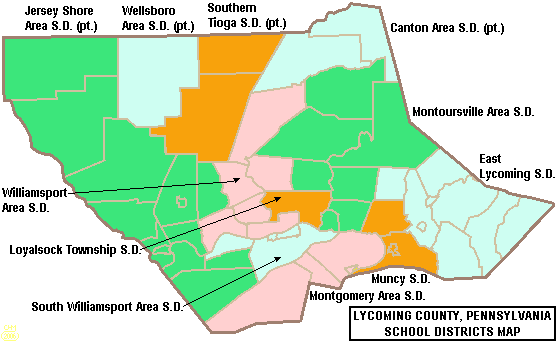
Southern Tioga School District region in Lycoming County

North Penn - Liberty High School is a diminutive, rural, public high school located at 8675 Route 414, Liberty, Tioga County, Pennsylvania, US. It is one of two high schools operated by Southern Tioga School District. North Penn - Liberty High School serves the southern portion of the district in Tioga County, as well as two townships in northern Lycoming County: Jackson Township and Cogan House. Formerly called Liberty High School, the building's name was changed when the Southern Tioga School Board closed North Penn High School in 2014, shifting students to this school building.

In 2015, North Penn-Liberty High School enrollment was reported as 299 pupils in 7th through 12th grades. North Penn-Liberty High School employed 22 teachers.

== Extracurriculars ==
Southern Tioga School District offers an extensive program of after school clubs, arts programs and a three times duplicated interscholastic athletics program.

=== Sports ===
The district funds:

Boys

- Basketball - A
- Soccer - A
- Tennis - AA
- Wrestling - AA

Girls

- Basketball - AA
- Softball - A
- Tennis - AA
- Volleyball - added 2015

Junior high school sports

Boys

- Basketball
- Soccer
- Tennis

Girls

- Basketball
- Softball
- Tennis

- According to PIAA directory July 2015
