= Rosebud, Pennsylvania =

- Unincorporated community Census designated place
- Location within Pennsylvania Location within the United States
- Coordinates: 40°45′18.0″N 78°32′20.4″W
- Country: United States
- State: Pennsylvania
- County: Clearfield
- Township: Beccaria

Area
  - Total: 0.542 sq mi (1.40 km^{2})
  - Land: 0.53 sq mi (1.4 km^{2})
  - Water: 0.012 sq mi (0.031 km^{2})
- Elevation: 1,434 ft (437 m)
- Time zone: UTC-5 (Eastern (EST))
  - Summer (DST): UTC-4 (EDT)
- FIPS code: 4266048
- GNIS feature ID: 2830891

Rosebud is an unincorporated community and census designated place (CDP) in Beccaria Township, Clearfield County, Pennsylvania.

== Demographics ==
Historical population
Census	Pop.	Note	%±
U.S. Decennial Census

The United States Census Bureau first defined Rosebud as a census designated place in 2023.
