= Randolph Township, Pennsylvania =

Township in Pennsylvania, US

Coordinates: 41°38′00″N 80°00′59″W

Randolph Township, Crawford County, Pennsylvania
- Township
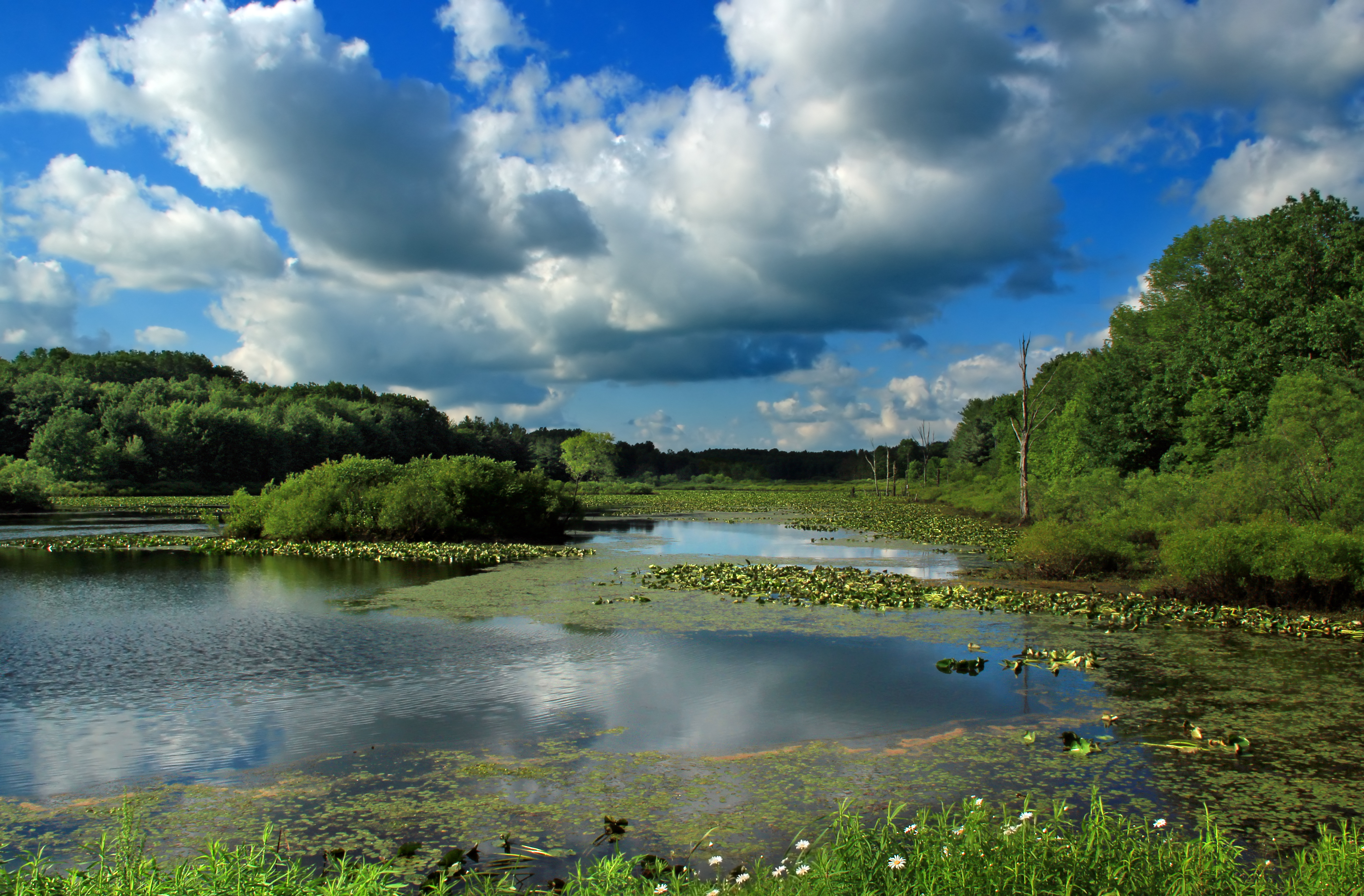
- Erie National Wildlife Refuge (Sugar Lake Division) in Randolph Township

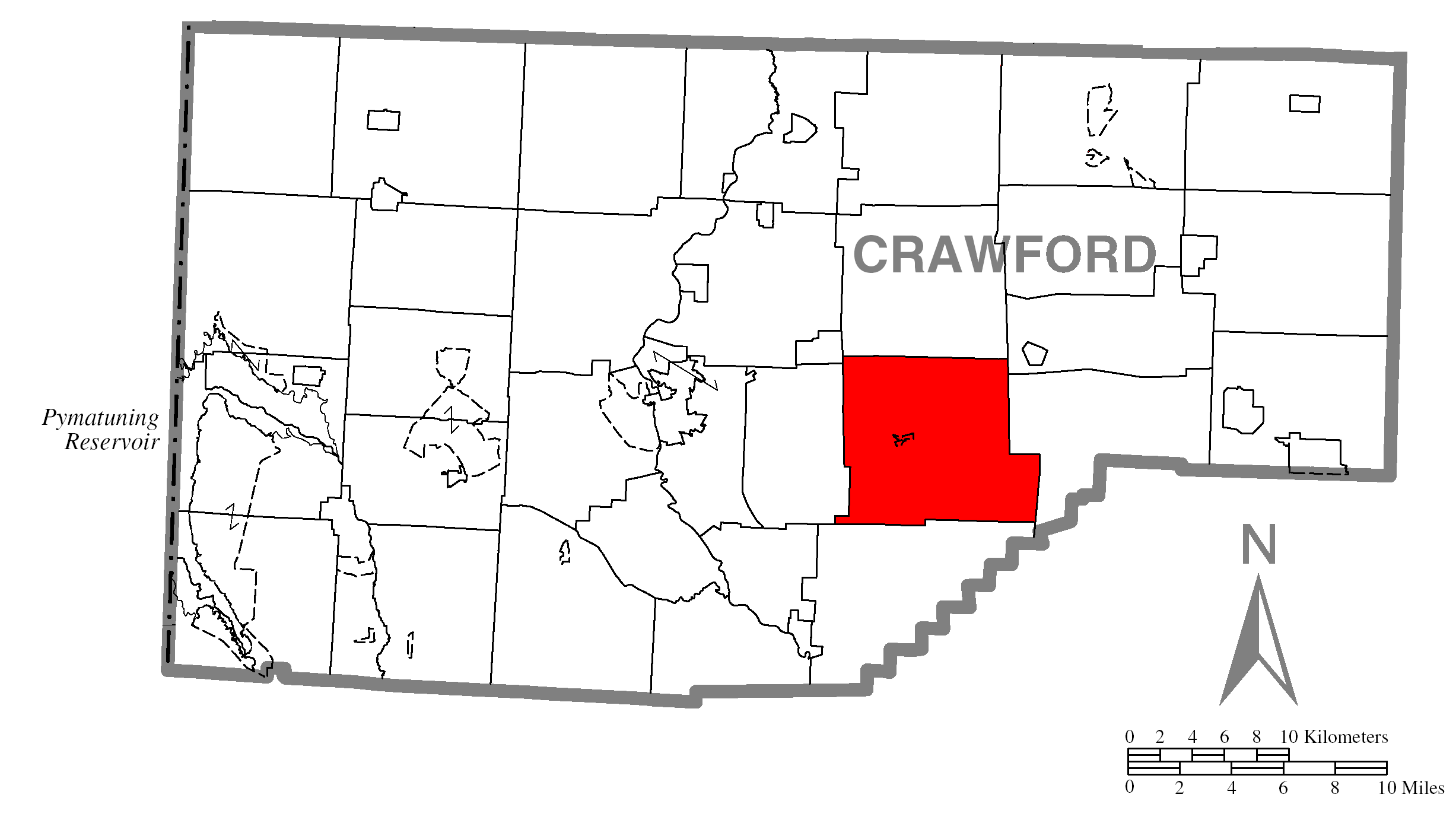
- Location of Randolph Township in Crawford County

- Location of Crawford County in Pennsylvania
- Country: United States
- State: Pennsylvania
- County: Crawford County

Area
  - Total: 43.08 sq mi (111.58 km^{2})
  - Land: 42.75 sq mi (110.72 km^{2})
  - Water: 0.33 sq mi (0.86 km^{2})
- Highest elevation (east of Basil Corners): 1,610 ft (490 m)
- Lowest elevation (Lake Creek and Woodcock Creek): 1,300 ft (400 m)

Population (2020)
  - Total: 1,719 ▼
  - Estimate (2024): 1,690
  - Density: 40/sq mi (15.6/km^{2})
- Time zone: UTC-4 (EST)
  - Summer (DST): UTC-5 (EDT)
- Area code: 814
- FIPS code: 42-039-63400

Randolph Township is a township in Crawford County, Pennsylvania, United States. The population was 1,719 at the 2020 census, down from 1,782 at the 2010 census.

== Geography ==
Randolph Township is in east-central Crawford County. The unincorporated community of Guys Mills is near the center of the township. According to the United States Census Bureau, the township has a total area of 43.1 square miles (111.6 km^{2}), of which 42.7 square miles (110.7 km^{2}) is land and 0.35 square miles (0.9 km^{2}), or 0.77%, is water.

== Demographics ==
Historical population
Census	Pop.	Note	%±
2000	1,838		—
2010	1,782		−3.0%
2020	1,719		−3.5%
2024 (est.)	1,690		−1.7%
U.S. Decennial Census

As of the census of 2000, there were 1,838 people, 651 households, and 511 families residing in the township. The population density was 42.6 inhabitants per square mile (16.4/km^{2}). There were 720 housing units at an average density of 16.7/sq mi (6.4/km^{2}). The racial makeup of the township was 99.02% White, 0.38% African American, 0.11% Native American, 0.27% Asian, and 0.22% from two or more races. Hispanic or Latino of any race were 0.38% of the population.

There were 651 households, out of which 34.4% had children under the age of 18 living with them, 67.1% were married couples living together, 6.9% had a female householder with no husband present, and 21.4% were non-families. 18.7% of all households were made up of individuals, and 7.8% had someone living alone who was 65 years of age or older. The average household size was 2.76 and the average family size was 3.15.

In the township the population was spread out, with 27.8% under the age of 18, 7.5% from 18 to 24, 26.8% from 25 to 44, 25.4% from 45 to 64, and 12.5% who were 65 years of age or older. The median age was 37 years. For every 100 females, there were 104.7 males. For every 100 females age 18 and over, there were 99.5 males.

The median income for a household in the township was $35,677, and the median income for a family was $40,345. Males had a median income of $31,953 versus $21,711 for females. The per capita income for the township was $15,939. About 6.2% of families and 9.4% of the population were below the poverty line, including 15.4% of those under age 18 and 4.8% of those age 65 or over.
