= Randolph, Pennsylvania =

Unincorporated community in Pennsylvania, US

Randolph
- Unincorporated community
- Location within the state of Pennsylvania Randolph (the United States)
- Coordinates: 40°9′2″N 79°00′8″W
- Country: United States
- State: Pennsylvania
- County: Somerset
- Elevation: 1,893 ft (577 m)
- Time zone: UTC-5 (Eastern (EST))
  - Summer (DST): UTC-4 (EDT)
- GNIS feature ID: 1184644

Randolph is an unincorporated community and coal town in Somerset County, Pennsylvania, United States. Randolph Coal Company operated a mine in Randolph in 1918.
