= Reading Number Three, Pennsylvania =

Unincorporated community in Pennsylvania, US

Reading Number Three
- Unincorporated community
- Location within the state of Pennsylvania Reading Number Three (the United States)
- Coordinates: 40°5′16″N 78°57′39″W
- Country: United States
- State: Pennsylvania
- County: Somerset
- Elevation: 1,814 ft (553 m)
- Time zone: UTC-5 (Eastern (EST))
  - Summer (DST): UTC-4 (EDT)
- GNIS feature ID: 1184736

Reading Number Three is an unincorporated community and coal town in Somerset County, Pennsylvania, United States.
