= Rausch Creek, Pennsylvania =

Populated place in Schuylkill County, Pennsylvania

Coordinates: 40°36′43″N 76°25′35″W

Rausch Creek is a populated place in Schuylkill County, Pennsylvania in the United States.
