= Reduction, Pennsylvania =

Unincorporated community in Pennsylvania, US

- Unincorporated community
- Location within Pennsylvania
- Coordinates: 40°11′01″N 79°46′15″W
- Country: United States
- State: Pennsylvania
- County: Westmoreland
- Elevation: 919 ft (280 m)
- Time zone: UTC-5 (Eastern (EST))
  - Summer (DST): UTC-4 (EDT)
- Area code: 724
- GNIS feature ID: 1184816

Reduction (also Flynns) is an unincorporated community in South Huntingdon Township, Westmoreland County, Pennsylvania. United States. The community is located on the Youghiogheny River. Its population is 60, down from a peak of 400.

== History ==
American Reduction Company, a garbage processing company, founded the community to provide housing for its workers at a local garbage plant. The plant closed in 1936, and in 1948, John Stawovy bought the town for $10,000. Their son David put the community up for sale again in 2017.
