= Ramsaytown, Pennsylvania =

Unincorporated community in Pennsylvania, U.S.

Coordinates: 41°04′50″N 79°04′00″W

Ramsaytown is an unincorporated community in Jefferson County, in the U.S. state of Pennsylvania.

== History ==
Ramsaytown was originally a mining community. A post office called Ramsaytown was established in 1906, and remained in operation until 1934.
