= Covington Township, Tioga County, Pennsylvania =

Township in Pennsylvania, US

Coordinates: 41°44′00″N 77°06′59″W

- Township
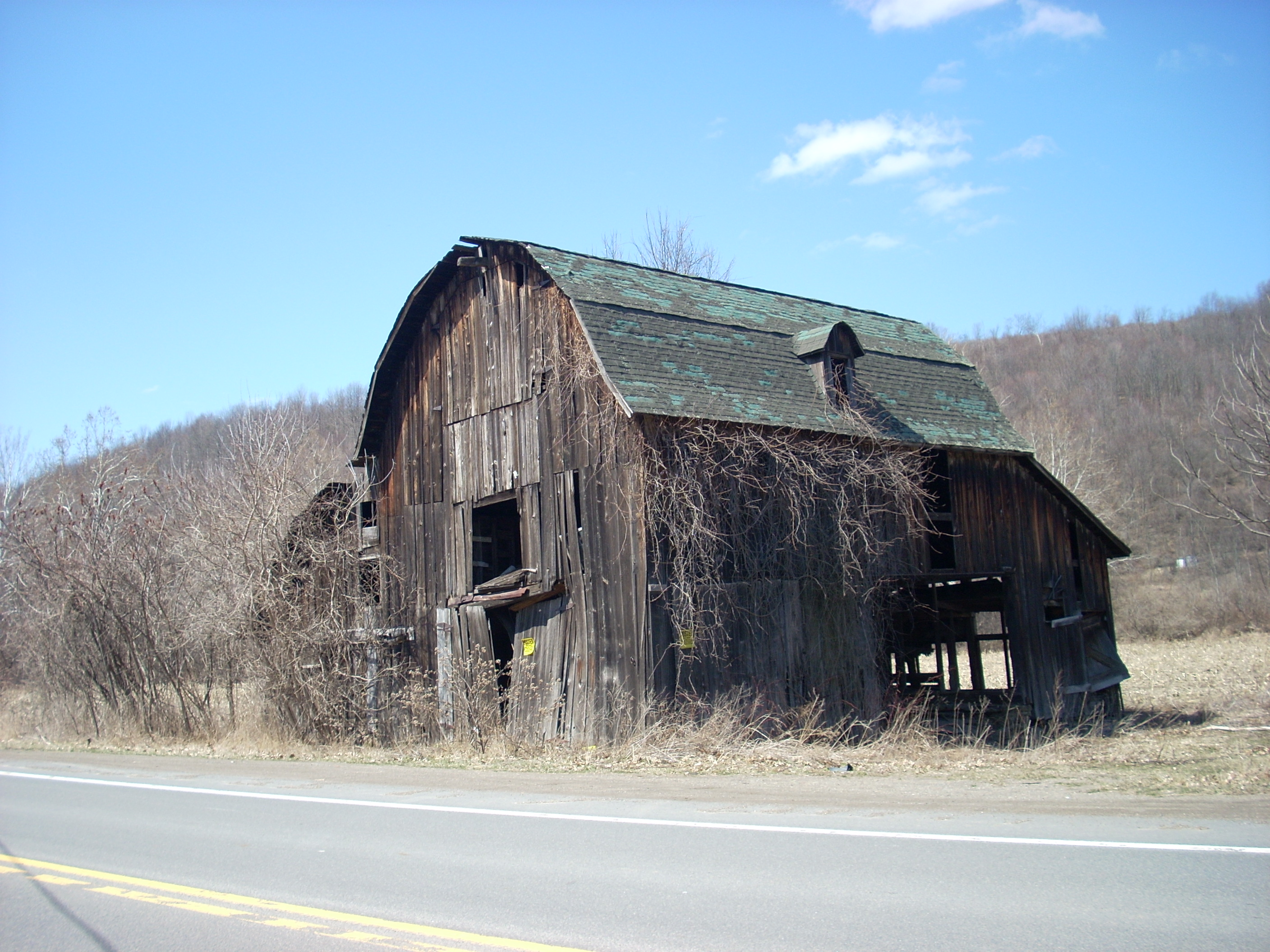
- An old barn in Covington Township

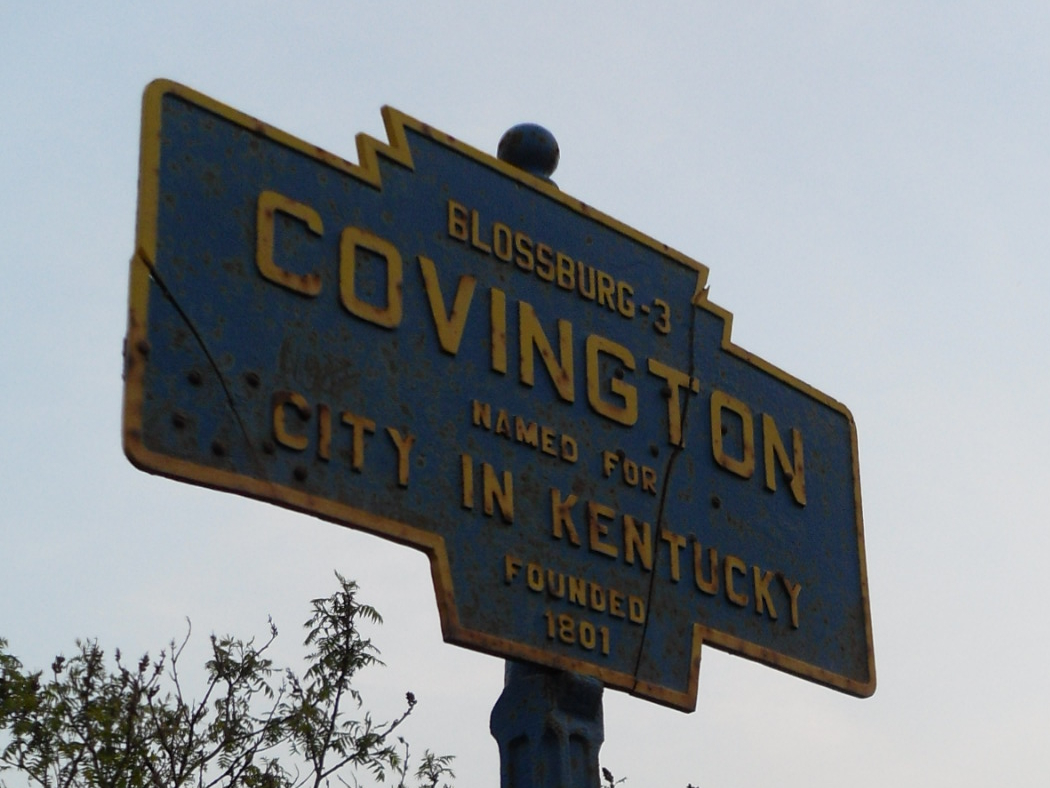
- Keystone Marker

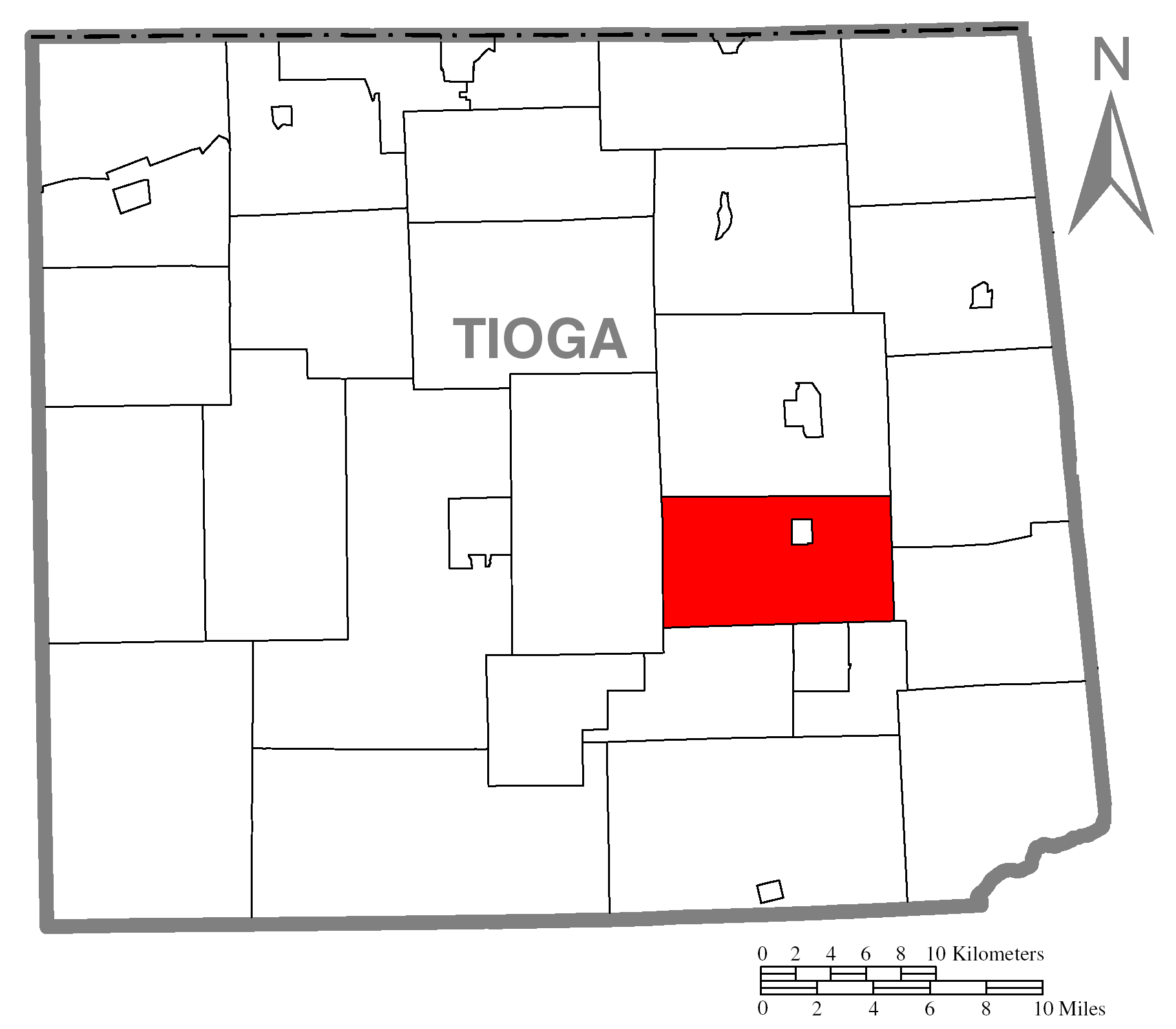
- Map of Tioga County Highlighting Covington Township

- Map of Pennsylvania highlighting Tioga County
- Country: United States
- State: Pennsylvania
- County: Tioga
- Settled: 1801
- Incorporated: 1815

Area
  - Total: 36.44 sq mi (94.38 km^{2})
  - Land: 36.40 sq mi (94.28 km^{2})
  - Water: 0.039 sq mi (0.10 km^{2})

Population (2020)
  - Total: 1,031 ▲
  - Estimate (2023): 1,018
  - Density: 28.1/sq mi (10.85/km^{2})
- Time zone: Eastern Time Zone (North America)
  - Summer (DST): EDT
- FIPS code: 42-117-16680
- Website: www.covingtontownship.com

Historical population
Census	Pop.	Note	%±
2000	1,047		—
2010	1,022		−2.4%
2020	1,031		0.9%
2023 (est.)	1,018		−1.3%
U.S. Decennial Census

Covington Township is a township in Tioga County, Pennsylvania, United States. The population was 1,031 at the 2020 census.

== Geography ==
According to the United States Census Bureau, the township has a total area of 36.3 square miles (94 km^{2}), of which 36.3 square miles (94 km^{2}) is land and 0.04 square miles (0.10 km^{2}) (0.11%) is water.

== Demographics ==
As of the census of 2000, there were 1,047 people, 402 households, and 297 families residing in the township. The population density was 28.9 inhabitants per square mile (11.2/km^{2}). There were 470 housing units at an average density of 13.0/sq mi (5.0/km^{2}). The racial makeup of the township was 97.52% White, 0.10% African American, 0.38% Native American, 0.29% Asian, and 1.72% from two or more races. Hispanic or Latino of any race were 0.57% of the population.

There were 402 households, out of which 34.6% had children under the age of 18 living with them, 62.7% were married couples living together, 6.0% had a female householder with no husband present, and 26.1% were non-families. 20.4% of all households were made up of individuals, and 10.0% had someone living alone who was 65 years of age or older. The average household size was 2.60 and the average family size was 3.01.

In the township the population was spread out, with 26.4% under the age of 18, 7.0% from 18 to 24, 30.0% from 25 to 44, 24.4% from 45 to 64, and 12.3% who were 65 years of age or older. The median age was 37 years. For every 100 females, there were 101.7 males. For every 100 females age 18 and over, there were 103.4 males.

The median income for a household in the township was $34,375, and the median income for a family was $38,203. Males had a median income of $26,912 versus $19,922 for females. The per capita income for the township was $16,802. About 11.4% of families and 15.2% of the population were below the poverty line, including 20.7% of those under age 18 and 21.1% of those age 65 or over.

== Communities and locations ==
- Cherry Flats – A village located near the western township line.
- Tioga State Forest – The Tioga State Forest covers much of south-central Covington Township.

== Notable person ==
- John Patton, Congressman.
