= Tropical Storm Beryl (1994) =

Atlantic tropical storm

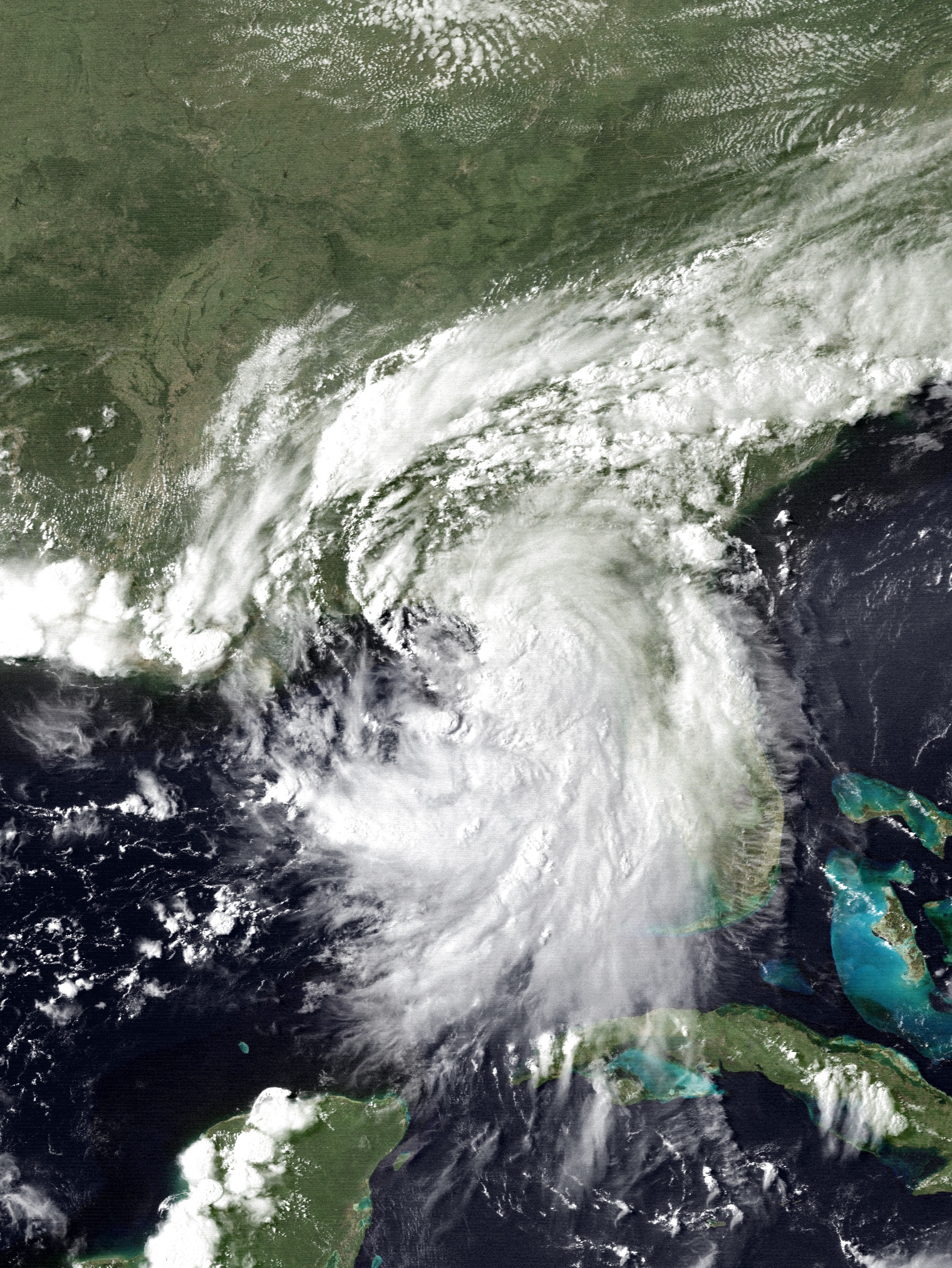
- Beryl near peak intensity off the Floridan coast on August 15

Meteorological history
- Formed: August 14, 1994
- Dissipated: August 19, 1994

Tropical storm
- 1-minute sustained (SSHWS/NWS)
- Highest winds: 60 mph (95 km/h)
- Lowest pressure: 999 mbar (hPa); 29.50 inHg

Overall effects
- Fatalities: 6 total
- Damage: $74.2 million (1994 USD)
- Areas affected: Gulf Coast of the United States, Eastern United States
- IBTrACS
- Part of the 1994 Atlantic hurricane season

Tropical Storm Beryl caused flooding in several states in the Eastern United States in August 1994. The second named storm and third tropical cyclone of the annual hurricane season, Beryl developed from an upper-level low pressure area over the northeastern Gulf of Mexico on August 14. Initially a tropical depression, the system intensified into a tropical storm about 24 hours after forming. Beryl then moved slowly northeastward and peaked with maximum sustained winds of 60 mph (95 km/h) before making landfall near Panama City, Florida, early on August 16. Within 12 hours of moving inland, the storm weakened to a tropical depression, but persisted as a tropical cyclone for a few days while traversing the Eastern United States. Beryl was absorbed by a frontal system while situated over Connecticut early on August 19.

In Florida, above normal tides in the panhandle caused erosion, damaged several boats, and drowned two people. Tropical storm force winds left about 20,000 people without electricity, while flooding from heavy rainfall damaged vehicles and roads. Property damage in the state reached about $5.9 million (1994 USD). (Note: All damage figures are in 1994 USD, unless otherwise noted) Farther inland, Beryl spawned many tornadoes and resulted in flooding as far north of New England. In Georgia one person drowned in a flooded river and another person who was paralyzed in a car crash would succumb to her injuries in 2026. In South Carolina, the state suffering the most damage, a total of 23 tornadoes were spawned, including three rated F3 on the Fujita scale. One tornado in Lexington damaged or destroyed 200 homes and 40 to 50 buildings and caused about 15,000 people to lose power after damaging five electrical substations. The state of New York experienced the worst of the flooding, with flash flooding in the Susquehanna and western Catskills regions. Two deaths and $12 million in damage occurred in New York. Overall, Beryl left six fatalities and at least $74.22 million in damage.

== Meteorological history ==
Map plotting the storm's track and intensity, according to the Saffir–Simpson scale Map key Saffir–Simpson scale Tropical depression (≤38 mph, ≤62 km/h) Tropical storm (39–73 mph, 63–118 km/h) Category 1 (74–95 mph, 119–153 km/h) Category 2 (96–110 mph, 154–177 km/h) Category 3 (111–129 mph, 178–208 km/h) Category 4 (130–156 mph, 209–251 km/h) Category 5 (≥157 mph, ≥252 km/h) Unknown Storm type Tropical cyclone Subtropical cyclone Extratropical cyclone, remnant low, tropical disturbance, or monsoon depression

A large upper-level low pressure area developed over the southwestern Atlantic Ocean to the north of Puerto Rico on August 9. The disturbance moved westward, and despite weakening to a trough in the upper levels of the atmosphere, there was evidence of a low- to mid-level circulation off the southwest coast of Florida on August 12. The next day, surface observations and ship reports suggested the presence of a weak 1,014 mbar (29.9 inHg) surface low pressure system. Moving towards the north-northwest, a cloud-pattern was identified on satellite imagery, and Dvorak estimates were initiated at 00:00 UTC on August 14. Based on data from surface observations, satellite imagery, and information from reconnaissance aircraft, the system is estimated to have become a tropical depression at 12:00 UTC on August 14; at the time, the depression was located approximately 120 miles (190 km) south of Pensacola, Florida.

Initially, the depression was predicted to move inland within the next 24 hours and intensify only slightly. The depression drifted slowly towards the north after being designated, while its poorly defined center of circulation became better defined. Between 16:30 and 20:11 UTC on August 14, the system was nearly stationary; a few hours later, there were indications that the storm's center reformed to the east of its original location. The depression tracked slowly towards the east-northeast while producing rainfall throughout portions of Florida. By early on August 15, the cyclone was becoming further organized, with satellite imagery indicating better defined rainbands. Shortly thereafter, wind observations suggested that the cyclone was approaching tropical storm intensity. A reconnaissance aircraft flight recorded winds of 46 to 49 mph (74 to 79 km/h) to the southeast of the center, while offshore and coastal stations measured sustained winds of 35 mph (56 km/h) and gusts up to 46 mph (74 km/h).

At 12:00 UTC on August 15, the depression strengthened into Tropical Storm Beryl, based on a reconnaissance aircraft flight observing 58 mph (93 km/h) at an altitude of 1,500 ft (460 m). Possibly influenced by a mesoscale featured noted to the south of Beryl's circulation, the center of circulation began moving erratically after being upgraded. However, in response to an approaching trough, the storm turned towards the north. At 00:00 UTC on August 16, Beryl reached its maximum sustained wind speed of 60 mph (95 km/h) and then made landfall near Panama City, Florida. It is estimated that the storm attained its minimum barometric pressure of 999 mbar (29.5 inHg) about three hours after moving inland. About 12 hours after moving ashore, around 12:00 UTC on August 16, Beryl weakened to a tropical depression. With increasing forward motion, the depression continued towards the north-northeast. At 21:00 UTC, the National Hurricane Center ceased issuing advisories on Beryl, transferring responsibility to the Weather Prediction Center. Despite weakening, the system maintained rainbands accompanied by thunderstorms and heavy rainfall. The low continued to track northeastward; after passing through Connecticut, the low was absorbed into a frontal trough on August 19.

== Preparations ==
In advance of the storm, a tropical storm watch was posted along of the Gulf Coast of Florida from Pensacola to Cedar Key on August 15. Later that day, the watch was replaced with a tropical storm warning that extended from Fort Walton Beach to Yankeetown. The warning was discontinued for areas west of Apalachicola, and by 12:00 UTC on August 16, all tropical cyclone warnings and watches were lifted. Initially, the public advisories issued by the National Hurricane Center on the storm warned primarily of heavy rain, as Beryl was expected to remain a weak cyclone. However, when the storm slowed in forward motion and the potential for intensification increased, the advisories emphasized the potential for coastal flooding. Tornado watches were issued for parts of Florida. Flash flood watches and warnings were also declared for parts of the state.

Flash flood watches, warnings, and tornado watches were posted for portions of Georgia as Beryl progressed inland. Flash flood watches and warnings were also initiated throughout parts of South Carolina, North Carolina, Virginia, West Virginia, and Maryland. A tornado watch was declared for central and eastern North Carolina on August 17; similar advisories were placed into effect over parts of New Jersey, Delaware, Maryland, and Virginia. Flash flood advisories were also issued northward into New York.

== Impact ==
Tropical Storm Beryl was a weak system, and unlike Alberto, its rapid motion up the Eastern Seaboard spread its heavy rainfall across a large area. Beryl caused inland flooding as it moved through Georgia, across the Carolinas, and all the way to Connecticut. Property damage reached at least $74.22 million, with $40 million in damage in South Carolina, $15 million in Virginia, $12 million in New York, $5.9 million in Florida, and at least $1.32 million in Georgia. Five deaths were reported, while a large number of people – 37 in Lexington County, South Carolina, alone – were injured by the tornadoes Beryl produced as it weakened.

=== Florida ===
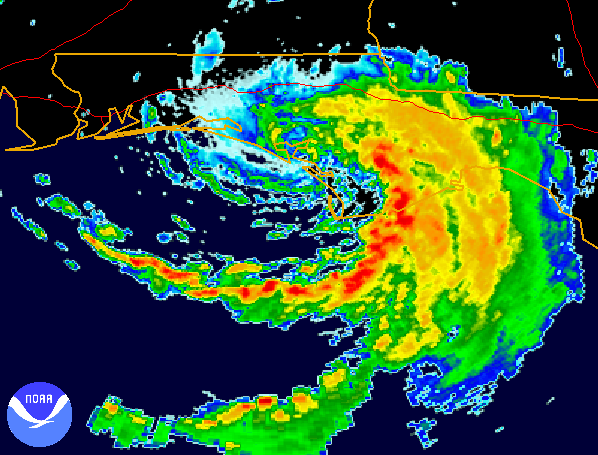
NEXRAD imagery of Tropical Storm Beryl making landfall in Florida on August 16

Along the coast of the Florida Panhandle, tides ranging from 3 to 5 ft (0.91 to 1.52 m) above normal were reported. Two people drowned due to rip currents produced by Beryl. Several moored boats were damaged, while three people on a fishing boat offshore were rescued. Coastal flooding and erosion occurred, undermining roads and homes and damaging seawalls. The highest observed precipitation total in the state was 10.69 in (272 mm) in Apalachicola, though heavier rainfall likely occurred in areas to the east. In addition, precipitation from Tropical Storm Alberto earlier in the season and Beryl produced nearly 30 in (762 mm) of rain in some areas of the Florida Panhandle in the span of barely more than a month. Flooding occurred in low-lying areas, damaging cars and homes. Oysters in the Apalachicola Bay could not be harvested in the prime winter of 1994, due to runoff from the sediment of rivers, from 10 in (250 mm) of rain. At the Tallahassee International Airport, a sustained wind speed of 53 mph (85 km/h) and a wind gust of 64 mph (103 km/h) were observed. Wind caused minor damage to roofs and downed trees, signs, and power lines, leaving about 20,000 customers without electricity. Damage in the state as a result of Beryl was estimated at $5.9 million.

=== Georgia and the Carolinas ===
Beryl dropped heavy rainfall in parts of Georgia, with up to 13.59 in (345 mm) observed in Tallulah Falls. About 5 to 7 in (130 to 180 mm) of precipitation fell in Habersham County in less than six hours. Throughout northeastern Georgia, several roads were flooded or washed out, while numerous roads in that state were also effected by mudslides. Pressure from the floodwaters damaged a number of culverts and sewer lines. One death and three injuries occurred in the Chattooga River when a group of people went rafting in the rain-swollen river. The storm spawned at least two tornadoes in the state. The first, an F1 spawned near Hartwell, demolished two mobile homes, tossed two others, and uprooted several large trees, leaving about $320,000 in property damage. Near Lexington, the other tornado, rated F2, destroyed a two-story wood, 2,500 sq ft (230 m^{2}) wood-frame dwelling; three boiler homes; and two chicken houses, killing about 30,000 chickens. A number of pecan trees were uprooted. The tornado left about $700,000 in damage.

The outer bands of Beryl spawned 23 tornadoes in South Carolina, the largest tornado outbreak on record in the state, until the remnants of Hurricane Frances in 2004 produced more twisters. Several of the tornadoes touched down in the vicinity of Lexington. An F3 tornado in the area damaged or destroyed 200 homes and 40 to 50 buildings, including a shopping center and five electrical substations, which left approximately 15,000 people without power. A total of 40 people were injured by the tornado before it lifted at Lake Murray, after traveling about 5 mi (8.0 km). Another F3 tornado touched down 4 mi (6.4 km) south of Lexington, where it completely leveled a square stick frame home. Three other tornadoes touched down in Lexington County, one of which – rated F1 – overturned a mobile home, causing one serious injury. Outside of Lexington County, a few other tornadoes caused significant damage. A twister that moved along a 2 to 3 mi (3.2 to 4.8 km) path through parts of Union, Spartanburg, and Cherokee counties, deroofing a restaurant in Carlisle and damaging several homes and mobile homes, leaving nearly $80,000 in damage in Cowpens. The National Weather Service office in Columbia failed to detect a brief tornado in southwest Richland County after the WSR-88D radar went offline for about 22 minutes, while the backup WSR-74 radar did not spot the tornado either.

Heavy rainfall was observed in some parts of South Carolina with about 12 in (300 mm) falling in the mountainous region of the state, including a peak precipitation total of 17.45 in (443 mm) near Lake Jocassee. The Saluda River north of Greenville experienced its worst flooding in at least 60 years, while the Reedy River reached moderate flood stage in Greenville. Several businesses and homes along the Saluda River and its tributaries were flooded or destroyed. Mudslides and flood waters in Oconee County damaged a number of bridges and roadways. Damage in South Carolina reached about $40 million, with $37 million of that total caused by tornadoes and thunderstorm winds. After the storm, then-Governor Carroll A. Campbell Jr. declared a state of emergency for Lexington County due to tornado damage and dispatched 100 South Carolina National Guard police to the area.

The storm produced 5 to 9 in (130 to 230 mm) of precipitation in western North Carolina. Flashing flooding and rapidly rising streams forced hundreds of people to evacuate. The French Broad River at Rosman crested at 14.1 ft (4.3 m), nearly 1 ft (0.30 m) short of the record height set during Hurricane Hilda in 1964. Floodwaters washed out bridges and roads and resulted the closure of businesses and schools in several counties. Farther east, Guilford County observed 1.28 in (33 mm) of rain in only 33 minutes, flooding numerous roads and causing 11 car accidents, with one person succumbing to her injuries in 2026. Several tornadoes were also spawned in the state. The first tornado was an F1 twister that touched down near Earl. It destroyed a mobile home, severely damaged another home, and downed several trees and power lines. An F2 spawned in northern Catawba County near Hickory destroyed two mobile home and another home, damaged several chimneys and roofs, acutely damaged cars and trucks, and overturned a number of trailers. In Iredell County, an F0 tornado damaged six mobile homes, toppled a wall at a home under construction, and knocked over trees and power lines. Another F1 tornado in Harnett County near Buies Creek downed a number of trees and damaged several mobile homes, trapping some people inside.

=== Mid-Atlantic ===
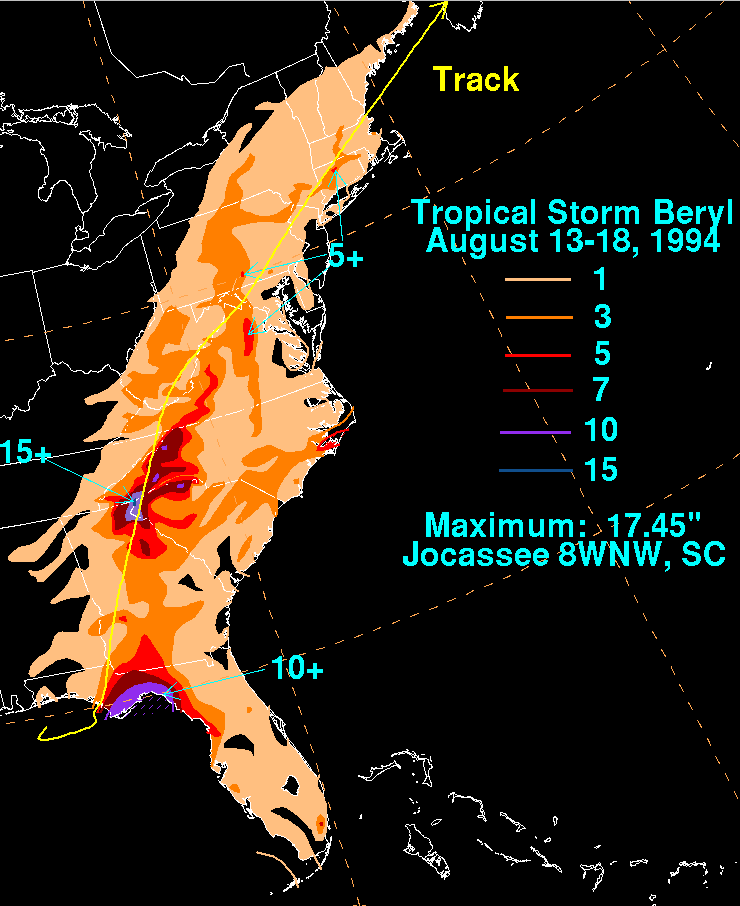
Rainfall accumulations from Tropical Storm Beryl across the Eastern United States

In Virginia, up to 7 in (180 mm) of rain fell in Carroll County. Flash flooding occurred in several counties, though high waters caused little impact other than inundating roads and low bridges. Thunderstorm winds knocked down some trees, with six falling on power lines in Cana, leaving about 500 people without electricity. A tornado touched down near Martinsville and remained on the ground for about 4.25 mi (6.84 km). Throughout its path, the tornado damaged approximately 30 businesses and 100 homes, leaving about $8.7 million in damage. Ten people suffered injuries due to the twister. In West Virginia, 2 to 4 in (51 to 102 mm) of rainfall in a short period of time in some areas resulted in street flooding in Morgan and Pendleton. In the latter, two homes washed away. The remnants of Beryl spawned two tornadoes in the state. One tornado mainly left downed trees in Morgan County, while the damaged three homes, destroyed a shed, and uprooted trees in Berkeley County. Thunderstorms associated with Beryl's remnants dropped 3 to 5 in (76 to 127 mm) of rainfall in parts of Maryland. Creeks in the region rose to elevated levels, flooding roads, yards, and basements.

Heavy rainfall was also recorded in some areas of Pennsylvania. In Bradford County, the worst of the flooding occurred in the western side of the county, especially in areas adjacent to Buck and Bentley creeks. At Wells Township, State Route 549 was washed out and flooding damaged 8 businesses and 17 homes. In Waverly, the basement of the Village Hall and annex building were both flooded, damaging village archives and police equipment. Throughout the county, about 30 roads, including U.S. Route 6 and state routes 14 and 4028, were closed because of high water or debris, while a bridge in Smithfield Township was washed out. A total of 35 people evacuated from their homes due to flooding. In Lycoming County, the Lycoming Creek crested at heights exceeding records set during Hurricane Agnes in 1972. Nearly all roads in the central and western portions of the county were shut down due to water inundation. About 350 people evacuated or were rescued from their homes, 178 of whom took refuge at Red Cross shelters. A total of 75 homes and 80 trailers were severely damaged or destroyed.

All major streams in Tioga County exceeded their banks, including the Cowanesque and Tioga rivers. About 150 people throughout the county fled their homes due to rising water. Most roads in the county were flooded, including U.S. routes 6 and 15. A 0.5 mi (0.80 km) section of State Route 549 near Daggett was washed out, while two bridges along State Route 328 were damaged. An automotive dealership in Richmond Township suffered about $500,000 in losses after 60 cars were destroyed or severely damaged. A house burned down in Middlebury Township after flooding forced fire fighters to take 15 mi (24 km) worth of detours. In Clinton County, a few roads were closed due to flooding, while State Route 144 was shut down south of Renovo because of mudslides. Two boys were rescued from Kettle Creek. Similar flooding occurred in Union County. Along the Susquehanna River in Luzerne County, 15 to 20 farms were flooded, with an estimated $75,000 in damage to crops. At Shikellamy State Park, four docks and several boats at the marina were damaged, with some boats capsizing.

=== New York and New England ===
Beryl generally produced 1 to 3 in (25 to 76 mm) of rainfall throughout central and eastern New York, peaking at 4.28 in (109 mm) in Tully. The precipitation led to flash flooding in the Susquehanna and western Catskills regions of the state. Numerous streams and rivers overflowed their banks, resulting in extensive flood damage. Tioga, Steuben, and Chemung counties were the hardest hit areas. In Chemung County, damage from the storm is estimated at $5 million, over half of which was within the town of Southport. Several bridges and over 25 homes were damaged; between 60 and 70 residents in the county were forced to evacuate. Beryl's remnants inflicted $650,000 in municipal damage to Steuben County, where one man was rescued from flood waters by a local fire department. Tioga County received $1.5 million in damage; a woman in the town of Tioga drowned after she attempted to leave her stranded vehicle. Another death occurred in the state after a 2-year-old girl fell into the Tioughnioga River near DeRuyter. At least 14 homes were damaged in Otsego County; seven highways sustained severe damage, including portions of New York State Route 7, which was forced to close for several hours. Elsewhere in the state, flood waters reached 2 to 3 ft (0.61 to 0.91 m) in some locations, with roads and basements throughout the region flooded. Damage in New York totaled $12 million. Light to moderate rainfall extended into much of southern and central New England, particularly throughout portions of Connecticut and Massachusetts. The precipitation peaked at 5.39 in (137 mm) in West Hartford, Connecticut.

== See also ==
- Other tropical cyclones named Beryl
- List of Florida hurricanes
- Timeline of the 1994 Atlantic hurricane season
- List of North Carolina hurricanes (1980–present)
- Hurricane Earl (1998)
- Tropical Storm Barry (2001)
