= New York State Route 328 =

State highway in Chemung County, New York, US

New York State Route 328
- Map of the Southern Tier with NY 328 highlighted in red

Route information
- Maintained by NYSDOT
- Length: 6.15 mi (9.90 km)
- Existed: 1930–present

Major junctions
- South end: PA 328 at the Pennsylvania state line in Southport
- North end: NY 14 in Southport

Location
- Country: United States
- State: New York
- Counties: Chemung

Highway system
- New York Highways; Interstate; US; State; Reference; Parkways
← NY 327	→ NY 329

New York State Route 328 (NY 328) is a northeast–southwest state highway located entirely within the town of Southport in Chemung County, New York, in the United States. The northeast end of NY 328 is at an intersection with NY 14 in the community of Southport, and the southwest terminus is at the Pennsylvania state line, where NY 328 continues on as Pennsylvania Route 328 (PA 328). NY 328 parallels Seeley Creek, a tributary of the Chemung River, for its entire length. The entirety of the 6.15-mile (9.90 km) route is part of Corridor U of the Appalachian Development Highway System.

== Route description ==
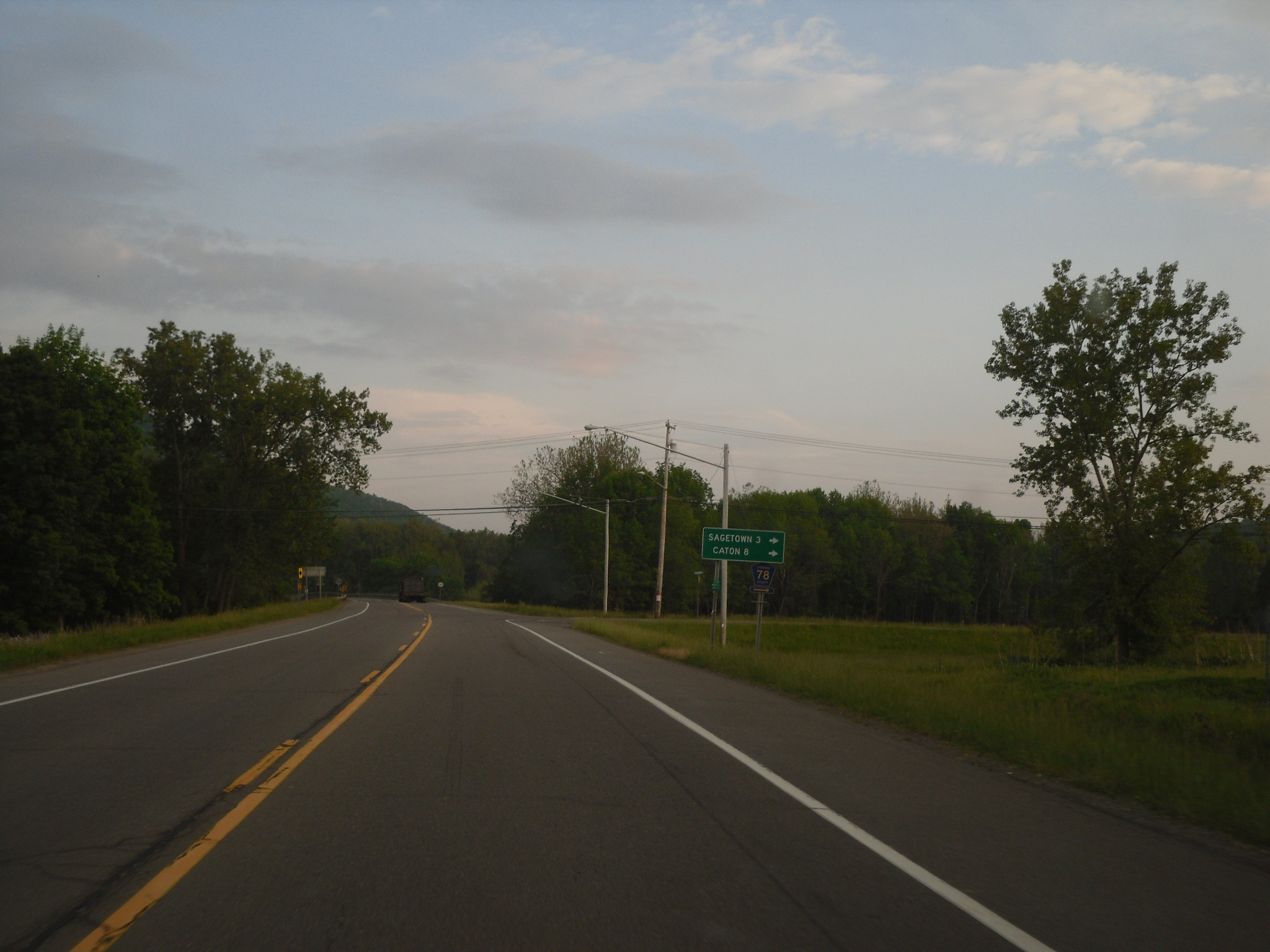
NY 328 at the junction with CR 78 in Southport

NY 328 picks up where PA 328 leaves off at the Pennsylvania state line in the southwestern Chemung County town of Southport. The route heads northeast, roughly paralleling Seeley Creek as it runs along the base of a large valley surrounding the waterway. After three-fifths of a mile (1.0 km), the route veers to the north as a super two, crossing the creek, while the roadway along the southern edge of Seeley Creek becomes County Route 69 (CR 69). NY 328 intersects CR 78 shortly afterward.

The route continues along the western base of the valley, bypassing both Webb Mills and Pine City as it continues to parallel both CR 69 and Seeley Creek. Near Pine City, NY 328 intersects CR 69, now named Pennsylvania Avenue, once more. Here, NY 328 transitions from a two-lane roadway to a four-lane divided highway, a configuration that remains in place for the final 3 miles (5 km) of the route. NY 328 continues along a narrow strip of land situated in the center of the valley between CR 69 and Seeley Creek to the hamlet of Southport, where it terminates at NY 14. At this point, NY 14 leaves Broadway and turns east onto the Clemens Center Parkway, the eastward and northward continuation of NY 328 into Elmira.

All of NY 328 is part of Corridor U of the Appalachian Development Highway System. The corridor continues south into Pennsylvania on PA 328 and U.S. Route 15 to Williamsport, Pennsylvania, and north along NY 14 to the Southern Tier Expressway (Interstate 86 and NY 17) in Horseheads.

== History ==
When NY 328 was assigned as part of the 1930 renumbering of state highways in New York, it began on Sagetown Road at the Steuben–Chemung county line and followed Sagetown Road east to the hamlet of Seeley Creek. At Seeley Creek, NY 328 turned north to follow Pennsylvania Avenue into Elmira, where it ended at NY 14. At the same time, a connector between NY 328 at Seeley Creek and then-PA 549 at the Pennsylvania state line was designated NY 328A. Over the next few years, NY 328 was extended northward to Horseheads in stages, beginning with an extension along Broadway and Walnut Street to a new terminus at Water Street (NY 13 and NY 17E) by 1932.

NY 13 and NY 17E were moved one block northward onto Church Street c. 1934. Around the same time, NY 328 was extended north to then-NY 17 in Horseheads by way of Church Street, Davis Street, Oakwood Avenue, and Corning Road between Elmira and Horseheads. It was altered slightly by 1938 to follow a more easterly alignment through Elmira via Broadway, Main Street, Park Place, College Avenue, and Thurston Street. The routing of NY 328 through the city was changed again by 1947 as the route was reconfigured to use Pennsylvania Avenue between Southport and Main Street and to bypass Thurston Street, Davis Street, and Oakwood Avenue on College Avenue. NY 14 was realigned c. 1974 to follow the routing of NY 328 from Elmira to Horseheads. NY 328 was truncated to its current northern terminus in Southport as a result.

To the south, NY 328 was rerouted south of Seeley Creek c. 1935 to connect directly to PA 549, replacing NY 328A. The former routing of NY 328 on Sagetown Road remained state maintained long after NY 328 had been realigned off of it. The roadway was designated NY 960D, an unsigned reference route; however, the route was turned over to the county by 1993 and is now CR 78. In the 1960s, NY 328 was realigned between Seeley Creek and Southport to follow a new roadway built to bypass the hamlets of Seeley Creek, Webb Mills, and Pine City. The realignment coincided with the designation of the route as part of Corridor U of the Appalachian Development Highway System in 1965. The former alignment of NY 328 between Seeley Creek and Southport is now CR 69.

== Major intersections ==
The entire route is in Southport, Chemung County.

mi	km	Destinations	Notes
0.00	0.00	PA 328 west – Millerton, Mosherville	Continuation into Pennsylvania
1.07	1.72	CR 78 – Sagetown, Caton	Hamlet of Seeley Creek; former routing of NY 328
6.15	9.90	NY 14 (Pennsylvania Avenue / Broadway)	Northern terminus; hamlet of Southport
1.000 mi = 1.609 km; 1.000 km = 0.621 mi

== See also ==
- List of county routes in Chemung County, New York
