= Jackson Township, Tioga County, Pennsylvania =

Township in Pennsylvania, US

Coordinates: 41°57′38″N 76°58′15″W

- Township
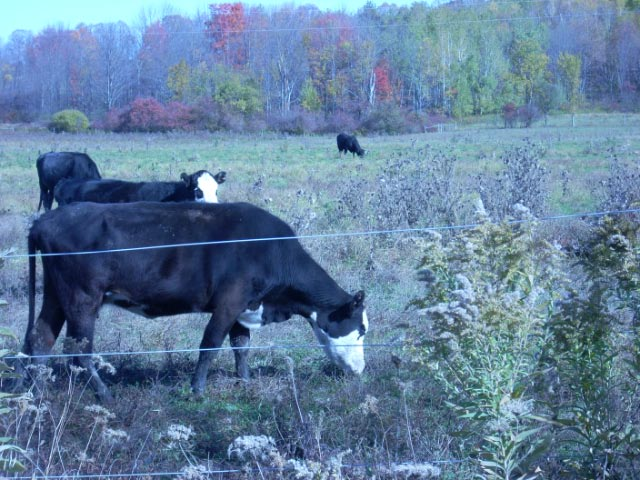
- A Jackson Township pasture

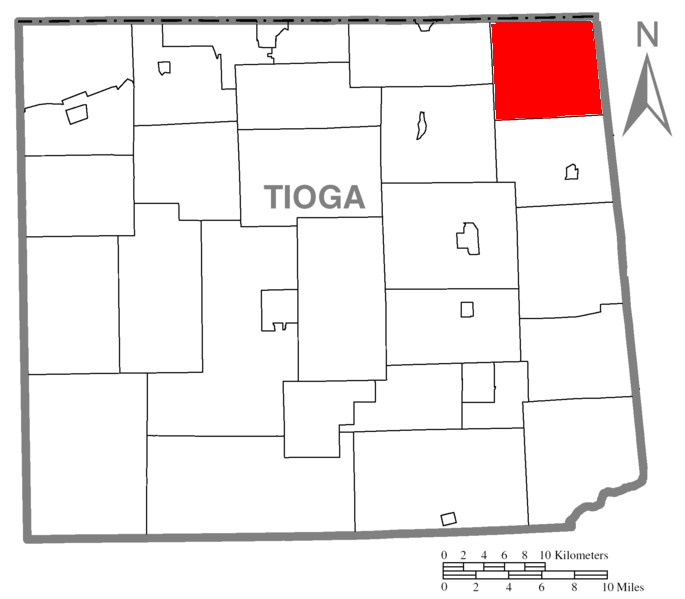
- Map of Tioga County Highlighting Jackson Township

- Map of Pennsylvania highlighting Tioga County
- Country: United States
- State: Pennsylvania
- County: Tioga
- Settled: 1800
- Incorporated: 1815

Area
  - Total: 40.14 sq mi (103.95 km^{2})
  - Land: 40.11 sq mi (103.88 km^{2})
  - Water: 0.027 sq mi (0.07 km^{2})

Population (2020)
  - Total: 1,882 ▼
  - Estimate (2023): 1,866
  - Density: 46.5/sq mi (17.97/km^{2})
- Time zone: Eastern Time Zone (North America)
  - Summer (DST): EDT
- FIPS code: 42-117-37472

Historical population
Census	Pop.	Note	%±
2000	2,054		—
2010	1,887		−8.1%
2020	1,882		−0.3%
2023 (est.)	1,866		−0.9%
U.S. Decennial Census

Jackson Township is a township in Tioga County, Pennsylvania, United States. The population was 1,882 at the 2020 census.

== Geography ==
According to the United States Census Bureau, the township has a total area of 40.6 square miles (105 km^{2}), of which 40.6 square miles (105 km^{2}) is land and 0.04 square miles (0.10 km^{2}) (0.10%) is water.

Jackson Township is bordered by the Towns of Caton in Steuben County, New York and Southport in Chemung County, New York to the north, Wells Township in Bradford County to the east, Rutland Township to the south and Tioga and Lawrence Townships to the west.

== Demographics ==
As of the census of 2000, there were 2,054 people, 777 households, and 599 families residing in the township. The population density was 50.6 inhabitants per square mile (19.5/km^{2}). There were 879 housing units at an average density of 21.7/sq mi (8.4/km^{2}). The racial makeup of the township was 98.64% White, 0.29% African American, 0.10% Native American, 0.10% Asian, 0.05% from other races, and 0.83% from two or more races. Hispanic or Latino of any race were 0.29% of the population.

There were 777 households, out of which 32.8% had children under the age of 18 living with them, 66.9% were married couples living together, 6.0% had a female householder with no husband present, and 22.8% were non-families. 19.3% of all households were made up of individuals, and 8.8% had someone living alone who was 65 years of age or older. The average household size was 2.58 and the average family size was 2.95.

In the township the population was spread out, with 24.3% under the age of 18, 7.8% from 18 to 24, 26.9% from 25 to 44, 26.9% from 45 to 64, and 14.0% who were 65 years of age or older. The median age was 40 years. For every 100 females, there were 101.4 males. For every 100 females age 18 and over, there were 99.7 males.

The median income for a household in the township was $33,643, and the median income for a family was $38,813. Males had a median income of $30,882 versus $21,210 for females. The per capita income for the township was $15,201. About 8.0% of families and 11.1% of the population were below the poverty line, including 13.6% of those under age 18 and 7.0% of those age 65 or over.

== Communities and locations ==
- Daggett – A village on Pennsylvania Route 549 in the eastern part of the township.
- Jackson Center – A village located in the south-central part of the township.
- Jackson Summit – A village on Pennsylvania Route 328 in the western part of the township.
- Jobs Corners – A village on Pennsylvania Route 549 in the southeast part of the township.
- Millerton – A village and census-designated place on Pennsylvania Route 328 in the northeastern part of the township.
- Trowbridge – A village on Pennsylvania Route 328 in the central part of the township, a few miles southwest of Millerton.
