= Pennsylvania Route 328 =

State highway in Pennsylvania, US

Pennsylvania Route 328

Route information
- Maintained by PennDOT
- Length: 13.228 mi (21.288 km)
- Existed: 1961–present

Major junctions
- West end: PA 287 in Tioga Junction
- PA 549 in Wells Township
- East end: NY 328 near Millerton

Location
- Country: United States
- State: Pennsylvania
- Counties: Tioga, Bradford

Highway system
- Pennsylvania State Route System; Interstate; US; State; Scenic; Legislative
| ← PA 327 | → PA 329 |

Pennsylvania Route 328 (PA 328, designated by the Pennsylvania Department of Transportation as SR 328) is a 13.2-mile-long (21.2 km) state highway located in Tioga and Bradford counties in Pennsylvania. The western terminus is at PA 287 in Tioga Junction. The eastern terminus is at New York State Route 328 (NY 328) at the New York state line near Millerton.

== Route description ==
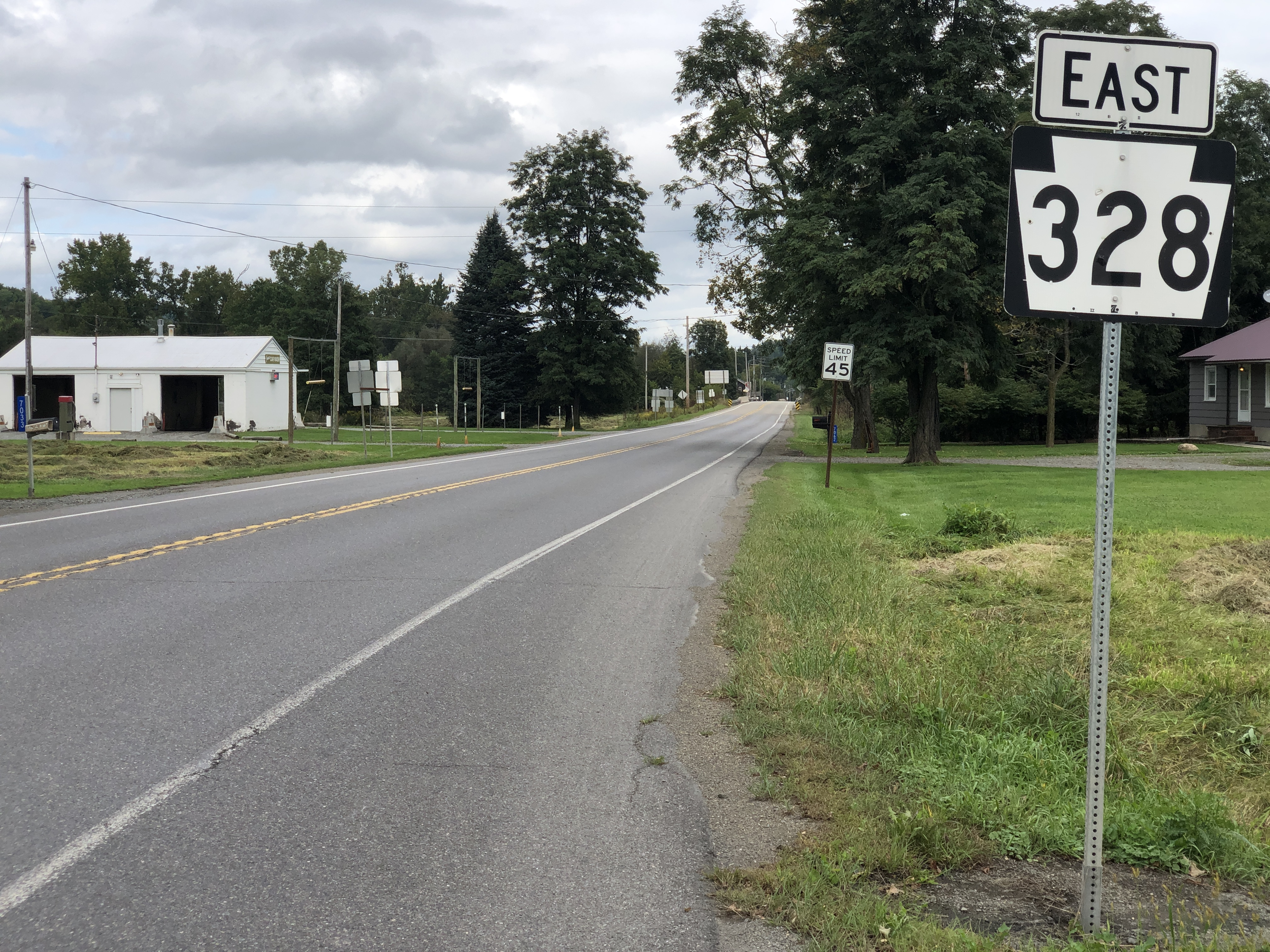
PA 328 eastbound after the fork with PA 549 in Wells Township

PA 328 begins at an intersection in Tioga Junction with PA 287. The route progresses eastward as a residential road through Tioga Junction, turning southeastward after Hillside Terrace. After this curve, PA 328 leaves Tioga Junction a two-lane local road through woodlands. The road curves several times from east, southeast and northeast directions before maintaining a southeastward at a field near Burrows Hollow Road. After Lyman Stone Road, PA 328 turning southeastward through forests and fields before curving eastward through fields. At the intersection with Button Hill Road, PA 328 turns to the northeast into Jackson Summit. Starting in Jackson Summit, the route parallels the former right-of-way of the Erie Railroad's Tioga Division, serving as a residential highway through Jackson Summit. At the intersection with Hudson Hill Road, PA 328 turns to the east entering the hamlet of Trowbridge, where it passes to the south of the former Trowbridge station.

After the hamlet of Trowbridge, PA 328 remains a rural highway, turning to the northeast through the fields in the area. After the intersection with Alder Run Road, the highway becomes residential for a short stretch. Soon after, the route enters the census-designated place of Millerton and gains the name of Main Street. PA 328 passes a mix of commercial businesses and residential homes until leaving Millerton after the intersection with Bly Road. The route remains known as Main Street for a short distance, changing names to Hammond Creek Road upon crossing the county line into Bradford County. PA 328 enters Wells Township progressing to the northeast of the hamlet of Mosherville. In the area north of Mosherville, PA 549 intersects with PA 328 and terminates. There, PA 328 takes the right-of-way from PA 549 and progresses northeast to the New York state line, where the designation terminates. The road continues northward as NY 328.

== Major intersections ==
| County | Location | mi | km | Destinations | Notes |
|---|---|---|---|---|---|
| Tioga | Tioga Township | 0.000 | 0.000 | PA 287 – Mansfield, Corning | Western terminus of PA 328 |
| Bradford | Wells Township | 12.827 | 20.643 | PA 549 south – Mosherville | Northern terminus of PA 549 |
| Bradford | Wells Township | 13.228 | 21.288 | NY 328 north (Pennsylvania Avenue) – Elmira | New York state line; eastern terminus of PA 328 |
1.000 mi = 1.609 km; 1.000 km = 0.621 mi
