= SR556 =

SR556 may refer to:

- Ruger SR-556, a firearm
- State Road or Route 556
