= List of highways numbered 549 =

Route 549, or Highway 549, may refer to:

== Canada ==
- Alberta Highway 549
- Manitoba Provincial Road 549
- Ontario Highway 549

== United Kingdom ==
- A549 road
- London Buses route 549

== United States ==
- AR 549
- SR 549
- LA 549
- MD 549
- CR 549
- NM 549
- PA 549
- Texas:
  - Loop 549
  - FM 549

Territories

- Puerto Rico Highway 549

Preceded by 548	Lists of highways 549	Succeeded by 550
