= Wells Township, Pennsylvania =

Wells Township is the name of two places in the U.S. state of Pennsylvania:

- Wells Township, Bradford County, Pennsylvania
- Wells Township, Fulton County, Pennsylvania
