= Lawrence Township, Pennsylvania =

Lawrence Township is the name of some places in the U.S. state of Pennsylvania:

- Lawrence Township, Clearfield County, Pennsylvania
- Lawrence Township, Tioga County, Pennsylvania
