= List of highways numbered 551 =

The following highways are numbered 551:

== Canada ==
- Highway 551

== Finland ==
- National Highway 551 (Finland)

== Korea, South ==
- Jungang Expressway Branch

== Norway ==
- Norwegian National Road 551

== United States ==
- County Route 551 (New Jersey)
- County Route 551 ((Erie County, New York))
- Ohio State Route 551
- Oregon Route 551
- Pennsylvania Route 551
- Puerto Rico Highway 551

Preceded by 550	Lists of highways 551	Succeeded by 552
