= List of highways numbered 547 =

The following highways are numbered 547:

== United States ==
- LA 547
- MD 547
- PA 547
- PR-547
- FM 547
- SR 547

Preceded by 546	Lists of highways 547	Succeeded by 548
