= List of highways numbered 550 =

The following highways are numbered 550:

== Canada ==
- Alberta Highway 550
- New Brunswick Route 550
- Ontario Highway 550
  - Ontario Highway 550B
- Quebec Autoroute 550 (unbuilt)

== Turkey ==
- D.550

== United States ==
- US 550
- Route 550
- MD 550
- CR 550
  - CR 550 Spur
- SR 550
- PA 550
- PR-550
- SH 550 (under construction)

Preceded by 549	Lists of highways 550	Succeeded by 551
