= List of highways numbered 552 =

The following highways are numbered 552:

== Canada ==
- Alberta Highway 552
- Ontario Highway 552

== India ==
- National Highway 552 (India)

== United States ==
- SR 552
- SR 552
- MD 552
- CR 552
- SR 552
- PR-552

Preceded by 551	Lists of highways 552	Succeeded by 553
