= List of highways numbered 553 =

Route 553, or Highway 553, may refer to:

== Canada ==
- Ontario Highway 553

== Israel ==
- Route 553 (Israel)

== United States ==
- M-553
- CR 553
- CR 553
- PA 553
- PR-553

Preceded by 552	Lists of highways 553	Succeeded by 554
