= Rutland Township, Pennsylvania =

Township in Pennsylvania, US

Coordinates: 41°52′00″N 77°00′59″W

- Township
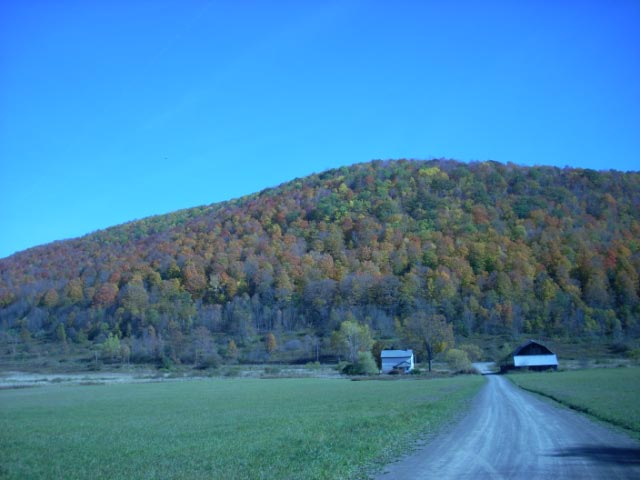
- A Rutland Township farm

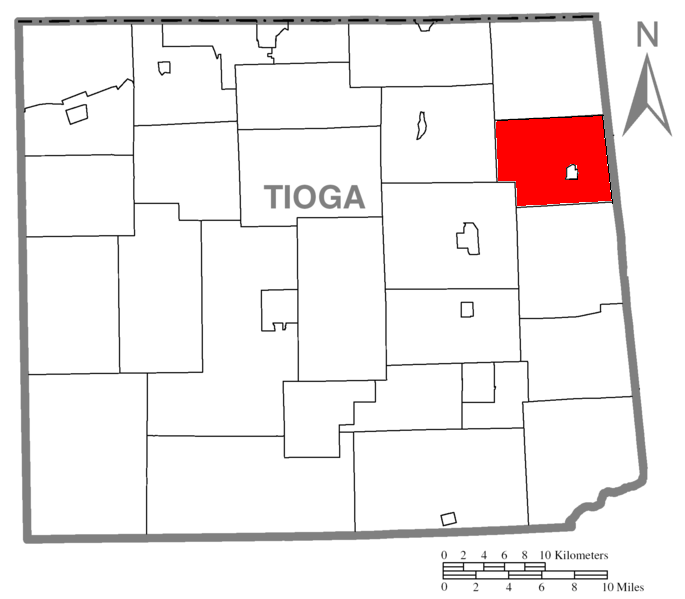
- Map of Tioga County Highlighting Rutland Township

- Map of Pennsylvania highlighting Tioga County
- Country: United States
- State: Pennsylvania
- County: Tioga
- Settled: 1806
- Incorporated: 1828

Area
  - Total: 36.31 sq mi (94.03 km^{2})
  - Land: 36.29 sq mi (93.99 km^{2})
  - Water: 0.015 sq mi (0.04 km^{2})

Population (2020)
  - Total: 775 ▼
  - Estimate (2023): 769
  - Density: 22.9/sq mi (8.84/km^{2})
- Time zone: Eastern Time Zone (North America)
  - Summer (DST): EDT
- FIPS code: 42-117-66912

Historical population
Census	Pop.	Note	%±
2000	736		—
2010	805		9.4%
2020	775		−3.7%
2023 (est.)	769		−0.8%
U.S. Decennial Census

Rutland Township is a township in Tioga County, Pennsylvania, United States. The population was 775 at the 2020 census.

== Geography ==
According to the United States Census Bureau, the township has a total area of 35.4 square miles (91.7 km^{2}), of which 35.4 square miles (91.7 km^{2}) is land and 0.03% is water.

Rutland Township is bordered by Jackson Township to the north, Wells and Columbia Townships in Bradford County to the east, Sullivan Township to the south, Richmond Township to the south and west, and Tioga Township to the west.

== Demographics ==
As of the census of 2000, there were 736 people, 270 households, and 207 families residing in the township. The population density was 20.8 people per square mile (8.0/km^{2}). There were 347 housing units at an average density of 9.8/sq mi (3.8/km^{2}). The racial makeup of the township was 98.78% White, 0.41% African American, 0.54% Native American, and 0.27% from two or more races.

There were 270 households, out of which 33.3% had children under the age of 18 living with them, 70.0% were married couples living together, 3.7% had a female householder with no husband present, and 23.3% were non-families. 20.0% of all households were made up of individuals, and 7.4% had someone living alone who was 65 years of age or older. The average household size was 2.63 and the average family size was 2.97.

In the township the population was spread out, with 24.2% under the age of 18, 5.2% from 18 to 24, 28.0% from 25 to 44, 26.4% from 45 to 64, and 16.3% who were 65 years of age or older. The median age was 41 years. For every 100 females, there were 101.6 males. For every 100 females age 18 and over, there were 101.4 males.

The median income for a household in the township was $35,368, and the median income for a family was $37,054. Males had a median income of $29,167 versus $19,500 for females. The per capita income for the township was $16,125. About 7.9% of families and 7.1% of the population were below the poverty line, including 4.7% of those under age 18 and 8.9% of those age 65 or over.

== Communities and locations ==
- Lawrence Corners – A village on Pennsylvania Route 549 in the western part of the township.
- Roseville – A very small borough on Pennsylvania Route 549 in the central part of the township.
