= Timeline of the 1994 Atlantic hurricane season =

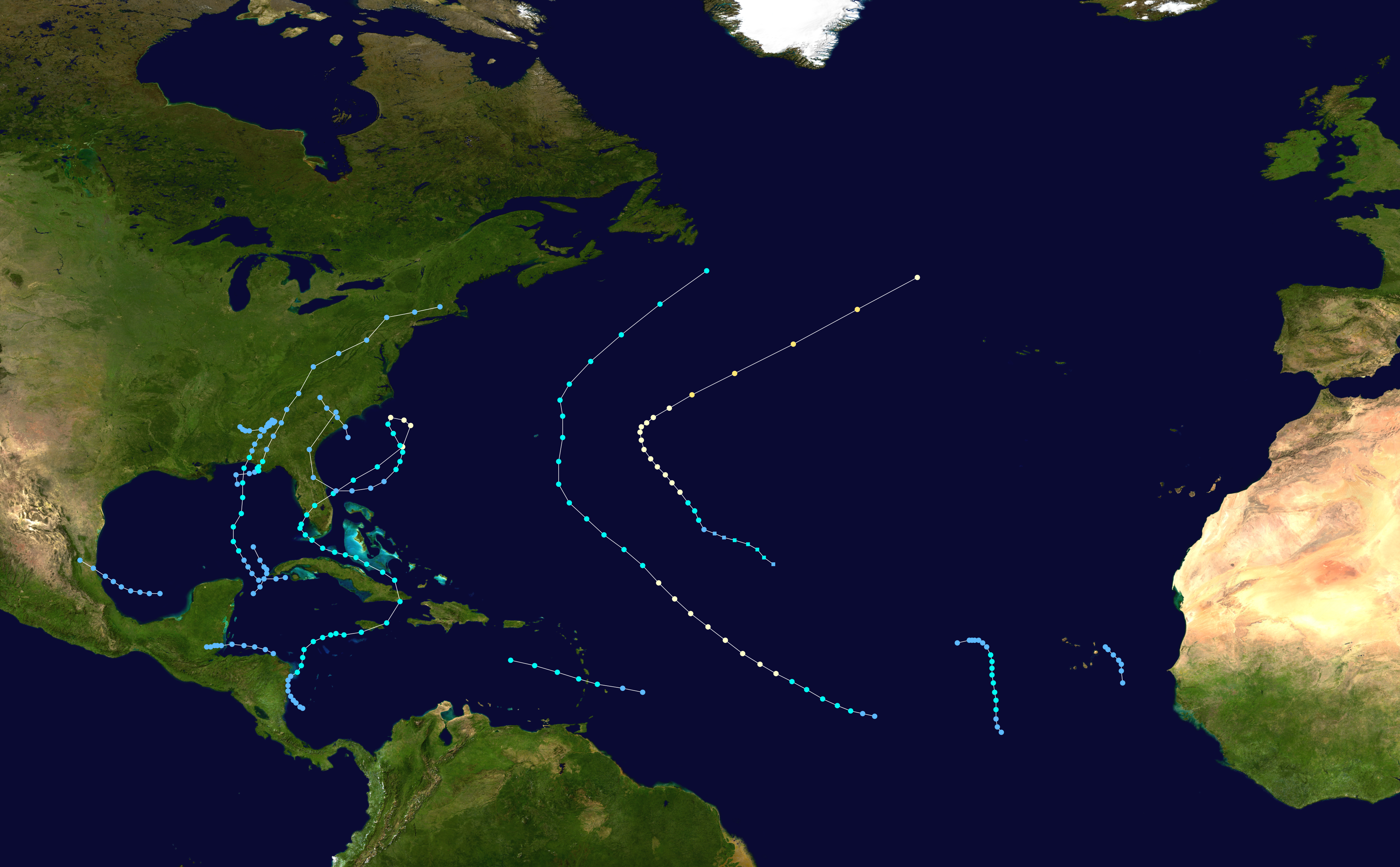
- Season summary map

Season boundaries
- First system formed: June 30, 1994
- Last system dissipated: November 21, 1994

Strongest system
- Name: Florence
- Maximum winds: 110 mph (175 km/h) (1-minute sustained)
- Lowest pressure: 972 mbar (hPa; 28.7 inHg)

Longest lasting system
- Name: Gordon
- Duration: 13.5 days
Storm articles
- Tropical Storm Alberto (1994)
- Tropical Storm Beryl (1994)
- Tropical Storm Debby (1994)
- Hurricane Gordon (1994)

The 1994 Atlantic hurricane season was a below-average Atlantic hurricane season that produced seven named tropical cyclones. The season officially began on June 1 and ended on November 30, dates which conventionally limit the period of each year when tropical cyclones tend to form in the Atlantic. The first named storm, Tropical Storm Alberto, formed on June 30. The last storm of the season, Hurricane Gordon, dissipated on November 21. This season produced seven named storms; three attained hurricane status, though none became a major hurricane, a storm that ranks as a Category 3 or higher on the Saffir-Simpson Hurricane Scale. Tropical Storm Alberto produced significant rainfall and flooding in the Southeastern United States, damaging or destroying over 18,000 homes, and inflicting $750 million (1994 USD) in damages. In August, Tropical Storm Beryl produced heavy rainfall in areas of Florida, Georgia, South Carolina, and North Carolina, with moderate to heavy rainfall throughout several other states. Beryl caused numerous injuries, many of which occurred from a tornado associated with the tropical storm. Tropical Storm Debby killed nine people throughout its path in September. Hurricane Gordon in November caused damages from Costa Rica to North Carolina in its six landfalls; extreme flooding and mudslides from the storm caused about 1,122 fatalities in Haiti.

This timeline documents tropical cyclone formations, strengthening, weakening, landfalls, extratropical transitions, and dissipations during the season. It includes information that was not released throughout the season, meaning that data from post-storm reviews by the National Hurricane Center, such as a storm that was not initially warned upon, has been included.

The time stamp for each event is stated using Coordinated Universal Time (UTC), the 24-hour clock where 00:00 = midnight UTC. and the time zone where the center of the tropical cyclone is currently located. The time zones utilized (east to west) prior to 2020 were: Atlantic, Eastern, and Central. In this timeline, the respective area time is included in parentheses. Additionally, figures for maximum sustained winds and position estimates are rounded to the nearest 5 units (miles, or kilometers), following National Hurricane Center practice. Direct wind observations are rounded to the nearest whole number. Atmospheric pressures are listed to the nearest millibar and nearest hundredth of an inch of mercury.

== Timeline ==
=== June ===
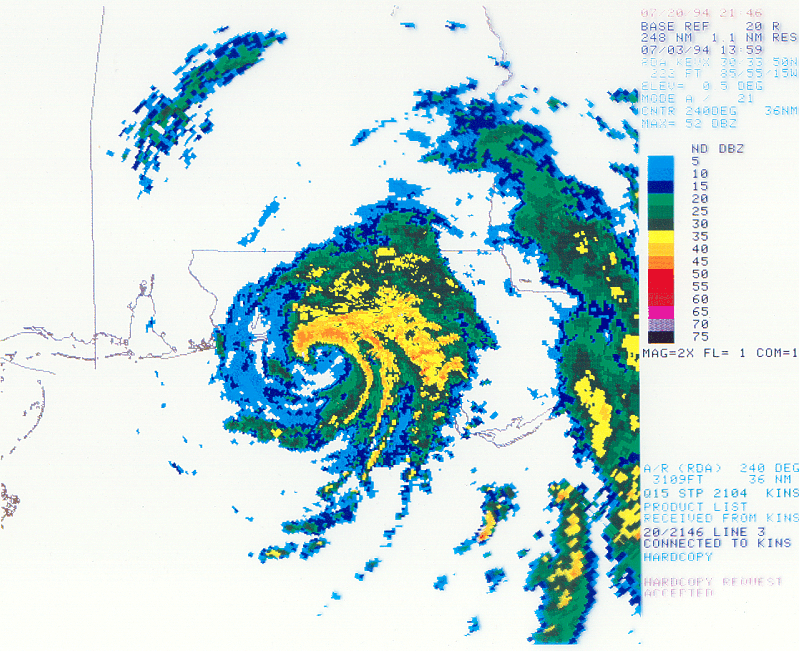
Radar image of Tropical Storm Alberto near landfall

June 1

- The Atlantic hurricane season officially begins.

June 30

- 2 a.m. EDT (0600 UTC) – Tropical Depression One forms 45 miles (75 km) (Note: The figures for maximum sustained winds and position estimates are rounded to the nearest 5 units (knots, miles, or kilometers), following the convention used in the National Hurricane Center's operational products for each storm. All other units are rounded to the nearest digit.) southeast of Guane, Cuba.

=== July ===
July 1

- 8 p.m. EDT (0000 UTC July 2) – Tropical Depression One strengthens into Tropical Storm Alberto.

July 3

- 11 a.m. EDT (1500 UTC) – Tropical Storm Alberto makes landfall near Destin, Florida with winds of 65 mph (100 km/h).
- 8 p.m. EDT (0000 UTC July 4) – Tropical Storm Alberto weakens to a tropical depression.

July 7

- 8 p.m. EDT (0000 UTC July 8) – Tropical Depression Alberto dissipates over central Alabama.

July 20

- 2 a.m. EDT (0600 UTC) – Tropical Depression Two forms 75 mi (120 km) southeast of Charleston, South Carolina.
- 10 a.m. EDT (1400 UTC) – Tropical Depression Two makes landfall near Georgetown, South Carolina with winds of 35 mph (55 km/h).

July 21

- 8 a.m. EDT (1200 UTC) – Tropical Depression Two dissipates over southern North Carolina.

=== August ===
August 14

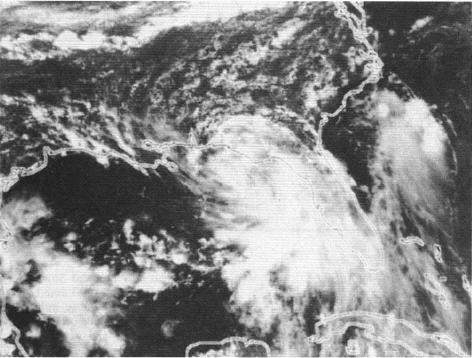
Tropical Depression Three on August 14

- 8 a.m. EDT (1200 UTC) – Tropical Depression Three forms 165 mi (265 km) southwest of Tallahassee, Florida.

August 15

- 8 a.m. EDT (1200 UTC) – Tropical Depression Three strengthens into Tropical Storm Beryl.
- 8 p.m. EDT (0000 UTC August 16) – Tropical Storm Beryl makes landfall near Panama City, Florida with winds of 60 mph (95 km/h).

August 16

- 8 a.m. EDT (1200 UTC) – Tropical Storm Beryl weakens to a tropical depression.
- 8 a.m. AST (1200 UTC) – Tropical Depression Four forms 1,020 mi (1,640 km) south-southwest of Brava, Cape Verde.
- 8 p.m. AST (0000 UTC August 17) – Tropical Depression Four strengthens into Tropical Storm Chris.

August 18

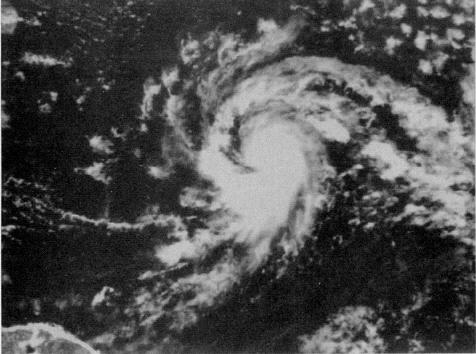
Tropical Storm Chris on August 17

- 2 a.m. AST (0600 UTC) – Tropical Storm Chris strengthens into a hurricane.

August 19

- 2 a.m. EDT (0600 UTC) – Tropical Depression Beryl dissipates over Connecticut as it is absorbed by a frontal trough.
- 8 a.m. EDT (1200 UTC) – Hurricane Chris reaches its peak intensity with winds of 80 mph (140 km/h) while located 570 mi (920 km) west-northwest of Barbuda.

August 20

- 2 a.m. EDT (0600 UTC) – Hurricane Chris weakens to a tropical storm.

August 23

- 8 p.m. EDT (0000 UTC August 24) – Tropical Storm Chris dissipates as it is merges with an extratropical cyclone southeast of Newfoundland.

August 29

- 7 a.m. CDT (1200 UTC) – Tropical Depression Five forms 220 mi (355 km) northeast of Veracruz, Mexico.

August 31

- 1 a.m. CDT (0600 UTC) – Tropical Depression Five makes landfall near Tampico, Mexico with winds of 35 mph (55 km/h).
- 1 p.m. CDT (1800 UTC) – Tropical Depression Five dissipates over the mountains of Mexico.

=== September ===
September 9

- 8 a.m. AST (1200 UTC) – Tropical Depression Six forms 175 mi (285 km) west of Barbados.
- 8 p.m. AST (0000 UTC) – Tropical Depression Six strengthens into Tropical Storm Debby.
- 11 p.m. AST (0300 UTC) – Tropical Storm Debby passes over the island of St. Lucia with winds of 65 mph (100 km/h).

September 11

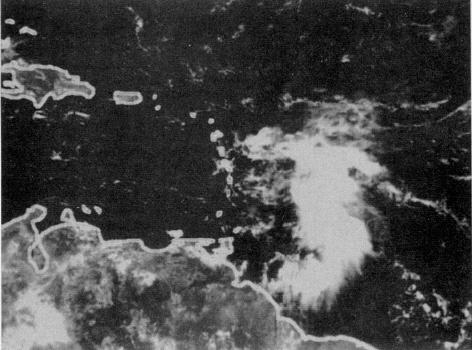
Tropical Storm Debby on September 9

- 2 a.m. AST (0600 UTC) – Tropical Storm Debby degenerates into a tropical wave in the eastern Caribbean Sea.

September 21

- 2 p.m. AST (1800 UTC) – Tropical Depression Seven forms 470 mi (760 km) southwest of Brava, Cape Verde.'

September 22

- 8 a.m. AST (1200 UTC) – Tropical Depression Seven strengthens into Tropical Storm Ernesto.

September 24

- 8 a.m. AST (1200 UTC) – Tropical Storm Ernesto weakens to a tropical depression.
- 8 a.m. EDT (1200 UTC) – Tropical Depression Eight forms 10 mi (15 km) north of the Honduras coastline.

September 25

- 2 p.m. EDT (1800 UTC) – Tropical Depression Eight makes landfall in southern Belize with winds of 35 mph (55 km/h).
- 8 p.m. AST (0000 UTC September 26) – Tropical Depression Ernesto dissipates over open waters.

September 26

- 2 p.m. EDT (1800 UTC) – Tropical Depression Eight dissipates over eastern Guatemala.

September 27

- 8 a.m. AST (1200 UTC) – Tropical Depression Nine forms 200 mi (320 km) southeast of Praia, Cape Verde.

September 28

- 8 p.m. AST (0000 UTC September 29) – Tropical Depression Nine dissipates near Sal, Cape Verde.

September 29

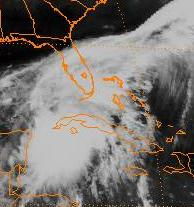
Tropical Depression Ten at peak intensity

- 2 a.m. EDT (0600 UTC) – Tropical Depression Ten forms 50 mi (85 km) east of Cozumel, Mexico.
- 8 p.m. EDT (0000 UTC September 30) - Tropical Depression Ten enters the Gulf of Mexico.

September 30

- 2 p.m. EDT (1800 UTC) – Tropical Depression Ten dissipates over open waters.

=== October ===
- No tropical cyclones developed during the month of October.

=== November ===
November 1

- 8 p.m. AST (0000 UTC November 2) – A subtropical depression forms 1,020 mi (1,640 km) northeast of Barbuda.

November 2

- 2 a.m. AST (0600 UTC) – The subtropical depression strengthens into a subtropical storm.

November 3

- 2 a.m. AST (0600 UTC) – The subtropical storm weakens to a subtropical depression.
- 2 p.m. AST (1800 UTC) – The subtropical depression gains enough tropical characteristics to be declared Tropical Depression Eleven.
- 8 p.m. AST (0000 UTC November 4) – Tropical Depression Eleven strengthens into Tropical Storm Florence.

November 4

- 2 p.m. AST (1800 UTC) – Tropical Storm Florence strengthens into a hurricane.

November 7

Hurricane Florence at peak intensity

- 2 p.m. AST (1800 UTC) – Hurricane Florence strengthens into a Category 2 hurricane.
- 8 p.m. AST (0000 UTC November 8) – Hurricane Florence reaches its peak intensity with winds of 110 mph (175 km/h) while located 900 mi (1,445 km) northeast of Bermuda.

November 8

- 8 a.m. EDT (1200 UTC) – Tropical Depression Twelve forms 100 mi (160 km) east of Bluefields, Nicaragua.
- 2 p.m. AST (1800 UTC) – Hurricane Florence weakens to a Category 1 hurricane.
- 8 p.m. AST (0000 UTC November 9) – Hurricane Florence dissipates as it is absorbed by an extratropical cyclone.

November 10

- 2 a.m. EDT (0600 UTC) – Tropical Depression Twelve makes landfall near Puerto Cabezas, Nicaragua with winds of 35 mph (55 km/h).
- 2 p.m. EDT (1800 UTC) – Tropical Depression Twelve strengthens into Tropical Storm Gordon.

November 12

- 11 p.m. EDT (0300 UTC November 13) – Tropical Storm Gordon makes landfall near Kingston, Jamaica with winds of 40 mph (65 km/h).

November 13

- 9 a.m. EDT (1300 UTC) – Tropical Storm Gordon makes landfall near Guantánamo Bay, Cuba with winds of 45 mph (75 km/h).

November 15

- 9 a.m. EDT (1300 UTC) – Tropical Storm Gordon makes landfall near Key West, Florida with winds of 50 mph (85 km/h).

November 16

- 9 a.m. EDT (1300 UTC) – Tropical Storm Gordon makes landfall near Fort Myers, Florida with winds of 50 mph (85 km/h).

November 17

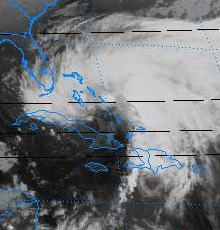
Tropical Storm Gordon on November 14

- 2 p.m. EDT (1800 UTC) – Tropical Storm Gordon strengthens into a hurricane.
- 8 p.m. EDT (0000 UTC November 18) – Hurricane Gordon reaches its peak intensity with winds of 85 mph (140 km/h) while located 225 mi (365 km) southeast of Wilmington, North Carolina.

November 18

- 2 p.m. EDT (1800 UTC) – Hurricane Gordon weakens to a tropical storm.

November 20

- 2 a.m. EDT (0600 UTC) – Tropical Storm Gordon weakens to a tropical depression.
- 11 p.m. EDT (0300 UTC) – Tropical Depression Gordon makes landfall near Cape Canaveral, Florida with winds of 30 mph (45 km/h).

November 21

- 8 p.m. EDT (0000 UTC November 22) – Tropical Depression Gordon dissipates over South Carolina.

November 30

- The Atlantic hurricane season officially ends.
