= Roseville, Pennsylvania =

Borough in Pennsylvania, US

- Borough
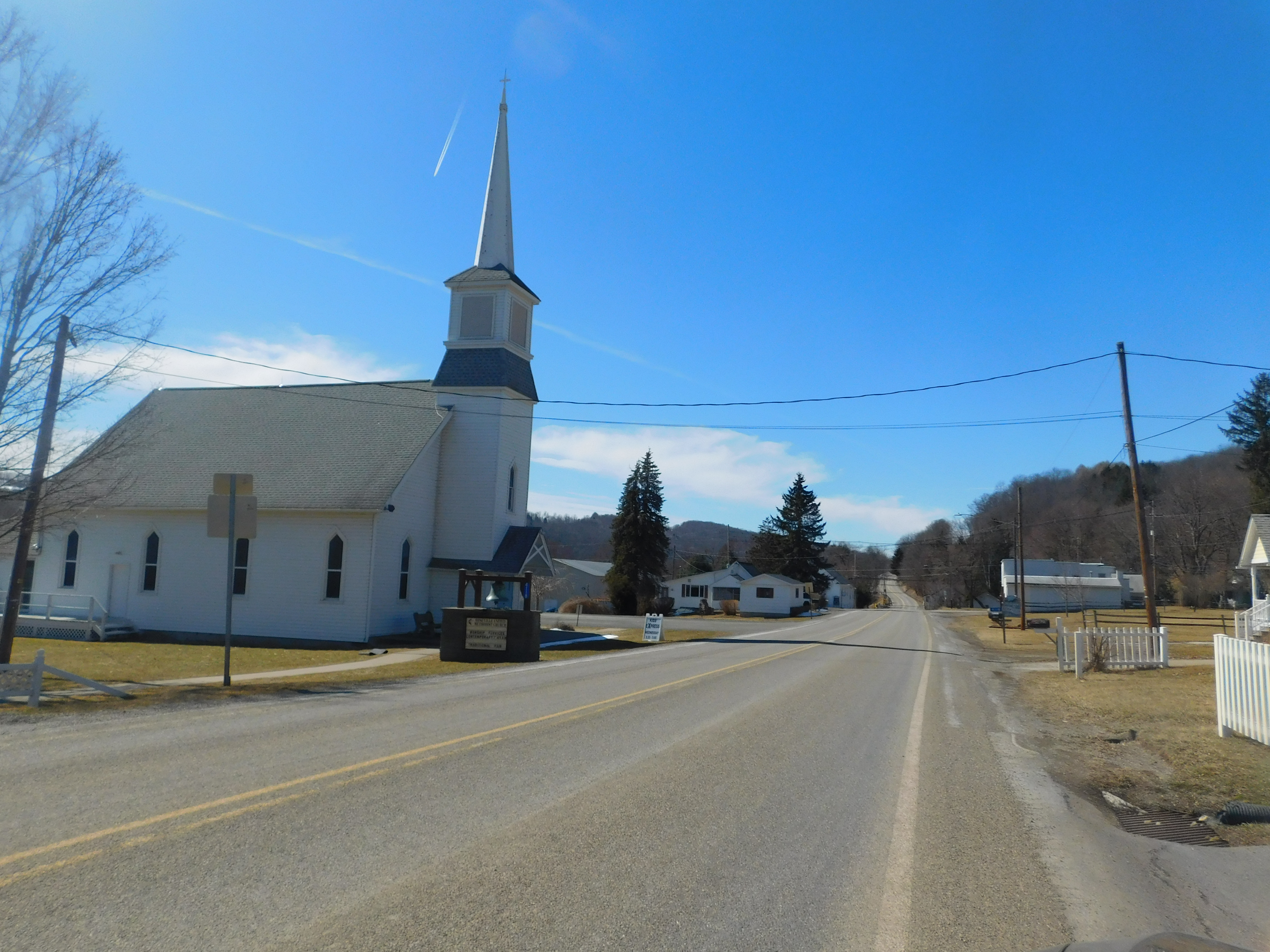
- PA 549 southbound through Roseville.

- Location of Roseville in Tioga County, Pennsylvania.

- Location within the U.S. state of Pennsylvania Roseville (the United States)
- Coordinates: 41°51′50″N 76°57′18″W
- Country: United States
- State: Pennsylvania
- County: Tioga
- Settled: 1806
- Incorporated (borough): 1876

Area
  - Total: 0.47 sq mi (1.23 km^{2})
  - Land: 0.47 sq mi (1.23 km^{2})
  - Water: 0 sq mi (0.00 km^{2})
- Elevation: 1,342 ft (409 m)

Population (2020)
  - Total: 178
  - Density: 374.4/sq mi (144.56/km^{2})
- Time zone: Eastern (EST)
  - Summer (DST): EDT
- Area code: 570
- FIPS code: 42-66232

Roseville is a borough in Tioga County, Pennsylvania, United States. The population was 177 at the 2020 census.

== History ==
Roseville was first settled by its namesake, Dr. William Rose in 1806. Dr. Rose migrated to Tioga County from Rutland, Vermont. He served as a frontier doctor for the citizens of eastern Tioga and western Bradford Counties. Rose built a distillery at Roseville in 1822, soon after his son, William Rose Jr., opened a tavern. The tavern quickly became the center of commerce in Roseville. The tavern was replaced by a hotel built to serve the needs to travelers between Mansfield and Elmira, New York.

Roseville was home to several businesses that served the needs of the people of Tioga County during the late 1800s and early 1900s. A gristmill was opened as was a cheese factory and a paint plant, but the principal form of business remained in the taverns along the highway. A devastating fire in 1888 destroyed 23 buildings in Roseville, thus ending the tavern era.

Roseville formerly had a post office and a public school. The post office, Rutland Post Office, was closed in 1957. The public school was closed in 1966 when Roseville's school system became part of the Mansfield school system, which later was consolidated into the Southern Tioga School District.

== Geography ==
Roseville is located at 41°51′51″N 76°57′34″W (41.864305, -76.959348).

According to the United States Census Bureau, the borough has a total area of 0.5 square miles (1.3 km^{2}), all land.

Roseville is surrounded by Rutland Township.

== Demographics ==
Historical population
Census	Pop.	Note	%±
1880	185		—
1890	211		14.1%
1900	215		1.9%
1920	119		—
1930	99		−16.8%
1940	133		34.3%
1950	126		−5.3%
1960	162		28.6%
1970	178		9.9%
1980	211		18.5%
1990	230		9.0%
2000	207		−10.0%
2010	189		−8.7%
2020	178		−5.8%
2021 (est.)	176	▼	−1.1%

As of the census of 2010, there were 189 people, 75 households, and 57 families residing in the borough. The population density was 390.0 inhabitants per square mile (150.6/km^{2}). There were 84 housing units at an average density of 158.3 per square mile (61.1/km^{2}). The racial makeup of the borough was 97.58% White, 0.48% Native American, 0.97% Asian, and 0.97% from two or more races. Hispanic or Latino of any race were 0.48% of the population.

There were 75 households, out of which 32.0% had children under the age of 18 living with them, 58.7% were married couples living together, 12.0% had a female householder with no husband present, and 22.7% were non-families. 16.0% of all households were made up of individuals, and 4.0% had someone living alone who was 65 years of age or older. The average household size was 2.76 and the average family size was 3.02.

In the borough the population was spread out, with 28.0% under the age of 18, 9.7% from 18 to 24, 23.2% from 25 to 44, 30.0% from 45 to 64, and 9.2% who were 65 years of age or older. The median age was 34 years. For every 100 females there were 99.0 males. For every 100 females age 18 and over, there were 86.3 males.

The median income for a household in the borough was $27,188, and the median income for a family was $24,821. Males had a median income of $31,500 versus $21,667 for females. The per capita income for the borough was $11,683. About 10.5% of families and 14.1% of the population were below the poverty line, including 28.8% of those under the age of eighteen and none of those 65 or over.

== Education ==
It is in the Southern Tioga School District.

== Religion ==
There are two churches located in Roseville: Roseville Methodist Church and the Independent Baptist Church.
