= List of highways numbered 555 =

The following highways are numbered 555:

== Canada ==
- Alberta Highway 555
- New Brunswick Route 555
- Ontario Highway 555 (former)

== United Kingdom ==
- A555 road

== United States ==
- I-555
- SR 555
- LA 555
- MD 555 (former)
- County Route 555 (New Jersey)
- SR 555
- PA 555
- PR-555
- SC 555
- Loop 555 (former)

Preceded by 554	Lists of highways 555	Succeeded by 556
