= List of highways numbered 546 =

The following highways are numbered 546:

== Canada ==
- Highway 546

== United States ==
- SR 546
- LA 546
- MD 546
- SR 546
- PA 546
- PR-546
- FM 546
- SR 546

Preceded by 545	Lists of highways 546	Succeeded by 547
