= List of highways numbered 554 =

Route 554, or Highway 554, may refer to:

== Canada ==
- Ontario Highway 554

== Israel ==
- Route 554 (Israel)

== United States ==
- LA 554
- M-554
- County Route 554 (New Jersey)
- SR 554
- PA 554
- PR-554

Preceded by 553	Lists of highways 554	Succeeded by 555
