= List of highways numbered 548 =

Route 548, or Highway 548, may refer to:

== Canada ==
- Ontario Highway 548

== India ==
- National Highway 548 (India)

== United States ==
- SR 548
- MS 548
- CR 548
- PR-548
- SR 548

== Vietnam ==
- Route 548, a hard-crusted dirt road that bisected the A Shau Valley lengthwise

Preceded by 547	Lists of highways 548	Succeeded by 549
