= Pennsylvania Route 549 =

State highway in Pennsylvania, US

Pennsylvania Route 549

Route information
- Maintained by PennDOT
- Length: 19.15 mi (30.82 km)
- Existed: 1928–present

Major junctions
- South end: US 6 in Richmond Township
- North end: PA 328 in Wells Township

Location
- Country: United States
- State: Pennsylvania
- Counties: Tioga, Bradford

Highway system
- Pennsylvania State Route System; Interstate; US; State; Scenic; Legislative
← PA 547	→ PA 550

Pennsylvania Route 549 (PA 549, designated by the Pennsylvania Department of Transportation as SR 549) is a 19.15-mile-long (30.82 km) state highway located in Tioga and Bradford counties in Pennsylvania. The southern terminus is at U.S. Route 6 (US 6) in Richmond Township near Mansfield. The northern terminus is at PA 328 in Wells Township. PA 549 was first designated in 1928 onto the current alignment from Richmond Township and US 6 to an intersection with then-PA 826 in Wells Township. This was changed in 1941 to extend to the New York state line nearby, but was extended and truncated twice between 1946 and 1961. In 1961, it was truncated to its current alignment.

== Route description ==
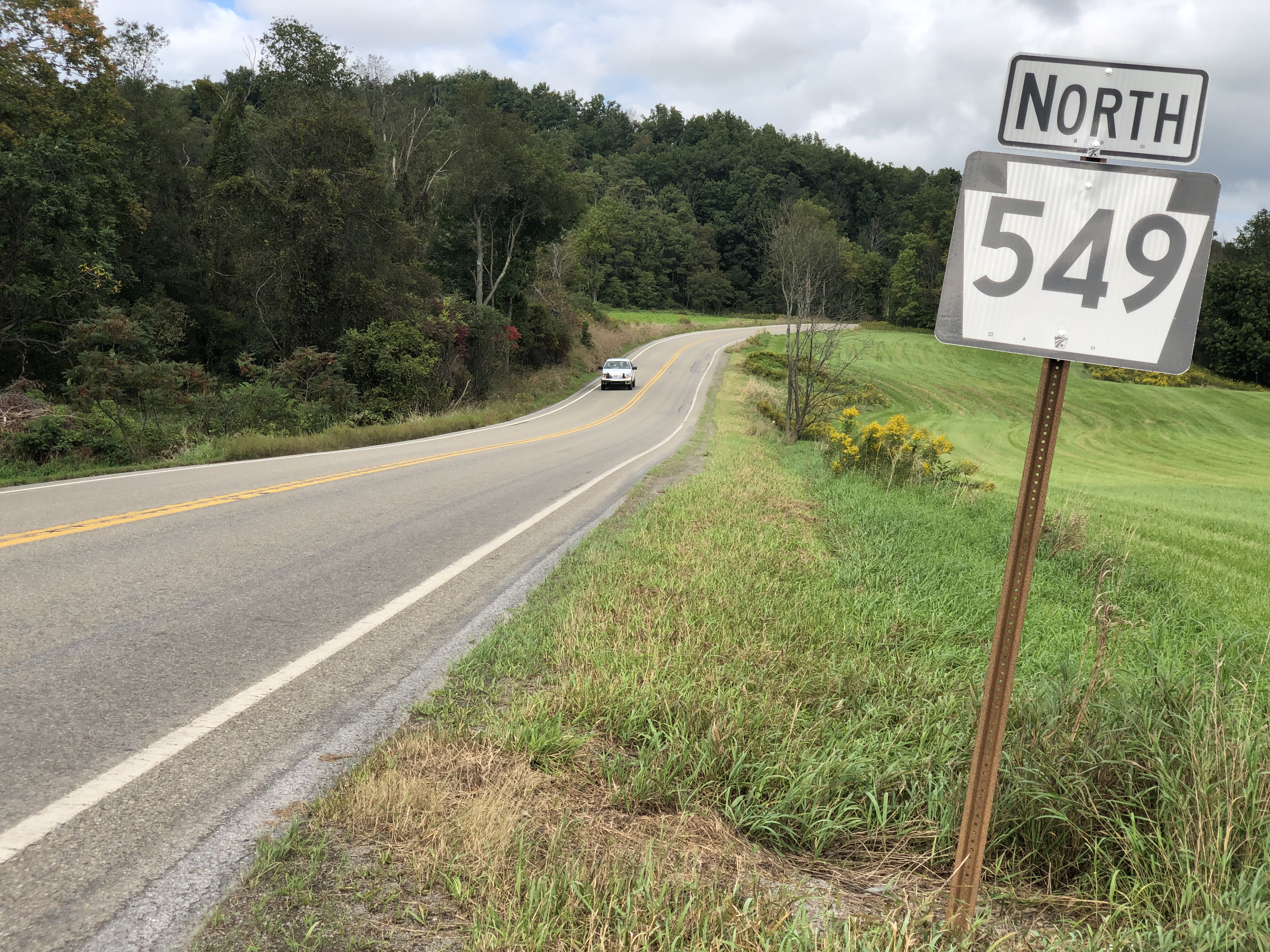
PA 549 northbound at Bailey Creek Road in Rutland Township

PA 549 begins at an intersection with US 6 (East Roosevelt Highway) just east of the borough of Mansfield in Richmond Township. The route progresses northeast as Roseville Road, crawling through farms for a distance until the intersection with Tickner Lane, where it curves north. Entering Rutland Township, PA 549 remains rural, curving eastward and soon southeastward into the borough of Roseville. Through Roseville, the road remains two-lane and passes residences and businesses before leaving just east of Pumpkin Hill Road. PA 549 forks to the northeast at an intersection with Sopertown Road, which heads into Bradford County and becomes State Route 4033. The highway parallels the Bradford County line for a distance, remaining primarily rural. After the intersection, PA 549 turns due north and soon to the northwest, entering the hamlet of Jobs Corners. Jobs Corners is small, with PA 549 passing some residences before turning to the northeast out of the hamlet. A short distance later, the highway enters Daggett and passes a small strip of buildings through downtown. The highway curves to the northwest at a gravel pit and turns northeastward once again, crossing the county line into Bradford County.

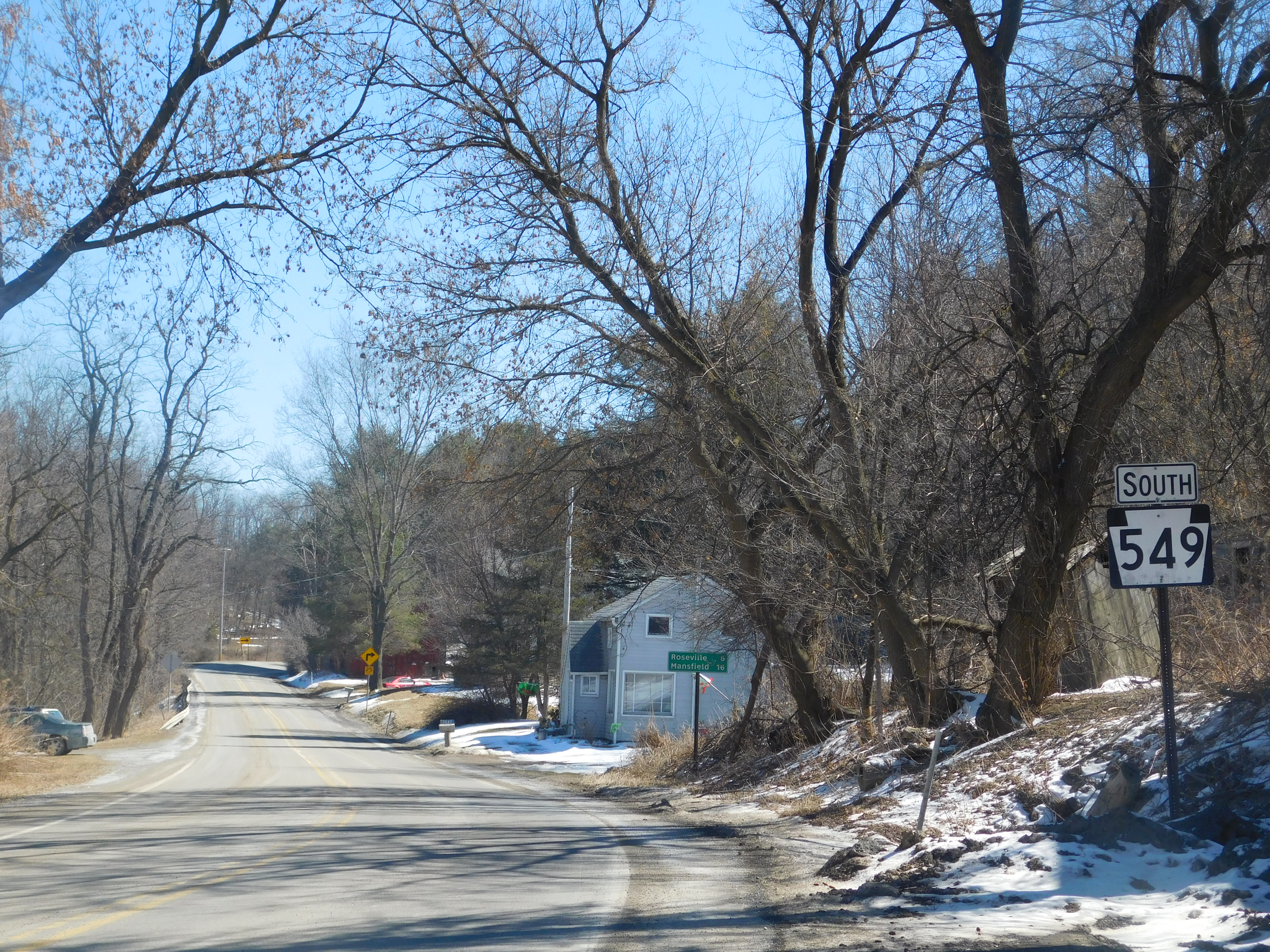
PA 549 southbound in Jobs Corners

After crossing the county line from Tioga County, PA 549 immediately enters the hamlet of Mosherville. Through the hamlet, the highway turns northeastward, passing some residences to the northern end and turning northward after the intersection with School Street. PA 549 begins a short parallel with Hammond Creek, before crossing over north of Mosherville. Continuing through Wells Township, PA 549 intersects with Farm View Road and soon merges in with PA 328 (Hammond Creek Road) just south of the New York state line. This junction serves as the northern terminus for PA 549.

== History ==
PA 549 was first designated from the intersection with US 6 to an intersection with then PA 826 in Wells Township during the numbering of state highways in Pennsylvania in 1928. This remained in place for 13 years, until PA 549 was extended to the Pennsylvania/New York state line along old PA 826. Five years later, in 1946, PA 549 was truncated once again in place of now PA 84 in Wells Township. In 1951, five years after the truncation, PA 549 was moved back to the Pennsylvania/New York state line. This extension lasted only ten years, as PA 549 was truncated back for the final time now to PA 328 in 1961.

== Major intersections ==
County	Location	mi	km	Destinations	Notes
Tioga	Richmond Township	0.00	0.00	US 6 (East Roosevelt Highway) – Troy, Mansfield	Southern terminus of PA 549
Bradford	Wells Township	19.15	30.82	PA 328 (Hammond Creek Road) – Elmira, Millerton	Northern terminus of PA 549
1.000 mi = 1.609 km; 1.000 km = 0.621 mi
