= Tioga Township, Tioga County, Pennsylvania =

Township in Pennsylvania, US

Coordinates: 41°55′00″N 77°07′59″W

Tioga Township, Pennsylvania
- Township
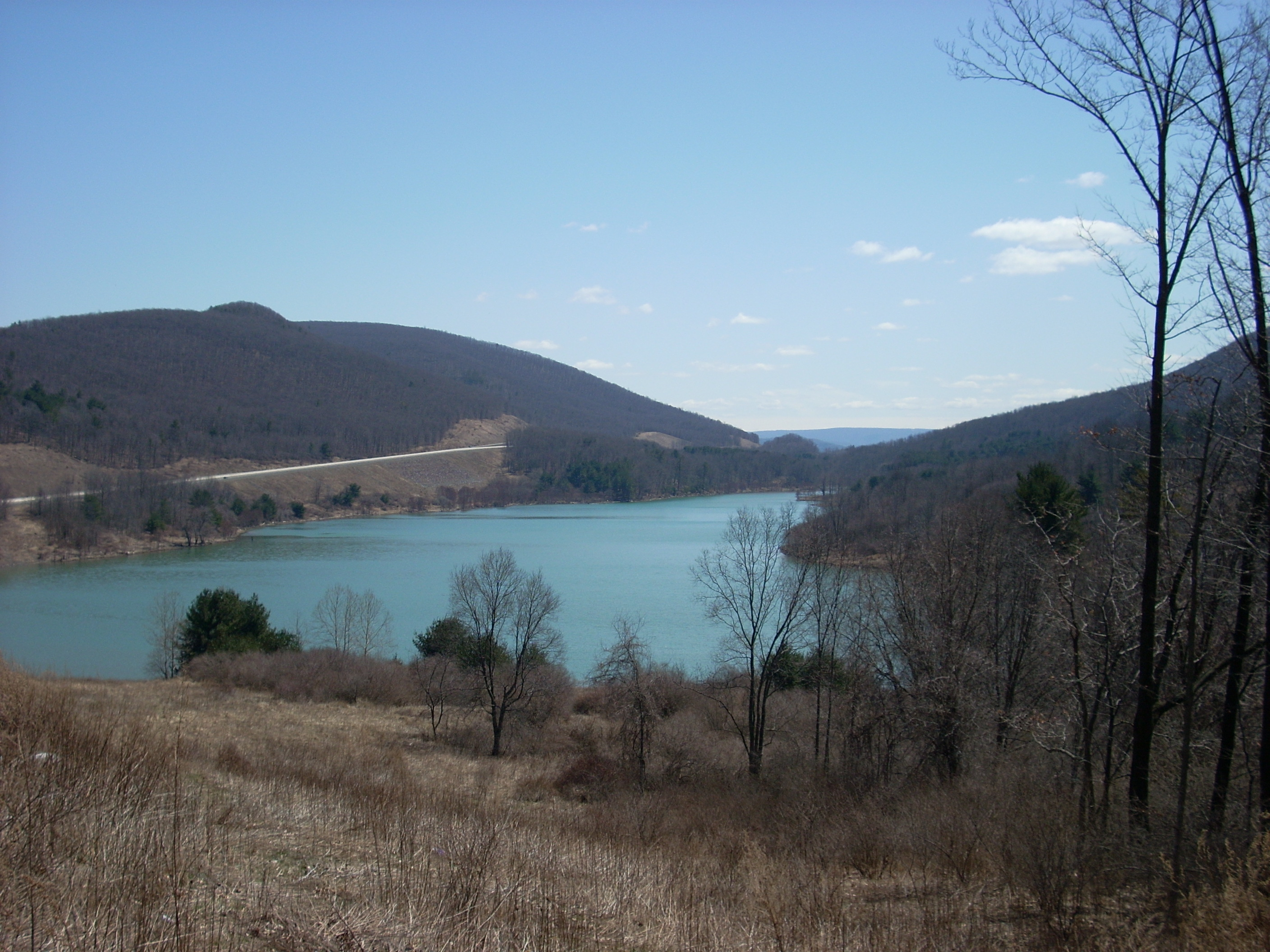
- Tioga Reservoir in Tioga Township

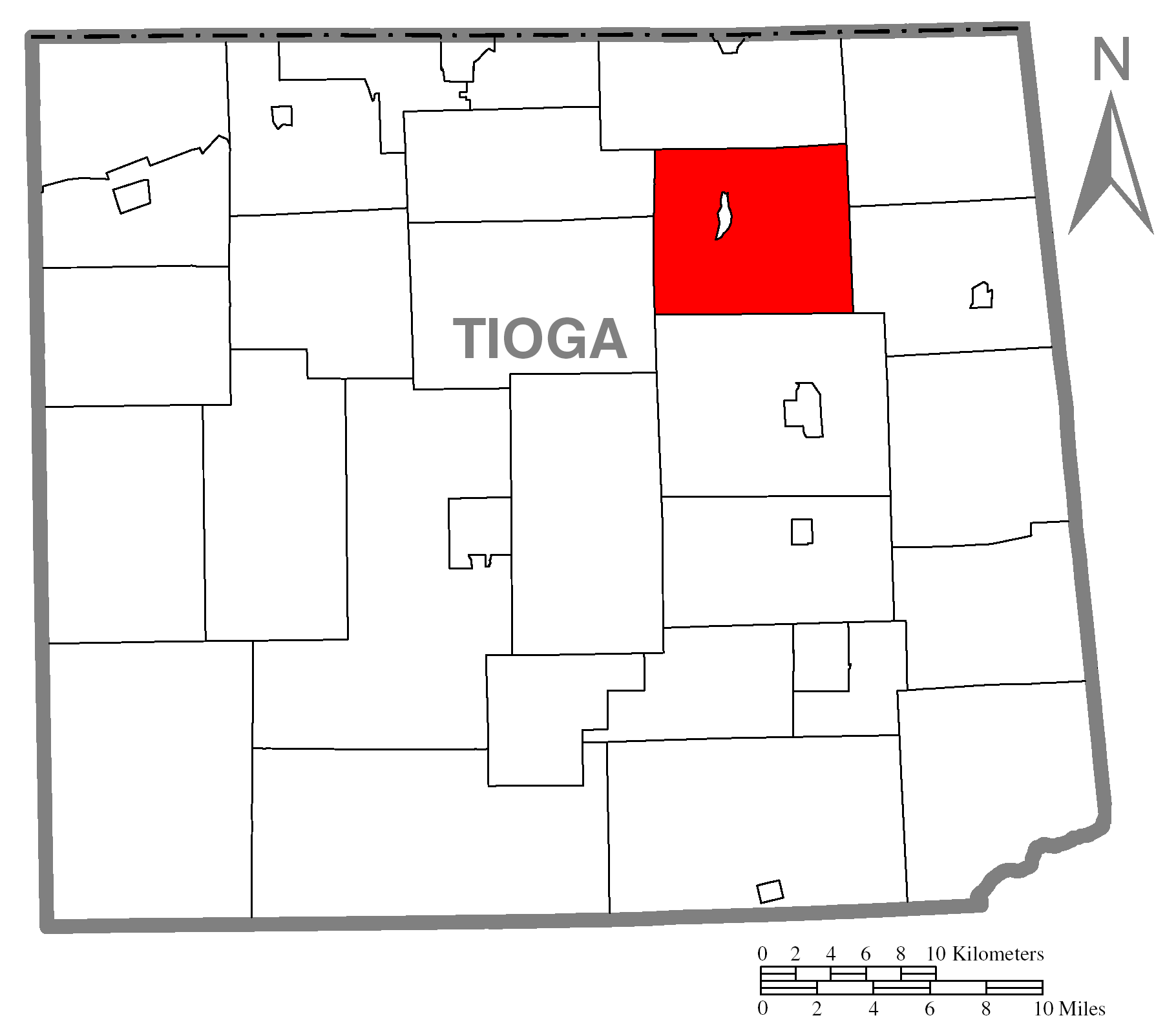
- Map of Tioga County Highlighting Tioga Township

- Map of Pennsylvania highlighting Tioga County
- Country: United States
- State: Pennsylvania
- County: Tioga
- Settled: 1792
- Incorporated: 1797

Area
  - Total: 39.86 sq mi (103.23 km^{2})
  - Land: 38.40 sq mi (99.45 km^{2})
  - Water: 1.46 sq mi (3.78 km^{2})

Population (2020)
  - Total: 940 ▼
  - Estimate (2023): 927
  - Density: 24.9/sq mi (9.62/km^{2})
- Time zone: Eastern Time Zone (North America)
  - Summer (DST): EDT
- FIPS code: 42-117-76824
- Website: https://tiogatownship.com/

Historical population
| Census | Pop. | Note | %± |
|---|---|---|---|
| 2000 | 995 | | — |
| 2010 | 991 | | −0.4% |
| 2020 | 940 | | −5.1% |
| 2023 (est.) | 927 | | −1.4% |
U.S. Decennial Census

Tioga Township is a township in Tioga County, Pennsylvania, United States. The population was 940 at the 2020 census.

== Geography ==
According to the United States Census Bureau, the township has a total area of 40.5 square miles (104.8 km^{2}), of which 38.7 square miles (100.2 km^{2}) is land and 1.8 square miles (4.6 km^{2}) (4.40%) is water.

Tioga Township is bordered by Lawrence Township to the north, Jackson and Rutland Townships to the east, Richmond Township to the south and Middlebury and Farmington Townships to the west. Tioga Township surrounds the borough of Tioga.

== Demographics ==
As of the census of 2000, there were 995 people, 385 households, and 286 families residing in the township. The population density was 25.7 people per square mile (9.9/km^{2}). There were 472 housing units at an average density of 12.2/sq mi (4.7/km^{2}). The racial makeup of the township was 99.20% White, 0.30% Native American, 0.10% Asian, and 0.40% from two or more races. Hispanic or Latino of any race were 0.20% of the population.

There were 385 households, out of which 30.4% had children under the age of 18 living with them, 62.1% were married couples living together, 6.5% had a female householder with no husband present, and 25.5% were non-families. 18.7% of all households were made up of individuals, and 8.6% had someone living alone who was 65 years of age or older. The average household size was 2.58 and the average family size was 2.93.

In the township the population was spread out, with 23.5% under the age of 18, 8.3% from 18 to 24, 26.5% from 25 to 44, 26.4% from 45 to 64, and 15.2% who were 65 years of age or older. The median age was 40 years. For every 100 females, there were 109.9 males. For every 100 females age 18 and over, there were 105.7 males.

The median income for a household in the township was $32,411, and the median income for a family was $38,250. Males had a median income of $30,536 versus $22,813 for females. The per capita income for the township was $15,290. About 11.7% of families and 14.6% of the population were below the poverty line, including 21.1% of those under age 18 and 11.8% of those age 65 or over.

== Notable person ==
John I. Mitchell - politician and judge

== Communities and locations ==
- Brooklyn – A village on Pennsylvania Route 287, just west of Tioga.
- Hammond Lake – A reservoir in the western part of the town which flows directly into the Tioga Reservoir.
- Mill Creek – A village on U.S. Route 15 in the central part of the township, near the Tioga Reservoir.
- Mitchell Creek – A village on U.S. Route 15 near the northern township line.
- Painter Run – A village in the southeastern corner of the township.
- Tioga – A borough on Pennsylvania Route 287 in the central part of the township.
- Tioga Reservoir – A reservoir east of and slightly smaller than Hammond Lake.
