= Lawrence Township, Tioga County, Pennsylvania =

Township in Pennsylvania, US

Coordinates: 41°58′00″N 77°07′59″W

- Township
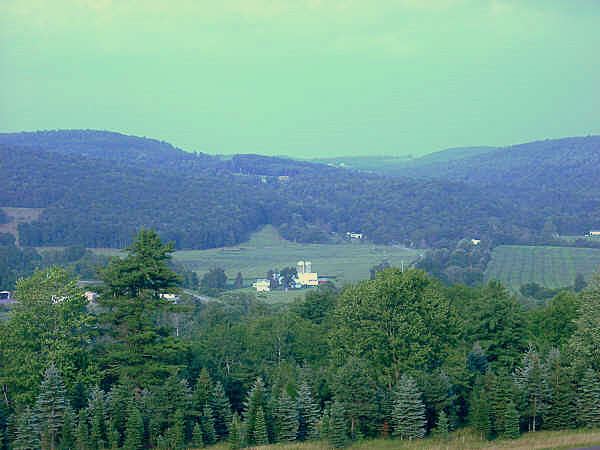
- Lawrence Township

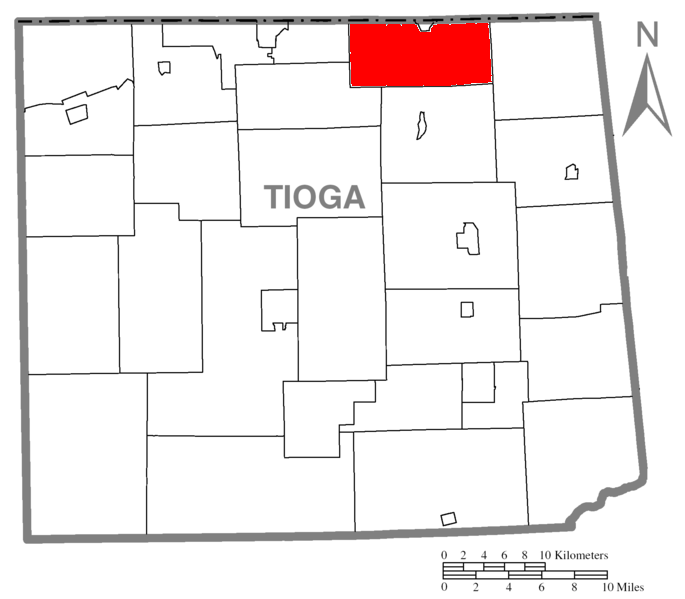
- Map of Tioga County Highlighting Lawrence Township

- Map of Pennsylvania highlighting Tioga County
- Country: United States
- State: Pennsylvania
- County: Tioga
- Settled: 1816
- Incorporated: 1816

Area
  - Total: 34.45 sq mi (89.23 km^{2})
  - Land: 34.45 sq mi (89.23 km^{2})
  - Water: 0 sq mi (0.00 km^{2})

Population (2020)
  - Total: 1,614 ▼
  - Estimate (2023): 1,601
  - Density: 49.1/sq mi (18.96/km^{2})
- Time zone: Eastern Time Zone (North America)
  - Summer (DST): EDT
- FIPS code: 42-117-41960
- Website: https://www.lawrencetownshiptiogacountypa.com/

Historical population
Census	Pop.	Note	%±
2000	1,721		—
2010	1,718		−0.2%
2020	1,614		−6.1%
2023 (est.)	1,601		−0.8%
U.S. Decennial Census

Lawrence Township is a township in Tioga County, Pennsylvania, United States. The population was 1,614 at the 2020 census.

== Geography ==
According to the United States Census Bureau, the township has a total area of 34.5 square miles (89 km^{2}), all land.

Lawrence Township forms the western, southern and eastern borders of Lawrenceville. The township is bordered by the Towns of Tuscarora, Lindley, and Caton in Steuben County, New York to the north, Jackson Township to the east, Tioga Township to the south, Farmington Township to the south and west and Nelson Township to the west.

== Demographics ==
As of the census of 2000, there were 1,721 people, 659 households, and 506 families residing in the township. The population density was 49.9 inhabitants per square mile (19.3/km^{2}). There were 744 housing units at an average density of 21.6/sq mi (8.3/km^{2}). The racial makeup of the township was 99.36% White, 0.17% African American, and 0.46% from two or more races. Hispanic or Latino of any race were 0.29% of the population.

There were 659 households, out of which 33.2% had children under the age of 18 living with them, 63.1% were married couples living together, 9.3% had a female householder with no husband present, and 23.2% were non-families. 17.6% of all households were made up of individuals, and 8.3% had someone living alone who was 65 years of age or older. The average household size was 2.61 and the average family size was 2.92.

In the township the population was spread out, with 26.3% under the age of 18, 5.5% from 18 to 24, 29.9% from 25 to 44, 24.2% from 45 to 64, and 14.1% who were 65 years of age or older. The median age was 38 years. For every 100 females, there were 97.8 males. For every 100 females age 18 and over, there were 95.7 males.

The median income for a household in the township was $35,926, and the median income for a family was $37,330. Males had a median income of $30,822 versus $20,000 for females. The per capita income for the township was $15,920. About 10.8% of families and 13.1% of the population were below the poverty line, including 15.4% of those under age 18 and 11.8% of those age 65 or over.

== Communities and locations ==
- Beeman – A village located in the southern part of the township, approximately three miles south of Lawrenceville.
- Cowanesque Lake – An artificial lake formed by the Cowanesque River in the northwestern part of the township, southwest of Lawrenceville.
- C V Junction – A village on U.S. Route 15, approximately one mile south of Lawrenceville.
- East Lawrence – A village in the eastern part of the township, southeast of Lawrenceville.
- Lawrenceville – A borough at the junction of Pennsylvania Route 49 and U.S. Route 15 just south of the New York state line.
- Pritchard – A former village along the Cowanesque River that was removed for the construction of Cowanesque Lake. It was located near the site of the upstream side of the dam site of the U.S. Army Corps. of Engineers Cowanesque Lake Dam.
- Somers Lane – A village on U.S. Route 15 in the central part of the township.
- Tioga Junction – A village at the junction of U.S. Route 15 and Pennsylvania Route 328.
- Tompkins – A former village near the western end of the township that was removed for the construction of Cowanesque Lake. It was located near the current Tompkins Campground of the U.S. Army Corps. of Engineers Cowanesque Lake Dam.
