= List of highways numbered 556 =

Route 556, or Highway 556, may refer to:

== Canada ==
- Alberta Highway 556
- Ontario Highway 556

== United Kingdom ==
- A556 road

== United States ==
- KY 556
- LA 556
- MS 556
- NM 556
- SR 556
- PR-556
- SC 556 (former)
- Texas:
  - FM 556
  - Loop 556

Preceded by 555	Lists of highways 556	Succeeded by 557
