= Millerton, Pennsylvania =

Unincorporated community in Pennsylvania, US

- Census-designated place
- Location within the state of Pennsylvania Millerton (the United States)
- Coordinates: 41°51′50″N 76°57′18″W
- Country: United States
- State: Pennsylvania
- County: Tioga
- Township: Jackson

Area
  - Total: 0.85 sq mi (2.21 km^{2})
  - Land: 0.85 sq mi (2.21 km^{2})
  - Water: 0 sq mi (0.00 km^{2})

Population (2020)
  - Total: 318
  - Density: 372.0/sq mi (143.63/km^{2})
- Time zone: UTC-5 (Eastern (EST))
  - Summer (DST): UTC-4 (EDT)
- ZIP code: 16936
- Area codes: 570 and 272
- FIPS code: 42-49736

Millerton is a census-designated place in Jackson Township, Tioga County, Pennsylvania, United States with the ZIP code 16936. It is located in far northeastern Tioga County, a few miles from the New York border. The community is situated along Pennsylvania Route 328. As of the 2010 census, the population was 316 residents.

== Demographics ==
Historical population
Census	Pop.	Note	%±
2020	318		—
U.S. Decennial Census

== Education ==
It is in the Northern Tioga School District.
