= Richmond Township, Tioga County, Pennsylvania =

Township in Pennsylvania, US

Coordinates: 41°47′00″N 77°07′59″W

- Township
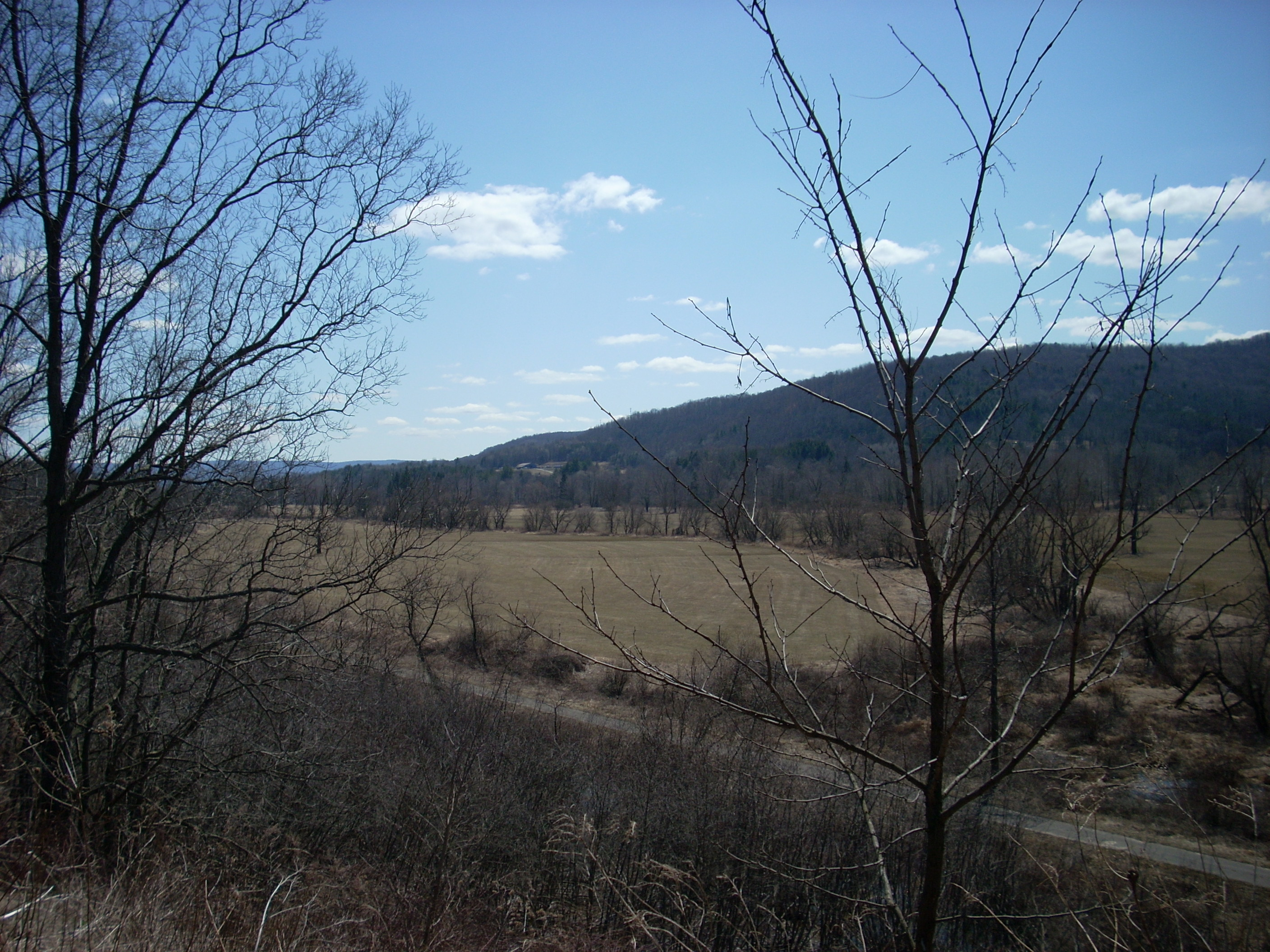
- A view of Richmond Township from U.S. Route 15

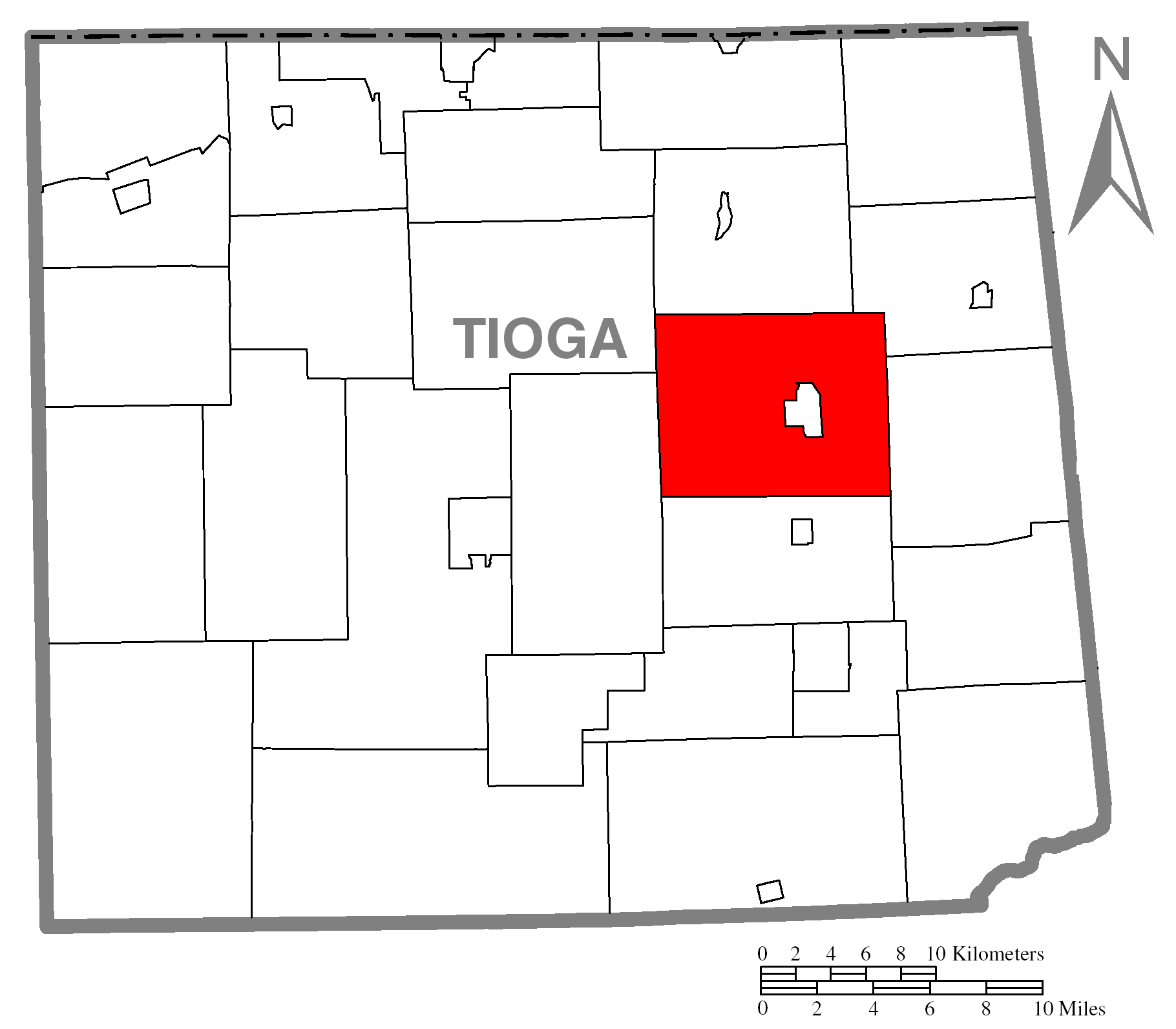
- Map of Tioga County Highlighting Richmond Township

- Map of Pennsylvania highlighting Tioga County
- Country: United States
- State: Pennsylvania
- County: Tioga
- Settled: 1794
- Incorporated: 1824

Area
  - Total: 50.31 sq mi (130.29 km^{2})
  - Land: 50.24 sq mi (130.11 km^{2})
  - Water: 0.069 sq mi (0.18 km^{2})

Population (2020)
  - Total: 2,164 ▼
  - Estimate (2023): 2,137
  - Density: 47.8/sq mi (18.45/km^{2})
- Time zone: Eastern Time Zone (North America)
  - Summer (DST): EDT
- FIPS code: 42-117-64624
- Website: https://richmondtwp.com/

Historical population
Census	Pop.	Note	%±
2000	2,475		—
2010	2,396		−3.2%
2020	2,164		−9.7%
2023 (est.)	2,137		−1.2%
U.S. Decennial Census

Richmond Township is a township in Tioga County, Pennsylvania, United States. The population was 2,164 at the 2020 census.

== Geography ==
According to the United States Census Bureau, the township has a total area of 50.9 square miles (131.8 km^{2}), of which 50.8 square miles (131.6 km^{2}) is land and 0.1 square mile (0.2 km^{2}) (0.14%) is water.

Richmond Township is bordered by Tioga Township to the north, Rutland Township to the north and east, Sullivan Township to the east, Covington Township to the south and Charleston and Middlebury Townships to the west. Richmond Township surrounds the borough of Mansfield.

== Demographics ==
As of the census of 2000, there were 2,475 people, 956 households, and 692 families residing in the township. The population density was 48.7 inhabitants per square mile (18.8/km^{2}). There were 1,067 housing units at an average density of 21.0/sq mi (8.1/km^{2}). The racial makeup of the township was 97.62% White, 0.44% African American, 0.36% Native American, 0.53% Asian, 0.24% from other races, and 0.81% from two or more races. Hispanic or Latino of any race were 0.69% of the population.

There were 956 households, out of which 33.8% had children under the age of 18 living with them, 60.6% were married couples living together, 9.0% had a female householder with no husband present, and 27.6% were non-families. 21.9% of all households were made up of individuals, and 7.8% had someone living alone who was 65 years of age or older. The average household size was 2.58 and the average family size was 3.02.

In the township the population was spread out, with 26.5% under the age of 18, 8.6% from 18 to 24, 25.5% from 25 to 44, 26.7% from 45 to 64, and 12.6% who were 65 years of age or older. The median age was 38 years. For every 100 females, there were 96.1 males. For every 100 females age 18 and over, there were 95.1 males.

The median income for a household in the township was $38,393, and the median income for a family was $42,833. Males had a median income of $28,719 versus $21,985 for females. The per capita income for the township was $17,650. About 4.5% of families and 7.1% of the population were below the poverty line, including 8.3% of those under age 18 and 4.8% of those age 65 or over.

== Communities and locations ==
- Canoe Camp – A village on U.S. Route 15, two miles south of Mansfield.
- Kellytown – A village on the Tioga River northwest of Mansfield.
- Mansfield – A borough in the east-central part of the township, at the junctions of U.S. Route 15 and U.S. Route 6. It is the largest borough by population in Tioga County.
- Tioga Reservoir – A very small portion of the Tioga Reservoir is located in northern Richmond Township.
- Lambs Creek – A former village just north of the Borough of Mansfield that was removed as part of the Tioga Reservoir project of the U.S. Army Corps. of Engineers.
