= Southport, New York =

- Town
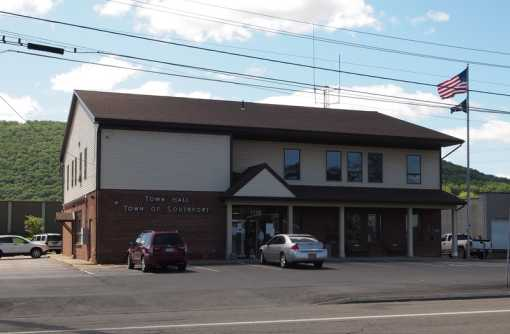
- Southport Town Hall

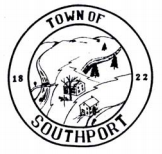
- Seal

- Location within New York Location within the United States
- Coordinates: 42°3′9″N 76°50′30″W
- Country: United States
- State: New York
- County: Chemung

Government
  - Type: Town Council
  - Town Supervisor: Joe Roman (R)
  - Town Council: Members' List: • Tim Steed; • Dan Hurley; • Kathy Szerszen; • Rich Mathews; • Dan Williams

Area
  - Total: 46.84 sq mi (121.31 km^{2})
  - Land: 46.41 sq mi (120.21 km^{2})
  - Water: 0.42 sq mi (1.10 km^{2})
- Elevation: 1,073 ft (327 m)

Population (2020)
  - Total: 9,684 ▼
  - Estimate (2021): 9,515
  - Density: 224.4/sq mi (86.64/km^{2})
- Time zone: UTC-5 (Eastern (EST))
  - Summer (DST): UTC-4 (EDT)
- ZIP Codes: 14871 (Pine City); 14904 (Elmira); 14894 (Wellsburg); 14830 (Corning)
- FIPS code: 36–015–69617
- GNIS feature ID: 0979509
- Website: townofsouthportny.gov

Southport is a town in Chemung County, New York, United States. The population was 9,684 according to the 2020 census. The town is located in the southwestern corner of Chemung County and is southwest of the city of Elmira. It is part of the Elmira Metropolitan Statistical Area.

== History ==
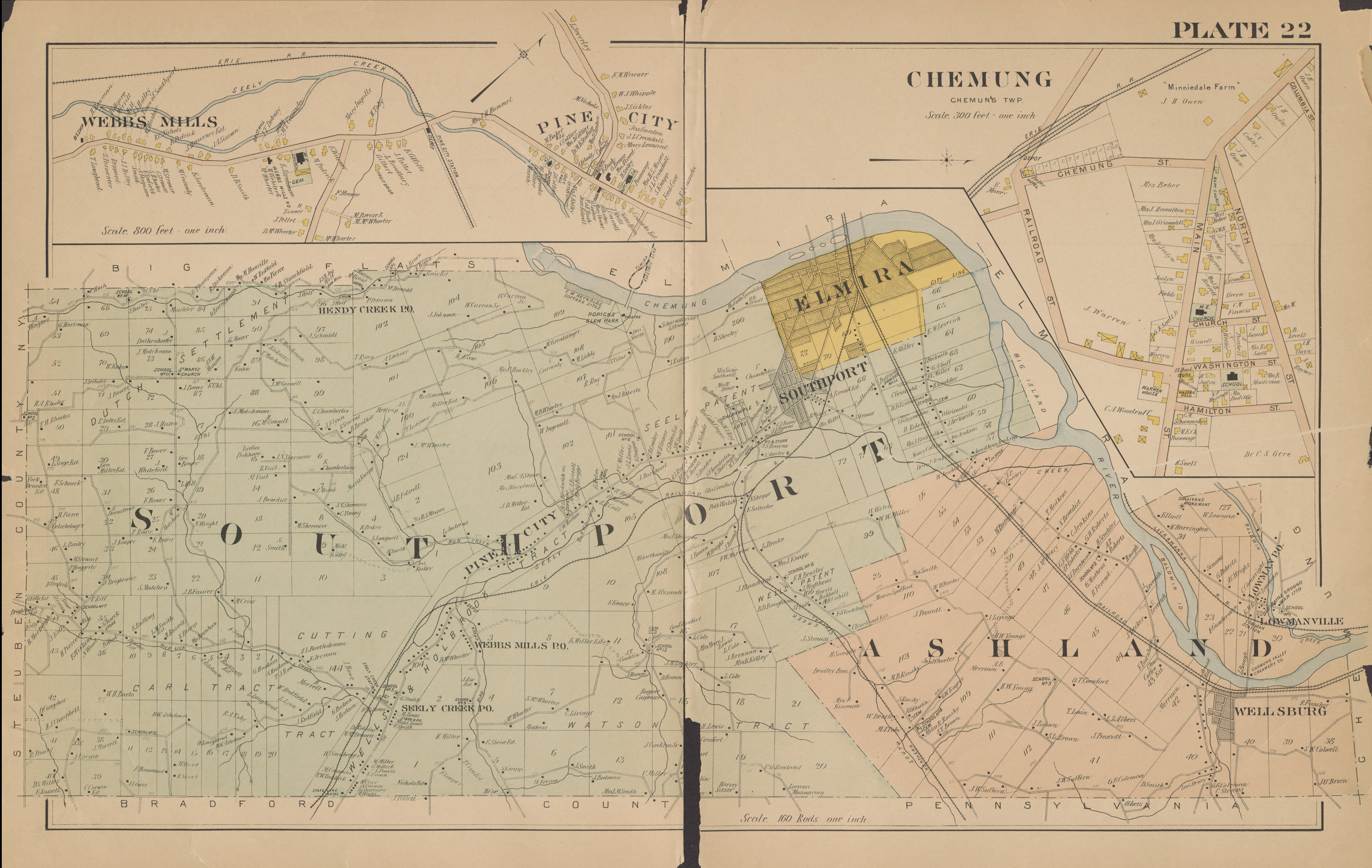
Town of Southport, with Ashland, 1904

Around 1786, the first settlers arrived in what is now modern day Southport. The town of Southport was officially incorporated as a town in 1822. Prior to the incorporation, the early community built a school in 1799 followed by a church built in 1819.

The area of Pine City began receiving its first settlers circa 1830. The area of Hendy Creek began receiving settlers around 10 years later circa 1840.

The area of Seeley Creek provided waterways to fuel businesses such as tanneries, and saw, woolen, and grist mills. Other businesses such as butchers, sugar bushes, quarries, a canning factory, and a cheese factory.

In 1867, the northern section of the town was donated to the City of Elmira. The same year, part of Southport was used to form part of the new town of Ashland. In 1875, Southport was the number one farming town in the entire county with a total of 375 farms selling vegetables, fruits, butter, milk, and eggs to many markets in Elmira, Ashland, and more around the region. Around this time tobacco became a major crop in the region, benefiting Southport's economy.

From 1848 to 1890 a plank road that ran through The Southport communities and locations of Bulkhead, Pine City, Webb Mills, and Seeley Creek was the main passageway from Elmira to the Pennsylvania border.

In 1901, Pennsylvania Avenue allowed for smoother passageway to different areas in New York.

In 1957, the Southport School District merged with the Elmira City School District. Soon the smaller, rural schools were formally closed and their students were transferred to larger schools such as Hendy Avenue School, the new Broadway Elementary School, and Southside High School.

On April 12, 1978, the Southport Historical society announced a contest to design the town's first seal, offering cash prizes to residents. On June 1, 1979, the judges of the competition picked the first place design. It was designed by Ralph F. Enyedy. Later that year, on October 9, 1979, the Southport Historical Society presented an adapted version of the one designed by Ralph F. Enyedy to the town and the Town. The town then accepted it with Resolution No. 177-79. The final seal was cast in bronze and presented to the Town Clerk and Town Board on Tuesday November 13, 1979.

== Geography ==
According to the United States Census Bureau, Southport has a total area of 46.8 square miles (121.3 km^{2}), of which 46.4 square miles (120.2 km^{2}) is land and 0.42 square miles (1.1 km^{2}), or 0.91%, is water.

The southern town line is the border of Pennsylvania, and the western town boundary is the border of Steuben County. The Chemung River, a tributary of the Susquehanna River, forms part of the northern border.

New York State Route 14 and New York State Route 328 are north–south highways that intersect in Southport village.

== Demographics ==
Historical population
Census	Pop.	Note	%±
1830	1,454		—
1840	2,101		44.5%
1850	3,184		51.5%
1860	4,733		48.6%
1870	2,185		−53.8%
1880	3,619		65.6%
1890	2,044		−43.5%
1900	2,201		7.7%
1910	2,034		−7.6%
1920	3,084		51.6%
1930	5,421		75.8%
1940	5,774		6.5%
1950	9,164		58.7%
1960	11,433		24.8%
1970	11,976		4.7%
1980	11,586		−3.3%
1990	11,571		−0.1%
2000	11,185		−3.3%
2010	10,940		−2.2%
2020	9,684		−11.5%
2021 (est.)	9,515	▼	−1.7%
U.S. Decennial Census

As of the census of 2000, there were 11,185 people, 4,189 households, and 2,890 families residing in the town. The population density was 240.4 inhabitants per square mile (92.8/km^{2}). There were 4,353 housing units at an average density of 93.6 per square mile (36.1/km^{2}). The racial makeup of the town was 90.55% White, 6.78% Black or African American, 0.19% Native American, 0.23% Asian, 0.04% Pacific Islander, 1.47% from other races, and 0.75% from two or more races. Hispanic or Latino of any race were 2.91% of the population.

There were 4,189 households, out of which 28.6% had children under the age of 18 living with them, 54.7% were married couples living together, 10.4% had a female householder with no husband present, and 31.0% were non-families. 26.2% of all households were made up of individuals, and 12.3% had someone living alone who was 65 years of age or older. The average household size was 2.42 and the average family size was 2.89.

In the town, the population was spread out, with 21.2% under the age of 18, 8.1% from 18 to 24, 29.3% from 25 to 44, 24.6% from 45 to 64, and 16.7% who were 65 years of age or older. The median age was 40 years. For every 100 females, there were 109.1 males. For every 100 females age 18 and over, there were 111.2 males.

The median income for a household in the town was $38,580, and the median income for a family was $44,232. Males had a median income of $32,144 versus $24,410 for females. The per capita income for the town was $18,454. About 8.7% of families and 11.7% of the population were below the poverty line, including 18.5% of those under age 18 and 4.2% of those age 65 or over.

== Communities and locations in Town of Southport ==
- Bulkhead – A former community in the town.
- Mudlick Creek – A stream flowing out the western side of the town.
- Mount Zoar – A prominent hill in the northern part of the town.
- Pine City – A hamlet between Southport village and Webb Mills on NY-328. The name is from the large number of pine trees.
- Rosstown – A location south of Southport on County Road 26.
- Sagetown – A location near the western town line on County Road 36 and Mudlick Creek.
- Seeley Creek – (1) A stream that flows northward through the town to the Chemung River, (2) A hamlet south of Webb Mills on NY-328. The name is that of an early settler family.
- Southport – The hamlet of Southport is in the northeastern part of the town, located on NY-14, and is also a suburb of Elmira.
- Webb Mills – A hamlet in the south central part of the town and north of Seeley Creek on NY-328.
