= Wells Township, Bradford County, Pennsylvania =

Township in Pennsylvania, US

Coordinates: 41°57′08″N 76°52′30″W

- Township
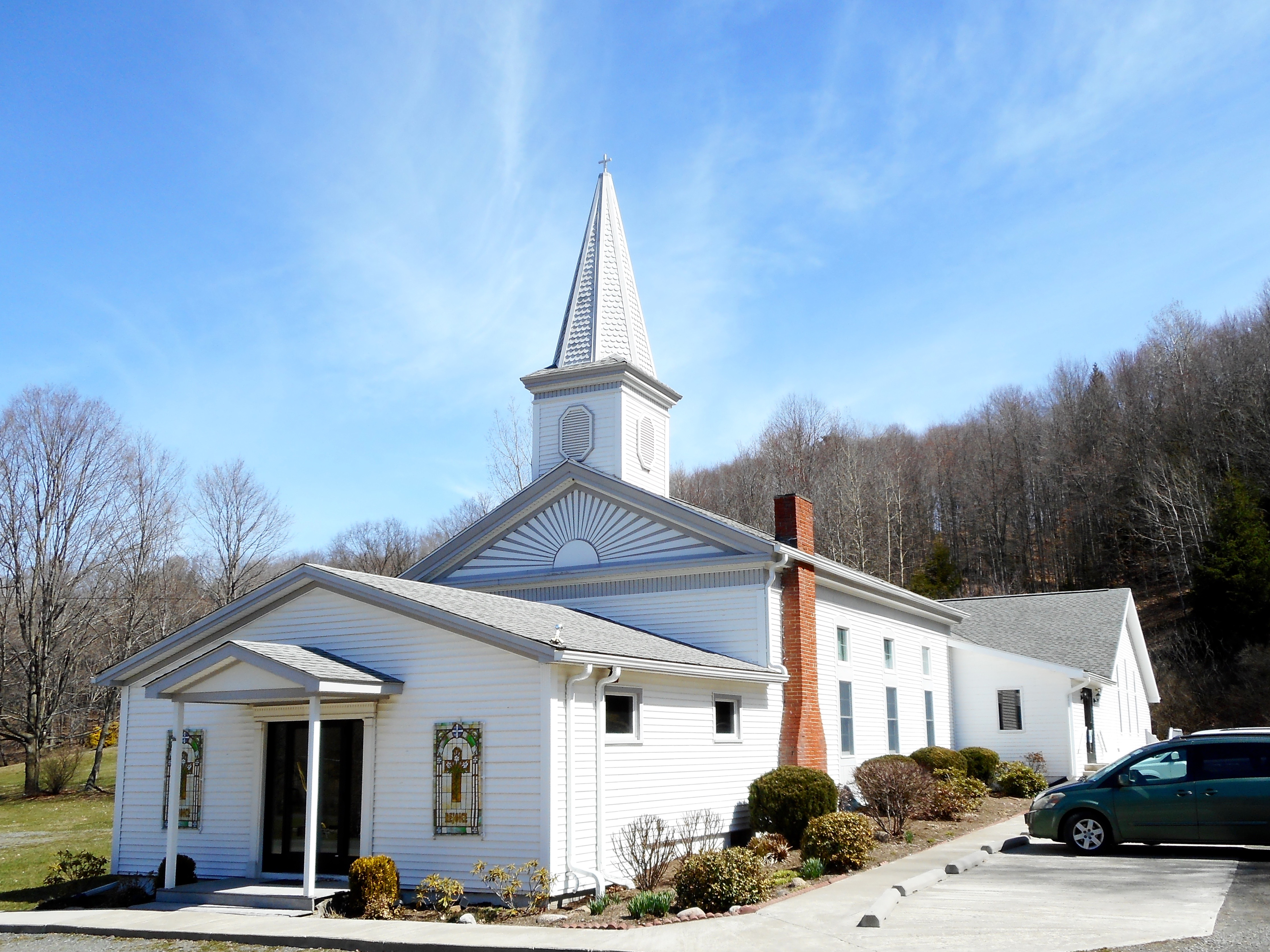
- Mosherville Bible Church

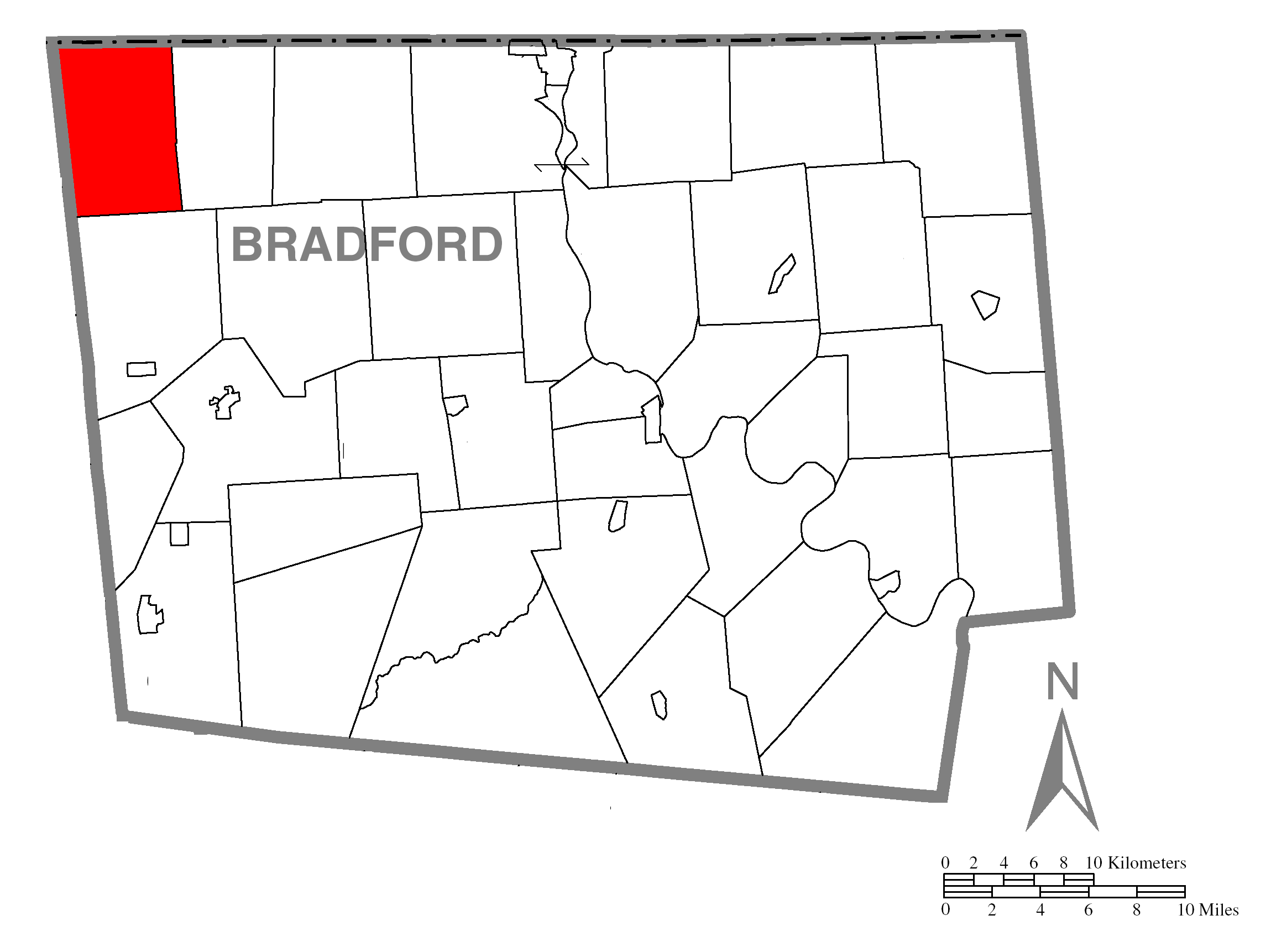
- Map of Bradford County with Wells Township highlighted

- Map of Bradford County, Pennsylvania
- Country: United States
- State: Pennsylvania
- County: Bradford
- Settled: 1792
- Incorporated: 1813

Area
  - Total: 33.86 sq mi (87.69 km^{2})
  - Land: 33.76 sq mi (87.43 km^{2})
  - Water: 0.10 sq mi (0.26 km^{2})

Population (2010)
  - Total: 814
  - Estimate (2016): 806
  - Density: 23.9/sq mi (9.22/km^{2})
- Area code: 570
- FIPS code: 42-015-82144

Wells Township is a township in Bradford County, Pennsylvania. It is part of Northeastern Pennsylvania. The population was 814 at the 2010 census.

== Geography ==
Wells Township is located in the northwest corner of Bradford County, along the New York state line. It is bordered by South Creek Township to the east, Columbia Township to the south and Rutland and Jackson townships in Tioga County to the west. To the north, in Chemung County, New York, is the town of Southport. The primary settlement in the township is the unincorporated community of Mosherville, in the valley of Seeley Creek in the northwest. Children residing in the township are assigned to attend the Troy Area School District.

According to the United States Census Bureau, the township has a total area of 33.9 square miles (87.7 km^{2}), of which 33.7 square miles (87.4 km^{2}) is land and 0.12 square miles (0.3 km^{2}), or 0.30%, is water.

== Demographics ==
Historical population
Census	Pop.	Note	%±
2010	814		—
2016 (est.)	806		−1.0%
U.S. Decennial Census

As of the census of 2000, there were 1,278 people, 462 households, and 353 families residing in the township. The population density was 37.7 inhabitants per square mile (14.6/km^{2}). There were 538 housing units at an average density of 15.9/sq mi (6.1/km^{2}). The racial makeup of the township was 99.45% White, 0.16% Native American, and 0.39% from two or more races. Hispanic or Latino of any race were 0.23% of the population.

There were 462 households, out of which 33.8% had children under the age of 18 living with them, 65.8% were married couples living together, 6.9% had a female householder with no husband present, and 23.4% were non-families. 18.8% of all households were made up of individuals, and 8.2% had someone living alone who was 65 years of age or older. The average household size was 2.72 and the average family size was 3.08.

In the township the population was spread out, with 27.4% under the age of 18, 6.5% from 18 to 24, 27.9% from 25 to 44, 24.4% from 45 to 64, and 13.8% who were 65 years of age or older. The median age was 39 years. For every 100 females, there were 104.2 males. For every 100 females age 18 and over, there were 104.0 males.

The median income for a household in the township was $36,420, and the median income for a family was $40,489. Males had a median income of $29,408 versus $21,215 for females. The per capita income for the township was $15,717. About 10.0% of families and 12.3% of the population were below the poverty line, including 17.6% of those under age 18 and 8.8% of those age 65 or over.
