= Erie Railroad =

Former railroad that operated in the northeastern United States

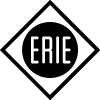
- A map of Erie Railroad's rail lines
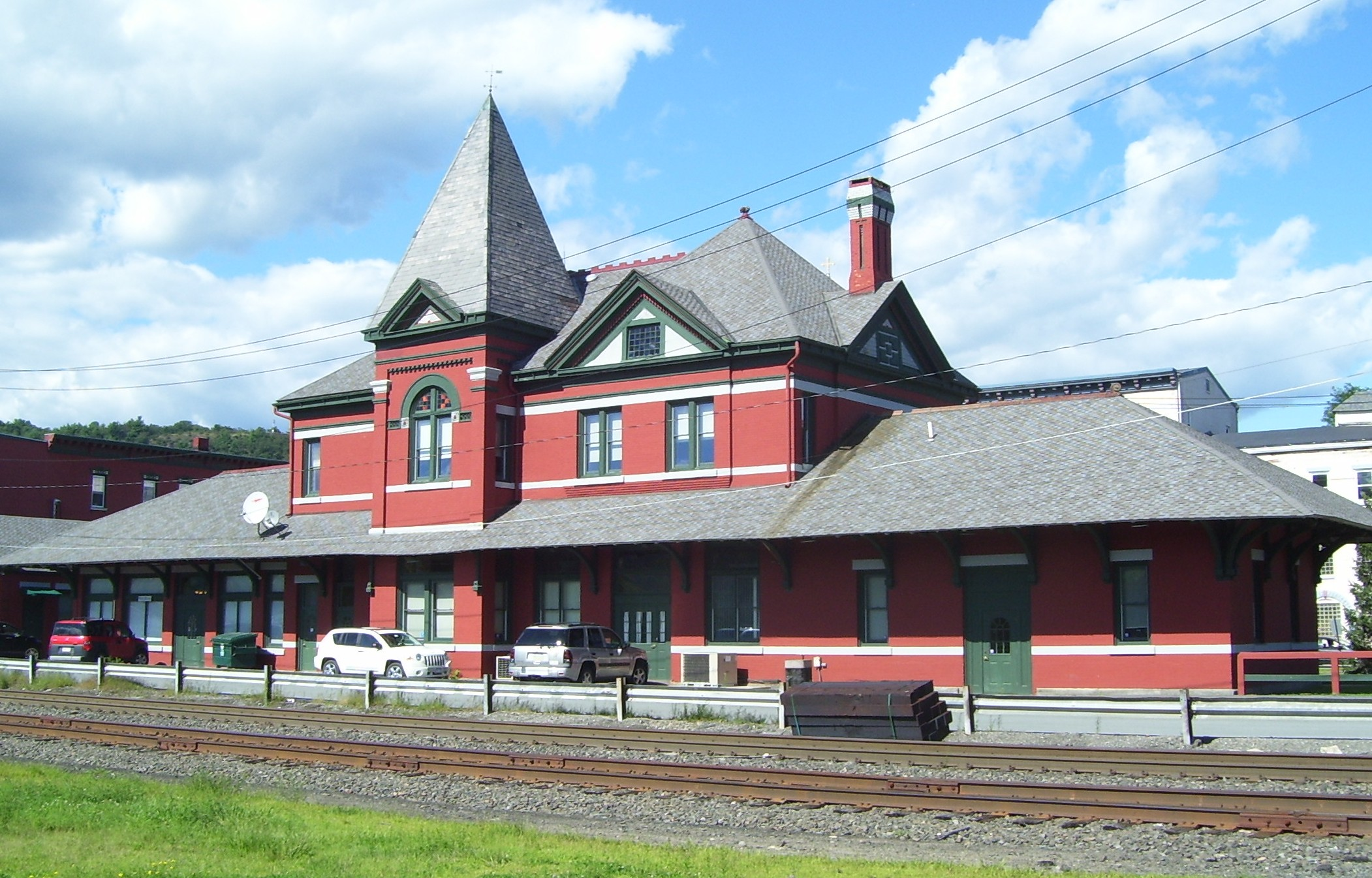
- Erie Depot at Port Jervis, a major station on the Erie

Overview
- Headquarters: New York City, U.S. (1832–1931); Cleveland, Ohio, U.S. (1931–60)
- Reporting mark: ERIE
- Locale: New Jersey; Pennsylvania; New York; Ohio; Indiana; Illinois
- Founder: Eleazar Lord
- Dates of operation: 1832–1960
- Successor: Erie Lackawanna Railway

Technical
- Track gauge: 4 ft 8 1/2 in (1,435 mm) standard gauge
- Previous gauge: 6 ft (1,829 mm) gauge
- Length: 2,316 miles (3,727 kilometers)

The Erie Railroad (reporting mark ERIE) was a railroad that operated in the Northeastern United States from 1832 to 1960.

The railroad originally connected Pavonia Terminal in Jersey City, New Jersey, with Lake Erie at Dunkirk, New York. It expanded west to Chicago after its 1865 merger with the former Atlantic and Great Western Railroad, also known as the New York, Pennsylvania and Ohio Railroad (NYPANO RR). The mainline route of the Erie Railroad shaped the development and economic growth of the Southern Tier of New York state, including the cities of Binghamton, Elmira, and Hornell. The railroad's repair shops were the largest employer in Hornell, where Erie's mainline split into a route northwest to Buffalo and another west to Chicago.

On October 17, 1960, the Erie merged with the rival Delaware, Lackawanna and Western Railroad to form the Erie Lackawanna Railway. Conrail took over in 1976; the Hornell repair shops were subsequently closed and repair operations moved to the Lackawanna facility in Scranton, Pennsylvania.

Most of the surviving Erie Railroad routes are operated by the Norfolk Southern Railway, including track between Hornell and Binghamton that is a key link in the railroad's Southern Tier mainline. Other remnants of the Erie Railroad became part of New Jersey Transit rail operations, including parts of its Main Line, in 1983.

== History ==
=== New York and Erie Railroad: 1832–1861 ===
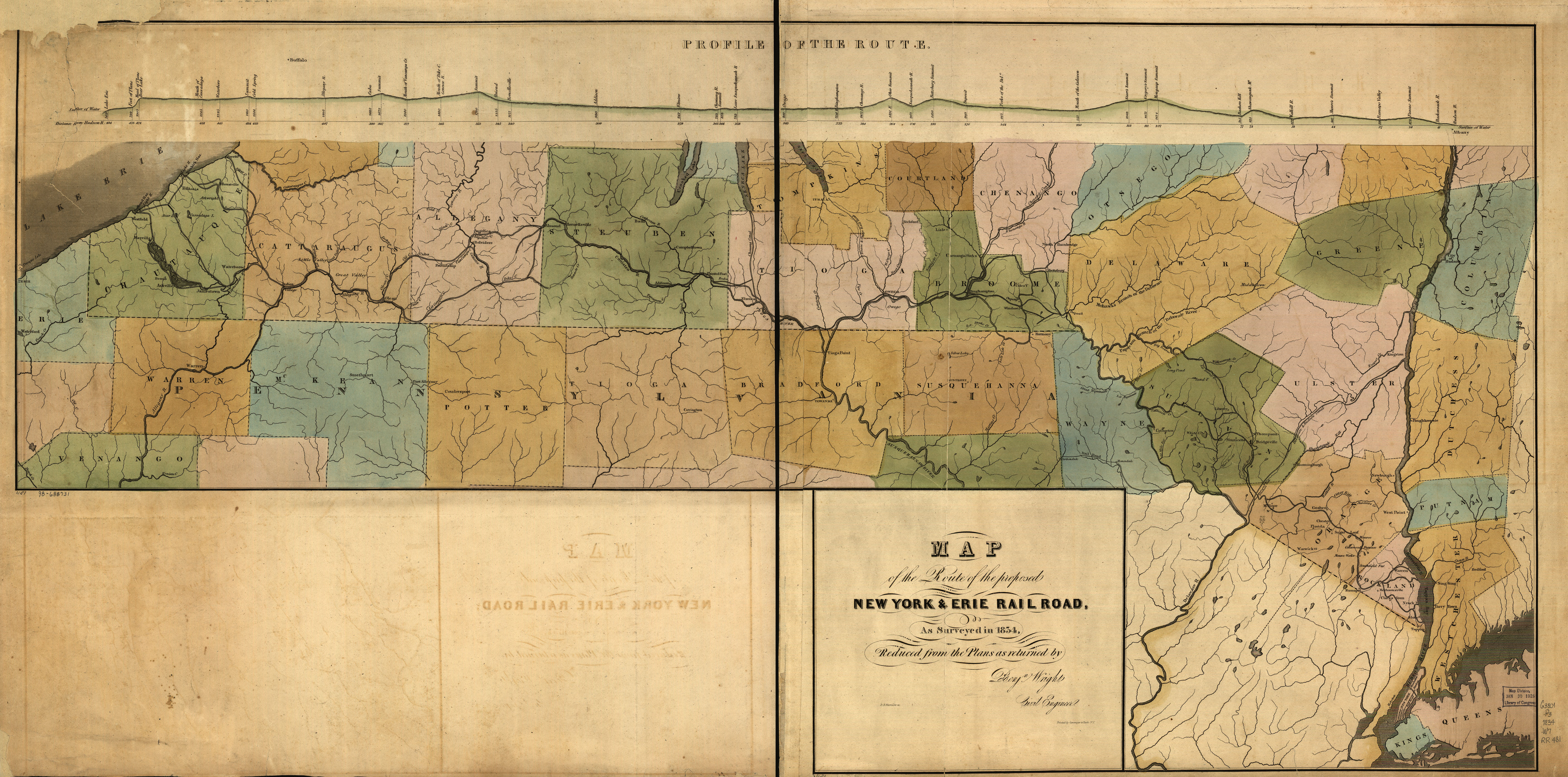
Erie Railroad's 1834 rail line plan

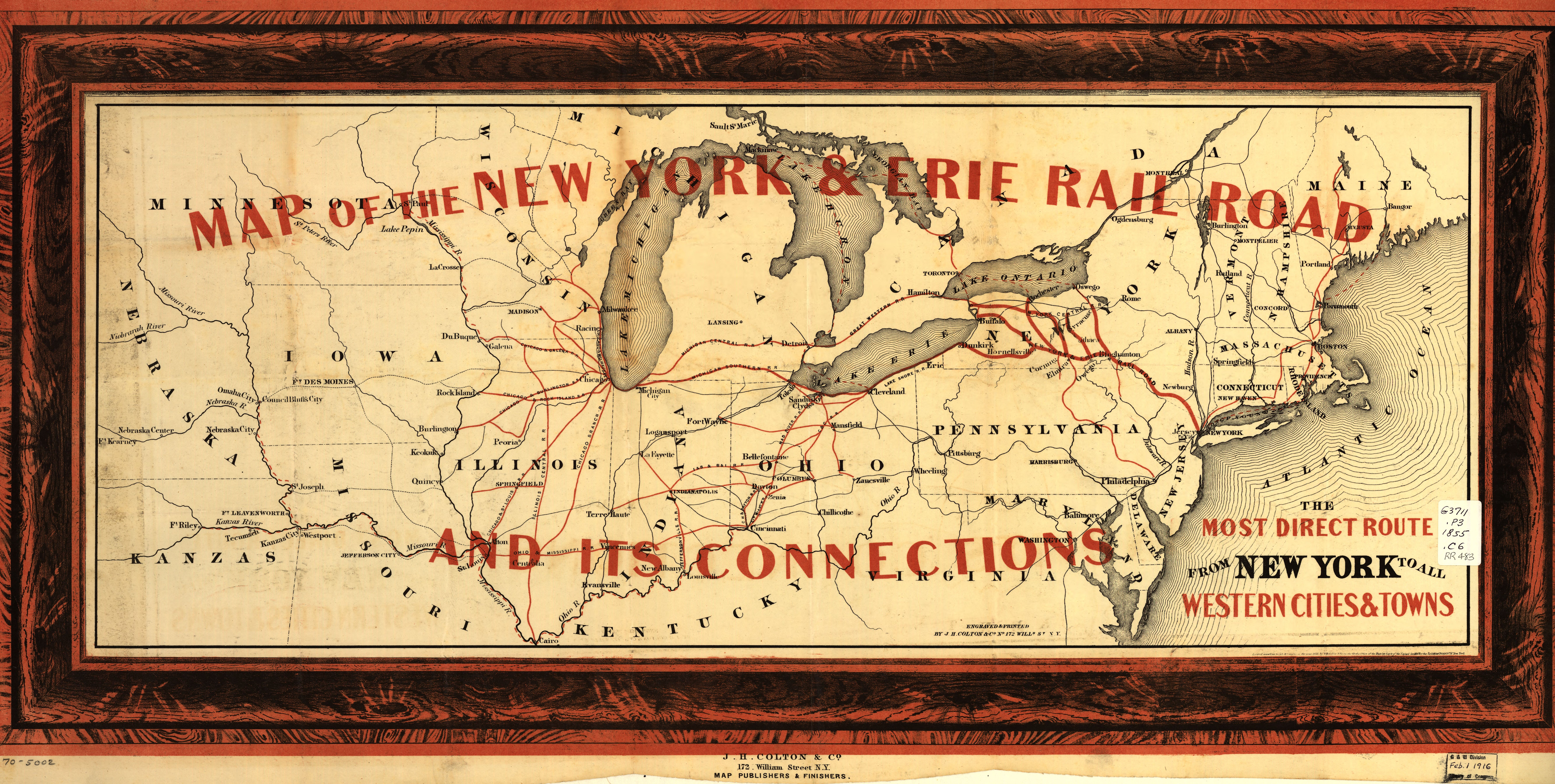
An 1855 map of the New York and Erie Railroad

In December 1831, a group met for a "convention" to discuss growing transportation needs in the Southern Tier region of New York State. As a result of that meeting, a company was organized to build the New York and Erie Rail Road, which was chartered on April 24, 1832, by New York governor Enos T. Throop. It was to connect the Hudson River at Piermont, north of New York City, west to Lake Erie at Dunkirk. On February 16, 1841, the railroad was authorized to cross into the northeast corner of Pennsylvania on the west side of the Delaware River, a few miles west of Port Jervis, NY, as the east side was already occupied by the Delaware and Hudson Canal to a point several miles west of Lackawaxen, PA. Construction began in 1836 and was opened in sections until reaching the full length to Dunkirk on May 19, 1851. At Dunkirk, steamboats continued across Lake Erie to Detroit, Michigan. The line crossed the Kittatinny Mountains at 870 feet. The New York Legislature had forced the Erie to use a less populated route to spur economic growth in these less populated areas

When the route was completed in May, 1851, President Millard Fillmore and several members of his cabinet, including Secretary of State Daniel Webster, made a special, two-day excursion run to open the railway. It is reported that Webster viewed the entire run from a rocking chair attached to a flatcar, with a steamer rug and jug of high-quality Medford rum. At stops, he would step off the flatcar and give speeches.

The line was built at 6 ft (1,829 mm) wide gauge; this was believed to be a superior technology to standard gauge, providing more stability.

In 1848, the railroad built the Starrucca Viaduct, a stone railroad bridge over Starrucca Creek in Lanesboro, Pennsylvania, which has survived and is still in use today. In fact, current owner Central New York Railroad spent $3.2 million in 2021 centering its single remaining track, re-ballasting and repairing masonry. The viaduct is 1,040 feet (317 m) long, 100 feet (30.5 m) high and 25 feet (7.6 m) wide at the top. It is the oldest stone rail bridge in Pennsylvania still in use.

As stated in the introduction, the shops in Hornell, New York were the largest on the Erie system beginning in the late 1920s, processing about 350 locomotives per year with "classified" (heavy) repairs. However, the first major repair facilities were built in Susquehanna, Pennsylvania in 1848, which were enlarged in 1863 to employ 700 workers. The primary car shops were located in Meadville, Pennsylvania in the western part of the state, employing 3,500 in 1912.

=== Erie Railway: 1861–1878 ===
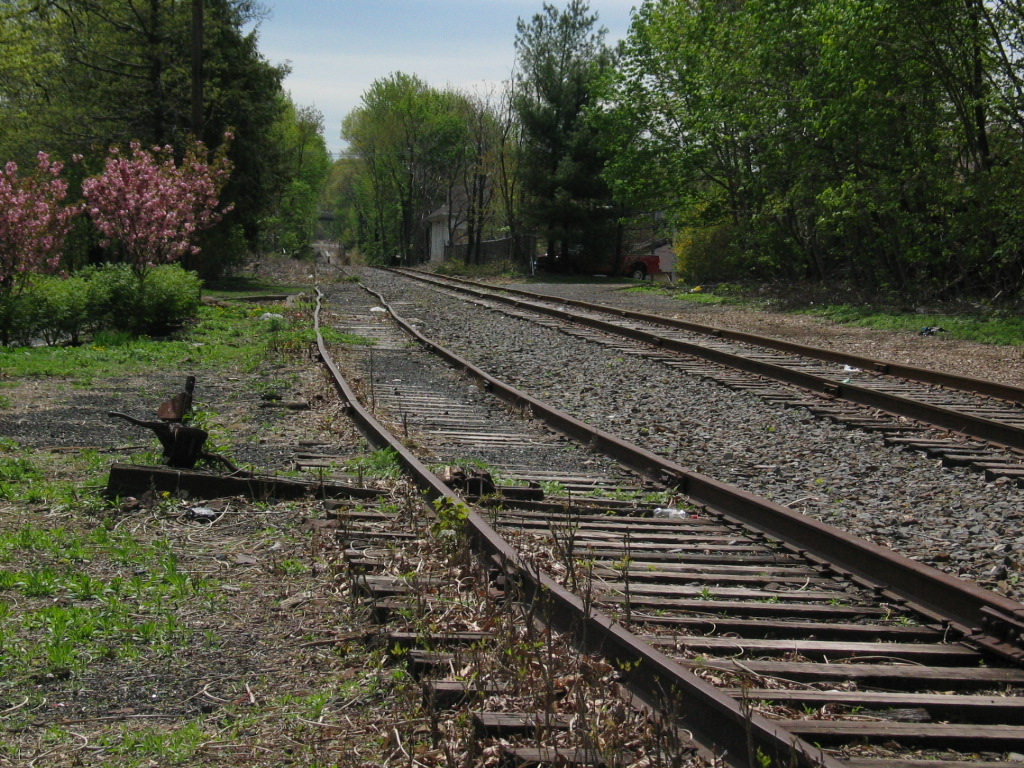
Former Erie Railroad tracks pass through Nutley, New Jersey; the track on the left is out of service

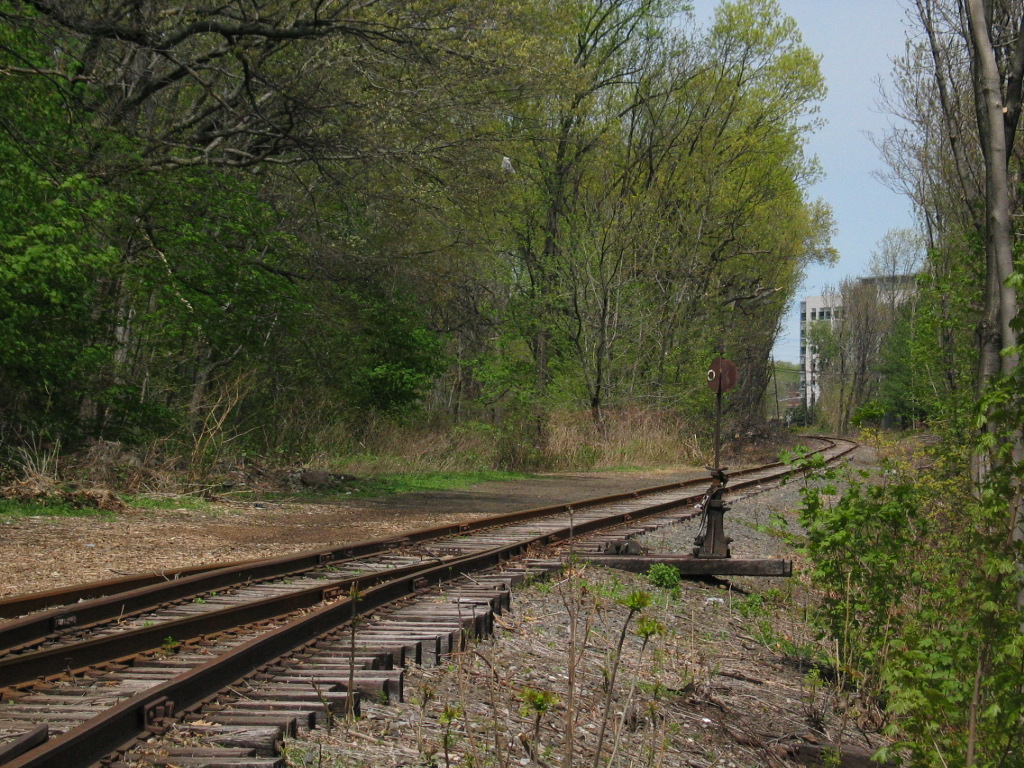
The railway switch in Nutley, New Jersey

In August 1859, the company went into receivership due to inability to make payments on the debts incurred for the large costs of building, and, on June 25, 1861, it was reorganized as the Erie Railway. This was the first bankruptcy of a major trunk line in the U.S.

In the Erie War of the 1860s, four well-known financiers struggled for control of the company; Cornelius Vanderbilt versus Daniel Drew, James Fisk and Jay Gould. Gould ultimately triumphed in this struggle, but was forced to relinquish control in 1872–73 due to unfavorable public opinion following his involvement in the 1869 gold-rigging scandal and to his loss of $1 million of Erie Railroad stock to the British con-man Lord Gordon-Gordon. Investors in the railroad were also weary of Gould's financial wars with Vanderbilt that caused wild stock price fluctuations and operating losses from rate battles. Upon leaving the Erie he managed to take $4 million, which he claimed was the railroad's "debt" to him.

In 1869, the railroad moved its main shop facilities from Dunkirk to Buffalo. Rather than demolishing the shops in Dunkirk, the facility was leased to Horatio G. Brooks, the former chief engineer of the NY&E who was at the controls of the first train into Dunkirk in 1851. Horatio Brooks used the facilities to begin Brooks Locomotive Works, which remained in independent business until 1901 when it was merged with seven other locomotive manufacturing firms to create ALCO. ALCO continued new locomotive production at this facility until 1934, then closed the plant completely in 1962.

The cost of breaking bulk cargo in order to interchange with standard gauge lines led the Erie to introduce a line of cars designed to operate on both broad gauge and standard gauge trucks. Beginning in 1871, the railroad interchanged traffic by means of truck exchange, including through passenger and freight connections to St. Louis, Missouri, using a Nutter car hoist in Urbana, Ohio. Beginning in 1876, the Erie carried out their plans to convert their trackage to standard gauge, since it was deemed that the standard gauge-broad gauge interchange operations could not justify the costs. By 1878, the Erie built a third rail along the entire mainline from Buffalo to Jersey City. The third rail installation and standard-gauge conversion projects were so expensive, that the railroad was forced into bankruptcy.

=== New York, Lake Erie and Western Railroad: 1878–1895 ===
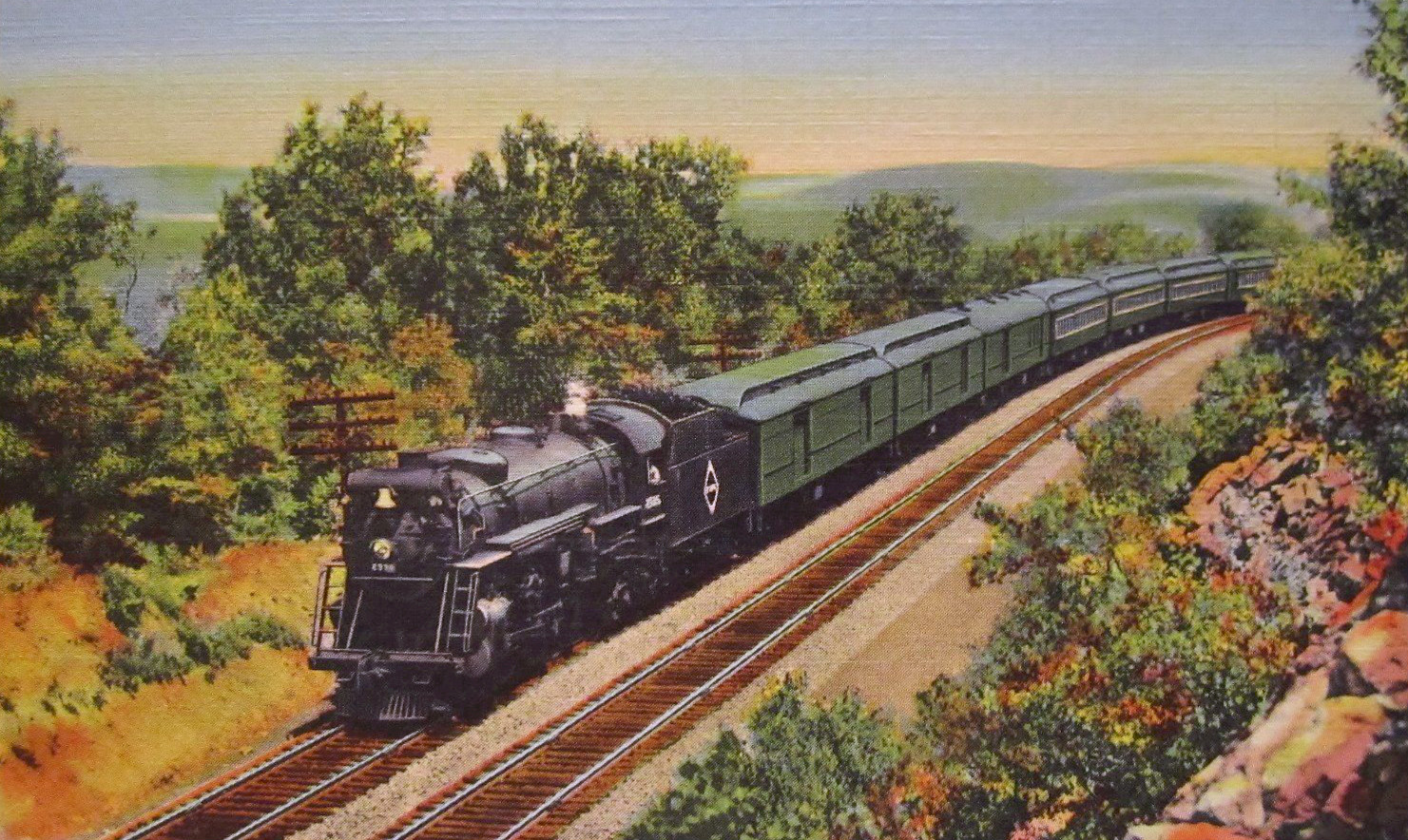
The Erie Limited, which traveled between New York City and Chicago

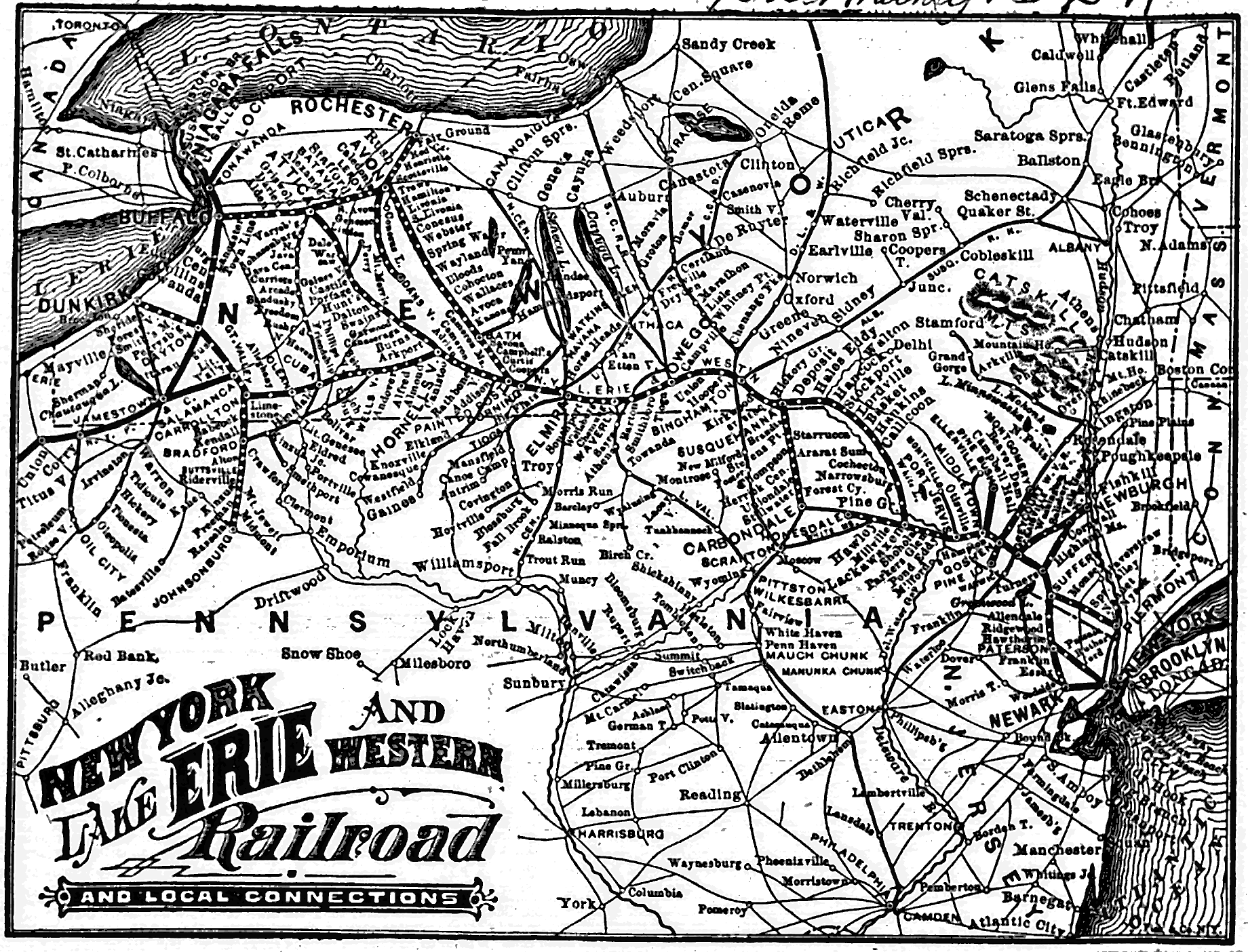
A rail line system map, c. 1884

The Erie still did not see profits, and was sold in 1878 via bankruptcy reorganization to become the New York, Lake Erie and Western Railroad. On June 22, 1880, the railroad's standard-gauge conversion process was completed.

In 1886, it was reported that the Erie and the Philadelphia and Reading Railway shared ferry services between their two Jersey City terminals, the larger being Pavonia Terminal, and Fulton Ferry in Brooklyn, New York for 11 round trips on weekdays and Saturdays, and four round trips on Sunday. In 1889, it opened a new bridge across the Hackensack River improving service to its terminals.

=== Erie Railroad: 1895–1960 ===
By 1893, the New York, Lake Erie and Western Railroad went into bankruptcy reorganization again, and then the company emerged in 1895 as the Erie Railroad. By that time, the company began to obtain financial support from J. P. Morgan. In 1898, the Erie obtained a subsidiary, the New York, Susquehanna and Western Railroad (NYS&W), after Morgan purchased the majority of their shares, on the Erie's behalf. The control of the NYS&W allowed the Erie to gain access to anthracite coal mines south of Scranton, Pennsylvania, competing with coal operations from the Delaware, Lackawanna and Western Railroad (DL&W).

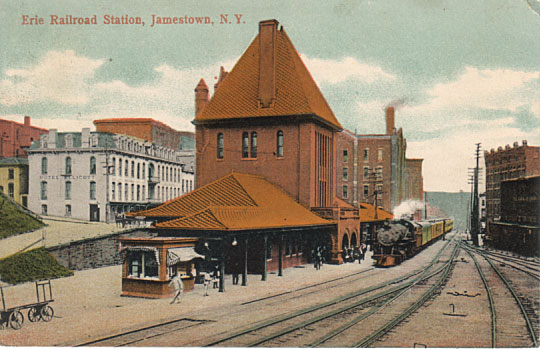
Erie Railroad's station in Jamestown, New York, c. 1909

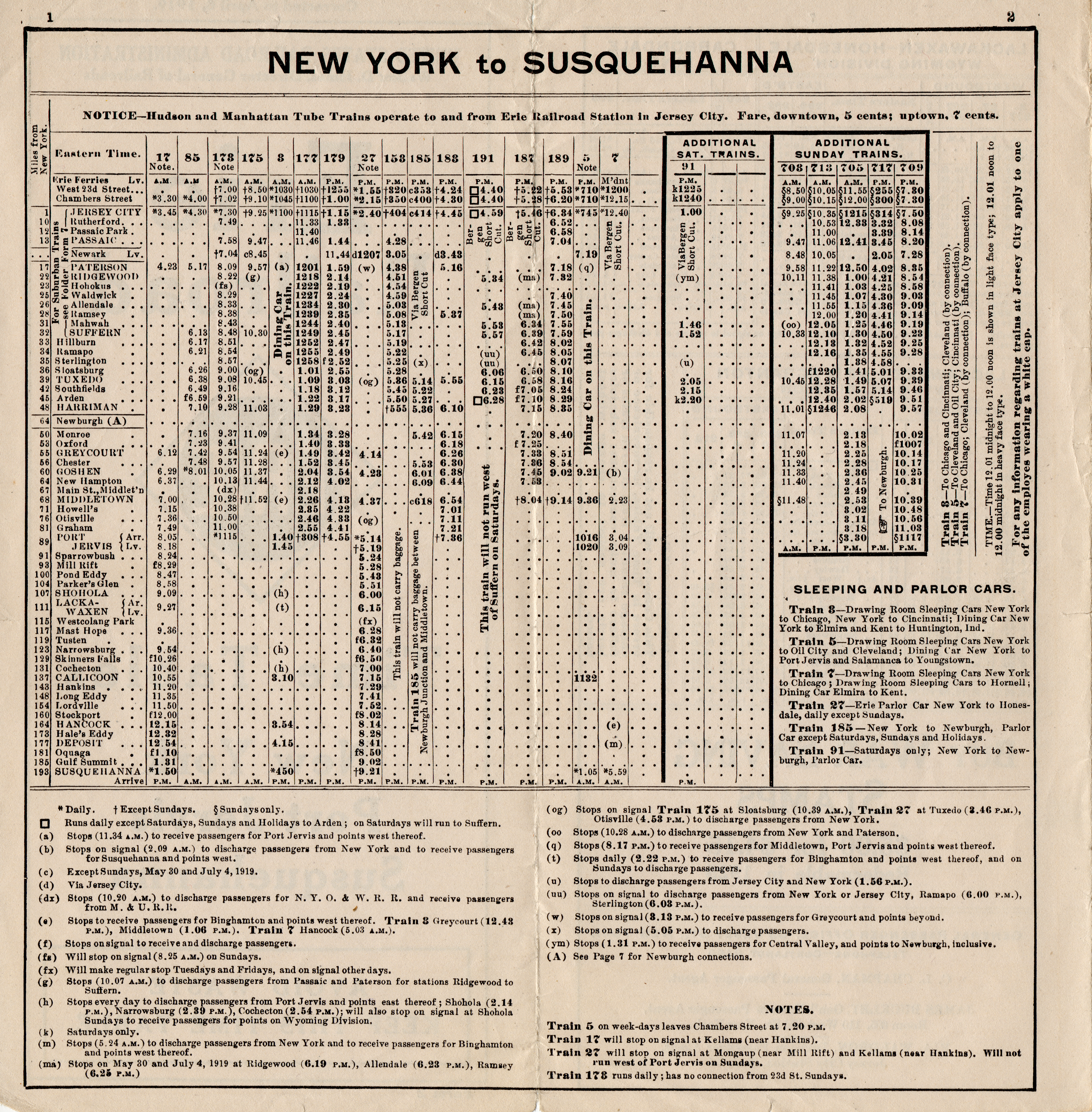
The Erie Railroad Main Line's westbound passenger timetable for its New York City to Susquehanna service under the United States Railway Administration, effective April 1919

George W. Perkins brought Frederick D. Underwood into the Erie Railroad in 1910. During the eastern railroad strike of 1913 Underwood agreed to accept any ruling made by mediators under the Newlands Reclamation Act. One of the demands made by Erie employees was a 20% increase in wages. Erie management had refused a wage increase, but compromised by asking employees to wait until January, 1915 for any advance. Union leaders agreed to make this an issue which Erie management would settle with its own men. However, W.G. Lee, president of the Brotherhood of Railroad Trainmen, asserted that the only way "to deal with the Erie is through J.P. Morgan & Company, or the banks". Underwood responded from his home in Wauwatosa, Wisconsin, stating "I am running the Erie Railroad: not George W. Perkins, nor J.P. Morgan, nor anybody else."

In the mid-1920s, the Van Sweringen brothers of Cleveland, Ohio, assumed control of the Erie, and they installed a new president for the railroad, John Joseph Bernet. Bernet only served as the Erie's president from January 1927 to May 1929, but during that time, he initiated a reorganization and cost-cutting program to improve the company's operations and finances. He also arranged for the Erie to replace most of their steam locomotives and rolling stock with newly built standardized equipment to speed up their freight operations, and it involved the introduction of the Erie's fleet of 2-8-4 "Berkshire" locomotives. In the mid-1930s, both Van Sweringen brothers died at an early age, before they could carry out any further plans they had for the Erie and their other railroads.

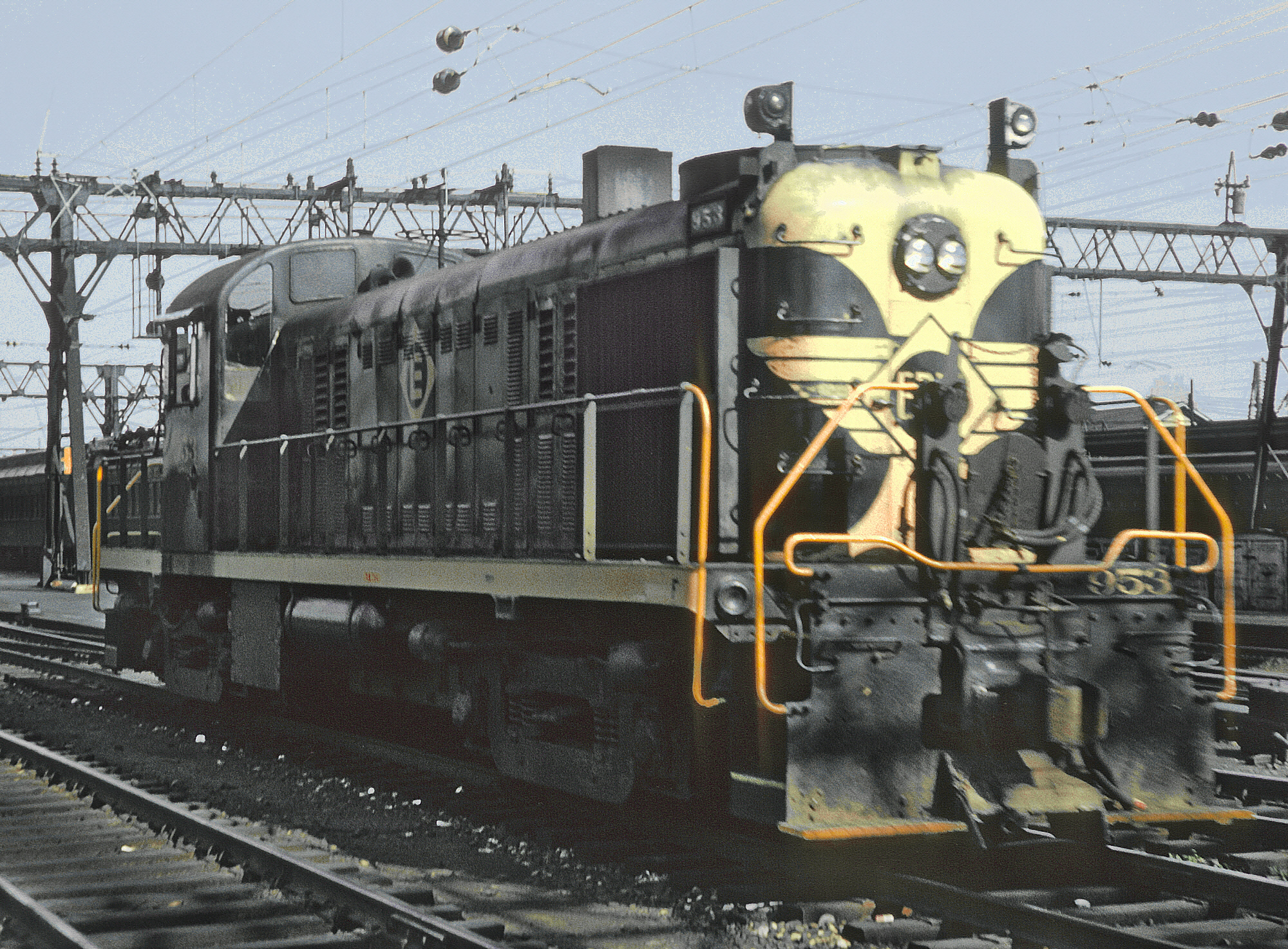
An ALCO RS-3 with Erie Lackawanna Railroad markings at Hoboken terminal, September 3, 1965

Despite the ravages of the Great Depression in the 1930s, the Erie managed to continue operations on their own, until they filed for bankruptcy again, on January 18, 1938. That same year, the Erie was involved in the U.S. Supreme Court case, the Erie Railroad Co. v. Tompkins. The Erie doctrine, which governs the application of state common law in federal courts, is still taught in American law schools, as of 2026. By December 1941, the Erie emerged from bankruptcy, following a reorganization process, which involved the purchase of the leased Cleveland and Mahoning Valley Railroad, swapping high rent for lower interest payments, and the purchase of formerly-subsidized and leased lines. In 1940, the NYS&W was spun-off from the Erie's control, as part of their own bankruptcy reorganization, and in the process, the Erie was entrusted ownership of their Susquehanna Connecting Railroad. The Erie's reorganization was deemed a success, since the railroad managed to pay dividends to their shareholders.

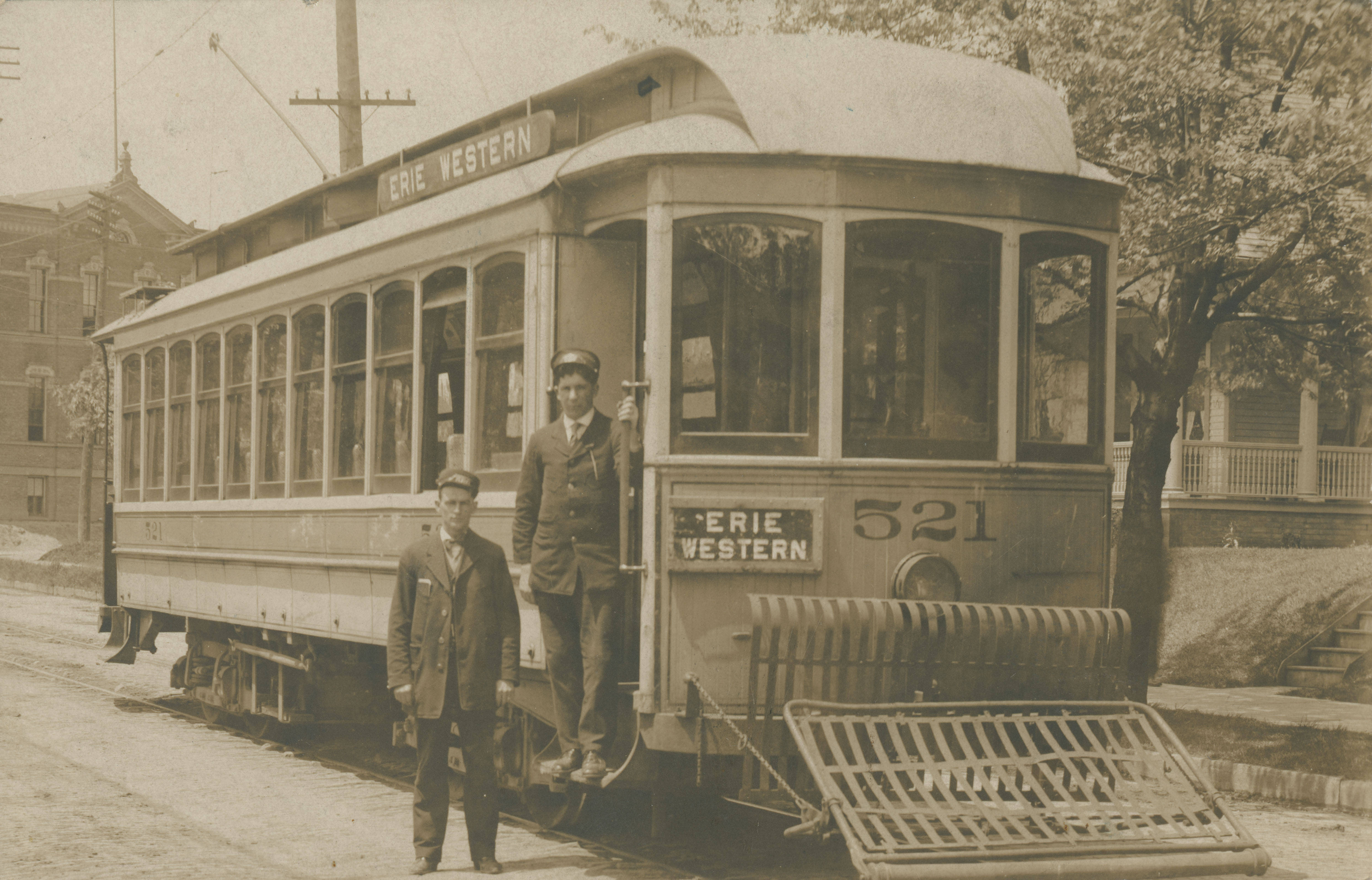
Erie Western Electric Railway, Toledo, Ohio

On September 15, 1948, the Cleveland Union Terminal Company allowed the Erie to use the Union Terminal adjacent to Terminal Tower in lieu of its old station. That same year, the Erie purchased a share of the Niagara Junction Railway, along with the New York Central and the Lehigh Valley. On March 17, 1954, the Erie completely dieselized its locomotive roster, when K-1 class 4-6-2 No. 2530 hauled the railroad's final steam-powered commuter train between Jersey City and Spring Valley, New York. Later that same year, the railroad launched trailer-on-flatcar (TOFC) services.

Erie Railroad prospered throughout the mid-1950s, but its profits were simultaneously on a decline. The company's 1957 income was half of that of 1956; by 1958 and 1959, Erie Railroad posted large deficits. The Erie's financial losses resulted in them entering negotiations to merge with the nearby Delaware, Lackawanna and Western. The proposed merger led to the abandonment of duplicate freight facilities in Binghamton and Elmira, New York. Between 1956 and 1957, the Erie shifted its passenger trains from its Pavonia Terminal to the DL&W's newer Hoboken Terminal. The DL&W also abandoned most of their mainline between Binghamton and Elmira, in favor of the Erie's parallel mainline, in 1958. The merger negotiations subsequently accelerated, and they briefly considered including the Delaware and Hudson Railroad (D&H); on October 17, 1960, the Erie and the DL&W merged to create the Erie Lackawanna Railway. However, the merged railroad only operated for sixteen years, before their financial decline forced them to be absorbed into Conrail in 1976. Some former Erie trackage between Hornell and Binghamton were damaged in 1972 by Hurricane Agnes. The Erie's large repair facility in Hornell was closed following Conrail's takeover, and operations were consolidated at the Lackawanna's Scranton facility.

Revenue freight traffic, in millions of net ton-miles.
Year	Traffic
1925	9,474
1933	6,318
1944	15,004
1960	8,789 (Note: Totals include Chicago & Erie and NJ&NY, but not NYS&W/WB&E or L&WV. Total for 1960 is Erie through 16 October and then Erie-Lackawanna.)

== Lines operated ==
Railroad	Branch	From	To	Approx. Mileage	Years Erie-Operated	Notes
Erie Railroad	Original Main Line	Piermont	Dunkirk	448 miles (721 km)	1841 - 1960	Construction began in 1836, and opened from Piermont to Goshen on September 23, 1841. After some financial problems, construction resumed in August, 1846, and the next section, to Port Jervis, opened on January 7, 1848. Further extensions opened to Binghamton December 27, 1848, Owego January 1, 1849, and the full length to Dunkirk May 19, 1851. At Dunkirk steamboats continued across Lake Erie to Detroit, Michigan.
Erie Railroad	Newburgh Branch	Main Line at Greycourt near Chester	Newburgh	18.6 miles (29.9 km)	January 8, 1850 - 1960 (Except five miles at the east end)	The Erie's charter was amended on April 8, 1845, to allow the building of the branch. This amendment was later used to spur the construction of a railroad line to the bustling port city of Newburgh, NY. Newburgh was once the site of coal piers owned by the Pennsylvania Coal Company and later served as a connection to the New York and New England Railroad via a car float operation across the river to Beacon, New York. When opened in 1850, it was Newburgh's first railroad. Today, the line is completely abandoned except for a small portion between Newburgh and Vails Gate that is used as an industrial spur.
Erie Railroad	Newburgh and New York Railroad (Newburgh Shortcut)	Newburgh Junction, near Harriman	Newburgh Branch at Vails Gate	12.7 miles (20.4 km)	July 1869 - 1936	Known as "the shortcut" because it was a more direct link between Newburgh and the southern section of the mainline when compared to the Newburgh Branch. When the Graham Line was constructed between 1906 and 1909, the first two to three miles of the "Shortcut" right of way were utilized and elevated to eliminate any grade crossings. Due to the decline of Newburgh's coal industry, the line was formally abandoned between 1936 and 1937. Parts of it remain in service today as Metro North's Port Jervis line and a short industrial spur in Vails Gate, NY, while others, like a small section in Highland Mills, NY, remain intact but abandoned.
Erie Railroad	Graham Line	Newburgh Junction, near Harriman	Otisville	42.3 miles (68.1 km)	1909 - 1960	Due to the steep grades, sharp curves, and numerous grade crossings of the Erie mainline between Harriman and Otisville, NY, the Graham Line was constructed between 1906 and 1909 as a freight bypass. In order to eliminate any grade crossings, the line was elevated considerably. Numerous local railroad marvels were built as a part of the Graham Line, such as the Moodna Viaduct and the Otisville Tunnel. The line remains in service today as the Metro-North Port Jervis Line.
Paterson and Ramapo Railroad	New Jersey Line	New York Line at Mahwah	Paterson	14.5 miles (23.3 km)	1852 - 1960	Opened as an independent company in 1848. Through ticketing began in 1851, with a required change of cars at Ramapo due to the gauge break. A third gauge rail was built by 1853.
Paterson and Ramapo Railroad	New York Line: Union Railroad	New Jersey Line at Suffern	Main Line in Suffern	0.82 miles (1.32 km)	1852 - 1960	Opened as an independent company in 1848. Through ticketing began in 1851, with a required change of cars at Ramapo due to the gauge break. A third gauge rail was built by 1853.
Paterson and Hudson River Railroad		Paterson	New Jersey Rail Road in Jersey City	15.7 miles (25.3 km)	1852 - 1960	Opened as an independent company in 1833. Through ticketing began in 1851. In November 1853, Erie stock began operating to the New Jersey Rail Road's Jersey City terminal after a third rail for wide gauge was finished.
Buffalo and New York City Railroad		Hornellsville	Buffalo	92.3 miles (148.5 km)	Leased November 17, 1852 – 1857; owned October 31, 1857 – 1859	Founded as the Attica and Hornellsville Railroad in 1845. In 1852, bought the Buffalo and Rochester Railroad's old alignment from Buffalo to Attica, and subsequently renamed itself to the Buffalo and New York City Railroad, and converted to the Erie's wide gauge. The Buffalo and New York City began leasing their track to the Erie upon the completion of their extension from Attica southeast to Hornellsville, opened on November 17, 1852, giving the Erie access to Buffalo, a better terminal than Dunkirk- thus it became a branch of the Erie's mainline. Upon the Erie's bankruptcy, sold line from Buffalo to Attica to the Buffalo, New York, and Erie.
Chemung Railroad		Horseheads	Watkins	16.7 miles (26.9 km)	Leased 1850–1853; 1857–1859	Upon independence of Canandaigua and Elmira, the Erie subleased the Chemung Railroad to the Canandaigua and Elmira. Reverted to the Erie in 1858 during the C&E's bankruptcy.
Elmira, Canandaigua and Niagara Falls Railroad		Watkins	Canandaigua	47.7 miles (76.8 km)	Leased 1851–1853; 1859–1866	Founded as the Canandaigua and Corning Railroad on May 14, 1845. Upon completion, was renamed to the Canandaigua and Elmira Railroad, and immediately leased to Erie. Upon independence from Erie, began subleasing the Chemung. Renamed to EC&NF 1857. Went bankrupt from 1858 to 1859, during which time the Chemung was leased to Erie. Reorganized in 1859 as Elmira, Jefferson and Canandaigua Railroad, at which time the Erie leased it again. In 1866 transferred to the Northern Central, and a third rail was built to allow the Northern Central's 4 ft 8 1/2 in (1,435 mm) standard gauge trains to operate over it.
Canandaigua and Niagara Falls Railroad		Canandaigua	North Tonawanda	86.5 miles (139.2 km)	Leased 1853 - 1858	Leased by the Canandaigua and Elmira to continue it beyond Canandaigua. When the line went bankrupt in 1858, it was reorganized as the Niagara Bridge and Canandaigua Railroad and was leased by New York Central Railroad. The NYC converted it to standard gauge and blocked the Erie from it.
Buffalo and Niagara Falls Railroad		North Tonawanda	Niagara Falls Suspension Bridge in Niagara Falls	12.2 miles (19.6 km)	Trackage rights 1853 - 1858	Trackage rights obtained by C&NF
Buffalo, Bradford and Pittsburgh Railroad Company		Erie Main Line at Carrollton	Gilesville (later Buttsville) in southeast Lafayette	25.97 miles (41.79 km)	February 26, 1859	Formed by the merger of two earlier railroads in northwest Pennsylvania for the Erie to acquire a source of fuel for its locomotives. Extended from Bradford to Gilesville, the site of a bituminous mine, by January 1, 1866.
New York, Lake Erie, and Western Coal and Railroad		BB&P in Lafayette	Johnsonburg	29.68 miles (47.77 km)	1882-	This section encompassed the once significant Kinzua Bridge: partially destroyed by a microburst "tornado" in by 2003.
Section of Pennsylvania Railroad		Johnsonburg	Brockway, Pennsylvania	27.76 miles (44.68 km)	Trackage rights 1897–1907	
Section of Buffalo, Rochester, and Pittsburgh Railway		Clarion Junction, north of Johnsonburg	Eleanora Junction (later Cramer), northeast of Stump Creek	50.67 miles (81.55 km)	Leased 1907-	
Eriton Railroad		Eriton Junction, SE of West Liberty	Eriton Mines, south of West Liberty	0.869 miles (1.399 km)	1908-(1940s)	
Buffalo, New York and Erie Railroad	Original Main Line	Erie Main Line at Corning	Buffalo	41.6 miles (66.9 km)	Leased 1863-	Created during the Erie's bankruptcy in 1858. Took over the Buffalo and New York City from Attica to Buffalo in 1859. Acquired the Buffalo, Corning and New York Railroad the same year and connected the two lines. Leased the Rochester and Genesee Valley Railroad in 1858.
Buffalo, New York and Erie Railroad	Rochester and Genesee Valley Railroad	BNY&E at Avon	Rochester	98.5 miles (158.5 km)	Leased 1863-	Completed 1853; leased to Buffalo, NY, and then Erie in 1858.
Avon, Geneseo and Mt. Morris Railroad		BNY&E at Avon	Mount Morris	15.3 miles (24.6 km)	Leased 1872-	Founded as Genesee Valley Company. Acquired land initially bought by Rochester and Genesee Valley in 1856. In 1859, reorganized as the AG&MM.
Atlantic and Great Western Railroad	Erie and New York City Railroad	Erie main line at Salamanca	Pennsylvania Line near Niobe in Harmony	47.7 miles (76.8 km)	1868–1880, 1874–1880, 1883–1960	Founded in 1862, as all three railroads merged were renamed in their respective states as the A&GW Railway. Reorganized as the New York, Pennsylvania and Ohio Railway in 1880
Atlantic and Great Western Railroad	Meadville Railroad	New York Line in Freehold Township	Ohio Line in South Pymatuning Township	87.9 miles (141.5 km)	1868–1880, 1874–1880, 1883–1960	Founded in 1862, as all three railroads merged were renamed in their respective states as the A&GW Railway. Reorganized as the New York, Pennsylvania and Ohio Railway in 1880
Atlantic and Great Western Railroad	Franklin and Warren Railroad	Pennsylvania Line in Orangeville	Dayton	250 miles (402 km)	1868–1880, 1874–1880, 1883–1960	Founded in 1862, as all three railroads merged were renamed in their respective states as the A&GW Railway. Reorganized as the New York, Pennsylvania and Ohio Railway in 1880
Atlantic and Great Western Railroad	Oil City Branch	At Meadville near Meadville	Oil City	33.3 miles (53.6 km)	1868–1880, 1874–1880, 1883–1960	Founded in 1862, as all three railroads merged were renamed in their respective states as the A&GW Railway. Reorganized as the New York, Pennsylvania and Ohio Railway in 1880
Suspension Bridge and Erie Junction Railroad		Buffalo	Niagara Falls Suspension Bridge in Niagara Falls	23.2 miles (37.3 km)	1871-	Chartered by Erie in 1868 to restore access to the Niagara Falls Suspension Bridge
Erie International Railway		International Junction in Buffalo	International Bridge	4.86 miles (7.82 km)		Erie-chartered in 1872
Lockport and Buffalo Railway		Tonawanda	Lockport	13.1 miles (21.1 km)	1879	Erie-chartered in 1871
Jefferson Railroad	Main Line	Lanesboro	Carbondale	37.5 miles (60.4 km)	1870-1960	As far back as 1840, there had been a number of attempts to build a railroad from the Erie mainline to the Wyoming Valley of Pennsylvania. The Jefferson was incorporated in 1851 by the Pennsylvania legislature, which squashed local attempts to build a line on that route.
Jefferson Railroad	Edgerton Branch	Mayfield	Coal mines of Hosie and Park	1.5 miles (2.4 km)	1884-1910	Abandoned 1910
Jefferson Railroad	Honesdale Branch	Erie and Wyoming Valley at Hawley	Honesdale	9.03 miles (14.53 km)	1869-1960	Built to create a more direct connection from the Jefferson's southern terminus at Carbondale to points east via the E&WV and the Delaware and Hudson Gravity Railroad (though the two companies' rails were not explicitly linked)
Erie and Wyoming Valley Railroad	Main Line	Lackawaxen	Plains Junction in Wilkes-Barre	63.8 miles (102.7 km)	1863-1960	
Erie and Wyoming Valley Railroad	Jefferson Railroad Connection	E&WV Mainline	Jessup	7.72 miles (12.42 km)		
Erie and Wyoming Valley Railroad	DL&W and WB&E Connection	Plains Junction in Wilkes-Barre	Ashley	11.3 miles (18.2 km)		
Erie and Wyoming Valley Railroad	Scranton Branch	E&WV main line	Scranton	2.4 miles (3.9 km)		
Erie and Wyoming Valley Railroad	Jones Lake Railroad	Manning Junction	Lake Ariel	2.142 miles (3.447 km)	1888-	
Susquehanna Connecting Railroad		Suscon Junction	Old Forge	7.72 miles (12.42 km)	June, 1938 -	Consolidated from existing railroads
Delaware and Hudson Railroad		Carbondale	Moosic	24.1 miles (38.8 km)	1900(?)-	Connected the Erie and Wyoming Valley and the Jefferson
Moosic Mountain and Carbondale Railroad		Throop	Jessup	3.43 miles (5.52 km)	1888-	
Buffalo and Jamestown Railroad		Jamestown	Buffalo	57.3 miles (92.2 km)	1881-	Chartered in 1872 to connect the A&GW with the Erie mainline. Soon after the line was completed in 1873, the company was reorganized as the Buffalo and Southwest Railroad.
Chicago and Erie Railroad	Main Line	Marion	Illinois Line at Hammond	249 miles (401 km)	1895-	Founded in 1871 as the Chicago and Atlantic Railway and went into bankruptcy in 1890.
Chicago and Erie Railroad	Chicago and Western Indiana Railroad	Indiana Line at Calumet City	Chicago	19 miles (31 km)	1895-	Already owned by C&E in joint ownership with 4 other companies
New York, Susquehanna, and Western Railway	Main Line	Jersey City	Stroudsburg	100.7 miles (162.1 km)	1898-1940	American financier J.P. Morgan began to take notice of the railroad, which by the 1890s had become a rapidly expanding coal-hauler; he quietly bought up its stock on behalf of the Erie. The railroad was leased, and soon after took over complete operation of the line. The depression caused the bankruptcy of the NYSW, which was spun off as a private company in 1940, working closely with the NYO&W.
New York, Susquehanna, and Western Railway	Erie Terminals Railroad	Ridgefield	Edgewater	3.74 miles (6.02 km)	1898-1940	American financier J.P. Morgan began to take notice of the railroad, which by the 1890s had become a rapidly expanding coal-hauler; he quietly bought up its stock on behalf of the Erie. The railroad was leased, and soon after took over complete operation of the line. The depression caused the bankruptcy of the NYSW, which was spun off as a private company in 1940, working closely with the NYO&W.
New York, Susquehanna, and Western Railway	Middletown Branch	Ogdensburg	Middletown	33.8 miles (54.4 km)	1898-1940	American financier J.P. Morgan began to take notice of the railroad, which by the 1890s had become a rapidly expanding coal-hauler; he quietly bought up its stock on behalf of the Erie. The railroad was leased, and soon after took over complete operation of the line. The depression caused the bankruptcy of the NYSW, which was spun off as a private company in 1940, working closely with the NYO&W.
New York, Susquehanna, and Western Railway	Wilkes-Barre and Eastern Railroad	Stroudsburg	Plains	64.4 miles (103.6 km)	1898-1939	Since the Erie chose to send all of its traffic along the Erie and Wyoming Valley, the line was doomed to failure, and was abandoned in 1939.
New York, Susquehanna, and Western Railway	Lodi Branch Railroad	Teterboro	Lodi	0.996 miles (1.603 km)	1883- 1898	
New York, Susquehanna, and Western Railway	Hackensack and Lodi Railroad	Hackensack	Lodi	1.403 miles (2.258 km)	1898-1940	
New York, Susquehanna, and Western Railway	Macopin Railroad	Macopin Lake Junction in Charlottesburg	Macopin Pond (Echo Lake) in West Milford	1.533 miles (2.467 km)	1887-1940	
Bath and Hammondsport Railroad		Bath	Hammondsport	8.2 miles (13.2 km)	1903-1935	After a flood in 1935, the line was purchased by locals who renamed it the B&H Railroad.
Cleveland and Mahoning Railroad	Main Line	Cleveland	Youngstown	68.4 miles (110.1 km)	1941-	
Cleveland and Mahoning Railroad	Hubbard Branch	Youngstown	Pennsylvania Line in Masury	12.1 miles (19.5 km)	1941-	
Cleveland and Mahoning Railroad	Niles and New Lisbon Railroad	Niles	Lisbon	33.1 miles (53.3 km)	1941-	
Sharon Railway	Main Line	West Middlesex	Pymatuning Township	13.6 miles (21.9 km)	C&MV owned	During construction absorbed Sharpsville, Wheatland, Sharon and Greenfield Railroad in 1881
Sharon Railway	Westerman Coal and Iron Railroad	Ohio Line in Sharon	Wheatland	1.5 miles (2.4 km)		
Sharon Railway	New Castle and Shenango Valley Railroad	West Middlesex	New Castle	16.1 miles (25.9 km)	1900-	
Tioga Railroad	Northern Extension	Pennsylvania Line in Lindley	Corning	11.392 miles (18.334 km)	1876-	
Tioga Railroad	Corning and Blossburg Railroad	New York Line in Lawrenceville	Blossburg	27.00 miles (43.45 km)	1882-	Chartered under the Tioga Navigation Company
Tioga Railroad	Southern Extension	Blossburg	Morris Run	3.592 miles (5.781 km)	1853-	
Goshen and Deckertown Railway		Goshen	Pine Island	11.3 miles (18.2 km)	1872-	Operated independently 1869-1872
Wallkill Valley Railroad		Montgomery	Kingston	33.0 miles (53.1 km)	1866-1876	
New York and Greenwood Lake Railroad	Main Line	Jersey City	Sterling Forest	41.2 miles (66.3 km)	1878-	Company formed under Erie as reorganization of the Montclair and Greenwood Lake Railway. Parts were realigned due to the creation of the Wanaque Reservoir
New York and Greenwood Lake Railroad	Ringwood Branch	Main Line	Ringwood	3.8 miles (6.1 km)	1878-	Company formed under Erie as reorganization of the Montclair and Greenwood Lake Railway. Parts were realigned due to the creation of the Wanaque Reservoir
New York and Greenwood Lake Railroad	Arlington Railroad	Main Line	Newark and Hudson near Hackensack River	1.128 miles (1.815 km)	1890-	Built to offer a more direct connection with Jersey City
New York and Greenwood Lake Railroad	Orange Branch	Newark	Orange	4.04 miles (6.50 km)	1895-	Founded as Watchung Railway
New York and Greenwood Lake Railroad	Caldwell Branch	Little Falls	Caldwell	5.51 miles (8.87 km)	1897-	Founded as Caldwell Railway and the Roseland Railway
Paterson and Newark Railroad		Jersey City	Paterson	16.5 miles (26.6 km)	1869-	Founded 1864 as Erie subsidiary
New Jersey and New York Railroad		Rutherford	Nanuet	20.7 miles (33.3 km)	1896-	Founded as Hackensack and New York Railroad in 1856
Northern Railroad of New Jersey		Sparkill	Jersey City	26.8 miles (43.1 km)	1859-	Founded 1854 as Erie subsidiary
Nyack and Southern Railroad		Nyack	Piermont	4.343 miles (6.989 km)	1870-	
Middletown and Crawford Railroad		Middletown	Pine Bush	11.3 miles (18.2 km)	1882-	Chartered 1868. Completed in 1872 under lease of the New York and Oswego Midland Railroad; spun off as a private company 1875.
Montgomery and Erie Railroad		Goshen	Montgomery	10.1 miles (16.3 km)	1872-	Built to connect to the Wallkill Valley Railroad
Arnot and Pine Creek Railroad		Arnot	Hoytville	11.4 miles (18.3 km)	1883-	
Bergen County Railroad	Main Line	Glen Rock	East Rutherford	9.8 miles (15.8 km)	1883-	
Bergen County Railroad	Bergen and Dundee Railroad	Garfield	Passaic	1.1 miles (1.8 km)	1885-	
Columbus and Ohio Railroad		Columbus	Niobe	13.1 miles (21.1 km)	1908-	
Conesus Lake Railroad		Avon	Lakeville	1.4 miles (2.3 km)	1882-	
Long Dock Company		Croxton	Docks at Jersey City	2.882 miles (4.638 km)	1861-	
Docks Connecting Railroad			New Jersey Junction Railroad in Jersey City	0.916 miles (1.474 km)	1886-	
New York and Fort Lee Railroad		Long Dock Tunnel in Jersey City	West New York		1870-1886	Assumed part of the former Morris and Essex line from the Long Dock Tunnel. The line was transferred to the New Jersey Junction Railroad in 1886, with the Erie keeping a lease on the former Fort Lee line south of Weehawken. Connection to the Long Dock Tunnel was kept as the Docks Connecting Railroad
New York, Lake Erie and Western Docks and Improvement Company		New Jersey Junction Railroad in Weehawken	Hudson River	26.895 miles (43.283 km)	1881-	Track composed entirely of siding; maximum distance from junction with NJJ is just over half a mile. Accessed via the Docks Connecting Railroad and a lease over the New Jersey Junction Railroad
Elmira State Line Railroad		Elmira	Pennsylvania Line in Pine City	6.503 miles (10.466 km)	1876-	
Erie and Black Rock Railroad		Black Rock Junction in Black Rock	Docks at Black Rock	1.455 miles (2.342 km)	1883-	
Penhorn Creek Railroad		Jersey Avenue in Jersey City	Seacaucus	5.422 miles (8.726 km)	1910-	
West Clarion Railroad		Brockway	West Clarion	2.646 miles (4.258 km)	1898-1925	
Youngstown and Austintown Railroad	Main Line	Youngstown	Austintown	3.777 miles (6.078 km)	1882-	Parts constructed by the Youngstown Railroad Company and the Wicks and Wells Railroad
Youngstown and Austintown Railroad	Manning Branch	Main Line in Austintown	Tippecanoe Shaft in Austintown	6.088 miles (9.798 km)	1882-	

A map from 1960 shows that the Erie had some control over the former Cleveland, Columbus, Cincinnati and Indianapolis Railway and the New York Central from Lawrenceville to Newberry Junction, near Williamsport, PA.

== Passenger service ==
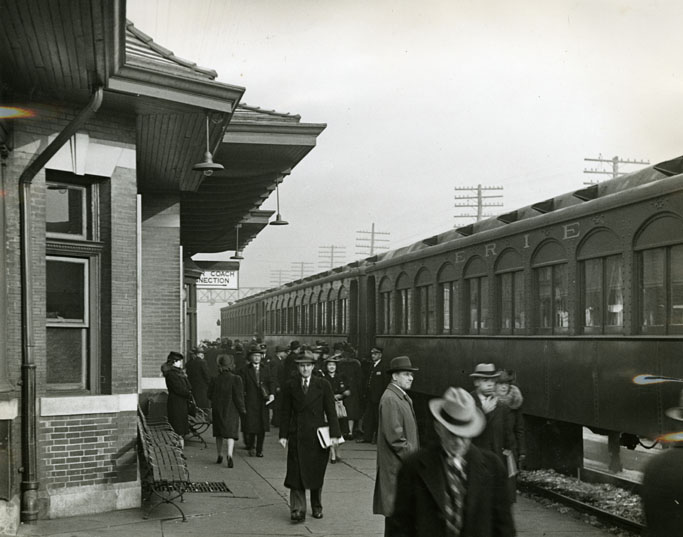
Erie Railroad passengers at Rutherford station, circa 1940

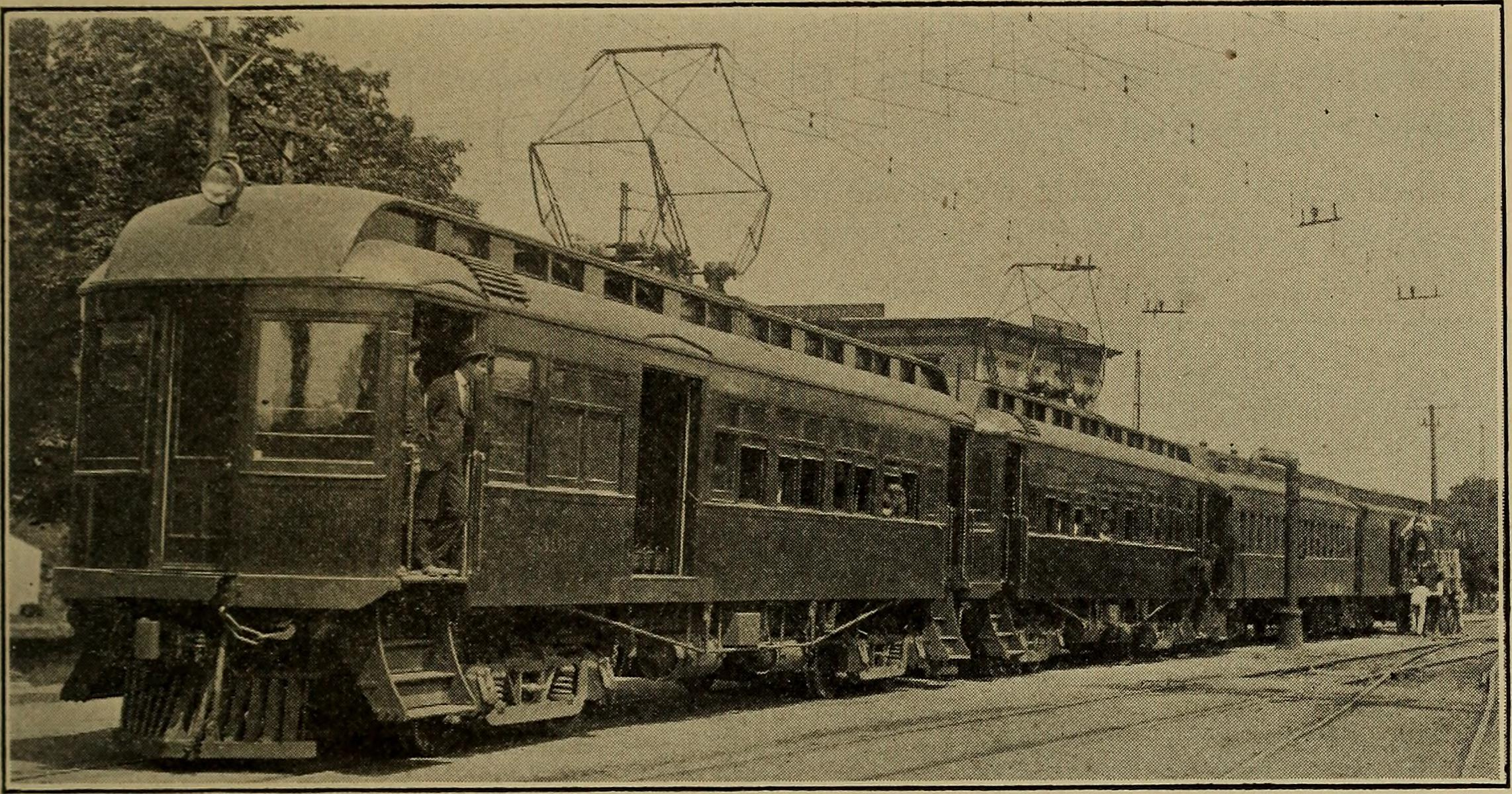
One of the Erie's electric commuter trains on its Rochester Branch, ca. 1911

The Erie Railroad operated a number of named passenger trains, although none were as well-known or successful as others like the Pennsylvania Railroad's Broadway Limited or New York Central Railroad's 20th Century Limited. Some of the Erie's most well known trains included the Erie Limited, Lake Cities, Pacific Express, Atlantic Express, Midlander, Southern Tier Express and Mountain Express. All of these had their western termini in Chicago, except the Mountain Express which terminated in Hornell, in the Southern Tier of New York.

The Erie operated an extensive network of commuter routes in northern New Jersey and the lower Hudson Valley of New York. Most of these routes became part of Conrail along with the rest of Erie Lackawanna's rail operations in 1976. The New Jersey routes are now part of NJ Transit's Hoboken Division, originating and terminating at Hoboken Terminal. The Hudson Valley routes are now part of Metro-North Railroad.

In addition to its steam and diesel services the Erie also operated an electric commuter rail line to its terminal station in Rochester, New York. The station was one of the Erie's few electrified railroad stations, and the railroad became one of the first to provide electric commuter services in 1907.

== Company officers ==
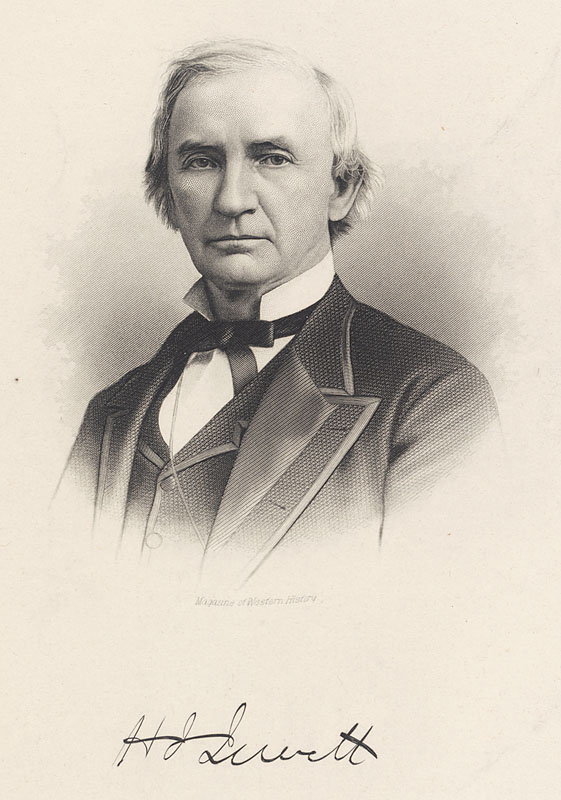
Hugh J. Jewett, President 1874–1884.

- Eleazer Lord (1833–35), (1839–41), (1844–45)
- James Gore King (1835–1839)
- James Bowen (1841–1842)
- William Maxwell (1842–1843)
- Horatio Allen (1843–1844)
- Benjamin Loder (1845–1853)
- Homer Ramsdell (1853–1857)
- Charles Moran (1857–1859)
- Samuel Marsh (1859–1861), (1864)
- Nathaniel Marsh (1861–1864)
- Robert H. Berdell (1864–1867)
- John S. Eldridge (1867–1868)
- Jay Gould (1868–1872)
- John A. Dix (1872)
- Peter H. Watson (1872–1874)
- Hugh J. Jewett (1874–1884)
- John King (1884–1894)
- Eben B. Thomas (1894–1901)
- Frederick Douglas Underwood (1901–1926)
- John Joseph Bernet (1927–1929)
- Charles Eugene Denney (1929–1939)
- Robert Eastman Woodruff (1941–1949)
- Paul W. Johnston (1949–1956)
- Harry W. Von Willer (1956–1960)

== Heritage unit ==
As part of the 30th anniversary of Norfolk Southern Railway being formed, NS decided to paint 20 new locomotives into the paint scheme of predecessor railroads. NS #1068, an EMD SD70ACe, was painted into Erie Railroad's green passenger scheme. It was released on May 25, 2012.

In October 2023, as part of the 40th Anniversary of NJ Transit Rail Operations, EMD GP40PH-2B No. 4210 was painted into the Erie Railroad's black-and-yellow scheme.

== See also ==
- List of Erie Railroad locomotives
- List of Erie Railroad structures documented by the Historic American Engineering Record
