= Tioga Railroad =

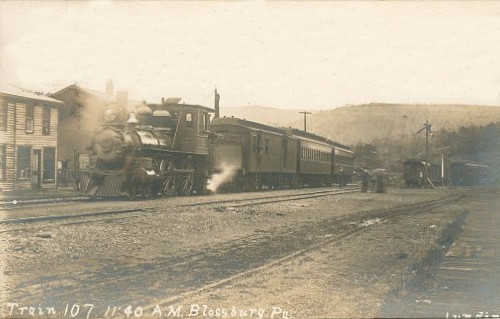
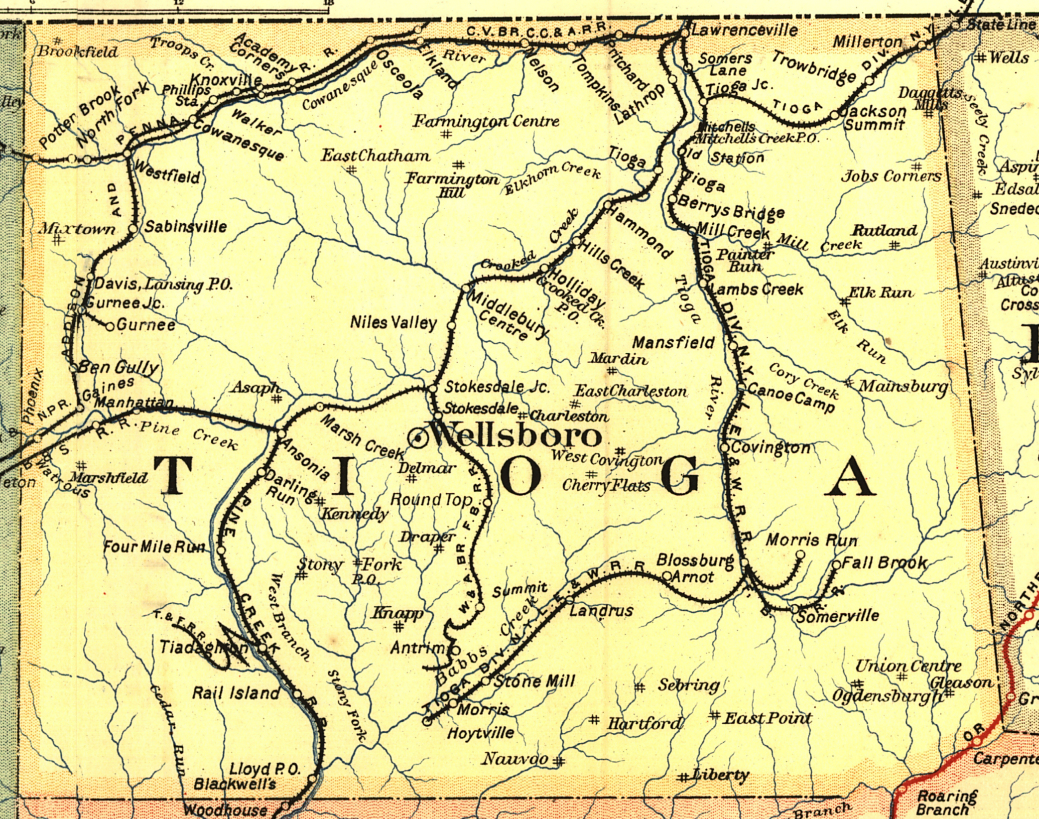
- Train 107 at 11:40 a.m. in Blossburg, Pennsylvania Tioga County railroad map, 1895

Technical
- Line length: 42 miles (67.6 km)
- Track gauge: Initially: 6 ft (1,829 mm); Since 1876: 4 ft 8 1/2 in (1,435 mm)

The Tioga Railroad was a railway in Pennsylvania owned and operated by the Tioga Railroad Company, the successor of the Tioga Navigation Company. The Tioga Railroad corporation had its principal office at Susquehanna, Pennsylvania. The property of the Tioga Railroad was operated by its own organization from about 1852 to about 1885, and by other companies until 1917 until the United States Railroad Administration assumed control in 1918.

== Railway ==
The Tioga Railway was a single-track line, located entirely within the US state of Pennsylvania. It extended from the New York–Pennsylvania state line to Blossburg with branches projecting from Tioga Junction to Lawrenceville and from Blossburg to Morris Run, aggregating 42.897 miles. This property formed a part of the main line between State Line Junction, near Elmira, New York and Hoytville, Pennsylvania

The property of the Tioga Railroad was operated by its own organization from about 1852 to about 1885. From that date to December 1, 1895, the property was operated by The New York, Lake Erie and Western Railroad Company and its receivers, and from the latter date to December 31, 1917, the property was operated by the Erie Railroad. The common-carrier property of this company was taken over for operation by the United States Railroad Administration on January 1, 1918, as part of the system of the Erie, and it is so operated on date of valuation.

=== Development of fixed physical property ===
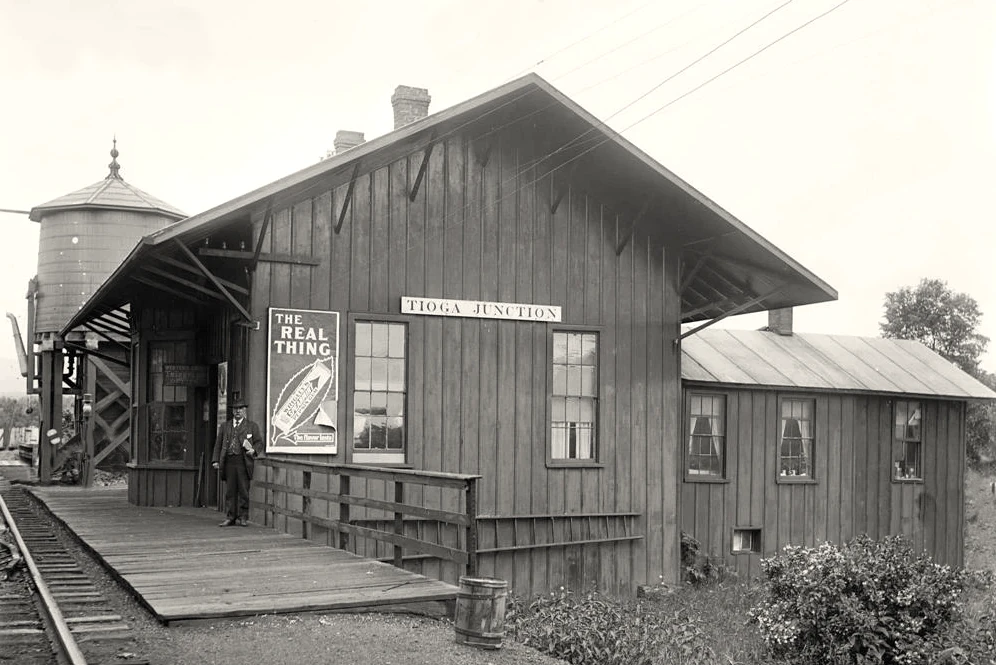
Tioga Junction railway station, ca 1910

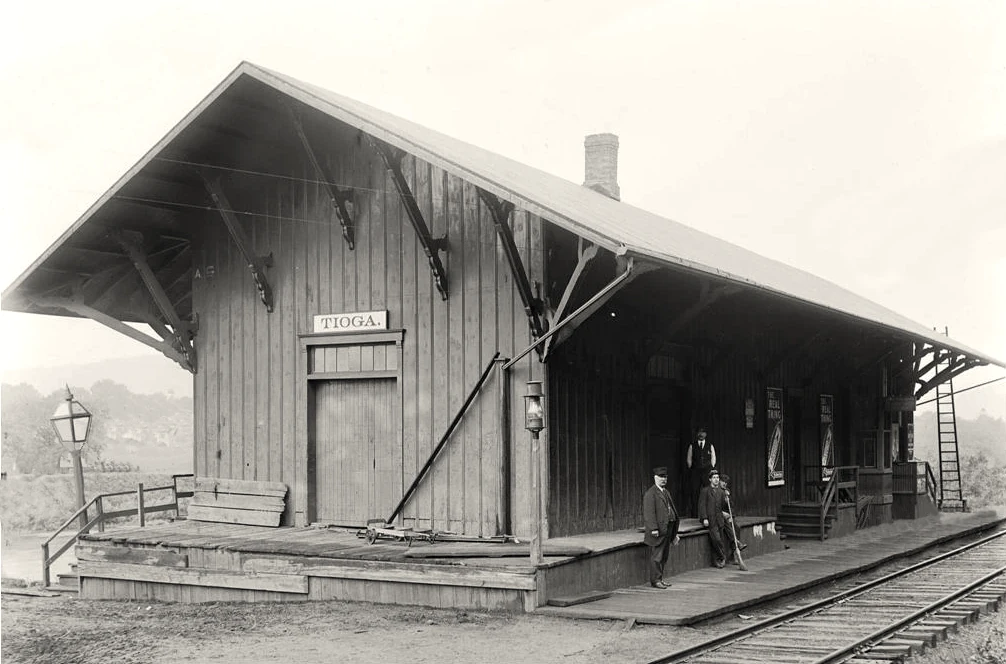
Tioga railway station, ca 1910

The 42.897 miles (69.036 km) of owned railway of the Tioga Railroad was acquired partly by virtue of corporate-right succession and partly by construction. The years when the various portions of the line were constructed and the manner in which the Tioga Railroad acquired the property are indicated in the following statement:

	Milage	
From The Tioga Navigation Company about 1852, constructed by that company:		
Point near Lawrenceville to Blossburg, Pa., prior to 1841		27.000
Acquired by construction:		
Blossburg to Morris Run, Pa., 1853	3.592	
Tioga Junction to New York-Pennsylvania State line, 1876	11.392	
Extension Morris Run branch, 1901-1902	.282	
		15.266
		42.266
Less portion of Morris Run branch abandoned in 1913		.261
Total recorded mileage		42.005

In the construction of the road built by the Tioga Railroad, the line extending from Blossburg to Morris Run., was constructed under contract by Gulick and Brewer, contractors. It was not determined by whom the line extending from Tioga Junction to the New York-Pennsylvania State line was constructed. The extension of the Morris branch [sic] was constructed by forces of the Erie.

From Elmira the rail track rose by a grade of about 70 feet to the mile to the summit and the descent of 6 miles to Tioga Junction was about 100 feet to the mile. There were two notable iron trestles on the railroad, one at Alder Run, 732 feet long and 70 feet high and the Stony Fork trestle which was 480 feet long and 50 feet high.

=== Leased railway property ===
The property of the company, together with the property of The Arnot and Pine Creek Railroad Company and the Elmira State Line Railroad, which it held under lease, was operated by the Erie and its predecessors, from about 1885, to December 31, 1917. The common-carrier property of the Tioga Railroad is operated on date of valuation by the United States Railroad Administration in 1931 as part of the system of the Erie. Details with respect to the operation of this property are given in the chapter on leased railway property in the report on the Erie.

=== Closure ===
Only two freight trains—one in each direction—have served customers of the railroad during World War II. The last train to serve stations of Pine City, Seeley Creek, Millerton, Trowbridge and Jackson Summit along the Tioga Division. Erie Railroad left the Erie freight station, Elmira, at 11:30 on Monday, August 10, 1942. The Interstate Commerce Commission directed that the line between Elmira and Tioga Junction be discontinued. No special observance of the last trip had been planned, it was stated at the office of the Division Superintendent in Hornell. The rolling stock continued to be in service, operating between Corning, over the New York Central Railroad, to Lawrenceville and Tioga Junction, then over Erie right of way to Tioga, Mansfield, Blossburg, Morris Run and Hoytville. Removal of the rails, bridges and trestles at Alder Run and Trowbridge started within a few days. The metal was sold for scrap.

== Company ==
=== Introduction ===
The Tioga Railroad was a corporation of the State of Pennsylvania, having its principal office at Susquehanna, PA. The accounting records of the Tioga Railroad are so incomplete and fragmentary that nothing of value could be obtained from them regarding its financial dealings, corporate operations, or investments. However, certain data indicated hereinafter were obtained from a balance sheet statement as of date of valuation, certified by the comptroller of the company, filed with us, and from other sources.

The Tioga Railroad was controlled by the Erie through ownership of a majority of its outstanding capital stock. The records reviewed do not indicate that this company controls any common-carrier corporation.

=== Corporate history ===
==== Predecessor company ====
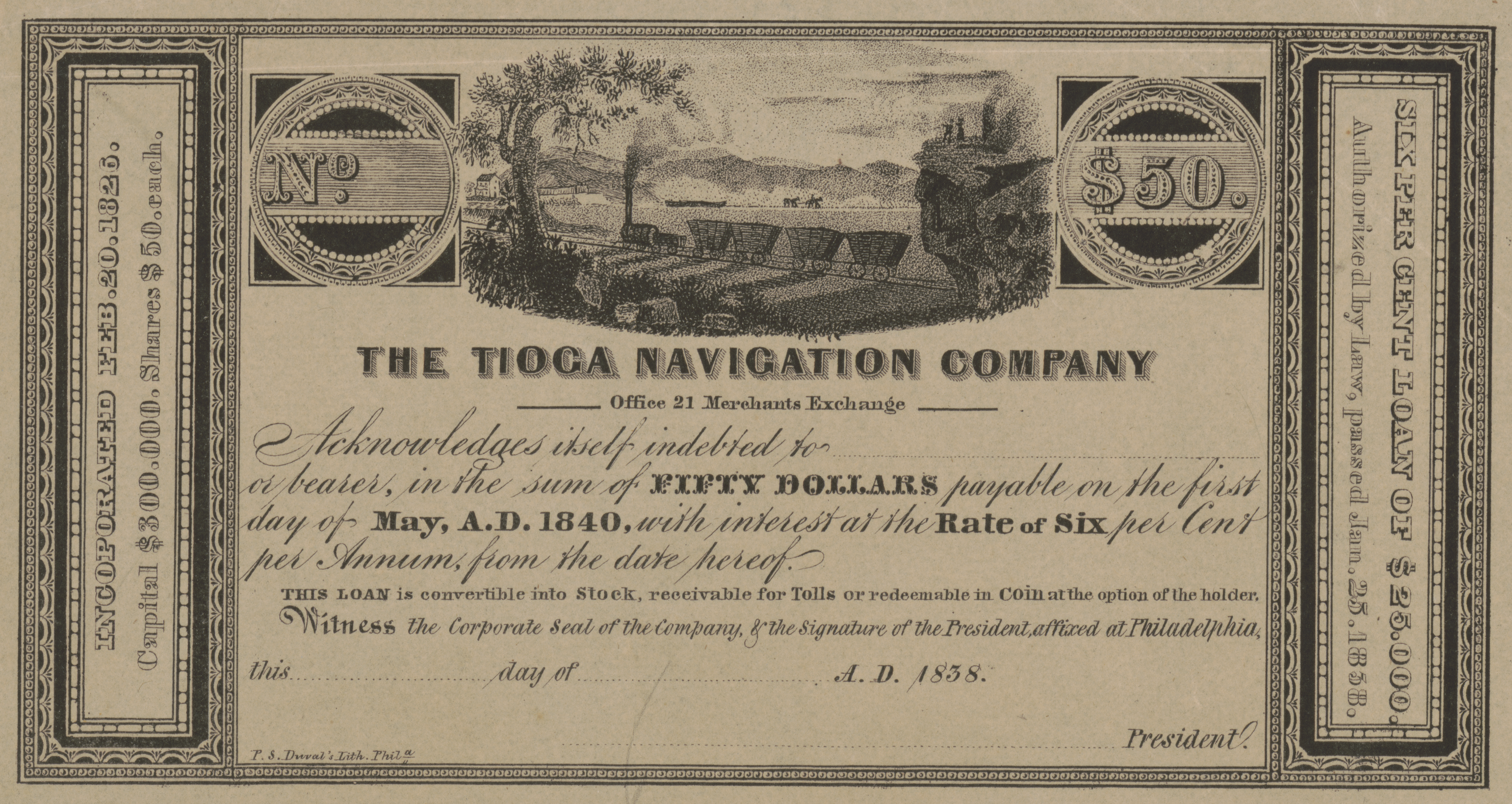
The Tioga Navigation Company - Office at 21 Merchants Exchange - May 1, 1840

The Interstate Commerce Commission could not obtain sufficient accounting records of this company before 1931. Therefore, no information could be given from its accounts regarding its financial dealings, corporate operations, or investments. Certain information stated below was obtained from a history of the Erie System, compiled by George H. Minor. The records reviewed did not indicate whether The Tioga Navigation Company was controlled by any individual or corporation on the date of its demise, about 1852, exact date unknown, nor, on the other hand, whether it controlled any common carrier corporation.

The railroad owned by the company consisted of 27 miles of single-track, steam railroad, extending from the Pennsylvania-New York State line, near Lawrenceville to Blossburg, Pa. This property was all acquired by construction. The records reviewed did not indicate whether the construction work was per formed by forces of the company or by contract. Further details with respect to the construction of this property are given in the chapter on development of fixed physical property in the report on the Tioga Railroad.

==== Incorporation ====
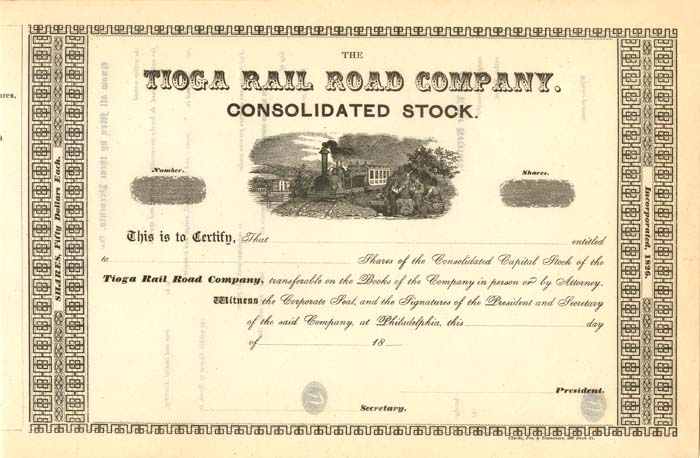
Tioga Rail Road Company consolidated stock

The Tioga Railroad was incorporated April 6, 1850, under special act of the Legislature of Pennsylvania for the purpose of reorganizing The Tioga Navigation Company and succeeding to the property, rights, and franchises of that company. The latter company was incorporated February 20, 1826, under special act of the Legislature of Pennsylvania, and its property, rights, and franchises passed to the Tioga Railroad about 1852, by right of corporate succession. The date of organization was January 5, 1852.

=== Rolling stock ===
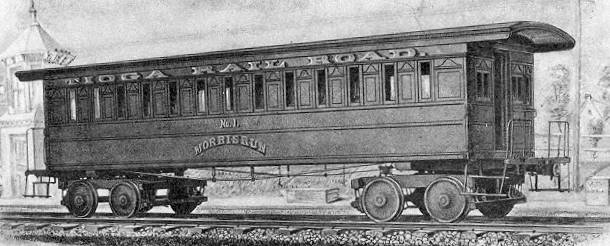
Eight-wheeled passenger car built in for the Tioga Railroad, by Harlan & Hollingsworth

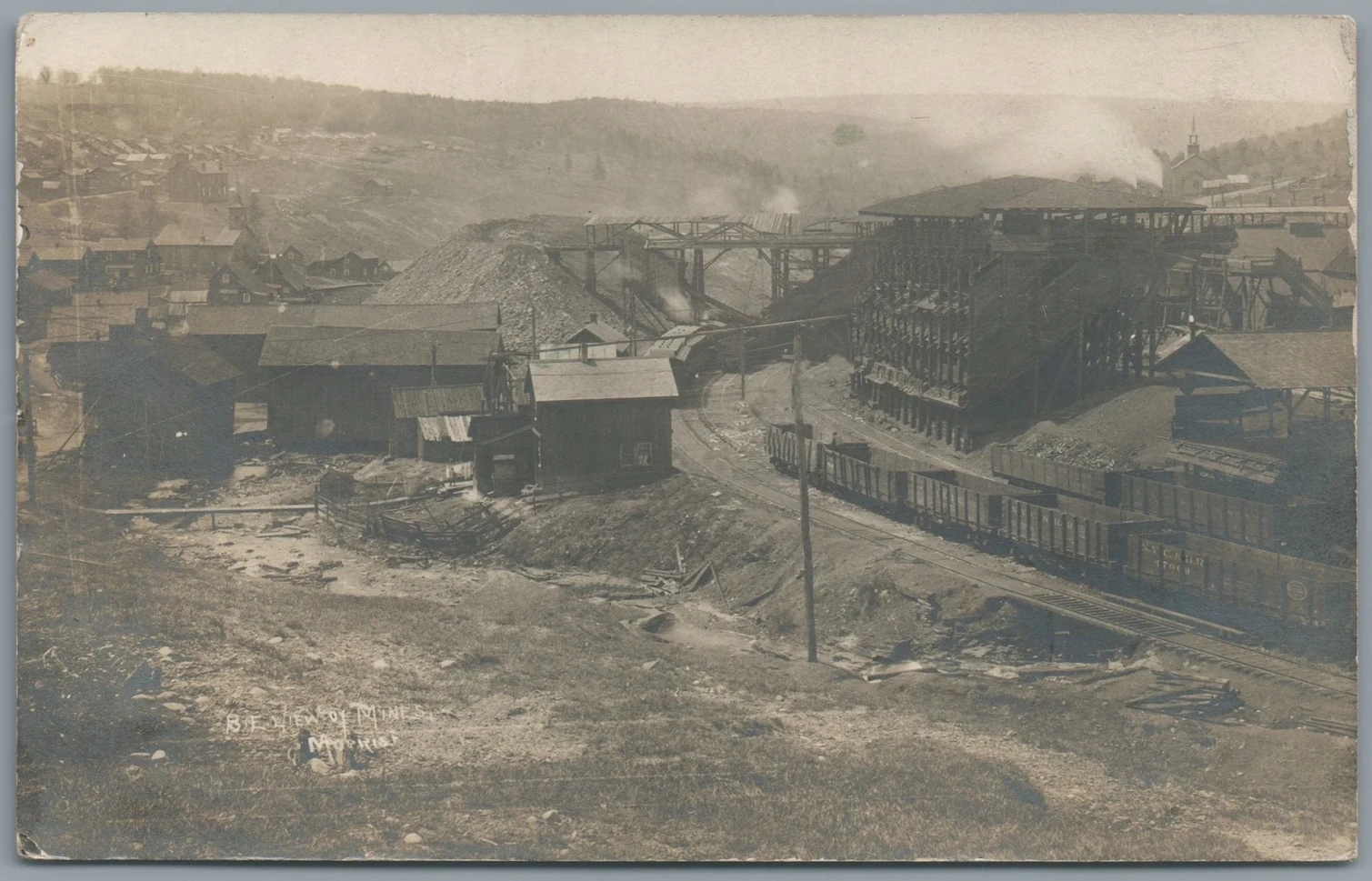
Coal wagons at Morris Run, 1909

The Harlan & Hollingsworth Company built an eight-wheeled passenger car for the Tioga Railroad. It had been in service for a very long time up to the Chicago Railway Exhibition of 1883, and it showed that marked progress had been made since its construction, as it lacked a number of useful modern features. The National Car Builder reported about it in 1883:

The seats are of the same pattern as the common seats of to-day. Their frames are iron and their arms of walnut, the upholstering being plain and of leather. The body of the car has the following dimensions, viz.: 8 feet 4 inches by 6 feet 4 inches by 36 feet. The timbers are about the same as those put in to-day, excepting that the end sills are mortised into the side sills. The body is supported by no springs aside from the ordinary rubbers in the pedestals. On the original trucks, which served for twenty-eight years, the wheels were outside of the bearings. The car is fitted with the ordinary freight drawbar and chain brakes. The only ventilation afforded is that by means of a 10-inch flue in the centre of the car. Light is supplied by two candles, one in each end of the car. There are no closets, lavatories, or water coolers in the car. One stove is furnished in the winter. A curious feature about the windows is that they do not raise, the panels between the windows being raised instead. This feature is, we believe, still to be found upon some other roads. This antique car originally cost $2,000, and has a recorded mileage of 1,100,000 miles.

== See also ==
- Tioga Central Railroad
- Erie Railroad
