= Tioga Navigation Company =

19th-century Pennsylvania transportation company

- Company type: Public
- Industry: Transportation
- Founded: February 20, 1826
- Fate: Reorganized as Tioga Railroad
- Successor: Tioga Railroad
- Headquarters: Blossburg, Pennsylvania, United States

The Tioga Navigation Company was incorporated on February 20, 1826, under a special act of the Legislature of Pennsylvania, with the aim of constructing improved river navigation or a canal to facilitate the shipment of coal from the Blossburg coal fields to markets near the New York state line. Its property, rights, and franchises passed to the Tioga Railroad on January 5, 1852, by right of corporate succession.

Coal had first been discovered in the Tioga region near Blossburg around 1792, with mining operations beginning as early as 1815. By the late 1820s, two transportation companies had been established to bring coal to market: the Tioga Navigation Company (Pennsylvania charter, 1826) and the Tioga Coal, Iron, Mining & Manufacturing Company (New York charter, 1828), which later became the Corning and Blossburg Railroad.

== History ==
=== Charter and early development (1826–1840) ===
The Tioga Navigation Company was chartered by the Pennsylvania Legislature on February 20, 1826, with the goal of improving navigation along the Tioga River to transport coal from Blossburg to northern markets. Initial plans for a canal proved impractical due to technical challenges and the unpredictable river conditions, leading the company to pivot toward rail construction.

On January 10, 1839, the contracting firm Colket & Stearns was hired to build a rail line from Blossburg to the state line. By 1839–1840, rail service had been completed from Blossburg, Pennsylvania, to Lawrenceville at the New York border, connecting with the Corning and Blossburg Railroad and the Chemung Canal.

The company's first steam locomotive, named Tioga, was built around 1839 by Baldwin Locomotive Works in Philadelphia.

=== Railroad Era and expansion (1840–1852) ===
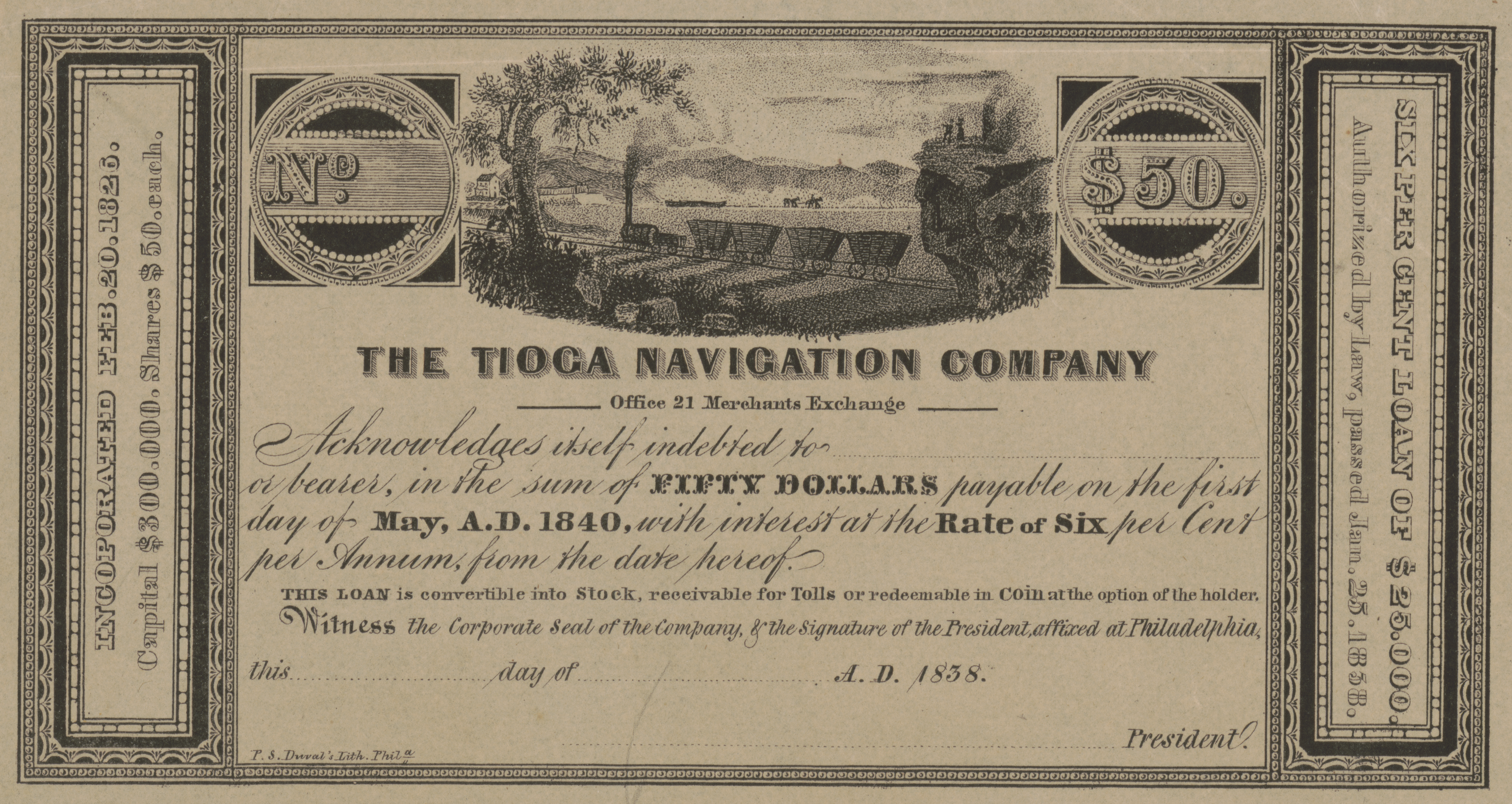
The Tioga Navigation Company - office 21 Merchants Exchange - acknowledges itself indebted for (blank) or bearer, in the sum of fifty dollars payable on the first day of May, A.D. 1840

In 1850, the Tioga Navigation Company was reorganized as the Tioga Railroad, incorporated under a special act of the Legislature of Pennsylvania for the purpose of succeeding to the Navigation Company's property, rights, and franchises. A four-mile branch from Blossburg to Morris Run was completed in 1852–53, opening access to additional coal fields.

=== Tioga Railroad and corporate succession (1850–1882) ===
The Tioga Railroad formally assumed control of the Tioga Navigation Company on January 5, 1852. Over the following decades, it expanded its reach with branch lines and extensions into New York. In 1882, the Erie Railroad acquired the Tioga Railroad and designated it as its Tioga Division.

=== Decline and legacy (1972–present) ===
The Tioga Division remained in operation for freight and passenger services until Tropical Storm Agnes struck in late June 1972, causing widespread flooding across Pennsylvania and New York. Severe damage to the Erie Lackawanna Railroad's infrastructure led to the abandonment of many lines, including much of the former Tioga route.

Portions of the historic route have since been repurposed for freight operations and excursion rail services by various regional operators.
