= Morris Run, Pennsylvania =

Unincorporated community in Pennsylvania, US

- Unincorporated community
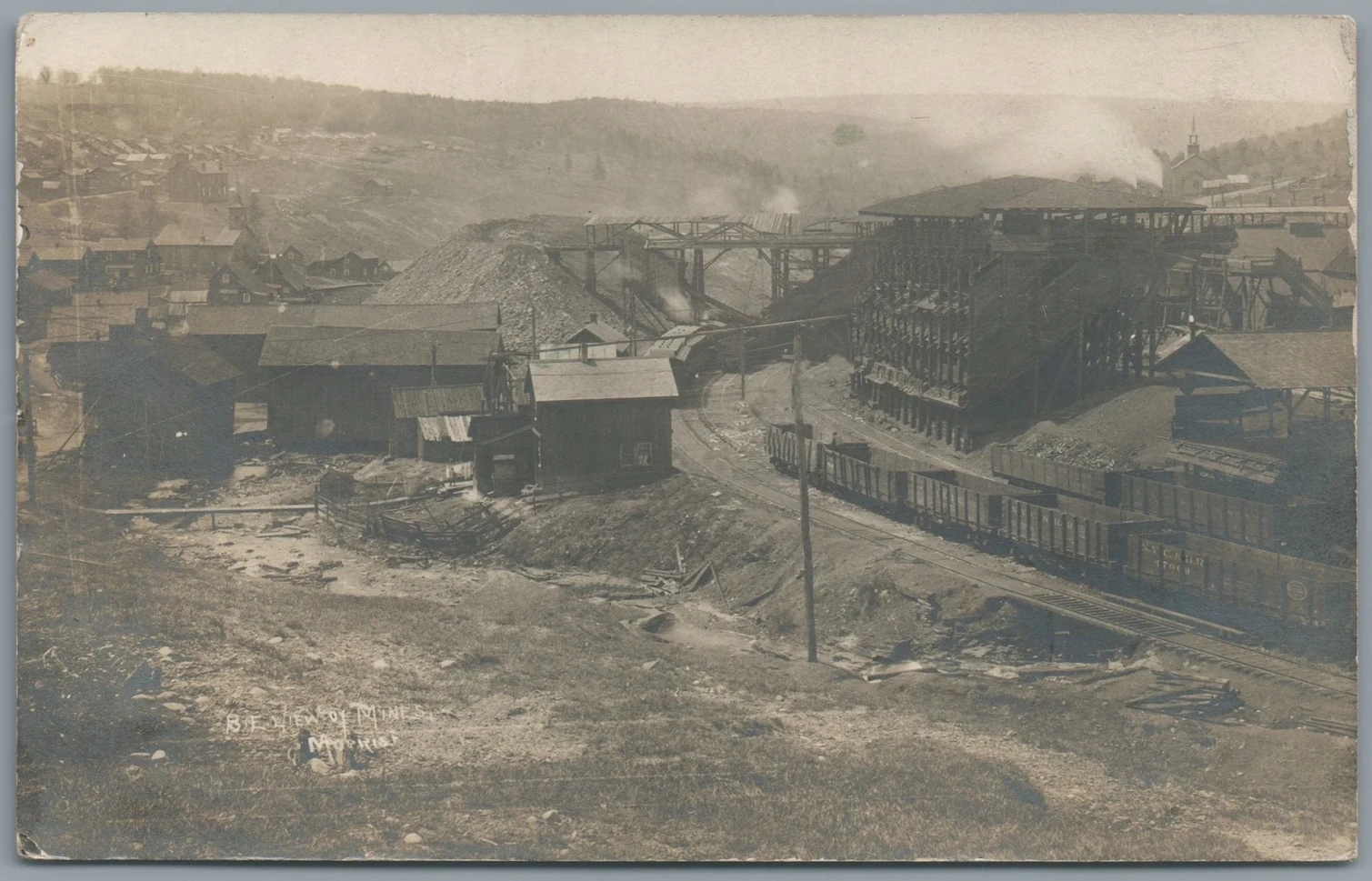
- Tioga Railroad at Morris Run, 1909

- Location within Pennsylvania
- Coordinates: 41°40′38″N 77°01′05″W
- Country: United States
- State: Pennsylvania
- County: Tioga
- Elevation: 1,690 ft (520 m)
- Time zone: UTC-5 (Eastern (EST))
  - Summer (DST): UTC-4 (EDT)
- ZIP Code: 16939
- Area codes: 272 & 570
- GNIS feature ID: 1181572

Morris Run is an unincorporated community in Hamilton Township, Tioga County, Pennsylvania, United States. The community is 2.4 miles (3.9 km) east of Blossburg. Morris Run has a post office with ZIP Code 16939.

The current mayor is Lindsey Wilson.

== Demographics ==
Historical population
Census	Pop.	Note	%±

The United States Census Bureau defined Morris Run as a census designated place (CDP) in 2023.
