= Blossburg, Pennsylvania =

Borough in Pennsylvania, US

- Borough
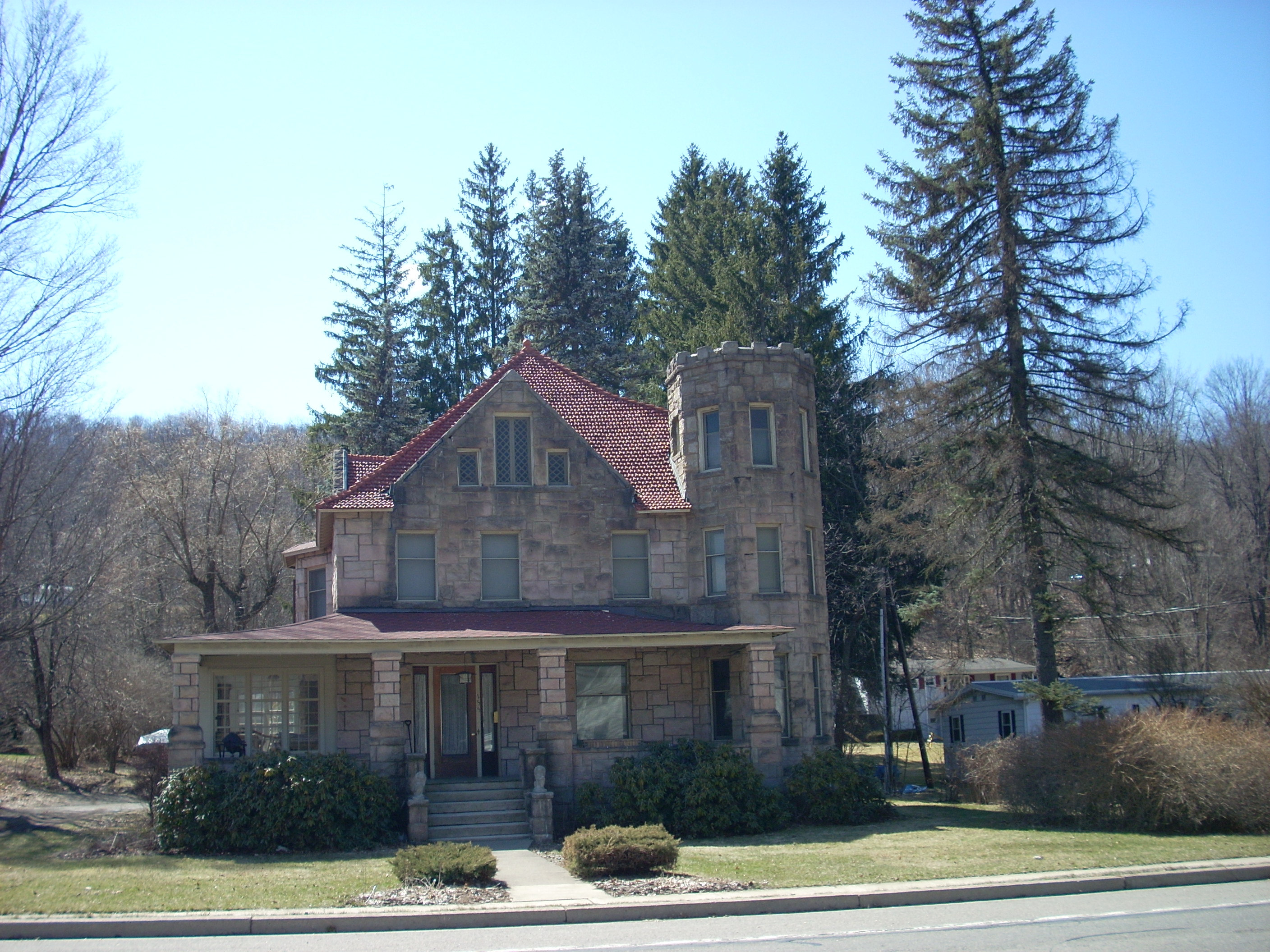
- Blossburg's "castle"

- Location of Blossburg in Tioga County, Pennsylvania.

- Location within the U.S. state of Pennsylvania Blossburg (the United States)
- Coordinates: 41°40′43″N 77°03′48″W
- Country: United States
- State: Pennsylvania
- County: Tioga
- Settled: 1802
- Incorporated (borough): 1871

Area
  - Total: 4.64 sq mi (12.03 km^{2})
  - Land: 4.64 sq mi (12.03 km^{2})
  - Water: 0 sq mi (0.00 km^{2})
- Elevation: 1,342 ft (409 m)

Population (2020)
  - Total: 1,533
  - Density: 329.9/sq mi (127.39/km^{2})
- Time zone: Eastern (EST)
  - Summer (DST): EDT
- ZIP code: 16912
- Area code: 570
- FIPS code: 42-07160
- Website: Blossburg Community Website

Blossburg is a borough in Tioga County, Pennsylvania, United States. The population was 1,533 at the 2020 census.

== History ==
In 1792, a party of immigrants who were building the Williamson Road from Williamsport, in Lycoming County, to Painted Post in New York, under the leadership of Robert and Benjamin Patterson, discovered coal within the present town limits of Blossburg. When the group reached the Tioga River, they established a supply camp at its banks.

In 1801, Aaron Bloss moved to Tioga County. In 1802, he settled at the area known as "Peter’s Camp". He is considered the first settler of Blossburg. Sometime between 1818 and 1820, Bloss made the first attempt to found a town, changing the name of Peter's Camp to Blossburg. Blossburg was finally recognized and incorporated a borough in August 1871.

Shortly after 1810, David Clemens made the first effort to mine and market coal from this area. Clemens opened a mine on Bear Run between 1812 and 1815, serving only the Painted Post area. Around the same time, a lower vein was opened on Bear Run by Aaron Bloss. This vein is known as the Bloss Vein; it also was used to satisfy local demands.

The first efforts to market and ship coal out of this area were on a small scale, due to the poor road conditions and the poor navigability of the Tioga River. In 1817, a coalition of Bloss and the other miners asked the legislature for funds to improve these routes. In the meantime, Blossburg coal was being shipped to Painted Post, Elmira, and Corning in western New York.

More important than the local runs, Blossburg coal was being shipped to the state capital at Albany. The legislature passed bills to support the construction of railroads and improve canal navigation in order to support the transport of coal. Blossburg coal was also shipped to Philadelphia, where it attracted the notice of enterprising businessmen.

In 1826, Judge John H. Knapp erected an iron ore smelting works within the borough limits of Blossburg. Knapp also opened coal mines on Coal Run and ore mines on "Barney Hill".

In July 1840, the railroad was constructed through Covington from Corning, and was opened for locomotives to Blossburg in September. This railroad allowed the mines to be tapped and for their coal to be easily distributed through the Twin Tiers.

For more than 150 years, coal has played a vital role in the development of Blossburg. Today many of the existing mines are dormant. But Ward Manufacturing is a descendant of the Blossburg coal mining industry and is the largest business operating in the Blossburg area.

On June 23, 1967, Mohawk Airlines Flight 40 crashed outside of Blossburg with the loss of all 34 passengers and crew. Flight 40 was a regularly scheduled passenger flight between Elmira, New York and Washington, DC. The aircraft was a BAC 1-11-204AF.

== Geography ==
Blossburg is located at 41°40′39″N 77°3′56″W (41.677615, -77.065519). According to the U.S. Census Bureau, the borough has a total area of 4.8 square miles (12 km^{2}), all land.

== Demographics ==
Historical population
Census	Pop.	Note	%±
1880	2,146		—
1890	2,568		19.7%
1900	2,423		−5.6%
1910	2,303		−5.0%
1920	2,033		−11.7%
1930	1,696		−16.6%
1940	1,955		15.3%
1950	1,954		−0.1%
1960	1,956		0.1%
1970	1,753		−10.4%
1980	1,757		0.2%
1990	1,571		−10.6%
2000	1,480		−5.8%
2010	1,538		3.9%
2020	1,533		−0.3%

As of the census of 2000, there were 1,480 people, 647 households, and 390 families residing in the borough. The population density was 311.8 inhabitants per square mile (120.4/km^{2}). There were 694 housing units at an average density of 146.2 per square mile (56.4/km^{2}). The racial makeup of the borough was 99.05% White, 0.27% African American, 0.14% Native American, 0.07% Asian, 0.14% from other races, and 0.34% from two or more races. Hispanic or Latino of any race were 0.54% of the population.

There were 647 households, out of which 26.7% had children under the age of 18 living with them, 46.5% were married couples living together, 9.7% had a female householder with no husband present, and 39.6% were non-families. 35.4% of all households were made up of individuals, and 21.9% had someone living alone who was 65 years of age or older. The average household size was 2.23 and the average family size was 2.88.

In the borough the population was spread out, with 24.7% under the age of 18, 6.5% from 18 to 24, 23.9% from 25 to 44, 23.2% from 45 to 64, and 21.8% who were 65 years of age or older. The median age was 41 years. For every 100 females there were 92.5 males. For every 100 females age 18 and over, there were 85.5 males.

The median income for a household in the borough was $29,449, and the median income for a family was $41,563. Males had a median income of $27,625 versus $21,133 for females. The per capita income for the borough was $17,375. About 7.0% of families and 12.8% of the population were below the poverty line, including 14.7% of those under age 18 and 9.6% of those age 65 or over.

== Education ==
It is in the Southern Tioga School District.

== Notable people ==
- Franklin Guest Smith, U.S. Army brigadier general
- William Bauchop Wilson, first United States Secretary of Labor.
