= List of legislative routes in Pennsylvania =

From the 1911 passage of the Sproul Road Bill to the 1987 adoption of the Location Referencing System, all state highways in the U.S. state of Pennsylvania were defined as legislative routes, while some were also posted as Traffic Routes. Major routes were assigned three- or four-digit numbers, while minor routes were given five-digit numbers in which the first two digits represented the county, in alphabetical order from 1 (Adams) to 66 (York). (Philadelphia County was initially skipped, but later assigned the number 67.) State-aid projects, which were carried out even before 1911, received their own permanent numbers - State Aid Application X (SAA X or A-X). Many short routes or realignments were defined as spur or parallel routes to another route.

Often a route remained on its old alignment, while the signed Traffic Route was moved to a newer bypass with a different number.

== 1-999 ==
Route	From		To		Post-1987 numbers	Notes
1	Market Street (LR 1/LR 139 - State Route 3012) and Second Street	Harrisburg	Front Street (LR 1/LR 18 - PA Route 61/PA Route 147) and Market Street (LR 161 - PA Route 61)	Sunbury	State Route 3012, State Route 3009, U.S. Route 22, PA Route 147	
2	King Street (LR 2/LR 18 - U.S. Route 11 south/PA Route 147) and Water Street (LR 2 Parallel/LR 18 - U.S. Route 11/PA Route 147)	Northumberland	Northumberland Street (LR 2/LR 3 - U.S. Route 11) and Mill Street (LR 182 - PA Route 54)	Danville	U.S. Route 11	
3	Northumberland Street (LR 2/LR 3 - U.S. Route 11) and Mill Street (LR 182 - PA Route 54)	Danville	Main Street (LR 3/LR 4/U.S. Route 11) and Market Street	Bloomsburg	U.S. Route 11	
4	Main Street (LR 3/LR 4/U.S. Route 11) and Market Street	Bloomsburg	South Street (LR 4/LR 40036 - State Route 2007) and Washington Street (LR 40036 - State Route 2012)	Wilkes-Barre	U.S. Route 11, State Route 2005, State Route 2004, State Route 2007	
5	River Street (LR 5/LR 5 Spur - State Route 2004) and Courtright Avenue (LR 169 - State Route 2009)	Wilkes-Barre	Blakely Street (LR 5/LR 168 - State Route 2020/State Route 6011) and Green Ridge Street (LR 168 - State Route 6011)	Dunmore	State Route 2004, U.S. Route 11, State Route 2035, U.S. Route 11, PA Route 307, State Route 6011	
6	Oak Street (LR 6 - State Route 3033) and Keyser Avenue (LR 671 - State Route 6307)	Scranton	Main Street (LR 6/LR 7 - U.S. Route 6/PA Route 191) and 9th Street	Honesdale	State Route 3033, U.S. Route 6	
7	Main Street (LR 6/LR 7 - U.S. Route 6/PA Route 191) and 9th Street	Honesdale	Hartford Street (LR 7/LR 167 - U.S. Route 6/U.S. Route 209) and Broad Street (LR 8 - U.S. Route 6/U.S. Route 209)	Milford	U.S. Route 6	
8	Broad Street (LR 8 - U.S. Route 6/U.S. Route 209) and Hartford Street (LR 7/LR 167 - U.S. Route 6/U.S. Route 209)	Milford	Mid-Delaware Bridge (LR 8 - U.S. Route 6/U.S. Route 209)	Matamoras	U.S. Route 6	
9	Market Street (LR 9 - State Route 6011) and Main Avenue (LR 168 - State Route 6011)	Scranton	Church Street (LR 9/LR 14 - PA Route 29 North/PA Route 167/PA Route 706), Main Street (LR 12 - PA Route 29 North) and Public Avenue (LR 57024 - State Route 1043)	Montrose	State Route 6011, U.S. Route 11, PA Route 706	
10	U.S. Route 11 (LR 9/LR 10) and PA Route 706 (LR 9)	New Milford Township	New York state line (LR 10 - PA Route 92)	Oakland Township	U.S. Route 11, PA Route 171, PA Route 92	
11	Market Street (LR 11 - State Route 1006) and Washington Street (LR 40036 - State Route 2012)	Wilkes-Barre	Bridge Street (LR 11/LR 12 - PA Route 29 North) and Tioga Street (LR 232/LR 241 - U.S. Route 6)	Tunkhannock	State Route 1009, U.S. Route 11, State Route 1013, PA Route 309, PA Route 29 North	
12	Bridge Street (LR 11/LR 12 - PA Route 29 North) and Tioga Street (LR 232/LR 241 - U.S. Route 6)	Tunkhannock	Main Street (LR 12 - PA Route 29 North), Public Avenue (LR 57024 - State Route 1043) and Church Street (LR 9/LR 14 - PA Route 29 North/PA Route 167/PA Route 706)	Montrose	PA Route 29 North	
13	PA Route 87 (LR 13) and U.S. Route 6 (LR 241)	Washington Township	PA Route 187 (LR 13/LR 15) and U.S. Route 6 (LR 15/LR 241)	Wysox Township	PA Route 87, State Route 4002, PA Route 187	
14	Church Street (LR 9/LR 14 - PA Route 29 North/PA Route 167/PA Route 706), Main Street (LR 12 - PA Route 29 North) and Public Avenue (LR 57024 - State Route 1043)	Montrose	State Route 2010 (LR 14/LR 08010) and PA Route 187 (LR 13)	Terry Township	PA Route 706, U.S. Route 6, State Route 2010	
15	Franklin Street (LR 15 - U.S. Route 6) and Main Street (LR 17 - U.S. Route 6/State Route 2027)	Towanda	New York state line (LR 15 - PA Route 187)	Windham Township	U.S. Route 6, PA Route 187	
16	Lightstreet Road (LR 16 - PA Route 487), Main Street (LR 4 - U.S. Route 11) and East Street (LR 4 - U.S. Route 11)	Bloomsburg	Muncy Street (LR 16/LR 16 Spur E - State Route 3013) and Main Street (LR 17/LR 321 - PA Route 42)	Laporte	PA Route 487, State Route 4049, State Route 2003. U.S. Route 220, State Route 3013	
17	Main Street (LR 17/LR 321 - PA Route 42) and Muncy Street (LR 16/LR 16 Spur E - State Route 3013)	Laporte	Main Street (LR 17/LR 212 - U.S. Route 6) and Bridge Street (LR 08072 - State Route 3018)	Towanda	PA Route 42, U.S. Route 220, State Route 2027, U.S. Route 6	
18	Front Street (LR 1/LR 18 - PA Route 61/PA Route 147) and Market Street (LR 161 - PA Route 61)	Sunbury	Washington Boulevard (LR 18 - State Route 2016) and Market Street (LR 289 - State Route 2023)	Williamsport	PA Route 147, PA Route 405, PA Route 44, State Route 1007, State Route 2014, State Route 2016	
19	Water Street (LR 19/LR 240 - PA Route 405) and Main Street (LR 18 - State Route 2014)	Muncy	Cliff Avenue (LR 17/LR 19 - U.S. Route 220) and Main Street (LR 17 - PA Route 42)	Laporte	PA Route 405, U.S. Route 220, State Route 3015, U.S. Route 220	
20	Hepburn Street (LR 20 - State Route 2016) and Market Street (LR 289/LR 41045 - State Route 2023)	Williamsport	New York state line (LR 20 - PA Route 14)	South Creek Township	State Route 2016, U.S. Route 15, PA Route 14	
21	Susquehanna Trail (LR 20 - U.S. Route 15 / PA Route 14)	Trout Run	Main Street (LR 22 - U.S. Route 6 / PA Route 660 / PA Route 287)	Wellsboro	U.S. Route 15, U.S. Route 6 / PA Route 660	
22	Main Street and East Avenue (LR 22/LR 21 Spur - U.S. Route 6 / PA Route 660 / PA Route 287)	Wellsboro	New York state line		U.S. Route 6 / PA Route 287	
23		Williamsport		Lock Haven		
24	Susquehanna Trail (LR 25 - U.S. Route 11 / U.S. Route 15)	Sunbury	LR 26 and LR 176 - PA Route 45 and U.S. Route 15	Lewisburg	U.S. Route 11 / U.S. Route 15	
25	LR 195 - U.S. Route 522 / PA Route 104	Middleburg	LR 1 - PA Route 147	Sunbury	U.S. Route 522	
26	LR 28 - U.S. Route 522 / PA Route 104	Middleburg	LR 259 - Bridge over Susquehanna, east of LR 24 - U.S. Route 15	Lewisburg	PA Route 104 and PA Route 45	
27		Winfield		Bellefonte		
28		Middleburg		Lewistown		
29		Lewistown		Centre Hall		
30		Harrisburg		Bloomfield		
31		Bloomfield		Mifflintown		
32		Mifflintown		Lewistown		
33		Lewistown		Huntingdon		
34		Harrisburg		Carlisle		
35		Carlisle		Chambersburg		
36		Chambersburg	Maryland state line			
37		Chambersburg		McConnellsburg		
38		McConnellsburg	Maryland state line			
39		McConnellsburg		Bedford		
40		Carlisle		Bloomfield		
41		Carlisle		Gettysburg		
42		Gettysburg	Maryland state line			
43		Gettysburg		Chambersburg		
44		Gettysburg	Maryland state line			
45		Fort Loudon		Mifflintown		
46		Everett		Huntingdon		
47		Bedford		Hollidaysburg		
48		Bedford	Maryland state line			
49		Bedford		Somerset		
50		Somerset		Uniontown		
51		Berlin	Maryland state line			
52		Somerset		Ebensburg		
53		Ebensburg		Hollidaysburg		
54		Ebensburg		Indiana		
55		Hollidaysburg		Huntingdon		
56		Tyrone		Pleasant Gap		
57		Tyrone		Clearfield		
58		Bellefonte		Lock Haven		
59		Clearfield		Ridgway		
60		DuBois		Brookville		
61		Brockway		Brookville		
62		Curwensville		Ebensburg		
63		Brookville		Indiana		
64		Brookville		Clarion		
65		Clarion		Franklin		
66		Clarion		Kittanning		
67		Kittanning		Indiana		
68		Indiana		Greensburg		
69		Kittanning		Greensburg		
70	5th Street (LR 69/LR 70 - PA Route 128 and High Street (LR 69 - PA Route 128)	Freeport	Western Avenue (LR 70/LR 246 - State Route 4071/State Route 4084) and Allegheny Avenue (LR 246 and LR 652 - State Route 4001)	Pittsburgh	PA Route 128, PA Route 356, State Route 2019, State Route 1001, PA Route 28, State Route 4084	
71		Kittanning		Butler		
72	Main Street (LR 72/LR 73 - PA Route 8/PA Route 356) and Jefferson Street (LR 71 Parallel/LR 73 Parallel - PA Route 68/PA Route 356)	Butler	Butler Street (LR 70/LR 72 - State Route 1001/State Route 4019) and Freeport Street (LR 70 - State Route 1001)	Etna	PA Route 8, State Route 1003, State Route 4019	
73		Butler		Mercer		
74		Mercer	Ohio state line			
75		Butler		Van		
76	Carson Street (LR 76/LR 257 - PA Route 51/PA Route 837) and Main Street (LR 257 - U.S. Route 19 north/PA Route 51 north/PA Route 60 south)	Pittsburgh	3rd Street (LR 76/LR 243 - PA Route 68) between Market Street (LR A-892 - State Route 4018) and Commerce Street	Beaver	PA Route 51, State Route 3109, State Route 3077, State Route 3007, State Route 3002, PA Route 18, State Route 6018, State Route 4042, PA Route 68	
77		Beaver		New Castle		
78		Beaver		Butler		
79		Butler		New Castle		
80		New Castle		Mercer		
81		New Castle	Ohio state line			
82		Mercer		Meadville		
83		Conneaut Lake	Ohio state line			
84		Meadville		Erie		
85		Meadville		West Springfield		
86	Ohio state line			Erie		
87		Erie	New York state line			
88		Erie		Warren		
89		Pittsfield		Meadville		
90		Black Ash		Franklin		
91		Franklin		Tionesta		
92		Tionesta		Shippenville		
93		Tionesta		Youngsville		
94		Warren	New York state line			
95		Warren		Smethport		
96		Smethport	New York state line			
97		Bradford		Ridgway		
98		Ridgway		Tionesta		
99		Ridgway		Emporium		
100		Emporium		Farmers Valley		
101		Smethport		Coudersport		
102		Coudersport		Wellsboro		
103		Coudersport		New York state line		
104		Coudersport		Forest House		
105		Emporium		Lock Haven		
106		Lock Haven		Wellsboro		
107						
108	Noblestown Road (LR 108/LR 257 - PA Route 50/PA Route 60) and Crafton Boulevard (LR 257 - PA Route 60)	Pittsburgh	College Street (LR 108 - U.S. Route 19) and Maiden Street (LR 113 - U.S. Route 19/U.S. Route 40)	Washington	PA Route 50, State Route 3003, State Route 1009, PA Route 980, PA Route 519, U.S. Route 19	
109		Washington		Waynesburg		
110		Waynesburg	West Virginia state line			
111		Waynesburg	West Virginia state line			
112		Waynesburg		Uniontown		
113		Uniontown		Washington		
114		Washington	West Virginia state line			
115		Washington		Beaver		
116		Uniontown	West Virginia state line			
117		Uniontown		Greensburg		
118		Greensburg		Washington		
119		Greensburg		Bedford		
120		Greensburg		Pittsburgh		
136	Maryland state line		King Street (LR 142 - PA 462) and Prince Street (LR 136/138 - U.S. Route 222 / PA 272)	Lancaster	U.S. Route 222 / PA 72	
138	King Street (LR 142 - PA 462) and Prince Street (LR 136/138 - U.S. Route 222 / PA 272)	Lancaster	Cornwall Road (LR 137 - PA 72 / U.S. Route 322)	Cornwall	U.S. Route 222 / PA 72 / PA 272, U.S. Route 322 / PA 72	
139	Front Street and Market Street	Harrisburg	9th Street (PA 72) and Cumberland Street/Benjamin Franklin Highway (US 422)	Lebanon		
139 Spur	State Street	Harrisburg	South 40th Street at Paxton Street	Harrisburg		
140		Harrisburg		Lebanon	US 22	
140A		Paxtonia		Linglestown	PA 39	
442	Prince Street (LR 136/138 - US 222 / PA 272)	Lancaster	Lakes to Sea Highway (LR 137 - US 322) and Furnace Hills Pike (A-7069 - PA 501)	Brickerville	US 222, PA 501	

== 1000-9999 ==
Route	From		To		Post-1987 numbers	Notes
1000		Philadelphia	Interstate 295 (LR 1000/LR 1020) and Taylorsville Road (LR 09025 - State Route 2071)	Lower Makefield Township	Interstate 295	
1001	Interstate 81 (LR 790/LR 1001)	South Abington Township	New York state line (LR 1001 - Interstate 81)	Great Bend Township	Interstate 81	
1002	Interstate 84/Interstate 380 (LR 168/LR 1002) and PA Route 435 (LR 168)	Dunmore	Interstate 80 (LR 794/LR 1002) and PA Route 611 (LR 168)	Stroud Township	Interstate 84, Interstate 380, Interstate 80	
1003	Interstate 79 (LR 1003/LR 1017) and Interstate 90 (LR 797)	McKean Township	Interstate 79 (LR 1003) and 12th Street (LR 25029 - PA Route 5)	Erie	Interstate 79	
1004						
1005	Interstate 81 (LR 799/LR 1005) and U.S. Route 11 (LR 34)	Middlesex Township	Interstate 81 (LR 790/LR 1005) and Interstate 84/Interstate 380 (LR 790)	Dunmore	Interstate 81	
1006						
1007	PA Route 378 (LR 297/LR 1007) and Bridge Street (LR 297 - offramp)	Bethlehem	PA Route 378 (LR 1007) and U.S. Route 22 (LR 772)	Bethlehem	PA Route 378	
1008						
1009						
1010						
1011						
1012						
1013						
1014						
1015						
1016						
1017						
1018						
1019						
1020	Interstate 295 (LR 1000/LR 1020) and Taylorsville Road (LR 09025 - State Route 2071)	Lower Makefield Township	Scudder Falls Bridge (LR 1020 - Interstate 295)	Lower Makefield Township	Interstate 295	
1141	Newtown Bypass (LR 1141/LR 09047 - PA Route 413) and Swamp Road (LR 09047 - State Route 2036)	Newtown Township	Newtown Bypass (LR 1141 - PA Route 332) and Newtown Yardley Road (LR 252 - PA Route 332)	Newtown Township	PA Route 413, PA Route 332	
