= Sugar Run =

Sugar Run may refer to:

- Sugar Run (Todd Fork tributary), a stream in Ohio
- Sugar Run (Bowman Creek tributary), a stream in Pennsylvania
- Sugar Run Creek, a tributary to the Susquehanna River in Bradford County, Pennsylvania
- Sugar Run (Marsh Creek tributary), a stream in Pennsylvania
- Sugar Run (Youghiogheny River tributary), a stream in Fayette County, Pennsylvania
- Sugar Run, Pennsylvania, an unincorporated community
