= Sugar Run Creek =

Creek in Pennsylvania, US

Coordinates: 41.63295°N 76.23423°W

Sugar Run Creek is a tributary of the Susquehanna River in Bradford County, Pennsylvania, in the United States. It is approximately 7.9 miles (12.7 km) and flows through North Branch Township, Windham Township, and Wilmot Township.

== Course ==
Sugar Run Creek begins near a pond in North Branch Township. It flows north and immediately enters Windham Township. In this township, the creek continues north for a short distance before turning west. A short distance downstream, the creek enters Wilmot Township. It then turns northwest and flows past Grant Hill. Continuing northwest, the creek flows parallel to Pennsylvania Route 187 and receives the tributaries Rock Cabin Run and Panther Lick Creek. It then turns north and slightly east and picks up the tributary Sugar Run. The valley of the creek broadens and a couple of miles later, the creek reaches its confluence with the Susquehanna River.

== Hydrology ==
The discharge of Sugar Run Creek ranges from 2.4–31 cubic feet per second (0.068–0.878 m^{3}/s). The turbidity of the creek's waters is 21 JTU. The specific conductance of the creek's waters ranges between 100 micro-siemens per centimeter at 25 °C (77 °F) and 163 micro-siemens per centimeter at 25 °C (77 °F).

The concentration of dissolved oxygen in the waters of Sugar Run Creek is 10.0 milligrams per liter and the concentration of carbon dioxide ranges from 1.2–1.8 millimetres per litre (0.0013–0.0020 in/imp fl oz). The pH of the creek's waters ranges between 7.0 and 7.7. The concentration of bicarbonate in the creek ranges between 7.0 and 53 7–53 millimetres per litre (0.0078–0.0593 in/imp fl oz), and the concentration of carbonate is 0.0 milligrams per liter.

== Geography ==
The elevation near the mouth of Sugar Run Creek is 636 feet (194 m) above sea level.

== Biology ==
Trout reproduce naturally in Sugar Run Creek.

== See also ==
- List of rivers of Pennsylvania
