= Wysox, Pennsylvania =

Unincorporated community in Pennsylvania, US

- Unincorporated community
- Location within Pennsylvania
- Coordinates: 41°46′28″N 76°23′58″W
- Country: United States
- State: Pennsylvania
- County: Bradford
- Elevation: 718 ft (219 m)
- Time zone: UTC-5 (Eastern (EST))
  - Summer (DST): UTC-4 (EDT)
- ZIP code: 18854
- Area codes: 272 & 570
- GNIS feature ID: 1205002

Wysox is an unincorporated community in Bradford County, Pennsylvania, United States. The community is located at the intersection of U.S. Route 6 and Pennsylvania Route 187, 2.3 miles (3.7 km) east of Towanda. Wysox has a post office with ZIP code 18854.

== Demographics ==
Wysox had a population of 1,721 and 800 housing units as of the 2010 census. The population is 51% male, 49% female, 96.7% white, 0.3% Black or African American, 0.5% American Indian or Alaska Native, 0.6% Asian, 1.2% two or more races, 0.7% some other race, and 1.4% Hispanic or Latino of any race.

== History ==
Wysox was founded in 1795. Its name comes from a Native American word meaning "canoe harbor." The Lehigh Valley Railroad used to run through Wysox.

== Geography ==
Wysox has an area of 23.32 square miles, of which 0.6 square miles are water. Its elevation is 718 feet. Wysox Creek flows through Wysox, then heads south near U.S. Route 6 before merging into the Susquehanna River.

== Government ==
Wysox's Board of Supervisors currently consists of Chairman William Them, Evan R. Barnes, and Thomas C. Thompson III. Its most recent elections for supervisor were held on November 6, 2019.

== Education ==
Wysox is in the Towanda Area School District.

== Notable people ==
- Marguerite St. Leon Loud (1812-1889), poet and writer
