= Rome, Pennsylvania =

Borough in Pennsylvania, US

- Borough
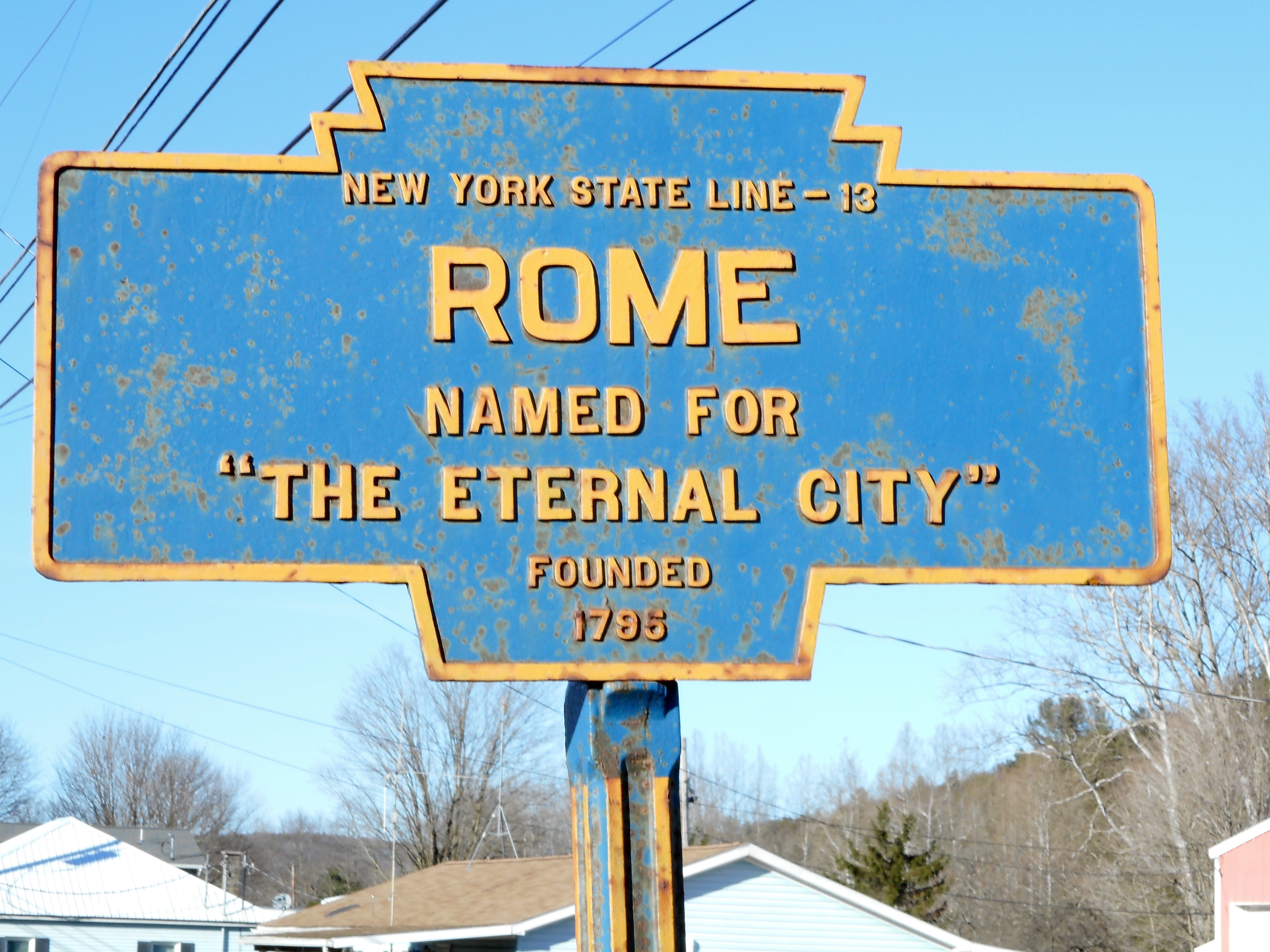
- Keystone Marker

- Location of Rome in Bradford County, Pennsylvania.

- Location of Rome in the state of Pennsylvania Rome (the United States)
- Coordinates: 41°51′25″N 76°20′30″W
- Country: United States
- State: Pennsylvania
- County: Bradford
- Settled: 1796
- Incorporated: 1860

Government
  - Mayor: John Babcock

Area
  - Total: 0.53 sq mi (1.37 km^{2})
  - Land: 0.52 sq mi (1.34 km^{2})
  - Water: 0.0077 sq mi (0.02 km^{2})
- Elevation: 837 ft (255 m)

Population (2020)
  - Total: 384
  - Density: 740.3/sq mi (285.82/km^{2})
- Time zone: UTC-5 (Eastern (EST))
  - Summer (DST): UTC-4 (EDT)
- ZIP Code: 18837
- Area code: 570
- FIPS code: 42-65944
- Website: romeborough.org

Rome is a borough in Bradford County, Pennsylvania, United States. It is part of Northeastern Pennsylvania. The population was 385 at the 2020 census.

== History ==
The Phillip Paul Bliss House was added to the National Register of Historic Places in 1986.

== Geography ==
Rome is located in northeastern Bradford County at 41°51′25″N 76°20′30″W (41.856855, -76.341558), in the valley of Wysox Creek, a tributary of the Susquehanna River. It is surrounded by Rome Township but is separate from it.

Pennsylvania Route 187 passes through the borough, leading southwest 9 miles (14 km) to Towanda, the county seat, and north 12 miles (19 km) to the New York state line. According to the U.S. Census Bureau, the borough has a total area of 0.54 square miles (1.4 km^{2}), of which 0.0077 square miles (0.02 km^{2}), or 1.42%, is water.

== Demographics ==
Historical population
Census	Pop.	Note	%±
1870	230		—
1880	236		2.6%
1890	226		−4.2%
1900	233		3.1%
1910	222		−4.7%
1920	200		−9.9%
1930	210		5.0%
1940	218		3.8%
1950	257		17.9%
1960	274		6.6%
1970	338		23.4%
1980	426		26.0%
1990	475		11.5%
2000	382		−19.6%
2010	441		15.4%
2020	384		−12.9%
2021 (est.)	383	▼	−0.3%
U.S. Decennial Census

As of the census of 2000, there were 382 people, 157 households, and 103 families residing in the borough. The population density was 617.3 inhabitants per square mile (238.3/km^{2}). There were 176 housing units at an average density of 284.4 per square mile (109.8/km^{2}). The racial makeup of the borough was 98.95% White, 0.52% Native American, 0.26% Asian, and 0.26% from two or more races.

There were 157 households, out of which 31.8% had children under the age of 18 living with them, 50.3% were married couples living together, 11.5% had a female householder with no husband present, and 33.8% were non-families. 28.7% of all households were made up of individuals, and 11.5% had someone living alone who was 65 years of age or older. The average household size was 2.43 and the average family size was 2.99.

In the borough the population was spread out, with 28.0% under the age of 18, 8.6% from 18 to 24, 29.6% from 25 to 44, 20.4% from 45 to 64, and 13.4% who were 65 years of age or older. The median age was 33 years. For every 100 females there were 86.3 males. For every 100 females age 18 and over, there were 82.1 males.

The median income for a household in the borough was $26,417, and the median income for a family was $29,875. Males had a median income of $27,222 versus $16,458 for females. The per capita income for the borough was $15,127. About 15.2% of families and 20.6% of the population were below the poverty line, including 28.6% of those under age 18 and none of those age 65 or over.

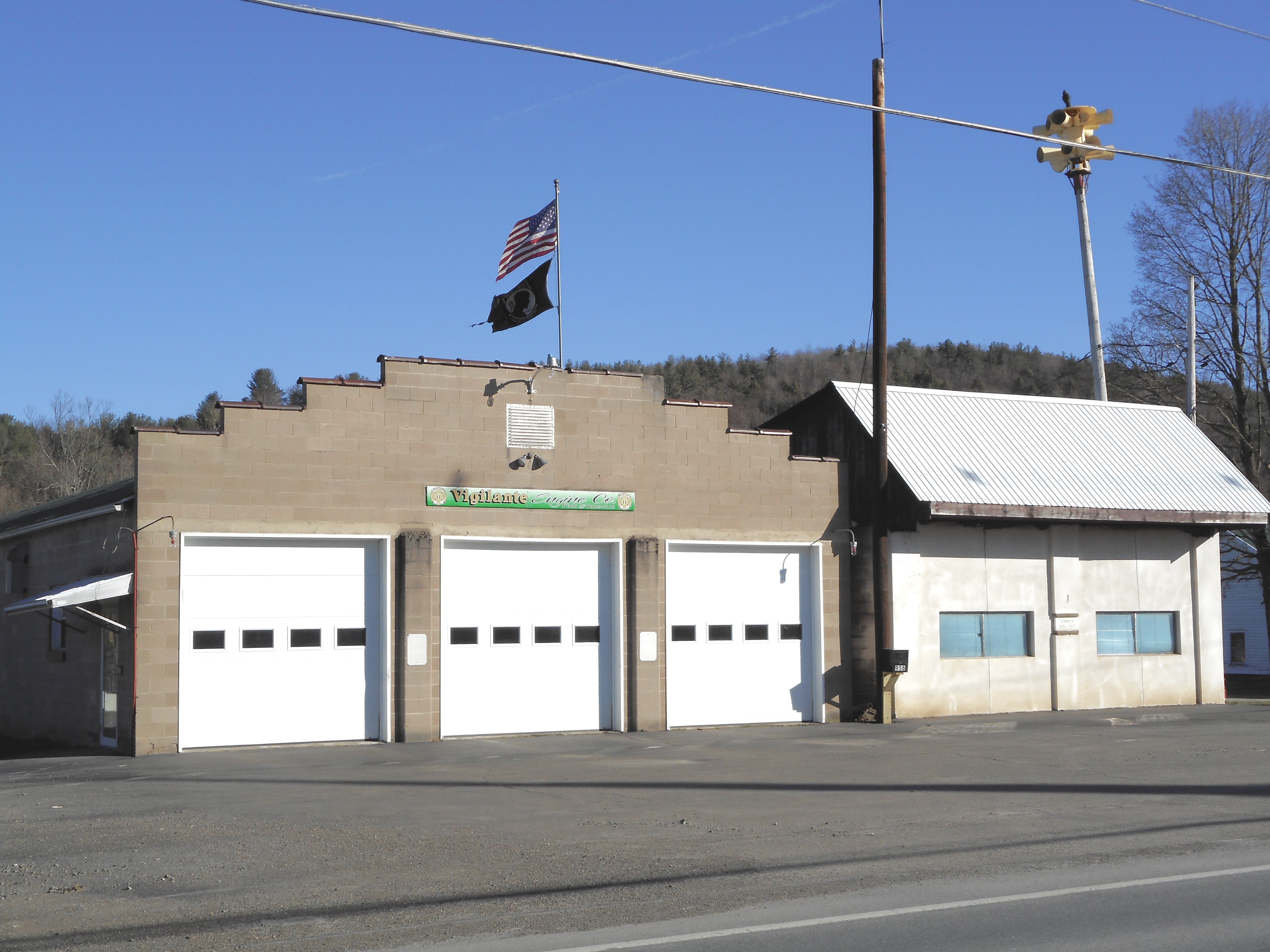
Vigilante Engine Company

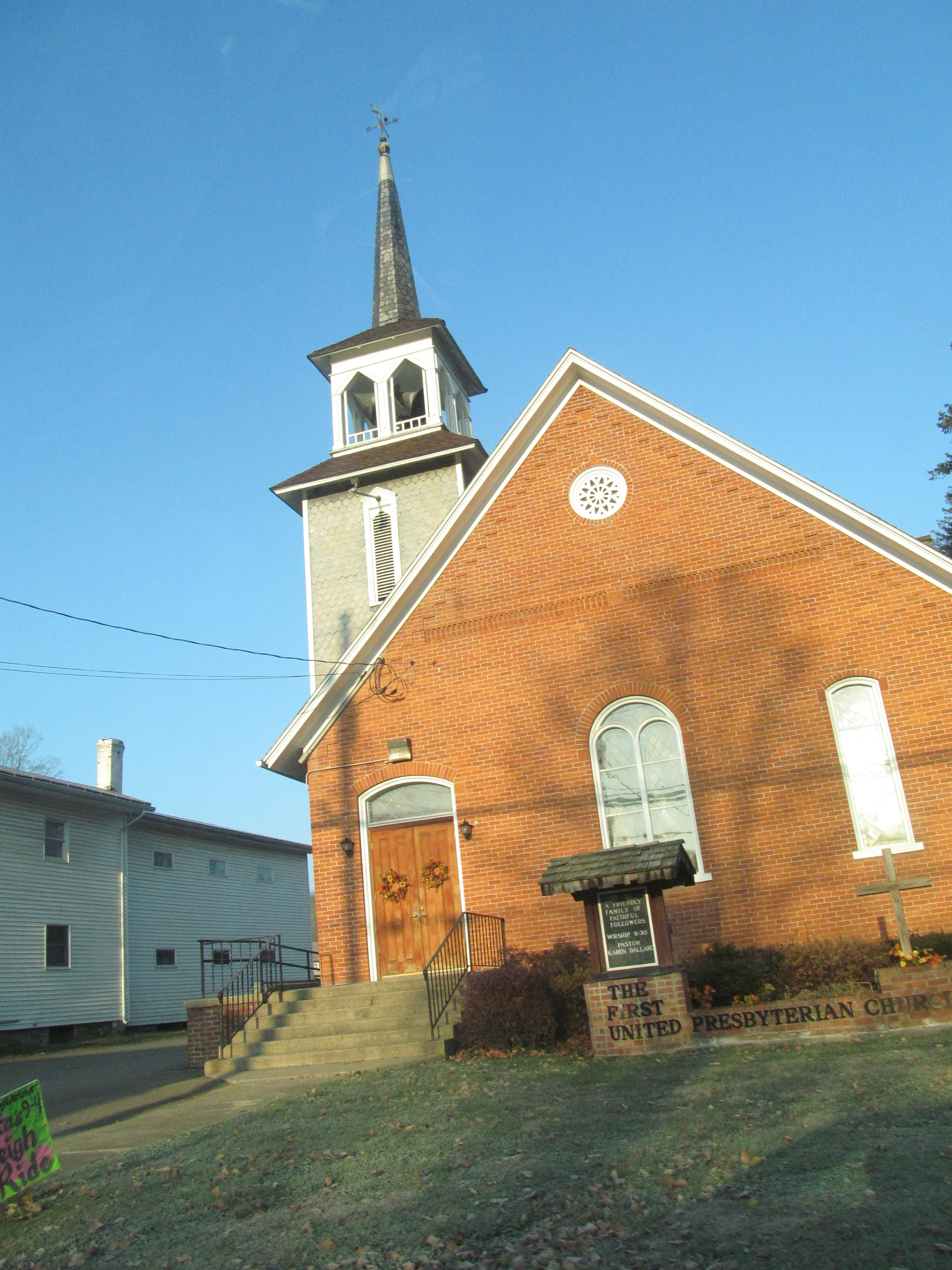
Presbyterian church

== Notable person ==
- Philip Bliss, writer of "Hallelujah, What a Saviour!" and other hymns
