= Marguerite St. Leon Loud =

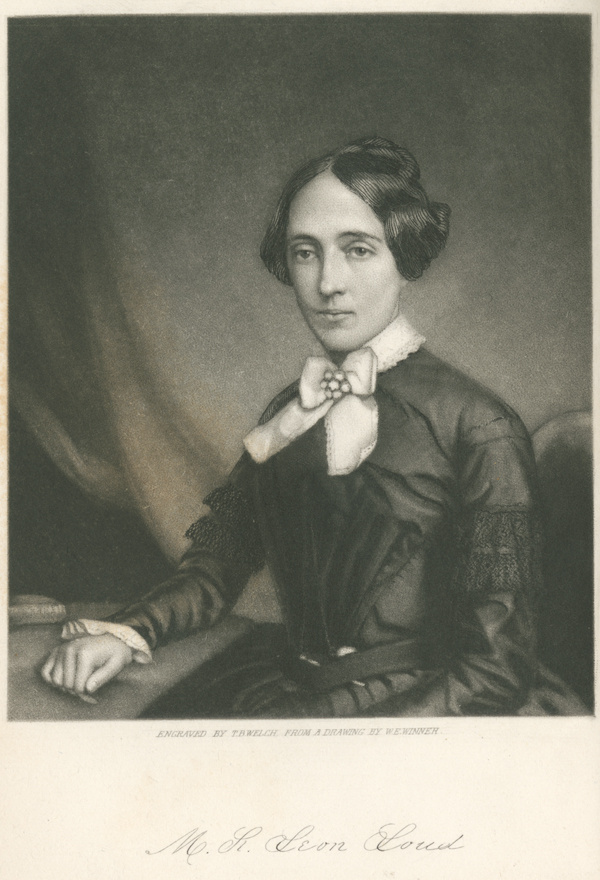
- M. St. Leon Loud, engraved by T. B. Welch from a drawing by W. E. Winner.
- Born: Marguerite St. Leon Barstow; April 17, 1812; Wysox, Pennsylvania, U.S.
- Died: November 4, 1889 (aged 77); Kenyon, Minnesota
- Occupations: poet; writer
- Spouse: John Loud (m. 1834)
- Writing career
- Notable work: "The Hermit of Wysauking"

Marguerite St. Leon Loud (née Barstow; April 17, 1812 – November 4, 1889) was a 19th-century American poet and writer. One of her best stories was "The Hermit of Wysauking". Wayside Flowers, a collection of her poems, was published in 1851.

== Early life and education ==
Marguerite St. Leon Barstow was born in Wysox, Pennsylvania, on April 17, 1812. (Note: Frank et al. (1997) record Marguerite's year of birth as 1800.) She was the second daughter of Dr. Seth T. Barstow, a physician with a successful and extended practice, and Clarissa (Woodruff) Barstow. They were both from New England, but settled in Bradford County, Pennsylvania where Loud passed the early part of her life at her home among the windings of the Susquehanna River.

She received almost of her education at home. With an ample library for her instruction, her mother was her teacher. She committed whole volumes of poetry to memory, and studied the best poets.

== Career ==
She wrote stanzas in albums, but did not commit any of her numerous effusions to publication till after her marriage, in 1834, (Note: In the Preface to Wayside Flowers (1851), Park Benjamin clarifies that the year of marriage was 1834, not 1824, as recorded by other authors.) when she married John Loud, a Philadelphia piano maker, (Note: According to Heverly (1913), John Loud was from Georgia.) of the Loud Brothers company, the leading American piano manufacturer during the 1820s–30s.

It was not until the time of her marriage, that her own talent as a poet began to develop itself. Early thereafter, Loud attained celebrity as a poet and writer, contributing to various magazines and daily journals. Her poems appeared in the United States Gazette, and other papers and magazines. She was a regular contributor to the Saturday Courier of Philadelphia. One of her best stories was "The Hermit of Wysauking". A collection of her poems, Wayside Flowers, was published in 1851.

== Style and themes ==
Her poems were characterized as possessing much melody of language, graceful thought, and tender feeling. Edgar Allan Poe, in his Autography, praised Loud, that she "has imagination of no common order, and, unlike many of her sex, is not content to dwell in decencies forever. While she can, upon occasion, compose the ordinary singsong with all the decorous proprieties which are in fashion, she yet ventures very frequently into a more ethereal region.”

== Personal life ==
Except during a short period passed in the South, she resided thereafter in Philadelphia. (Note: In the Preface to Wayside Flowers (1851), Park Benjamin clarifies that Loud resided, during many of the maturer years of her life, in the South, but her residence in 1851 was in Philadelphia.)

Marguerite St. Leon Loud died in Kenyon, Minnesota, on November 4, 1889.

== Selected works ==
- Wayside Flowers (Boston, Massachusetts: Ticknor, Reed & Fields, 1851) (Text)
