= Rome Township, Bradford County, Pennsylvania =

Township in Pennsylvania, US

Coordinates: 41°52′06″N 76°22′21″W

- Township
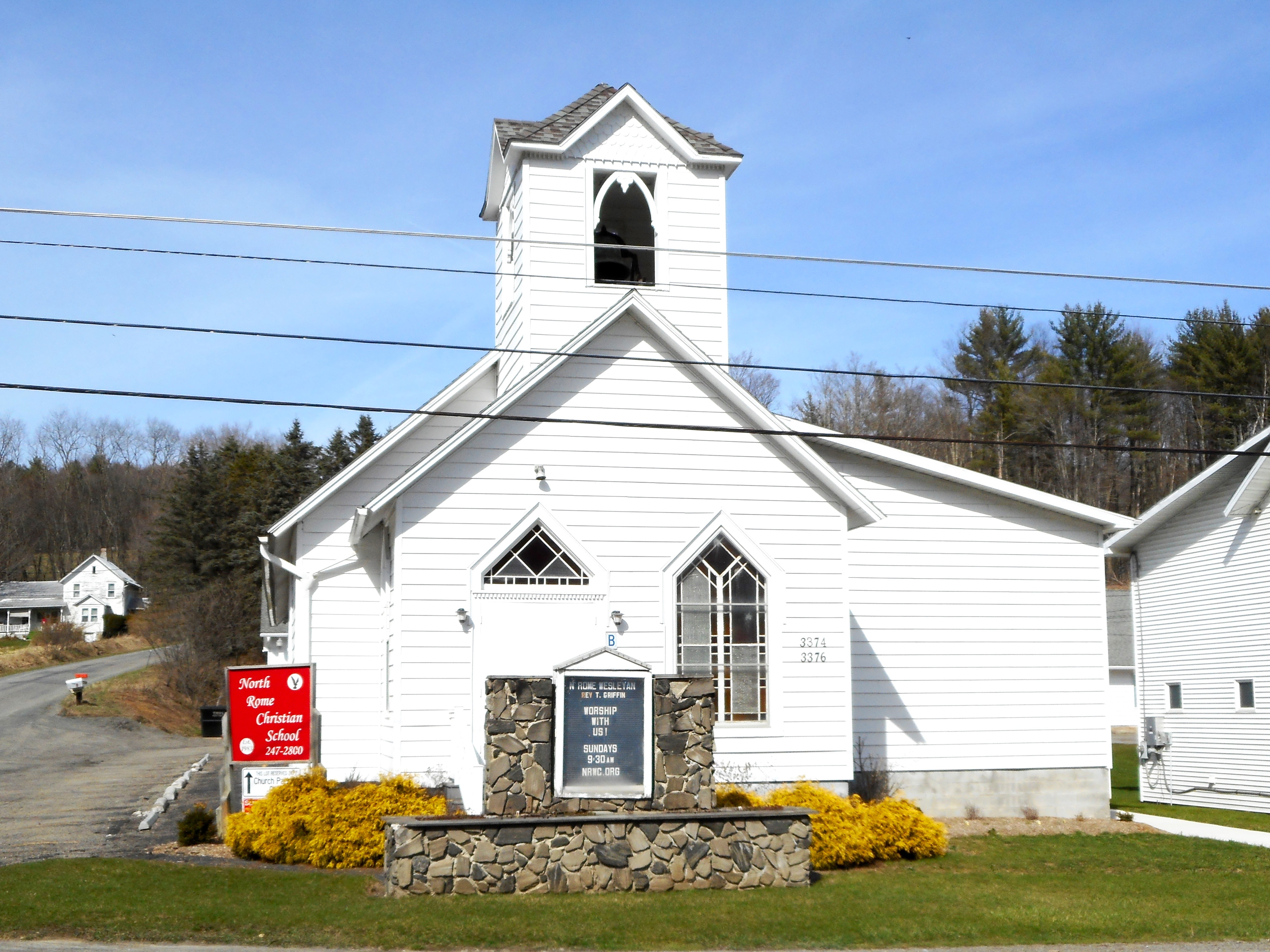
- North Rome Wesleyan Church

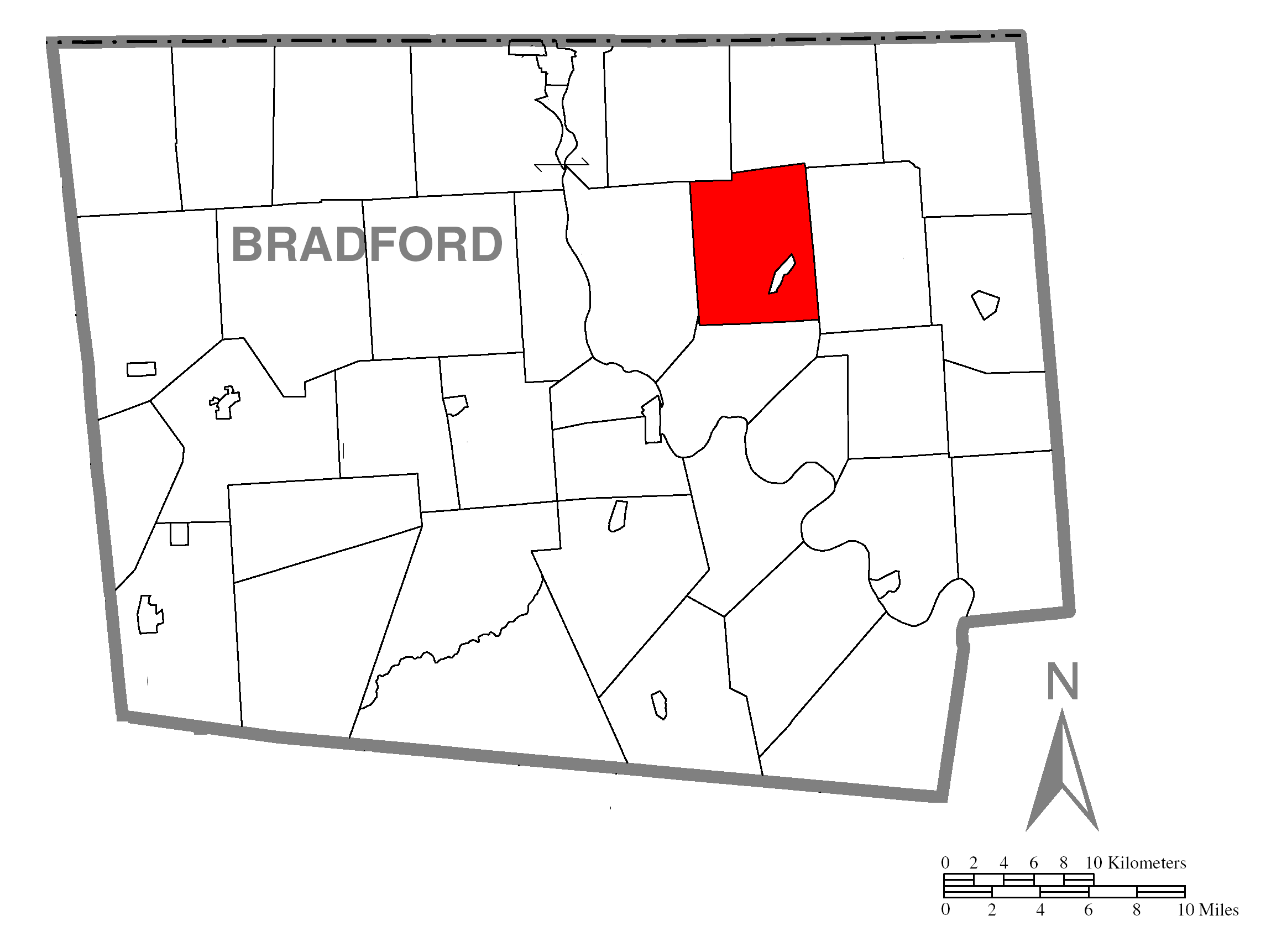
- Map of Bradford County with Rome Township highlighted

- Map of Bradford County, Pennsylvania
- Country: United States
- State: Pennsylvania
- County: Bradford
- Settled: 1796
- Incorporated: 1831

Area
  - Total: 30.09 sq mi (77.92 km^{2})
  - Land: 29.91 sq mi (77.47 km^{2})
  - Water: 0.17 sq mi (0.45 km^{2})

Population (2020)
  - Total: 1,004 ▼
  - Estimate (2023): 997
  - Density: 41/sq mi (15.7/km^{2})
- FIPS code: 42-015-65952
- Website: www.rometownshippa.org

Rome Township is a township in Bradford County, Pennsylvania, United States. It is part of Northeastern Pennsylvania. The population was 1,004 at the 2020 census.

== Geography ==
Rome Township is located in northeastern Bradford County and is bordered by Litchfield and Windham townships to the north, Orwell Township to the east, Wysox Township to the south, and Sheshequin Township to the west. The borough of Rome is surrounded by Rome Township but separate from it. Pennsylvania Route 187 follows the valley of Wysox Creek through the southeast portion of the township and Rome borough. The unincorporated community of North Rome is located near the western border of the township.

According to the U.S. Census bureau, Rome Township has a total area of 30.1 square miles (77.9 km^{2}), of which 29.9 square miles (77.5 km^{2}) is land and 0.15 square miles (0.4 km^{2}), or 0.57%, is water.

== Demographics ==
Historical population
Census	Pop.	Note	%±
2010	1,191		—
2020	1,004		−15.7%
2023 (est.)	997		−0.7%
U.S. Decennial Census

As of the census of 2000, there were 1,221 people, 450 households, and 342 families residing in the township. The population density was 40.8 inhabitants per square mile (15.8/km^{2}). There were 529 housing units at an average density of 17.7/sq mi (6.8/km^{2}). The racial makeup of the township was 97.95% White, 0.25% African American, 0.74% Native American, and 1.06% from two or more races. Hispanic or Latino of any race were 0.41% of the population.

There were 450 households, out of which 37.6% had children under the age of 18 living with them, 66.0% were married couples living together, 6.9% had a female householder with no husband present, and 24.0% were non-families. 18.0% of all households were made up of individuals, and 8.0% had someone living alone who was 65 years of age or older. The average household size was 2.71 and the average family size was 3.05.

In the township the population was spread out, with 28.4% under the age of 18, 7.0% from 18 to 24, 28.6% from 25 to 44, 24.8% from 45 to 64, and 11.2% who were 65 years of age or older. The median age was 36 years. For every 100 females, there were 102.2 males. For every 100 females age 18 and over, there were 98.2 males.

The median income for a household in the township was $35,272, and the median income for a family was $38,026. Males had a median income of $28,618 versus $21,078 for females. The per capita income for the township was $15,425. About 4.0% of families and 8.7% of the population were below the poverty line, including 9.8% of those under age 18 and 5.1% of those age 65 or over.
