= Wilmot Township, Pennsylvania =

Township in Pennsylvania, US

Coordinates: 41°35′36″N 76°16′18″W

- Township
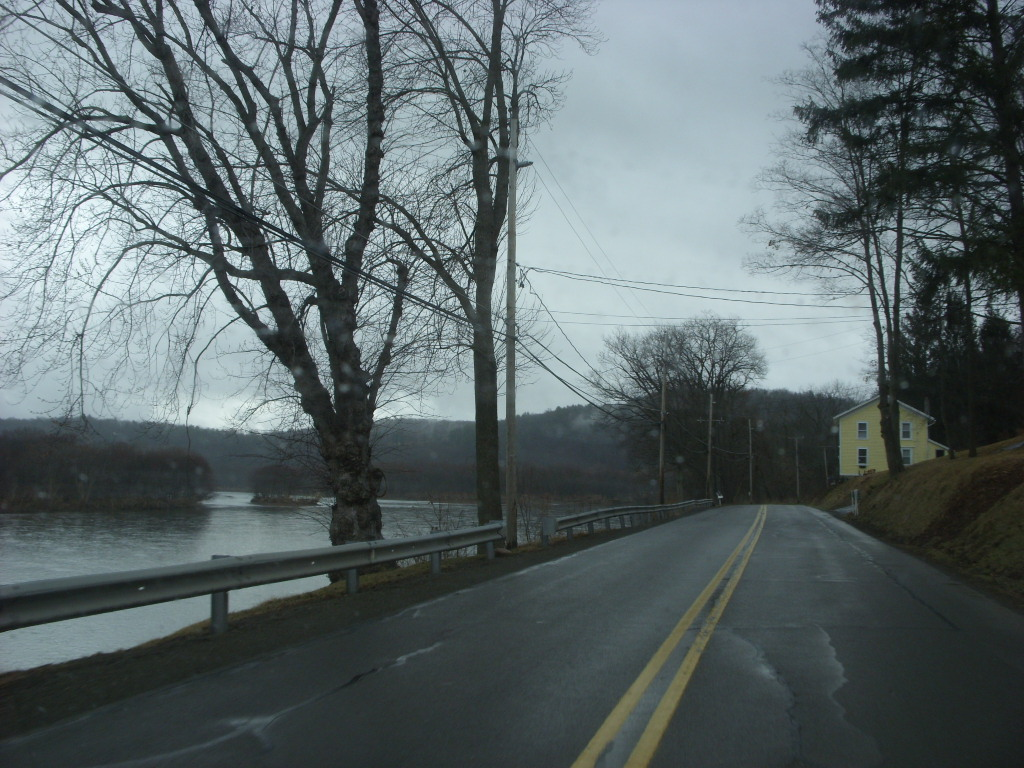
- PA 187 southbound in the village of Sugar Run

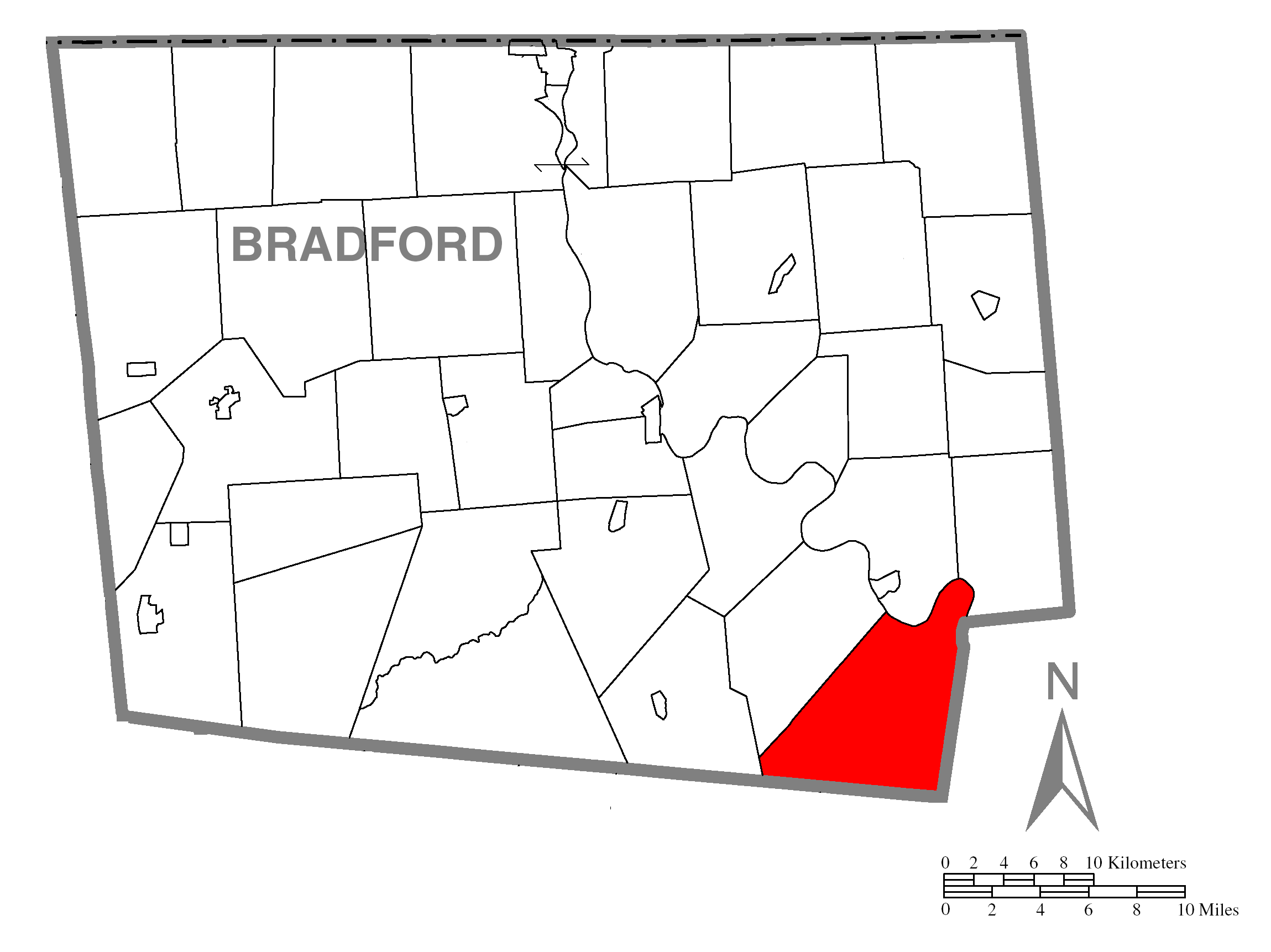
- Map of Bradford County with Wilmot Township highlighted

- Map of Bradford County, Pennsylvania
- Country: United States
- State: Pennsylvania
- County: Bradford
- Settled: 1784
- Incorporated: 1849

Area
  - Total: 44.74 sq mi (115.87 km^{2})
  - Land: 43.76 sq mi (113.35 km^{2})
  - Water: 0.97 sq mi (2.52 km^{2})

Population (2010)
  - Total: 1,204
  - Estimate (2016): 1,162
  - Density: 26.5/sq mi (10.25/km^{2})
- Area code: 570
- FIPS code: 42-015-85544

Wilmot Township is a township in Bradford County, Pennsylvania. It is part of Northeastern Pennsylvania. The population was 1,204 at the 2010 census.

== Geography ==
Wilmot Township is located in southeastern Bradford County and is bordered by Albany Township to the west, Terry Township to the northwest, and by Wyalusing Township and Tuscarora Township to the north across the Susquehanna River. To the east, in Wyoming County, are Braintrim, Windham, and North Branch townships, and to the south, in Sullivan County, are Colley and Cherry townships. The unincorporated community of Sugar Run is located in the northern part of the township, along the Susquehanna River.

According to the United States Census Bureau, the township has a total area of 44.7 square miles (115.9 km^{2}), of which 43.8 square miles (113.4 km^{2}) is land and 0.97 square miles (2.5 km^{2}), or 2.17%, is water.

== Demographics ==
Historical population
Census	Pop.	Note	%±
2010	1,204		—
2016 (est.)	1,162		−3.5%
U.S. Decennial Census

As of the census of 2000, there were 1,177 people, 454 households, and 339 families residing in the township. The population density was 26.8 inhabitants per square mile (10.3/km^{2}). There were 723 housing units at an average density of 16.5/sq mi (6.4/km^{2}). The racial makeup of the township was 98.22% White, 0.34% African American, 0.08% Native American, 0.25% Asian, 0.08% Pacific Islander, 0.25% from other races, and 0.76% from two or more races. Hispanic or Latino of any race were 0.51% of the population.

There were 454 households, out of which 30.4% had children under the age of 18 living with them, 63.7% were married couples living together, 6.8% had a female householder with no husband present, and 25.3% were non-families. 19.4% of all households were made up of individuals, and 9.5% had someone living alone who was 65 years of age or older. The average household size was 2.59 and the average family size was 2.93.

In the township the population was spread out, with 25.1% under the age of 18, 6.3% from 18 to 24, 26.8% from 25 to 44, 28.2% from 45 to 64, and 13.7% who were 65 years of age or older. The median age was 39 years. For every 100 females there were 105.4 males. For every 100 females age 18 and over, there were 105.6 males.

The median income for a household in the township was $34,911, and the median income for a family was $40,298. Males had a median income of $35,563 versus $20,917 for females. The per capita income for the township was $17,438. About 13.0% of families and 13.3% of the population were below the poverty line, including 20.4% of those under age 18 and 5.0% of those age 65 or over.
