= Phillip Paul Bliss House =

Historic house in Pennsylvania, United States

- U.S. National Register of Historic Places
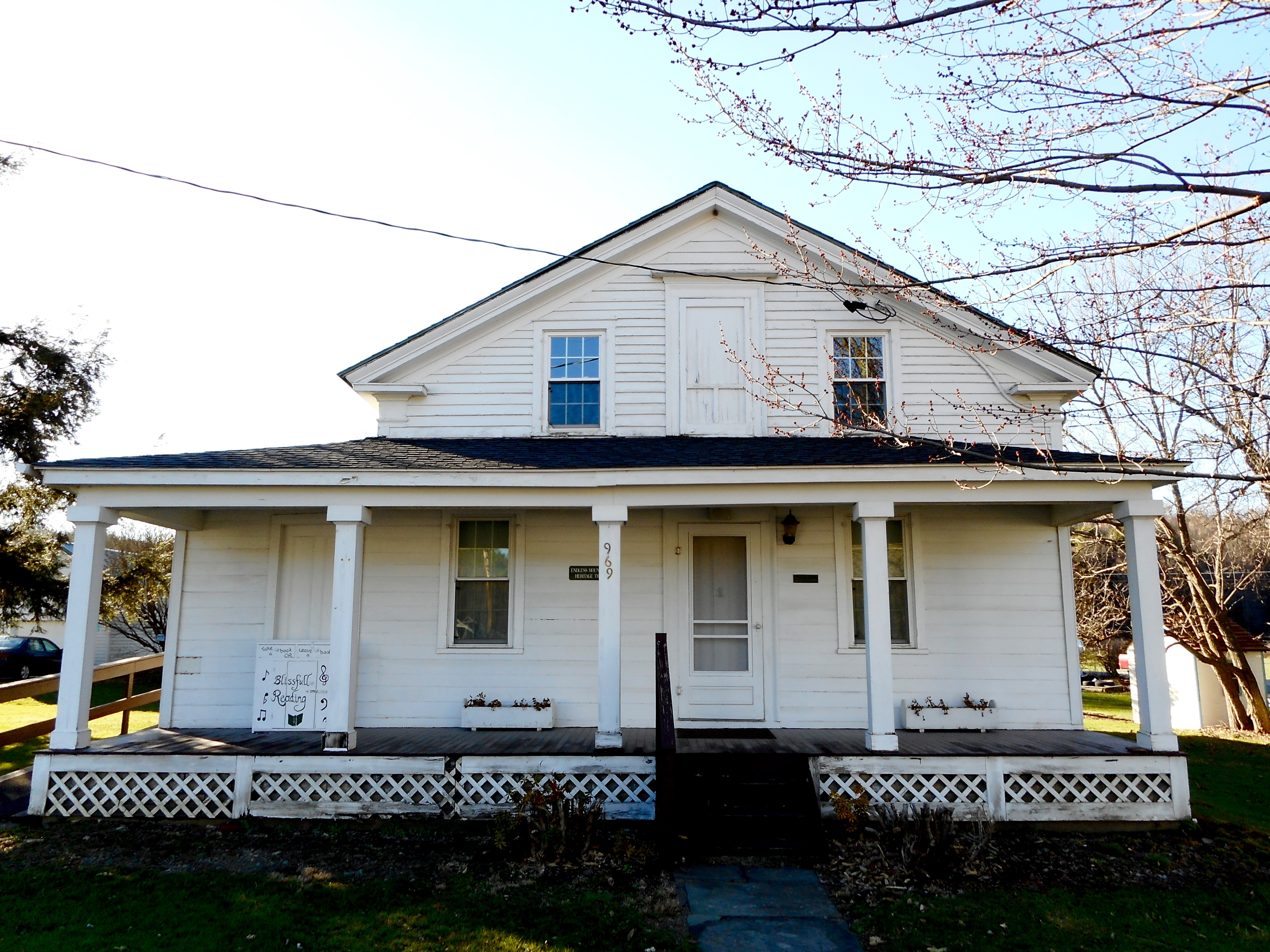

- Location within Pennsylvania Location within the United States
- Location: Main St., Rome, Pennsylvania
- Coordinates: 41°51′29″N 76°20′32″W
- Area: 0.4 acres (0.16 ha)
- Built: 1863-1864
- Architectural style: Greek Revival, Other, Vernacular Greek Revival
- NRHP reference No.: 86000865
- Added to NRHP: April 24, 1986

The Phillip Paul Bliss House is an historic home that is located in Rome, Bradford County, Pennsylvania, United States.

It was added to the National Register of Historic Places in 1986.

== History and architectural features ==
Built between 1863 and 1864, this historic structure is a vernacular, Greek Revival-style frame dwelling that consists of a two-story front section with a one-story rear ell. It has a gable roof and a full-length front porch with a shed roof, and was the home of nineteenth-century gospel music composer Phillip Paul Bliss (1838-1876). In 1965, the house was opened as the Philip P. Bliss Gospel Songwriters Museum.

== Gallery ==
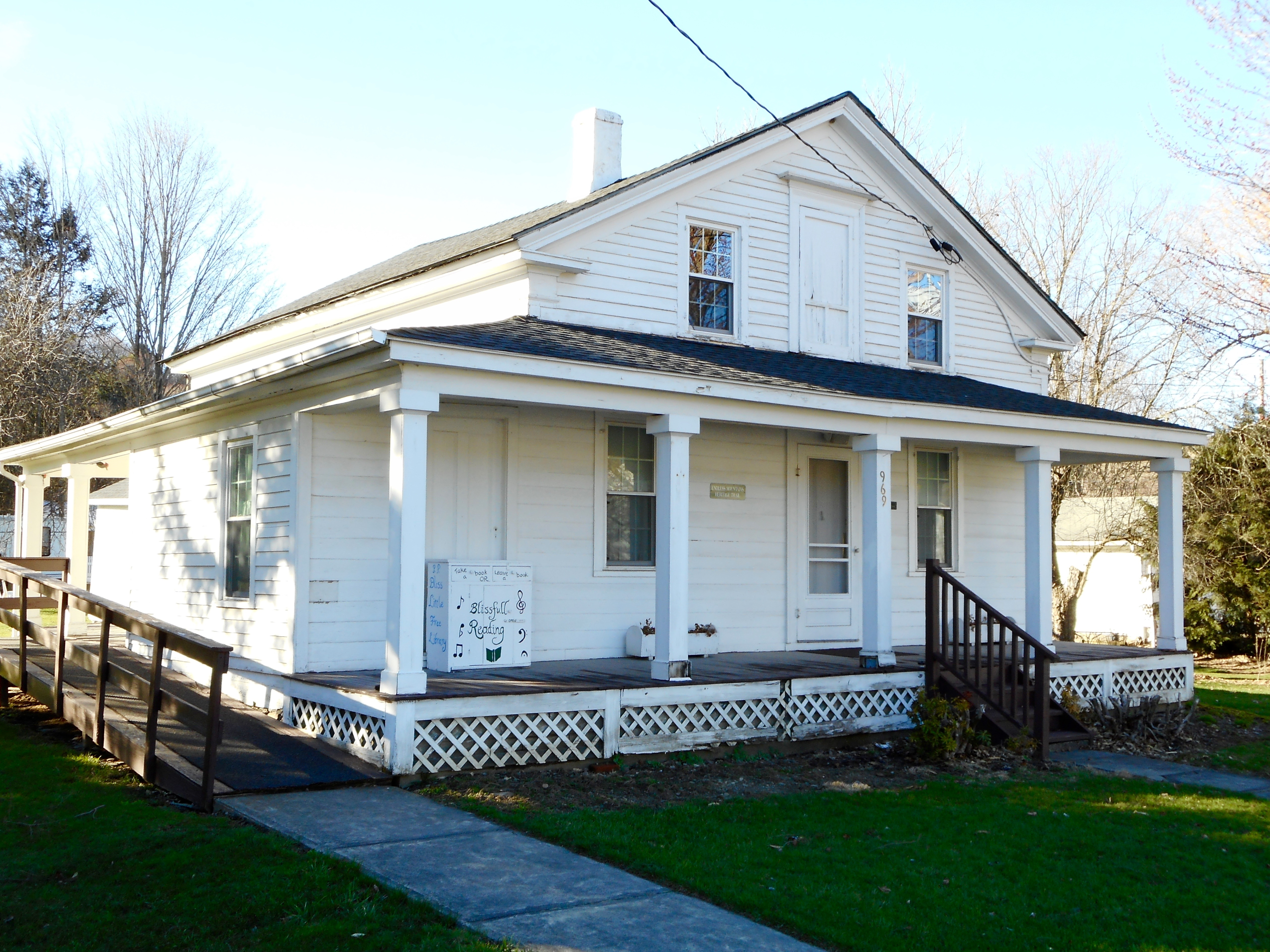
Bliss House

== See also ==
- List of music museums
