= Orwell Township, Pennsylvania =

Township in Pennsylvania, US

Coordinates: 41°52′39″N 76°16′31″W

- Township
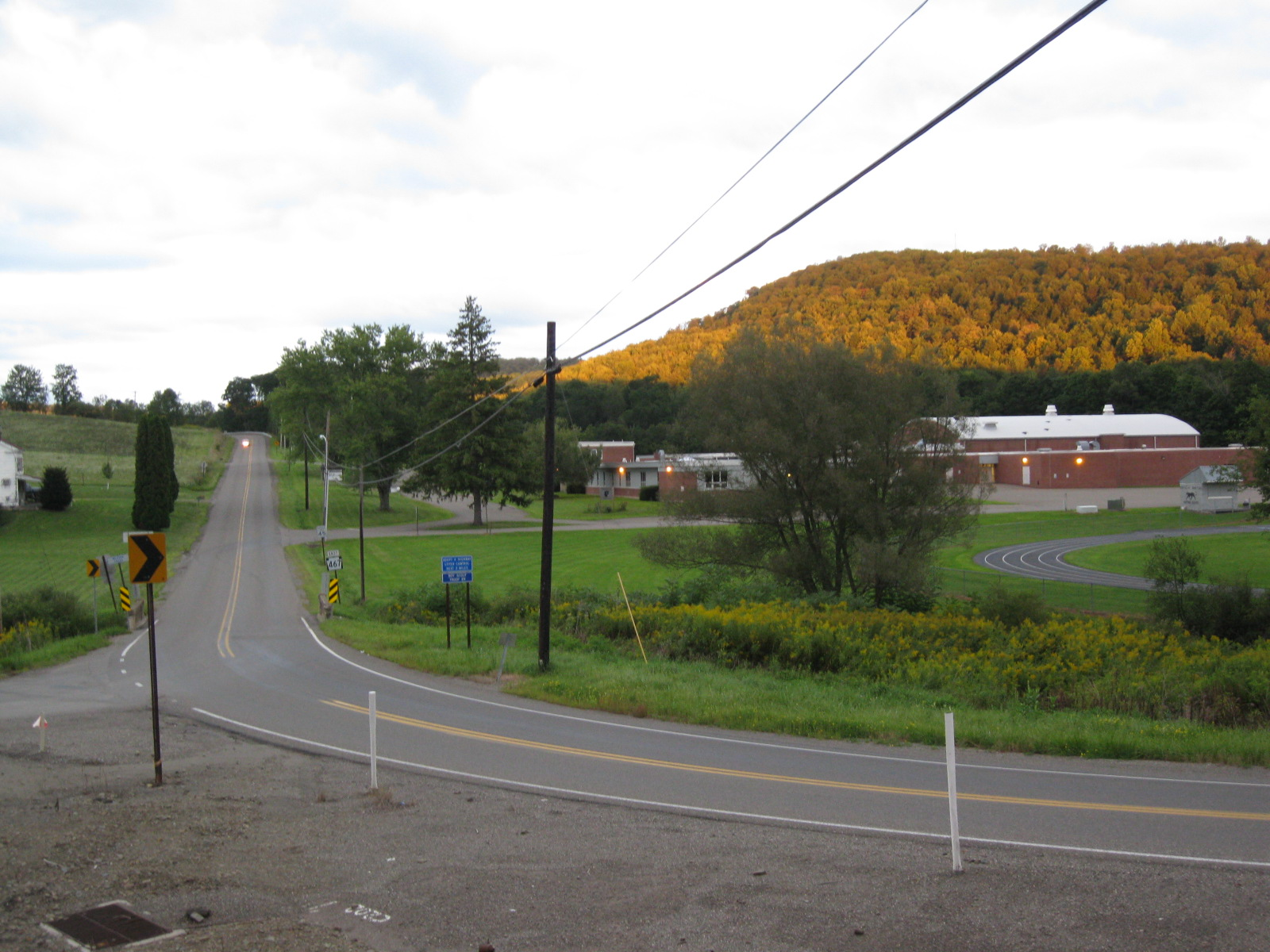
- PA 467 eastbound in Orwell Township

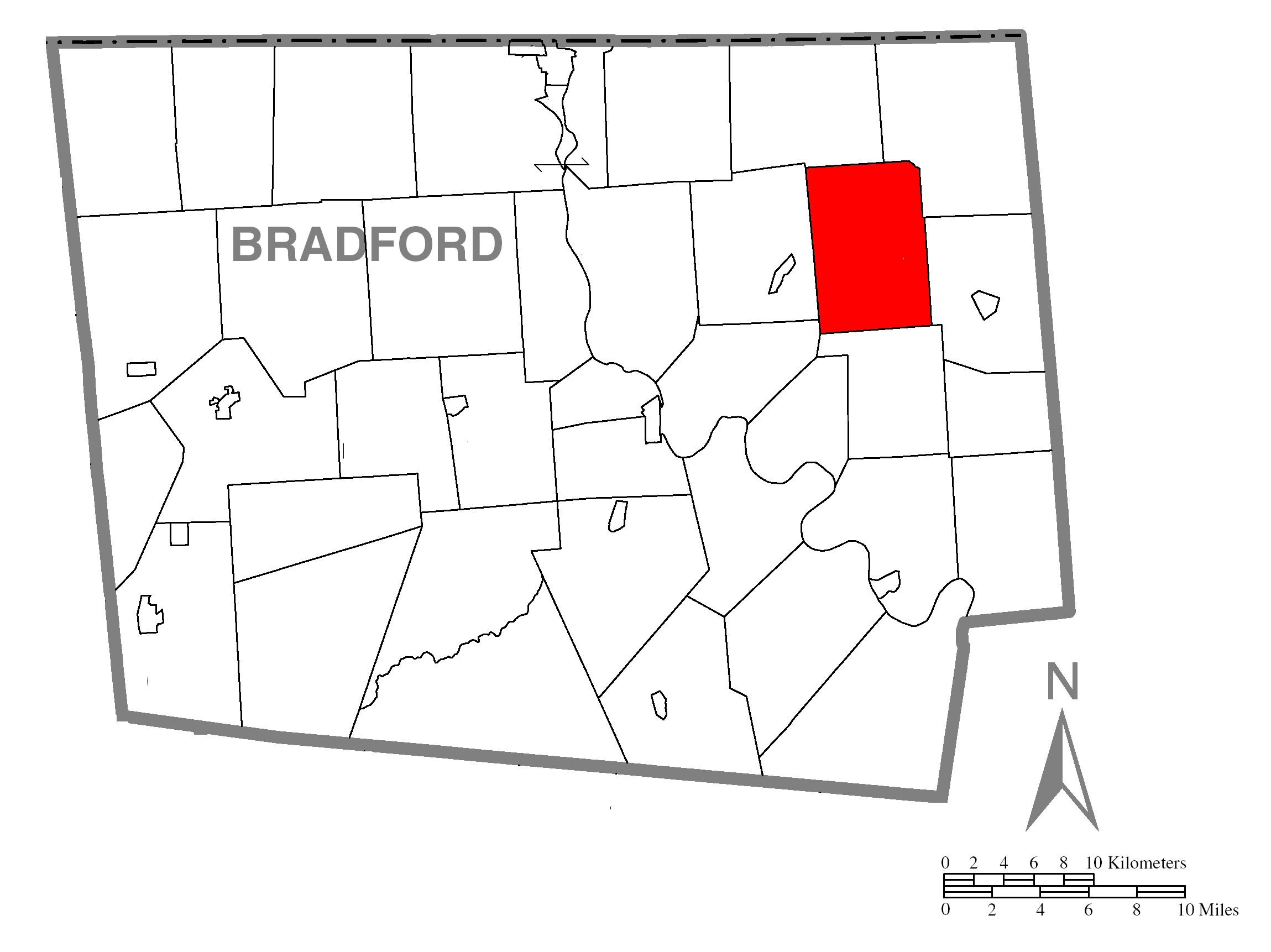
- Map of Bradford County with Orwell Township highlighted

- Map of Bradford County, Pennsylvania
- Country: United States
- State: Pennsylvania
- County: Bradford
- Settled: 1796
- Incorporated: 1801

Area
  - Total: 32.43 sq mi (83.99 km^{2})
  - Land: 32.16 sq mi (83.30 km^{2})
  - Water: 0.27 sq mi (0.69 km^{2})

Population (2020)
  - Total: 1,184
  - Estimate (2023): 1,128
  - Density: 35.1/sq mi (13.54/km^{2})
- FIPS code: 42-015-57176
- Website: https://orwelltwp.com/

Orwell Township is a township in Bradford County, Pennsylvania, United States. It is part of Northeastern Pennsylvania. The population was 1,184 at the 2020 census.

== Geography ==
Orwell Township is located in eastern Bradford County and is bordered by Windham Township to the north, Warren Township to the north and east, Pike Township to the east, Herrick Township to the south, Wysox Township to the southwest, and Rome Township to the west. Orwell Township includes the unincorporated communities of Orwell, North Orwell, Potterville, and Wells Hollow.

Pennsylvania Route 187 passes through the northwest part of the township following the valley of Wysox Creek, and Pennsylvania Route 467 passes east–west through the southern part of the township. According to the U.S. Census Bureau, the township has a total area of 32.4 square miles (84.0 km^{2}), of which 32.2 square miles (83.3 km^{2}) is land and 0.27 square miles (0.7 km^{2}), or 0.83%, is water.

== Demographics ==
Historical population
Census	Pop.	Note	%±
2010	1,159		—
2020	1,184		2.2%
2023 (est.)	1,187		0.3%
U.S. Decennial Census

As of the census of 2000, there were 1,097 people, 402 households, and 311 families residing in the township. The population density was 34.4 inhabitants per square mile (13.3/km^{2}). There were 462 housing units at an average density of 14.5/sq mi (5.6/km^{2}). The racial makeup of the township was 99.18% White, 0.18% African American, 0.09% Native American, 0.09% Asian, 0.09% from other races, and 0.36% from two or more races. Hispanic or Latino of any race were 0.73% of the population.

There were 402 households, out of which 33.8% had children under 18 living with them, 65.7% were married couples living together, 7.2% had a female householder with no husband present, and 22.4% were non-families. 17.9% of all households comprised individuals, and 8.7% had someone living alone who was 65 years of age or older. The average household size was 2.73, and the average family size was 3.07.

In the township the population was spread out, with 27.1% under the age of 18, 6.8% from 18 to 24, 29.1% from 25 to 44, 22.9% from 45 to 64, and 14.1% who were 65 years of age or older. The median age was 37 years. For every 100 females, there were 98.7 males. For every 100 females age 18 and over, there were 101.0 males.

The median income for a household in the township was $36,635, and the median income for a family was $42,500. Males had a median income of $28,889 versus $21,985 for females. The per capita income for the township was $15,055. About 3.8% of families and 6.3% of the population were below the poverty line, including 4.2% of those under age 18 and 10.2% of those age 65 or over.
