= Sheshequin Township, Pennsylvania =

Township in Pennsylvania, US

Coordinates: 41°52′24″N 76°30′02″W

- Township
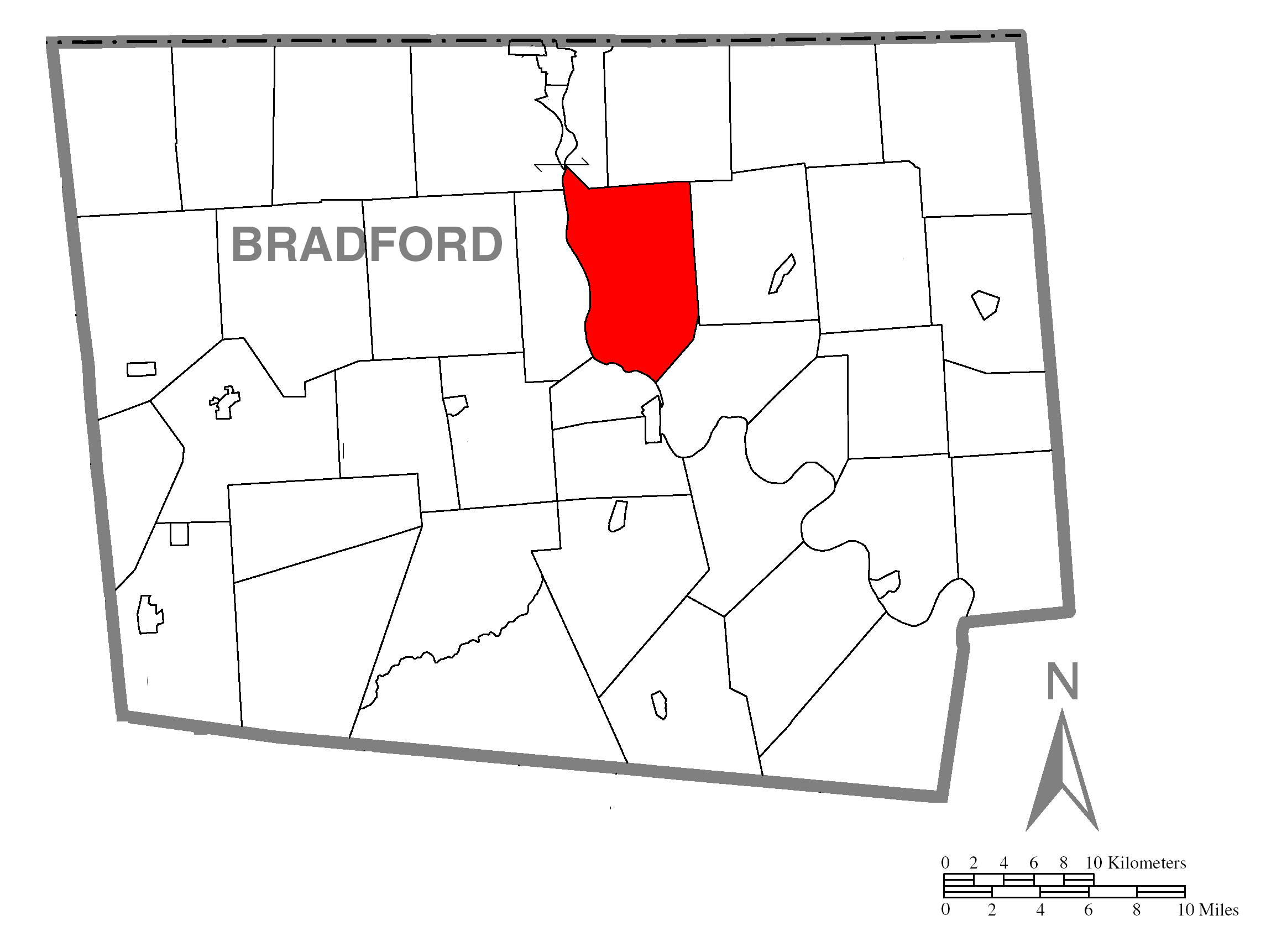
- Map of Bradford County with Sheshequin Township highlighted

- Map of Bradford County, Pennsylvania
- Country: United States
- State: Pennsylvania
- County: Bradford
- Settled: 1783
- Incorporated: 1820

Area
  - Total: 36.08 sq mi (93.45 km^{2})
  - Land: 35.35 sq mi (91.55 km^{2})
  - Water: 0.73 sq mi (1.89 km^{2})

Population (2020)
  - Total: 1,296 ▼
  - Estimate (2023): 1,282
  - Density: 36.4/sq mi (14.06/km^{2})
- FIPS code: 42-015-70208
- Website: www.sheshequintwp.org

Sheshequin Township is a township in Bradford County, Pennsylvania, United States. It is part of Northeastern Pennsylvania. The population was 1,296 at the 2020 census.

Sheshequin is a Native American name purported to mean "place of the rattle".

== Geography ==
Sheshequin Township is located north of the center of Bradford County, on the east bank of the Susquehanna River. It is bordered by Athens and Litchfield townships to the north, Rome Township to the east, Wysox Township to the southeast, North Towanda Township to the south and Ulster Township to the west. The unincorporated community of Sheshequin is in the western part of the township, at a crossing of the Susquehanna River into Ulster. A second crossing of the Susquehanna is near the southern border of the township, into North Towanda.

According to the United States Census Bureau, Sheshequin Township has a total area of 36.1 square miles (93.4 km^{2}), of which 35.4 square miles (91.6 km^{2}) is land and 0.73 square miles (1.9 km^{2}), or 2.02%, is water.

== Demographics ==
Historical population
Census	Pop.	Note	%±
2010	1,348		—
2020	1,296		−3.9%
2023 (est.)	1,282		−1.1%
U.S. Decennial Census

As of the census of 2000, there were 1,289 people, 483 households, and 371 families residing in the township. The population density was 36.8 inhabitants per square mile (14.2/km^{2}). There were 563 housing units at an average density of 15.1/sq mi (6.2/km^{2}). The racial makeup of the township was 98.38% White, 0.23% African American, 0.23% Native American, 0.10% Asian, 0.08% from other races, and 1.00% from two or more races. Hispanic or Latino of any race were 0.08% of the population.

There were 483 households, out of which 33.1% had children under the age of 18 living with them, 66.3% were married couples living together, 7.0% had a female householder with no husband present, and 23.1% were non-families. 19.6% of all households were made up of individuals, and 7.4% had someone living alone who was 65 years of age or older. The average household size was 2.66 and the average family size was 3.03.

In the township the population was spread out, with 21.2% under the age of 18, 6.1% from 18 to 24, 29.2% from 25 to 44, 25.1% from 45 to 64, and 12.5% who were 65 years of age or older. The median age was 38 years. For every 100 females, there were 103.8 males. For every 100 females age 18 and over, there were 103.4 males.

The median income for a household in the township was $37,222, and the median income for a family was $42,500. Males had a median income of $31,667 versus $22,065 for females. The per capita income for the township was $16,017. About 8.0% of families and 11.6% of the population were below the poverty line, including 18.1% of those under age 18 and 9.1% of those age 65 or over.

== Notable person ==
- Julia H. Scott (1809–1842), poet of Sheshequin
