= Pennsylvania Route 187 =

State highway in Pennsylvania, US

Pennsylvania Route 187

Route information
- Maintained by PennDOT
- Length: 43.131 mi (69.413 km)

Major junctions
- South end: PA 87 in Lovelton
- US 6 in Wysox; PA 467 near Rome
- North end: NY 282 at the New York state line in Windham Township

Location
- Country: United States
- State: Pennsylvania
- Counties: Bradford, Wyoming

Highway system
- Pennsylvania State Route System; Interstate; US; State; Scenic; Legislative
← PA 186	→ PA 188

Pennsylvania Route 187 (PA 187) is a 43.1-mile-long (69.4 km) state highway located in Wyoming and Bradford counties in Pennsylvania. The southern terminus is at PA 87 in Lovelton. The northern terminus is at the New York state line, north of Windham Center. The route continues as New York State Route 282 (NY 282) for 3 1/2 miles (5.6 km) north to its terminus at NY 17C.

== Route description ==
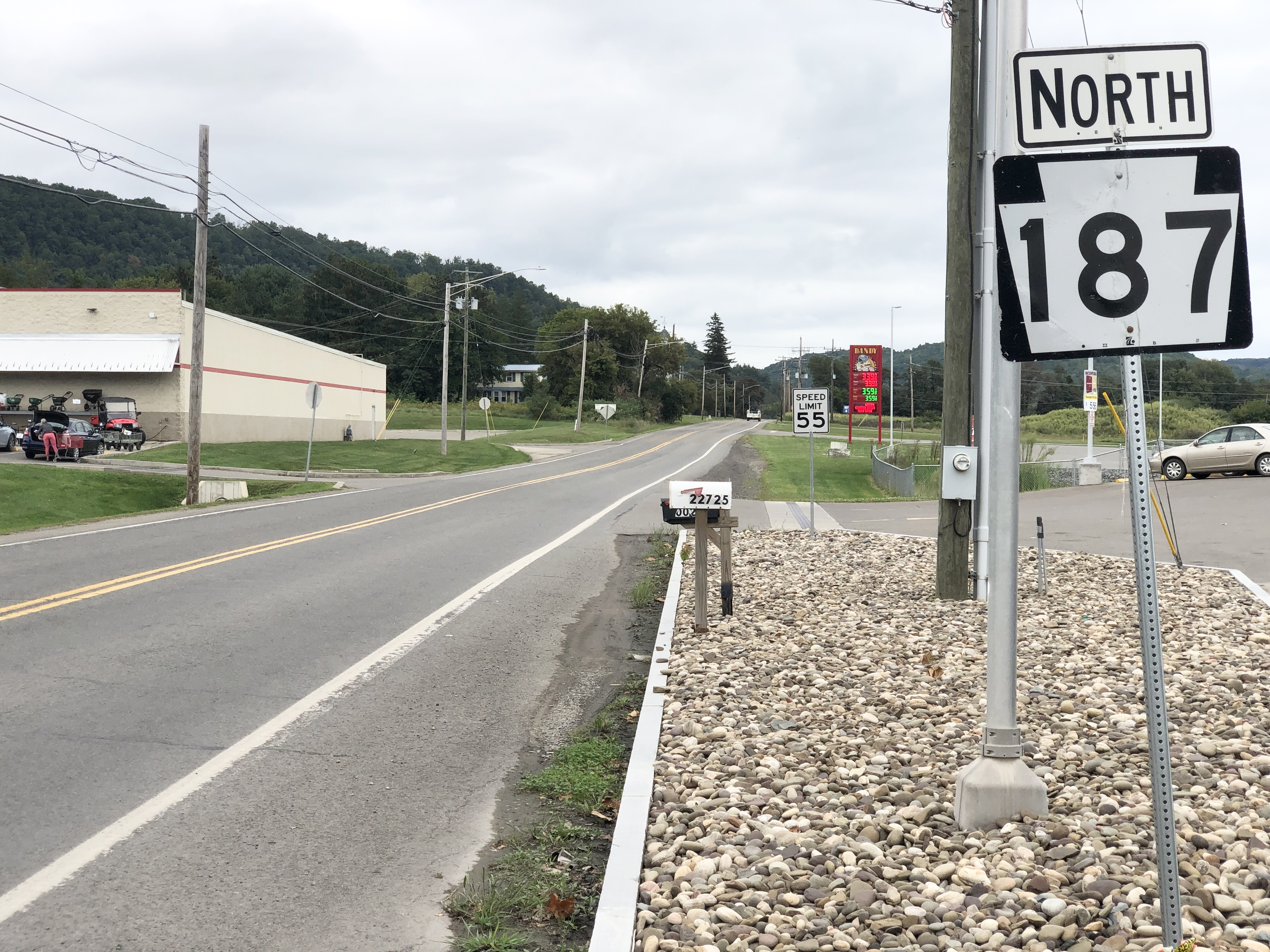
PA 187 northbound at US 6 in Wysox

PA 187 begins at an intersection with PA 87 in North Branch Township, Wyoming County, heading north on a two-lane undivided road. The road passes through Lovelton and heads north-northwest through forested areas with some farm fields and homes. The route heads into agricultural areas and turns to the west.

PA 187 enters Wilmot Township in Bradford County and curves to the northwest, running through more farmland and woodland with some homes. The road heads into more forested areas, turning to the north-northeast at Hollenback. The route winds north through more forests with some small fields and homes, turning northwest at Sugar Run and running along the southwest bank of the North Branch Susquehanna River. PA 187 continues through more rural areas along the riverbank, crossing into Terry Township and curving north into agricultural areas with some homes at Terrytown. In Hortons Corners, the route turns west away from the river, winding west through a mix of farmland and woodland with some homes. The road passes through Viall Hill before turning northwest into Asylum Township, continuing into more forested areas and running more north. PA 187 turns northwest into agricultural areas, curving to the north in Durell and running through farms and woods with some residences. The road curves to the northwest again and runs to the southwest of the North Branch Susquehanna River, heading farther from the river as it passes through Macedonia. The route crosses the North Branch Susquehanna River into Wysox Township and continues into agricultural areas with some development, turning north and crossing the Lehigh Secondary railroad line, which is owned by Norfolk Southern and operated by the Lehigh Railway, before intersecting U.S. Route 6 (US 6).

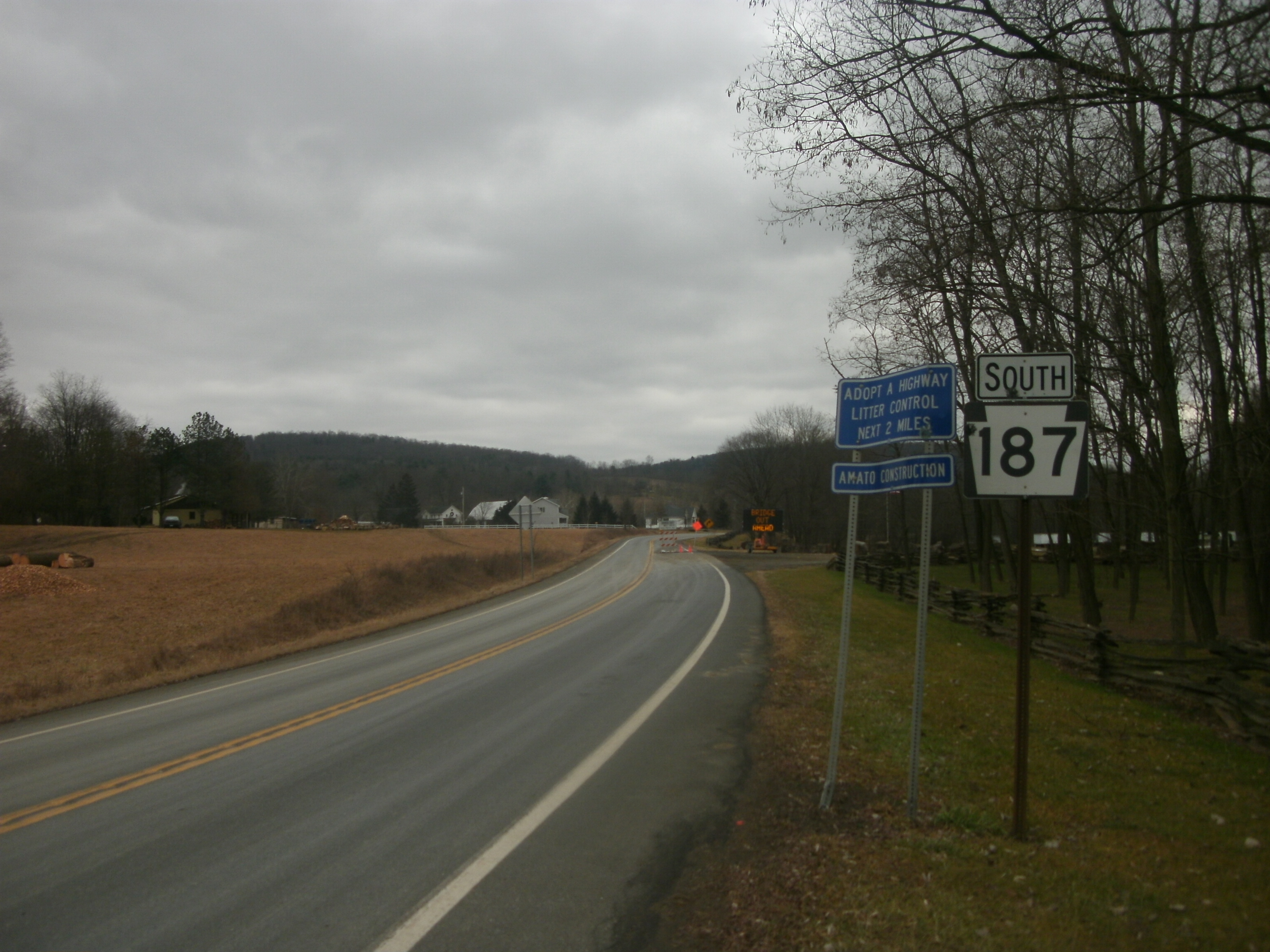
PA 187 facing southbound from the New York state line in Windham Township

Past this intersection, PA 187 turns northeast and runs through farm fields before heading into a mix of farmland and woodland with some homes, passing through Myersburg. The road continues through more rural areas to the west Wysox Creek, becoming Rome Road. The route heads into more wooded areas with some homes and crosses into Rome Township, turning north at an intersection with the western terminus of PA 467. PA 187 heads into agricultural areas with some homes and enters Rome, becoming Main Street. The road heads past homes, curving to the north-northeast. The route heads into farmland with some homes and crosses back into Rome Township, continuing northeast as an unnamed road. PA 187 runs through more fields and woods with some homes, crossing into Orwell Township and curving to the north before heading northwest. The road turns to the northeast and passes through North Orwell, continuing through more agricultural areas with some woods and homes as it heads into Windham Township and passes through West Windham. The route curves northwest through forested areas with some homes before passing through Windham Center and winding northwest through farmland and woodland with occasional residences. PA 187 reaches its northern terminus at the New York border, where the road continues into that state as NY 282.

== Major intersections ==
County	Location	mi	km	Destinations	Notes
Wyoming	North Branch Township	0.000	0.000	PA 87 / Catlin Hollow Road – Mehoopany, Dushore	Southern terminus
Bradford	Wysox Township	24.220	38.978	US 6 (Grand Army of the Republic Highway) – Towanda, Wyalusing	
Bradford	Rome Township	29.010	46.687	PA 467 east – LeRaysville	Western terminus of PA 467
Bradford	Windham Township	43.131	69.413	NY 282 north (South Main Street) – Nichols	New York state line; northern terminus
1.000 mi = 1.609 km; 1.000 km = 0.621 mi
