= Julia H. Scott =

American poet

Julia Hutchinson Kinney Scott
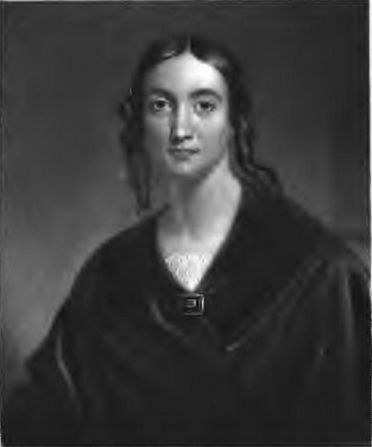
- Born: November 4, 1809; Sheshequin, Bradford County, Pennsylvania, U.S.
- Died: March 5, 1842 (aged 32); Towanda, Pennsylvania, U.S.
- Occupation: writer
- Spouse: David L. Scott (m. 1835)
- Writing career
- Genres: poetry; prose
- Subject: Universalist religion

Julia H. Scott (née, Kinney; November 4, 1809 – March 5, 1842) was an American writer who had the distinction of being the Poet of Sheshequin. She wrote numerous articles of prose and poetry, which were published in many of the most popular literary periodicals in the U.S. She was a prominent literary figure in the Universalist religion, along with Sarah Carter Edgarton Mayo and Caroline Mehitable Fisher Sawyer.

== Biography ==
Julia Hutchinson Kinney was born in Sheshequin, Bradford County, Pennsylvania, November 4, 1809. Her parents were George Kinney (d. 1862) and Mary Carner Kinney (1787-1863). Her siblings were George Wayne, Horace, Newcomb, W. Wallace, O. H. Perry, Mary, and Somers.

Before marriage, Scott wrote many fugitive pieces for the periodicals, in prose and verse. She wrote more considerably for the religious magazines and journals of her own order (Universalist) of which she was an eminent member. Without possessing remarkable powers of fancy or delineation, and avoiding the portrayal or excitement of stern passion, her writings were prized for their purity, sweetness, and piety. She also contributed to purely literary periodicals. Her poems were collected and two editions published.

Scott taught school in Towanda, Pennsylvania, and that is where she met Dr. David L. Scott. They married on May 2, 1835, in Sheshequin. After marriage, they removed to Towanda, about 10 miles (16 km) from her birthplace.

== Death and legacy ==
Scott died of consumption in Towanda, March 5, 1842, in her thirty-third year.

After her death, a volume of her Poems was published, with a memoir by Sarah Carter Edgarton Mayo.

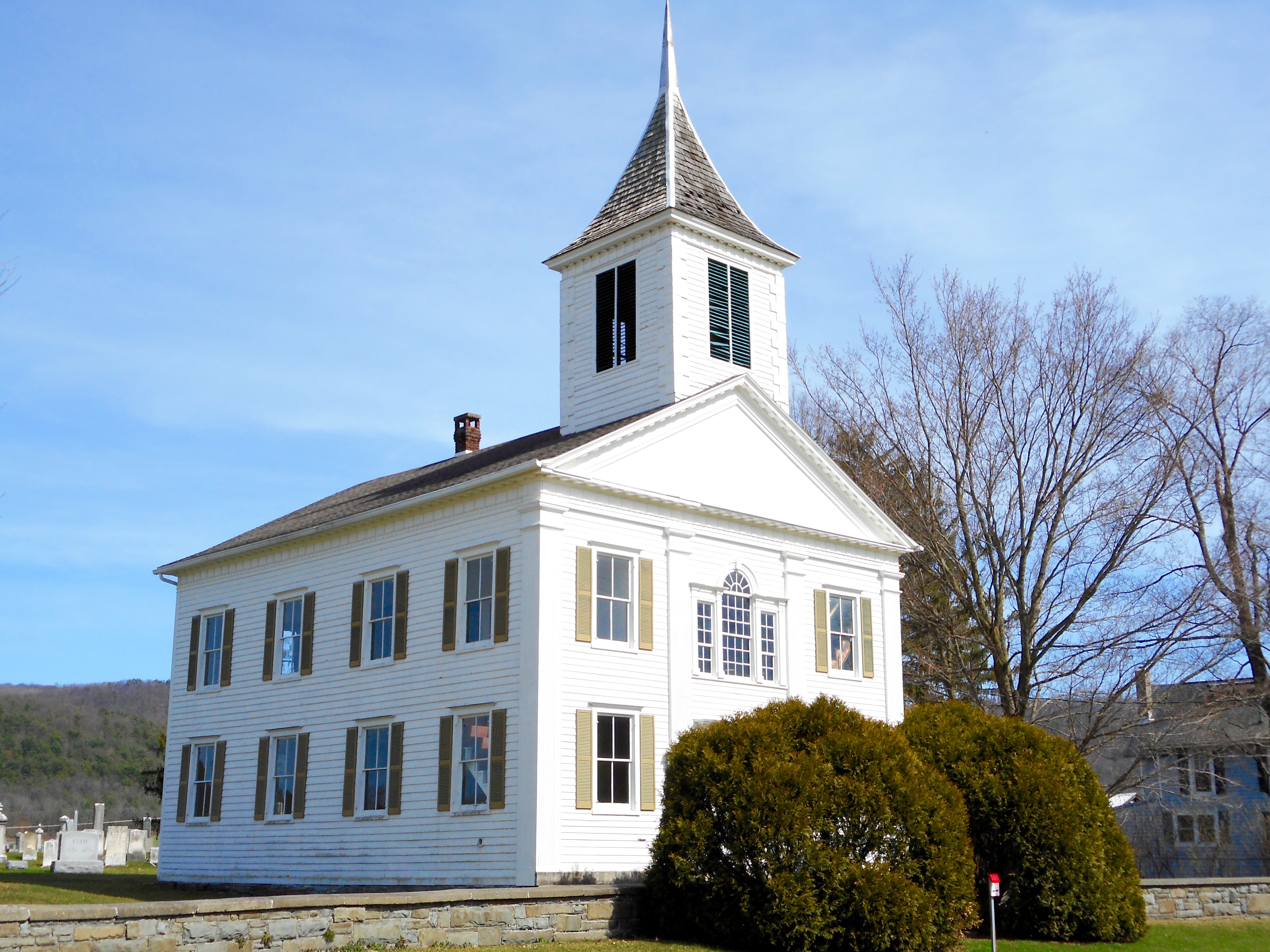
Universalist Church, Bradford County, PA, listed on the NRHP

The first Sunday school in Sheshequin was conducted in 1830 by Scott. A tablet on the Universalist Church in Bradford County on Route 354 commemorates this fact and includes the names of other people associated with this church.

== Selected works ==
Her publications include:

- The sacrifice: a clergyman's story, 1834
- Poems, 1843
- Memoir, 1860
