= Litchfield Township, Bradford County, Pennsylvania =

Township in Pennsylvania, US

Coordinates: 41°57′06″N 76°25′58″W

Litchfield Township, Pennsylvania
- Township
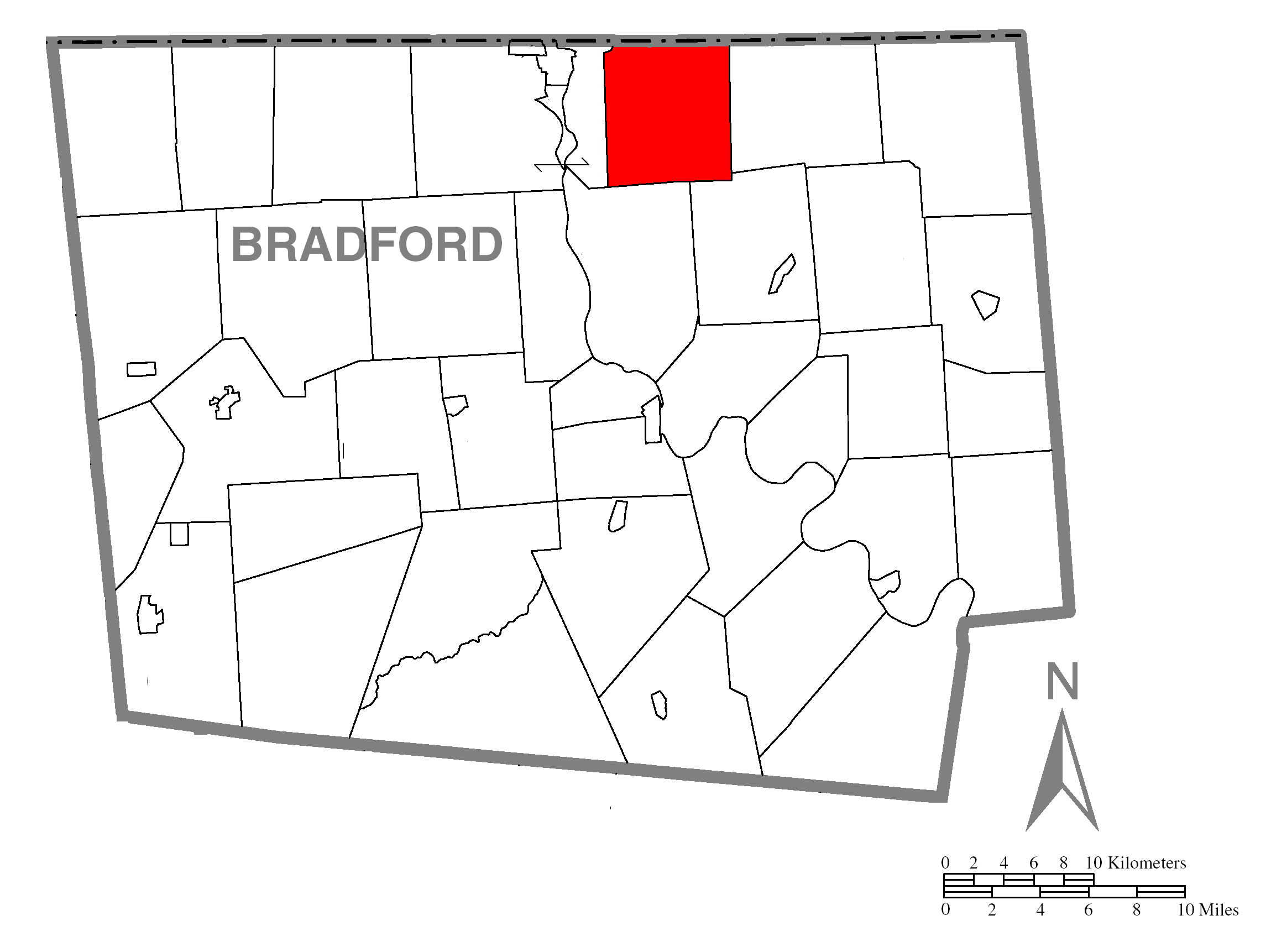
- Map of Bradford County with Litchfield Township highlighted

- Map of Bradford County, Pennsylvania
- Country: United States
- State: Pennsylvania
- County: Bradford
- Settled: 1788
- Incorporated: 1821

Area
  - Total: 30.40 sq mi (78.74 km^{2})
  - Land: 30.17 sq mi (78.13 km^{2})
  - Water: 0.24 sq mi (0.61 km^{2})

Population (2020)
  - Total: 1,276 ▼
  - Estimate (2023): 1,269
  - Density: 43.3/sq mi (16.72/km^{2})
- ZIP Code: 18810, 18840
- Area code: 570
- FIPS code: 42-015-43792

Litchfield Township is a township in Bradford County, Pennsylvania, United States. It is part of Northeastern Pennsylvania. As of the 2020 census it had a population of 1,276.

== Geography ==
Litchfield Township is located in northern Bradford County, along the New York state line. It is bordered by Windham Township to the east, Rome Township to the east and south, Sheshequin Township to the south and Athens Township to the west. To the north, in Tioga County, New York, is the town of Nichols.

According to the United States Census Bureau, the township has a total area of 30.4 square miles (78.7 km^{2}), of which 30.2 square miles (78.1 km^{2}) is land and 0.23 square miles (0.6 km^{2}), or 0.77%, is water. Children residing in the township are assigned to attend the Sayre Area School District.

== Demographics ==
Historical population
Census	Pop.	Note	%±
2010	1,320		—
2020	1,276		−3.3%
2023 (est.)	1,269		−0.5%
U.S. Decennial Census

As of the census of 2000, there were 1,307 people, 501 households, and 401 families residing in the township. The population density was 43.4 inhabitants per square mile (16.8/km^{2}). There were 546 housing units at an average density of 18.1/sq mi (7.0/km^{2}). The racial makeup of the township was 97.78% White, 0.23% African American, 0.77% Native American, 0.23% Asian, 0.15% Pacific Islander, 0.08% from other races, and 0.77% from two or more races. Hispanic or Latino of any race were 0.54% of the population.

There were 501 households, out of which 33.3% had children under the age of 18 living with them, 69.9% were married couples living together, 4.8% had a female householder with no husband present, and 19.8% were non-families. 16.6% of all households were made up of individuals, and 5.2% had someone living alone who was 65 years of age or older. The average household size was 2.61 and the average family size was 2.90.

In the township the population was spread out, with 25.7% under the age of 18, 4.6% from 18 to 24, 28.8% from 25 to 44, 28.1% from 45 to 64, and 12.8% who were 65 years of age or older. The median age was 40 years. For every 100 females, there were 103.3 males. For every 100 females age 18 and over, there were 107.9 males.

The median income for a household in the township was $37,986, and the median income for a family was $41,576. Males had a median income of $30,923 versus $21,050 for females. The per capita income for the township was $16,874. About 5.2% of families and 7.8% of the population were below the poverty line, including 10.0% of those under age 18 and 3.6% of those age 65 or over.
