= Wysox Creek =

Creek in Pennsylvania, United States

Coordinates: 41.87022°N 76.32116°W

Wysox Creek is a tributary of the Susquehanna River in Bradford County, Pennsylvania, in the United States. It is approximately 15.0 miles (24.1 km) long and flows through Windham Township, Orwell Township, Rome Township, and Wysox Township. It is possible to canoe on part of the creek's length.

== Course ==
Wysox Creek begins on a hill in Windham Township. It flows east for a short distance and leaves the hill. The creek then turns south and flows through a valley for several miles, flowing parallel to Pennsylvania Route 187. It eventually enters Orwell Township, where it receives the tributary Trout Brook and flows through North Orwell and Russelville. Several miles downstream, the creek picks up the tributary Trout Stream and turns southwest, still flowing parallel to Pennsylvania Route 187 in its valley. It eventually enters Rome Township, Bradford County, Pennsylvania, where it receives Parks Creek and passes through the community of Rome. Downstream of Rome, the creek turns south-southwest and picks up Ballard Creek. Some distance downstream, it enters Wysox Township, where it continues southwest and south-southwest. It receives several more tributaries before crossing U.S. Route 6 and reaching its confluence with the Susquehanna River.

Wysox Creek joins the Susquehanna River 268.56 miles (432.21 km) upstream of its mouth.

== Watershed and geography ==
The watershed of Wysox Creek has an area of 101 square miles (260 km^{2}).

There are some strainers on Wysox Creek. There are also gravel bar riffles on the creek. It flows through a flat and narrow valley and for much of its length flows through forested floodplains.

== Recreation ==
It is possible to canoe on 6.3 miles (10.1 km) of Wysox Creek during snowmelt or within several days of heavy rain. The difficulty rating of the creek is 1+. Edward Gertler describes its scenery as "good" in his book Keystone Canoeing.

== See also ==
- List of rivers of Pennsylvania
