= Terry Township, Pennsylvania =

Township in Pennsylvania, US

Coordinates: 41.660°N 76.345°W

- Township
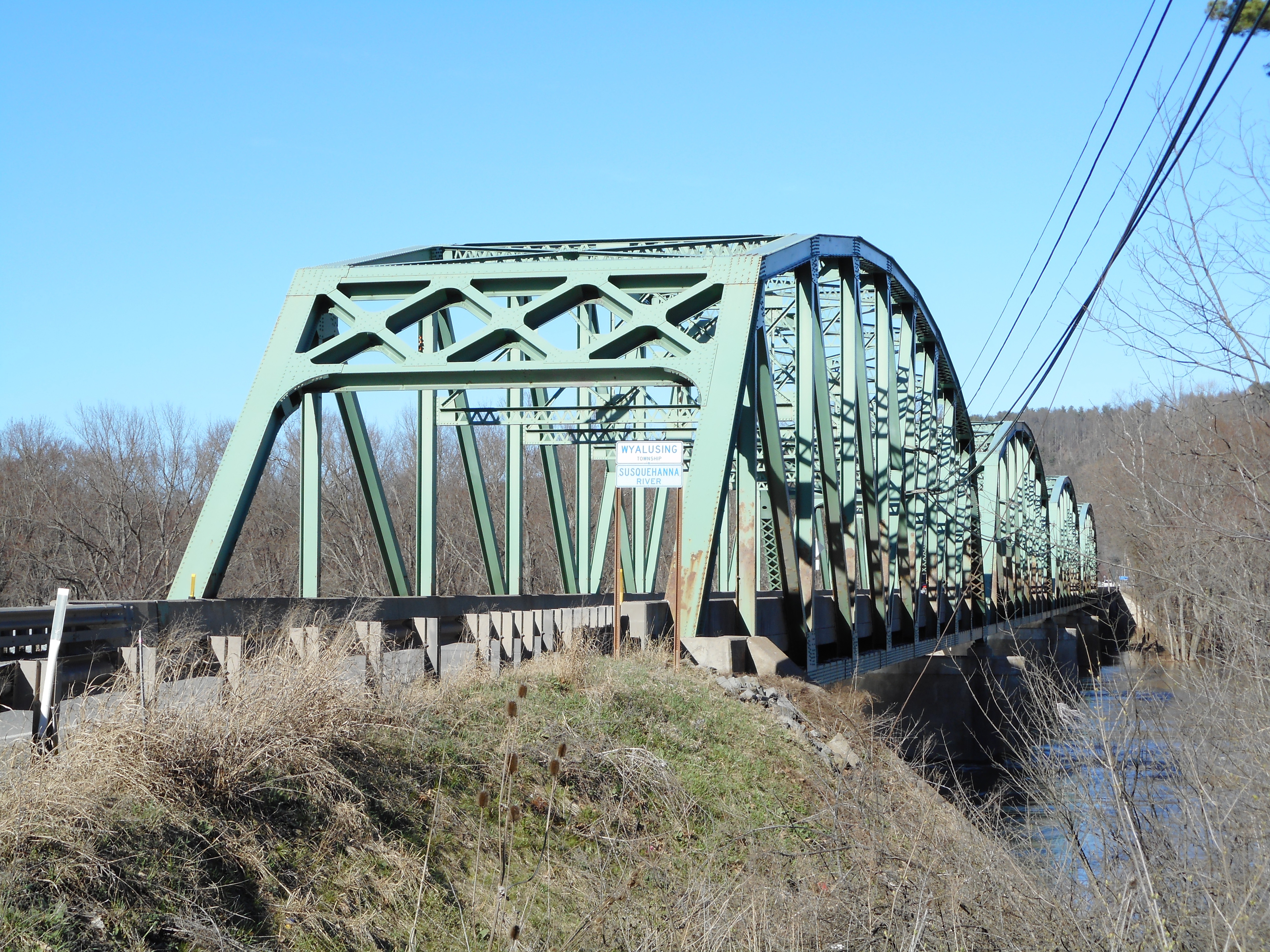
- Bridge over the Susquehanna River

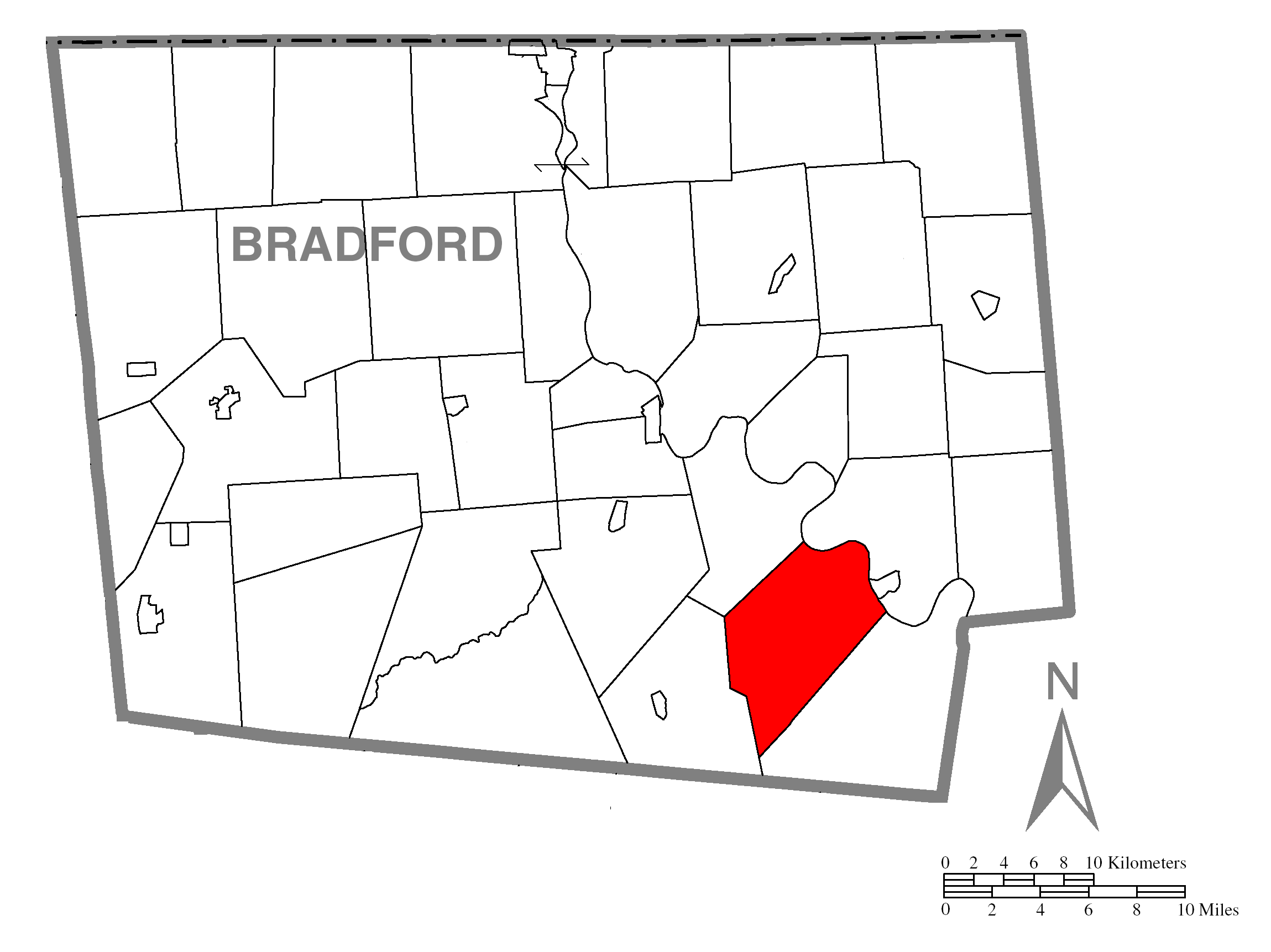
- Map of Bradford County with Terry Township highlighted

- Map of Bradford County, Pennsylvania
- Country: United States
- State: Pennsylvania
- County: Bradford
- Settled: 1787
- Incorporated: 1859

Area
  - Total: 33.37 sq mi (86.42 km^{2})
  - Land: 32.57 sq mi (84.35 km^{2})
  - Water: 0.80 sq mi (2.07 km^{2})

Population (2010)
  - Total: 992
  - Estimate (2016): 952
  - Density: 29.2/sq mi (11.29/km^{2})
- Area code: 570
- FIPS code: 42-015-76408

Terry Township is a township in Bradford County, Pennsylvania. The population was 992 at the 2010 census.

== Geography ==
Terry Township is located in southeastern Bradford County and is bordered by Wilmot Township to the southeast, Albany Township to the west, and Asylum Township to the northwest. The Susquehanna River forms a winding border with Wyalusing Township to the north and east. The borough of Wyalusing also lies across the river.

Pennsylvania Route 187 passes through the township in the same general direction as the Susquehanna River. Where it approaches the west bank of the river, it passes through the unincorporated communities of Terrytown and Cherrytown. A bridge over the Susquehanna near the southeastern border of the township connects Route 187 with Wyalusing Township, just south of the borough of Wyalusing.

According to the U.S. Census Bureau, Terry Township has a total area of 33.4 square miles (86.4 km^{2}), of which 32.5 square miles (84.3 km^{2}) is land and 0.81 square miles (2.1 km^{2}), or 2.40%, is water.

== Demographics ==
Historical population
| Census | Pop. | Note | %± |
|---|---|---|---|
| 2010 | 992 | | — |
| 2016 (est.) | 952 | | −4.0% |
U.S. Decennial Census

As of the census of 2000, there were 942 people, 364 households, and 267 families residing in the township. The population density was 28.8 inhabitants per square mile (11.1/km^{2}). There were 534 housing units at an average density of 16.3/sq mi (6.3/km^{2}). The racial makeup of the township was 97.24% White, 0.21% African American, 0.53% Native American, 0.32% Asian, 1.27% from other races, and 0.42% from two or more races. Hispanic or Latino of any race were 1.49% of the population.

There were 364 households, out of which 31.6% had children under the age of 18 living with them, 61.8% were married couples living together, 6.3% had a female householder with no husband present, and 26.4% were non-families. 20.3% of all households were made up of individuals, and 6.3% had someone living alone who was 65 years of age or older. The average household size was 2.57 and the average family size was 2.96.

In the township, the population was spread out, with 23.2% under the age of 18, 8.4% from 18 to 24, 29.1% from 25 to 44, 27.1% from 45 to 64, and 12.2% who were 65 years of age or older. The median age was 39 years. For every 100 females, there were 104.8 males. For every 100 females age 18 and over, there were 114.5 males. The median income for a household in the township was $37,614, and the median income for a family was $46,000. Males had a median income of $30,417 versus $21,359 for females. The per capita income for the township was $16,352. About 6.8% of families and 9.1% of the population were below the poverty line, including 6.9% of those under age 18 and 18.2% of those age 65 or over.
