= Sugar Run (Todd Fork tributary) =

Stream in Ohio, U.S.

Coordinates: 39°20′43″N 84°04′41″W

Sugar Run is a stream in the U.S. state of Ohio. It is a tributary to Todd Fork.

Sugar Run most likely was named for the sugar maple timber along its course. A variant name was "Sugar Creek".
