= Sugar Run, Pennsylvania =

Unincorporated community in Pennsylvania, US

- Unincorporated community
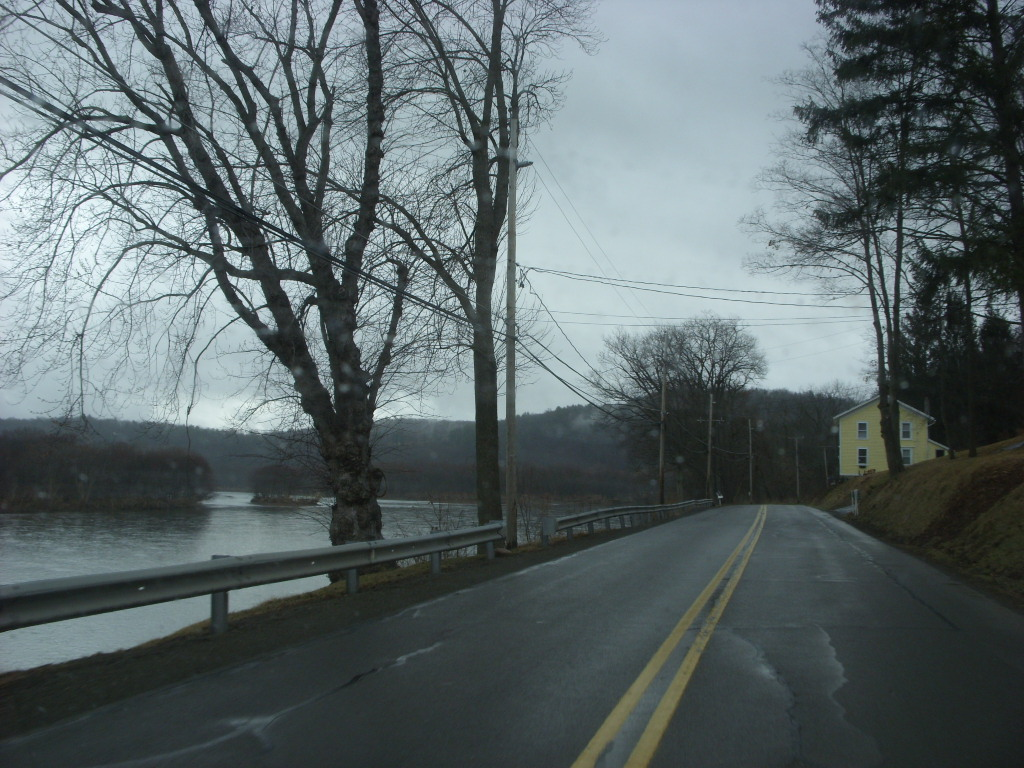
- PA 187 southbound in Sugar Run

- Location within Pennsylvania
- Coordinates: 41°38′32″N 76°14′30″W
- Country: United States
- State: Pennsylvania
- County: Bradford
- Elevation: 709 ft (216 m)
- Time zone: UTC-5 (Eastern (EST))
  - Summer (DST): UTC-4 (EDT)
- ZIP code: 18846
- Area codes: 272 & 570
- GNIS feature ID: 1188961

Sugar Run is an unincorporated community in Bradford County, Pennsylvania, United States. The community is located along the Susquehanna River and Pennsylvania Route 187, 2.1 miles (3.4 km) southeast of Wyalusing. Sugar Run has a post office with ZIP code 18846.
