= Wysox Township, Pennsylvania =

Township in Pennsylvania, US

Coordinates: 41°47′08″N 76°24′06″W

- Township
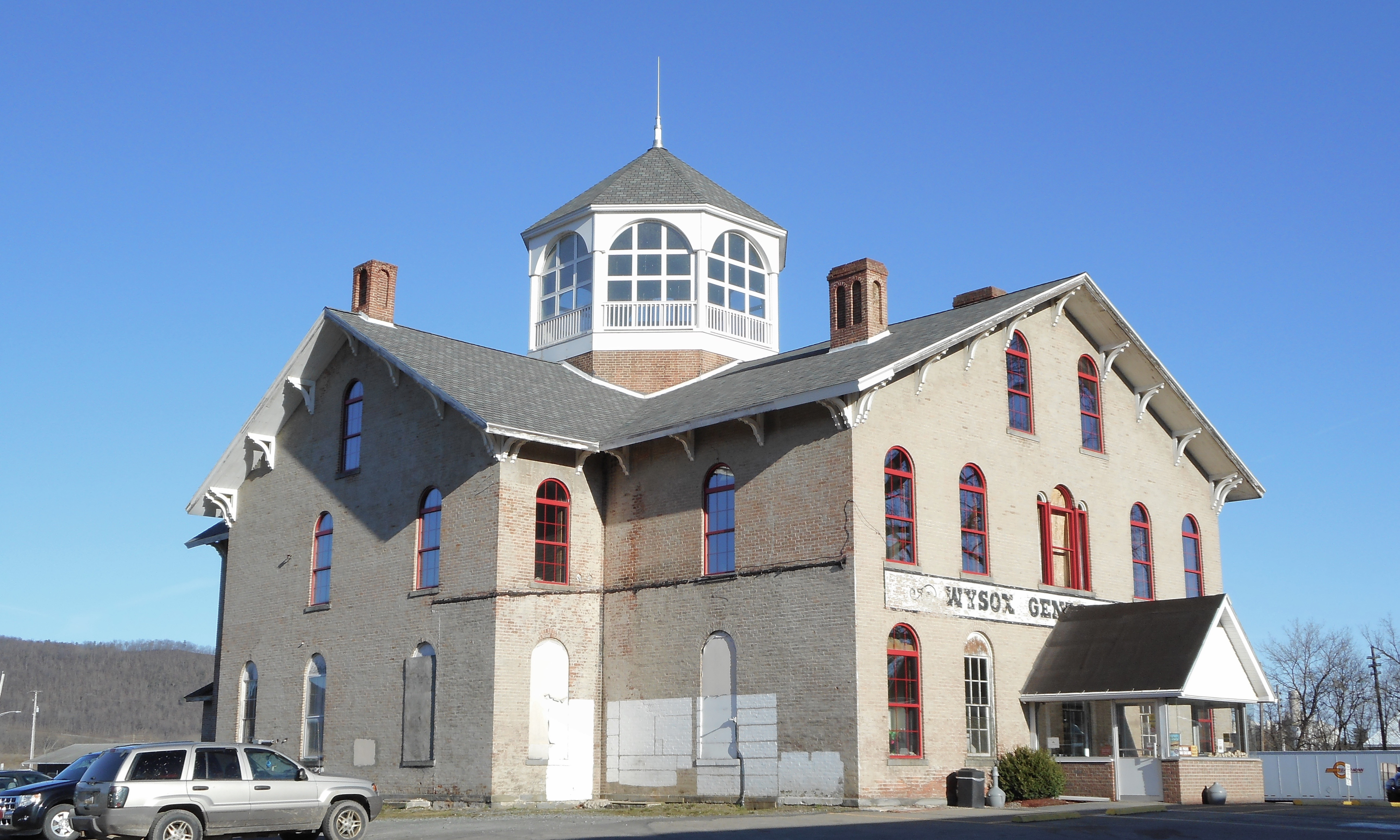
- Wysox General Store

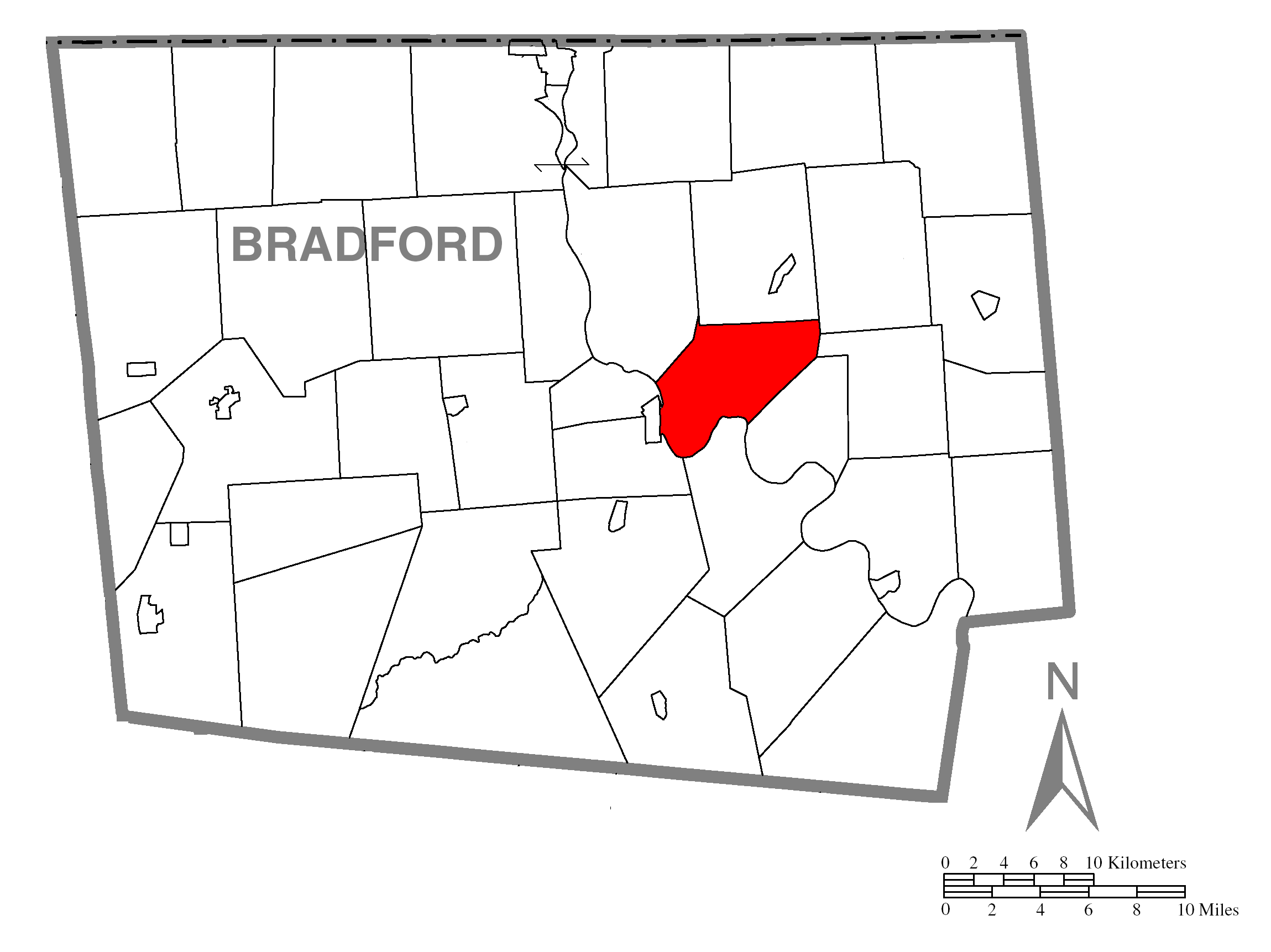
- Map of Bradford County with Wysox Township highlighted

- Map of Bradford County, Pennsylvania
- Country: United States
- State: Pennsylvania
- County: Bradford
- Settled: 1785
- Incorporated: 1795

Government
  - Chairman: Evan Barnes

Area
  - Total: 23.32 sq mi (60.41 km^{2})
  - Land: 22.72 sq mi (58.85 km^{2})
  - Water: 0.60 sq mi (1.56 km^{2})
- Elevation: 715 ft (218 m)

Population (2010)
  - Total: 1,721
  - Estimate (2016): 1,657
  - Density: 72.9/sq mi (28.16/km^{2})
- Area code: 570
- FIPS code: 42-015-86912
- Website: https://wysoxtownship.org/

Wysox Township is a township in Bradford County, Pennsylvania. It is part of Northeastern Pennsylvania. The population was 1,721 at the 2010 census.

== Geography ==
Wysox Township is located in east-central Bradford County, along the northeast bank of the Susquehanna River. It is bordered by Sheshequin Township to the northwest, Rome Township to the north, Orwell and Herrick townships to the east, and Standing Stone Township to the southeast. Across the Susquehanna, Asylum Township is to the south, Towanda Township is to the southwest, and the borough of Towanda and North Towanda Township are to the west. The unincorporated communities of Wysox and East Towanda are in the southern part of the township, and Myersburg is near the center of the township, in the valley of Wysox Creek.

According to the U.S. Census Bureau, 23.3 square miles (60.4 km^{2}), of which 22.7 square miles (58.9 km^{2}) is land and 0.62 square miles (1.6 km^{2}), or 2.58%, is water.

== History ==
Wysox was founded in 1795. Its name comes from a Native American word meaning "canoe harbor." The Lehigh Valley Railroad used to run through Wysox.

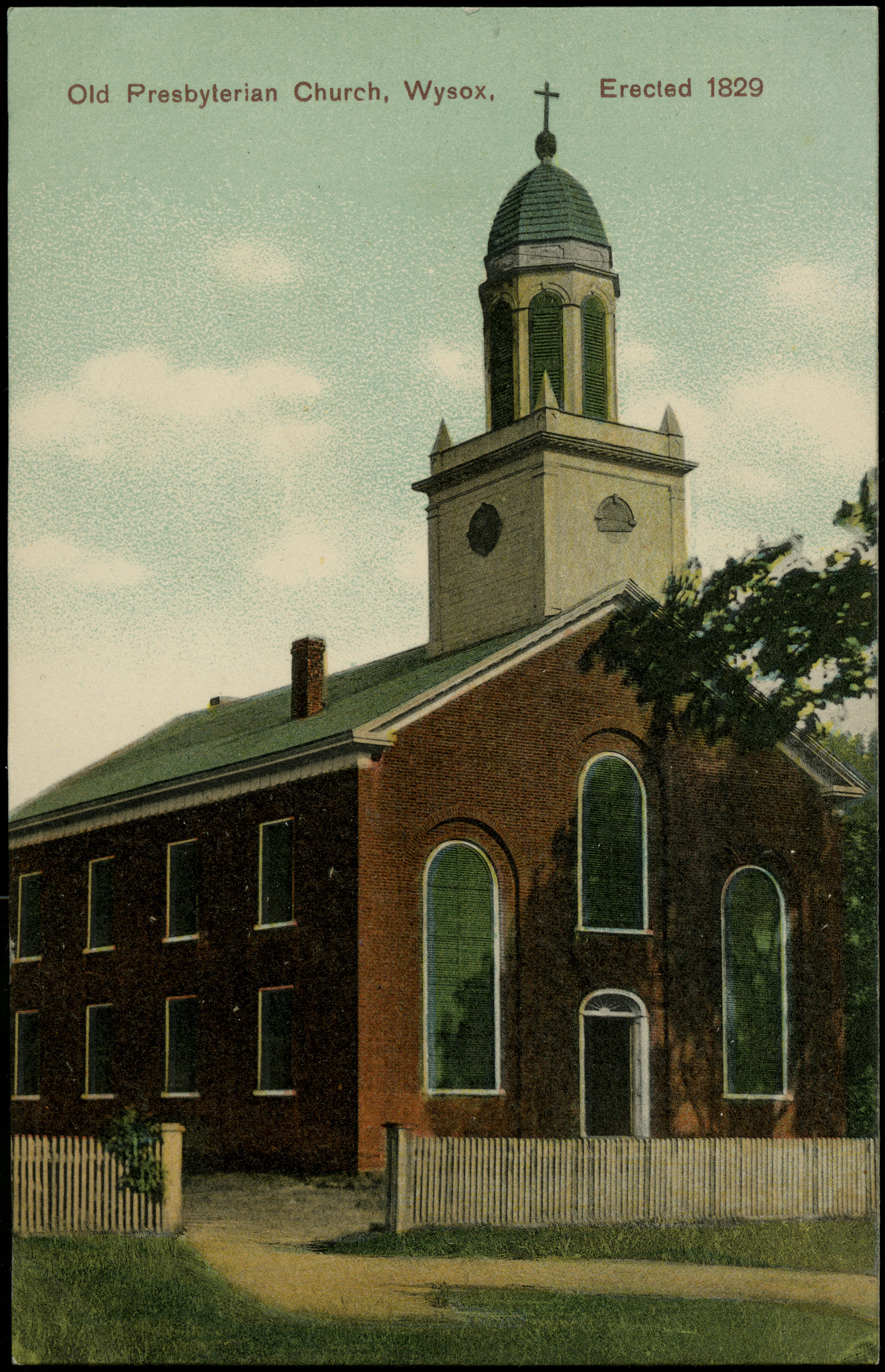
The Presbyterian "Old Brick Church" on an old postcard

== Demographics ==
Historical population
Census	Pop.	Note	%±
2010	1,721		—
2016 (est.)	1,657		−3.7%
U.S. Decennial Census

As of the census of 2000, there were 1,763 people, 710 households, and 506 families residing in the township. The population density was 78.4 inhabitants per square mile (30.3/km^{2}). There were 798 housing units at an average density of 35.5 per square mile (13.7/km^{2}). The racial makeup of the township was 97.22% White, 0.23% African American, 0.68% Native American, 0.57% Asian, 0.45% from other races, and 0.85% from two or more races. Hispanic or Latino of any race were 0.96% of the population.

There were 710 households, out of which 31.0% had children under the age of 18 living with them, 57.0% were married couples living together, 10.7% had a female householder with no husband present, and 28.6% were non-families. 22.0% of all households were made up of individuals, and 7.9% had someone living alone who was 65 years of age or older. The average household size was 2.48 and the average family size was 2.88.

In the township the population was spread out, with 23.8% under the age of 18, 7.1% from 18 to 24, 27.8% from 25 to 44, 24.6% from 45 to 64, and 16.6% who were 65 years of age or older. The median age was 40 years. For every 100 females, there were 105.0 males. For every 100 females age 18 and over, there were 98.7 males.

The median income for a household in the township was $37,100, and the median income for a family was $42,411. Males had a median income of $31,439 versus $20,792 for females. The per capita income for the township was $19,706. About 9.8% of families and 10.8% of the population were below the poverty line, including 19.7% of those under age 18 and 3.1% of those age 65 or over.
