= Windham Township, Bradford County, Pennsylvania =

Township in Pennsylvania, US

Coordinates: 41°57′34″N 76°22′32″W

- Township
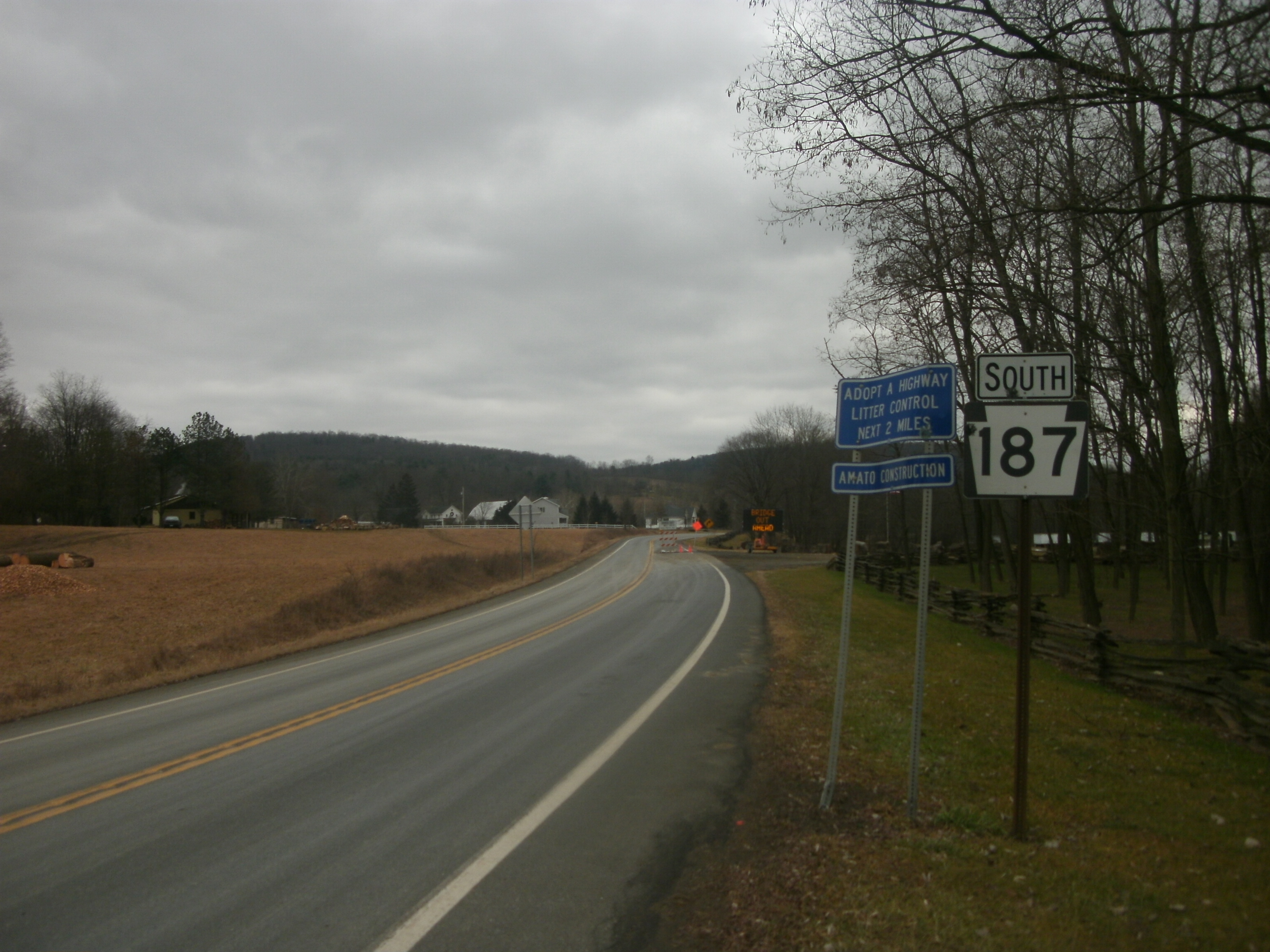
- PA 187 southbound in Windham Township

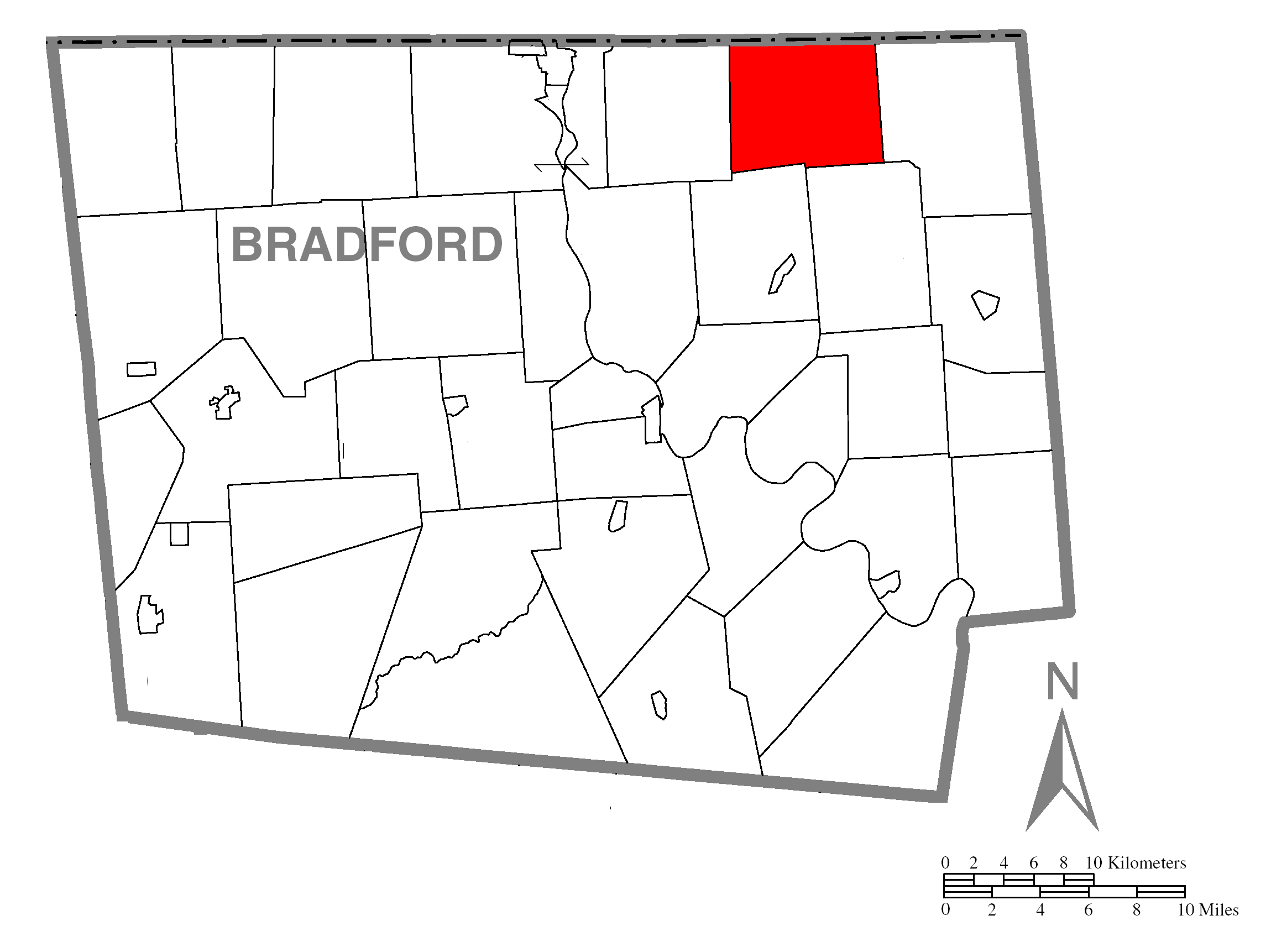
- Map of Bradford County with Windham Township highlighted

- Map of Bradford County, Pennsylvania
- Country: United States
- State: Pennsylvania
- County: Bradford
- Settled: 1800
- Incorporated: 1813

Area
  - Total: 32.29 sq mi (83.62 km^{2})
  - Land: 32.06 sq mi (83.03 km^{2})
  - Water: 0.23 sq mi (0.59 km^{2})

Population (2010)
  - Total: 933
  - Estimate (2016): 916
  - Density: 28.6/sq mi (11.03/km^{2})
- Area code: 570
- FIPS code: 42-015-85672

Windham Township is a township in Bradford County, Pennsylvania, USA. It is part of Northeastern Pennsylvania. The population was 818 at the 2020 census.

== Geography ==
Windham Township is located in northeast Bradford County, along the New York state line. It is bordered by Warren Township to the east, Orwell and Rome townships to the south, and Litchfield Township to the west. To the north, in Tioga County, New York, is the town of Nichols. Windham Township includes the unincorporated communities of Windham, Windham Center, and Windham Summit.

Wappasening Creek flows through the northeast part of the township into New York state, where it joins the Susquehanna River. Pennsylvania Route 187 runs north–south through the township, becoming New York State Route 282 north of the state line.

According to the United States Census Bureau, the township has a total area of 32.3 square miles (83.6 km^{2}), of which 32.0 square miles (83.0 km^{2}) is land and 0.23 square miles (0.6 km^{2}), or 0.71%, is water.

== Demographics ==
Historical population
Census	Pop.	Note	%±
2000	967		—
2010	933		−3.5%
2020	818		−12.3%
U.S. Decennial Census

At the 2020 census, there were 818 people living in 328 households in the township. The population density was 25.5 per square mile (9.8/km^{2}). There were 440 housing units at an average density of 13.7 per square mile (5.3/km^{2}). The racial make-up of the township was 91.07% White, 0.24% African American, 0.24% Native American, 0.48% Asian and 6.48% from two or more races. Hispanic or Latino of any race were 1.95% of the population.

There were 328 households, of which 24.3% had children under the age of 18 living with them, 49.7% were married couples living together, and 24.0% had a female householder with no husband present. 27.7% of all households were made up of individuals, and 13.4% had someone living alone who was 65 years of age or older. The average household size was 2.29 and the average family size was 2.89.

24.2% of the population were under the age of 18, 7.1% from 18 to 24, 27.2% from 25 to 44, 26.8% from 45 to 64 and 14.7% were 65 years of age or older. The median age was 45.5 years.

The median household income was $49,583 and the median family income was $67,083. About 15.0% of the population lived below the poverty line, including 24.6% of those under age 18 and 11.0% of those age 65 or over.
