= Pennsylvania Route 267 =

State highway in Wyoming and Susquehanna counties, Pennsylvania, US

Pennsylvania Route 267

Route information
- Maintained by PennDOT
- Length: 30.780 mi (49.536 km)

Major junctions
- South end: US 6 in Meshoppen
- PA 706 in Rush Township
- North end: NY 26 at the New York state line in Choconut Township

Location
- Country: United States
- State: Pennsylvania
- Counties: Wyoming, Susquehanna

Highway system
- Pennsylvania State Route System; Interstate; US; State; Scenic; Legislative
← PA 266	→ PA 268

Pennsylvania Route 267 (PA 267) is a 30.78-mile-long (49.54 km) state highway located in Wyoming and Susquehanna counties in Pennsylvania. The southern terminus is at US 6 in Meshoppen. The northern terminus is the New York state line in Choconut Township.

== Route description ==
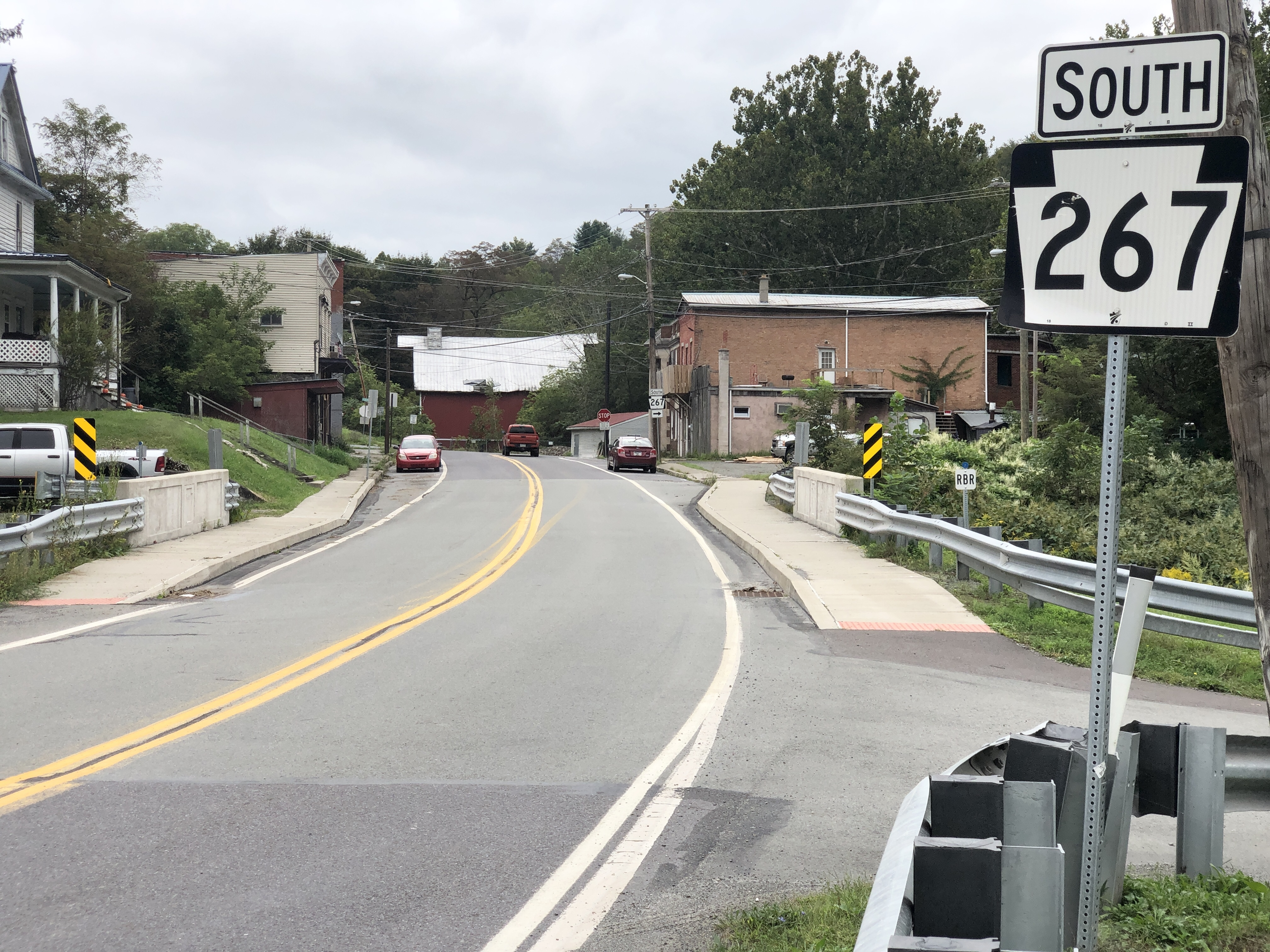
PA 267 southbound just north of US 6 in Meshoppen

PA 267 begins at an intersection with US 6 in the borough of Meshoppen in Wyoming County, heading north on two-lane undivided Bridge Street in a commercial area. The route crosses the Meshoppen Creek, turning west onto Canal Street and curving northwest past a mix of homes and businesses. PA 267 heads north onto Oak Street and leaves Meshoppen for Meshoppen Township, at which point it becomes an unnamed road that runs through dense forests. The road curves northwest before heading to the north again.

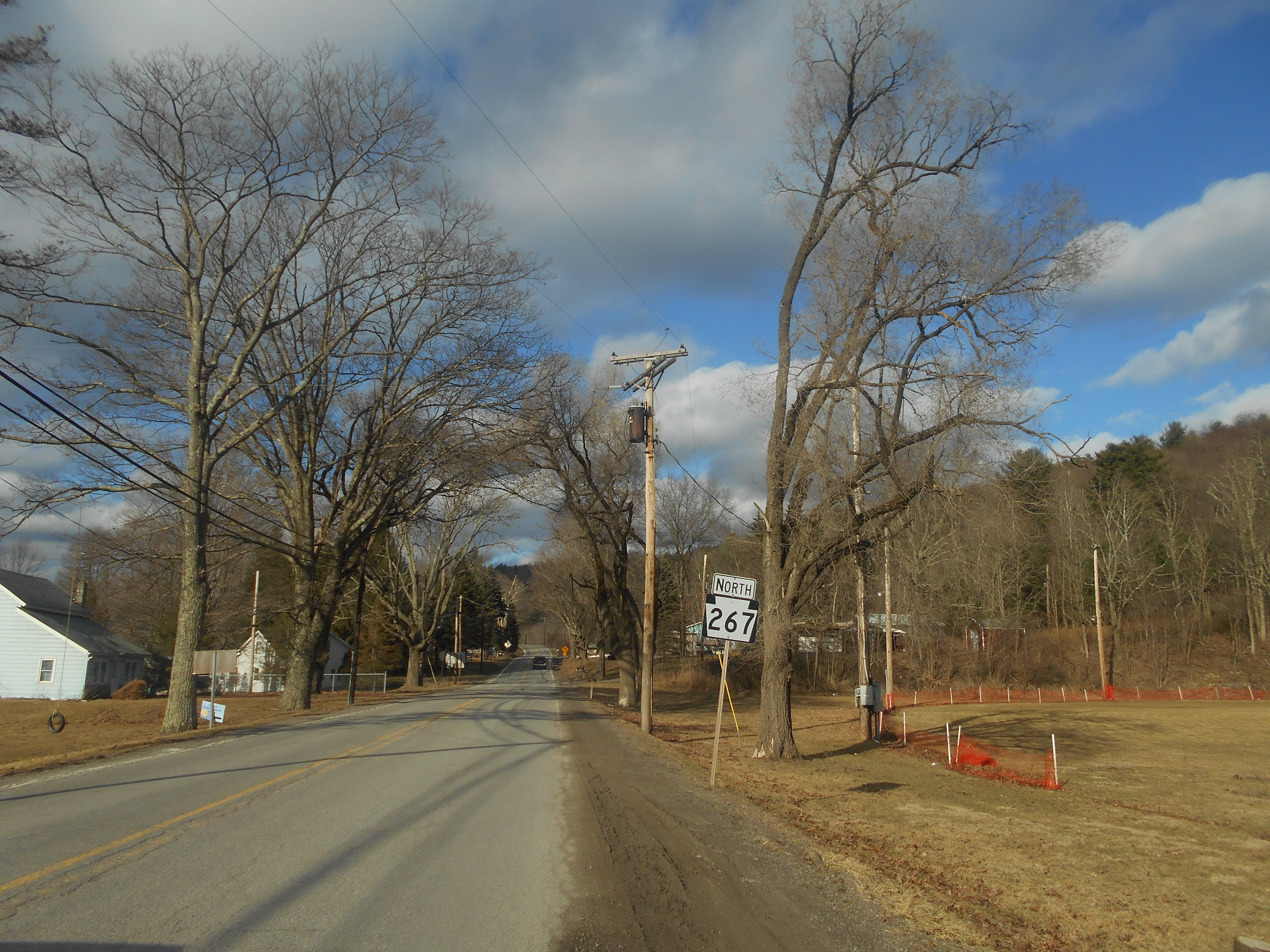
PA 267 northbound in Lawton

PA 267 enters Auburn Township in Susquehanna County and heads through a mix of farmland and woodland with some homes. The road curves to the north-northeast and runs through more rural areas, turning north and passing through Auburn Center. The route runs through more agricultural and wooded areas with some residences, passing through Rushboro before turning northwest and crossing into Susquehanna County. PA 267 heads north-northwest through more forested areas with some fields and homes, coming to an intersection with the northern terminus of PA 367 in Lawton. The road continues northwest and comes to an intersection with PA 706 a short distance later. At this point, PA 267 turns east-southeast for a concurrency with PA 706, crossing the East Branch Wyalusing Creek. PA 267 splits from PA 706 by turning northeast, heading through forests with some fields and homes to the east of the Middle Branch Wyalusing Creek. The road curves to the north and runs through more rural areas, turning northeast and passing through a small corner of Middletown Township before heading into Forest Lake Township. The route passes through Birchardville and curves to the north again as it runs through more forests with some farm fields and residences. The road continues north through more rural areas of forests, entering Choconut Township and turning northeast before heading back to the north. PA 267 heads through more forested areas with some farmland and homes to the east of Choconut Creek, passing through Choconut before coming to the New York border. At this point, the road continues north into that state as NY 26.

== Major intersections ==
County	Location	mi	km	Destinations	Notes
Wyoming	Meshoppen	0.000	0.000	US 6 (Main Street/Roosevelt Highway) – Laceyville, Tunkhannock	Southern terminus
Susquehanna	Rush Township	13.038	20.983	PA 367 south – Laceyville	Northern terminus of PA 367
Susquehanna	Rush Township	13.262	21.343	PA 706 west – Wyalusing	South end of PA 706 overlap
Susquehanna	Rush Township	13.656	21.977	PA 706 east – Montrose	North end of PA 706 overlap
Susquehanna	Choconut Township	30.780	49.536	NY 26 north – Vestal	New York border; northern terminus
1.000 mi = 1.609 km; 1.000 km = 0.621 mi: Concurrency terminus

== PA 267 Truck ==
Pennsylvania Route 267 Truck
- Location: Susquehanna County, Pennsylvania
- Existed: 2013–2016

Pennsylvania Route 267 Truck was a 27-mile-long (43 km) truck route around weight-restricted bridges over the Stone Street Creek and the Middle Branch of the Wyalusing Creek in Susquehanna County, Pennsylvania. It follows the routing of PA 706, PA 29, and Ridge Road. It runs partially concurrent with PA 706 Truck on PA 29 and Ridge Road. It was signed in 2013, but decommissioned after a bridge repair in 2016.
