= Pennsylvania Route 409 =

State highway in Bradford County, Pennsylvania, US

Pennsylvania Route 409

Route information
- Maintained by PennDOT
- Length: 4.012 mi (6.457 km)
- Existed: May 27, 1935–present

Major junctions
- South end: US 6 in Wyalusing Township
- North end: PA 706 in Camptown

Location
- Country: United States
- State: Pennsylvania
- Counties: Bradford

Highway system
- Pennsylvania State Route System; Interstate; US; State; Scenic; Legislative
← PA 408	→ PA 410

Pennsylvania Route 409 (PA 409) is a 4.01-mile-long (6.45 km) state highway located in Bradford County in Pennsylvania. Its southern terminus is at U.S. Route 6 (US 6) in Wyalusing Township, and its northern terminus is at PA 706 in Camptown. It runs through rural areas in eastern Bradford County as a two-lane undivided road. It was designated onto its present alignment on May 27, 1935, running between US 6/US 309 in Limehill and US 106 (now PA 706) in Camptown.

== Route description ==
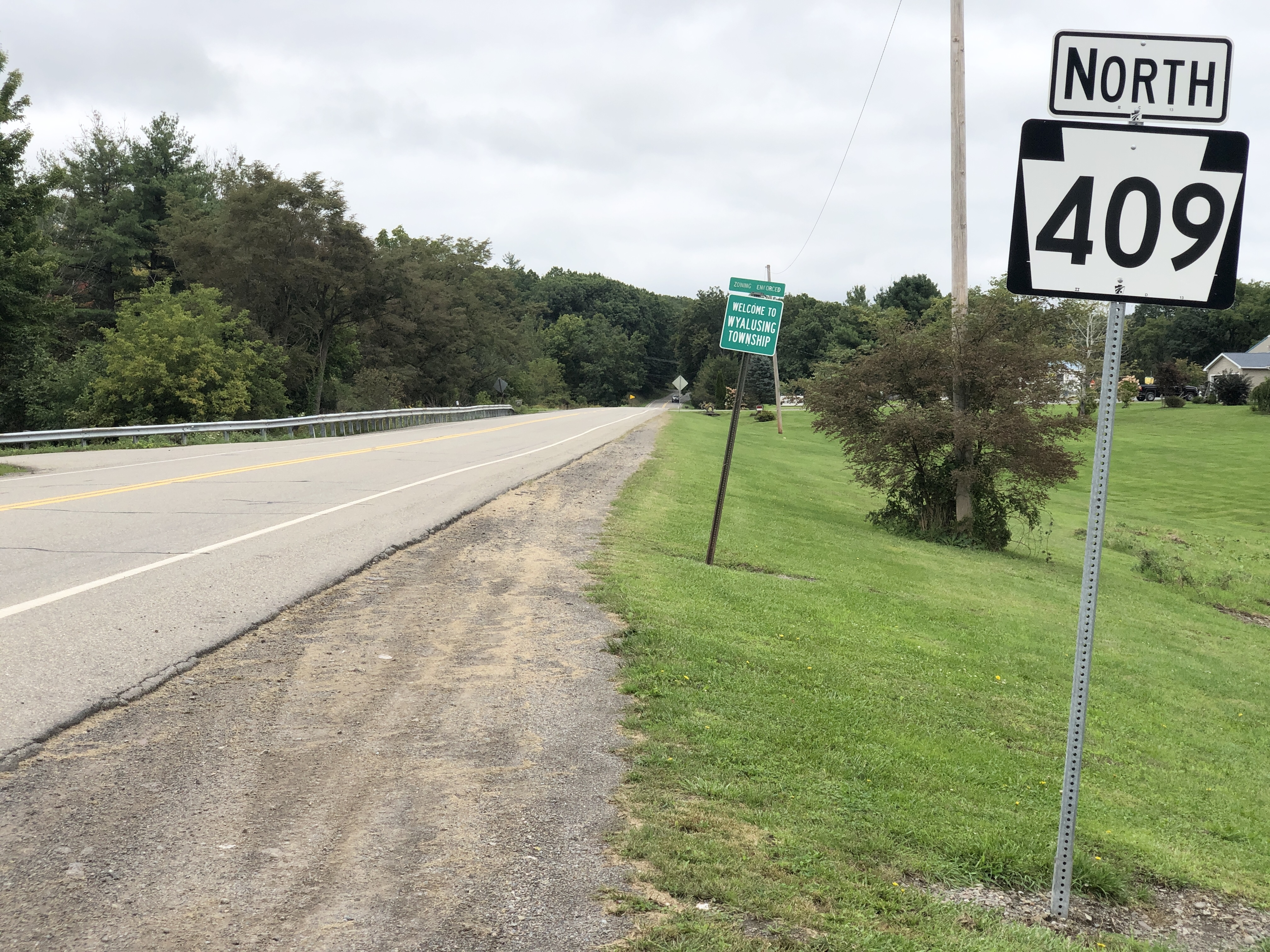
PA 409 northbound at US 6 in Wyalusing Township

PA 409 begins at an intersection with US 6 (the Grand Army of the Republic Highway) in the hamlet of Homets Ferry in Wyalusing Township. The route heads to the northeast, crossing an old alignment of US 6 in the middle of fields before heading into the woodlands nearby, making a gradual curve out along a stagecoach road. The scenery changes from fields back to woodlands until Comiskey Road, where PA 409 turns eastward through fields and passes a lone residence. After intersecting with a dirt road, the highway enters a large patch of forestry, paralleling nearby Billings Creek Road before entering the village of Camptown. In Camptown, PA 409 heads eastward through some residences before intersecting with PA 706 and State Route 1017 (Herrickville Road). This intersection is the northern terminus of PA 409.

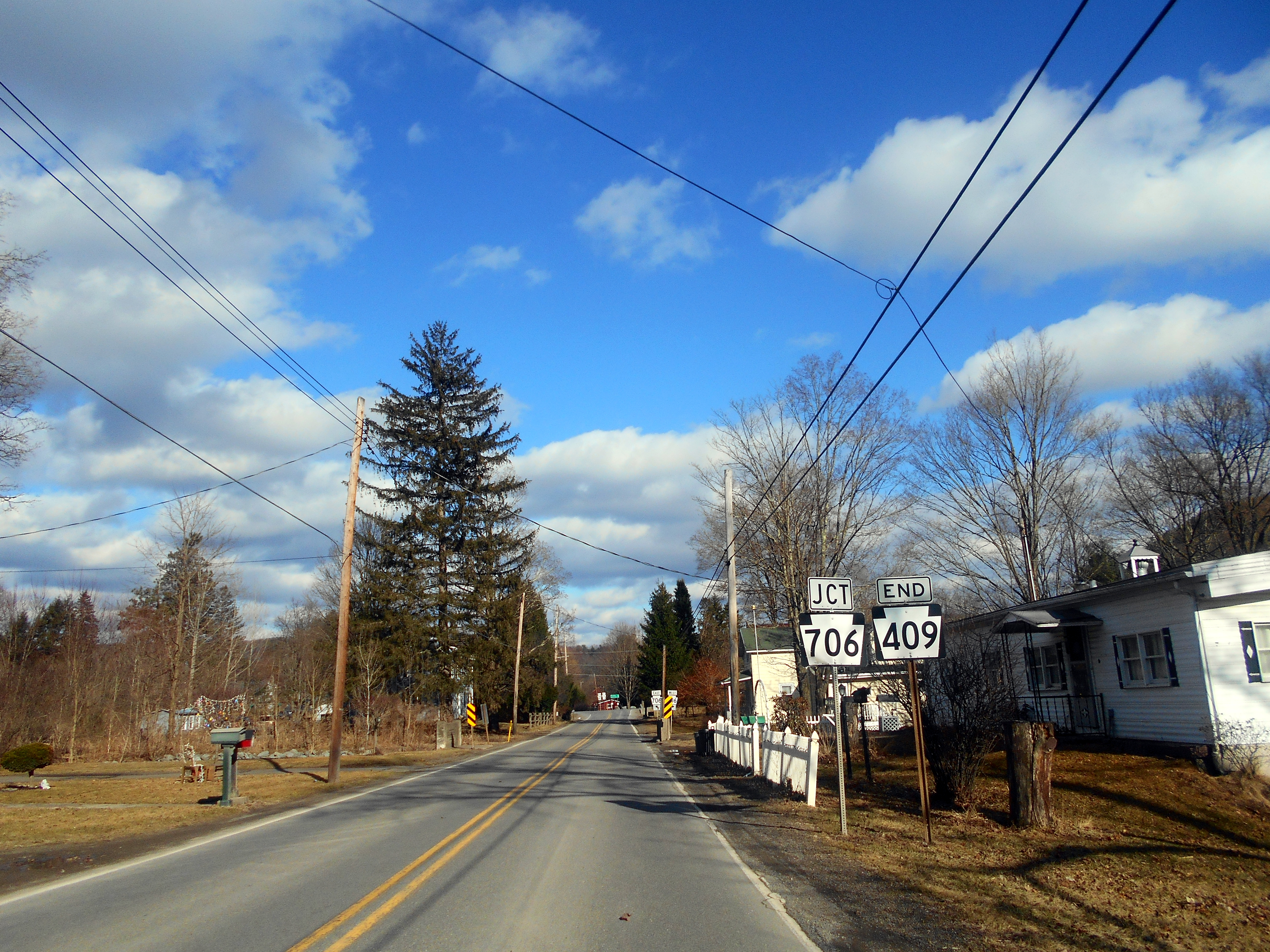
PA 409 approaching the junction with PA 706 in Camptown

== History ==
When Pennsylvania legislated routes in 1911, the present-day PA 409 corridor was designated as part of Legislative Route 14, which ran from Towanda to Montrose. PA 409 was designated on May 27, 1935 to run from US 6/US 309 in Limehill east to US 106 (now PA 706) in Camptown. Upon designation, the entire length of the route was paved. PA 409 has remained on the same alignment since.

== Major intersections ==
The entire route is in Bradford County.

Location	mi	km	Destinations	Notes
Wyalusing Township	0.000	0.000	US 6 (Grand Army of the Republic Highway) – Wyalusing, Towanda	Southern terminus; village of Hornets Ferry
Wyalusing Township	4.012	6.457	PA 706 – Lawton, Wyalusing	Northern terminus; village of Camptown
1.000 mi = 1.609 km; 1.000 km = 0.621 mi
