= Pennsylvania Route 367 =

State highway in Pennsylvania, US

Pennsylvania Route 367
- PA 367 in red and PA 367 Truck in blue

Route information
- Maintained by PennDOT
- Length: 12.527 mi (20.160 km)

Major junctions
- South end: US 6 in Braintrim Township
- North end: PA 267 in Rush Township

Location
- Country: United States
- State: Pennsylvania
- Counties: Wyoming, Bradford, Susquehanna

Highway system
- Pennsylvania State Route System; Interstate; US; State; Scenic; Legislative
← PA 366	→ PA 368

Pennsylvania Route 367 (PA 367, designated by the Pennsylvania Department of Transportation as SR 367) is a 12.53-mile (20.17 km) long state highway located in Wyoming, Bradford, and Susquehanna counties in Pennsylvania. The southern terminus is at U.S. Route 6 (US 6) in Braintrim Township near the borough of Laceyville. The northern terminus is at PA 267 in the hamlet of Lawton, part of Rush Township.

== Route description ==
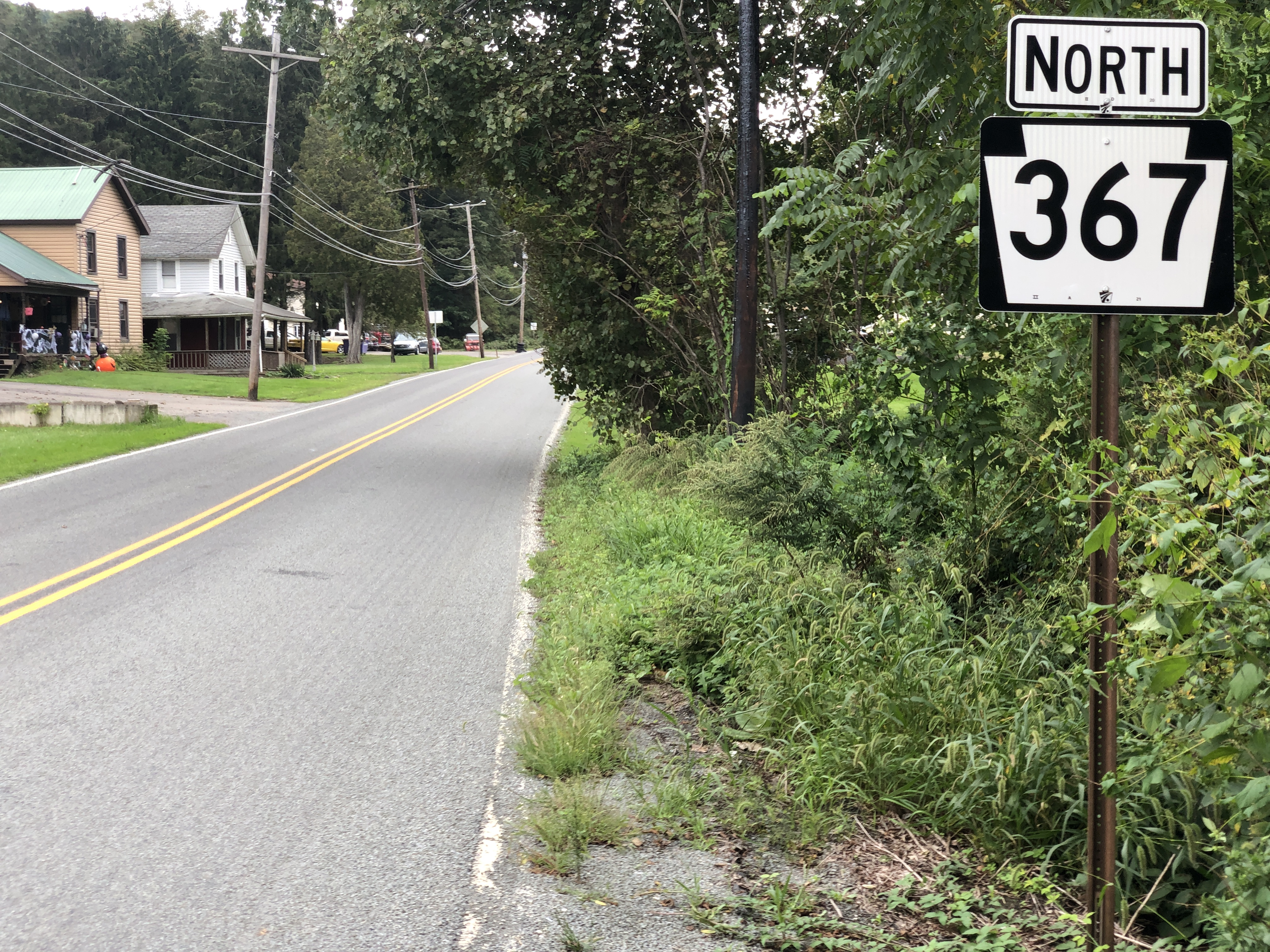
PA 367 northbound just past US 6 Braintrim Township

PA 367 begins at an intersection with US 6 (the Grand Army of the Republic Highway) in the hamlet of Skinners Eddy, just east of Laceyville. The route progresses northeastward as a two-lane undivided road, paralleling Eddy Mountain Road through some houses. After curving further to the northeast, the road becomes predominantly rural and leaves Wyoming County for Bradford County. In Bradford County, PA 367 enters Tuscarora Township. Just after the county line, State Route 1014 (SR 1014) terminates at PA 367. The route remains wooded, weaving its way northward through Tuscarora Township along the side of a pond. After the pond, the highway makes a short beeline to the northwest before turning northward once again. A short distance after the curve, the route curves once again, this time to the northwest and enters the hamlet of Silvara. There, the route forks to the northeast out of the woods intersecting with SR 1002 (Turkey Path Road), SR 1003 (Steam Mill Hollow Road) and SR 1001 (Clapper Hill Road). After SR 1001, PA 367 turns eastward out of Silvara and crosses Coburn Hill into Susquehanna County.

After crossing into Susquehanna County, PA 367 passes to the south of a large pond and intersects with SR 3005, where the main road turns to the north. Paralleling the pond, PA 367 enters Auburn Township and the hamlet of West Auburn. Through Auburn, PA 367 passes some residences and an intersection with SR 3004. At the intersection with Township Road 337 (TR 337), PA 367 leaves West Auburn. PA 367 becomes rural, weaving northward for several miles. At the intersection with Sink Road, the route turns to the northeast. PA 367 passes a large pond and intersects with TR 210. The route returns to its northern progression and intersects with TR 600 and TR 422. There, the route turns northeastward into Rush Township. Through Rush Township, PA 367 changes directions several times and curves one final time to the northeast. Soon, PA 367 enters the hamlet of Lawton, where it intersects with PA 267 and terminates. The road continues as a township road to the intersection with PA 706 nearby.

== Major intersections ==
County	Location	mi	km	Destinations	Notes
Wyoming	Braintrim Township	0.000	0.000	US 6 (Grand Army of the Republic Highway) – Wyalusing, Meshoppen	Hamlet of Skinners Eddy
Bradford	Tuscarora Township			No major junctions	
Susquehanna	Rush Township	12.527	20.160	PA 267 – Rushville, Wyalusing, Meshoppen	Hamlet of Lawton
1.000 mi = 1.609 km; 1.000 km = 0.621 mi

== PA 367 Truck ==
Pennsylvania Route 367 Truck
- Location: Susquehanna County
- Length: 8.3 mi (13.4 km)
- Existed: 2013–present

Pennsylvania Route 367 Truck is a truck route that bypasses a weight restricted bridge over a branch of the Tuscarora Creek, on which trucks over 29 tons and combination loads over 40 tons are prohibited. The route follows PA 267 and SR 3004 through Susquehanna County, Pennsylvania, and it was signed in 2013.
