= Pennsylvania Route 467 =

State highway in Bradford County, Pennsylvania, US

Pennsylvania Route 467

Route information
- Maintained by PennDOT
- Length: 17.056 mi (27.449 km)
- Existed: 1928–present

Major junctions
- West end: PA 187 in Rome Township
- East end: PA 706 in Stevens Township

Location
- Country: United States
- State: Pennsylvania
- Counties: Bradford

Highway system
- Pennsylvania State Route System; Interstate; US; State; Scenic; Legislative
← PA 466	→ PA 468

Pennsylvania Route 467 (PA 467) is a 16.96-mile-long (27.29 km) state highway that is located in Bradford County in Pennsylvania.

The western terminus is situated at PA 187 in Rome Township in the hamlet of Myersburg. The eastern terminus is located at PA 706 in Stevens Township near Stevensville.

== Route description ==
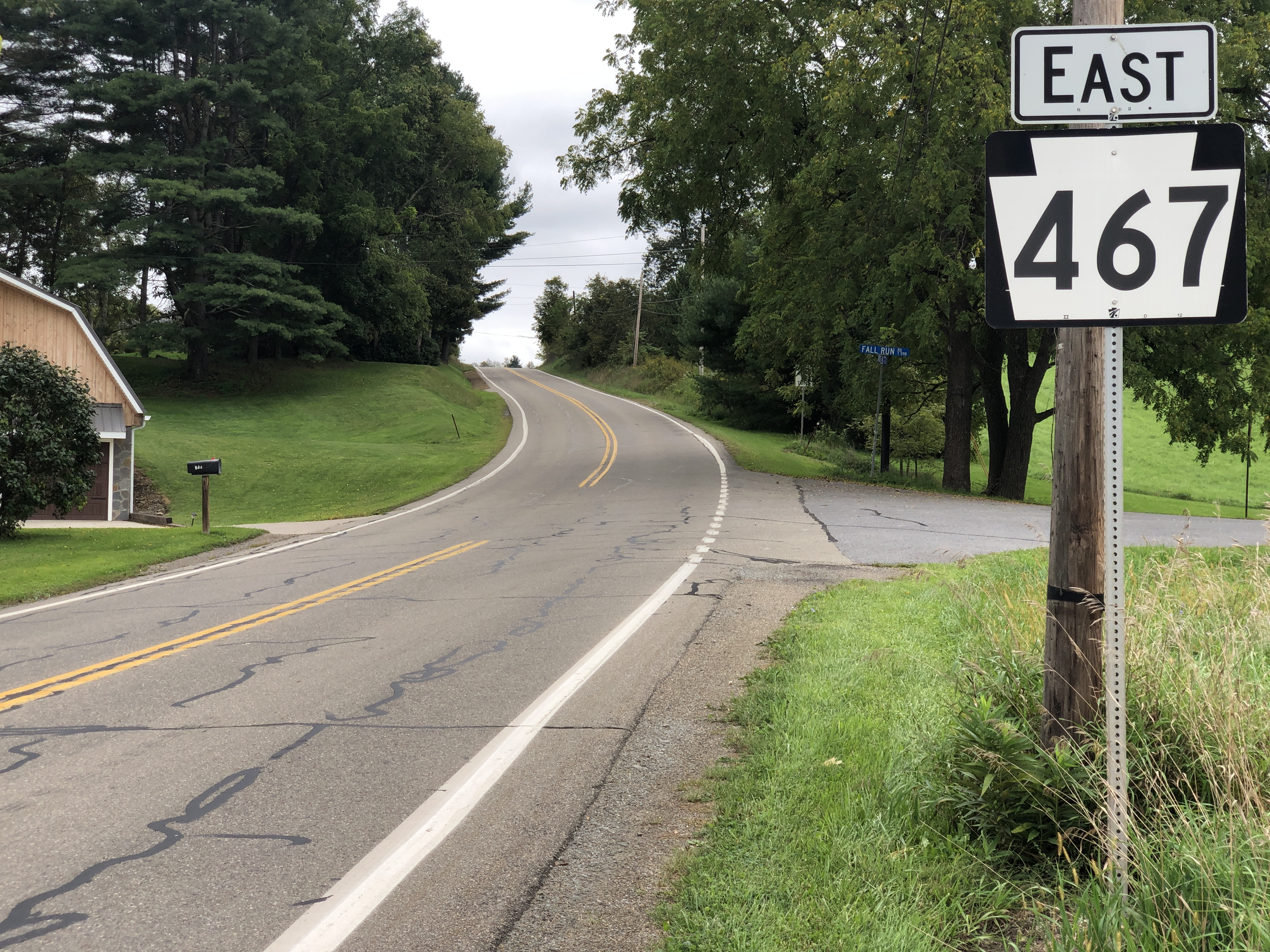
PA 467 eastbound at PA 187 in Rome Township

PA 467 begins at an intersection with PA 187 (Rome Road) in the hamlet of Myersburg in Rome Township. The route progresses eastward on a bridge that was built in 1962 and crosses over Wysox Creek.

This route then passes by a stretch of residences in Rome Township. After the intersections with State Route 1023 (SR 1023, Johnson Hill Road) and Joyce Road, PA 467 turns to the northeast and becomes more rural. After the intersection with Harmony Hill Road, the highway enters the hamlet of Allis Hollow. After the intersection with Ridge Road, PA 467 leaves the small community and makes a southeastern turn into Orwell Township. There, the highway intersects with SR 1010 (Otis Hill Road), where PA 467 bends to the northeast.

In Orwell Township, PA 467 turns eastward after crossing Johnson's Creek. The highway passes numerous residences before turning northeastward into the hamlet of Zion Heights and soon Wells Hollow.

In Wells Hollow, PA 467 remains rural, forking eastward at an intersection with Township Road 781 and SR 1051. PA 467 follows Johnson's Creek eastward until the intersection with Amish Drive, where the route bends to the southeast into Pike Township. The highway remains rural, passing to the west of SR 1049 (Leraysville Road), which soon intersects and merges into PA 467.

Referred to as Warren Road and then Main Street before turning southward and entering the borough of Le Raysville, PA 467 heads southward, intersecting with SR 1026 (East Street) in the center of town. At the intersection with 2nd Street, the highway leaves downtown Le Raysville but continues as Main Street until the intersection with SR 1013 (Davis Road), where it shifts names to Allis Hollow Road. PA 467 turns to the southwest, entering the hamlet of Brushville, where it intersects with the eastern terminus of SR 1010 (now named Allis Hollow Road as well). At that intersection, PA 467 turns to the south then southeast before changing to Le Raysville Road at the intersection with Helly Hill Road.

PA 467 maintains the southeastern progression, crossing through woodlands and fields for several miles and passing to the east of the Leisure Lakes. Paralleling Edwards Road and soon SR 1013, PA 467 enters Stevens Township, curves to the southwest and intersects with PA 706 east of the borough of Stevensville. This serves as the eastern terminus of PA 467.

== Major intersections ==
The entire route is in Bradford County.

Location	mi	km	Destinations	Notes
Rome Township, Bradford County	0.000	0.000	PA 187 (Rome Road) – Rome, Towanda	Western terminus; Hamlet of Myersburg
Stevens Township	17.056	27.449	PA 706 – Lawton, Camptown	Eastern terminus
1.000 mi = 1.609 km; 1.000 km = 0.621 mi

== PA 467 Truck ==
Pennsylvania Route 467 Truck
- Location: Susquehanna County

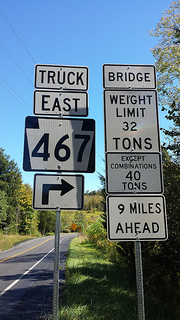
PA 467 Truck signage

Pennsylvania Route 467 Truck (PA 467 Truck) is a truck route that was signed in September 2013 along SR 1010 from Brushville to just east of Le Raysville. It bypasses a small bridge with a 32-ton weight limit (40 tons for combination loads).
