= Wyalusing Creek =

Coordinates: 41°39′40″N 76°16′02″W

Location
- Countries: United States

Wyalusing Creek is a tributary of the Susquehanna River in Susquehanna and Bradford counties, Pennsylvania, in the United States. It is approximately 19.1 miles (30.7 km) long and flows through Rush township in Susquehanna County and Stevens Township, Tuscarora Township, Wyalusing Township, and Wyalusing in Bradford County. The watershed of the creek has an area of 219 square miles (570 km^{2}). It is possible to canoe on a significant portion of the creek.

== Course ==
Wyalusing Creek begins in at the mouths of East Branch Wyalusing Creek and South Branch Wyalusing Creek in Rush Township, Susquehanna County. The creek begins meandering west for a few miles before picking up the tributary North Branch Wyalusing Creek and turning southwest. It almost immediately crosses Pennsylvania Route 706 and soon afterwards, it leaves Rush Township and Susquehanna County.

Upon leaving Susquehanna County, Wyslusing Creek enters Stevens Township, Bradford County. It turns northwest briefly and receives the tributary Ross Creek before turning southwest again. After some distance, it picks up the tributary Rockwell Creek and continues southwest. The creek gradually begins turning west and passes Stevensville. Shortly afterwards, it abruptly turns south and enters Tuscarora Township. It then turns west and reenters Stevens Township for a few hundred feet before bending back into Tuscarora Township. A few tenths of a mile later, the creek leaves Tuscarora Township and enters Wyalusing Township. In this township, the creek turns south-southwest and then turns west, passing the community of Camptown. There, it picks up the tributaries Camps Creek and Billings Creek before turning south and receiving the tributary Patton Creek. The creek continues south for several miles, passing the community of Merryall and crossing Pennsylvania Route 706. It then turns roughly south-southwest and begins to flow parallel to Pennsylvania Route 706. After a few miles, the creek enters the community of Wyalusing. In this community, it crosses U.S. Route 6 and shortly afterwards reaches its confluence with the Susquehanna River.

Wyalusing Creek joins the Susquehanna River 253.02 miles (407.20 km) upstream of its mouth.

== Geography, geology, and climate ==
Upstream of Rush, Wyalusing Creek is braided with logjams and strainers in places. However, there are no deadfalls or fences along it. The creek flows over cobbles. It has riffles and a relatively fast current. It is fairly wide considering its length. The topography of the watershed of the creek is described as "rough and hilly" in a 1921 book. The watershed contains narrow valleys and steep, but rounded hills. It has experienced glacial activity in the past.

The rock in the watershed of Wyalusing Creek consists of shale, sandstone, and deposits of glacial drift. The channel of the creek is sinuous and has steep banks.

There is a stream gauge on Wyalusing Creek at Lawton and another one at Stevensville.

The rate of precipitation in the watershed of Wyalusing Creek ranges between 35 inches (89 cm) and 40 inches (100 cm) per year, on average.

== Watershed ==
The watershed of Wyalusing Creek has an area of 219 square miles (570 km^{2}). The watershed is situated in western Susquehanna County and southeastern Bradford County. It is part of the Upper North Branch Susquehanna drainage basin.

The valley of Wyalusing Creek is narrow and sparsely populated, with pastures.

A lake known as Camp Pond is in the watershed of Wyalusing Creek. Its surface area is 28 acres.

== History and industries ==
Wyalusing is a Native American name purported to mean "home of the old warrior".

The earliest pioneers in the valley of Wyalusing Creek arrived in the late 1700s from New England. A gaging station was established on the creek at Wyalusing in October 1908.

In 1921, the largest communities in the watershed of Wyalusing Creek were Montrose, Wyalusing, Stevensville, Le Raysville, and Camptown. Their populations were 1914, 580, 340, 326, and 300, respectively.

In the early 1900s, the main industries in the watershed of Wyalusing Creek were a foundry, a furniture factory, a planing mill, agriculture, and dairy. As of the late 20th century, the dairy industry remains active in the watershed of Wyalusing Creek. However, few crops are grown in the vicinity of the creek.

In the early 1900s, Wyalusing Creek was used to power gristmills, a roller mill, and a sawmill. It was also used as a water supply for Wyalusing.

== Recreation ==
It is possible to canoe on a significant portion of Wyalusing Creek during snowmelt or within four to seven days of heavy rain. The creek is relatively easy to canoe on, having a difficulty rating of 1. Edward Gertler describes the scenery as "good" in his book Keystone Canoeing.

== See also ==
- List of rivers of Pennsylvania
