= Browntown, Pennsylvania =

Browntown, Pennsylvania may refer to a community in the United States:

- Browntown, Bradford County, Pennsylvania, an unincorporated community
- Browntown, Luzerne County, Pennsylvania, a census-designated place
