= Pennsylvania Route 706 =

State highway in Pennsylvania, US

Pennsylvania Route 706

Route information
- Maintained by PennDOT
- Length: 36.1 mi (58.1 km)
- Existed: March 14, 1972–present

Major junctions
- West end: US 6 in Wyalusing
- PA 409 in Camptown; PA 467 in Stevens Township; PA 858 in Rushville; PA 267 in Rush Township; PA 167 in Montrose; PA 29 in Montrose
- East end: US 11 in New Milford

Location
- Country: United States
- State: Pennsylvania
- Counties: Bradford, Susquehanna

Highway system
- Pennsylvania State Route System; Interstate; US; State; Scenic; Legislative
← PA 702	→ PA 707
← PA 66	→ PA 68

Pennsylvania Route 706 (PA 706) is a 36.1-mile-long (58.1 km) state highway in Pennsylvania. The western terminus is at U.S. Route 6 (US 6) in Wyalusing, and the eastern terminus is at US 11 in New Milford.

== Route description ==
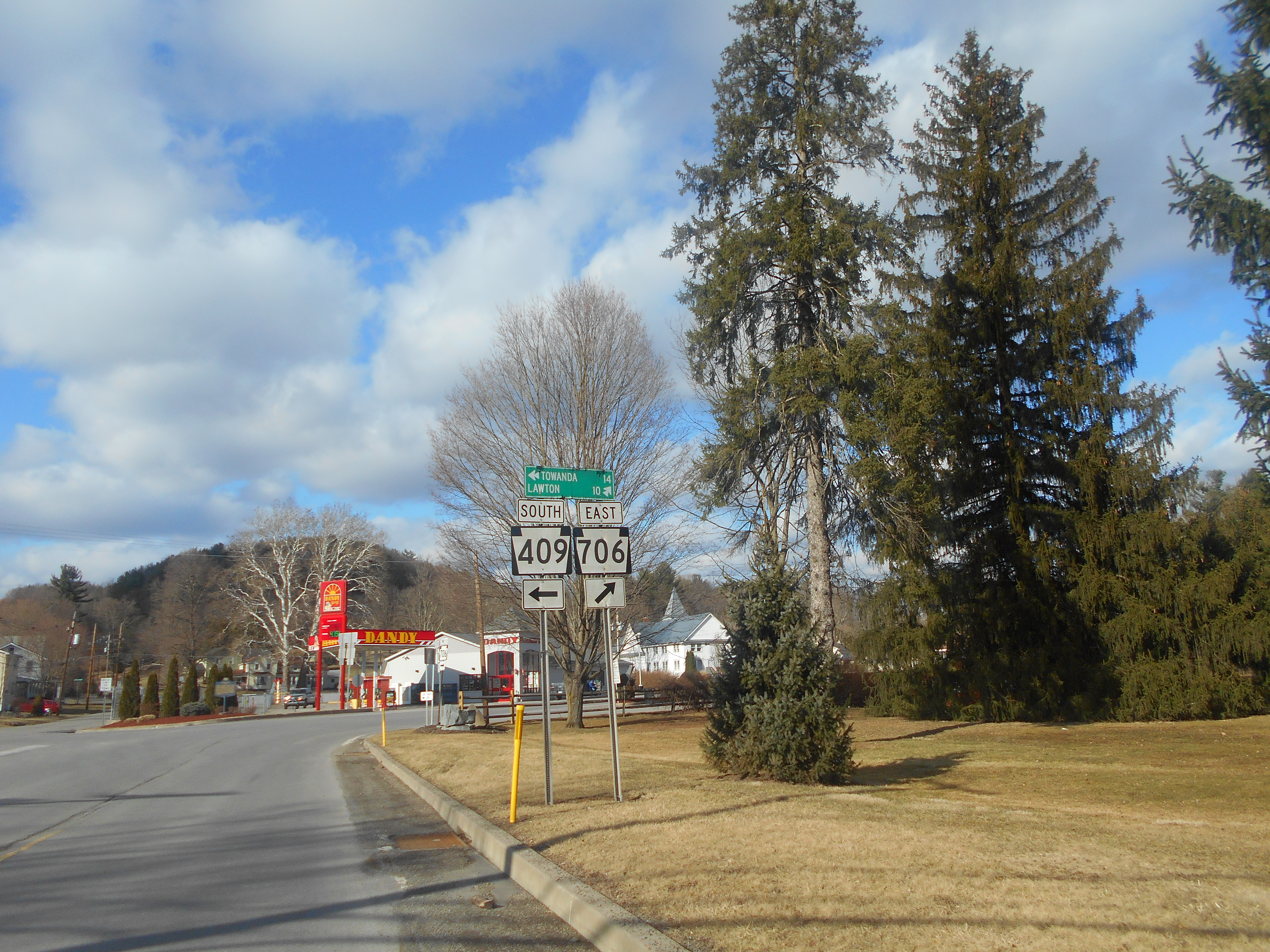
Route 706 at the junction with Route 409 in Camptown

PA 706 begins at an intersection with US 6 in the borough of Wyalusing in Bradford County, heading northeast on two-lane undivided Church Street. The road passes downtown businesses before heading into residential areas, becoming Taylor Avenue. The route turns north into agricultural areas and crosses into Wyalusing Township, becoming an unnamed road and running to the west of Wyalusing Creek. PA 706 turns northeast and passes some industry, heading into more wooded areas with some fields and homes. The road crosses the creek and turns north at Merryall, running through more farmland with some woods and residences to the east of Wyalusing Creek. The route crosses the creek again and heads into the community of Camptown, turning to the northeast at an intersection with the northern terminus of PA 409. PA 706 runs through more agricultural and wooded areas with some homes to the northwest of Wyalusing Creek, crossing into Stevens Township. The road heads through more forested areas with some fields and residences, passing through Stevensville. The route intersects the eastern end of PA 467 and continues through more rural areas, winding to the east.

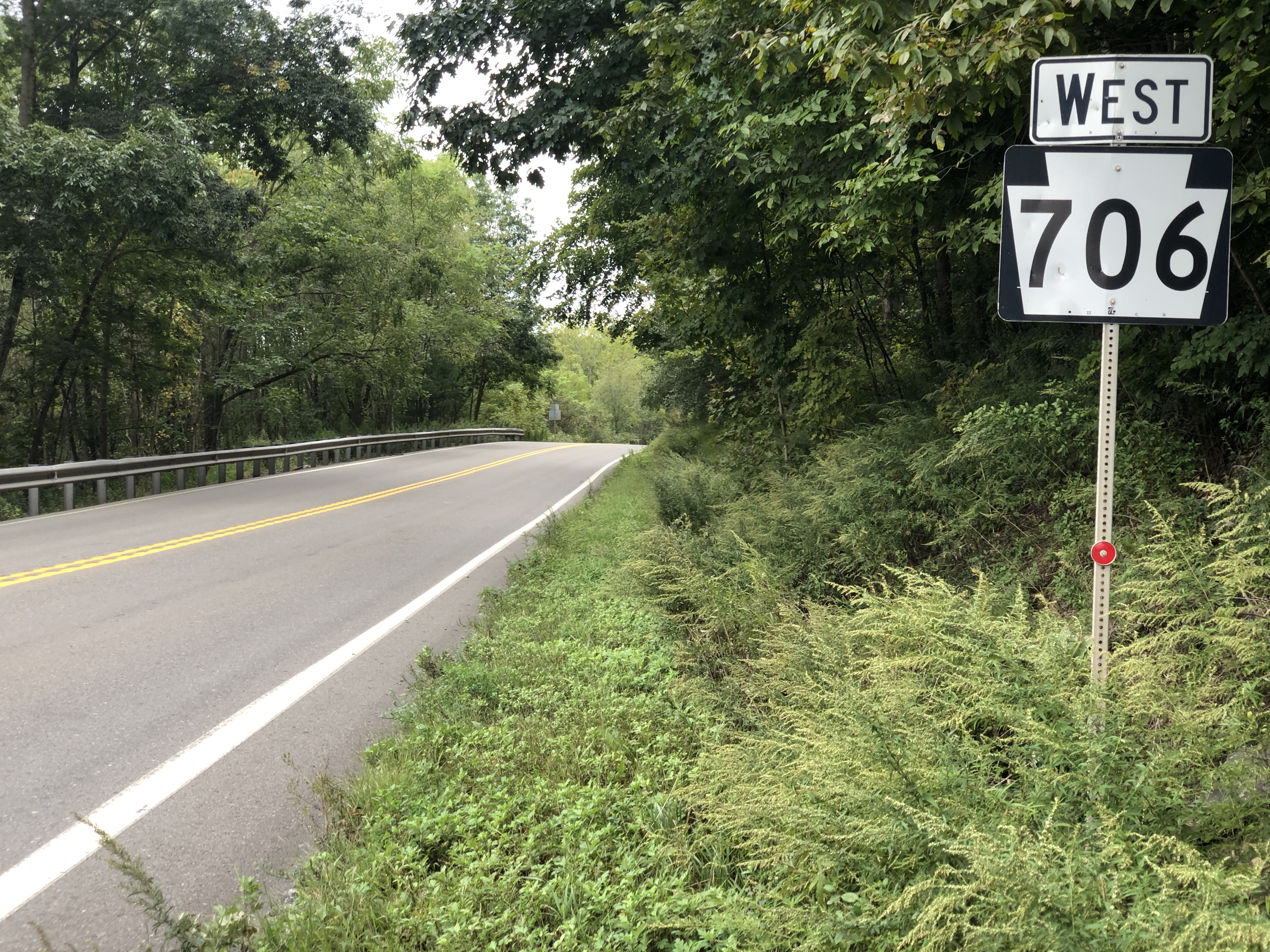
PA 706 westbound at PA 467 in Stevens Township

PA 706 enters Rush Township in Susquehanna County and heads northeast through a mix of farmland and woodland with some residences, passing through Rushville and intersecting the southern terminus of PA 858. The road turns east and crosses the Wyalusing Creek, winding east through more rural areas to the south of the creek. The route comes to an intersection with PA 267, at which point that route turns east to form a concurrency with PA 706, crossing the East Branch Wyalusing Creek and turning southeast. PA 267 splits from PA 706 by turning northeast and PA 706 continues east through more forested areas with some fields and homes to the north of the East Branch Wyalusing Creek, turning northeast and passing through Rush. The road turns east and heads into Jessup Township, passing through more forests before continuing into a mix of farmland and woods with some homes. The route turns northeast at Snows Mill and continues through more rural areas, passing through Fairdale. PA 706 heads more to the east before turning back to the northeast and crossing into Bridgewater Township, winding northeast through more agricultural and wooded areas with occasional residences. The road becomes Wyalusing Street, entering the borough of Montrose and coming to an intersection with PA 167.

At this point, PA 706 forms a concurrency with PA 167, heading into residential areas and curving southeast onto Church Street. The two routes come to an intersection with PA 29 in the commercial downtown of Montrose, with that route joining PA 167/PA 706. The road passes more homes, turning northeast and becoming Grow Avenue. The three routes head into commercial areas and crosses back into Bridgewater Township, becoming an unnamed road. PA 29 splits to the north and PA 167/PA 706 continue east through more developed areas, winding east through woodland with residential and commercial establishments. In Tiffany, PA 167 splits to the southeast and PA 706 heads through more farmland and homes, turning northeast and passing through Heart Lake. The road continues into more wooded areas with some fields and residences, curving north before turning east and heading into New Milford Township. The route curves to the northeast and heads into more forested areas, curving east. PA 706 turns southeast and passes over Norfolk Southern's Sunbury Line before ending at US 11.

== History ==
Parts of the route were once designated Legislative Route 14, PA 67, and US 106 prior to 1972. On March 14, 1972, US 106 was decommissioned; the section of that route between Wyalusing and New Milford then became PA 706. Signs were changed by April of that year.

== Major intersections ==
County	Location	mi	km	Destinations	Notes
Bradford	Wyalusing	0.0	0.0	US 6 (State Street)	Western terminus
Bradford	Wyalusing Township	5.2	8.4	PA 409 south – Towanda	Northern terminus of PA 409
Bradford	Stevens Township	9.9	15.9	PA 467 west (Le Raysville Road) – Le Raysville	Eastern terminus of PA 467
Susquehanna	Rush Township	13.3	21.4	PA 858 north (Pennsylvania Avenue)	Southern terminus of PA 858
Susquehanna	Rush Township	15.8	25.4	PA 267 south – Meshoppen	Western end of PA 267 concurrency
Susquehanna	Rush Township	16.2	26.1	PA 267 north – Vestal	Eastern end of PA 267 concurrency
Susquehanna	Montrose	27.4	44.1	PA 167 north (Owego Street)	Western end of PA 167 concurrency
Susquehanna	Montrose	27.7	44.6	PA 29 south (South Main Street) – Tunkhannock	Western end of PA 29 concurrency
Susquehanna	Montrose	28.8	46.3	PA 29 north – Binghamton	Western end of PA 29 concurrency
Susquehanna	Bridgewater Township	31.0	49.9	PA 167 south (Brooklyn Road) – Hop Bottom	Eastern end of PA 167 concurrency
Susquehanna	New Milford Township	36.1	58.1	US 11 (Lackawanna Trail) – Binghamton, Carbondale, Scranton	Eastern terminus
1.000 mi = 1.609 km; 1.000 km = 0.621 mi: Concurrency terminus

== PA 706 Truck ==
=== Bradford County ===
Pennsylvania Route 706 Truck
- Location: Bradford County
- Existed: 2013–2015

Pennsylvania Route 706 Truck in Bradford County was a truck route that bypassed a weight-restricted bridge on PA 706 over Cold Creek on which trucks over 32 tons and combination loads over 40 tons were prohibited. It was signed in 2013. The bridge was reconstructed in 2015, removing the route.

=== Susquehanna County ===
Pennsylvania Route 706 Truck
- Location: Susquehanna County
- Existed: 2013–2016

Pennsylvania Route 706 Truck in Susquehanna County was a truck route that bypassed a weight-restricted bridge on PA 706 over Pettis Creek on which trucks over 31 tons and combination loads over 40 tons were prohibited. It follows Ridge Road and PA 29 and it runs entirely concurrent with PA 267 Truck. It was signed in 2013. The bridge was reconstructed in 2016, removing the route.
