= Choconut Township, Pennsylvania =

Township in Pennsylvania, United States

- Township
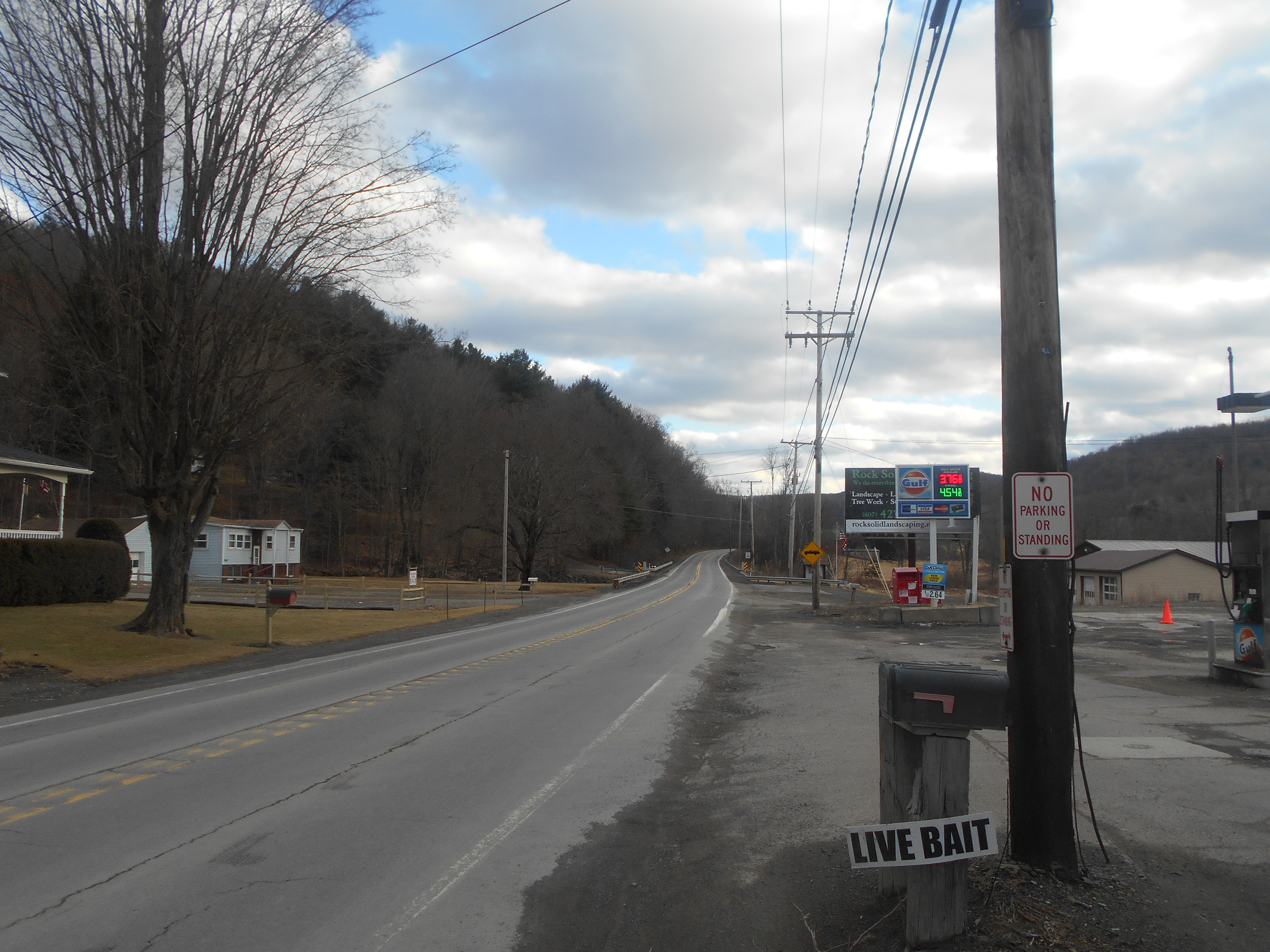
- PA 267 southbound in Choconut

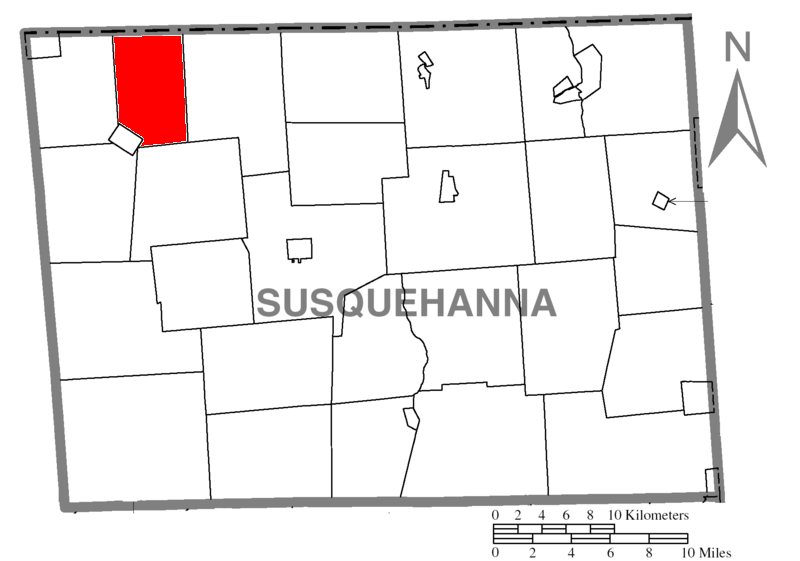

- Location of Pennsylvania in the United States
- Coordinates: 41°57′00″N 75°59′29″W
- Country: United States
- State: Pennsylvania
- County: Susquehanna
- Settled: 1806
- Incorporated: 1813

Area
  - Total: 20.27 sq mi (52.50 km^{2})
  - Land: 20.15 sq mi (52.18 km^{2})
  - Water: 0.12 sq mi (0.32 km^{2})

Population (2020)
  - Total: 684 ▼
  - Estimate (2021): 682
  - Density: 33/sq mi (12.8/km^{2})
- Time zone: UTC-5 (EST)
  - Summer (DST): UTC-4 (EDT)
- Area code: 570
- FIPS code: 42-115-13504
- Website: choconuttwp.com

Choconut Township is a township in Susquehanna County, Pennsylvania, United States. The population was 684 at the 2020 census.

It is named for the native tribe of Choconut, or Ochugnut people, who settled the area prior to European/American settlers.

== Geography ==
According to the United States Census Bureau, the township has a total area of 20.2 square miles (52 km^{2}), of which 20.1 square miles (52 km^{2}) is land and 0.1 square miles (0.26 km^{2}) (0.5%) is water.

== Demographics ==
Historical population
Census	Pop.	Note	%±
2010	713		—
2020	684		−4.1%
2021 (est.)	682		−0.3%
U.S. Decennial Census

As of the census of 2010, there were 713 people, 313 households, and 207 families residing in the township. The population density was 35.5 people per square mile (13.7 people/km^{2}). There were 376 housing units at an average density of 18.7 per square mile (7.2/km^{2}). The racial makeup of the township was 98.6% White, 0.4% African American, 0.1% Native American, 0.4% some other race, and 0.4% from two or more races. Hispanic or Latino of any race were 0.7% of the population.

There were 313 households, out of which 19.5% had children under the age of 18 living with them, 56.5% were married couples living together, 3.2% had a female householder with no husband present, and 33.9% were non-families. 26.8% of all households were made up of individuals, and 7% had someone living alone who was 65 years of age or older. The average household size was 2.27 and the average family size was 2.73.

In the township the population was spread out, with 17% under the age of 18, 60.6% from 18 to 64, and 22.4% who were 65 years of age or older. The median age was 49 years.

The median income for a household in the township was $54,231, and the median income for a family was $72,857. Males had a median income of $48,846 versus $44,750 for females. The per capita income for the township was $29,742. About 1.3% of families and 2.4% of the population were below the poverty line, including 6.6% of those under age 18 and 1.9% of those age 65 or over.
