= Joyce Steele (baseball) =

American baseball player (1935–2019)

- Outfielder / Infielder
- Born: December 25, 1935; Wyalusing, Pennsylvania, U.S.
- Died: April 21, 2019 (aged 83); Lovelton, Pennsylvania, U.S.
- Batted: Switch hitter Threw: Left handed

Teams
- Kalamazoo Lassies (1953)

Career highlights and awards
- Women in Baseball – AAGPBL Permanent Display at Baseball Hall of Fame and Museum (since 1988)

Joyce Maureen Steele (December 25, 1935 – April 21, 2019) was an American utility infielder/outfielder who played in the All-American Girls Professional Baseball League (AAGPBL).

Steele was a member of the Kalamazoo Lassies club during its 1953 season, while playing briefly at first base and outfield. Unfortunately, there are no statistics available from her season because the league stopped recording individual achievements after 1948, so individual accomplishments are complete only through 1949.

Steele is part of the AAGPBL permanent display at the Baseball Hall of Fame and Museum in Cooperstown, New York, opened in 1988, which is dedicated to the entire league rather than any individual figure.
