= Pennsylvania Route 858 =

State highway in Susquehanna County, Pennsylvania, US

Pennsylvania Route 858

Route information
- Maintained by PennDOT
- Length: 16.465 mi (26.498 km)
- Existed: 1928–present

Major junctions
- South end: PA 706 in Rush Township
- North end: CR 41 at New York state line in Little Meadows

Location
- Country: United States
- State: Pennsylvania
- Counties: Susquehanna

Highway system
- Pennsylvania State Route System; Interstate; US; State; Scenic; Legislative
← PA 857	→ PA 859

Pennsylvania Route 858 (PA 858, designated by the Pennsylvania Department of Transportation as SR 0858) is a 16.465-mile-long (26.498 km) state highway located in Susquehanna County in Pennsylvania. The southern terminus is at PA 706 in Rush Township. The northern terminus is the New York state line in Little Meadows. The route from there continues into Tioga County as County Route 41 (CR 41). The route was assigned in 1928, completed a year later, and has remained the same since, with an exception of its southern terminus changing designations from PA 67.

== Route description ==
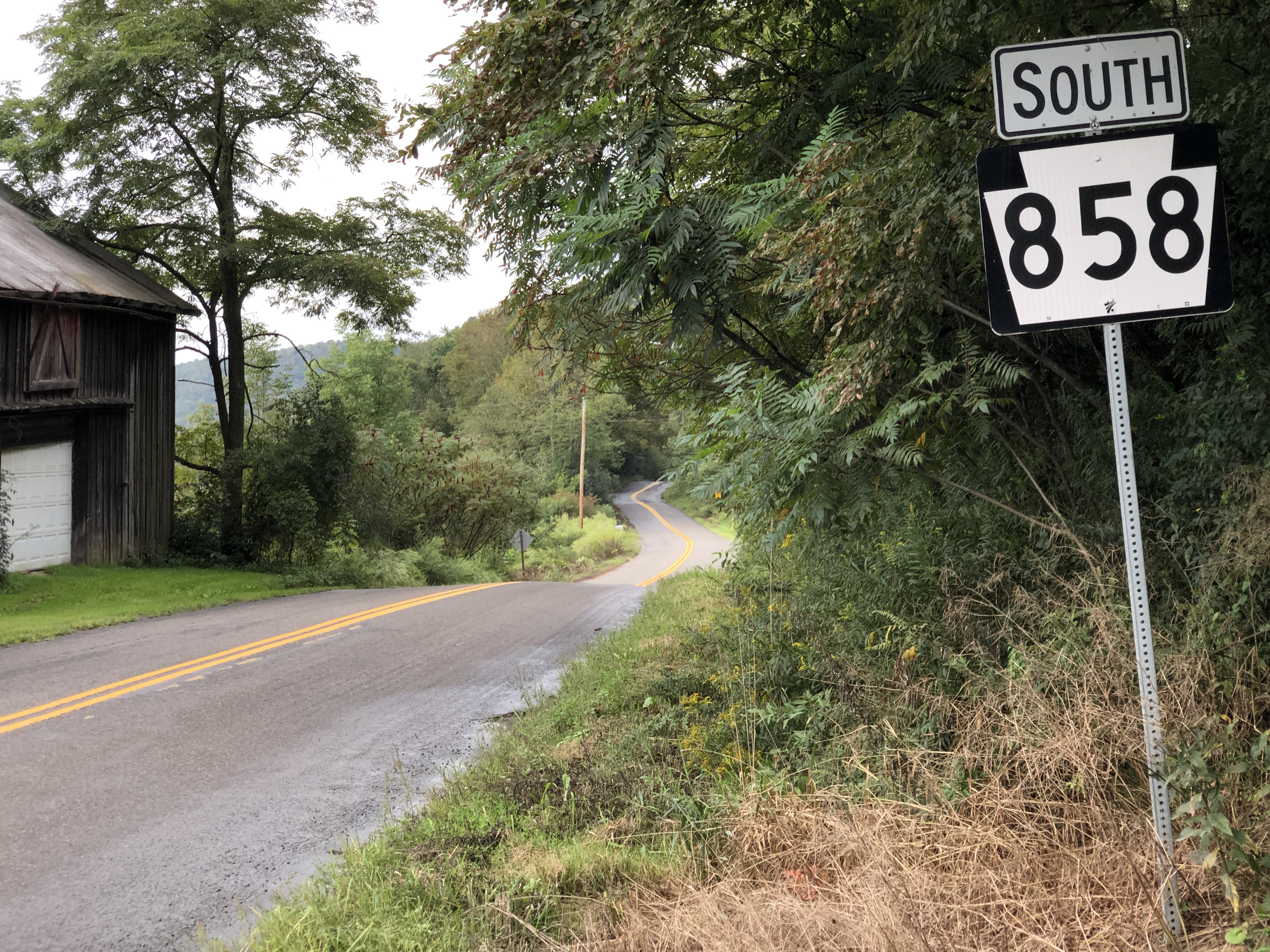
PA 858 southbound in Middletown Center

PA 858 begins at an intersection with PA 706 in the Rush Township community of Rushville. The highway begins its long trek in Susquehanna County by progressing northward in a patch of forests. PA 858, which runs west of a creek, is sparsely populated and homes are rare. PA 858 winds its way in and out of forests, heading on a northeast direction. Soon after, there is an intersection with Keefs Hill Road, a locally maintained highway. After Keefs Hill Road, PA 858 heads back into a dense patch of trees. In the forest, is an intersection with C. Warner Road, and soon after comes one for Shadduck Road.

Although the dense forest ends, trees continue to surround the highway. The route turns a short drift off its alignment at an intersection with Miller Road. The route turns from the northward direction it was heading to a northwestern direction and intersects eventually with Guilton Road. The dense forestry returns, and PA 858 begins winding its way along. Residential homes have all but disappeared from the route, with trees showing the way into Middletown Center. PA 858 passes a pond to the east, intersecting with the former alignment of PA 859, now a locally maintained highway known as Vet Davis Road and Camp Corby Road.

After leaving Middletown Center, PA 858 continues northward and sometimes northeastward. After Middletown Center, PA 858 is surrounded by nothing but trees. There is a break in the trees when PA 858 intersects with an unnamed road, which serves as a connector to Township Road 768 (TR 768). The state traffic route continues to the northwest, intersecting with TR 687. As PA 858 continues, it enters Apolacon Township, where the dense forestry begins to break, and homes begin to show the way. After a short pond is passed, the highway enters the borough of Little Meadows. At Maple Avenue, PA 858 runs on its final stretch, passing homes all the way to the New York state line. There, PA 858 ends and becomes CR 41 upon entering Tioga County, New York.

== History ==
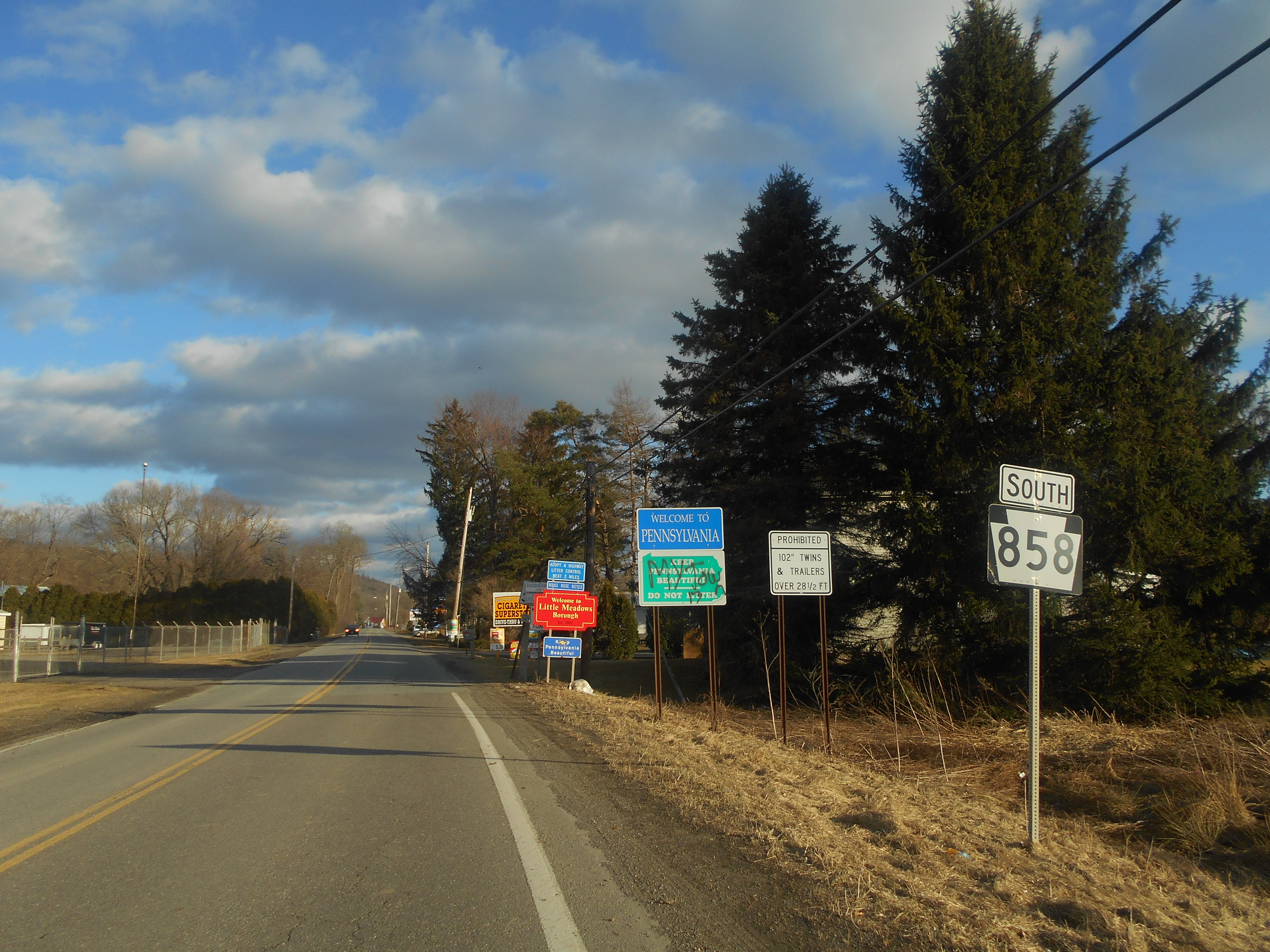
PA 858 southbound at the state line in Little Meadows

PA 858 was first assigned in the mass numbering of state traffic routes in Pennsylvania in 1928. However, the southern terminus of the highway was not an intersection with PA 706. Instead, it was an intersection with PA 67. When it was assigned, it only ran from U.S. Route 106 to Town House Road, since the rest had not been completed yet. The final, already paved segment of PA 858 was completed by the next year. In 1932, the route south of Town House Road was paved. In 1972, PA 67 was decommissioned, and the route at the southern terminus became PA 706.

== Major intersections ==
The entire route is in Susquehanna County.

Location	mi	km	Destinations	Notes
Rush Township	0.000	0.000	PA 706	Southern terminus
Little Meadows	16.465	26.498	CR 41 (Pennsylvania Avenue)	New York state line; northern terminus
1.000 mi = 1.609 km; 1.000 km = 0.621 mi
