= Ellen and Charles F. Welles House =

Historic house in Pennsylvania, United States

- U.S. National Register of Historic Places
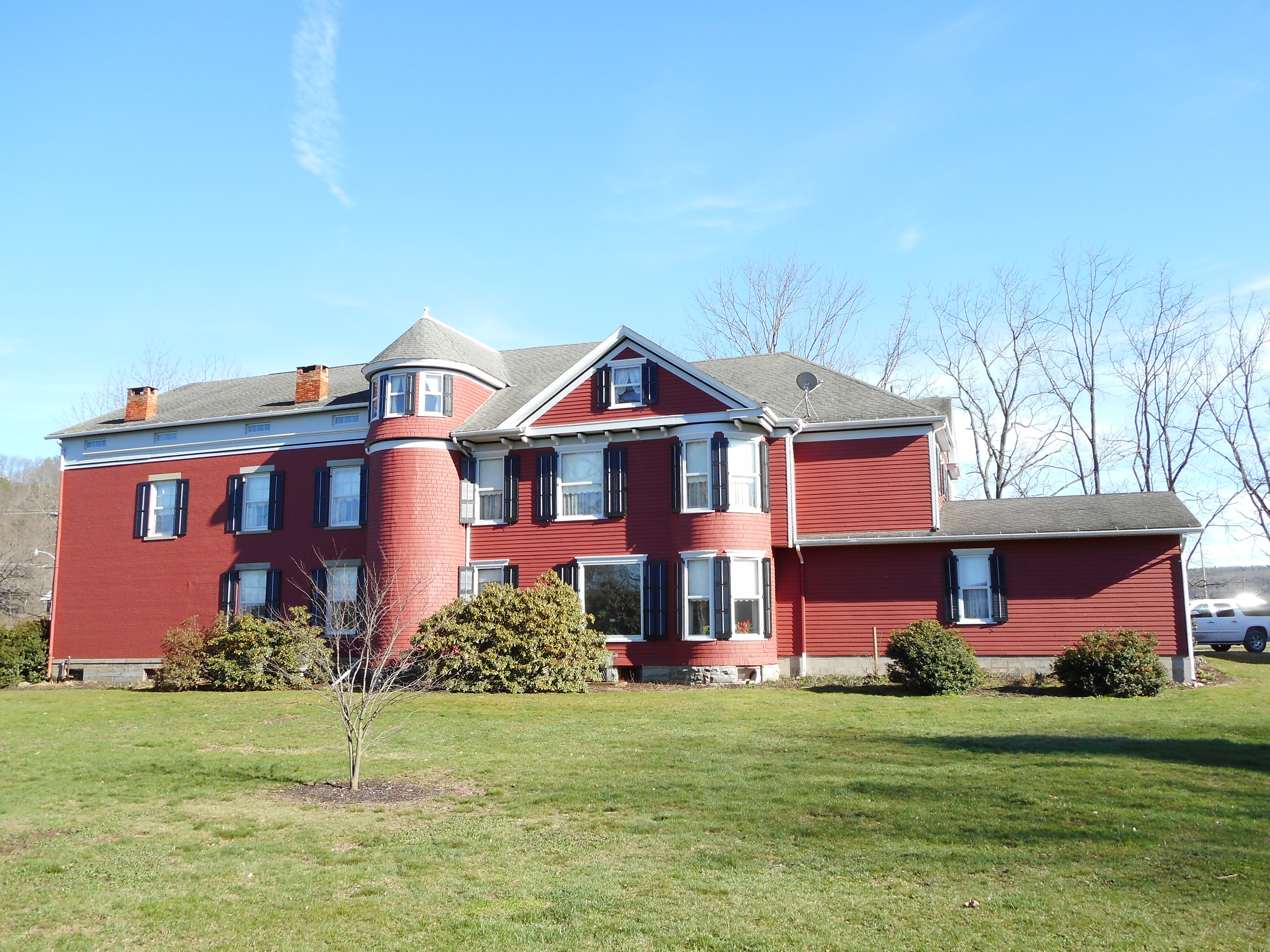

- Location within Pennsylvania Location within the United States
- Location: 1 Grovedale Ln., Wyalusing Township, Pennsylvania
- Coordinates: 41°39′38″N 76°15′27″W
- Area: 108.7 acres (44.0 ha)
- Built: 1822, 1894
- Architect: J.Q. Ingham
- Architectural style: Greek Revival, Queen Anne
- NRHP reference No.: 99000608, 03001156
- Added to NRHP: May 20, 1999, November 15, 2003 (Boundary Increase)

Ellen and Charles F. Welles House, also known as "The Old Red House," "Grovedale Farm," and Homer P. Dean Funeral Home, is a historic home located in Wyalusing Township, Bradford County, Pennsylvania. The original house was built about 1822, and is a transitional brick Greek Revival-style dwelling. A 2 1/2-story frame Queen Anne-style addition built in 1894. Also on the property are a small frame barn (c. 1870), a large frame barn and carriage barn (c. 1850), corn crib (c. 1900), and small frame tenant house (c. 1890).

It was added to the National Register of Historic Places in 1999, with a boundary increase in 2003.
