= Stevens Township, Pennsylvania =

Township in Pennsylvania, US

Coordinates: 41°44′59″N 76°09′59″W

- Township
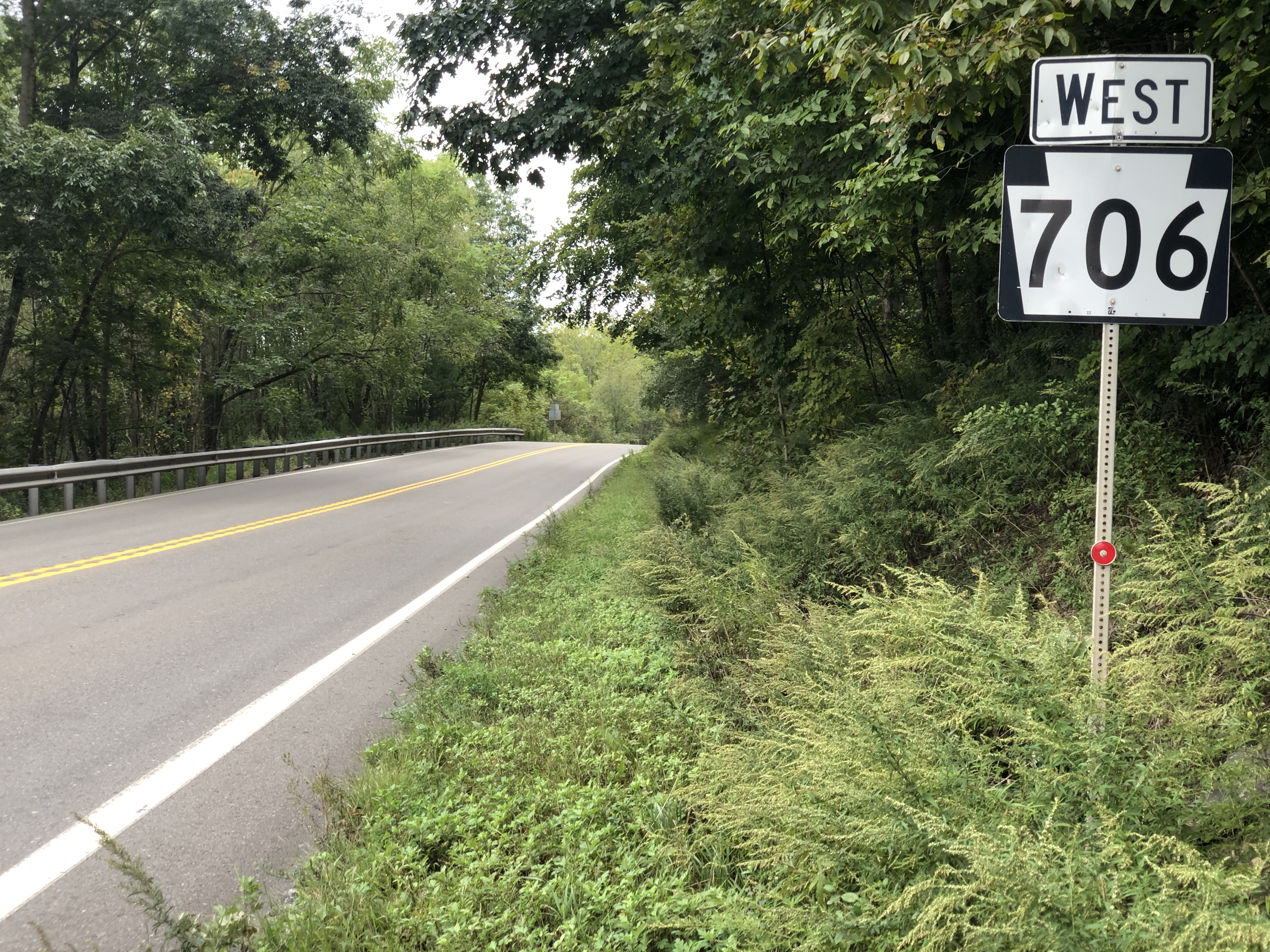
- PA 706 in Stevens Township

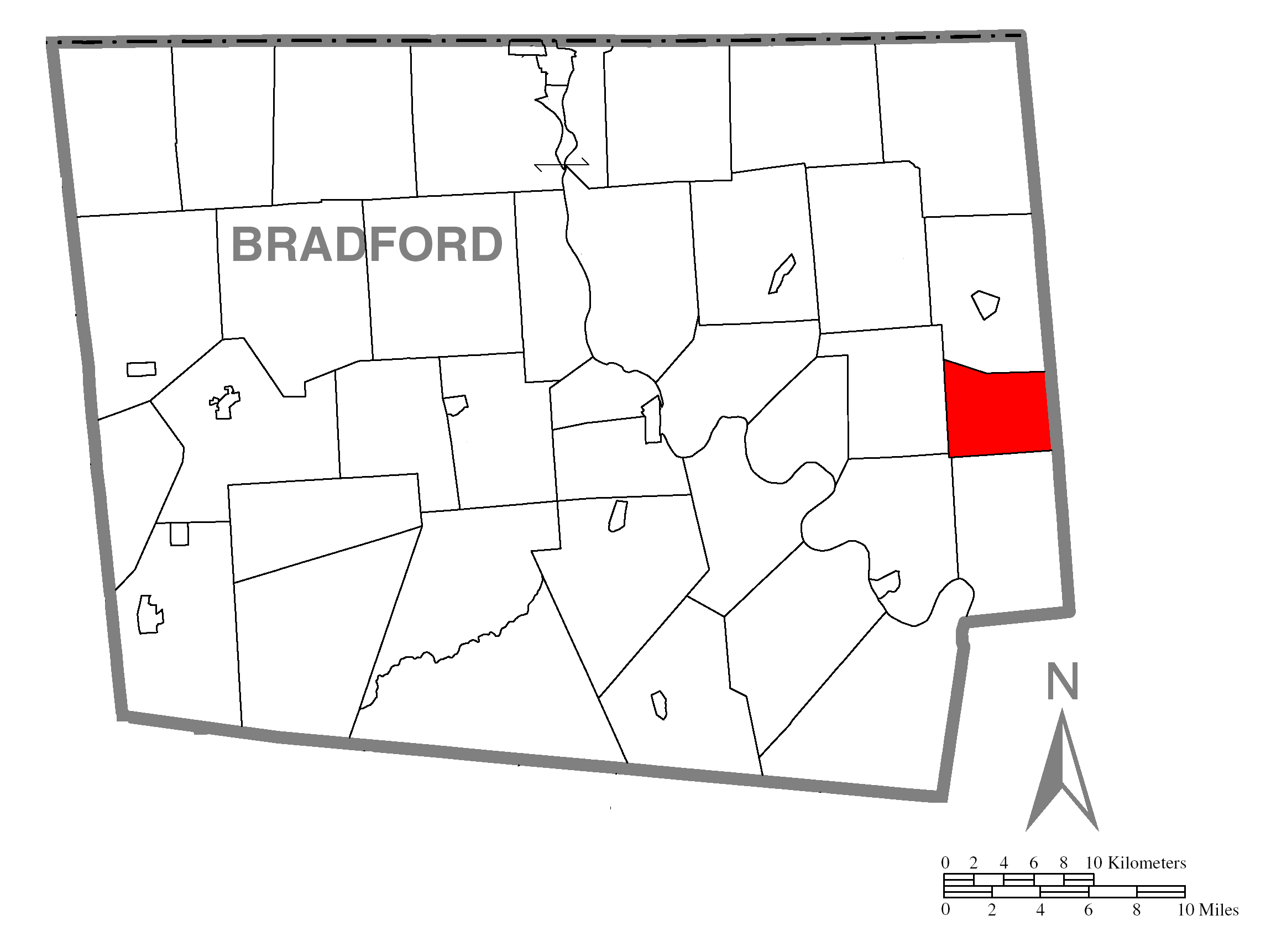
- Map of Bradford County with Stevens Township highlighted

- Map of Bradford County, Pennsylvania
- Country: United States
- State: Pennsylvania
- County: Bradford
- Settled: 1790
- Incorporated: 1926

Area
  - Total: 15.70 sq mi (40.66 km^{2})
  - Land: 15.52 sq mi (40.20 km^{2})
  - Water: 0.18 sq mi (0.46 km^{2})

Population (2010)
  - Total: 437
  - Estimate (2016): 432
  - Density: 27.8/sq mi (10.75/km^{2})
- Area code: 570
- FIPS code: 42-015-74032

Stevens Township is a township in Bradford County, Pennsylvania, United States. The population was 437 at the 2010 census.

== Geography ==
Stevens Township is located in eastern Bradford County and is bordered by Tuscarora Township to the south, Wyalusing Township to the southwest, Herrick Township to the west, and Pike Township to the north. Rush Township in Susquehanna County is to the east.

Pennsylvania Route 706 passes through the township from the southwest corner to the eastern border, following the valley of Wyalusing Creek, a tributary of the Susquehanna River. Pennsylvania Route 467 departs north from Route 706 just east of the unincorporated community of Stevensville.

According to the United States Census Bureau, the township has a total area of 15.7 square miles (40.7 km^{2}), of which 15.5 square miles (40.2 km^{2}) is land and 0.19 square miles (0.5 km^{2}), or 1.12%, is water.

== Demographics ==
Historical population
Census	Pop.	Note	%±
2010	437		—
2016 (est.)	432		−1.1%
U.S. Decennial Census

As of the census of 2000, there were 414 people, 165 households, and 114 families residing in the township. The population density was 26.8 inhabitants per square mile (10.3/km^{2}). There were 225 housing units at an average density of 14.6/sq mi (5.6/km^{2}). The racial makeup of the township was 95.41% White, 0.72% African American, 1.69% Native American, 0.24% Asian, and 1.93% from two or more races. Hispanic or Latino of any race were 0.48% of the population.

There were 165 households, out of which 26.7% had children under the age of 18 living with them, 57.6% were married couples living together, 6.1% had a female householder with no husband present, and 30.9% were non-families. 26.1% of all households were made up of individuals, and 12.1% had someone living alone who was 65 years of age or older. The average household size was 2.51 and the average family size was 3.02.

In the township the population was spread out, with 21.7% under the age of 18, 7.5% from 18 to 24, 22.9% from 25 to 44, 29.7% from 45 to 64, and 18.1% who were 65 years of age or older. The median age was 43 years. For every 100 females, there were 106.0 males. For every 100 females age 18 and over, there were 101.2 males.

The median income for a household in the township was $33,000, and the median income for a family was $36,750. Males had a median income of $33,750 versus $20,278 for females. The per capita income for the township was $15,983. About 12.8% of families and 17.4% of the population were below the poverty line, including 15.1% of those under age 18 and 14.1% of those age 65 or over.

== Notable person ==
- William T. Grant, retailer and philanthropist
