= Lawton, Pennsylvania =

Unincorporated community in Pennsylvania, US

- Unincorporated community
- Location within Pennsylvania
- Coordinates: 41°47′09″N 76°04′15″W
- Country: United States
- State: Pennsylvania
- County: Susquehanna
- Elevation: 935 ft (285 m)
- Time zone: UTC-5 (Eastern (EST))
  - Summer (DST): UTC-4 (EDT)
- ZIP code: 18828
- Area codes: 272 & 570
- GNIS feature ID: 1203995

Lawton is an unincorporated community in Susquehanna County, Pennsylvania, United States. The community is located along Pennsylvania Route 267, Pennsylvania Route 367, and Pennsylvania Route 706, 10.5 miles (16.9 km) west-southwest of Montrose. Lawton has a post office with ZIP code 18828.
