= Apolacon Township, Pennsylvania =

Township in Pennsylvania, United States

Apolacon Township
- Township
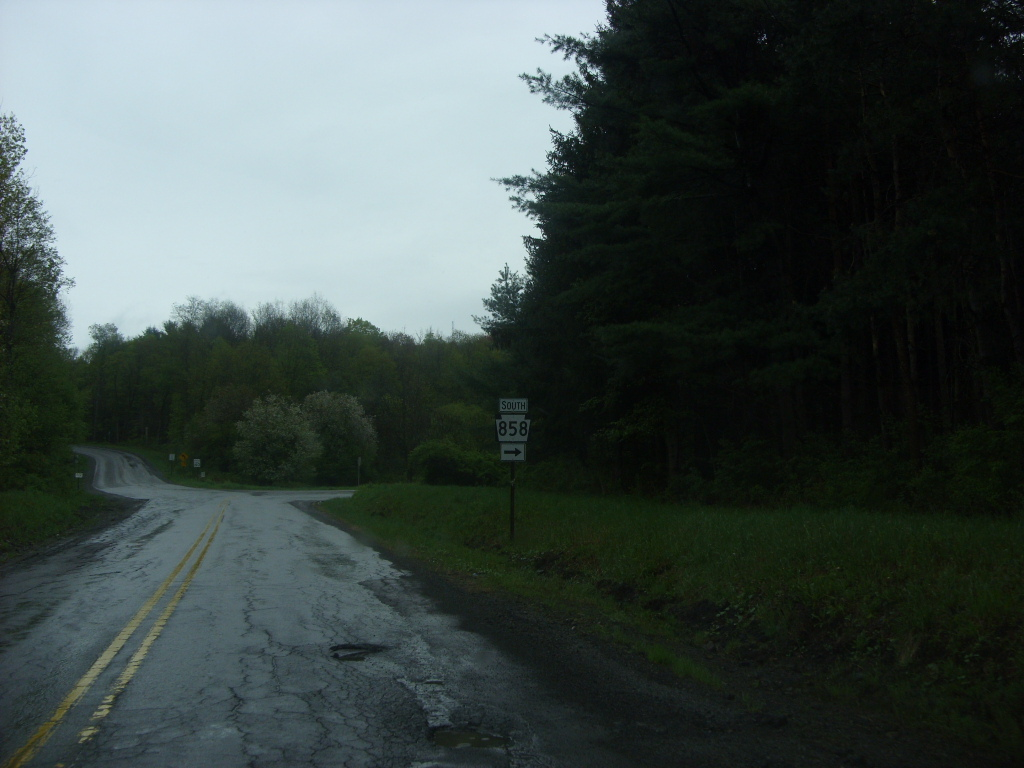
- PA 858 southbound through State Game Lands No. 140 in Apolacon Township

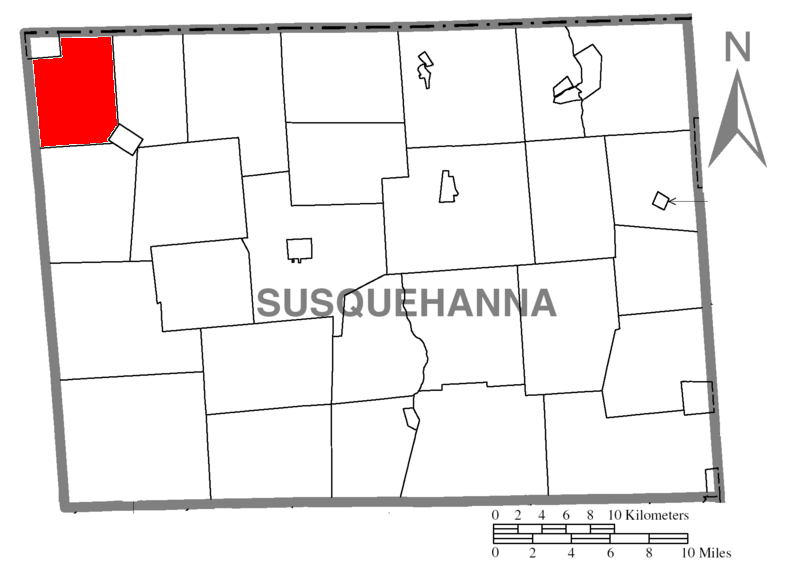
- Location of Apolacon Township in Susquehanna County

- Location of Apolacon Township in Pennsylvania
- Coordinates: 41°58′00″N 76°04′59″W
- Country: United States
- State: Pennsylvania
- County: Susquehanna
- Settled: 1800

Area
  - Total: 22.76 sq mi (58.95 km^{2})
  - Land: 22.49 sq mi (58.26 km^{2})
  - Water: 0.26 sq mi (0.68 km^{2})

Population (2020)
  - Total: 426
  - Estimate (2021): 427
  - Density: 18.9/sq mi (7.31/km^{2})
- Time zone: UTC-5 (EST)
  - Summer (DST): UTC-4 (EDT)
- Area code: 570
- FIPS code: 42-02712

Apolacon Township is a township in Susquehanna County, Pennsylvania, United States. The population was 426 at the 2020 census.

== Geography ==
According to the United States Census Bureau, the township has a total area of 22.8 square miles (59 km^{2}), of which 22.5 square miles (58 km^{2}) is land and 0.3 square miles (0.78 km^{2}) (1.16%) is water.

== Demographics ==
Historical population
Census	Pop.	Note	%±
2010	500		—
2020	426		−14.8%
2021 (est.)	427		0.2%
U.S. Decennial Census

As of the census of 2010, there were 500 people, 204 households, and 149 families residing in the township. The population density was 22.2 people per square mile (8.6 people/km^{2}). There were 290 housing units at an average density of 12.9 per square mile (5.0/km^{2}). The racial makeup of the township was 98.4% White, 0.4% African American, 0.4% Native American, 0.6% Asian, and 0.2% from two or more races. Hispanic or Latino of any race were 1% of the population.

There were 204 households, out of which 27% had children under the age of 18 living with them, 62.7% were married couples living together, 4.9% had a female householder with no husband present, and 27% were non-families. 21.1% of all households were made up of individuals, and 5.9% had someone living alone who was 65 years of age or older. The average household size was 2.45 and the average family size was 2.83.

In the township the population was spread out, with 19.6% under the age of 18, 63.4% from 18 to 64, and 17% who were 65 years of age or older. The median age was 46.3 years.

The median income for a household in the township was $47,500, and the median income for a family was $58,958. Males had a median income of $34,063 versus $30,750 for females. The per capita income for the township was $23,042. About 6.5% of families and 10.4% of the population were below the poverty line, including 15% of those under age 18 and 6.1% of those age 65 or over.
