= Middletown Township, Susquehanna County, Pennsylvania =

Township in Pennsylvania, United States

- Township
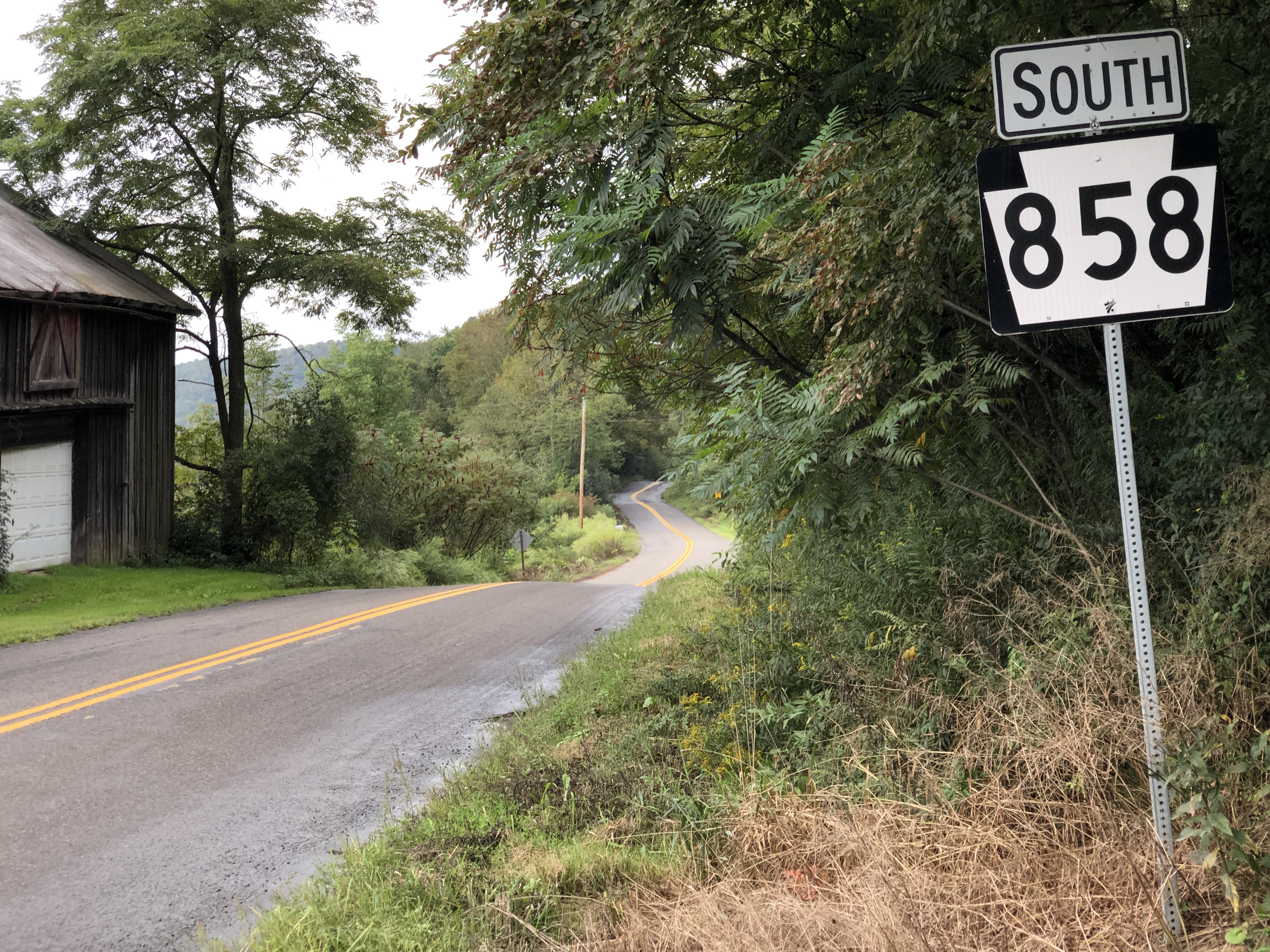
- PA 858 in Middletown Township

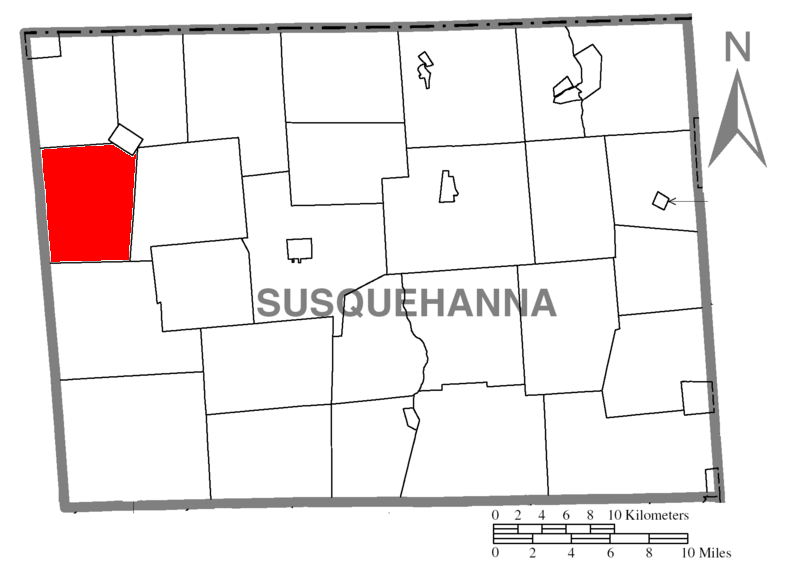

- Location of Pennsylvania in the United States
- Coordinates: 41°53′00″N 76°07′35″W
- Country: United States
- State: Pennsylvania
- County: Susquehanna
- Settled: 1799
- Incorporated: 1813

Area
  - Total: 28.91 sq mi (74.88 km^{2})
  - Land: 28.90 sq mi (74.86 km^{2})
  - Water: 0.0077 sq mi (0.02 km^{2})

Population (2020)
  - Total: 283 ▼
  - Estimate (2021): 282
  - Density: 12.1/sq mi (4.69/km^{2})
- Time zone: UTC-5 (EST)
  - Summer (DST): UTC-4 (EDT)
- Area code: 570
- FIPS code: 42-115-49152

Middletown Township is a township in Susquehanna County, Pennsylvania, United States. The population was 283 at the 2020 census.

== Geography ==
According to the United States Census Bureau, the township has a total area of 28.9 square miles (75 km^{2}), of which 28.9 square miles (75 km^{2}) is land and a negligible amount of water.

== Demographics ==
Historical population
Census	Pop.	Note	%±
2010	382		—
2020	283		−25.9%
2021 (est.)	282		−0.4%
U.S. Decennial Census

As of the census of 2010, there were 382 people, 151 households, and 107 families residing in the township. The population density was 13.2 people per square mile (5.1 people/km^{2}). There were 275 housing units at an average density of 9.5 per square mile (3.7/km^{2}). The racial makeup of the township was 98.4% White, 0.5% Asian, 0.3% from Pacific Islander, and 0.8% from two or more races. Hispanic or Latino of any race were 1.6% of the population.

There were 151 households, out of which 28.5% had children under the age of 18 living with them, 57.6% were married couples living together, 4.6% had a female householder with no husband present, and 29.1% were non-families. 21.9% of all households were made up of individuals, and 12.6% had someone living alone who was 65 years of age or older. The average household size was 2.53 and the average family size was 2.93.

In the township the population was spread out, with 20.7% under the age of 18, 62.3% from 18 to 64, and 17% who were 65 years of age or older. The median age was 44 years.

The median income for a household in the township was $38,393, and the median income for a family was $42,917. Males had a median income of $31,513 versus $33,333 for females. The per capita income for the township was $19,810. About 17.3% of families and 25.7% of the population were below the poverty line, including 58.4% of those under age 18 and 2.5% of those age 65 or over.
