= Browntown, Bradford County, Pennsylvania =

Unincorporated community in Pennsylvania, US

Coordinates: 41°39′03″N 76°14′25″W

Browntown is an unincorporated community along U.S. Route 6 in Wyalusing Township, Pennsylvania, United States. It is part of Northeastern Pennsylvania. The community borders the Susquehanna River.
