= Rushville, Pennsylvania =

Unincorporated community in Pennsylvania, US

- Unincorporated community
- Location within Pennsylvania
- Coordinates: 41°46′57″N 76°07′20″W
- Country: United States
- State: Pennsylvania
- County: Susquehanna
- Elevation: 873 ft (266 m)
- Time zone: UTC-5 (Eastern (EST))
  - Summer (DST): UTC-4 (EDT)
- ZIP code: 18828
- Area codes: 272 & 570
- GNIS feature ID: 1204562

Rushville is an unincorporated community in Susquehanna County, Pennsylvania, United States. The community is located along Pennsylvania Route 706, 13.1 miles (21.1 km) west-southwest of Montrose. Rushville had a post office until October 5, 2002.
