= Camptown, Pennsylvania =

Unincorporated community in Pennsylvania, US

- Unincorporated community
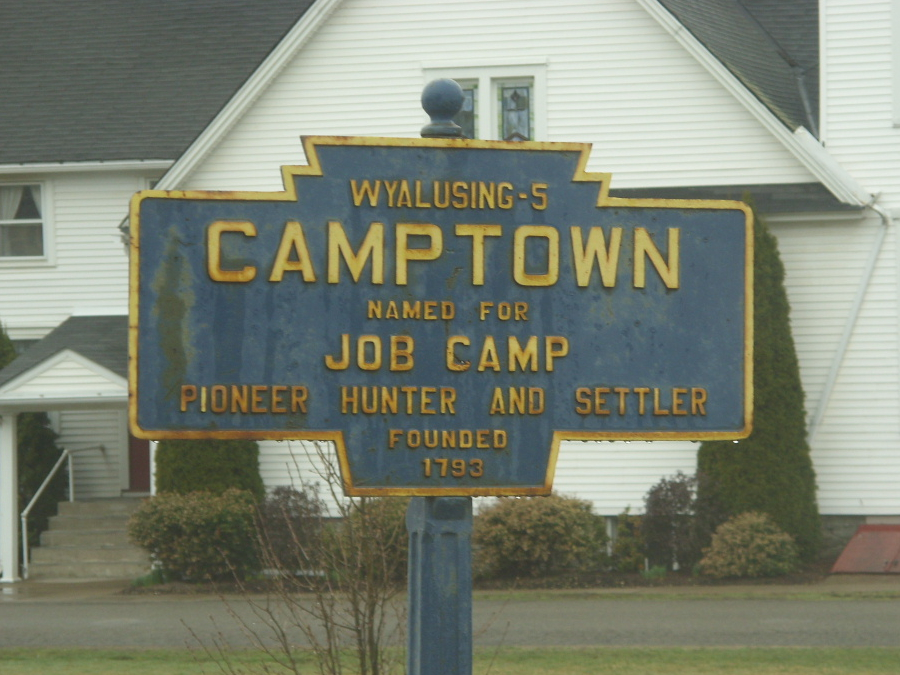
- Keystone Sign for Camptown

- Location within Pennsylvania
- Coordinates: 41°43′52″N 76°14′05″W
- Country: United States
- State: Pennsylvania
- County: Bradford
- Elevation: 751 ft (229 m)
- Time zone: UTC-5 (Eastern (EST))
  - Summer (DST): UTC-4 (EDT)
- ZIP code: 18815
- Area codes: 272 & 570
- GNIS feature ID: 1171144

Camptown is an unincorporated community in Bradford County, Pennsylvania, United States. The community is located at the intersection of Pennsylvania Route 409 and Pennsylvania Route 706 4.6 miles (7.4 km) north-northeast of Wyalusing. Camptown has a post office with ZIP code 18815.

== Popular culture ==
The town is known as the inspiration for the 1850 minstrel song "Camptown Races" by Stephen Foster.
