= Stevensville, Pennsylvania =

Unincorporated community in Pennsylvania, US

- Unincorporated community
- Location within Pennsylvania
- Coordinates: 41°45′38″N 76°10′35″W
- Country: United States
- State: Pennsylvania
- County: Bradford
- Elevation: 866 ft (264 m)
- Time zone: UTC-5 (Eastern (EST))
  - Summer (DST): UTC-4 (EDT)
- ZIP code: 18845
- Area codes: 570 and 272
- GNIS feature ID: 1188642

Stevensville is an unincorporated community in Stevens Township, Bradford County, Pennsylvania, United States.

== Notable people ==
- Cyrus Avery (1871–1963), businessman, was born in Stevensville.
- William Thomas Grant (1876–1972), businessman, was born in Stevensville.
