= Wyalusing Township, Pennsylvania =

Township in Pennsylvania, US

Coordinates: 41°42′33″N 76°15′10″W

- Township
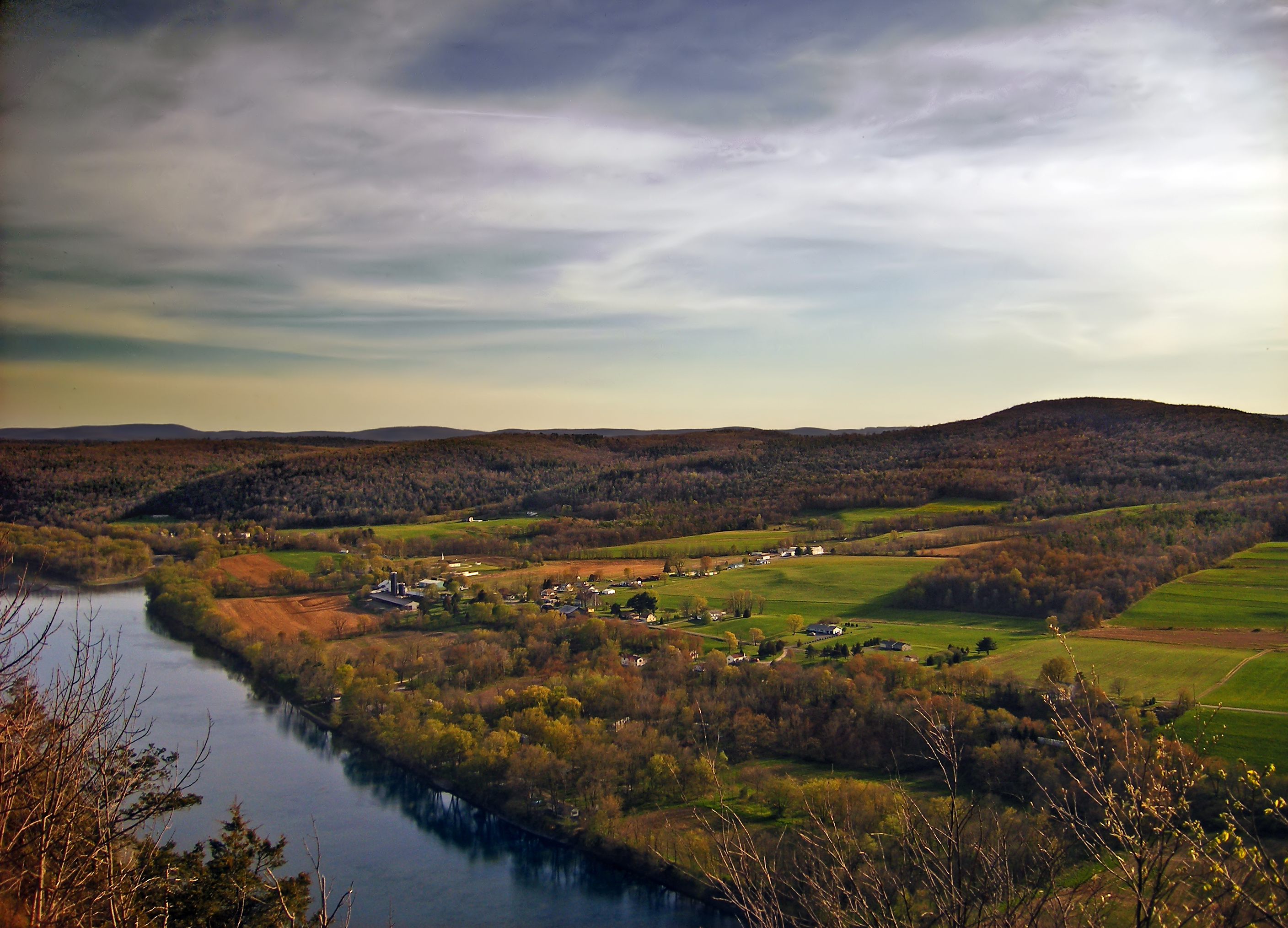
- View from Wyalusing Rocks

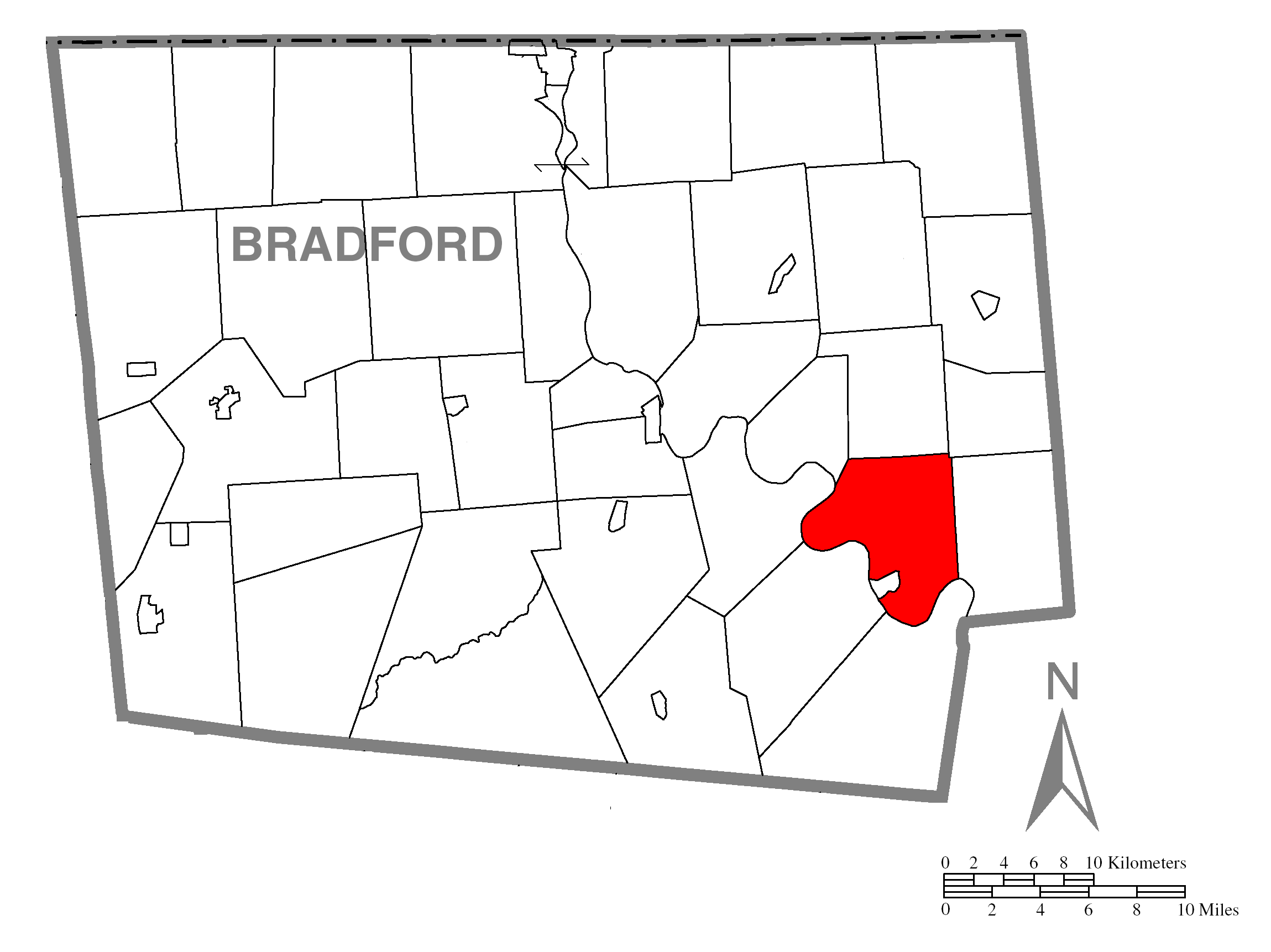
- Map of Bradford County with Wyalusing Township highlighted

- Map of Bradford County, Pennsylvania
- Country: United States
- State: Pennsylvania
- County: Bradford
- Settled: 1773
- Incorporated: 1790

Area
  - Total: 28.82 sq mi (74.64 km^{2})
  - Land: 27.93 sq mi (72.34 km^{2})
  - Water: 0.89 sq mi (2.30 km^{2})

Population (2010)
  - Total: 1,242
  - Estimate (2016): 1,230
  - Density: 44/sq mi (17/km^{2})
- Area code: 570
- FIPS code: 42-015-86664

Wyalusing Township is a township in Bradford County, Pennsylvania. It is part of Northeastern Pennsylvania. The population was 1,242 at the 2010 census.

== History ==
The Ellen and Charles F. Welles House was added to the National Register of Historic Places in 1999.

== Geography ==
Wyalusing Township is located in southeast Bradford County, along the northeast bank of the Susquehanna River. It is bordered by Standing Stone Township to the northwest, Herrick Township to the north, Stevens Township to the northeast, and Tuscarora Township to the east. Across the Susquehanna River are Wilmot Township to the south, Terry Township to the southwest, and Asylum Township to the west. The borough of Wyalusing lies along the river on the Terry Township border but is separate from Wyalusing Township. The unincorporated community of Camptown is in the northeast part of the township, and Browntown is in the south.

According to the United States Census Bureau, the township has a total area of 28.8 square miles (74.6 km^{2}), of which 27.9 square miles (72.3 km^{2}) is land and 0.89 square miles (2.3 km^{2}), or 3.08%, is water. Wyalusing Creek flows from north to south through the eastern part of the township, into the Susquehanna River.

== Demographics ==
Historical population
Census	Pop.	Note	%±
2010	1,242		—
2016 (est.)	1,230		−1.0%
U.S. Decennial Census

As of the census of 2000, there were 1,341 people, 495 households, and 357 families residing in the township. The population density was 47.8 inhabitants per square mile (18.5/km^{2}). There were 573 housing units at an average density of 20.4/sq mi (7.9/km^{2}). The racial makeup of the township was 97.02% White, 0.15% African American, 0.30% Native American, 0.15% Asian, 0.22% from other races, and 2.16% from two or more races. Hispanic or Latino of any race were 1.19% of the population.

There were 495 households, out of which 34.3% had children under the age of 18 living with them, 61.0% were married couples living together, 6.7% had a female householder with no husband present, and 27.7% were non-families. 22.4% of all households were made up of individuals, and 10.9% had someone living alone who was 65 years of age or older. The average household size was 2.60 and the average family size was 3.04.

In the township the population was spread out, with 25.4% under the age of 18, 6.9% from 18 to 24, 25.7% from 25 to 44, 26.0% from 45 to 64, and 16.1% who were 65 years of age or older. The median age was 39 years. For every 100 females, there were 95.8 males. For every 100 females age 18 and over, there were 92.3 males.

The median income for a household in the township was $37,222, and the median income for a family was $44,205. Males had a median income of $34,038 versus $25,526 for females. The per capita income for the township was $17,165. About 12.0% of families and 14.4% of the population were below the poverty line, including 22.0% of those under age 18 and 11.2% of those age 65 or over.

== See also ==
- Wyalusing Path
