= Wyalusing, Pennsylvania =

Borough in Pennsylvania, US

- Borough
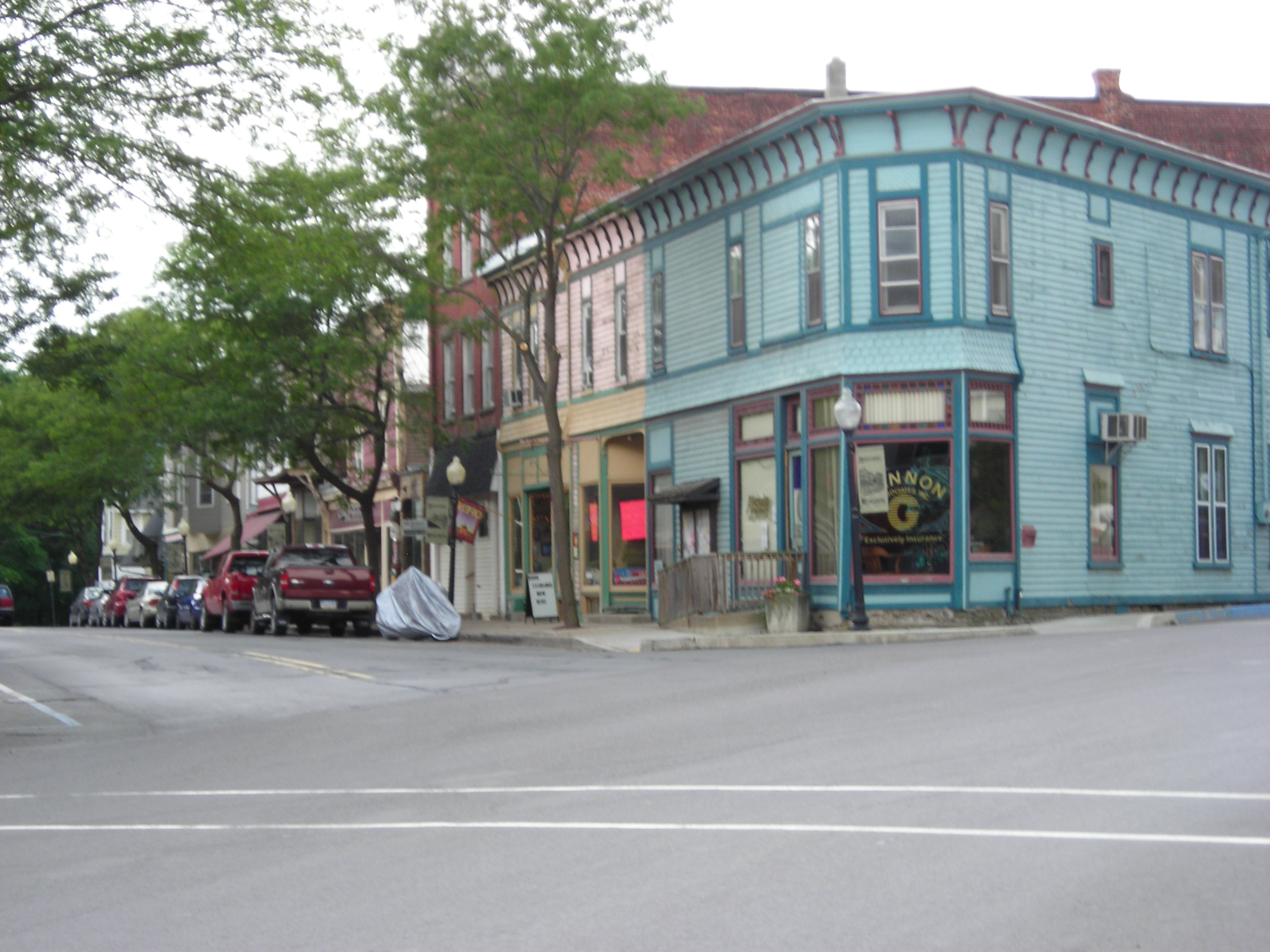
- Downtown Wyalusing in July 2012

- Logo

- Location of Wyalusing in Bradford County, Pennsylvania.

- Location of Wyalusing in the state of Pennsylvania Wyalusing (the United States)
- Coordinates: 41°40′03″N 76°15′48″W
- Country: United States
- State: Pennsylvania
- County: Bradford

Area
  - Total: 0.80 sq mi (2.06 km^{2})
  - Land: 0.73 sq mi (1.88 km^{2})
  - Water: 0.069 sq mi (0.18 km^{2})
- Elevation: 705 ft (215 m)

Population (2010)
  - Total: 596
  - Estimate (2019): 555
  - Density: 764.5/sq mi (295.19/km^{2})
- Time zone: UTC-5 (Eastern (EST))
  - Summer (DST): UTC-4 (EDT)
- ZIP code: 18853
- Area code: 570
- FIPS code: 42-86656
- Website: wyalusingborough.com

Pennsylvania Historical Marker
- Designated: March 15, 1949

Wyalusing is a borough in Bradford County, Pennsylvania, United States. It is part of Northeastern Pennsylvania. As of the 2020 census, Wyalusing had a population of 613.

== History ==
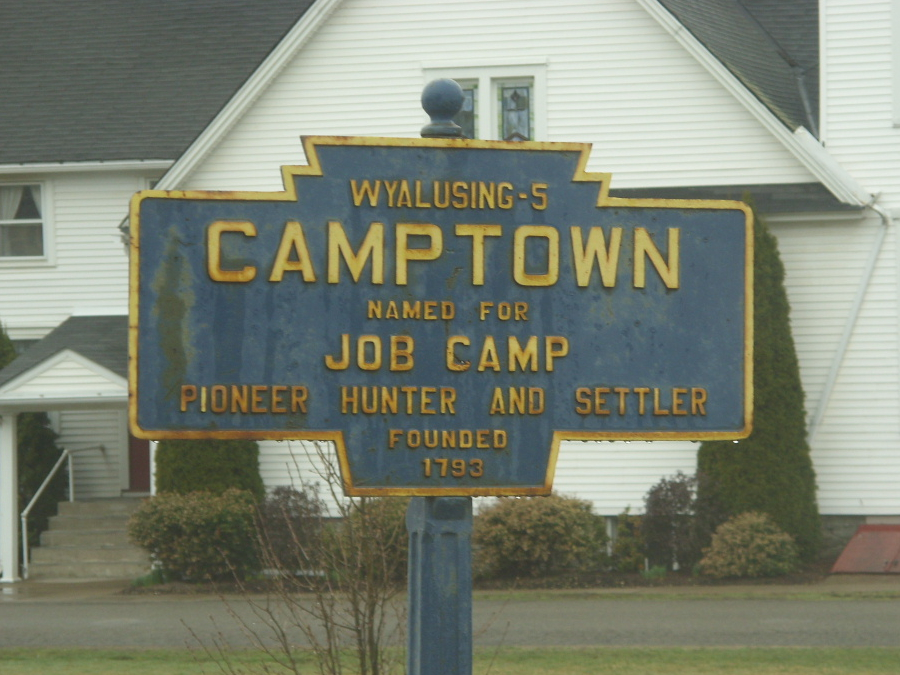
Keystone Marker for Camptown, the inspiration for "Camptown Races", 4.2 miles (6.8 km) north of Wyalusing.

The history of Wyalusing dates back centuries. It was originally known as M'chwihilusing. The Wyalusing Path was a historic trace that ran from what is now Wyalusing to the Native American village of Canaserage (what is now Muncy, on the West Branch Susquehanna River). Before 1750, Wyalusing was known as Gahontoto and was home to the Tehotitachsae of Native Americans. Eventually, this small tribe was completely wiped out by the Cayuga tribe.

In the spring of 1765, the Moravian Christian Munsees, a group of absolute pacifists, founded a settlement Friedenshütten (Tents or Cabins of Peace) in what is now Wyalusing. This settlement lasted for several years, but was finally abandoned when the group led by David Zeisberger moved to Schoenbrunn (near Gnadenhutten, Ohio) in 1772. In 1792, the chief of the Cayugas and approximately 20 other families rebuilt the town.

In the 19th century, the town began to prosper as it became a shipping area for logs and other items on the Susquehanna River. In 1820, the construction of the Welles Mill along Wyalusing Creek made Wyalusing a prime area for people to farm and raise crops. In 1887, Wyalusing became a borough. Many of the buildings constructed in the late 19th century and early 1920s are still part of Main Street today.

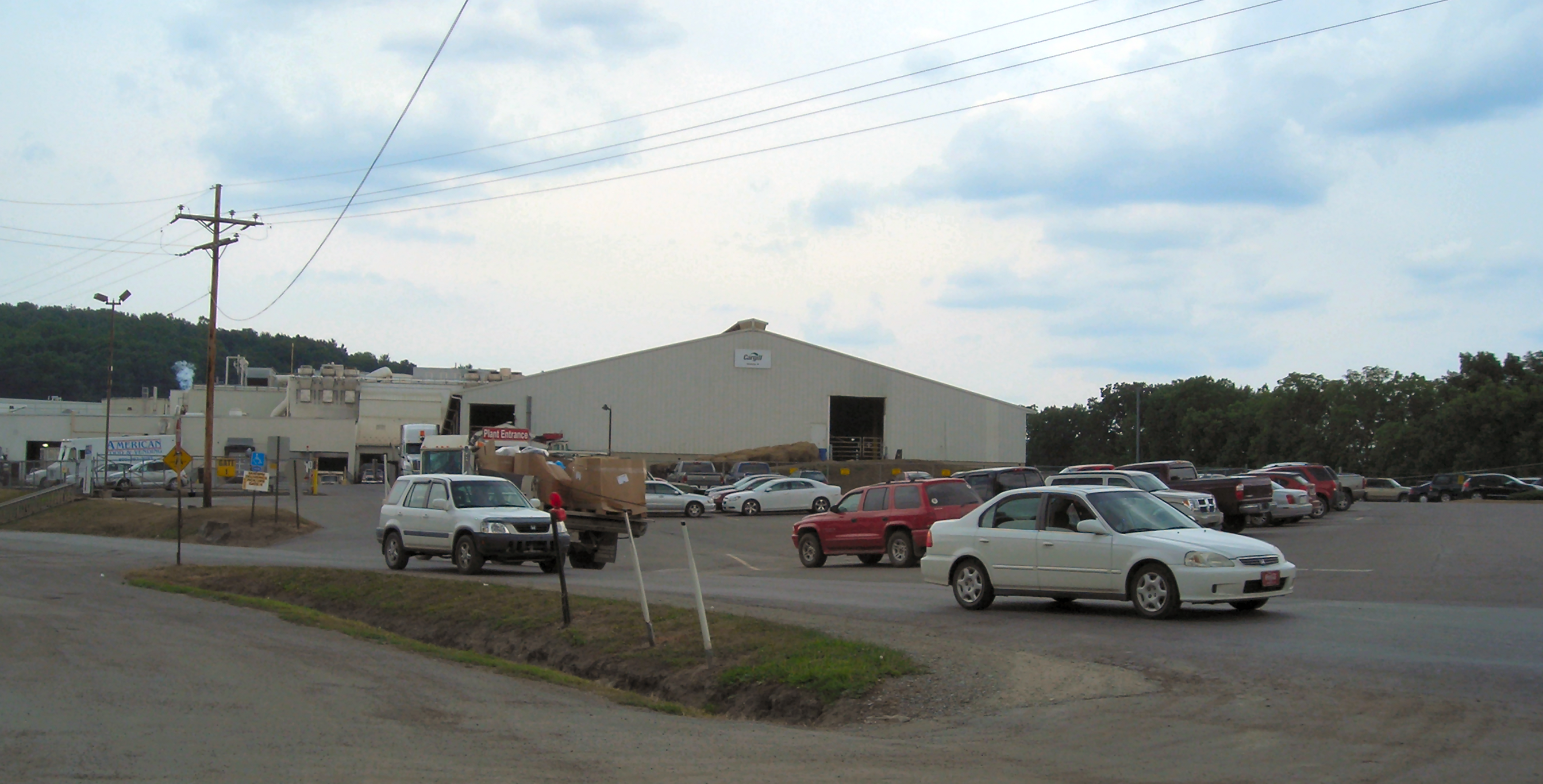
Cargill meat packing plant, Wyalusing

Wyalusing is home to one of the biggest beef processing plants on the East Coast. Cargill regional beef Wyalusing is located just a couple miles outside of town. This plant was originally started in the late 1970s by the local Taylor family as a small meat processing plant. It eventually grew into a multimillion-dollar business that employs over 1,200 people from the surrounding area. Cargill is one of the biggest suppliers of ground beef to large grocery chains such as Wegmans, Giant, Shop Rite and more. In 2002, the Taylor family sold the business to the Cargill corporation, one of the largest privately owned companies in the United States.

The Wyalusing Borough Historic District was added to the National Register of Historic Places in 2003.

== Geography ==
Wyalusing is located in southeastern Bradford County at 41°40′3″N 76°15′48″W (41.667407, -76.263375). It is on the northeast bank of the Susquehanna River at the confluence with Wyalusing Creek. The borough is bordered on the north, east, and south by Wyalusing Township and on the west, across the Susquehanna, by Terry Township.

U.S. Route 6 passes through the center of the borough, following the Susquehanna River. It leads southeast 24 miles (39 km) to Tunkhannock and northwest 15 miles (24 km) to Towanda, the Bradford County seat. Pennsylvania Route 706 leaves northeast from the center of the borough, leading 37 miles (60 km) to U.S. Route 11 and Interstate 81 at New Milford.

According to the United States Census Bureau, the borough has a total area of 0.81 square miles (2.1 km^{2}), of which 0.73 square miles (1.9 km^{2}) is land and 0.08 square miles (0.2 km^{2}), or 8.58%, is water.

== Demographics ==
Historical population
Census	Pop.	Note	%±
1890	438		—
1900	525		19.9%
1910	580		10.5%
1920	628		8.3%
1930	709		12.9%
1940	706		−0.4%
1950	612		−13.3%
1960	685		11.9%
1970	723		5.5%
1980	716		−1.0%
1990	686		−4.2%
2000	564		−17.8%
2010	596		5.7%
2020	613		2.9%

As of the census of 2000, there were 564 people, 264 households, and 145 families residing in the borough. The population density was 706.0 inhabitants per square mile (272.6/km^{2}). There were 280 housing units at an average density of 350.5 per square mile (135.3/km^{2}). The racial makeup of the borough was 98.40% White, 0.35% African American, 0.89% Native American, and 0.35% from two or more races. Hispanic or Latino of any race were 1.06% of the population.

There were 264 households, out of which 23.1% had children under the age of 18 living with them, 43.6% were married couples living together, 8.3% had a female householder with no husband present, and 44.7% were non-families. 39.8% of all households were made up of individuals, and 22.3% had someone living alone who was 65 years of age or older. The average household size was 2.05 and the average family size was 2.75.

In the borough the population was spread out, with 20.6% under the age of 18, 6.6% from 18 to 24, 22.9% from 25 to 44, 24.5% from 45 to 64, and 25.5% who were 65 years of age or older. The median age was 45 years. For every 100 females, there were 78.5 males. For every 100 females age 18 and over, there were 77.8 males.

The median income for a household in the borough was $30,625, and the median income for a family was $41,429. Males had a median income of $33,393 versus $21,250 for females. The per capita income for the borough was $27,229. About 4.9% of families and 12.3% of the population were below the poverty line, including 5.8% of those under age 18 and 24.2% of those age 65 or over.

== Attractions ==
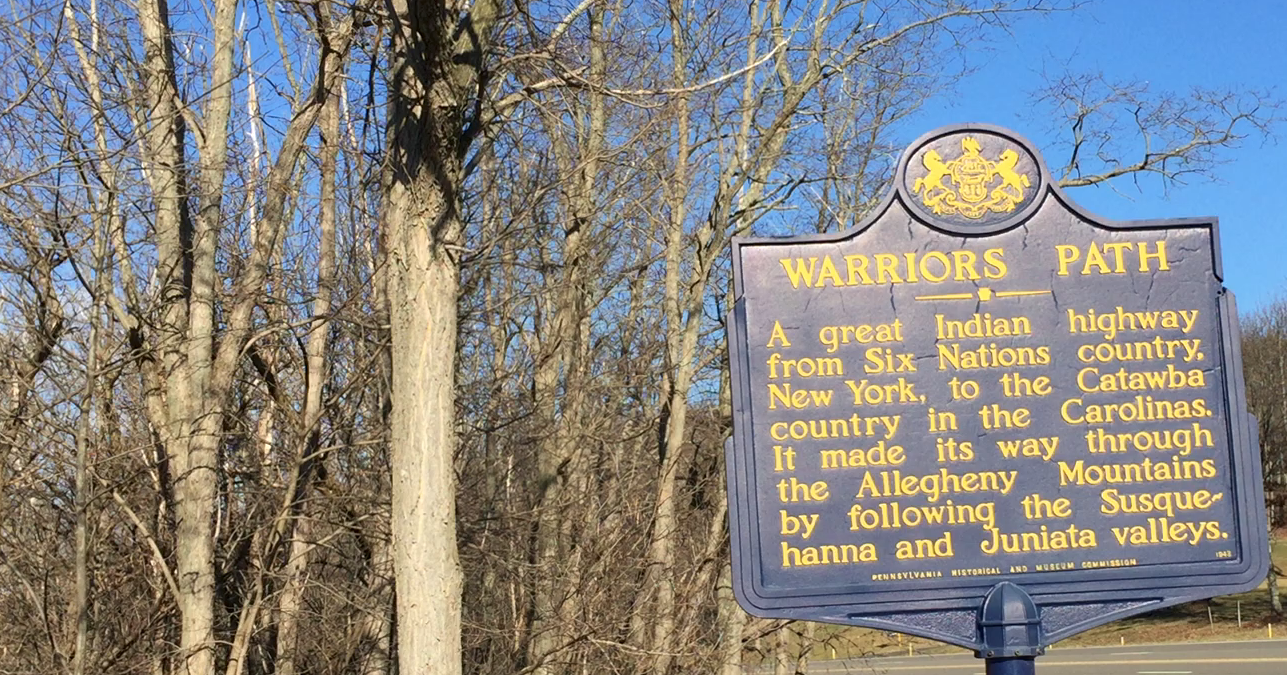
Warrior's Path Historic Marker at the Wyalusing Rocks

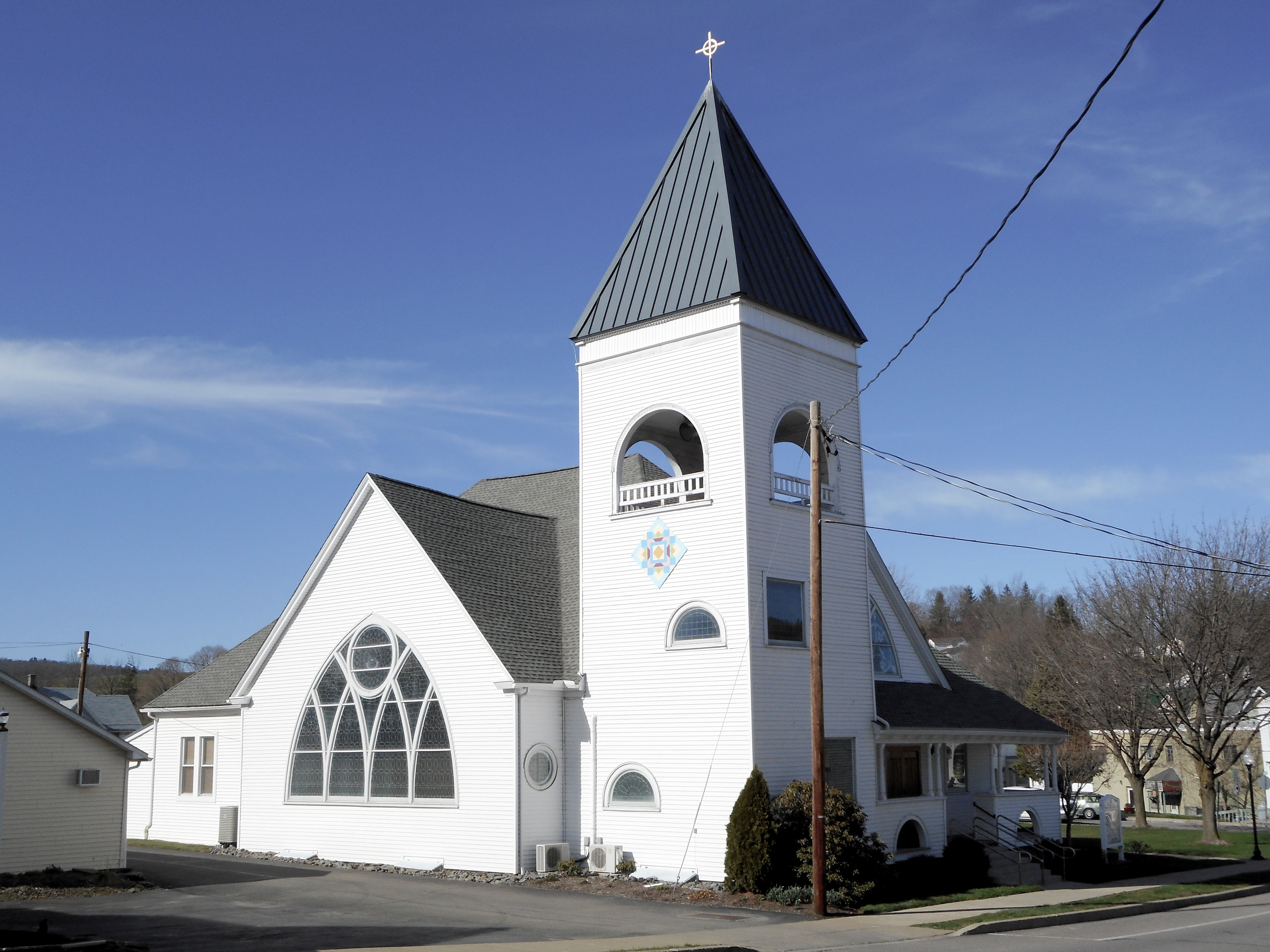
Presbyterian Church

Scenic attractions include the Wyalusing Rocks and the Marie Antoinette Lookout.

Community events include Wyalusing's Fall Festival and Street Fair, the Wyalusing Firemen's Parade, the Camptown Races, and the Wyalusing Wine festival.

== Newspapers ==
Wyalusing is home to The Rocket Courier, the result of the merger of The Wyalusing Rocket, founded in 1887, and The Wyoming County Courier, Founded in 1923. The Rocket Courier covers the surrounding Wyalusing area, as well local towns nearby. The Rocket is printed in Wyalusing and puts out a new issue every Thursday morning.

The Daily Review, founded in Towanda in 1879, acquired by the publishers of the Scranton Times in 1977 (now part of Times-Shamrock Communications), also provides Wyalusing coverage, serving Towanda, Bradford, and Sullivan counties, as well as Tioga County, New York. The Daily Review is printed in Towanda Township.

== Winery ==
The Grovedale Winery participates in the annual Wyalusing Valley Wine Festival, which is hosted by the Wyalusing Valley Museum Association, Inc. This festival offers wine tasting, food, and dancing with many wineries from Northeastern Pennsylvania in attendance each year.

== Notable people ==
- Joyce Steele (1935-2019), All-American Girls Professional Baseball League player.
- Lucas Steele, Tony Award nominated actor.
- Philip Van Doren Stern (1900-1984), author and historian who wrote the original story to It's a Wonderful Life.
- Johnny Swendel (1927-2022), country musician.
