= Rush Township, Susquehanna County, Pennsylvania =

Township in Pennsylvania, United States

- Township
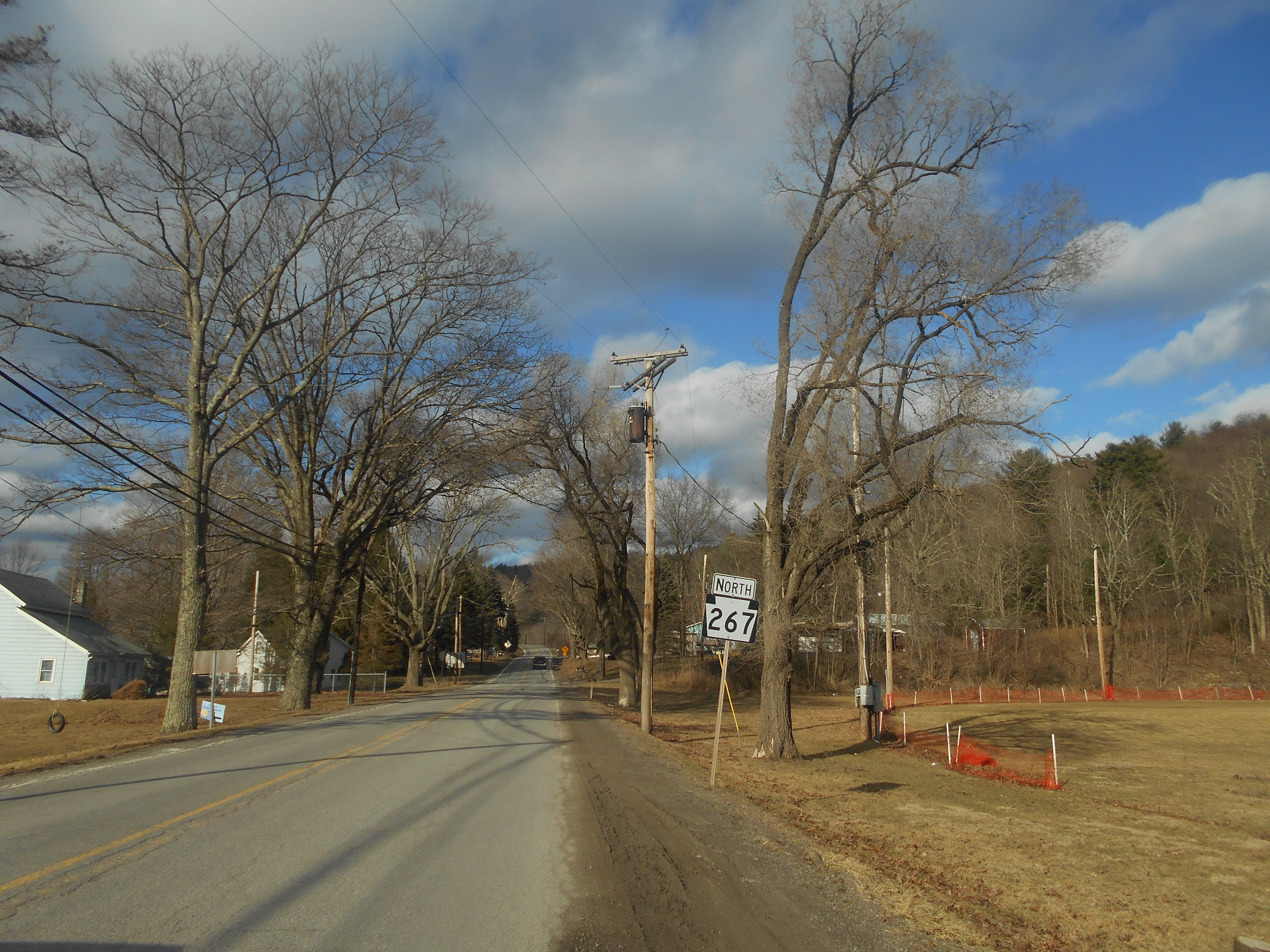
- PA 267 northbound in the village of Lawton

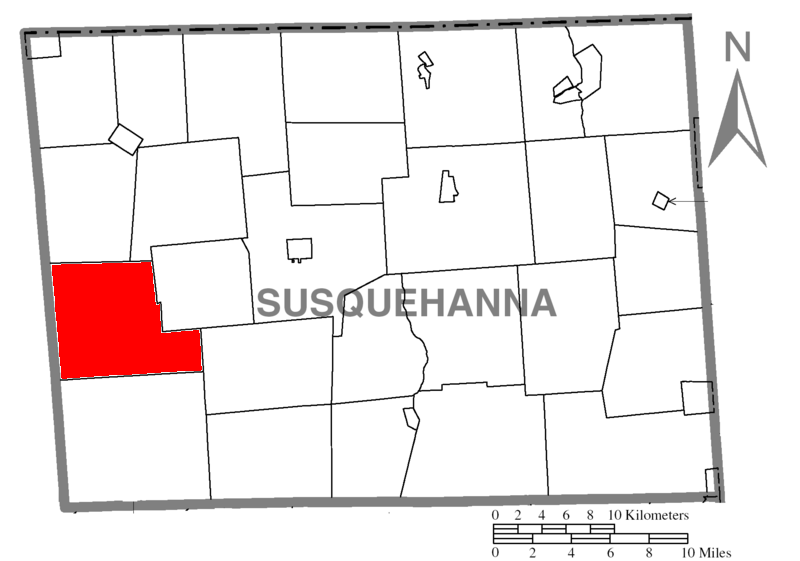

- Location of Pennsylvania in the United States
- Coordinates: 41°44′30″N 75°58′59″W
- Country: United States
- State: Pennsylvania
- County: Susquehanna
- Settled: 1794
- Incorporated: 1801

Area
  - Total: 38.57 sq mi (99.90 km^{2})
  - Land: 38.43 sq mi (99.53 km^{2})
  - Water: 0.14 sq mi (0.37 km^{2})

Population (2020)
  - Total: 1,134 ▼
  - Estimate (2021): 1,134
  - Density: 31.3/sq mi (12.08/km^{2})
- Time zone: UTC-5 (EST)
  - Summer (DST): UTC-4 (EDT)
- Area code: 570
- FIPS code: 42-115-66776

Rush Township is a township in Susquehanna County, Pennsylvania, United States. The population was 1,134 at the 2020 census. The village of Lawton is in the township.

== Geography ==
According to the United States Census Bureau, the township has a total area of 38.5 square miles (100 km^{2}), of which 38.4 square miles (99 km^{2}) is land and 0.1 square miles (0.26 km^{2}) (0.26%) is water.

== Demographics ==
Historical population
Census	Pop.	Note	%±
2010	1,267		—
2020	1,134		−10.5%
2021 (est.)	1,134		0.0%
U.S. Decennial Census

As of the census of 2010, there were 1,267 people, 509 households, and 368 families residing in the township. The population density was 33 people per square mile (13 people/km^{2}). There were 637 housing units at an average density of 16.6 per square mile (6.4/km^{2}). The racial makeup of the township was 97.6% White, 0.3% African American, 0.2% Native American, 0.9% Asian, 0.7% from other races, and 0.2% from two or more races. Hispanic or Latino of any race were 1.8% of the population.

There were 509 households, out of which 29.9% had children under the age of 18 living with them, 59.9% were married couples living together, 6.3% had a female householder with no husband present, and 27.7% were non-families. 21.4% of all households were made up of individuals, and 10% had someone living alone who was 65 years of age or older. The average household size was 2.49 and the average family size was 2.86.

In the township the population was spread out, with 21.8% under the age of 18, 59.4% from 18 to 64, and 18.8% who were 65 years of age or older. The median age was 45 years.

The median income for a household in the township was $39,531, and the median income for a family was $37,955. Males had a median income of $35,521 versus $27,414 for females. The per capita income for the township was $20,222. About 5.1% of families and 9.6% of the population were below the poverty line, including 18.6% of those under age 18 and 5.8% of those age 65 or over.
