= Towanda Area School District =

School district in Pennsylvania

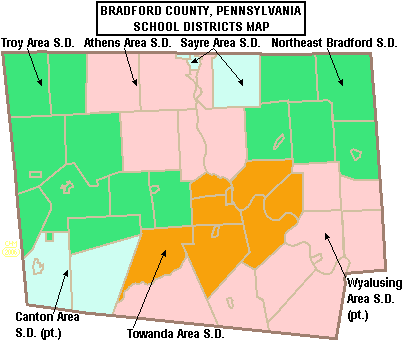

Location
- Towanda, Bradford County, Pennsylvania, 18848; United States

District information
- Type: Public
- Motto: Each Child By Name Achieving Proficiency in Reading and Math

Students and staff
- District mascot: Black Knight
- Colors: Black and orange

Other information
- Website: www.tsd.k12.pa.us

The Towanda Area School District is a small, rural public school district located in central Bradford County, Pennsylvania. It covers the Boroughs of Towanda and Monroe and Franklin Township, Monroe Township, Towanda Township, North Towanda Township, Wysox Township, Asylum Township and Standing Stone Township. Towanda Area School District encompasses approximately 163 square miles (420 km^{2}). According to 2019 federal census data, it serves a resident population of 10,819. In 2009, the district residents’ per capita income was $17,634, while the median family income was $41,286. In the Commonwealth, the median family income was $49,501 and the United States median family income was $49,445, in 2010.

The district operates Towanda Junior/Senior High School (7th-12th), J. Andrew Morrow Elementary School (K-2nd) and Towanda Elementary School (3rd-6th). In the junior and senior year, Towanda Area students may enroll in a vocational-technical course at the Northern Tier Career Center.

== Extracurriculars ==
The district offers a variety of clubs, activities and sports

=== Sports ===
The district offered the following in 2012:

- Baseball
- Basketball, boys and girls
- Cross country, boys and girls
- Football
- Golf, boys and girls
- Soccer, boys and girls
- Softball, girls
- Swimming and diving, boys and girls
- Tennis, boys and girls
- Track and field, boys and girls
- Wrestling, boys
- Volleyball, girls

In June 2010, the school district's fifth- and sixth-grade basketball program was transferred to the YMCA of Bradford County. Additionally, the board eliminated paying for meals for students on trips to participate in athletic competitions and eliminated school district funding to send students to national competitions.
