= Berrytown =

Berrytown can refer to several places:

- Berrytown, Delaware
- Berrytown, Louisville, Kentucky
- Berrytown, Pennsylvania
- Berrytown, Virginia

== See also ==
- Berryton (disambiguation)
