= Towanda Township =

Towanda Township may refer to the following townships in the United States:

- Towanda Township, McLean County, Illinois
- Towanda Township, Butler County, Kansas
- Towanda Township, Pennsylvania

== See also ==
- North Towanda Township, Pennsylvania
