= Bridge in Athens Township =

- Formerly listed on the U.S. National Register of Historic Places
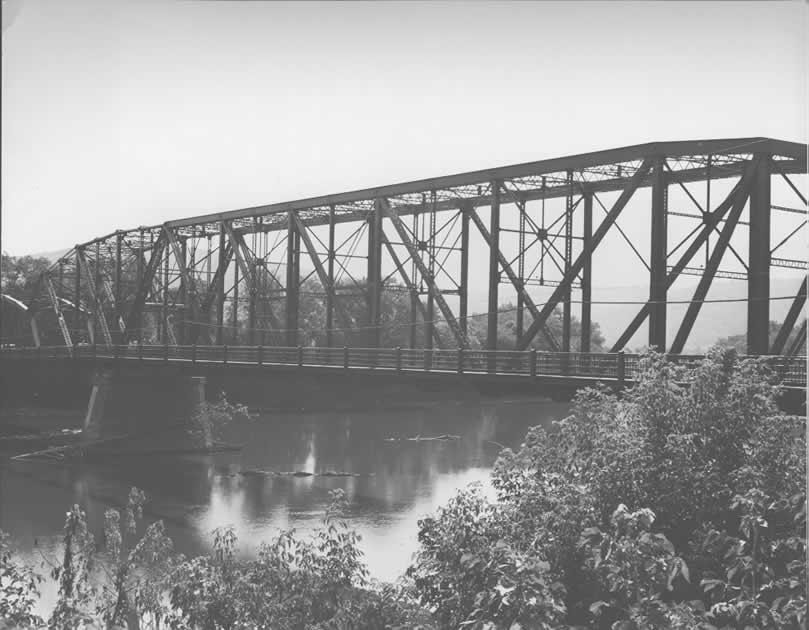
- Bridge in Athens Township, 1982

- Location within Pennsylvania Location within the United States
- Location: Legislative Route 08081 over the Susquehanna River, Athens Township and Athens, Pennsylvania
- Coordinates: 41°57′29″N 76°30′52″W
- Area: less than one acre
- Built: 1913
- Built by: Penn Bridge Co.; Bethlehem Steel Bridge Co.
- Architectural style: Pennsylvania (Petit)
- Demolished: 2005
- MPS: Highway Bridges Owned by the Commonwealth of Pennsylvania, Department of Transportation TR
- NRHP reference No.: 88000821

Significant dates
- Added to NRHP: June 22, 1988
- Removed from NRHP: August 22, 2012

Bridge in Athens Township was a historic Pennsylvania (petit) truss bridge in Athens Township and Athens, Bradford County, Pennsylvania. It spanned the Susquehanna River. It was built between 1913 and 1916, and measured 540 feet (164.6 m) long. It had two spans; one measuring 253 feet (77.1 m) long and built by the Penn Bridge Co. and the second measuring 287 feet (87.5 m) long and built by the Bethlehem Steel Bridge Co.

The bridge was listed on the National Register of Historic Places in 1988. It was replaced by a new bridge in 2005 and delisted from the National Register in 2012.
