= West Burlington Township, Pennsylvania =

Township in Pennsylvania, US

Coordinates: 41°45′43″N 76°36′59″W

- Township
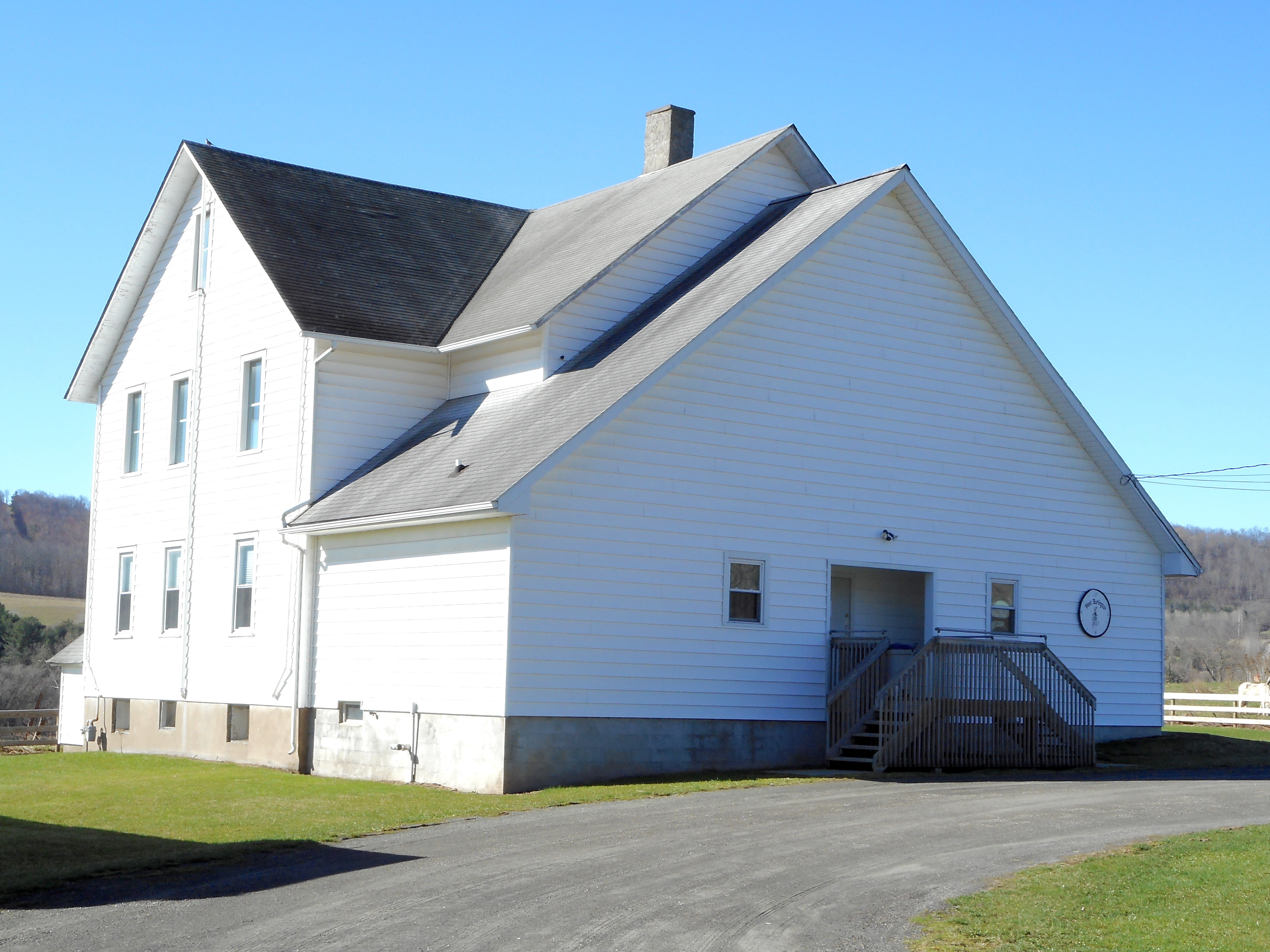
- West Burlington Township Municipal Building

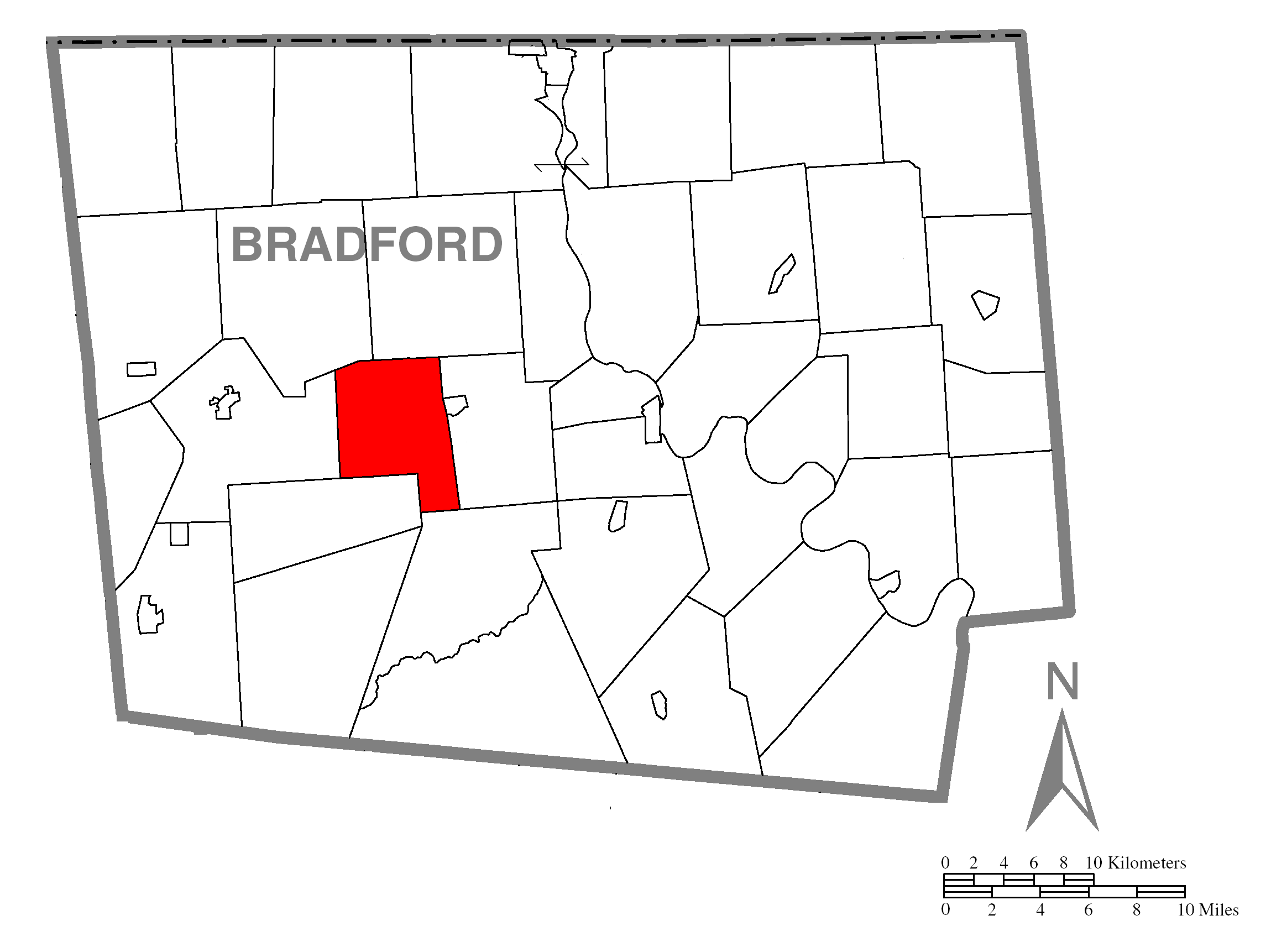
- Map of Bradford County with West Burlington Township highlighted

- Map of Bradford County, Pennsylvania
- Country: United States
- State: Pennsylvania
- County: Bradford
- Settled: 1790
- Incorporated: 1855

Area
  - Total: 24.12 sq mi (62.48 km^{2})
  - Land: 23.93 sq mi (61.98 km^{2})
  - Water: 0.19 sq mi (0.49 km^{2})

Population (2010)
  - Total: 696
  - Estimate (2016): 667
  - Density: 27.9/sq mi (10.76/km^{2})
- Area code: 570
- FIPS code: 42-015-82656

West Burlington Township is a township in Bradford County, Pennsylvania. It is part of Northeastern Pennsylvania. The population was 696 at the 2010 census. Children residing in the township are assigned to attend the Troy Area School District.

== History ==
The Methodist Episcopal Church of Burlington was added to the National Register of Historic Places in 1990.

== Geography ==
West Burlington Township is located in west-central Bradford County and is bordered by Springfield and Smithfield townships to the north, Burlington Township and Burlington borough to the east, Franklin Township to the south, Granville Township to the west and south, and Troy Township to the west. U.S. Route 6 runs east–west through the center of the township, following the valley of Sugar Creek and passing through the unincorporated community of West Burlington.

According to the United States Census Bureau, the township has a total area of 24.1 square miles (62.5 km^{2}), of which 23.9 square miles (62.0 km^{2}) is land and 0.19 square miles (0.5 km^{2}), or 0.79%, is water.

== Demographics ==
Historical population
Census	Pop.	Note	%±
2010	696		—
2016 (est.)	667		−4.2%
U.S. Decennial Census

As of the census of 2000, there were 782 people, 172 households, and 131 families residing in the township. The population density was 32.5 inhabitants per square mile (12.5/km^{2}). There were 214 housing units at an average density of 8.9/sq mi (3.4/km^{2}). The racial makeup of the township was 98.47% White, 0.64% African American, 0.13% Native American, and 0.77% from two or more races. Hispanic or Latino of any race were 0.26% of the population.

There were 172 households, out of which 37.2% had children under the age of 18 living with them, 61.6% were married couples living together, 8.1% had a female householder with no husband present, and 23.8% were non-families. 21.5% of all households were made up of individuals, and 8.7% had someone living alone who was 65 years of age or older. The average household size was 2.67 and the average family size was 3.05.

In the township the population was spread out, with 17.1% under the age of 18, 8.2% from 18 to 24, 24.2% from 25 to 44, 16.9% from 45 to 64, and 33.6% who were 65 years of age or older. The median age was 46 years. For every 100 females, there were 92.6 males. For every 100 females age 18 and over, there were 97.6 males.

The median income for a household in the township was $37,955, and the median income for a family was $38,472. Males had a median income of $30,556 versus $22,656 for females. The per capita income for the township was $15,291. About 5.0% of families and 7.3% of the population were below the poverty line, including 7.5% of those under age 18 and 12.5% of those age 65 or over.
