= Burlington Township, Pennsylvania =

Township in Pennsylvania, US

Coordinates: 41°45′52″N 76°34′29″W

- Township
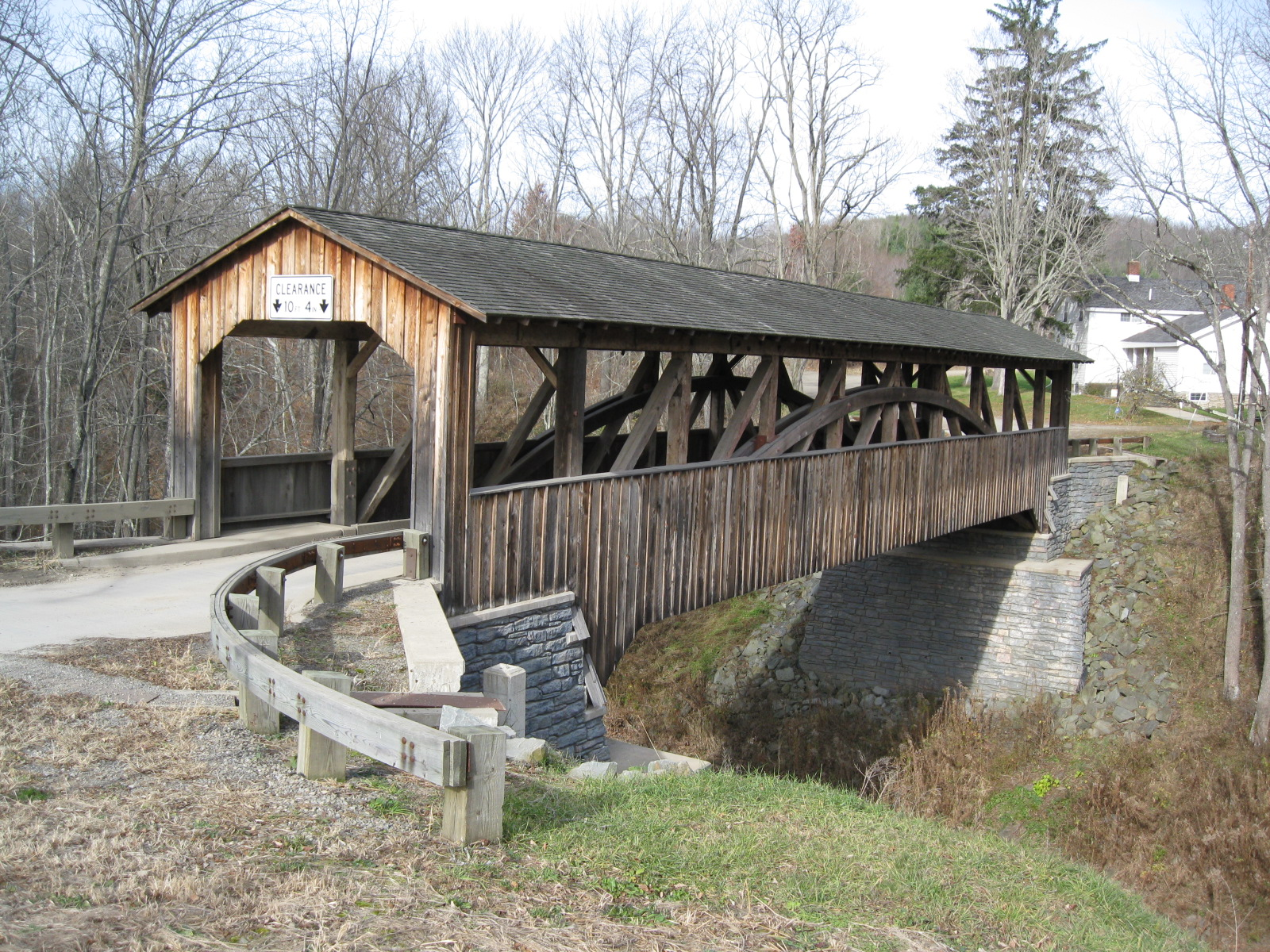
- Luther's Mill Covered Bridge

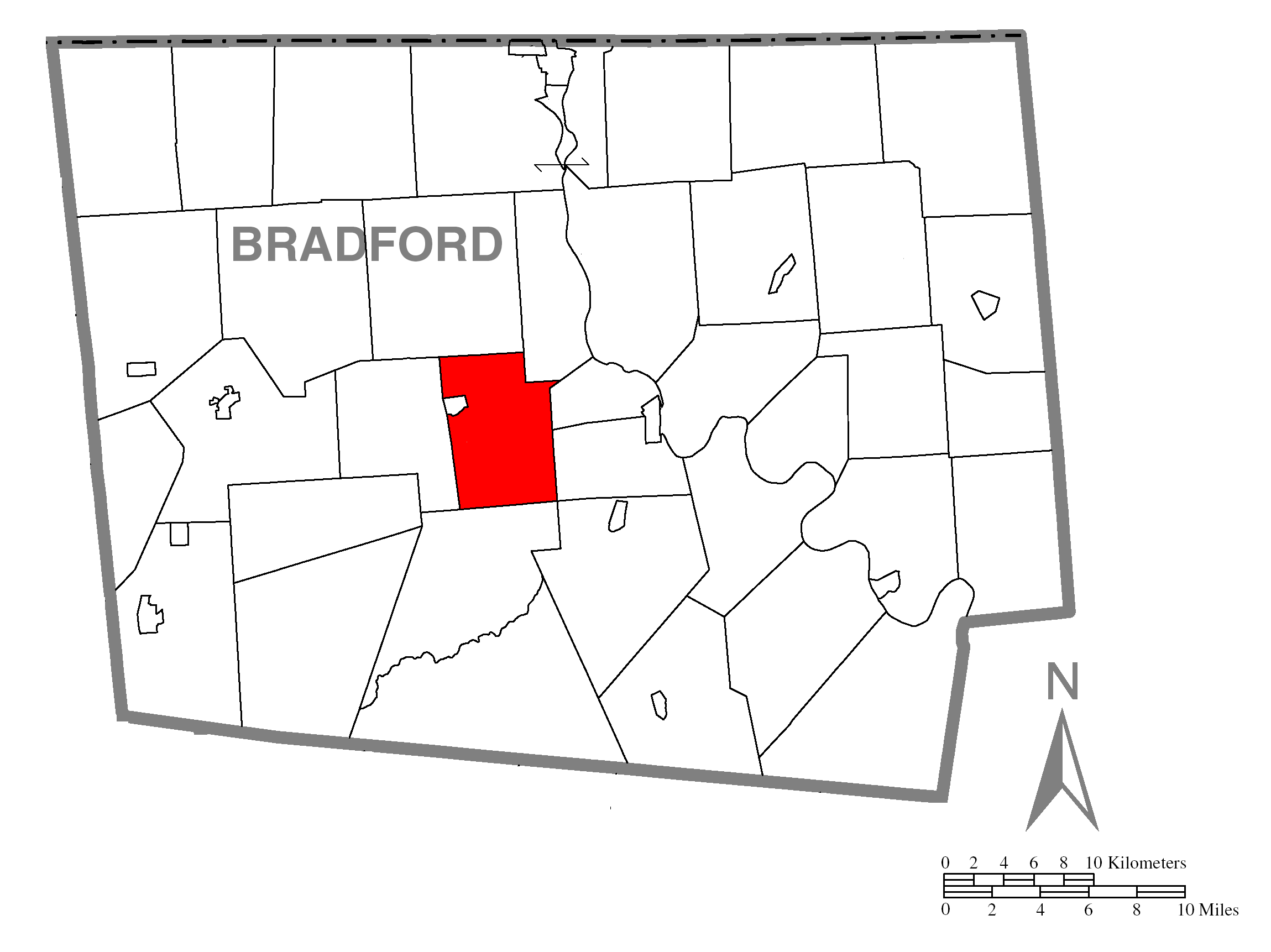
- Map of Bradford County with Burlington Township highlighted

- Map of Bradford County, Pennsylvania
- Country: United States
- State: Pennsylvania
- County: Bradford
- Settled: 1790
- Incorporated: 1802

Area
  - Total: 25.28 sq mi (65.48 km^{2})
  - Land: 25.07 sq mi (64.92 km^{2})
  - Water: 0.21 sq mi (0.55 km^{2})

Population (2020)
  - Total: 677
  - Estimate (2023): 675
  - Density: 31.0/sq mi (11.97/km^{2})
- FIPS code: 42-015-10248

Burlington Township is a township in Bradford County, Pennsylvania, United States. It is part of Northeastern Pennsylvania. The population was 677 at the 2020 census. Children residing in the township are assigned to attend the Troy Area School District.

== Geography ==
Burlington Township is located in central Bradford County and is bordered by Smithfield Township to the north, Ulster Township to the northeast, North Towanda and Towanda townships to the east, Monroe Township touching the southeastern corner, Franklin Township to the south and West Burlington Township to the west. The borough of Burlington is bordered on the north, east, and south by Burlington Township and by West Burlington Township to the west.

U.S. Route 6 passes through the center of the township, following the valley of Sugar Creek, a tributary of the Susquehanna River. US 6 leads east to Towanda and west through Burlington borough to Troy.

According to the United States Census Bureau, the township has a total area of 25.3 square miles (65.5 km^{2}), of which 25.1 square miles (64.9 km^{2}) is land and 0.23 square miles (0.6 km^{2}), or 0.84%, is water.

== Demographics ==
Historical population
Census	Pop.	Note	%±
2010	791		—
2020	677		−14.4%
2023 (est.)	675		−0.3%
U.S. Decennial Census

As of the census of 2000, there were 799 people, 297 households, and 226 families residing in the township. The population density was 31.8 inhabitants per square mile (12.3/km^{2}). There were 385 housing units at an average density of 15.3/sq mi (5.9/km^{2}). The racial makeup of the township was 98.75% White, 0.13% African American, 0.13% Native American, 0.13% Asian, and 0.88% from two or more races. Hispanic or Latino of any race were 0.38% of the population.

There were 297 households, out of which 32.0% had children under the age of 18 living with them, 63.0% were married couples living together, 8.8% had a female householder with no husband present, and 23.9% were non-families. 19.5% of all households were made up of individuals, and 8.4% had someone living alone who was 65 years of age or older. The average household size was 2.69 and the average family size was 3.09.

In the township the population was spread out, with 26.3% under the age of 18, 6.8% from 18 to 24, 25.8% from 25 to 44, 28.7% from 45 to 64, and 12.5% who were 65 years of age or older. The median age was 39 years. For every 100 females, there were 104.3 males. For every 100 females age 18 and over, there were 99.0 males.

The median income for a household in the township was $35,724, and the median income for a family was $40,536. Males had a median income of $26,667 versus $20,882 for females. The per capita income for the township was $16,946. About 11.1% of families and 9.9% of the population were below the poverty line, including 11.9% of those under age 18 and 1.4% of those age 65 or over.
