= John Laporte (politician) =

American politician (1798–1862)

Member of the U.S. House of Representatives from Pennsylvania's 17th district
- In office March 4, 1833 – March 3, 1837
- Preceded by: Richard Coulter
- Succeeded by: Samuel W. Morris

20th Speaker of the Pennsylvania House of Representatives
- In office 1832 – August 22, 1862
- Preceded by: Frederick Smith
- Succeeded by: James Findley

Member of the Pennsylvania House of Representatives
- In office 1828–1832

Personal details
- Born: November 4, 1798 Asylum, Pennsylvania
- Died: August 22, 1862 (aged 63) Philadelphia, Pennsylvania
- Party: Jacksonian

John Laporte (November 4, 1798 – August 22, 1862) was a Jacksonian member of the U.S. House of Representatives from Pennsylvania. He also was the 26th Speaker of the Pennsylvania House of Representatives.

== Biography ==
John Laporte was born in Asylum, Pennsylvania. He was Auditor of Bradford County, Pennsylvania, in 1827 and 1828. He was a member of the Pennsylvania House of Representatives from 1828 to 1832 and served as speaker in 1831 and 1832. Laporte was elected as a Jacksonian to the Twenty-third and Twenty-fourth Congresses. He was not a candidate for renomination in 1836. He served as associate judge of Bradford County from 1837 to 1845. He was interested in the development of the North Branch Canal and served as surveyor general of Pennsylvania from 1845 to 1851. He was engaged in banking at Towanda, Pennsylvania, from 1850 to 1862.

He died in Philadelphia in 1862, aged 63; he was interred in the family cemetery at Asylum, Pennsylvania, near Towanda. Laporte, Pennsylvania is named after him.

== Sources ==
- United States Congress. "John Laporte (id: L000094)". Biographical Directory of the United States Congress.
- The Political Graveyard

U.S. House of Representatives
Preceded by Richard Coulter	Member of the U.S. House of Representatives from Pennsylvania's 17th congressional district 1833–1837	Succeeded by Samuel Wells Morris
