= Burlington, Pennsylvania =

Borough in Pennsylvania, US

- Borough
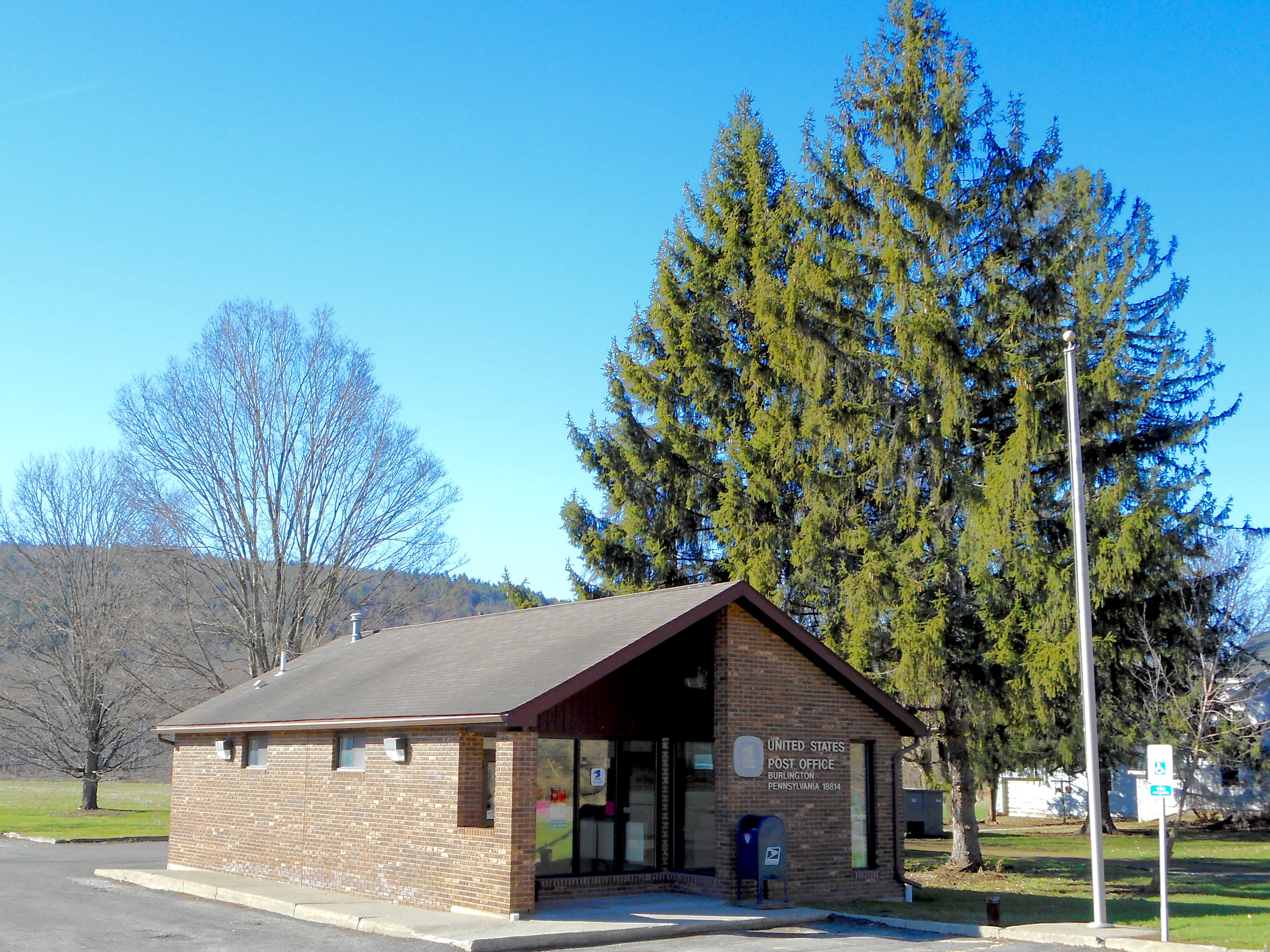
- Burlington Post Office

- Location of Burlington in Bradford County, Pennsylvania.

- Location of Burlington in the state of Pennsylvania
- Coordinates: 41°46′58″N 76°36′31″W
- Country: United States
- State: Pennsylvania
- County: Bradford
- Settled: 1790
- Incorporated: 1854

Area
  - Total: 0.59 sq mi (1.54 km^{2})
  - Land: 0.59 sq mi (1.52 km^{2})
  - Water: 0.012 sq mi (0.03 km^{2})
- Elevation: 1,138 ft (347 m)

Population (2020)
  - Total: 144
  - Density: 245.9/sq mi (94.96/km^{2})
- Time zone: UTC-5 (Eastern (EST))
  - Summer (DST): UTC-4 (EDT)
- Zip Code: 18814
- Area code: 570
- FIPS code: 42-10240
- GNIS feature ID: 1214950

Burlington is a borough in Bradford County, Pennsylvania, United States. It is part of Northeastern Pennsylvania. The population was 145 at the 2020 census. Children residing in the township are assigned to attend the Troy Area School District.

== Geography ==
Burlington is located in central Bradford County at 41°46′58″N 76°36′31″W (41.782906, -76.608549), on the north bank of Sugar Creek, a tributary of the Susquehanna River. It is bordered on the north, east, and south by Burlington Township and on the west by West Burlington Township.

U.S. Route 6 passes through the center of the borough, leading east 10 miles (16 km) to Towanda, the county seat, and west 10 miles (16 km) to Troy.

According to the United States Census Bureau, Burlington has a total area of 0.58 square miles (1.5 km^{2}), of which 0.02 square miles (0.04 km^{2}), or 2.40%, is water.

== Demographics ==
Historical population
Census	Pop.	Note	%±
1860	125		—
1870	203		62.4%
1880	200		−1.5%
1890	166		−17.0%
1900	179		7.8%
1910	142		−20.7%
1920	102		−28.2%
1930	137		34.3%
1940	156		13.9%
1950	148		−5.1%
1960	115		−22.3%
1970	148		28.7%
1980	162		9.5%
1990	479		195.7%
2000	182		−62.0%
2010	156		−14.3%
2020	144		−7.7%
2021 (est.)	145	▲	0.7%

As of the census of 2000, there were 182 people, 62 households, and 43 families residing in the borough. The population density was 302.8 people per square mile (116.9 people/km^{2}). There were 64 housing units at an average density of 106.5 per square mile (41.1/km^{2}). The racial makeup of the borough was 98.35% White, 0.55% Asian, and 1.10% from two or more races.

There were 62 households, out of which 35.5% had children under the age of 18 living with them, 54.8% were married couples living together, 11.3% had a female householder with no husband present, and 30.6% were non-families. 25.8% of all households were made up of individuals, and 9.7% had someone living alone who was 65 years of age or older. The average household size was 2.94 and the average family size was 3.44.

In the borough the population was spread out, with 27.5% under the age of 18, 7.1% from 18 to 24, 27.5% from 25 to 44, 22.0% from 45 to 64, and 15.9% who were 65 years of age or older. The median age was 34 years. For every 100 females there were 114.1 males. For every 100 females age 18 and over, there were 112.9 males.

The median income for a household in the borough was $36,250, and the median income for a family was $33,750. Males had a median income of $28,542 versus $17,500 for females. The per capita income for the borough was $15,951. About 10.9% of families and 14.8% of the population were below the poverty line, including 20.0% of those under the age of eighteen and none of those sixty five or over.

== Notable people ==
- Samuel McKean (1787–1841), U.S. Senator and U.S. Representative from Pennsylvania
- Thomas J. McKean (1810–1870), Union Army general
- Frederick B. Shaw (1869–1957), U.S. Army brigadier general
