= Athens Township, Bradford County, Pennsylvania =

Township in Pennsylvania, US

Coordinates: 41°57′30″N 76°37′35″W

- Township
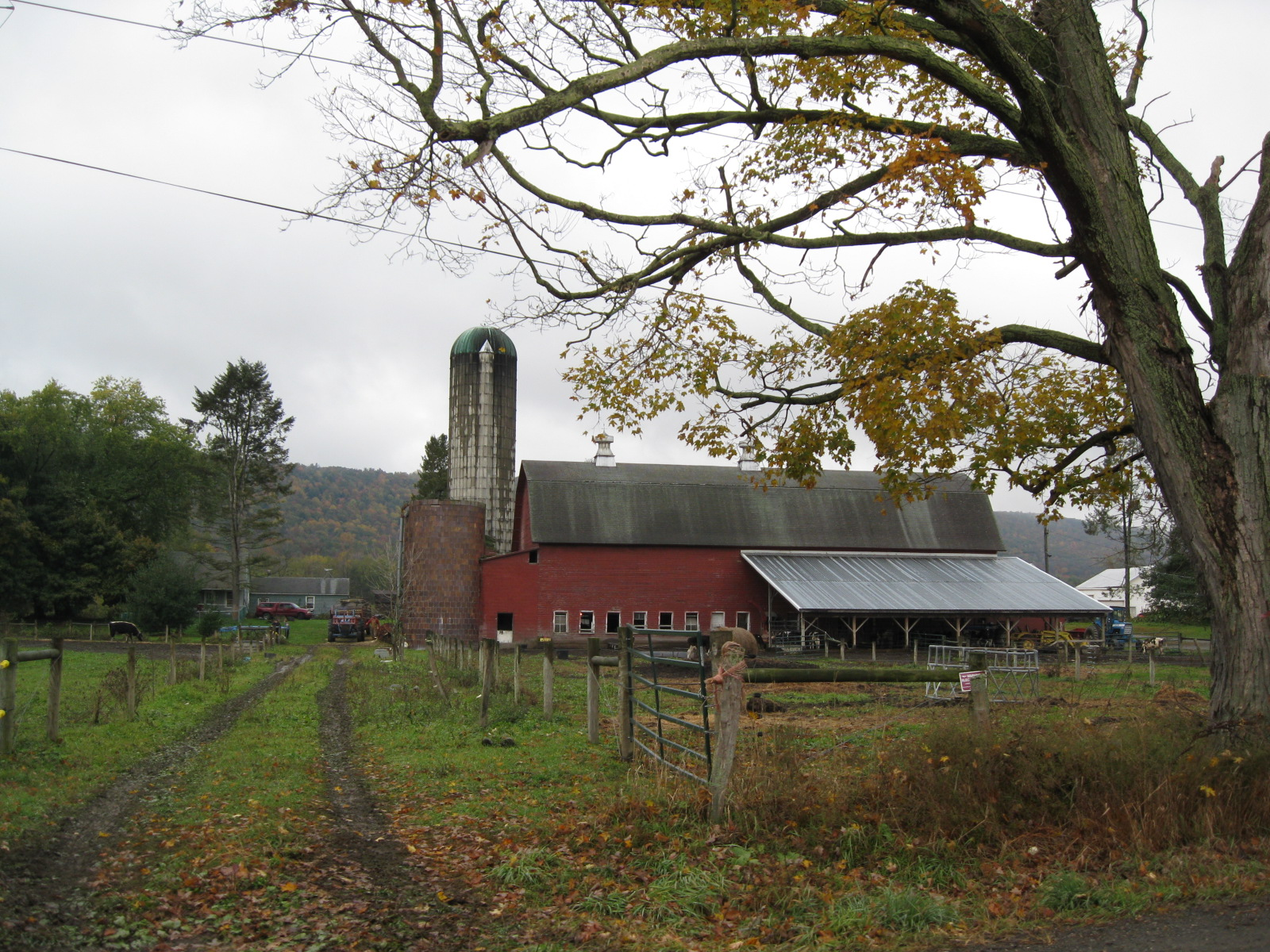
- A farm in Athens Township

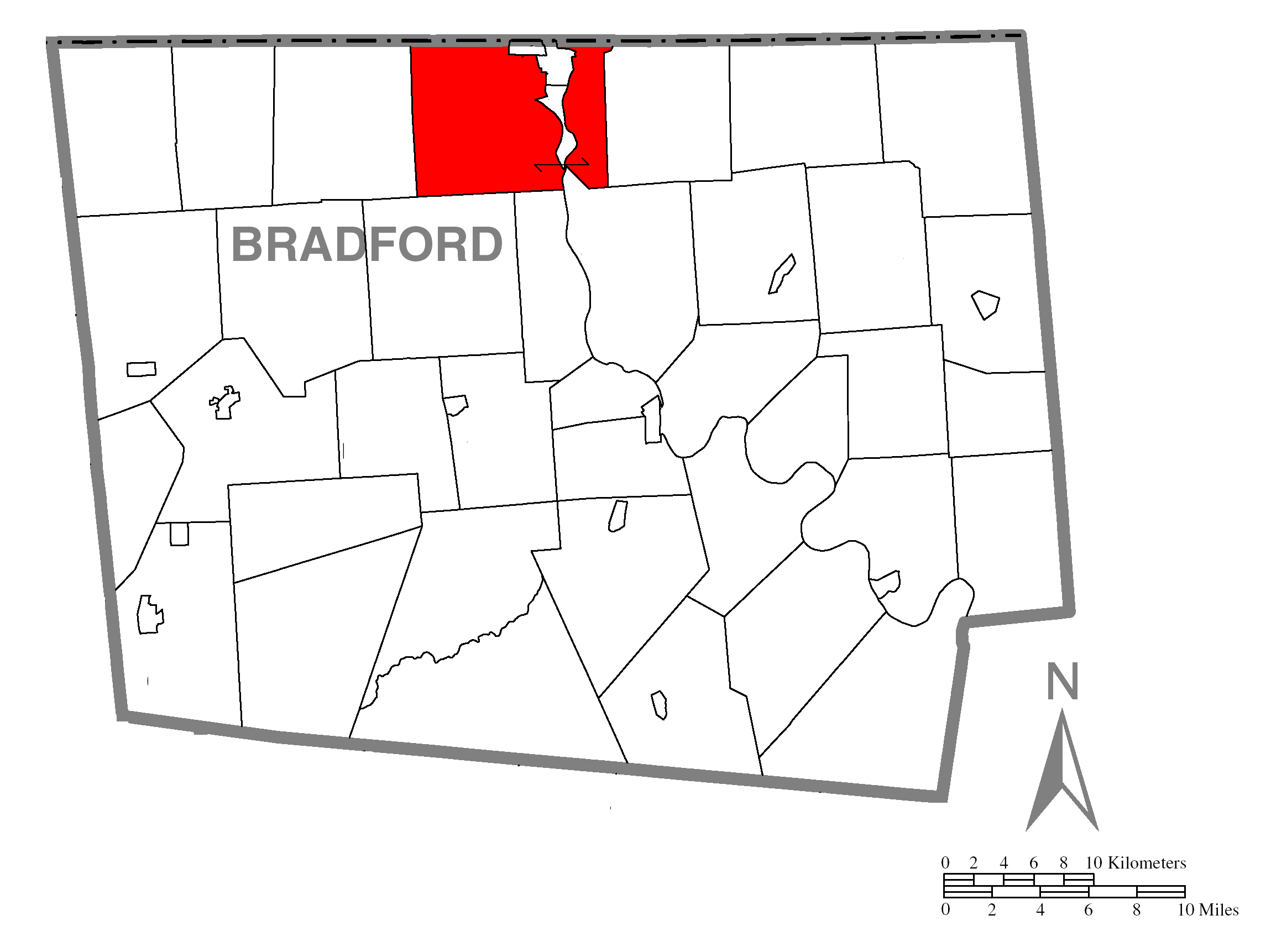
- Map of Bradford County with Athens Township highlighted

- Map of Bradford County, Pennsylvania
- Country: United States
- State: Pennsylvania
- County: Bradford
- Settled: 1783
- Incorporated: 1797

Area
  - Total: 45.02 sq mi (116.60 km^{2})
  - Land: 43.58 sq mi (112.86 km^{2})
  - Water: 1.44 sq mi (3.74 km^{2})

Population (2020)
  - Total: 5,192 ▼
  - Estimate (2023): 5,129
  - Density: 115.7/sq mi (44.68/km^{2})
- FIPS code: 42-015-03400
- Website: www.athenstownship.org

Athens Township is a township in Bradford County, Pennsylvania, United States. It is part of Northeastern Pennsylvania. The population was 5,192 at the 2020 census. It contains the census-designated place of Greens Landing.

== History ==
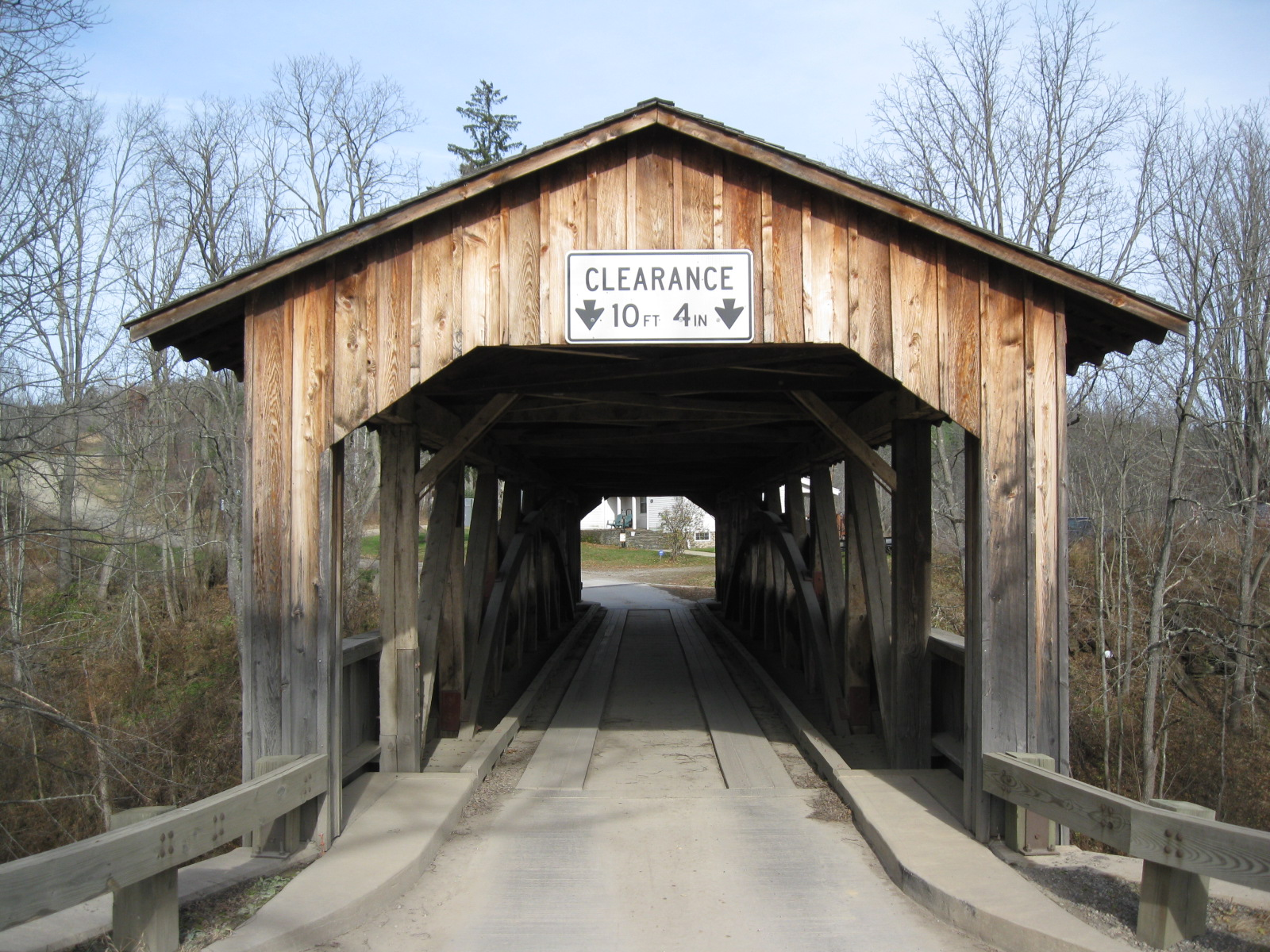
Knapps Covered Bridge in Athens Township is on the National Register of Historic Places in Pennsylvania

The Bridge in Athens Township was added to the National Register of Historic Places in 1988. It was replaced in 2005 and stricken from the Register in 2012.

== Geography ==
Athens Township is located in northern Bradford County, along the New York state line. The Susquehanna and Chemung rivers flow into the township from New York and join near the southern border of the township.

Athens Township is bordered by Litchfield Township to the east, Sheshequin, Ulster and Smithfield townships to the south, and Ridgebury Township to the west. To the northwest is the town of Chemung in Chemung County, New York, and to the northeast is the town of Barton in Tioga County, New York, including the village of Waverly. Athens Township borders the boroughs of South Waverly, Sayre and Athens in the center part of the township between the Susquehanna and Chemung rivers.

U.S. Route 220 passes through the township, leading north across the Chemung River into Athens borough and thence to its terminus at the New York line, and leading south towards Towanda, the Bradford County seat. Pennsylvania Route 199 leads from US-220 across the Chemung River also into Athens borough.

According to the U.S. Census Bureau, Athens Township has a total area of 45.0 square miles (116.6 km^{2}), of which 43.6 square miles (112.9 km^{2}) is land and 1.4 square miles (3.7 km^{2}), or 3.21%, is water.

== Demographics ==
Historical population
Census	Pop.	Note	%±
2010	5,251		—
2020	5,192		−1.1%
2023 (est.)	5,129		−1.2%
U.S. Decennial Census

As of the census of 2000, there were 5,058 people, 2,002 households, and 1,449 families residing in the township. The population density was 115.5 inhabitants per square mile (44.6/km^{2}). There were 2,189 housing units at an average density of 50.0 per square mile (19.3/km^{2}). The racial makeup of the township was 96.90% White, 0.40% African American, 0.16% Native American, 1.58% Asian, 0.32% from other races, and 0.65% from two or more races. Hispanic or Latino of any race were 0.67% of the population.

There were 2,002 households, out of which 33.0% had children under the age of 18 living with them, 58.7% were married couples living together, 8.7% had a female householder with no husband present, and 27.6% were non-families. 23.4% of all households were made up of individuals, and 11.1% had someone living alone who was 65 years of age or older. The average household size was 2.51 and the average family size was 2.94.

In the township the population was spread out, with 26.6% under the age of 18, 5.9% from 18 to 24, 26.2% from 25 to 44, 26.5% from 45 to 64, and 14.9% who were 65 years of age or older. The median age was 40 years. For every 100 females, there were 91.9 males. For every 100 females age 18 and over, there were 89.5 males.

The median income for a household in the township was $35,425, and the median income for a family was $45,781. Males had a median income of $32,969 versus $23,594 for females. The per capita income for the township was $18,936. About 10.5% of families and 14.2% of the population were below the poverty line, including 19.4% of those under age 18 and 6.1% of those age 65 or over.
