= Ethan B. Minier =

American politician

Ethan B. Minier (September 1, 1874 – December 29, 1958) was an American farmer, teacher, lawyer, and politician.

Born in Ulster, Pennsylvania, Minier moved with his parents in 1887 to a farm near New Richmond, Wisconsin. Minier taught school and then graduated from the University of Minnesota Law School. He practiced law in Amery, Wisconsin and was also had a farm near New Richmond, Wisconsin. From 1924 to 1927, Minier served in the Wisconsin State Assembly and was a Republican. Minier died in New Richmond, Wisconsin at the age of 84 in 1958.
