= Berryton =

Berryton may refer to:

- Berryton, Georgia
- Berryton, Kansas

== See also ==
- Berrytown (disambiguation)
