= Greens Landing, Pennsylvania =

Unincorporated community in Pennsylvania, US

- Census-designated place
- Location within Pennsylvania Location within the United States
- Coordinates: 41°55′52″N 76°32′25″W
- Country: United States
- State: Pennsylvania
- County: Bradford
- Township: Athens

Area
  - Total: 2.75 sq mi (7.12 km^{2})
  - Land: 2.68 sq mi (6.94 km^{2})
  - Water: 0.069 sq mi (0.18 km^{2})
- Elevation: 846 ft (258 m)

Population (2020)
  - Total: 898
  - Density: 335.2/sq mi (129.44/km^{2})
- Time zone: UTC-5 (Eastern (EST))
  - Summer (DST): UTC-4 (EDT)
- FIPS code: 42-31208
- GNIS feature ID: 2634232

Greens Landing is a census-designated place in Athens Township, Bradford County, Pennsylvania, United States. It is part of Northeastern Pennsylvania and is located along US Route 220 approximately five miles south of the borough of Athens. As of the 2010 census, the population of Greens Landing was 894 residents.

Historical population
Census	Pop.	Note	%±
2020	898		—
U.S. Decennial Census
