= Northeast Bradford School District =

School district in Pennsylvania, USA

Address
- 526 Panther Lane Rome, Bradford County, Pennsylvania, 18837; United States

District information
- Type: Public
- Established: 1959

Students and staff
- District mascot: Panther
- Colors: Maroon and Gray

Other information
- Website: https://www.nebpanthers.com/

The Northeast Bradford School District is small, rural public school district located in Rome, Pennsylvania, in the hills of northeast Bradford County. The Northeast Bradford School District operates the Northeast Bradford Jr/Sr High School and the Northeast Bradford Elementary School. Northeast Bradford School District encompasses approximately 169 square miles (440 km^{2}). According to 2004 local census data, it served a resident population of 5,223. In 2009, the district residents’ per capita income was $16,169, while the median family income was $41,580. In the Commonwealth, the median family income was $49,501 and the United States median family income was $49,445, in 2010. Northeast Bradford uses BLaST Intermediate Unit #17 for various student and professional services.

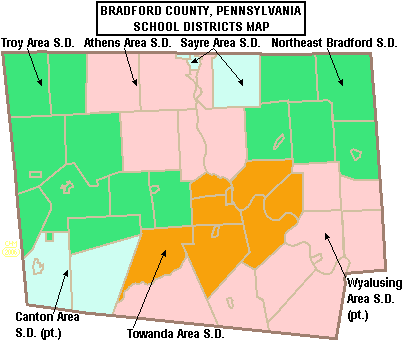
Map of Bradford County, Pennsylvania School Districts

== Extracurriculars ==
The district offers a variety of clubs, activities and sports.

=== Sports at Northeast Bradford ===
Northeast Bradford has a well-developed sports program with Varsity sports, including: Boys Soccer
Girls Soccer
Boys Cross Country
Girls Cross Country
Girls Volleyball
Boys Basketball
Girls Basketball
Wrestling
Varsity Cheer Leading for both Basketball and Wrestling.
Track & Field
Baseball
Softball
Marching Band

- The NEB Cross Country team went undefeated in the Northern Tier League for 4 years, spanning from 2001 to 2005
- The NEB Boys Cross Country team won the 2012 PIAA single A team championship at Hershey PA.
- The NEB Marching Band and Color Guard won first in the 2015-2016 Binghamton parade.
- The NEB 2025 Softball team was PIAA 1A state runner-up in Softball

=== Extracurricular activities ===
Northeast Bradford has a quality, but recently limited variety of extracurricular activities other than sports for students to choose from.

- Student Government Association
- National Honor Society
- Students Against Destructive Decisions (S.A.D.D.)
- Concert Band
- Jazz Band
- Future Farmers of America
- Friends of Rachel (F.O.R)
- Friends of Coy (F.O.C)

=== The Marching Band ===
The Northeast Marching Band has performed in many parades over the years and have won many of awards including first place at the Binghamton Parade. They have also performed in the Calvacade of Bands.
