= Ada Bittenbender =

American lawyer (1848–1925)

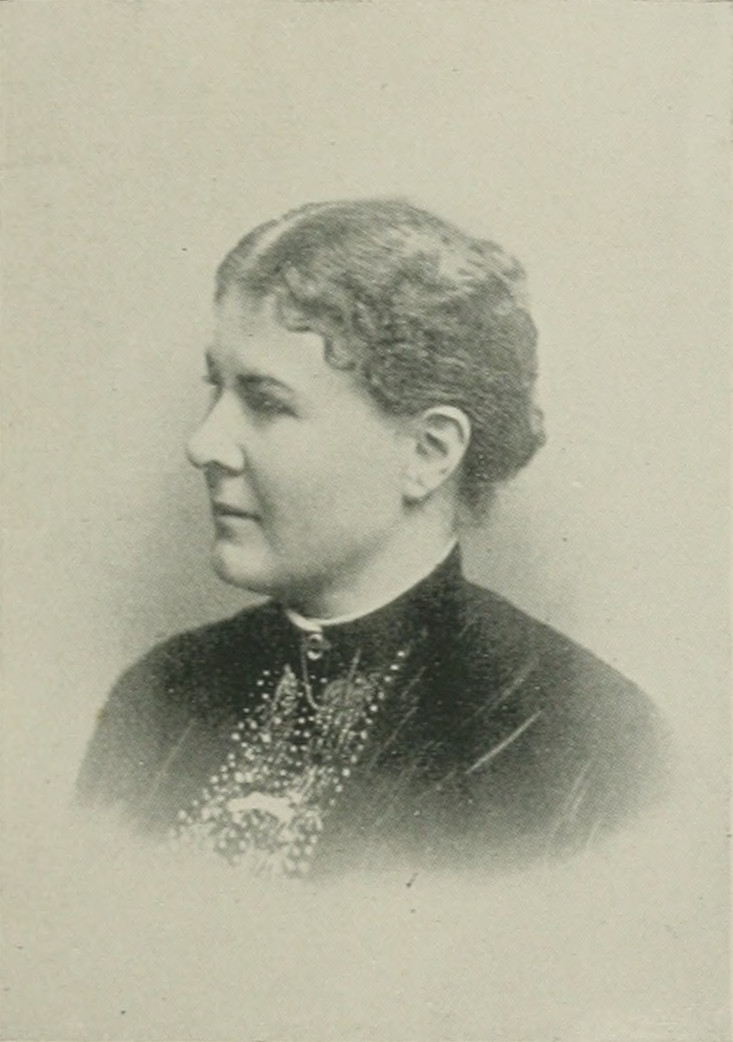
- Portrait from A Woman of the Century
- Born: Ada Matilda Cole; August 3, 1848; Asylum Township, Pennsylvania
- Died: December 15, 1925 (aged 77); Lincoln, Nebraska
- Education: Pennsylvania State Normal School
- Occupation: Lawyer
- Movement: Women's Suffrage movement Temperance movement

Ada Matilda Cole Bittenbender (August 3, 1848 – December 15, 1925) was an American lawyer and feminist activist. She became the first woman admitted to practice before the Nebraska Supreme Court and the third woman admitted to practice before the U.S. Supreme Court.

== Early life ==
Ada Matilda Cole was born in Asylum Township, Pennsylvania on August 3, 1848. Her father was Daniel Cole, an inventor, and her mother was Emily A. Madison. She graduated from Lowell's Commercial College in Binghamton, New York in 1869 and from the Pennsylvania State Normal School at Bloomsburg in 1875. After teaching for one year, she attended the Froebel Normal Institute in Washington, D.C. from 1876 to 1877. After graduation, she worked as principal of the Pennsylvania State Normal School for a year before resigning for health reasons.

On August 9, 1878, she married lawyer Henry Clay Bittenbender, a Princeton College graduate. After marrying, the couple moved to Osceola, Nebraska. While studying law, she began editing the Record, the only paper in Polk county. She later edited Nebraska's first Farmers' Alliance paper, which was dedicated to temperance, morality, and Republican politics. The Bittenbenders also reorganized the Polk County Agricultural Association, where Ada Bittenbender served as secretary, treasurer, orator, and the 1881 representative at the annual meeting of the State Board of Agriculture, the first woman to fill this role.

When the Nebraska Woman Suffrage Association was organized in 1881, Bittenbender was elected recording secretary, and she worked with others to secure the submission of a woman's suffrage amendment to the state constitution in 1881. At the first suffrage convention following the submission, she was made one of the three woman campaign speakers, and at the next she was elected president.

== Career ==
In 1882, Bittenbender passed the Nebraska bar examination, and became the first woman admitted to the bar in Nebraska. Along with her husband, she became a partner in the law firm H.C. & Ada M. Bittenbender, which they established in Lincoln in December 1882.

Bittenbender was described as a very successful lawyer, and won every case she brought before the Nebraska Supreme Court. She was admitted to the United States District and Circuit courts of Nebraska. While practicing law, Bittenbender worked as a legislative advocate. She worked for passage of a scientific temperance instruction bill, a bill restricting tobacco sales to minors, and a law giving a mother equal guardian status as the father. She also helped establish a home for women and girls as well as an industrial school, both established by the Nebraska legislature.

In 1888, at the International Council of Women held in Washington, D.C., she addressed the council with a speech entitled "Women in the Law." She also represented the Woman's Christian Temperance Union in Washington, D.C., for many years, eventually becoming its national attorney and advocating for legislative reform on temperance and the advancement and protection of women. In that position, she drafted The National Prohibitory Amendment Guide, a document promoting a federal amendment on prohibition.

In 1888, Bittenbender was admitted to practice in the Supreme Court of the United States and was elected to the International Woman's Christian Temperance Union. In 1891, Bittenbender was nominated for Judge of the Supreme Court of Nebraska.

Bittenbender authored a chapter on "Women in Law" in Woman's Work in America in 1891. She also wrote a book titled Tedos and Tisod: A Temperance Story.

== Later life ==
In her later years, Bittenbender retired from law and devoted herself to philosophical studies. She died at her sister's home in Lincoln on December 15, 1925.

== See also ==
- List of first women lawyers and judges in Nevada
