= Berrytown, Pennsylvania =

Unincorporated community in Pennsylvania, US

Berrytown is an unincorporated community in Bradford County, Pennsylvania, United States. It is part of Northeastern Pennsylvania. Its elevation is 1572 ft (479 m), and it is located at 41°53′24″N 76°46′01″W.
