= Monroe Township, Bradford County, Pennsylvania =

Township in Pennsylvania, US

Coordinates: 41°37′N 76°29′W

- Township
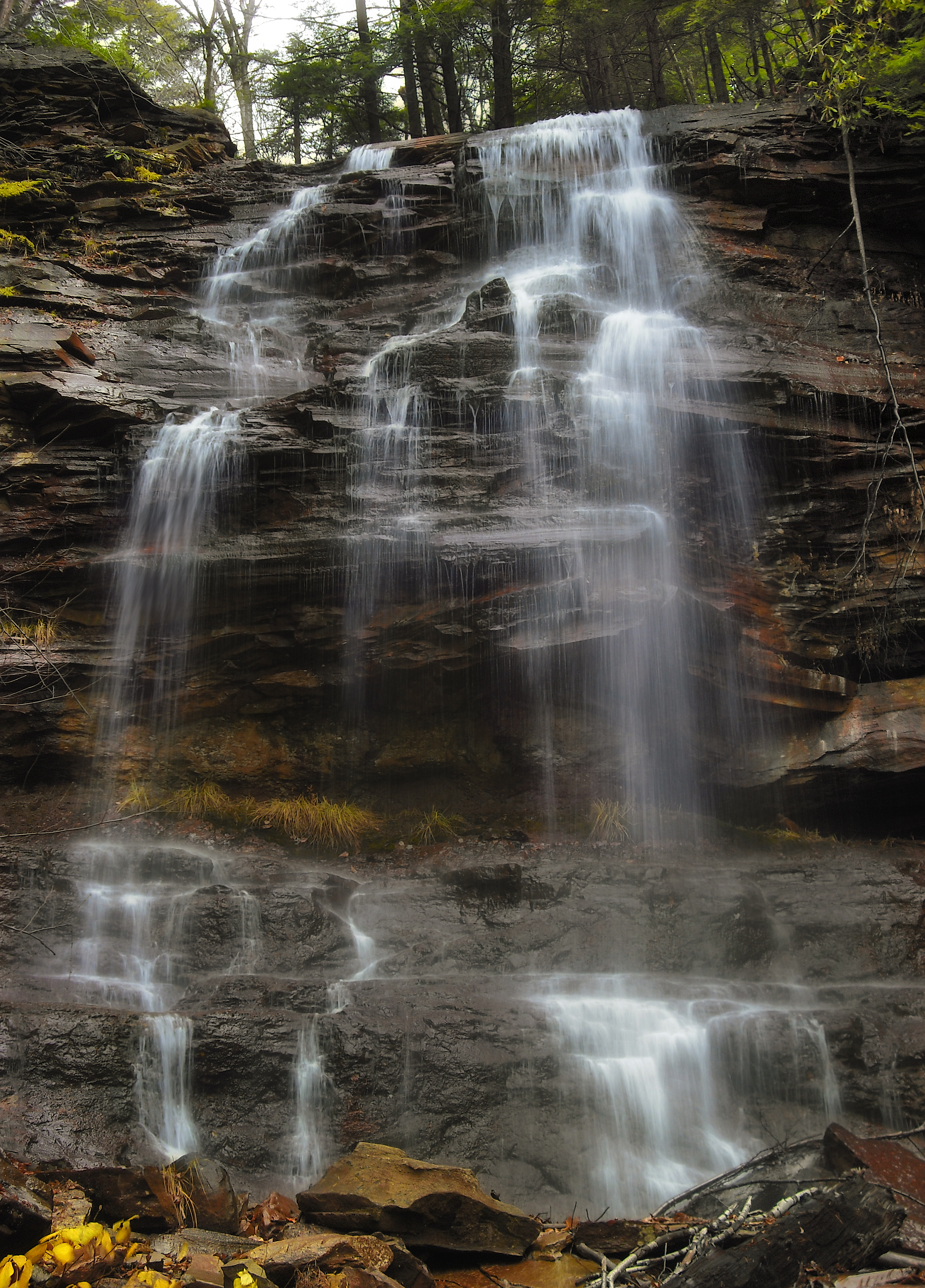
- Falls Creek waterfall in Monroe Township

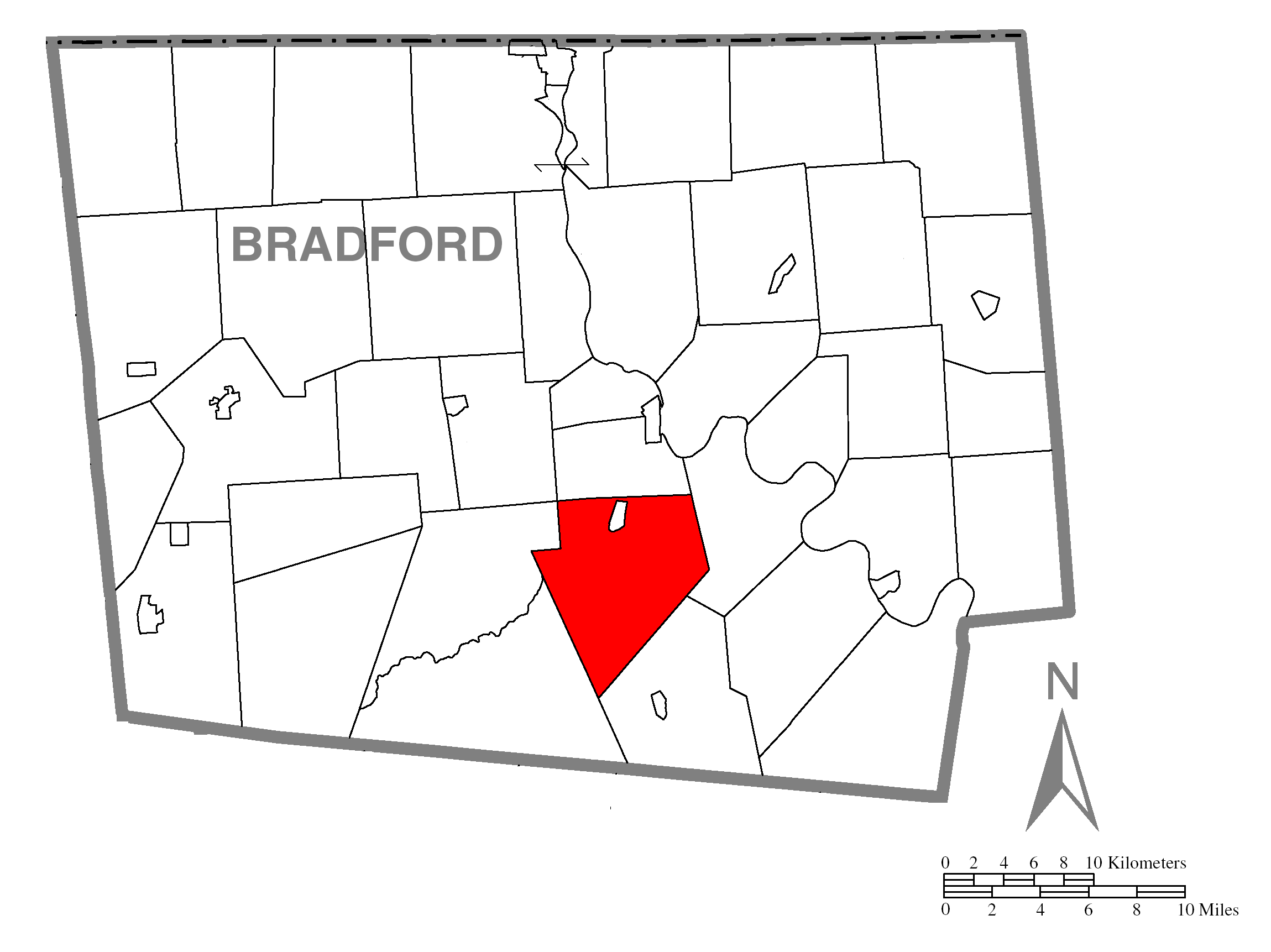
- Map of Bradford County with Monroe Township highlighted

- Map of Bradford County, Pennsylvania
- Country: United States
- State: Pennsylvania
- County: Bradford
- Settled: 1775
- Incorporated: 1821

Area
  - Total: 36.67 sq mi (94.97 km^{2})
  - Land: 36.51 sq mi (94.57 km^{2})
  - Water: 0.15 sq mi (0.39 km^{2})

Population (2020)
  - Total: 1,104 ▼
  - Estimate (2023): 1,090
  - Density: 33.2/sq mi (12.83/km^{2})
- FIPS code: 42-015-50440

Monroe Township is a township in Bradford County, Pennsylvania, United States. It is part of Northeastern Pennsylvania. The population was 1,104 at the 2020 census.

== Geography ==
Monroe Township is located in southern Bradford County, bordered by Towanda Township to the north, Asylum Township to the east, Albany Township to the southeast, Overton Township to the southwest, Franklin Township to the west, and Burlington Township touching the northwest corner. Monroe Township surrounds the borough of Monroe, commonly referred to as "Monroeton", but is separate from it.

Towanda Creek flows through the northern part of the township and through Monroeton, and is followed by Pennsylvania Route 414. The unincorporated community of Powell is located along PA 414 near the township's western border. U.S. Route 220 follows the South Branch of Towanda Creek from Monroeton south into Albany Township. According to the U.S. Census Bureau, the township has a total area of 36.7 square miles (95.0 km^{2}), of which 36.5 square miles (94.6 km^{2}) is land and 0.15 square miles (0.4 km^{2}), or 0.41%, is water.

== Demographics ==
Historical population
Census	Pop.	Note	%±
2010	1,250		—
2020	1,104		−11.7%
2023 (est.)	1,090		−1.3%
U.S. Decennial Census

As of the census of 2000, there were 1,271 people, 476 households, and 353 families residing in the township. The population density was 34.8 inhabitants per square mile (13.4/km^{2}). There were 586 housing units at an average density of 16.1/sq mi (6.2/km^{2}). The racial makeup of the township was 98.19% White, 0.08% African American, 0.71% Native American, and 1.02% from two or more races. Hispanic or Latino of any race were 0.31% of the population.

There were 476 households, out of which 35.1% had children under the age of 18 living with them, 57.8% were married couples living together, 8.4% had a female householder with no husband present, and 25.8% were non-families. 21.0% of all households were made up of individuals, and 6.9% had someone living alone who was 65 years of age or older. The average household size was 2.67 and the average family size was 3.09.

In the township the population was spread out, with 27.5% under the age of 18, 6.6% from 18 to 24, 30.8% from 25 to 44, 25.3% from 45 to 64, and 9.8% who were 65 years of age or older. The median age was 36 years. For every 100 females, there were 105.0 males. For every 100 females age 18 and over, there were 105.3 males.

The median income for a household in the township was $33,482, and the median income for a family was $35,833. Males had a median income of $28,864 versus $20,469 for females. The per capita income for the township was $14,353. About 15.0% of families and 15.9% of the population were below the poverty line, including 20.3% of those under age 18 and 7.7% of those age 65 or over.
