= Standing Stone Township, Pennsylvania =

Township in Pennsylvania, US

Coordinates: 41°44′30″N 76°21′59″W

- Township
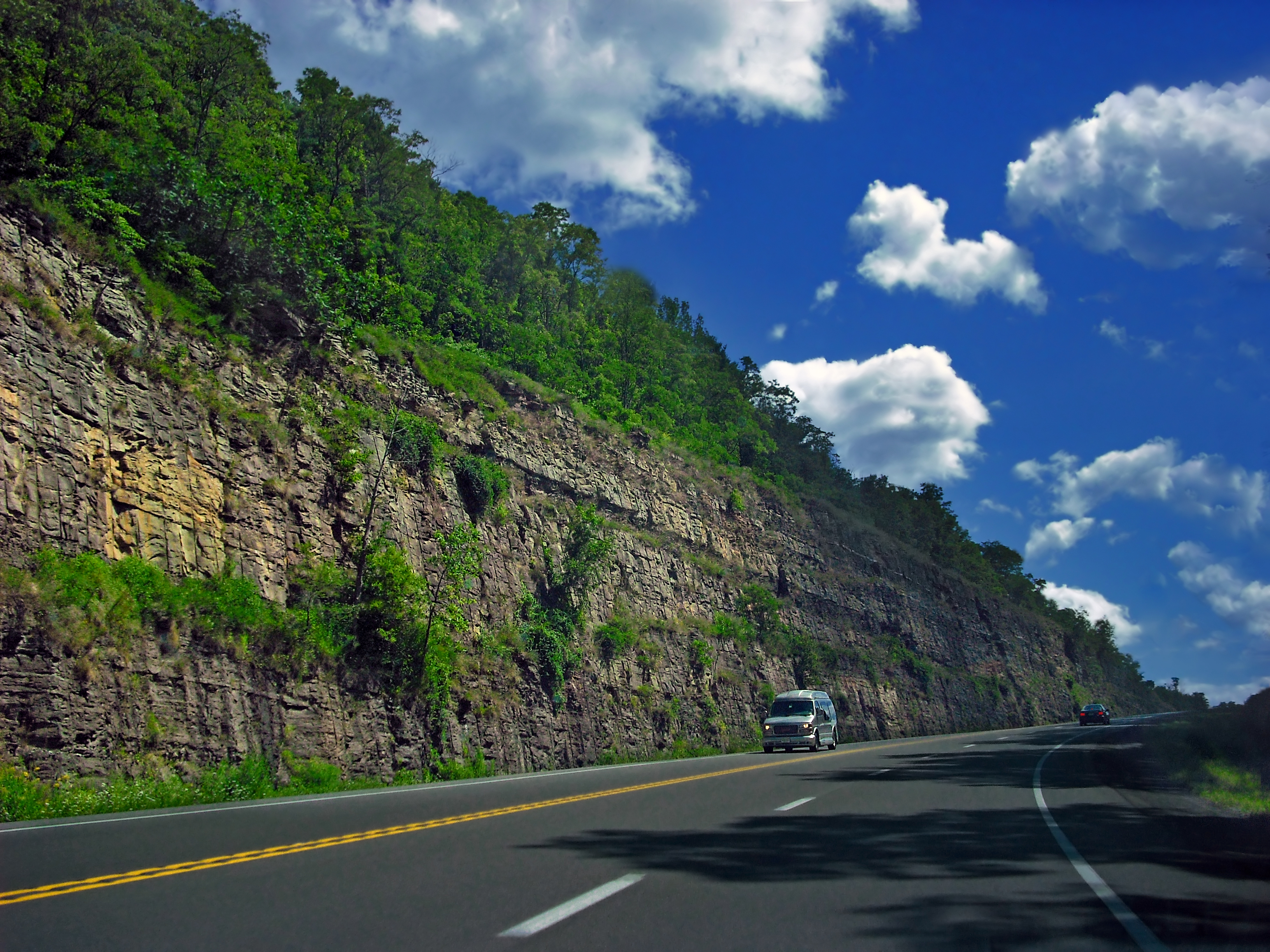
- The construction of U.S. Route 6 exposed geologic layers in Standing Stone Township.

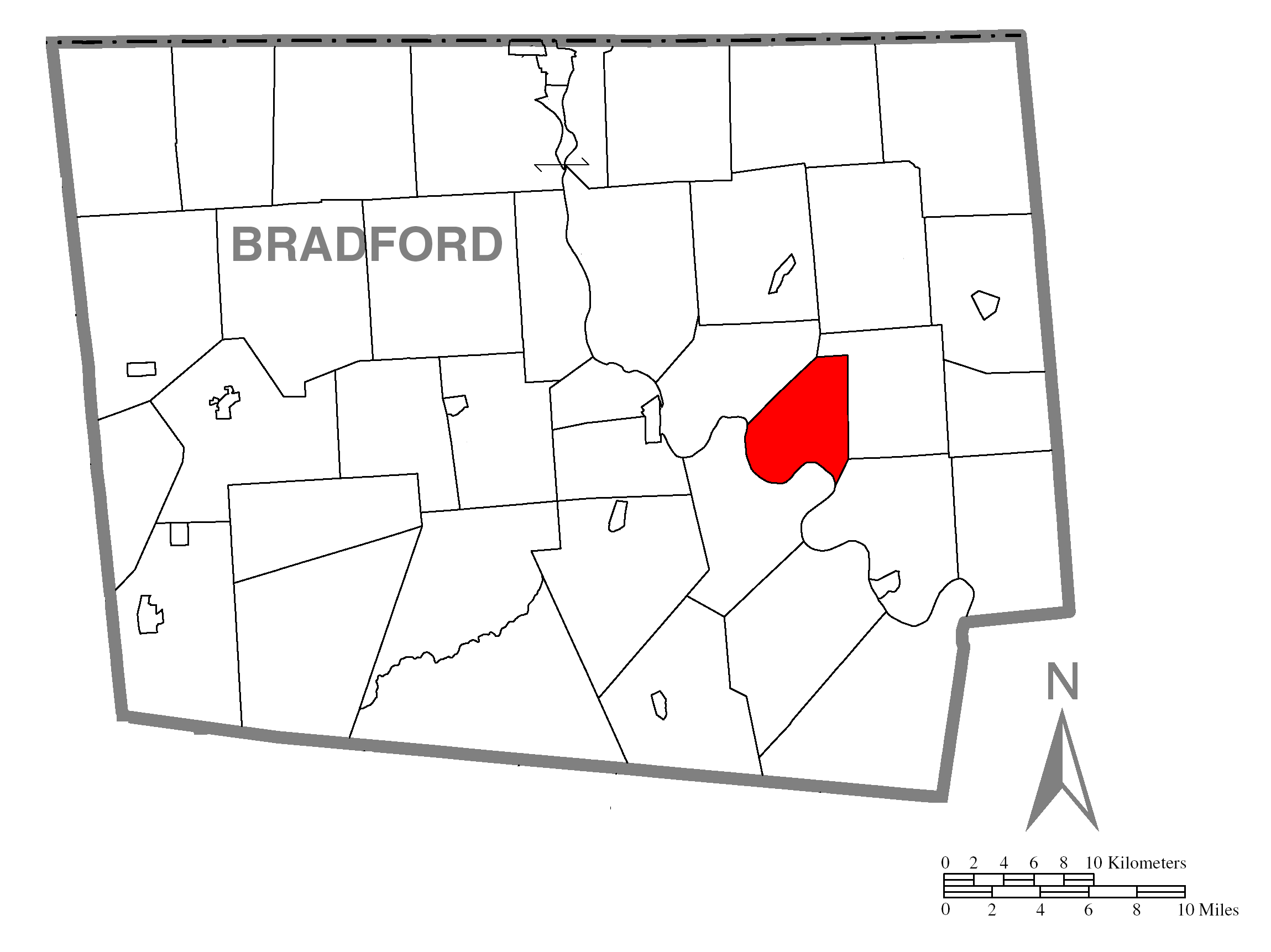
- Map of Bradford County with Standing Stone Township highlighted

- Map of Bradford County, Pennsylvania
- Country: United States
- State: Pennsylvania
- County: Bradford
- Settled: 1774
- Incorporated: 1841

Area
  - Total: 16.23 sq mi (42.04 km^{2})
  - Land: 15.68 sq mi (40.61 km^{2})
  - Water: 0.55 sq mi (1.42 km^{2})

Population (2010)
  - Total: 642
  - Estimate (2016): 643
  - Density: 41.0/sq mi (15.83/km^{2})
- FIPS code: 42-015-73632

Standing Stone Township is a township in Bradford County, Pennsylvania, United States. The population was 642 at the 2010 census.

== Geography ==
Standing Stone Township is located in eastern Bradford County and is bordered by Herrick Township to the north and east and Wyalusing Township to the southeast. The Susquehanna River forms a winding border with Asylum Township to the south and west. Wysox Township is on the northwestern border of the township. U.S. Route 6 passes through the township, leading west to Towanda, the county seat, and southeast to Wyalusing.

According to the United States Census Bureau, the township has a total area of 16.2 square miles (42.0 km^{2}), of which 15.7 square miles (40.6 km^{2}) is land and 0.54 square miles (1.4 km^{2}), or 3.38%, is water.

== Demographics ==
Historical population
Census	Pop.	Note	%±
2010	642		—
2016 (est.)	643		0.2%
U.S. Decennial Census

As of the census of 2000, there were 596 people, 210 households, and 161 families residing in the township. The population density was 37.6 inhabitants per square mile (14.5/km^{2}). There were 268 housing units at an average density of 16.9/sq mi (6.5/km^{2}). The racial makeup of the township was 97.99% White, 0.50% African American, 0.67% Native American, 0.17% Asian, and 0.67% from two or more races. Hispanic or Latino of any race were 0.34% of the population.

There were 210 households, out of which 37.1% had children under the age of 18 living with them, 65.7% were married couples living together, 5.2% had a female householder with no husband present, and 23.3% were non-families. 18.1% of all households were made up of individuals, and 8.6% had someone living alone who was 65 years of age or older. The average household size was 2.84 and the average family size was 3.21.

In the township the population was spread out, with 28.0% under the age of 18, 7.9% from 18 to 24, 31.2% from 25 to 44, 20.3% from 45 to 64, and 12.6% who were 65 years of age or older. The median age was 36 years. For every 100 females, there were 104.8 males. For every 100 females age 18 and over, there were 101.4 males.

The median income for a household in the township was $42,000, and the median income for a family was $44,196. Males had a median income of $33,333 versus $20,375 for females. The per capita income for the township was $15,456. About 2.1% of families and 3.5% of the population were below the poverty line, including 4.6% of those under age 18 and 2.7% of those age 65 or over.
