= Berrytown, Virginia =

Unincorporated community in Virginia, US

Berrytown is an unincorporated community in Rockingham County, Virginia, United States. Its elevation is 1,010 ft (308 m), and it is located at 38°22′06″N 78°39′25″W.
