= Asylum Township, Pennsylvania =

Township in Pennsylvania, US

Coordinates: 41°43′17″N 76°22′57″W

- Township
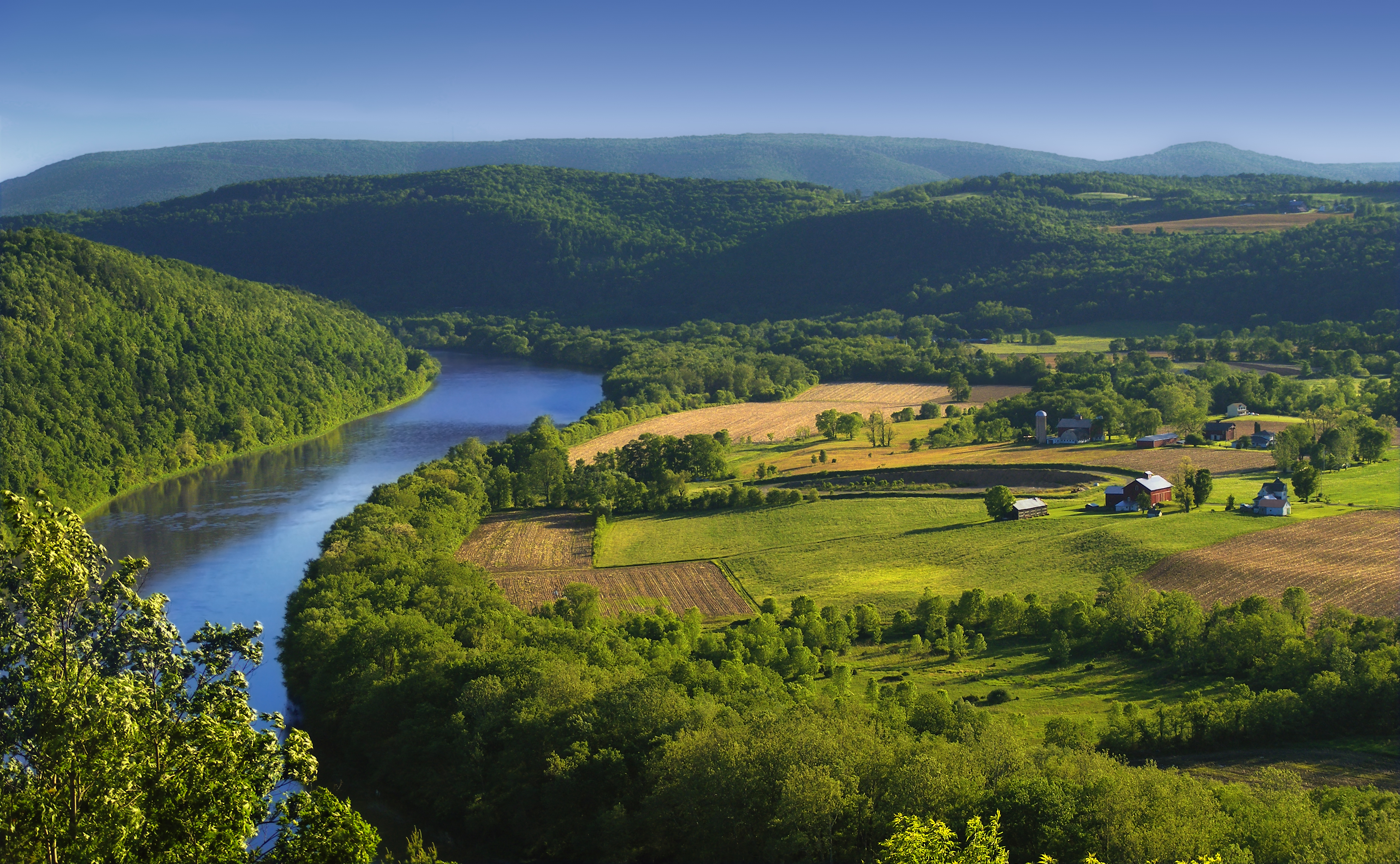
- The Susquehanna River near French Azilum

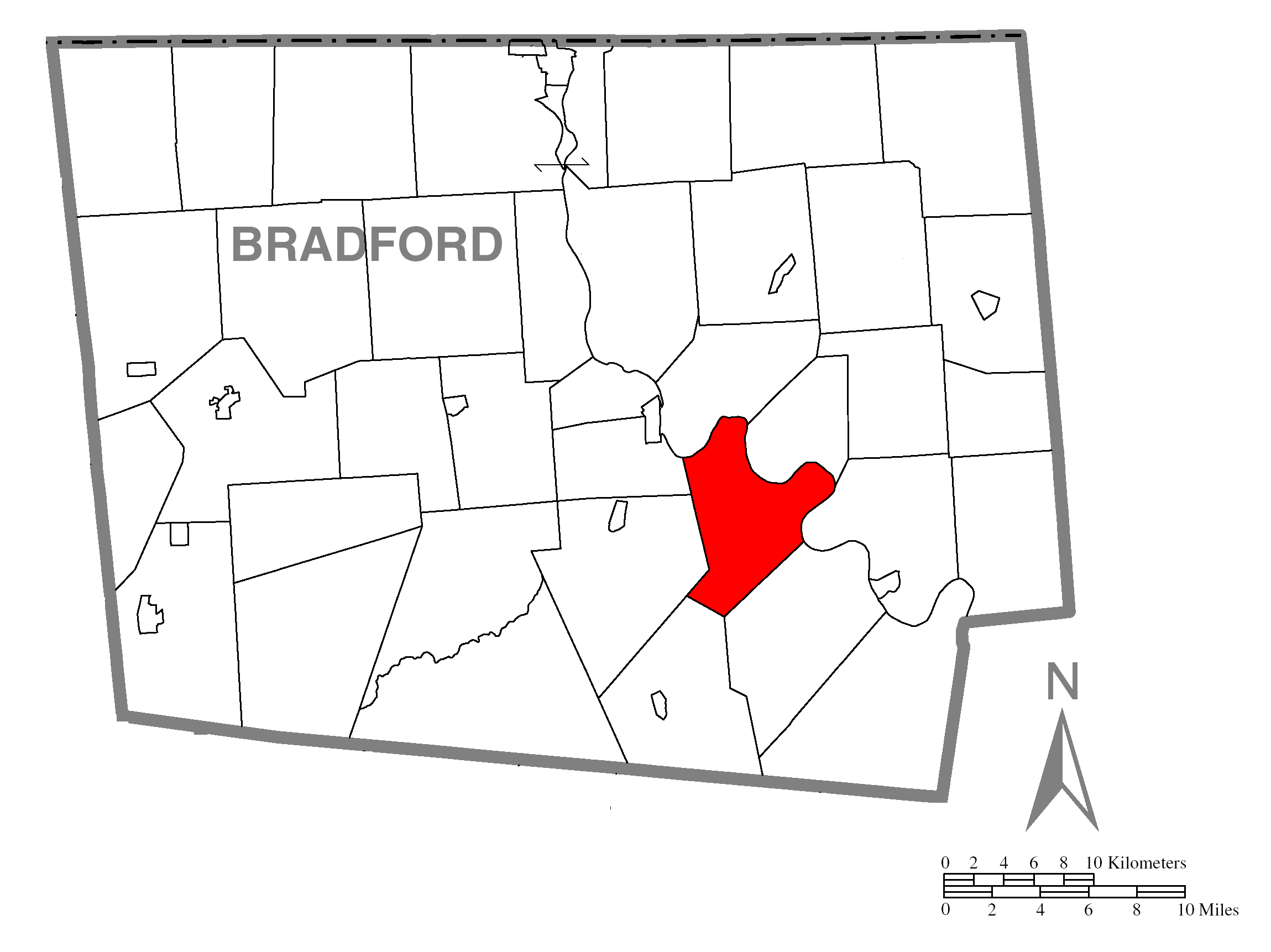
- Map of Bradford County with Asylum Township highlighted

- Map of Bradford County, Pennsylvania
- Country: United States
- State: Pennsylvania
- County: Bradford
- Settled: 1793
- Incorporated: 1814

Area
  - Total: 26.42 sq mi (68.42 km^{2})
  - Land: 25.33 sq mi (65.61 km^{2})
  - Water: 1.09 sq mi (2.82 km^{2})

Population (2020)
  - Total: 999 ▼
  - Estimate (2023): 1,007
  - Density: 41.4/sq mi (15.97/km^{2})
- FIPS code: 42-015-03360

Asylum Township is a township in Bradford County, Pennsylvania, United States. It is part of Northeastern Pennsylvania. The population was 999 at the 2020 census. The town contains the historic site of French Azilum.

== Geography ==
Asylum Township is located in southeastern Bradford County along the southwest side of the Susquehanna River. It is bordered by Terry Township to the southeast, Albany Township to the south, Monroe Township to the west, and Towanda Township to the northwest. Across the Susquehanna River are Wysox Township to the north, Standing Stone Township to the northeast, and Wyalusing Township to the east. There is a crossing of the Susquehanna at Asylum Township's northern end, where Pennsylvania Route 187 crosses from the unincorporated community of Macedonia into the unincorporated community of Wysox.

According to the U.S. Census Bureau, Asylum Township has a total area of 26.4 square miles (68.4 km^{2}), of which 25.3 square miles (65.6 km^{2}) is land and 1.1 square miles (2.8 km^{2}), or 4.12%, is water.

== History ==
After the Haitian Revolution in 1791, French aristocrats moved from Haiti to the town, and stayed there until Napoleon let them back in France in the early 1800s.

== Demographics ==
Historical population
Census	Pop.	Note	%±
2010	1,058		—
2020	999		−5.6%
2023 (est.)	1,007		0.8%
U.S. Decennial Census

As of the census of 2000, there were 1,097 people, 417 households, and 319 families residing in the township. The population density was 42.8 inhabitants per square mile (16.5/km^{2}). There were 501 housing units at an average density of 19.6/sq mi (7.6/km^{2}). The racial makeup of the township was 98.09% White, 0.18% Native American, 0.55% Asian, 0.55% from other races, and 0.64% from two or more races. Hispanic or Latino of any race were 0.55% of the population.

There were 417 households, out of which 32.4% had children under the age of 18 living with them, 63.3% were married couples living together, 7.2% had a female householder with no husband present, and 23.5% were non-families. 18.9% of all households were made up of individuals, and 7.4% had someone living alone who was 65 years of age or older. The average household size was 2.63 and the average family size was 2.97.

In the township the population was spread out, with 25.6% under the age of 18, 7.2% from 18 to 24, 27.0% from 25 to 44, 25.1% from 45 to 64, and 15.1% who were 65 years of age or older. The median age was 39 years. For every 100 females, there were 98.0 males. For every 100 females age 18 and over, there were 96.6 males.

The median income for a household in the township was $35,714, and the median income for a family was $40,000. Males had a median income of $30,658 versus $25,455 for females. The per capita income for the township was $17,102. About 7.1% of families and 8.2% of the population were below the poverty line, including 10.1% of those under age 18 and 11.1% of those age 65 or over.

== Notable people ==
- John Laporte (1798–1862), born in Asylum, congressman from Pennsylvania
- Ada Matilda (Cole) Bittenbender, born 1848 in Asylum, and by 1888 she was the first woman admitted to practice before the Supreme Court and the third woman admitted to the bar in Nebraska. She authored a chapter on 'Women in Law' in the book, 'Woman's Work in America' and was devoted to women's rights and protections.
