= Sugar Creek (Susquehanna River tributary) =

Creek in Pennsylvania, US

Coordinates: 41°47′59″N 76°27′35″W

Sugar Creek is a 32.0-mile-long (51.5 km) tributary of the Susquehanna River in Bradford County, Pennsylvania in the United States.

Sugar Creek joins the Susquehanna River near the borough of Towanda.

== See also ==
- List of rivers of Pennsylvania
