= North Towanda Township, Pennsylvania =

Township in Pennsylvania, US

Coordinates: 41°47′12″N 76°29′17″W

- Township
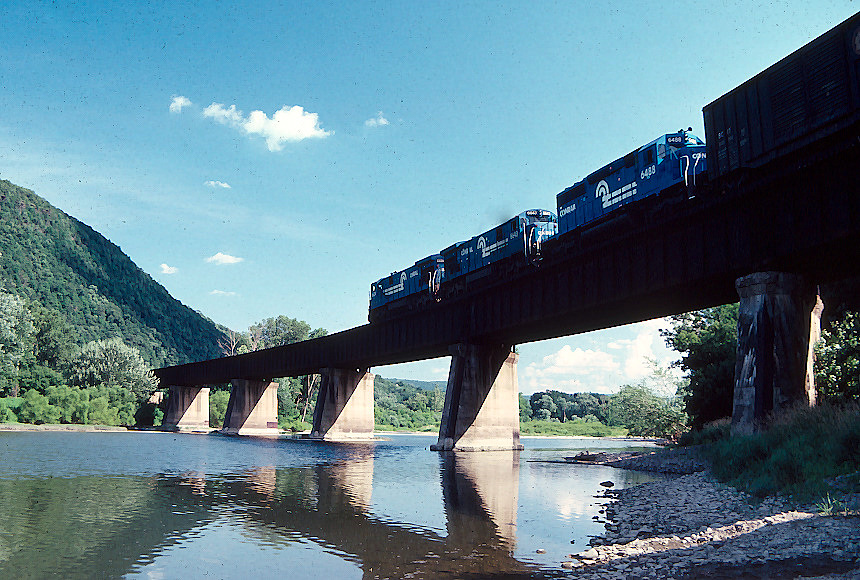
- Train crossing the Susquehanna River from North Towanda Township into Wysox Township

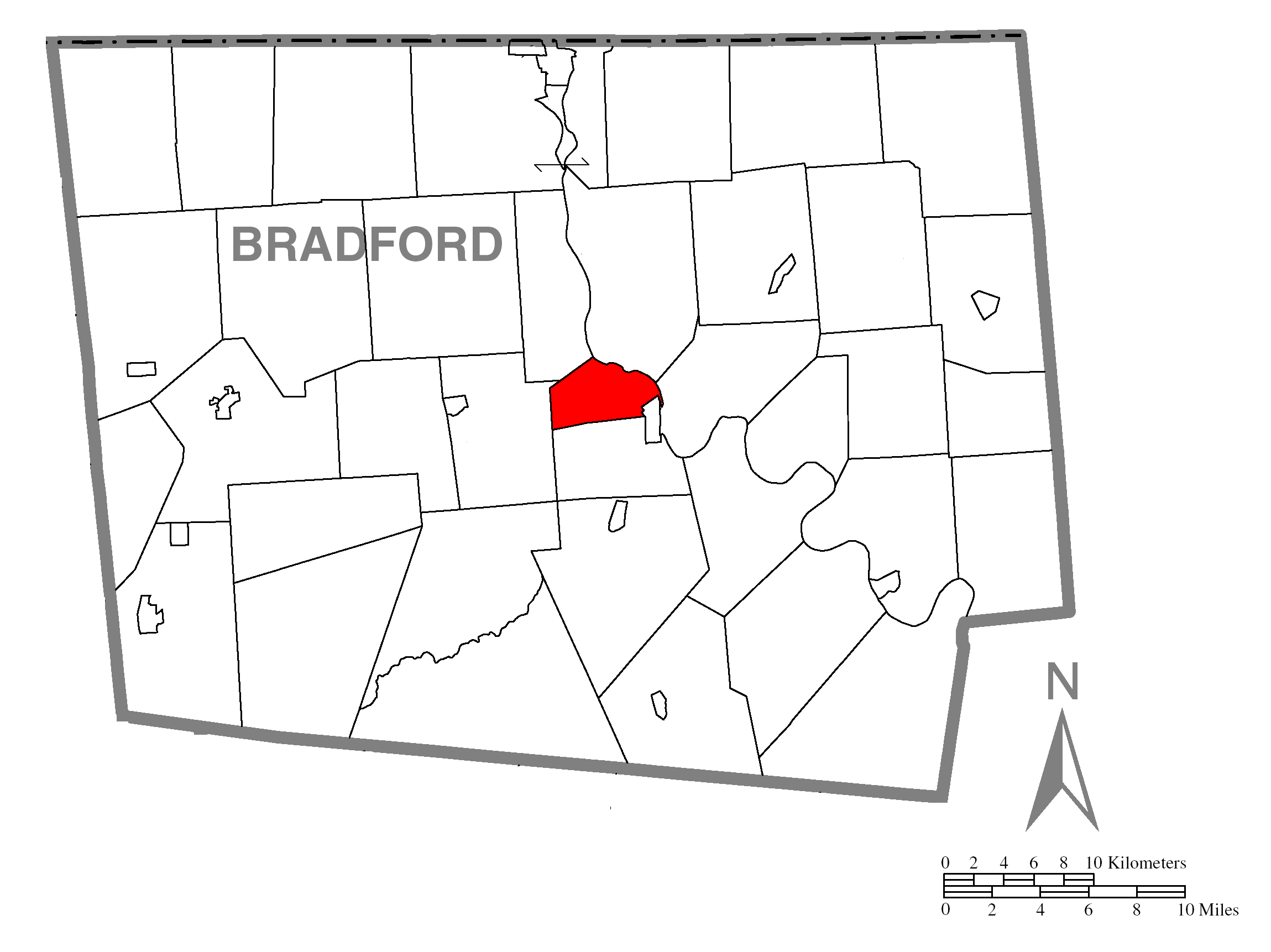
- Map of Bradford County with North Towanda Township highlighted

- Map of Bradford County, Pennsylvania
- Country: United States
- State: Pennsylvania
- County: Bradford
- Settled: 1785
- Incorporated: 1851

Area
  - Total: 8.96 sq mi (23.21 km^{2})
  - Land: 8.74 sq mi (22.63 km^{2})
  - Water: 0.23 sq mi (0.59 km^{2})

Population (2020)
  - Total: 1,055 ▼
  - Estimate (2023): 1,046
  - Density: 126.9/sq mi (49.01/km^{2})
- FIPS code: 42-015-55448
- Website: https://northtowandatownship.org/

North Towanda Township is a township in Bradford County, Pennsylvania, United States. It is part of Northeastern Pennsylvania. The population was 1,055 at the 2020 census.

== Geography ==
North Towanda Township is located near the center of Bradford County, on the southwest bank of the Susquehanna River. It is bordered by the borough of Towanda to the southeast, Towanda Township to the south, Burlington Township to the west, and Ulster Township to the northwest. Across the Susquehanna River, Sheshequin Township is to the northeast and Wysox Township is to the east.

U.S. Route 6 and U.S. Route 220 pass through the township, crossing at an interchange near the township center.

According to the United States Census Bureau, the township has a total area of 9.0 square miles (23.2 km^{2}), of which 8.7 square miles (22.6 km^{2}) is land and 0.23 square miles (0.6 km^{2}), or 2.52%, is water.

== Demographics ==
Historical population
Census	Pop.	Note	%±
2010	1,132		—
2020	1,055		−6.8%
2023 (est.)	1,046		−0.9%
U.S. Decennial Census

As of the census of 2000, there were 927 people, 402 households, and 244 families residing in the township. The population density was 104.7 inhabitants per square mile (40.4/km^{2}). There were 431 housing units at an average density of 48.7 per square mile (18.8/km^{2}). The racial makeup of the township was 98.17% White, 0.32% African American, 0.32% Native American, 0.43% Asian, and 0.76% from two or more races. Hispanic or Latino of any race were 0.54% of the population.

There were 402 households, out of which 24.6% had children under the age of 18 living with them, 53.7% were married couples living together, 4.5% had a female householder with no husband present, and 39.1% were non-families. 37.3% of all households were made up of individuals, and 26.9% had someone living alone who was 65 years of age or older. The average household size was 2.19 and the average family size was 2.86.

In the township the population was spread out, with 20.1% under the age of 18, 3.8% from 18 to 24, 19.1% from 25 to 44, 27.7% from 45 to 64, and 29.3% who were 65 years of age or older. The median age was 49 years. For every 100 females, there were 81.1 males. For every 100 females age 18 and over, there were 77.3 males.

The median income for a household in the township was $31,641, and the median income for a family was $53,375. Males had a median income of $38,125 versus $24,375 for females. The per capita income for the township was $22,494. About 7.8% of families and 12.4% of the population were below the poverty line, including 16.3% of those under age 18 and 15.1% of those age 65 or over.
