= Towanda Township, Pennsylvania =

Township in Pennsylvania, US

Coordinates: 41°44′30″N 76°30′05″W

- Township
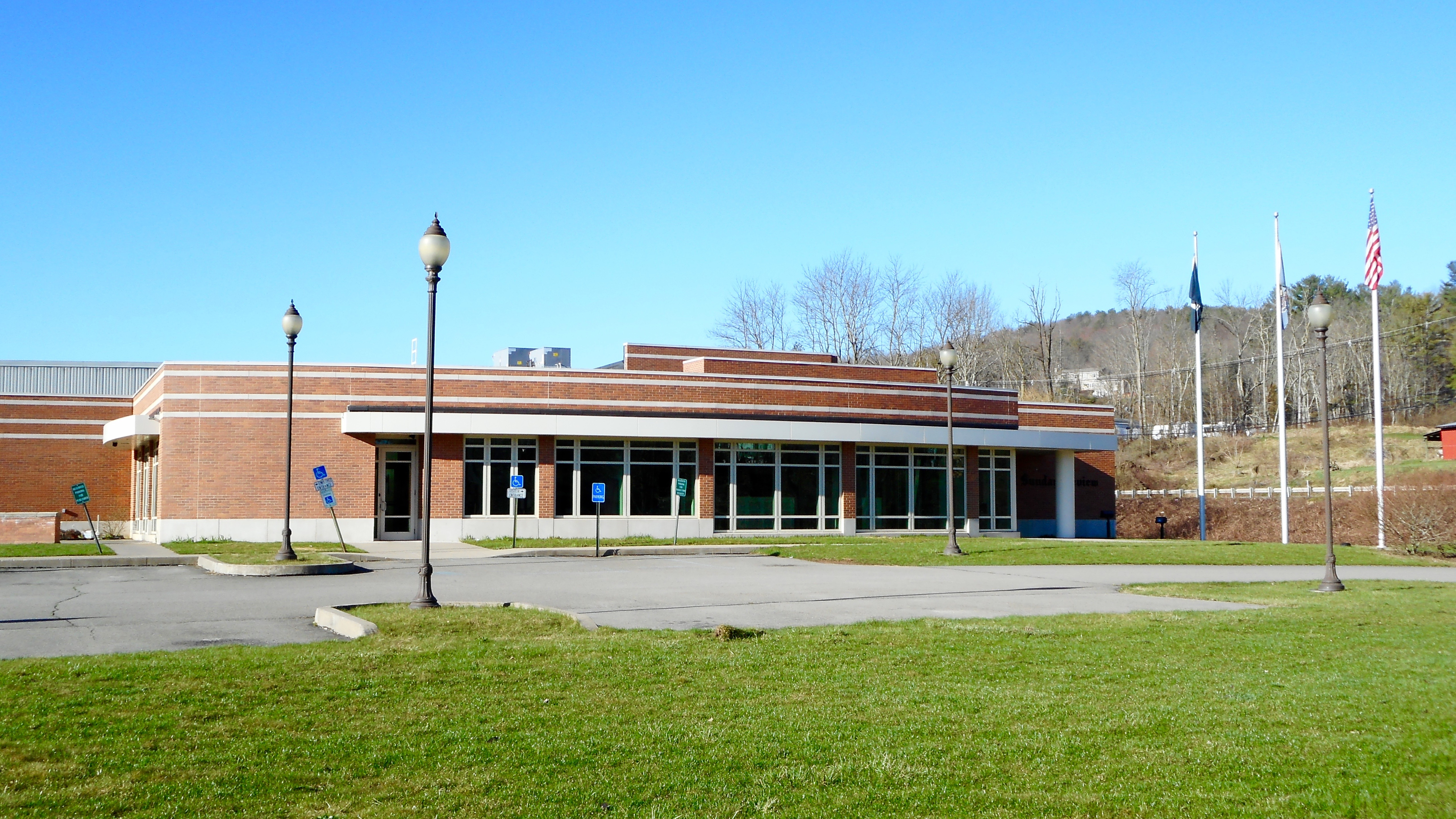
- Printing plant

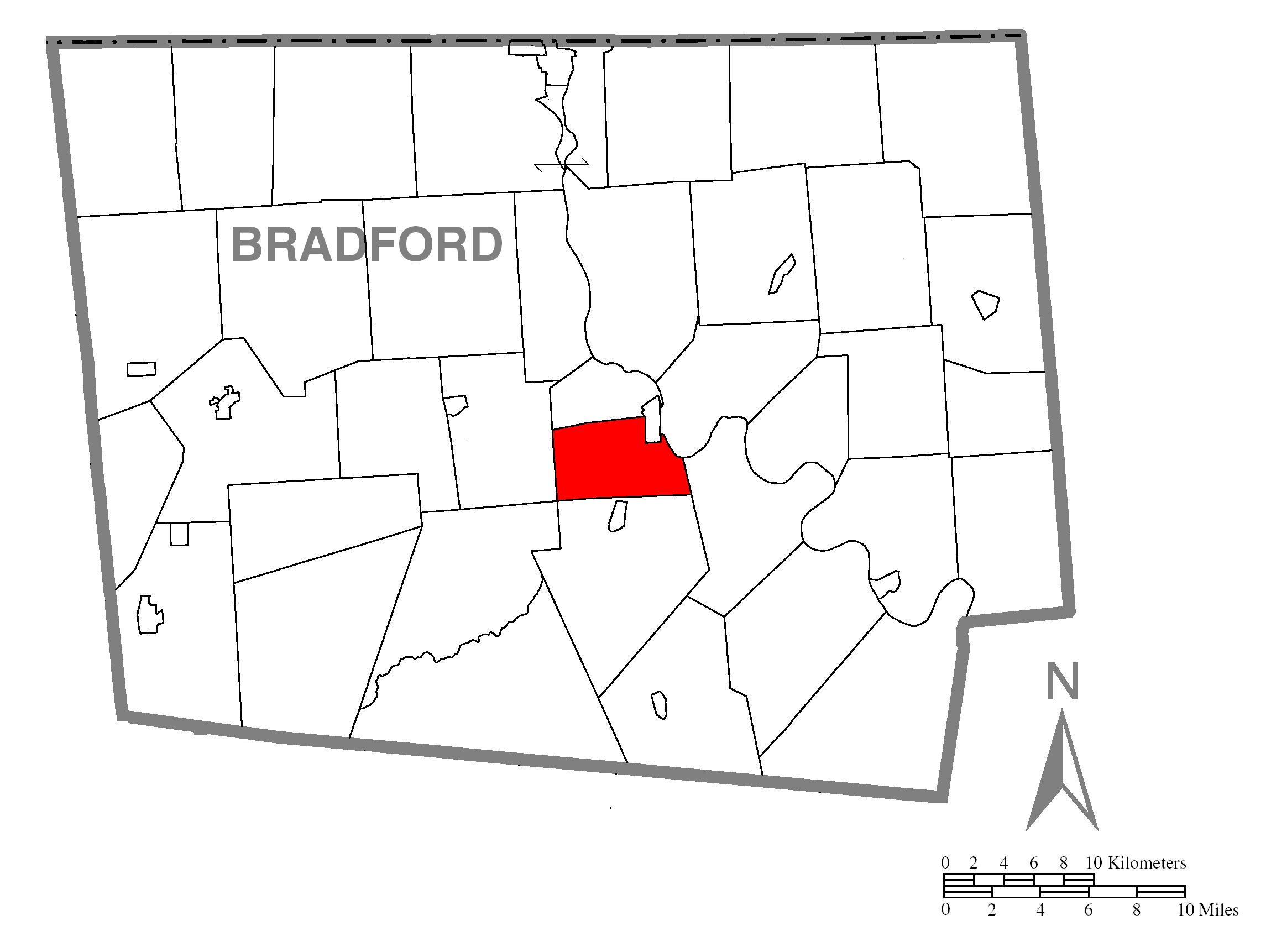
- Map of Bradford County with Towanda Township highlighted

- Map of Bradford County, Pennsylvania
- Country: United States
- State: Pennsylvania
- County: Bradford
- Settled: 1774
- Incorporated: 1790

Area
  - Total: 15.51 sq mi (40.17 km^{2})
  - Land: 15.23 sq mi (39.44 km^{2})
  - Water: 0.28 sq mi (0.73 km^{2})

Population (2010)
  - Total: 1,149
  - Estimate (2016): 1,117
  - Density: 73.3/sq mi (28.32/km^{2})
- Area code: 570
- FIPS code: 42-015-77176
- Website: towandatownship.org

Towanda Township is a township in Bradford County, Pennsylvania, United States. It is part of Northeastern Pennsylvania. The population was 1,149 at the 2010 census.

== Geography ==
Towanda Township is located near the center of Bradford County and is bordered by North Towanda Township to the north, the borough of Towanda to the east and north, Wysox Township to the northeast across the Susquehanna River, by Asylum Township to the east, by Monroe Township to the south, by Franklin Township at the southwestern corner, and by Burlington Township to the west.

U.S. Route 220 passes through the township, bypassing the borough of Towanda. The unincorporated community of South Towanda is in the township, just south of the borough.

According to the United States Census Bureau, the township has a total area of 15.5 square miles (40.2 km^{2}), of which 15.2 square miles (39.4 km^{2}) is land and 0.27 square miles (0.7 km^{2}), or 1.81%, is water.

== Demographics ==
Historical population
Census	Pop.	Note	%±
2010	1,149		—
2016 (est.)	1,117		−2.8%
U.S. Decennial Census

As of the census of 2000, there were 1,131 people, 432 households, and 329 families residing in the township. The population density was 74.5 inhabitants per square mile (28.8/km^{2}). There were 467 housing units at an average density of 30.7 per square mile (11.9/km^{2}). The racial makeup of the township was 98.94% White, 0.09% African American, 0.62% Native American, 0.09% Asian, 0.18% from other races, and 0.09% from two or more races. Hispanic or Latino of any race were 0.97% of the population.

There were 432 households, out of which 32.4% had children under the age of 18 living with them, 57.4% were married couples living together, 15.0% had a female householder with no husband present, and 23.8% were non-families. 17.8% of all households were made up of individuals, and 8.6% had someone living alone who was 65 years of age or older. The average household size was 2.59 and the average family size was 2.85.

In the township the population was spread out, with 25.4% under the age of 18, 6.5% from 18 to 24, 29.0% from 25 to 44, 25.0% from 45 to 64, and 14.1% who were 65 years of age or older. The median age was 39 years. For every 100 females, there were 98.4 males. For every 100 females age 18 and over, there were 91.0 males.

The median income for a household in the township was $36,326, and the median income for a family was $40,278. Males had a median income of $35,083 versus $23,264 for females. The per capita income for the township was $17,164. About 15.1% of families and 16.6% of the population were below the poverty line, including 24.0% of those under age 18 and 8.9% of those age 65 or over.
