= Bradford County, Pennsylvania =

County in Pennsylvania, United States

- County
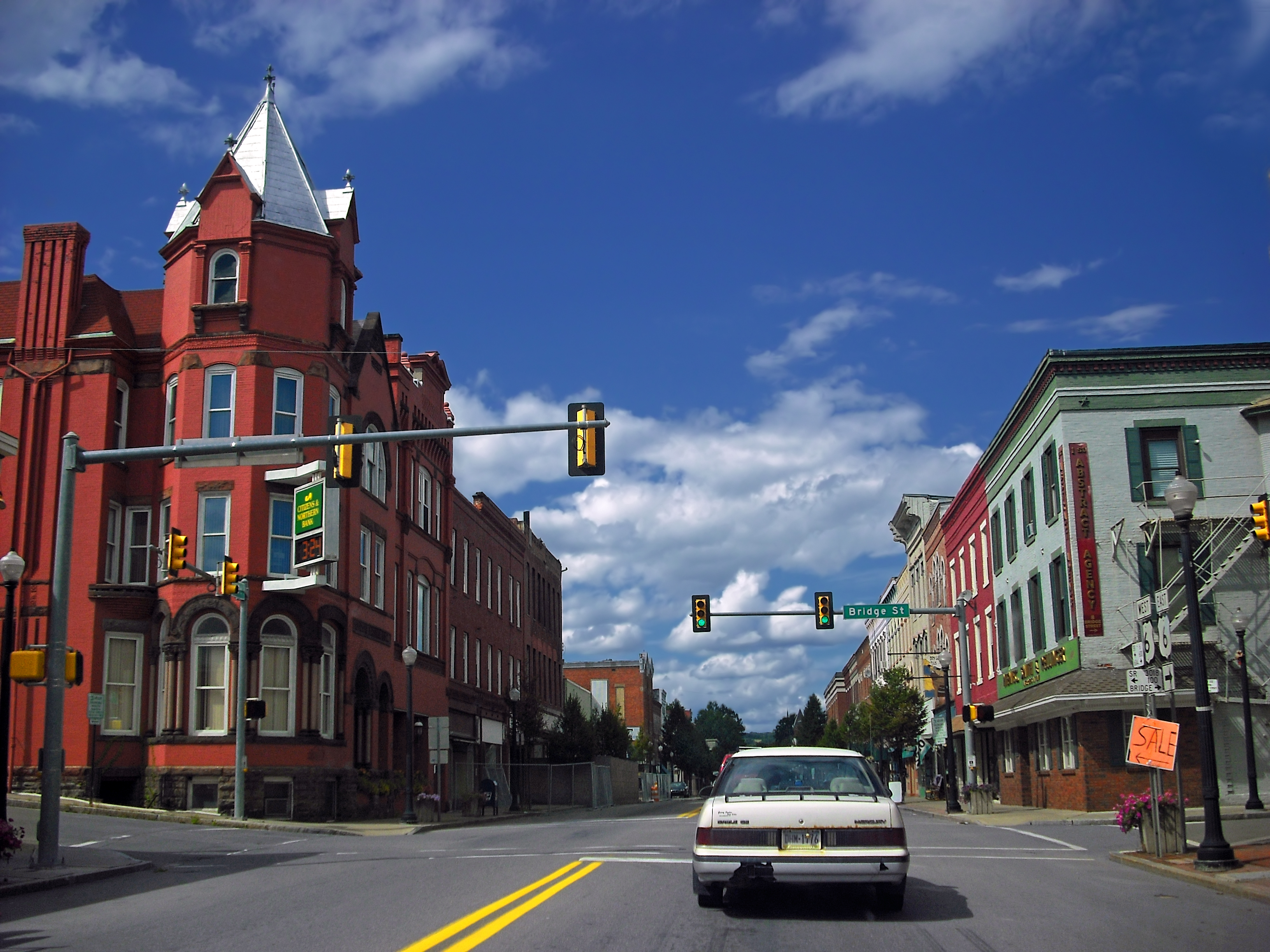
- Towanda is the county seat

- Seal Logo

- Location within the U.S. state of Pennsylvania
- Coordinates: 41°47′N 76°31′W
- Country: United States
- State: Pennsylvania
- Founded: February 21, 1810
- Named for: William Bradford
- Seat: Towanda
- Largest borough: Sayre

Area
  - Total: 1,161 sq mi (3,010 km^{2})
  - Land: 1,147 sq mi (2,970 km^{2})
  - Water: 14 sq mi (36 km^{2}) 1.2%

Population (2020)
  - Total: 59,967
  - Estimate (2025): 59,600 ▼
  - Density: 52/sq mi (20/km^{2})
- Congressional district: 9th
- Website: www.bradfordcountypa.gov

Pennsylvania Historical Marker
- Designated: July 10, 1982

Bradford County is a county in the Commonwealth of Pennsylvania. As of the 2020 census, its population was 59,967. Its county seat is Towanda. The county was created on February 21, 1810, from parts of Lycoming and Luzerne Counties. Originally called Ontario County, it was reorganized and separated from Lycoming County on October 13, 1812, and renamed Bradford County for William Bradford, who had been a chief justice of the Pennsylvania Supreme Court and United States Attorney General. The county is part of the Northeast region of the commonwealth. (Note: Includes Luzerne, Lackawanna, Monroe, Schuylkill, Carbon, Pike, Bradford, Wayne, Susquehanna, Wyoming and Sullivan Counties)

Bradford County comprises the Sayre, Pennsylvania micropolitan statistical area.

The county is not to be confused with the city of Bradford, which is in McKean County, 141 miles to the west via U.S. Route 6.

== History ==
As noted above, Bradford County was originally named Ontario County. The county was reorganized and renamed in 1812, but a section of north Philadelphia in which major east–west streets are named after Pennsylvania counties retains an Ontario Street, between Westmoreland and Tioga Streets. Two short Bradford Streets are in northeast Philadelphia, about 4 miles from Ontario Street.

Bradford County is the ancestral home of the Tehotitachsae indigenous people of North America. Their principal village, Gohontoto, was on the site of the present Borough of Wyalusing.

== Geography ==
According to the U.S. Census Bureau, the county has a total area of 1,161 square miles (3,010 km^{2}), of which 1,147 square miles (2,970 km^{2}) are land and 14 square miles (36 km^{2}) (1.2%) are covered by water. It is the second-largest county in Pennsylvania by land area and third-largest by total area.

=== Climate ===
Bradford has a warm-summer humid continental climate (Dfb) and average monthly temperatures in Towanda range from 24.5 °F in January to 70.6 °F in July.

=== Adjacent counties ===
- Chemung County, New York (northwest)
- Tioga County, New York (northeast)
- Susquehanna County (east)
- Wyoming County (southeast)
- Sullivan County (south)
- Lycoming County (southwest)
- Tioga County (west)

Bradford County is one of the few counties in the US to border two counties of the same name in different states (Tioga County in New York and Pennsylvania).

== Demographics ==
Historical population
Census	Pop.	Note	%±
1820	11,554		—
1830	19,746		70.9%
1840	32,769		66.0%
1850	42,831		30.7%
1860	48,734		13.8%
1870	53,204		9.2%
1880	58,541		10.0%
1890	59,233		1.2%
1900	59,403		0.3%
1910	54,526		−8.2%
1920	53,166		−2.5%
1930	49,039		−7.8%
1940	50,615		3.2%
1950	51,722		2.2%
1960	54,925		6.2%
1970	57,962		5.5%
1980	62,919		8.6%
1990	60,967		−3.1%
2000	62,761		2.9%
2010	62,622		−0.2%
2020	59,967		−4.2%
2025 (est.)	59,600	▼	−0.6%

=== Racial and ethnic composition ===
Bradford County, Pennsylvania – Racial and ethnic composition Note: the US Census treats Hispanic/Latino as an ethnic category. This table excludes Latinos from the racial categories and assigns them to a separate category. Hispanics/Latinos may be of any race.
Race / Ethnicity (NH = Non-Hispanic)	Pop 1980	Pop 1990	Pop 2000	Pop 2010	Pop 2020	% 1980	% 1990	% 2000	% 2010	% 2020
White alone (NH)	62,398	60,253	61,219	60,584	55,717	99.17%	98.83%	97.54%	96.75%	92.91%
Black or African American alone (NH)	79	148	249	269	394	0.13%	0.24%	0.40%	0.43%	0.66%
Native American or Alaska Native alone (NH)	64	114	187	127	117	0.10%	0.19%	0.30%	0.20%	0.20%
Asian alone (NH)	119	212	283	330	460	0.19%	0.35%	0.45%	0.53%	0.77%
Native Hawaiian or Pacific Islander alone (NH)	x	x	2	5	13	x	x	0.00%	0.01%	0.02%
Other race alone (NH)	36	22	29	27	133	0.06%	0.04%	0.05%	0.04%	0.22%
Mixed race or Multiracial (NH)	x	x	394	578	2,260	x	x	0.63%	0.92%	3.77%
Hispanic or Latino (any race)	223	218	398	702	873	0.35%	0.36%	0.63%	1.12%	1.46%
Total	62,919	60,967	62,761	62,622	59,967	100.00%	100.00%	100.00%	100.00%	100.00%

=== 2020 census ===
As of the 2020 census, the county had a population of 59,967. The median age was 44.1 years. 21.7% of residents were under the age of 18 and 21.4% of residents were 65 years of age or older. For every 100 females there were 99.2 males, and for every 100 females age 18 and over there were 97.6 males age 18 and over.

The racial makeup of the county was 93.4% White, 0.7% Black or African American, 0.2% American Indian and Alaska Native, 0.8% Asian, <0.1% Native Hawaiian and Pacific Islander, 0.5% from some other race, and 4.4% from two or more races. Hispanic or Latino residents of any race comprised 1.5% of the population.

27.0% of residents lived in urban areas, while 73.0% lived in rural areas.

There were 24,789 households in the county, of which 27.0% had children under the age of 18 living in them. Of all households, 48.8% were married-couple households, 19.0% were households with a male householder and no spouse or partner present, and 23.3% were households with a female householder and no spouse or partner present. About 28.9% of all households were made up of individuals and 14.0% had someone living alone who was 65 years of age or older.

There were 29,363 housing units, of which 15.6% were vacant. Among occupied housing units, 71.9% were owner-occupied and 28.1% were renter-occupied. The homeowner vacancy rate was 1.6% and the rental vacancy rate was 8.1%.

=== 2000 census ===
As of the 2000 census, there were 62,761 people, 24,453 households, and 17,312 families residing in the county. The population density was 54 people per square mile (21 people/km^{2}). There were 28,664 housing units at an average density of 25 units per square mile (9.7/km^{2}). The racial makeup of the county was 97.94% White, 0.40% Black or African American, 0.31% Native American, 0.45% Asian, 0.01% Pacific Islander, 0.19% from other races, and 0.69% from two or more races. 0.63% of the population were Hispanic or Latino of any race. 32.4% were of English, 19% German, 12.6% Irish and 6.4% Italian ancestry.

There were 24,453 households, out of which 31.80% had children under the age of 18 living with them, 57.40% were married couples living together, 8.90% had a female householder with no husband present, and 29.20% were non-families. 24.70% of all households were made up of individuals, and 11.50% had someone living alone who was 65 years of age or older. The average household size was 2.52 and the average family size was 2.99.

In the county, the population was spread out, with 25.50% under the age of 18, 6.80% from 18 to 24, 27.20% from 25 to 44, 24.70% from 45 to 64, and 15.70% who were 65 years of age or older. The median age was 39 years. For every 100 females there were 95.10 males. For every 100 females age 18 and over, there were 92.10 males.

== Micropolitan Statistical Area ==
The United States Office of Management and Budget has designated Bradford County as the Sayre, PA Micropolitan Statistical Area (μSA). As of the 2010 U.S. census the micropolitan area ranked 8th most populous in the State of Pennsylvania and the 131st most populous in the United States with a population of 62,622.

== Law and government ==
Bradford County is a Republican Party stronghold in presidential elections. The only two instances Republican presidential candidates have failed to win the county from 1880 to the present were when Theodore Roosevelt won it in 1912 by splitting the Republican vote & in 1964 when Lyndon B. Johnson won statewide & nationally in a landslide. Johnson is also the only Democrat to ever manage over forty percent of the county's vote. Even so, he won Bradford County only narrowly, by just over one percent.

=== Voter registration ===
Chart of Voter Registration
1. Republican (64.6%)
2. Democratic (22.2%)
3. Independent (8.78%)
4. Other Parties (4.44%)

As of February 7, 2024, there are 37,159 registered voters in the county. There are 23,988 registered Republicans, 8,258 registered Democrats, 3,264 voters registered non-affiliated voters, and 1,649 voters registered to other parties.

United States presidential election results for Bradford County, Pennsylvania
Year	Republican		Democratic		Third party(ies)	
Year	No.	%	No.	%	No.	%
1880	8,152	59.65%	4,950	36.22%	564	4.13%
1884	8,405	62.51%	4,216	31.36%	825	6.14%
1888	8,762	63.00%	4,552	32.73%	594	4.27%
1892	8,132	63.10%	4,080	31.66%	676	5.25%
1896	9,422	66.04%	4,388	30.76%	457	3.20%
1900	8,625	64.05%	4,211	31.27%	631	4.69%
1904	8,303	69.23%	2,862	23.86%	828	6.90%
1908	7,997	63.43%	3,758	29.81%	853	6.77%
1912	2,034	18.56%	2,960	27.01%	5,963	54.42%
1916	6,178	57.51%	3,655	34.03%	909	8.46%
1920	11,947	75.14%	2,825	17.77%	1,128	7.09%
1924	11,620	73.62%	2,307	14.62%	1,857	11.77%
1928	17,251	79.83%	4,281	19.81%	77	0.36%
1932	11,521	63.34%	5,970	32.82%	697	3.83%
1936	16,643	66.74%	8,078	32.39%	215	0.86%
1940	14,826	69.01%	6,605	30.74%	53	0.25%
1944	13,472	70.40%	5,523	28.86%	142	0.74%
1948	11,783	71.99%	4,421	27.01%	163	1.00%
1952	15,894	76.02%	4,959	23.72%	55	0.26%
1956	15,399	73.57%	5,502	26.29%	30	0.14%
1960	16,252	70.04%	6,920	29.82%	33	0.14%
1964	10,434	49.31%	10,714	50.63%	14	0.07%
1968	13,308	63.20%	6,373	30.26%	1,377	6.54%
1972	15,050	73.57%	5,204	25.44%	204	1.00%
1976	12,851	61.10%	7,913	37.62%	270	1.28%
1980	13,139	62.97%	6,439	30.86%	1,287	6.17%
1984	14,808	72.71%	5,474	26.88%	85	0.42%
1988	13,568	66.72%	6,635	32.63%	134	0.66%
1992	10,221	45.17%	6,903	30.51%	5,504	24.32%
1996	10,393	49.47%	7,736	36.82%	2,879	13.70%
2000	14,660	62.78%	7,911	33.88%	781	3.34%
2004	16,942	66.05%	8,590	33.49%	120	0.47%
2008	15,057	58.16%	10,306	39.81%	526	2.03%
2012	14,410	61.21%	8,624	36.64%	506	2.15%
2016	18,141	69.81%	6,369	24.51%	1,476	5.68%
2020	21,600	71.45%	8,046	26.61%	586	1.94%
2024	22,937	73.34%	7,990	25.55%	347	1.11%

United States Senate election results for Bradford County, Pennsylvania1
Year	Republican		Democratic		Third party(ies)	
Year	No.	%	No.	%	No.	%
1994	10,830	65.14%	5,037	30.30%	758	4.56%
2000	16,314	71.25%	6,150	26.86%	432	1.89%
2006	10,804	56.62%	8,277	43.38%	0	0.00%
2012	14,423	62.07%	8,234	35.43%	581	2.50%
2018	13,032	64.11%	6,926	34.07%	370	1.82%
2024	22,099	71.49%	8,007	25.90%	804	2.60%

United States Senate election results for Bradford County, Pennsylvania3
Year	Republican		Democratic		Third party(ies)	
Year	No.	%	No.	%	No.	%
1992	11,667	52.56%	8,951	40.32%	1,581	7.12%
1998	12,112	72.95%	3,932	23.68%	559	3.37%
2004	17,291	70.43%	6,066	24.71%	1,195	4.87%
2010	12,076	70.39%	5,080	29.61%	0	0.00%
2016	16,574	64.85%	6,985	27.33%	2,000	7.83%
2022	16,033	68.12%	6,632	28.18%	873	3.71%

Pennsylvania Gubernatorial election results for Bradford County
Year	Republican		Democratic		Third party(ies)	
Year	No.	%	No.	%	No.	%
1970	9,946	61.83%	5,580	34.69%	560	3.48%
1974	9,815	63.62%	5,457	35.37%	155	1.00%
1978	10,637	74.10%	3,629	25.28%	89	0.62%
1982	10,029	64.37%	5,489	35.23%	63	0.40%
1986	9,100	61.54%	5,547	37.51%	141	0.95%
1990	5,663	44.32%	7,063	55.28%	51	0.40%
1994	10,538	63.21%	4,700	28.19%	1,434	8.60%
1998	12,534	74.70%	3,041	18.12%	1,205	7.18%
2002	10,815	67.40%	4,947	30.83%	285	1.78%
2006	10,670	55.70%	8,485	44.30%	0	0.00%
2010	12,474	72.46%	4,741	27.54%	0	0.00%
2014	9,905	66.09%	5,082	33.91%	0	0.00%
2018	13,068	64.00%	6,852	33.56%	500	2.45%
2022	15,529	66.14%	7,389	31.47%	561	2.39%

=== County commissioners ===
- Daryl Miller, Chairman, Republican
- Doug McLinko, Vice-chairman, Republican
- Zachary Gates, Democrat

=== Other county officials ===
- Auditors, Roxanne Gilbert-Wells, Todd Grater, Charlotte Parks
- Clerk of Courts and Prothonotary, Tammy Hart
- Coroner, James Bowen
- District Attorney, Richard Wilson
- Register of Wills and Recorder of Deeds, Sheila Johnson
- Sheriff, Clinton J. Walters
- Treasurer, Matthew Allen

=== State senate ===
- Gene Yaw, Republican, Pennsylvania's 23rd Senatorial District

=== State House of Representatives ===
- Clint Owlett, Republican, Pennsylvania's 68th Representative District
- Tina Pickett, Republican, Pennsylvania's 110th Representative District

=== United States House of Representatives ===
- Dan Meuser, Republican, Pennsylvania's 9th congressional district

=== United States Senate ===
- John Fetterman, Democrat
- Dave McCormick, Republican

== Economy ==
Major employers are the natural gas industry, farming, logging, DuPont, Global-Tungsten and Powders (formerly Sylvania), Jeld-Wen, and Cargill Regional Beef, Wyalusing.

== Education ==
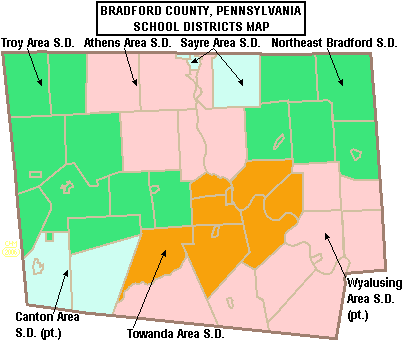
Bradford County school districts

=== Public school districts ===
- Athens Area School District
- Canton Area School District (also in Lycoming and Tioga Counties)
- Northeast Bradford School District
- Sayre Area School District
- Towanda Area School District
- Troy Area School District
- Wyalusing Area School District (also in Wyoming County)

=== Other public school entities ===
- BLAST Intermediate Unit 17
- Northern Tier Career Center Towanda
- Adult Ed Linkage Services – Troy
- Lackawanna College Towanda Center

=== Private schools ===
- Canton Country School – Canton
- Children's Place – Sayre
- Epiphany School (Catholic) Pre-K–6 – Sayre accepting OSTCP students
- Freedom Lane Academy – Milan
- G&G Learning Center – Rome
- Maranatha Mission Learning Community Branch 19 – Canton
- North Rome Christian School
- South Hill Amish School – Wyalusing
- St. Agnes Elementary School – Towanda accepting OSTCP students
- Union Valley Christian School – Ulster
- Valley View Amish School – Pike Township
- Wyalusing Valley Children's Center INC – Wyalusing

Data from EdNA database maintained by Pennsylvania Department of Education 2012

=== Libraries ===
- Allen F. Pierce Free Library – Troy
- Bradford County Library – Troy
- Bradford County Library System – Troy
- Green Free Library – Canton
- Mather Memorial Library – Ulster
- Monroeton Public Library – Monroeton
- New Albany Community Library Inc.
- Sayre Public Library
- Spalding Memorial Library – Athens
- Towanda Public Library
- Wyalusing Public Library

== Transportation ==
Public transportation is provided by BeST Transit.

=== Major highways ===
- I-86 / NY 17 / Southern Tier Expressway (briefly crosses the NY-PA state border, but is maintained by NYSDOT)
- US 220
- PA 14
- PA 154
- PA 187
- PA 328
- PA 367
- PA 414
- PA 467
- PA 514
- PA 549

== Recreation ==
There is one Pennsylvania state park in Bradford County.

- Mt. Pisgah State Park

== Communities ==
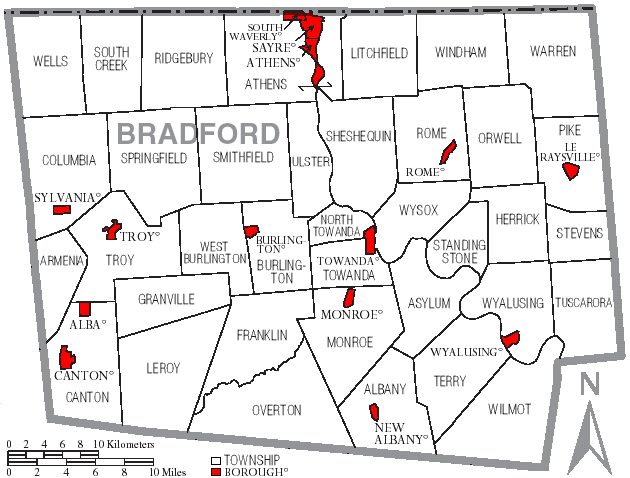
Map of Bradford County, Pennsylvania with Municipal Labels showing Boroughs (red) and Townships (white).

Under Pennsylvania law, there are four types of incorporated municipalities: cities, boroughs, townships, and, in only one case (Bloomsburg, Columbia County), towns. The following boroughs and townships are located in Bradford County:

=== Boroughs ===
- Alba
- Athens
- Burlington
- Canton
- Le Raysville
- Monroe
- New Albany
- Rome
- Sayre
- South Waverly
- Sylvania
- Towanda (county seat)
- Troy
- Wyalusing

=== Townships ===
- Albany
- Armenia
- Asylum
- Athens
- Burlington
- Canton
- Columbia
- Franklin
- Granville
- Herrick
- Leroy
- Litchfield
- Monroe
- North Towanda
- Orwell
- Overton
- Pike
- Ridgebury
- Rome
- Sheshequin
- Smithfield
- South Creek
- Springfield
- Standing Stone
- Stevens
- Terry
- Towanda
- Troy
- Tuscarora
- Ulster
- Warren
- Wells
- West Burlington
- Wilmot
- Windham
- Wyalusing
- Wysox

=== Census-designated place ===
- Greens Landing

=== Unincorporated communities ===
- Berrytown
- Browntown
- Camptown
- Merryall

=== Population ranking ===
The population ranking of the following table is based on the 2010 census of Bradford County.

† county seat

Rank	City/Town/etc.	Population (2010 Census)	Municipal type	Incorporated
1	Sayre	5,587	Borough	1891
2	Athens	3,367	Borough	1831
3	† Towanda	2,919	Borough	1828
4	Canton	1,976	Borough	1864
5	Troy	1,354	Borough	1845
6	South Waverly	1,027	Borough	1878
7	Greens Landing	894	CDP	—
8	Wyalusing	596	Borough	1887
9	Monroe	554	Borough	1855
10	Rome	441	Borough	1860
11	New Albany	356	Borough	1879
12	Le Raysville	290	Borough	1863
13	Sylvania	219	Borough	1853
14	Alba	157	Borough	1864
15	Burlington	156	Borough	1854

== See also ==
- National Register of Historic Places listings in Bradford County, Pennsylvania
