= National Register of Historic Places listings in Bradford County, Pennsylvania =

Location of Bradford County in Pennsylvania

This is a list of the National Register of Historic Places listings in Bradford County, Pennsylvania.

This is intended to be a complete list of the properties and districts on the National Register of Historic Places in Bradford County, Pennsylvania, United States. The locations of National Register properties and districts for which the latitude and longitude coordinates are included below, may be seen in a map.

There are 13 properties and districts listed on the National Register in the county.

This National Park Service list is complete through NPS recent listings posted January 23, 2026.

== Current listings ==
	Name on the Register	Image	Date listed	Location	City or town	Description
1	Athens Historic District	Athens Historic District	June 18, 2004 (#04000612)	Roughly bounded by Elm and Locust Streets, 772 South Main Street, and the Chemung and Susquehanna River; 41°57′02″N 76°31′00″W	Athens	
2	Phillip Paul Bliss House	Phillip Paul Bliss House	April 24, 1986 (#86000865)	Main Street; 41°51′29″N 76°20′32″W	Rome	
3	Bradford County Courthouse	Bradford County Courthouse	January 6, 1987 (#86003573)	301 Main Street; 41°45′59″N 76°26′21″W	Towanda	
4	Knapp's Covered Bridge	Knapp's Covered Bridge	July 24, 1980 (#80003428)	East of Burlington on Township 554; 41°47′09″N 76°33′13″W	Burlington Township	part of the Covered Bridges of Bradford, Sullivan and Lycoming Counties Thematic Resource (TR)
5	Methodist Episcopal Church of Burlington	Methodist Episcopal Church of Burlington	January 4, 1990 (#89002280)	U.S. Route 6 at Township 357; 41°46′24″N 76°37′53″W	West Burlington Township	
6	Protection of the Flag Monument	Protection of the Flag Monument	June 8, 2001 (#01000604)	715 South Main Street; 41°57′03″N 76°30′59″W	Athens	
7	Spalding Memorial Library-Tioga Point Museum	Spalding Memorial Library-Tioga Point Museum	February 18, 2000 (#00000059)	724 South Main Street; 41°57′06″N 76°31′00″W	Athens	
8	Towanda Historic District	Towanda Historic District	May 7, 1992 (#92000394)	Roughly bounded by Elizabeth, Fourth, and Kingsbury Streets and the Susquehanna River; 41°46′19″N 76°26′47″W	Towanda	
9	Troy Public High School	Troy Public High School	February 20, 2002 (#02000067)	250 High Street; 41°47′21″N 76°47′08″W	Troy	
10	Universalist Meeting House of Sheshequin	Universalist Meeting House of Sheshequin	September 18, 2013 (#13000742)	6752 Sheshequin Road; 41°52′29″N 76°29′59″W	Sheshequin Township	
11	Van Dyne Civic Building	Van Dyne Civic Building	January 21, 1974 (#74001754)	Main and Elmira Streets; 41°47′11″N 76°47′10″W	Troy	
12	Ellen and Charles F. Welles House	Ellen and Charles F. Welles House	May 20, 1999 (#99000608)	1 Grovedale Lane; also 3 Grovedale Lane; 41°39′38″N 76°15′27″W	Wyalusing Township	3 Grovedale represents a boundary increase of November 15, 2003
13	Wyalusing Borough Historic District	Wyalusing Borough Historic District	September 15, 2003 (#03000934)	Roughly bounded by Prospect, First, Second, Third, Noble Sts., and Taylor Ave. 41°40′06″N 76°15′43″W	Wyalusing	

== Former listing ==
	Name on the Register	Image	Date listed	Date removed	Location	City or town	Description
1	Bridge in Athens Township	Bridge in Athens Township	June 22, 1988 (#88000821)	August 22, 2012	Legislative Route 08081 over the Susquehanna River; 41°57′29″N 76°30′52″W	Athens and Athens Township	Replaced in 2005

== See also ==
- List of Pennsylvania state historical markers in Bradford County
