= Elsie Murray =

American psychologist

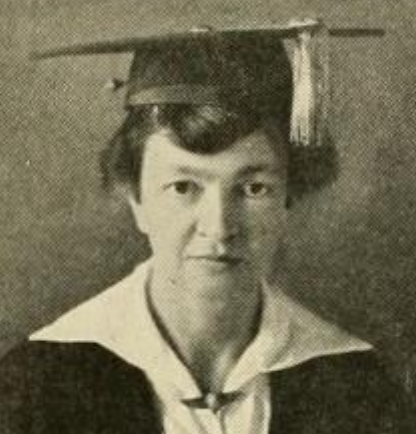
- Elsie Murray, from a 1921 yearbook
- Born: September 17, 1878; Athens, Pennsylvania
- Died: September 30, 1965 (aged 87); Athens, Pennsylvania
- Occupations: Psychologist, college professor, museum professional

Elsie Murray (September 17, 1878 – September 30, 1965) was an American psychologist and college professor. Her research involved color perception, memory, and color blindness. She was also director of the historic sites at French Azilum and Tioga Point Museum in Pennsylvania.

== Early life ==
Elsie Murray was born in Athens, Pennsylvania, the daughter of Millard P. Murray and Louise Shipman Welles Murray. Her mother was the first director of the Tioga Point Museum. She attended Bryn Mawr College in 1896 and 1897, graduated from Cornell University in 1904, and completed doctoral studies there in 1907, with a dissertation titled "Organic Sensation". Murray took further coursework at Columbia University in 1914 and 1915.

== Career ==
=== Research and teaching ===
Murray taught psychology courses at Vassar College (1907 to 1909), Wilson College (1909 to 1919), Sweet Briar College (1919 to 1922), Wells College (1922 to 1923), the University of Illinois (1924 to 1926). She became a research associate at Cornell University in 1927. She was a member of the American Psychological Association and the International Society of Color Council.

Murray's research involved color vision, memory, and other mental tasks, including spelling. Her work was published in the Journal of the Optical Society of America (JOSA), the Journal of Applied Psychology, and the Journal of Educational Psychology. She also contributed to The Dictionary of Psychology (1935), edited by Howard C. Warren.

=== Local history ===
Murray succeeded her sister Jessie as director of the Tioga Point Museum in Bradford County, Pennsylvania, from 1935 to 1955; she was also named director of the nearby French Azilum historic site in 1954. In connection with this work, Murray was a member of the Daughters of the American Revolution, the Historical Society of Pennsylvania, the Wyoming Historical and Geological Society, and the Bradford County Historical Society. She wrote books and pamphlets about Bradford County history, including French Exiles of 1793 in Northern Pennsylvania (1935), Azilum: The Story of a French Royalist Colony of 1793 (1937), Franco-Americana in Tioga Point Museum (1938), Te-a-o-ga: Annals of a Valley (1939), Stephen C. Foster at Athens: His First Composition (1940), New World or Old? A Tale of the French Refugees and their Azilum on the Susquehanna (1945), Carantouan, Old Spanish Hill; Étienne Brulé, explorer of the Susquehanna (1948), Early land companies and titles of Northumberland County (1954), and A Frontier Trianon: The True Story of Azilum Village (1955).

== Personal life ==
Murray died at a nursing home in Athens, Pennsylvania in 1965, aged 87 years. She left her entire estate, about $20,000, to the French Azilum. Murray's papers are in the collection of Cornell University Library.
