= J. Scot Chadwick =

American politician

Member of the Pennsylvania House of Representatives from the 110th district
- In office January 1, 1985 – November 30, 2000
- Preceded by: Roger Madigan
- Succeeded by: Tina Pickett

Personal details
- Born: September 13, 1953 (age 72) Troy, Pennsylvania
- Party: Republican
- Spouse: Michele L.
- Education: Bucknell University; Villanova University School of Law

J. Scot Chadwick (born September 13, 1953) is a former Republican member of the Pennsylvania House of Representatives.

Chadwick graduated from Towanda Area High School in 1971. He later graduated from Bucknell University in 1975 and earned a law degree from Villanova University School of Law in 1978. He was elected to represent the 110th legislative district in 1984, following the retirement of Republican incumbent Roger Madigan, who was elected to represent Pennsylvania's 23rd senatorial district. Chadwick retired prior to the 2000 elections and was succeeded by Tina Pickett.
