= Pennsylvania House of Representatives, District 110 =

American legislative district

Pennsylvania's 110th State House of Representatives district
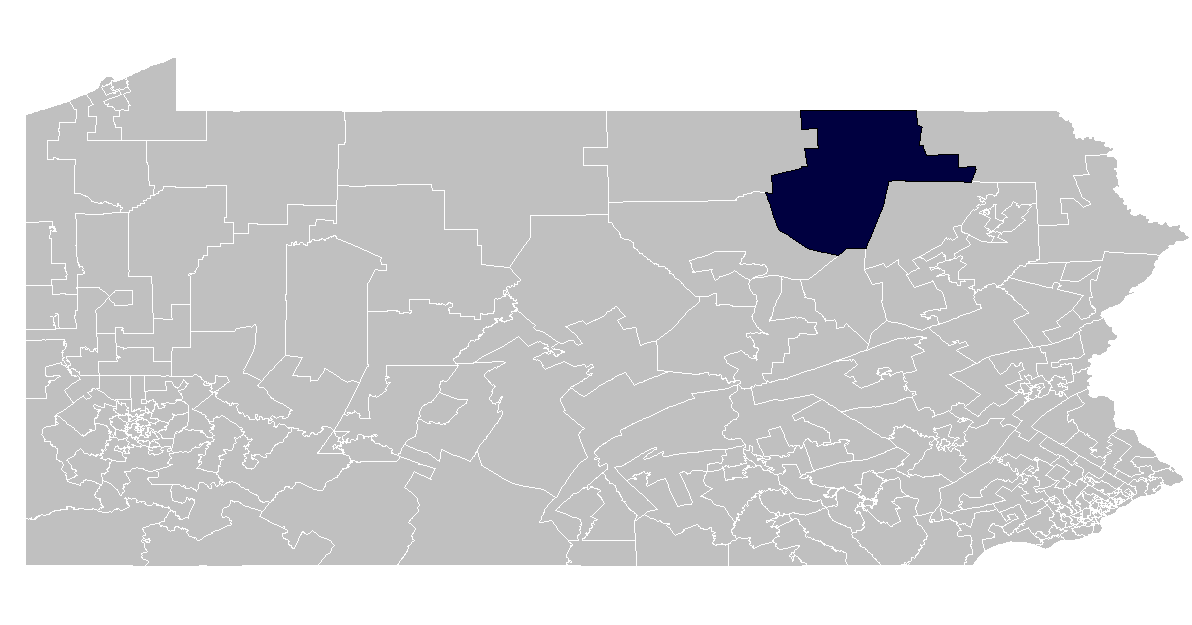
Representative
Tina Pickett; R–Towanda

The 110th Pennsylvania House of Representatives District is located in Bradford County and Wyoming County and includes the following areas:

- Bradford County
  - Albany Township
  - Asylum Township
  - Athens
  - Athens Township
  - Herrick Township
  - Le Raysville
  - Litchfield Township
  - New Albany
  - Orwell Township
  - Pike Township
  - Rome
  - Rome Township
  - Sayre
  - Sheshequin Township
  - South Waverly
  - Standing Stone Township
  - Stevens Township
  - Terry Township
  - Towanda
  - Tuscarora Township
  - Ulster Township
  - Warren Township
  - Wilmot Township
  - Windham Township
  - Wyalusing
  - Wyalusing Township
  - Wysox Township
- All of Wyoming County

== Representatives ==
Representative	Party	Years	District home	Note
Prior to 1969, seats were apportioned by county.
Andrew S. Moscrip	Republican	1969 – 1972		
David M. Turner	Republican	1973 – 1976		
Roger Madigan	Republican	1977 – 1984	Towanda	Pennsylvania State Senator for the 23rd district from 1985 to 2008
J. Scot Chadwick	Republican	1985 – 2000		
Tina Pickett	Republican	2001 – present	Towanda	Incumbent

== Recent election results ==
PA House election, 2022: Pennsylvania House of Representatives, District 110
Party	Candidate	Votes	%
Republican	Tina Pickett	Unopposed	
Total votes		22,426	100.00
Republican hold			
