= Moscrip =

Moscrip is a surname. Notable people with the surname include:

- Andrew Moscrip (1915–1978), American politician
- Jim Moscrip (1913– 1980), American professional football player
- William Caven Moscrip (1852–1911), Canadian politician

== See also ==
- Moscrop Secondary School
