= List of Pennsylvania state historical markers in Bradford County =

Location of Bradford County in Pennsylvania

This is a list of the Pennsylvania state historical markers in Bradford County, as designated by the Pennsylvania Historical and Museum Commission (PHMC). There are 47 historical markers located in Bradford County.

== Historical markers ==
Marker title	Image	Date dedicated	Location	Marker type	Topics
Asylum - PLAQUE		June 1930	Located at Marie Antoinette Lookout; 41.73111°N 76.29749°W	Plaque	Early Settlement, Ethnic & Immigration, Government & Politics 18th Century
Athens		May 12, 1947	PA 199 (old U.S. 220) at Tioga Point Cemetery, Athens	Roadside	Cities & Towns, Early Settlement, Military, Native American
Azilum	]	May 12, 1947	U.S. 6, 4.5 miles N of Wyalusing at lookout 41.73060°N 76.29727°W	Roadside	Cities & Towns, Early Settlement, Ethnic & Immigration
Azilum		May 12, 1947	Junction U.S. 6 & Pa. 187 at Wysox; 41.7744°N 76.39787°W	Roadside	Cities & Towns, Early Settlement, Ethnic & Immigration
Bradford County		July 10, 1982	County Courthouse, Main St., Towanda; 41.76730°N 76.44299°W	City	Government & Politics, Government & Politics 19th Century, Military
Camptown		May 15, 1969	Junction Pa. 706 & 409 at Camptown; 41.7301°N 76.2349°W	Roadside	Cities & Towns, Music & Theater, Sports, Writers
Camptown Races		May 12, 1947	Junction U.S. 6 & Pa. 409, 4.2 miles N of Wyalusing; 41.72703°N 76.29532°W	Roadside	Music & Theater
Carrying Path		September 6, 1948	Pa. 199 at Chemung River Bridge into Athens; 41.94889°N 75.51614°W	Roadside	Native American, Paths & Trails, Transportation
Century Farm Program		2021	County Courthouse, Main St., Towanda; 41.76690°N 76.44300°W	Roadside	Agriculture, Early Settlement
Colonel John Franklin		September 23, 1946	SR 1043, 1.2 miles SE of Athens at cemetery (to be replaced)	Roadside	American Revolution, Government & Politics, Military
David Wilmot		May 12, 1947	William St. at Riverside Cemetery, Towanda (Missing)	Roadside	African American, Government & Politics, Government & Politics 19th Century
David Wilmot		May 12, 1947	U.S. 6 (York Ave.) above Barstow Ave., Towanda; 41.77482°N 76.44528°W	Roadside	African American, Government & Politics, Government & Politics 19th Century
Fort Sullivan		May 12, 1947	Pa. 199 in southern Athens; 41.94893°N 76.51598°W	Roadside	American Revolution, Forts, Military, Native American
Fort Sullivan "Soldiers' Burial" - PLAQUE		1929	US 220 & 309, Athens	Plaque	American Revolution, Forts, Military
Friedenshuetten		July 22, 1948	U.S. 6, 1.3 miles SE of Wyalusing; 41.65347°N 76.23962°W	City	Early Settlement, Native American, Religion
Indian Hill		May 12, 1947	U.S. 6, 4.6 miles E of Wyalusing; 41.67442°N 76.19243°W	Roadside	American Revolution, Military, Native American
Indian Hill Battlefield - PLAQUE		October 1928	off US 6 - Cornell Rd., ~5 miles E of Wyalusing, 1st right past Indian Hill marker traveling east 41.67170°N 76.18940°W	Plaque	American Revolution, Military, Native American
Joseph Elliot - PLAQUE		n/a	Lime Hill, US 6, W of Wyalusing; 41.72332°N 76.29081°W	Plaque	American Revolution, George Washington, Military, Native American
Lester Frank Ward		January 30, 1967	Pa. 187 at Myersburg; 41.79644°N 76.37961°W	Roadside	Civil War, Medicine & Science, Professions & Vocations
Lime Hill		May 12, 1947	U.S. 6 at Limehill, 3.7 miles N of Wyalusing; 41.72338°N 76.2909°W	Roadside	American Revolution, Military, Native American
Lime Hill Battlefield - PLAQUE		November 1, 1928	US 6, 3.7 miles N of Wyalusing; 41.72330°N 76.29073°W	Plaque	American Revolution, Military, Native American
Pennsylvania		June 10, 1948	Pa. 14, .2 miles from state line	Roadside	Government & Politics, Government & Politics 17th Century, William Penn
Pennsylvania		September 27, 1949	U.S. 220 & 309, .3 miles from state line(MISSING)	Roadside	Government & Politics, Government & Politics 17th Century, William Penn
Philip P. Bliss		May 12, 1947	Pa. 187 in Rome at cemetery 41.86417°N 76.33540°W	Roadside	Performers, Religion, Writers
Pine Plains		May 12, 1947	Pa. 199 (Keystone Ave.), at First Church of God, Sayre	City	Early Settlement, Environment, Native American
Queen Esther's Town		n/a	U.S. 220 (E side), .3 miles N of Milan (Missing)	Roadside	Cities & Towns, Early Settlement, Native American, Women
Rural Electrification		October 24, 1986	US 6 near Goff / W Valley Rd., 3.2 miles E of Wysox; 41.76025°N 76.36415°W	Roadside	Agriculture, Business & Industry, Electricity
Sheshequin Path (#1)		September 6, 1948	US 220 near Crest Rd., 3.1 miles NW of Towanda; 41.8052°N 76.49503°W	Roadside	Government & Politics, Native American, Paths & Trails, Transportation
Sheshequin Path (#2)		March 16, 1949	Pa. 414 near Le Roy, 5.6 miles SW of West Franklin (Missing)	Roadside	Native American, Paths & Trails
Stephen Foster		May 12, 1947	Pa. 199 (old U.S. 220) in Athens; 41.95123°N 76.51620°W	Roadside	Education, Music & Theater, Writers
Stephen Foster		May 12, 1947	U.S. 6 (Main St.) near State St., Towanda; 41.7687°N 76.4431°W	Roadside	Education, Music & Theater, Writers
Sullivan Expedition Against the Iroquois Indians, 1779 - Breakneck Hill (PLAQUE)		n/a	Off US 220 between Towanda and Ulster (MISSING)	Plaque	American Revolution, Military, Native American, Paths & Trails
Sullivan Expedition Against the Iroquois Indians, 1779 - Sheshecunnunck (PLAQUE)		1929	E side of SR 1043 in Sheshequin Twp., 2.3 miles N of the bridge into Ulster; 41.88083°N 76.50250°W	Plaque	American Revolution, Military, Native American
Sullivan Expedition Against the Iroquois Indians, 1779 - Standing Stone (PLAQUE)		1929	SR 2016, Standing Stone; 41.74223°N 76.33542°W	Plaque	American Revolution, Military, Native American
Sullivan Expedition Against the Iroquois Indians, 1779 - Teaoga (PLAQUE)		1929	Corner of Tioga (PA 199) & Main Sts., Athens; 41.95122°N 76.51621°W	Plaque	American Revolution, Military, Native American
Sullivan Expedition Against the Iroquois Indians, 1779 - Wyalusing (PLAQUE)		1929	US 6, 1.4 miles SE of Wyalusing; 41.65385°N 76.23965°W	Plaque	American Revolution, Military, Native American, Religion
Sullivan's March		May 12, 1947	U.S. 6, 1.4 miles SE of Wyalusing; 41.65373°N 76.23943°W	Roadside	American Revolution, Military, Native American
Sullivan's March		May 12, 1947	SR 1043, Ulster, (Missing)	Roadside	American Revolution, Military
Sullivan's March		May 12, 1947	U.S. 6, ~6.2 miles NW of Wyalusing, at Standing Stone Twp. Bldg. 41.74837°N 76.3231°W	Roadside	American Revolution, Military, Native American
Sullivan's March		March 15, 1949	U.S. 220, 1.3 miles N of Ulster; 41.87128°N 76.50963°W	Roadside	American Revolution, Military
Teaoga		September 6, 1948	Pa. 199, S end Chemung River Bridge into Athens; 41.94570°N 76.52123°W	Roadside	Native American
Teaoga & Queen Esther's Town - PLAQUE		1928	US 220 (E side), 1 mile N of Milan; 41.91908°N 76.52484°W	Plaque	Cities & Towns, Early Settlement, Native American
The Carrying Path - PLAQUE		n/a	PA 199 at N end of bridge into Athens (MISSING)	Plaque	Native American, Paths & Trails
Warriors Path		March 15, 1949	GAR Hwy. (US 6), 1.3 miles N of Wyalusing; 41.69213°N 76.27167°W	Roadside	Native American, Paths & Trails, Transportation
Wyalusing		March 15, 1949	GAR Hwy. (US 6) at S end of Wyalusing; 41.66488°N 76.25985°W	Roadside	Cities & Towns, Early Settlement, Native American
Wyalusing Rocks		August 30, 1948	U.S. 6 & U.S. 309, 1.3 miles N of Wyalusing at lookout (Missing)	City	Environment

== See also ==
- List of Pennsylvania state historical markers
- National Register of Historic Places listings in Bradford County, Pennsylvania
