= David M. Turner =

American politician (1917–2012)

Member of the Pennsylvania House of Representatives from the 110th district
- In office January 4, 1973 – November 30, 1976
- Preceded by: Andrew S. Moscrip
- Succeeded by: Roger Madigan

Personal details
- Born: May 17, 1917 Towanda, Pennsylvania, United States
- Died: September 8, 2012 (aged 95) Naples, Florida, United States
- Party: Republican

David MacAllister Turner, Sr. (May 17, 1917 – September 8, 2012) was a former Republican member of the Pennsylvania House of Representatives.
