= Tina Pickett =

American politician (born 1943)

Tina L. Pickett

Member of the Pennsylvania House of Representatives from the 110th district
- Incumbent
- Assumed office January 2, 2001
- Preceded by: J. Scot Chadwick

Personal details
- Born: May 28, 1943 (age 83) Kingston, Pennsylvania, U.S.
- Party: Republican
- Education: Culinary Institute of America; Keystone College; Penn State University
- Website: www.reppickett.com

Tina L. Pickett (born May 28, 1943) is a Republican member of the Pennsylvania House of Representatives who was elected in 2000 to represent the 110th District, which includes Bradford (part) and Wyoming counties.

During the 2023-24 Legislative Session, Pickett serves as Republican chair of the House Insurance Committee, which oversees general insurance company operations; homeowners, life, health and automobile insurance; the Children’s Health Insurance Program; and agent and broker licensing, among other duties. She was also appointed to serve as Republican chair of the House Committee on Committees. Pickett served as a Bradford County commissioner from 1996 to 2000. Her legislative service also includes chairmanship of the House Gaming Oversight Committee, and as a member of the House Appropriations, Transportation and Agricultural and Rural Affairs committees.

Pickett's House tenure includes 18 of her bills becoming law.

== Personal ==
Pickett resides in Towanda. She has one daughter and one granddaughter. Prior to her political career, Pickett founded and operated the Fireplace Restaurant in Tunkhannock and the Williamston Inn in Wysox.
