= Mary Canfield Ballard =

American poet and hymnwriter

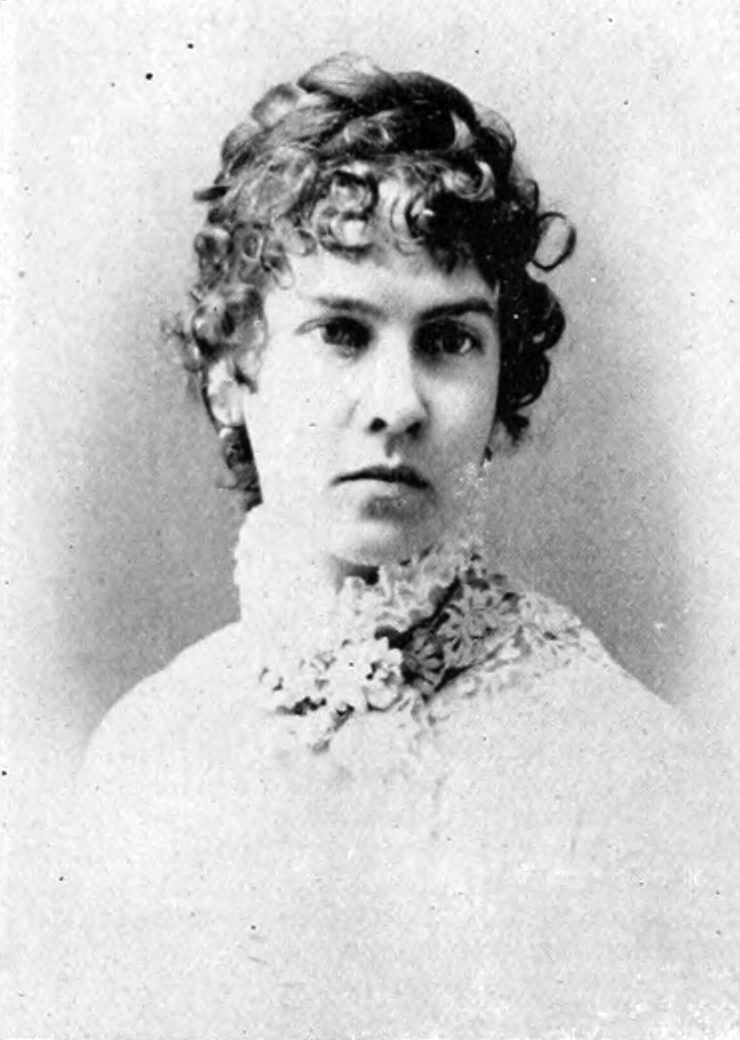
- Photo in A Woman of the Century
- Born: June 22, 1852; Troy, Pennsylvania, U.S.
- Died: September 7, 1927 (aged 75)
- Resting place: Saint Johns Cemetery, Troy, Pennsylvania, U.S.
- Education: Pennsylvania State Normal School
- Occupations: poet, hymnwriter
- Relatives: Ethan Allen
- Writing career
- Pen name: Minnie C. Ballard
- Language: English
- Genre: poetry
- Notable work: ... Idle Fancies

Mary Canfield Ballard (pen name Minnie C. Ballard; June 22, 1852 – September 7, 1927) was an American poet and hymnwriter from Pennsylvania. She began writing poetry at the age of sixteen and was a prolific contributor to numerous periodicals, including Godey's Lady's Book and the New York Evening Post. Her published works include a collection of poems, Idle Fancies. Ballard also wrote the lyrics for hymns such as "Easter Hymn" and "Shall It Be You or I?".

== Early life and education ==
Mary Canfield Ballard was born in Troy, Pennsylvania, June 22, 1852. Her parents were Orrin Porter Ballard and Eliza Ann Spalding Ballard. On her mother's side, Ballard was related to Colonel Ethan Allen, of Revolutionary fame. Her father was a self-made man and accumulated considerable property in Bradford County, Pennsylvania.

She was sent to the Pennsylvania State Normal School when about fourteen years old, but, growing homesick, she returned to her home in Troy where she finished her education.

Her early literary efforts were very ambitious ones. When she was only thirteen years old, she wrote a continued story about a hair-pin, managing to introduce an elopement, an angry father, tears, repentance and forgiveness. She also wrote an essay on Sappho. She began to write poems at the age of sixteen.

== Career ==
Ballard was the youngest of a large family, but, her brothers and sisters being married and her father and mother dead, she lived alone.

She was devoted to painting, music and literature and was a prolific contributor to periodicals under the pen name "Minnie C. Ballard" ever since she sent her first poem to William Cullen Bryant, who gave it a place in the New York Evening Post. Her first published productions made their appearance when she was 21 years old. Since her appearance in the poets' corner of the Evening Post, she contributed occasionally to some thirty periodicals. Ballard published Idle Fancies (Troy, Pa., 1883), for private circulation, and a new edition for the general public (Philadelphia, 1884). She contributed to the Philadelphia Times, The Cincinnati Enquirer, the Louisville Courier-Journal, Godey's Lady's Book, Peterson's Magazine, and the St. Louis Magazine.

She wrote the lyrics for the hymns, "Easter Hymn", first published in The International Lesson Hymnal (Chicago, Illinois: David C Cook, 1878), number 108., music by E. B. Smith, 1878, and "Shall It Be You or I?".

== Death ==
Ballard died September 7, 1927, and is buried at Saint Johns Cemetery, Troy, Pennsylvania.

== Selected works ==
- The Pocket Manual No. 4, or, Idle Fancies, 1884
