= Sabra Wilbur Vought =

American librarian

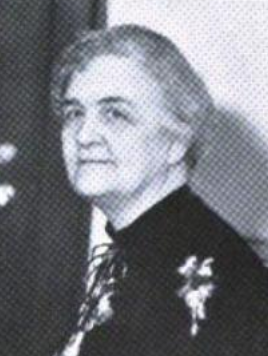
- Sabra Wilbur Vought, from a 1937 publication of the US Department of the Interior
- Born: May 23, 1877; Towanda, Pennsylvania
- Died: March 2, 1942 (aged 64); Washington, D.C.
- Occupation(s): Librarian, federal official

Sabra Wilbur Vought (May 23, 1877 – March 2, 1942) was an American academic librarian and federal official. Beginning in 1937, she was librarian for the Department of the Interior, covering library services for the Office of Education as well as the Bureau of Mines, the Office of Indian Affairs, and the National Park Service.

== Early life and education ==
Vought as born in Towanda, Pennsylvania, the daughter of Frank M. Vought and Adella (or Almeda) M. Wilbur Vought. She was raised in Jamestown, New York, and graduated from Allegheny College in 1899. She trained as a librarian at the New York State Library School, earning a second bachelor's degree in 1901, in library science.

== Career ==
Vought was an academic and government librarian, with positions at the University of Tennessee (1901 to 1910), the Ohio Library Commission, Allegheny College, the State University of New York (1919-1924), and Pennsylvania State University (1924 to 1930). In 1904 and 1905, she taught at the Summer School for Librarians in Winona Lake, Indiana. In 1906 she began teaching at the Summer Library School in Chautauqua, New York. She also taught at the University of Illinois, and at the Library Service School in Riverside, California.

In 1930, Vought was appointed director of library service for the United States Office of Education, federal liaison to the American Library Association and administrator of "a technical library of over 125,000 volumes". She also wrote a monthly column for the Office of Education's publication, School Life. In 1937 she became librarian for the Department of the Interior, covering library services for the Office of Education as well as the Bureau of Mines, the Office of Indian Affairs, and the National Park Service.

Vought was an active member of the District of Columbia Library Association, the Daughters of the American Revolution (DAR), Altrusa International, the American Association of University Women (AAUW), Phi Beta Kappa, and the National Education Association.

== Publications ==
- Use of Periodicals (1911)
- "Training the School Librarian" (1922)
- "The Development of the School Library" (1923)
- Library Service (1931, with Edith Anna Lathrop)
- "The Library of the Federal Office of Education" (1934)
- "The Office of Education Library", "College Catalog Collection", and "Special Collections in the Library" (1937)

== Personal life ==
Vought was close to her cousins in California. She died in 1942, in Washington, D.C., aged 64 years. There is a small collection of her papers at the University at Albany, State University of New York.
