= Luthers Mills, Pennsylvania =

Unincorporated community in Pennsylvania, US

Luthers Mills
- Village
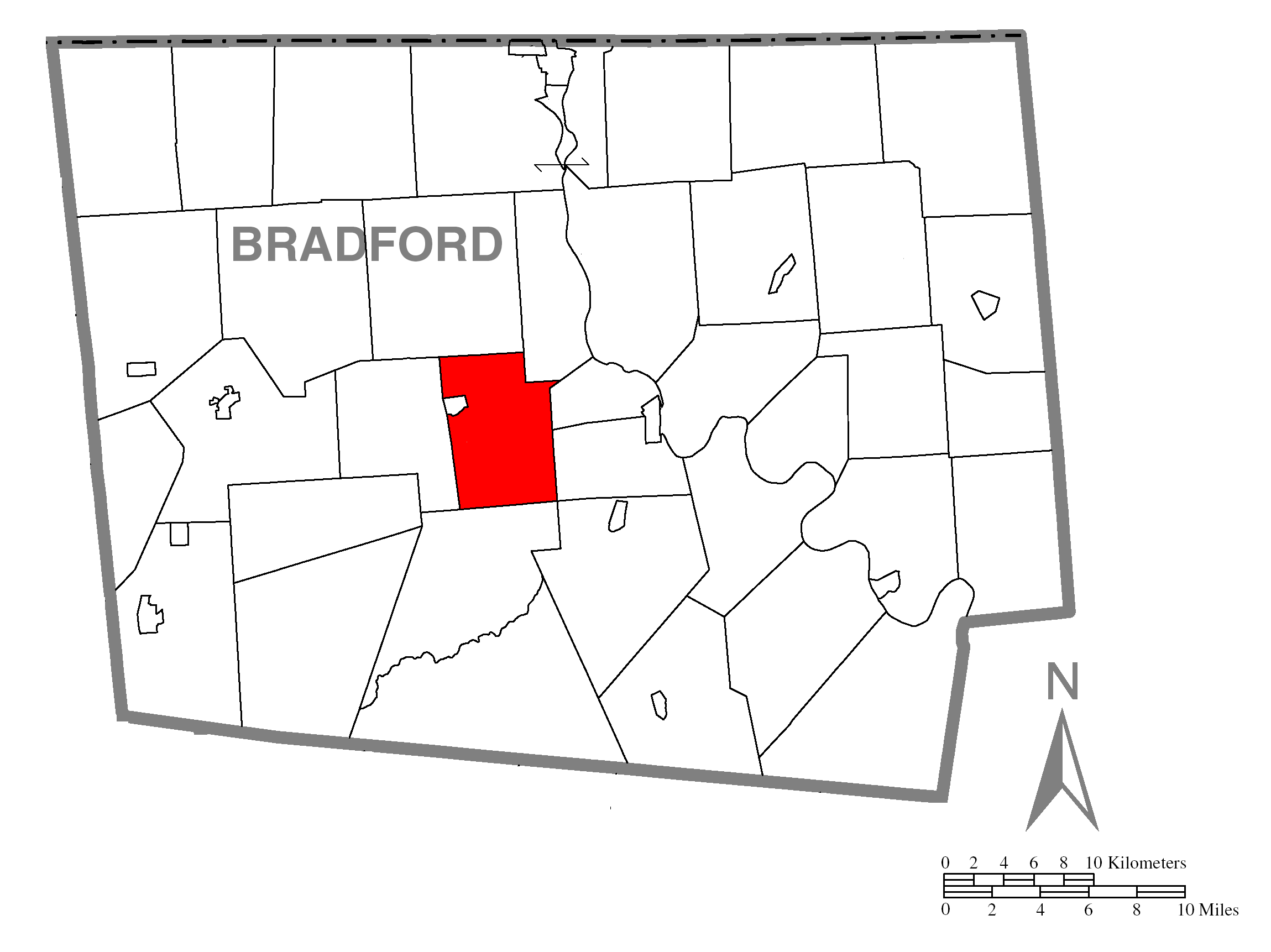
- Location of Burlington Township within Bradford County

- Location of Luthers Mills within Pennsylvania Luthers Mills (the United States)
- Coordinates: 41°47′N 76°33′W
- Country: United States
- State: Pennsylvania
- County: Bradford
- Township: Burlington

Luthers Mills is a village in Burlington Township, Bradford County, Pennsylvania, United States. The village is located east of the borough of Burlington and north of U.S. Route 6. Luthers Mills and Highland are the only villages in Burlington Township.

== Notable person ==
- Roger A. Madigan (1930–2018), Pennsylvania State Senator and Representative
