= Mike Conley (boxer) =

American boxer (1860–1920)

Personal information
- Born: September 27, 1860
- Died: March 14, 1920 (aged 59)

Boxing career

Mike Conley (27 September 1860 – 14 March 1920) was a late 19th-century professional heavyweight boxer. He was born in Towanda, Pennsylvania, but resided in Ithaca, New York, where he was known as the "Ithaca Giant". He was described as a bona fide heavyweight with a "heavyweight" punch. He was reportedly the Heavyweight Champion of the Northwest. His greatest weakness as a boxer was said to be his lack of boxing finesse. An image of Conley is widely used in Internet memes commonly referred to as "Overly Manly Man".
