= Ellen Oliver Van Fleet =

American poet

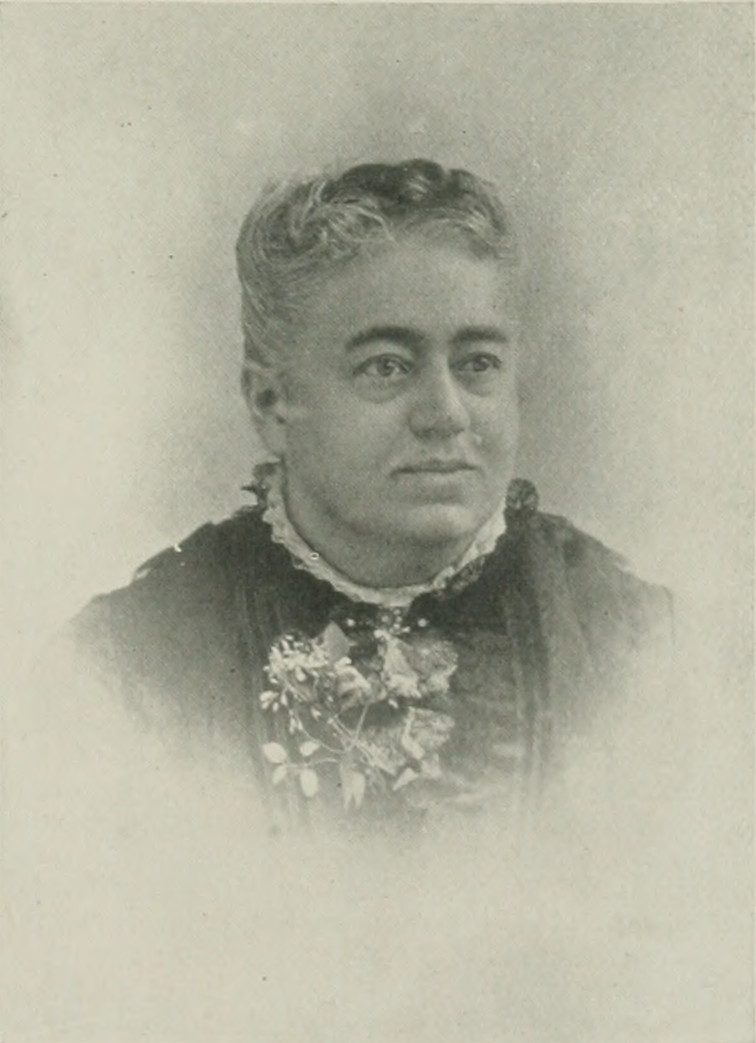
- Photo in A Woman of the Century
- Born: Ellen Oliver; March 2, 1842; Troy, Pennsylvania, US
- Died: May 8, 1893 (aged 51)
- Resting place: Oak Hill Cemetery, Troy, Pennsylvania
- Education: Troy Academy
- Occupations: poet; hymnwriter
- Spouse: Charles G. Van Fleet (m. 1887)
- Writing career
- Notable work: "The Wanderer's Prayer"

Ellen Oliver Van Fleet (née, Oliver; March 2, 1842 – May 8, 1893) was a 19th-century American poet and hymnwriter. "The Wanderer's Prayer" is one of her more notable hymns. Under her maiden name, she published the hymns "Come, raise your flag, reformers", "The door of God's mercy is open", "They are winging, they are winging", "We are only boys in stature", and "With temperance banner wide unfurled". Never aspiring to literary fame, and she always writing for a purpose, her contributions to various periodicals and magazines were numerous.

== Biography ==
Ellen Oliver was born in the town of Troy, Bradford County, Pennsylvania, March 2, 1842. She was of English parentage. From her mother, she inherited domestic tendencies, together with a regard for duty. From her father, she inherited a strong literary taste.

Van Fleet was educated by private teachers at home, in the public schools and private schools of her native town, in the Troy Academy, and in Mrs. Life's seminary for young women, then in Muncy, Pennsylvania.

Her lesson hymns were plentiful and beautiful. She wrote a large number during a period of eight years, which were used by David C. Cook, publisher, of Chicago, Illinois. Among her hymns of note is "The Wanderer's Prayer", music by the Rev. S. L. Conde, which was extensively sung in the U.S. and in Europe. Her later writings bore the impress of mature thought toned by contact with the world. In 1891, she published a volume of poems.

On September 29, 1887, she married Charles G. Van Fleet (b. 1847, Benton Township, Lackawanna County, Pennsylvania), a lawyer and a man of literary tastes who served as mayor of Boulder, Colorado. Their home was in Troy.

Ellen Oliver Van Fleet, a member of an old Troy, Pennsylvania family, died May 8, 1893, and was buried at Troy's Oak Hill Cemetery.

== Selected works ==
=== Hymns ===
- "The Wanderer's Prayer"
- "Come, raise your flag, reformers"
- "The door of God's mercy is open"
- "They are winging, they are winging"
- "We are only boys in stature"
- "With temperance banner wide unfurled"
