= Andrew Moscrip =

American politician

Andrew S. Moscrip

Member of the Pennsylvania House of Representatives from the 110th district
- In office January 7, 1969 – November 30, 1972
- Preceded by: District Created
- Succeeded by: David Turner

Member of the Pennsylvania House of Representatives from the Bradford County district
- In office January 6, 1953 – November 30, 1968

Personal details
- Born: March 17, 1915 Towanda Twp., Bradford County, Pennsylvania
- Died: January 18, 1978 (aged 62)
- Party: Republican

Andrew Stewart Moscrip (March 17, 1915 – January 18, 1978) was a former Republican member of the Pennsylvania House of Representatives.
