= Troy Public High School =

- U.S. National Register of Historic Places
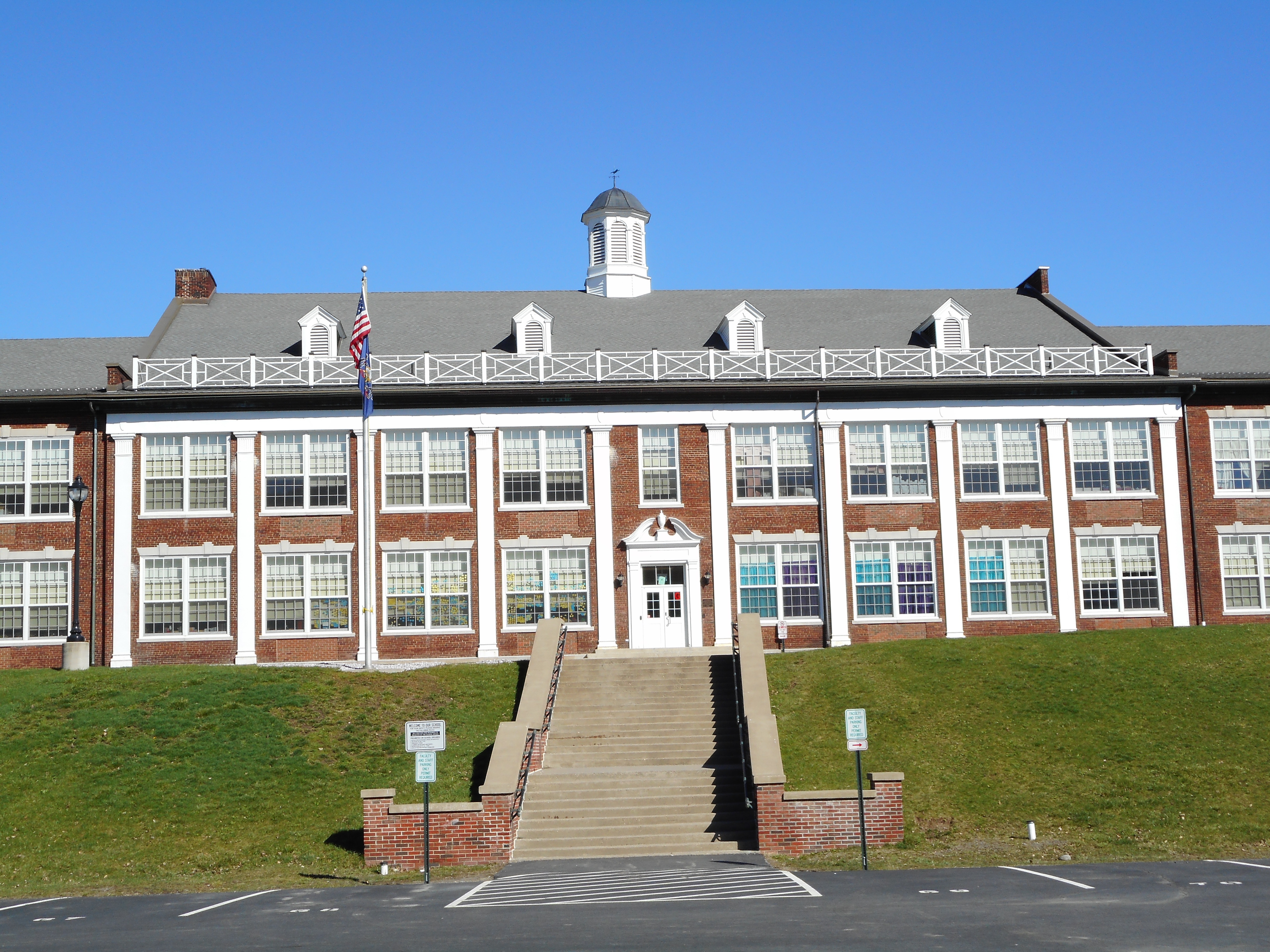

- Location within Pennsylvania Location within the United States
- Location: 250 High St., Troy, Pennsylvania
- Coordinates: 41°47′21″N 76°47′8″W
- Area: 3.9 acres (1.6 ha)
- Built: 1923-1924, 1936, 1939, 1954
- Architect: Lawrie and Lappley; et al.
- Architectural style: Colonial Revival
- NRHP reference No.: 02000067
- Added to NRHP: February 20, 2002

Troy Public High School, also known as Troy Area Senior High School and Troy High School, is an historic high school building in Troy, Bradford County, Pennsylvania, United States.

It was added to the National Register of Historic Places in 2002.

== History and architectural features ==
This historic structure is a two-and-one-half-story, Colonial Revival-style building that is roughly "E-shaped and measures 435 feet wide and 165 feet deep. It has red brick exterior walls and the front facade features a central pilastered block of nine bays, with ten Doric order pilasters. The building is topped by an octagonal cupola.

The original building was built between 1923 and 1924, and was then enlarged incrementally with wings on each end in 1936 and 1939, and, in 1954, with an enlarged gymnasium/library and new auditorium.

== Gallery ==
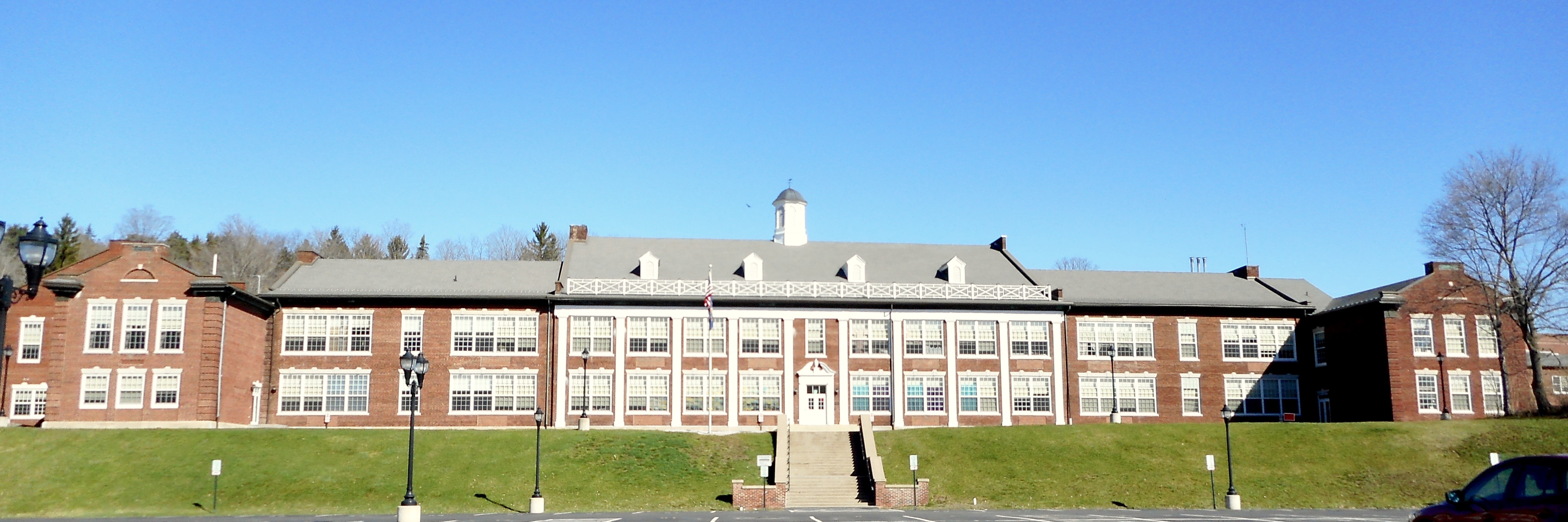
Troy High School

== Notable alumni ==
- Roger A. Madigan (1930–2018), Pennsylvania state senator and representative
- Don Richmond (1919–1981), professional baseball player
