= Roger A. Madigan =

American politician

Member of the Pennsylvania House of Representatives from the 110th district
- In office January 4, 1977 – November 30, 1984
- Preceded by: David Turner
- Succeeded by: J. Scot Chadwick

Member of the Pennsylvania Senate from the 23rd district
- In office January 3, 1985 – November 30, 2008
- Preceded by: Henry Hager
- Succeeded by: Eugene Yaw

Personal details
- Born: February 25, 1930 Luthers Mills, Pennsylvania, U.S.
- Died: June 2, 2018 (aged 88) Harrisburg, Pennsylvania, U.S.
- Party: Republican
- Education: Penn State University
- Profession: Dairy farmer Insurance underwriter

Roger A. Madigan (February 25, 1930 – June 2, 2018) was an American politician from Pennsylvania who served as a Republican member of the Pennsylvania House of Representatives for the 110th district from 1976 to 1984 and the Pennsylvania State Senate for the 23rd District from 1985 to 2009.

== Early life and education ==
Madigan was born in Luthers Mills, Pennsylvania, to Albert E. and Ada Madigan. He graduated from Troy High School and received a B.S. degree in dairy production from Pennsylvania State University in 1951.

He worked as a dairy farmer from 1951 to 1964 and as an insurance underwriter from 1964 to 1977.

== Career ==
Madigan served as a member of the Pennsylvania House of Representatives for the 110th district from 1976 to 1984 and the Pennsylvania State Senate for the 23rd District from 1985 to 2009.

He served as a member of the Penn State Board of Trustees for agricultural studies from 1979 to 2001 and the Pennsylvania College of Technology board of directors from 1991 to 2008.

He died on June 2, 2018, in Harrisburg, Pennsylvania.

== Legacy ==
The Roger and Peggy Madigan Library at Pennsylvania College of Technology was partly named in his honor.

Pennsylvania House of Representatives
Preceded by David M. Turner	Member of the Pennsylvania House of Representatives from the 110th district 1977-1984	Succeeded by J. Scot Chadwick
Pennsylvania State Senate
Preceded by Henry G. Hager	Member of the Pennsylvania Senate, 23rd district 1985-2008	Succeeded by Eugene Yaw
