= Towanda Historic District =

Historic district in Pennsylvania, United States

- U.S. National Register of Historic Places
- U.S. Historic district
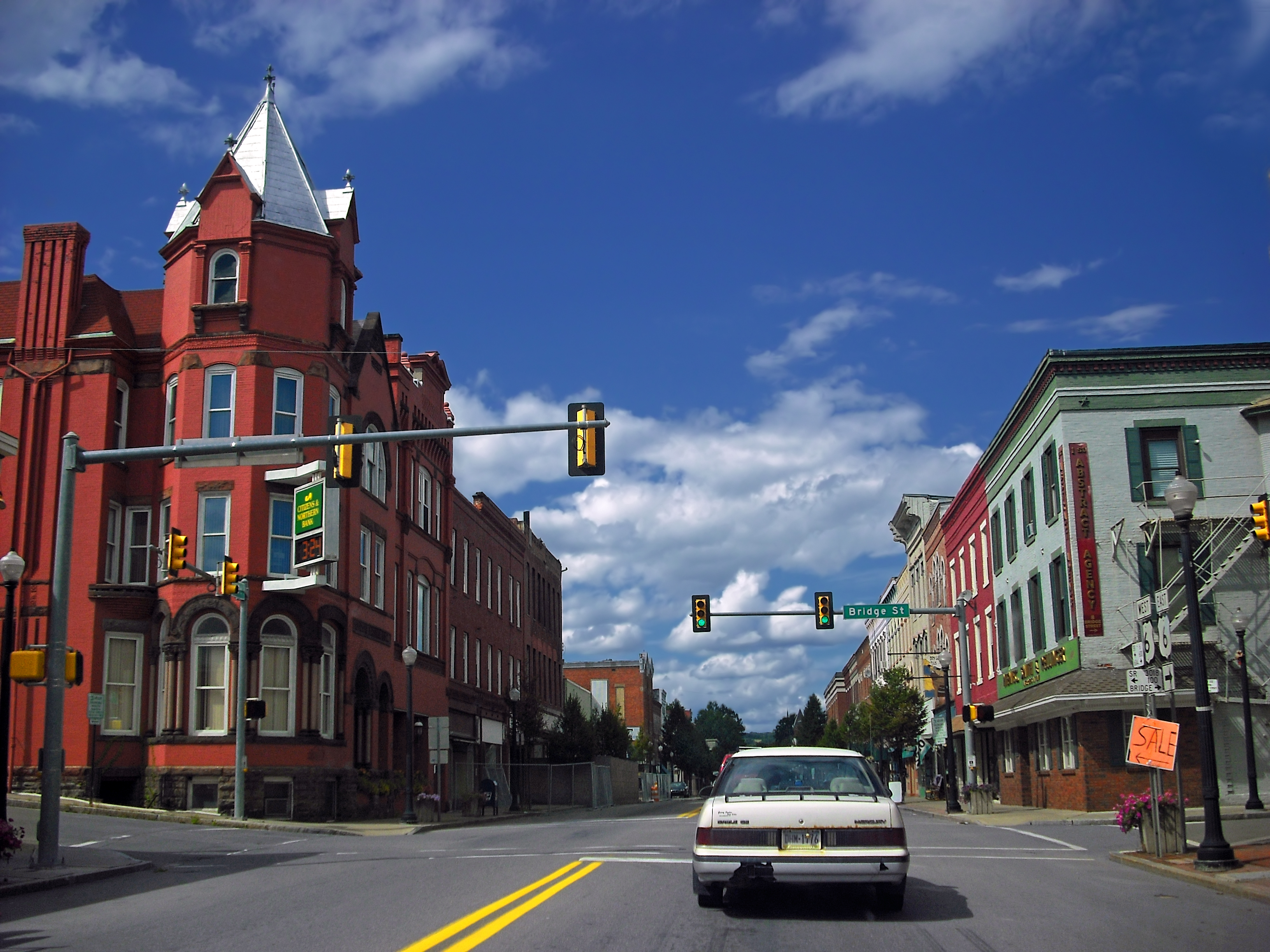
- Main Street, August 2008

- Location within Pennsylvania Location within the United States
- Location: Roughly bounded by Elizabeth, Fourth and Kingsbury Sts. and the Susquehanna R., Towanda, Pennsylvania
- Coordinates: 41°46′19″N 76°26′47″W
- Area: 145 acres (59 ha)
- Architectural style: Classical Revival, Greek Revival, Queen Anne
- NRHP reference No.: 92000394
- Added to NRHP: May 7, 1992

The Towanda Historic District is a national historic district that is located in Towanda, Bradford County, Pennsylvania.

It was added to the National Register of Historic Places in 1992.

== Historyand architectural features ==
This district encompasses 440 contributing buildings and one contributing site that are located in the central business district and surrounding residential areas of Towanda. The buildings date roughly to between 1830 and 1900, and include notable examples of vernacular and high-style Greek Revival, Queen Anne, and Classical Revival-style architecture.

Notable buildings include the William Means House (1816), the Towanda Academy (1835), the Dr. Samuel Huston House (c. 1835), the Ulysses Mercur House (1851), the David Cash House (1845), the Presbyterian Church (1855), Saints Peter and Paul Church (1869-1879), the Hale Opera House (1886), the Episcopal Church (1889), Citizens National Bank (1888), the Kingsbury/Chamberlain Building (1887), the Dan Turner House (1897), a public library (1897), and the Riverside Cemetery. Also located in the district but separately listed is the Bradford County Courthouse.
