= Bradford County Courthouse =

- U.S. National Register of Historic Places
- U.S. Historic district – Contributing property
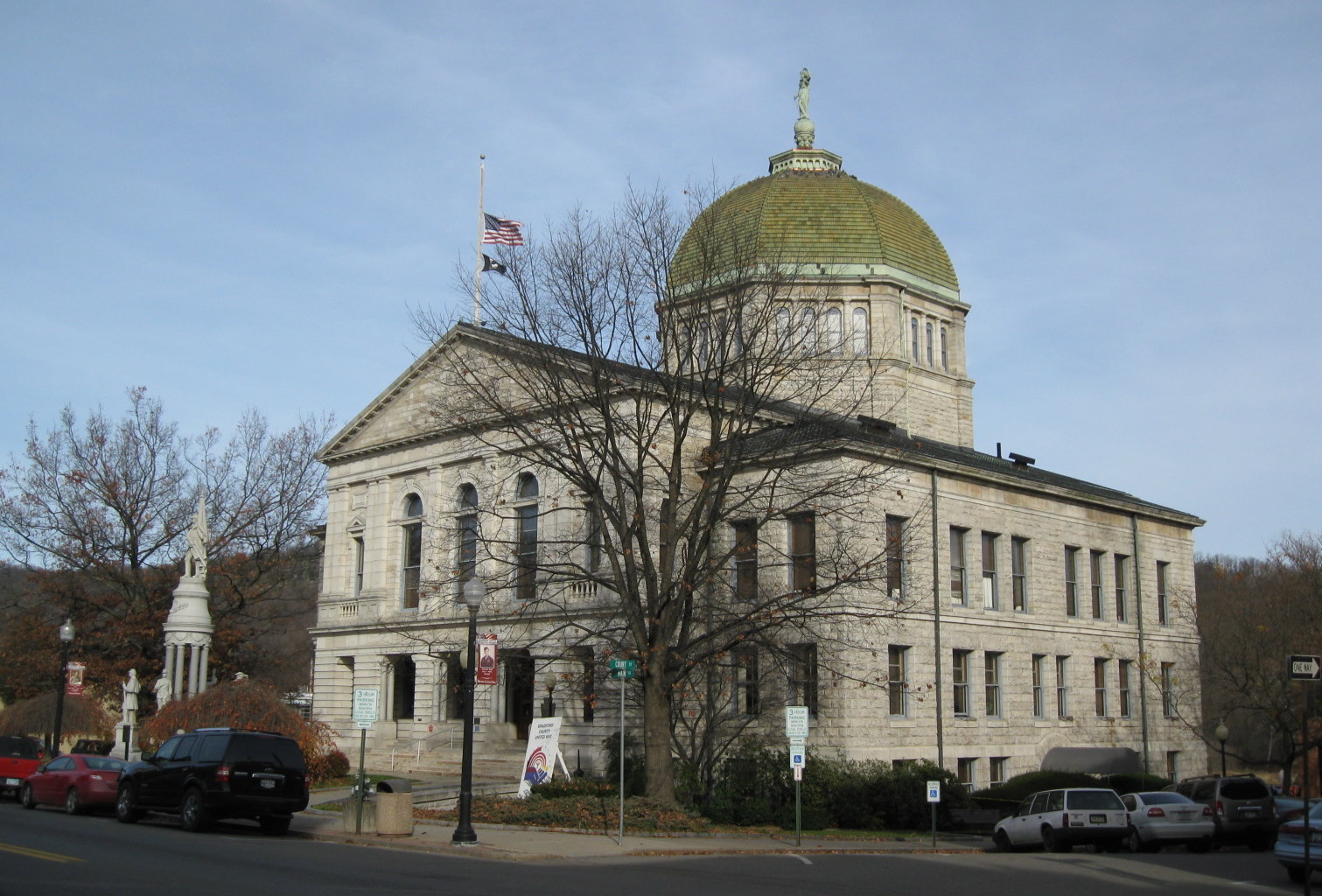
- Bradford County Courthouse, November 2009

- Location within Pennsylvania Location within the United States
- Interactive map showing the location for Bradford County Courthouse
- Location: 301 Main St., Towanda, Pennsylvania
- Coordinates: 41°45′59″N 76°26′21″W
- Area: 4.7 acres (1.9 ha)
- Built: 1847-1848, 1896-1898, c. 1905
- Built by: Bradley, Thomas
- Architect: Lehman & Schmitt
- Architectural style: Classical Revival, Renaissance
- Part of: Towanda Historic District (ID92000394)
- NRHP reference No.: 86003573

Significant dates
- Added to NRHP: January 6, 1987
- Designated CP: May 7, 1992

Bradford County Courthouse is a historic courthouse building located at Towanda, Bradford County, Pennsylvania. It was built between 1896 and 1898, and is a four-story, cruciform-shaped building, with Classical Revival and Renaissance Revival-style design influences. It has rusticated sandstone exterior walls and a 50-foot-diameter octagonal dome atop the roof. It features an entrance portico supported by Tuscan order columns. Also on the property is a modest two-story brick annex building that was built in 1847–1848. Also on the property is a large soldiers' monument, erected about 1905.

It was added to the National Register of Historic Places in 1987.

== Gallery ==
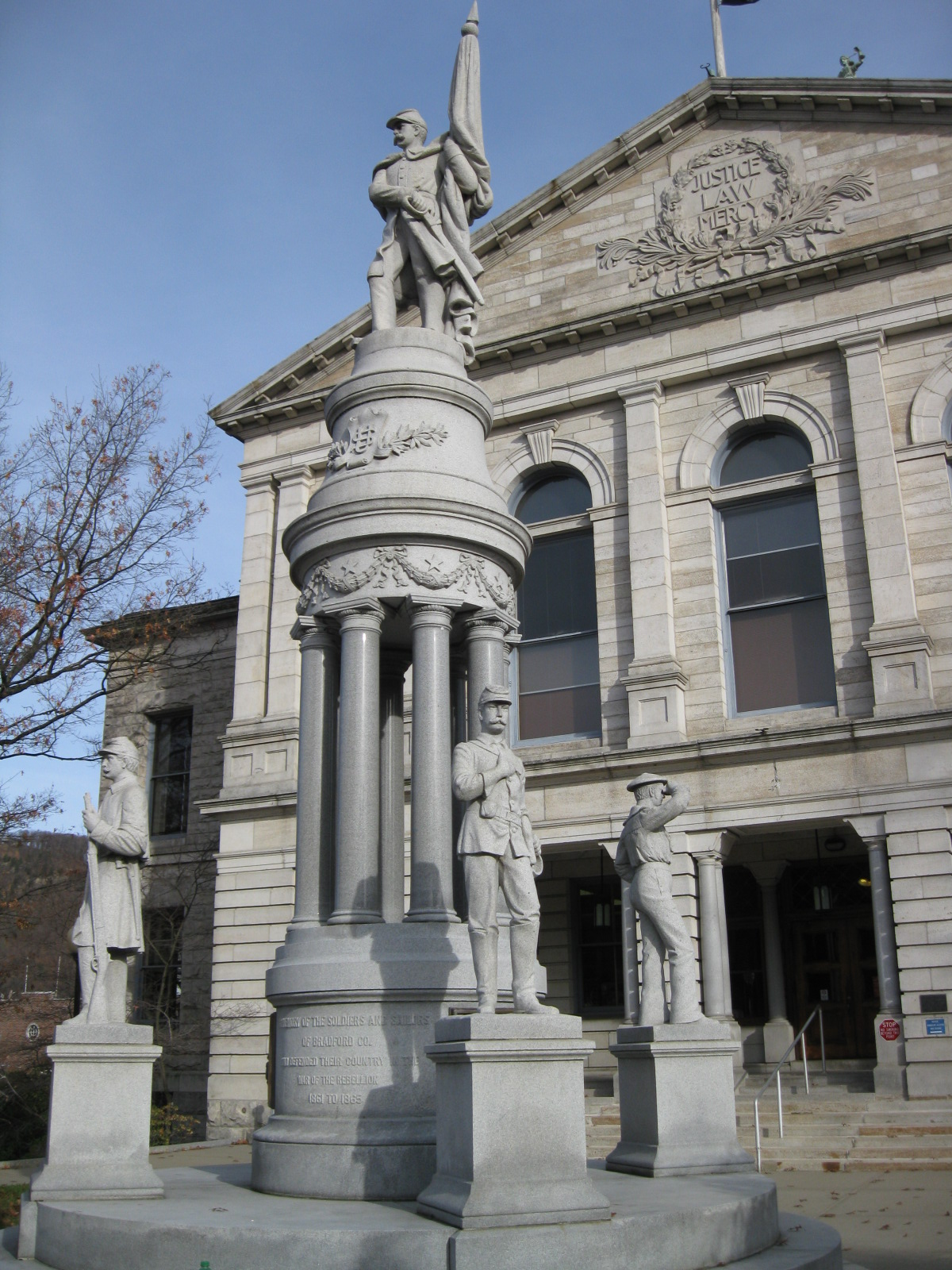
Bradford County Soldiers Memorial, November 2009

== See also ==
- List of state and county courthouses in Pennsylvania
