= Methodist Episcopal Church of Burlington =

Historic church in Pennsylvania, United States

- U.S. National Register of Historic Places
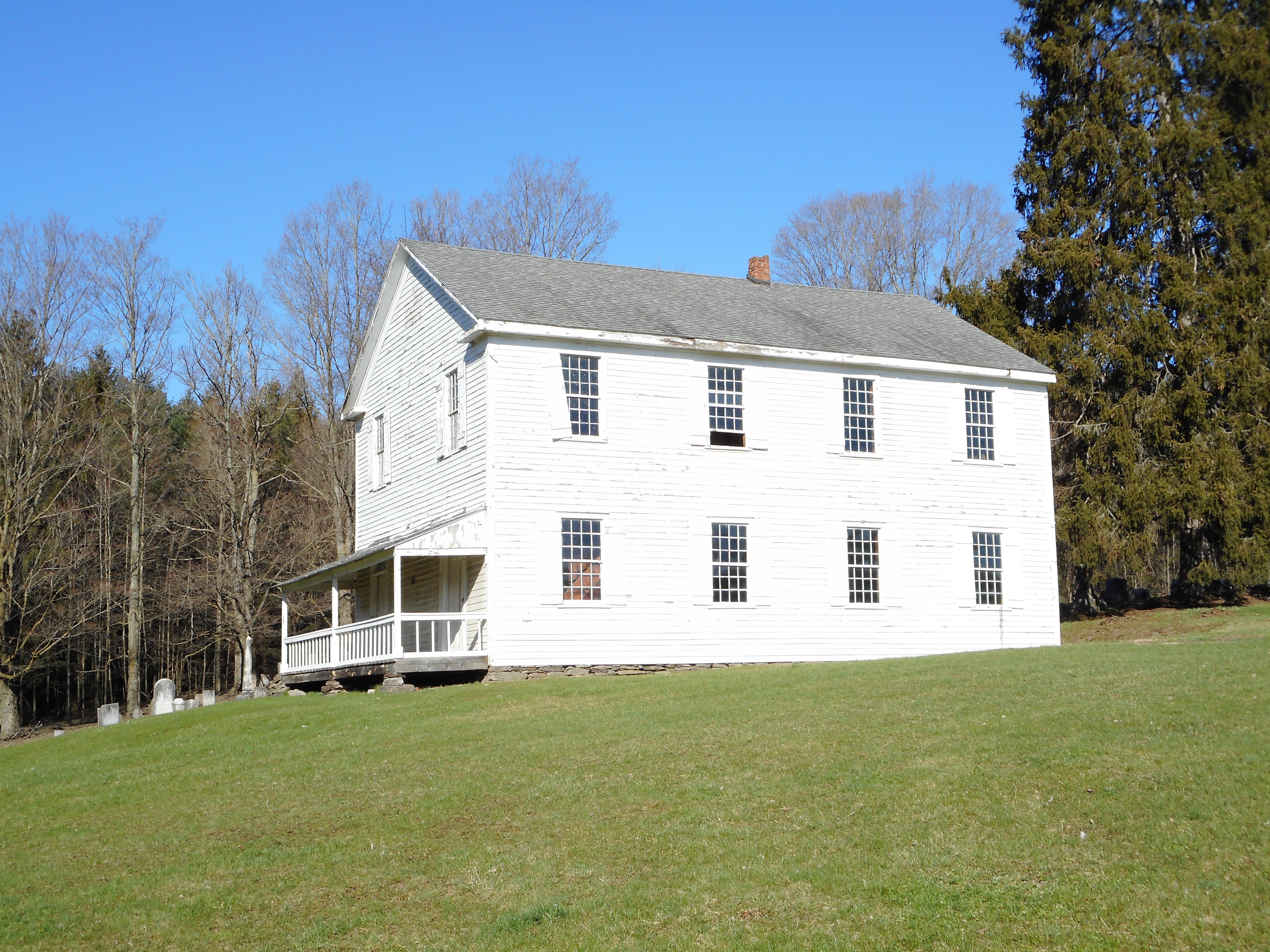
- Church in 2017

- Location within Pennsylvania Location within the United States
- Location: US 6 at Township Rd. 357, West Burlington, Pennsylvania
- Coordinates: 41°46′24″N 76°37′53″W
- Area: less than one acre
- Built: 1822
- Architectural style: Greek Revival
- NRHP reference No.: 89002280
- Added to NRHP: January 4, 1990

The Methodist Episcopal Church of Burlington, also known as the "Old Burlington Church," is an historic Methodist Episcopal church that is located on US 6 at Township Road 357 in West Burlington, Bradford County, Pennsylvania, United States.

It was added to the National Register of Historic Places in 1989.

== History and architectural features ==
Built in 1822, this historic structure is a two-story, rectangular, frame, front-gabled building. It measures thirty feet by forty-five feet. The interior features an elevated octagonal pulpit. Surrounding the church is a contributing cemetery.

== Gallery ==
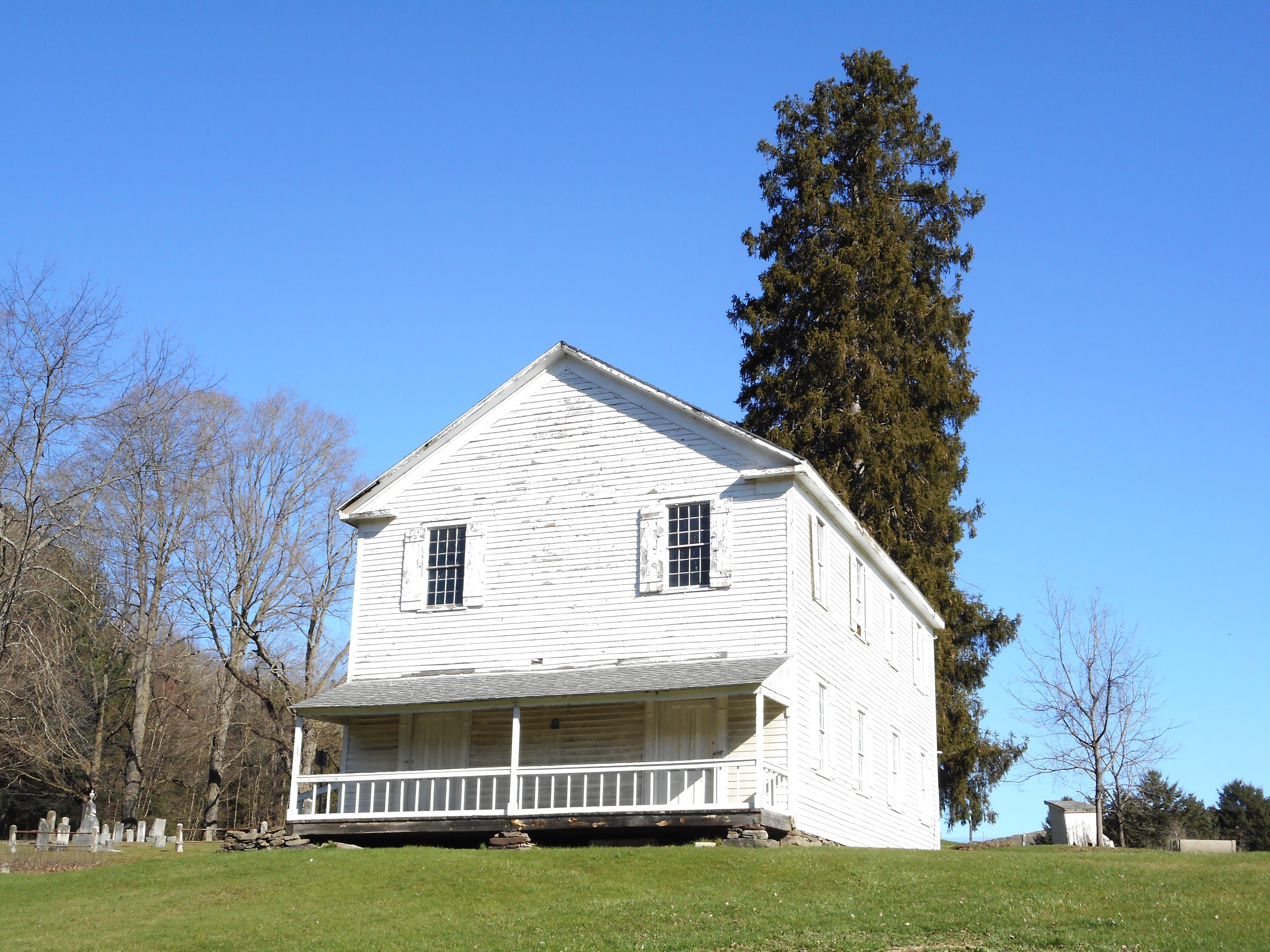
Front of church
