= Universalist Meeting House of Sheshequin =

Historic church in Pennsylvania, United States

- U.S. National Register of Historic Places
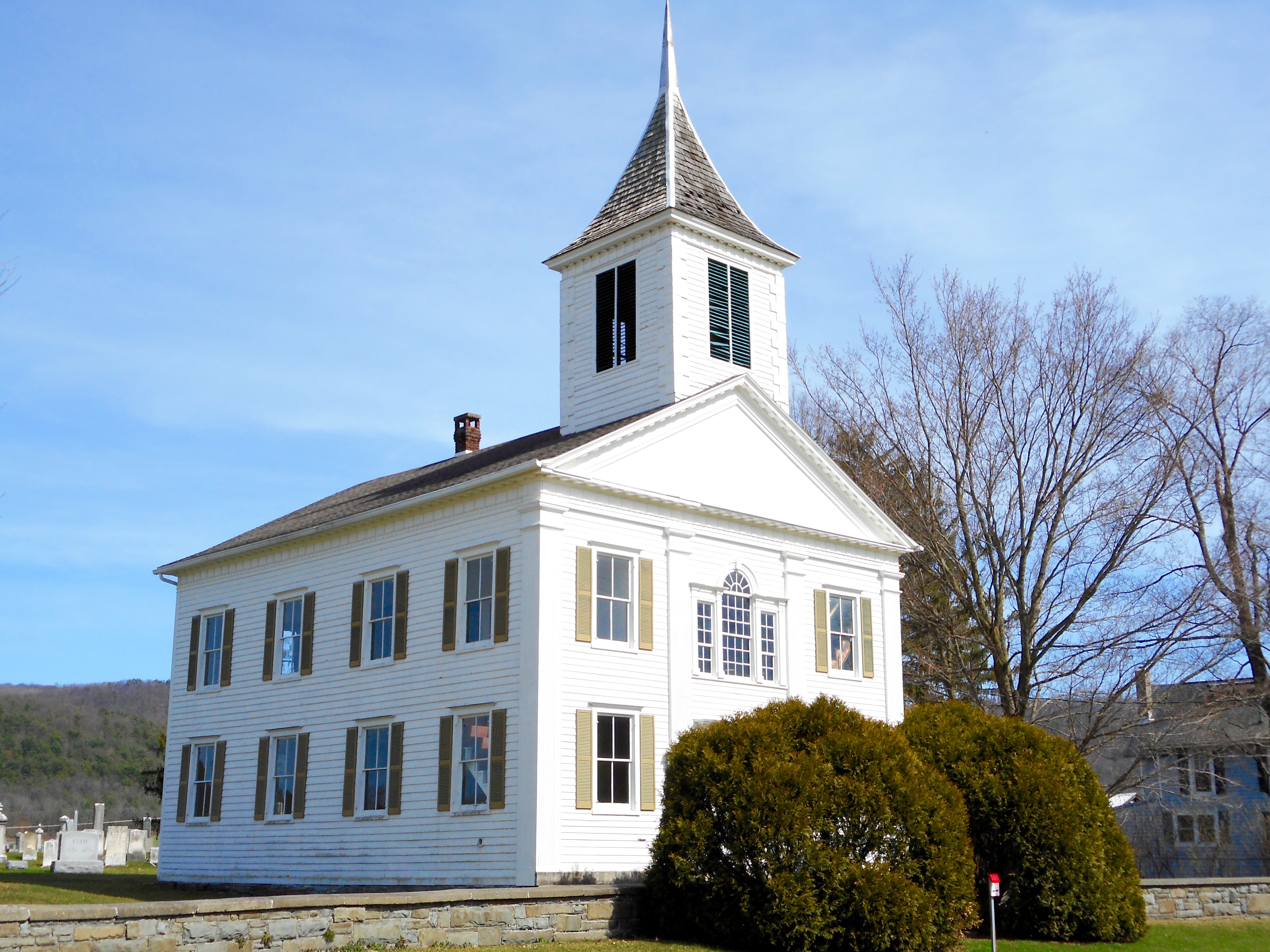

- Location within Pennsylvania Location within the United States
- Location: 6752 Sheshequin Road, Sheshequin, Pennsylvania
- Coordinates: 41°52′29″N 76°29′59″W
- Area: less than one acre
- Built: 1827
- Architectural style: Federal
- NRHP reference No.: 13000742
- Added to NRHP: September 18, 2013

The Universalist Meeting House of Sheshequin is a historic church, built in 1827 in Bradford County, Pennsylvania. The church is currently used during the months of July and August by the Unitarian Universalist Church of Athens and Sheshequin.

Surrounding the church is a contributing cemetery. The cemetery predates the meeting house by about 30 years, but was operated together with the church from 1827 to 1914.

It was added to the National Register of Historic Places in 2013.

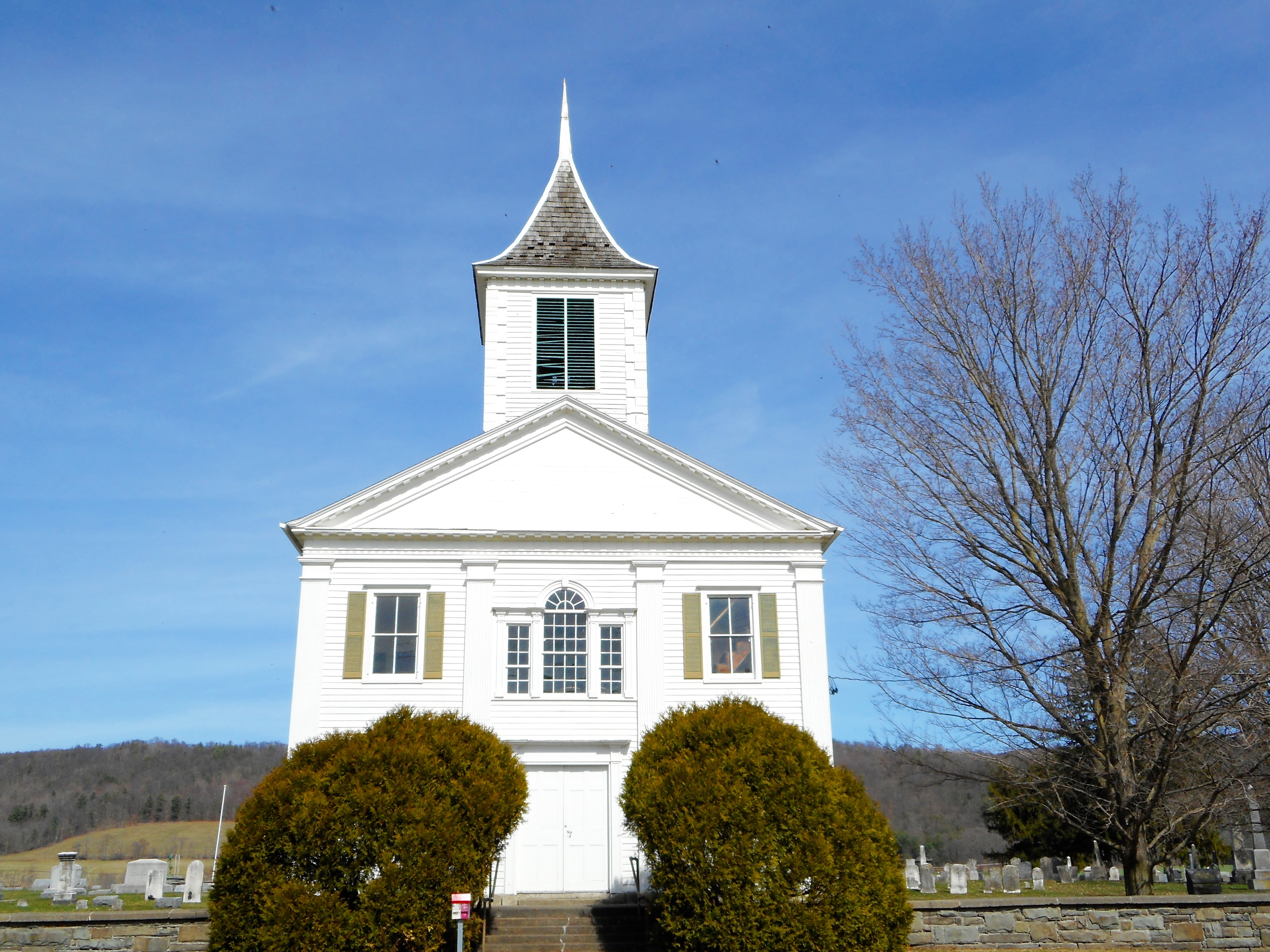
From the west

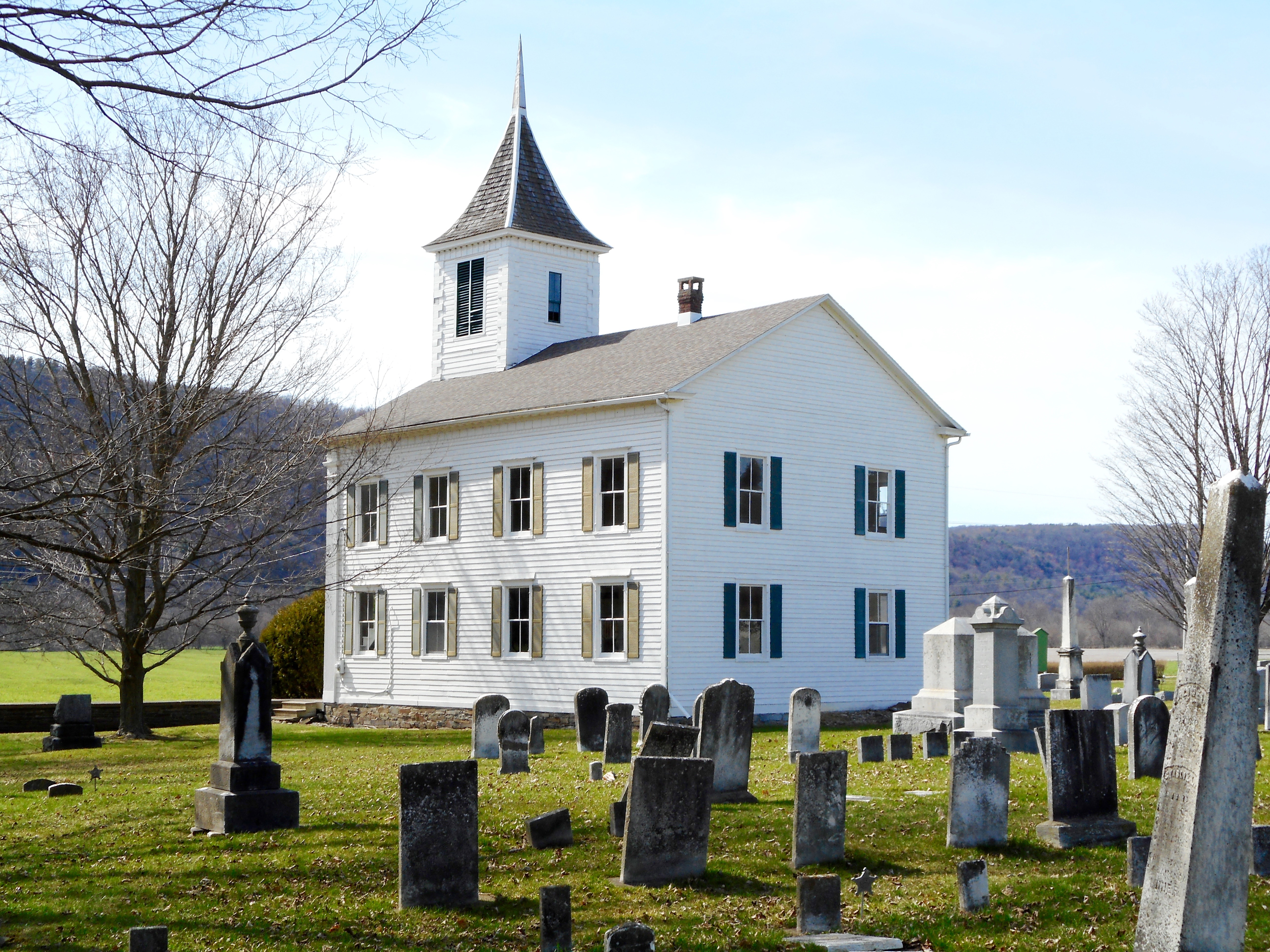
From the southeast
