= Van Dyne Civic Building =

- U.S. National Register of Historic Places
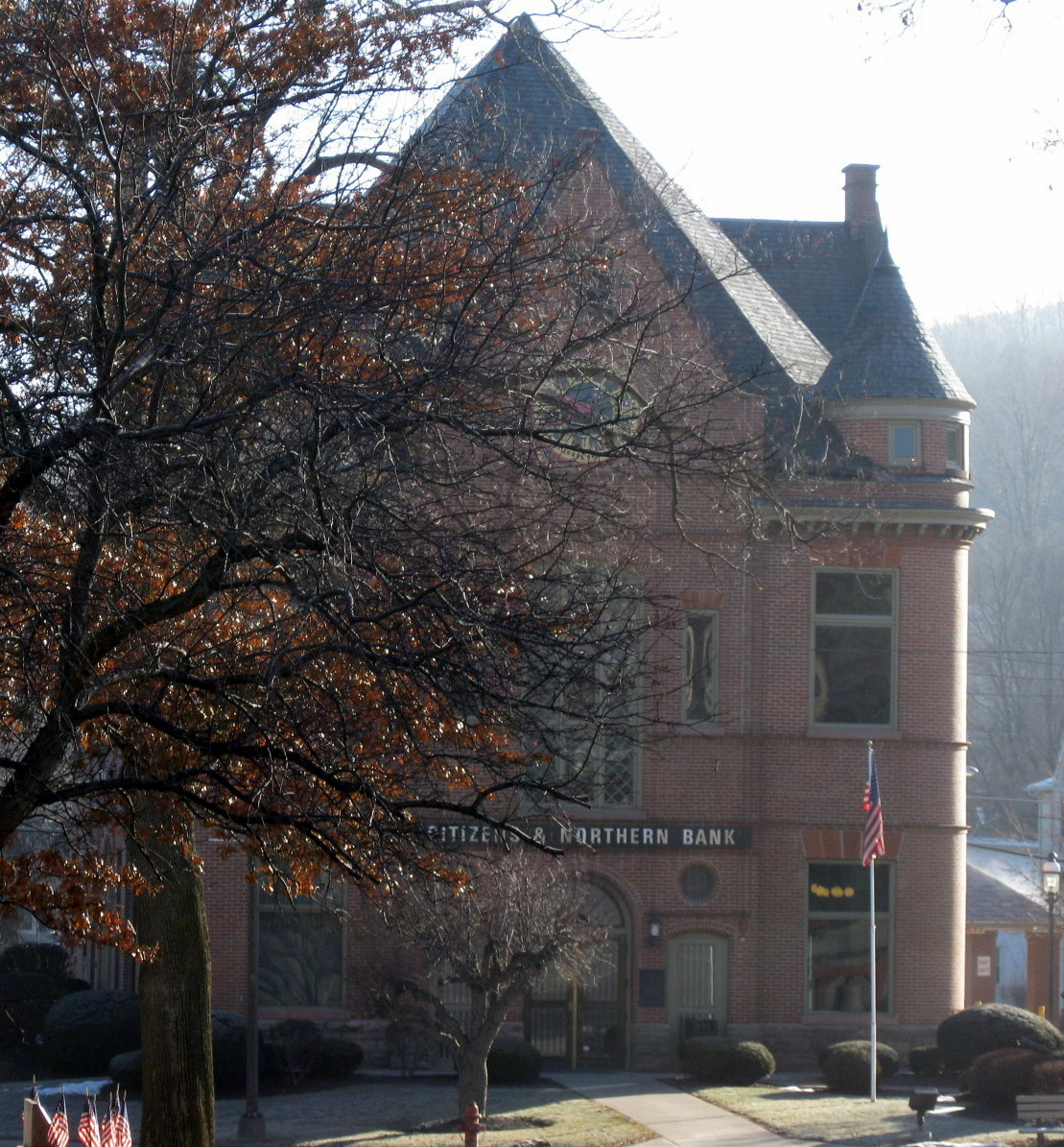
- Van Dyne Civic Building, January 2010

- Location within Pennsylvania Location within the United States
- Location: 64 Elmira St., Troy, Pennsylvania
- Coordinates: 41°47′11″N 76°47′10″W
- Area: less than one acre
- Built: 1894
- Architectural style: Richardsonian Romanesque
- NRHP reference No.: 74001754
- Added to NRHP: January 21, 1974

The Van Dyne Civic Building, also known as The Court House, is an historic courthouse building that is located in Troy, Bradford County, Pennsylvania, United States.

It was added to the National Register of Historic Places in 1974.

== History and architectural features ==
Built in 1894, this historic structure is a two-and-one-half-story, rectangular building that measures fifty feet wide and eighty-four feet deep. It has red brick exterior walls and sits on a cut stone foundation. The front facade features an entrance arch reflecting Richardsonian Romanesque-style design influences. It also has pointed gable ends, a bracketed cornice, and two tower at either end of the front facade.The building originally served as a courthouse for the western portion of Bradford County. It also originally housed a bank and insurance company. Court sessions ended in 1923. In 1916, it was purchased by E. Everitt Van Dyne, who deeded it to the school district and refurbished it as a civic center for the community. Over time, it has also housed the post office and library.
