= Troy, Pennsylvania =

Borough in Pennsylvania, US

- Borough
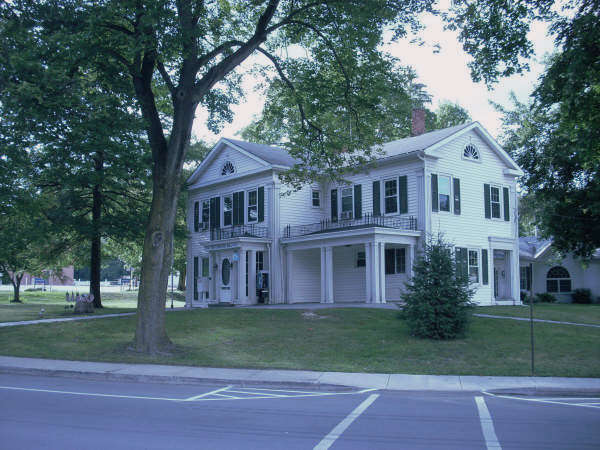
- Troy Borough Hall

- Location of Troy in Bradford County, Pennsylvania.

- Location of Troy in the state of Pennsylvania
- Coordinates: 41°46′56″N 76°47′22″W
- Country: United States
- State: Pennsylvania
- County: Bradford

Area
  - Total: 0.77 sq mi (1.99 km^{2})
  - Land: 0.76 sq mi (1.98 km^{2})
  - Water: 0.0039 sq mi (0.01 km^{2})
- Elevation: 1,099 ft (335 m)

Population (2010)
  - Total: 1,354
  - Estimate (2019): 1,233
  - Density: 1,608.8/sq mi (621.17/km^{2})
- Time zone: UTC-5 (Eastern (EST))
  - Summer (DST): UTC-4 (EDT)
- Zip Code: 16947
- Area code: 570
- FIPS code: 42-77584
- Website: troyborough.com

Troy is a borough in Bradford County, Pennsylvania, United States. It is part of Northeastern Pennsylvania. As of the 2020 census, Troy had a population of 1,249. Children residing in the borough are assigned to attend the Troy Area School District.

== History ==
The borough of Troy was incorporated in 1845 from Troy Township, which encircles the borough. Originally part of Luzerne County, the borough's future location (called Lansingburgh) became part of Ontario (now Bradford) County when it was created in 1810. The Troy Public High School and Van Dyne Civic Building are listed on the National Register of Historic Places.

== Geography ==
Troy is located in western Bradford County at 41°46′56″N 76°47′22″W (41.782180, -76.789561). It is surrounded by Troy Township but is separate from it. U.S. Route 6 passes through the borough, leading east 20 miles (32 km) to Towanda, the county seat, and west 17 miles (27 km) to Mansfield. Pennsylvania Route 14 turns south from US-6 in the center of Troy, leading 10 miles (16 km) to Canton; the highway turns north from US-6 just east of Troy and leads 25 miles (40 km) to Elmira, New York.

According to the United States Census Bureau, Troy has a total area of 0.77 square miles (2.0 km^{2}), all land.

== Demographics ==
Historical population
Census	Pop.	Note	%±
1850	480		—
1860	757		57.7%
1870	1,081		42.8%
1880	1,241		14.8%
1890	1,307		5.3%
1900	1,450		10.9%
1910	1,288		−11.2%
1920	1,419		10.2%
1930	1,190		−16.1%
1940	1,228		3.2%
1950	1,371		11.6%
1960	1,478		7.8%
1970	1,315		−11.0%
1980	1,381		5.0%
1990	1,262		−8.6%
2000	1,508		19.5%
2010	1,354		−10.2%
2020	1,249		−7.8%

At the 2010 census there were 1,354 people, 571 households, and 327 families residing in the borough. The population density was 1,923.2 inhabitants per square mile (742.6/km^{2}). There were 617 housing units at an average density of 786.9 per square mile (303.8/km^{2}). The racial makeup of the borough was 98.34% White, 0.27% African American, 0.13% Native American, 0.73% Asian, 0.27% from other races, and 0.27% from two or more races. Hispanic or Latino of any race were 0.66%.

There were 581 households, 26.2% had children under the age of 18 living with them, 43.0% were married couples living together, 10.3% had a female householder with no husband present, and 43.7% were non-families. 37.2% of households were made up of individuals, and 22.5% were one person aged 65 or older. The average household size was 2.30 and the average family size was 3.00.

In the borough the population was spread out, with 20.1% under the age of 18, 8.6% from 18 to 24, 28.6% from 25 to 44, 23.3% from 45 to 64, and 19.4% 65 or older. The median age was 41 years. For every 100 females there were 70.2 males. For every 100 females age 18 and over, there were 63.3 males.

The median household income was $27,426 and the median family income was $41,667. Males had a median income of $30,625 versus $20,972 for females. The per capita income for the borough was $16,963. About 8.2% of families and 21.1% of the population were below the poverty line, including 13.0% of those under age 18 and 18.6% of those age 65 or over.

== Notable people ==
- Mary Canfield Ballard (1852–1927), poet and hymnwriter
- Pat Ballard (1899–1960), songwriter who composed "Mr. Sandman" and "(Oh Baby Mine) I Get So Lonely"
- Henry P. Davison (1867–1922), banker and first Chairman of the International League of Red Cross Societies
- Samuel M. Smead (1830–1898), newspaper editor and politician
- Ellen Oliver Van Fleet (1842-1893), poet and hymnwriter
