= Athens Historic District (Athens, Pennsylvania) =

Historic district in Pennsylvania, United States

- U.S. National Register of Historic Places
- U.S. Historic district
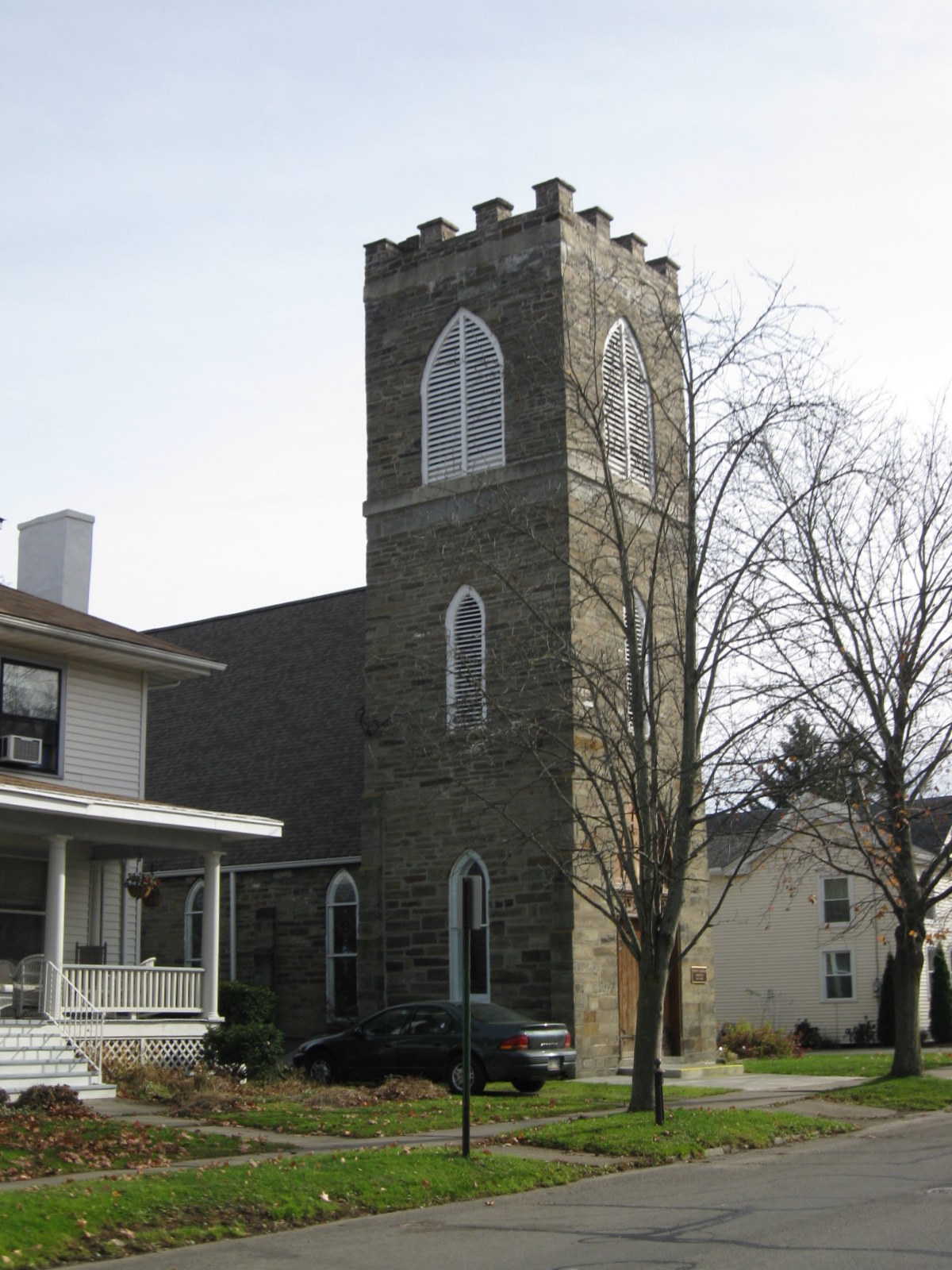
- Trinity Episcopal Church in November 2009

- Location within Pennsylvania Location within the United States
- Location: Roughly bounded by Elm and Locust Sts., 772 S. Main St., and the Chemung and Susquehanna Rivers in Athens, Pennsylvania
- Coordinates: 41°57′02″N 76°31′00″W
- Area: 88 acres (36 ha)
- Architect: Pierce & Bickford et al.
- Architectural style: Queen Anne, Greek Revival
- NRHP reference No.: 04000612
- Added to NRHP: June 18, 2004

Athens Historic District, also known as Tioga Point Historic District, is a national historic district located at Athens, Pennsylvania, United States. The district includes 97 contributing buildings and 1 contributing site in a primarily residential area of Athens. The buildings date between about 1801 and 1935, and include notable examples of vernacular and high style Greek Revival and Queen Anne style architecture. Also located in the district are the First Presbyterian Church (1881), Trinity Episcopal Church (1860-1861), and Riverside Cemetery / Old Athens Cemetery. Located in the district and separately listed are the Protection of the Flag Monument and Spalding Memorial Library-Tioga Point Museum.

It was added to the National Register of Historic Places in 2004.
