= Spalding Memorial Library-Tioga Point Museum =

- U.S. National Register of Historic Places
- U.S. Historic district – Contributing property
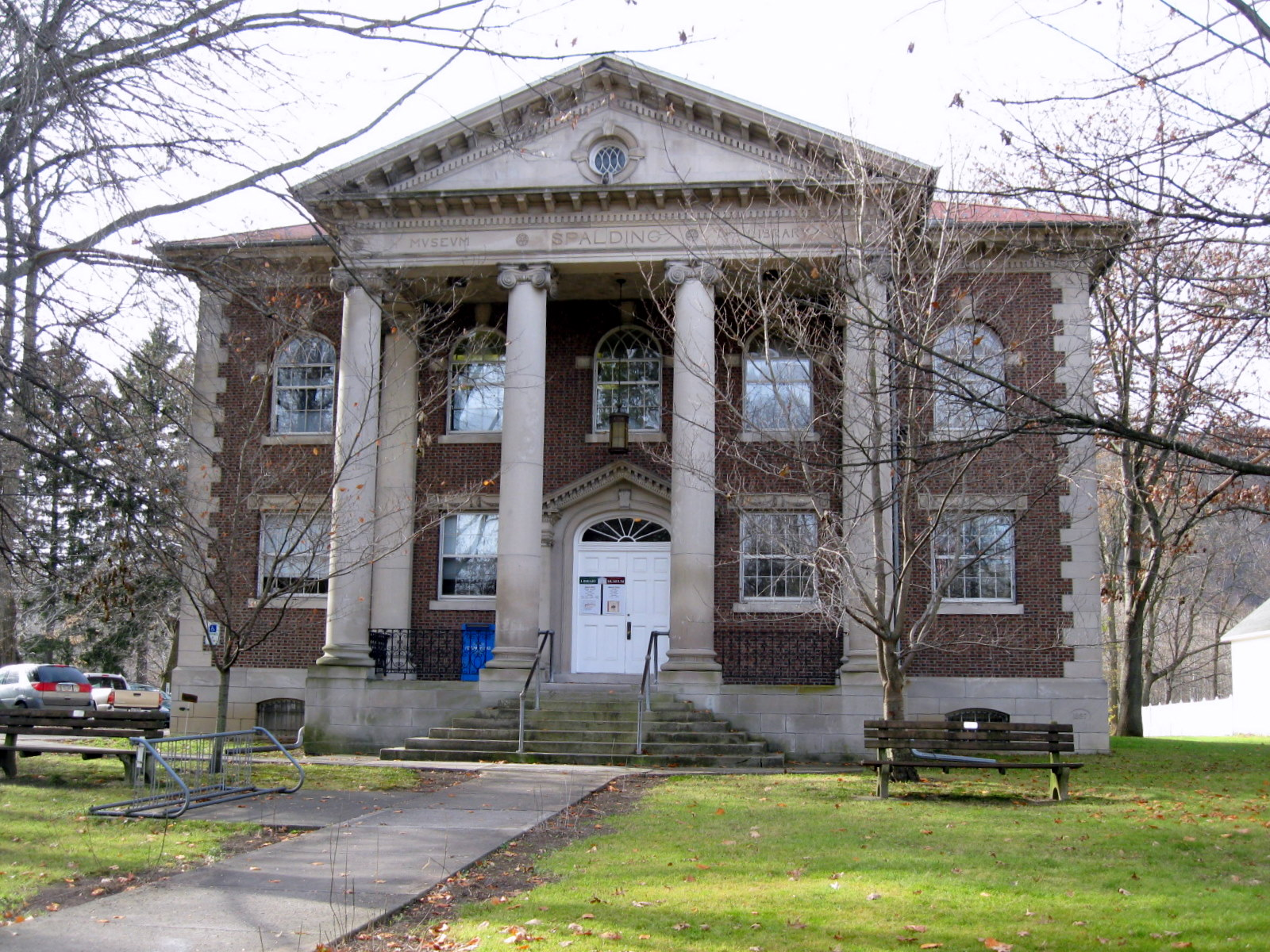
- Spalding Memorial Library-Tioga Point Museum in November 2009

- Location within Pennsylvania Location within the United States
- Location: 724 S. Main St., Athens, Pennsylvania
- Coordinates: 41°57′6″N 76°31′0″W
- Area: 1.3 acres (0.53 ha)
- Built: 1897-1898, 1928
- Architect: Albert Hamilton Kipp; Harry Charles Child (1928 addition)
- Architectural style: Colonial Revival, Classical Revival
- NRHP reference No.: 00000059
- Added to NRHP: February 18, 2000

The Spalding Memorial Library-Tioga Point Museum is an historic library and museum building in Athens, Bradford County, Pennsylvania, United States.

Part of the Athens Historic District, it was added to the National Register of Historic Places in 2000.

== History and architectural features ==
Built between 1897 and 1898, this historic structure is a Colonial Revival/Classical Revival-style civic building. The main section measures 60 by 38 feet (18 by 12 m), and is two-story, brick structure with Indiana limestone trim on a raised basement. It features a central entry pedimented portico reached by a set of stairs and supported by four Ionic order columns. A two-story, rear addition was built in 1928, and measures 43 by 28 feet (13.1 by 8.5 m). An elevator tower was added to it in 1999.
