= French Azilum =

Planned community in Pennsylvania, US

Coordinates: 41.736°N 76.318°W

French Azilum (French: Asile français) was a planned settlement built in 1793 in Bradford County, Pennsylvania for French refugees fleeing the French Revolution and slave uprisings in Saint-Domingue. Several influential Philadelphians, including Stephen Girard, Robert Morris and John Nicholson, Pennsylvania's comptroller general, were sympathetic to the exiles, and also saw a chance to profit financially.

In 1793, they aided in the purchase of 1,600 acres (6 km^{2}) of land in northeastern Pennsylvania, which was then wilderness. An area of 300 acres (1.2 km^{2}) was laid out as a town plot including a 2-acre (8,100 m^{2}) market square, a grid of broad streets and 413 lots, approximately one-half acre each. About 30 log houses were built. A small number of exiles arrived that fall. Some were royalists, loyal to King Louis XVI (guillotined in January 1793) and thus fleeing imprisonment and possible death during the French Revolution. Others came from the French colony of Saint-Domingue (Haiti) where slave uprisings had broken out in 1791, inspired by the Declaration of the Rights of Man and of the Citizen (1789) of the French Assembly. According to legend, Marie Antoinette (continued as titular Queen of France until guillotined in October 1793) and her two surviving children were to settle here.

Soon several small shops, a schoolhouse, a chapel and a theater appeared in the market square. A gristmill, blacksmith shop and a distillery were built, cattle and sheep were kept, and fruit trees and gardens were planted.

The largest building in the colony, La Grande Maison, a two-story log structure, stood 84 feet (26 m) long and 60 feet (18 m) wide. Unproven rumors see it as intended for the Queen. Major social gatherings took place there, and both Talleyrand (who lived in the United States from 1794 to 1796) and Louis Philippe I (who visited Pennsylvania in 1797 and later became King of the French from 1830 to 1848) were entertained here.

The quasi-aristocratic French court did not last. In the late 1790s, after Morris and Nicholson went into bankruptcy and money from French sources dried up, many of the exiles moved to southern cities including Charleston, Savannah and New Orleans. Some returned to Saint-Domingue, and after Napoleon (in power from 1799) made it possible for exiles to return to France, many did. The LaPortes, Homets, LeFevres, Brevosts and D'Autremonts remained in Pennsylvania and settled in local communities. By 1803 French Azilum had passed into history.

None of the more than 50 structures of French Azilum remain. The house and garden plots were absorbed into larger tracts of farmland.

The LaPorte House, built in 1836 by the son of one of the founders of the colony, includes delicately painted ceilings and interior decor which reflect the French influence, and functions as a house museum. An original foundation has been left exposed for public viewing and a reconstructed, relocated log cabin, circa 1790, also serves as a small museum. Guided tours of the LaPorte house take place seasonally, as well as a self-guided tour of over 20 acres (81,000 m^{2}) of the original settlement, including several outbuildings of the LaPorte Farm.

French Azilum is managed by French Azilum, Inc., a non-profit corporation founded in 1954, and is administered by the Pennsylvania Historical and Museum Commission.

== Gallery ==
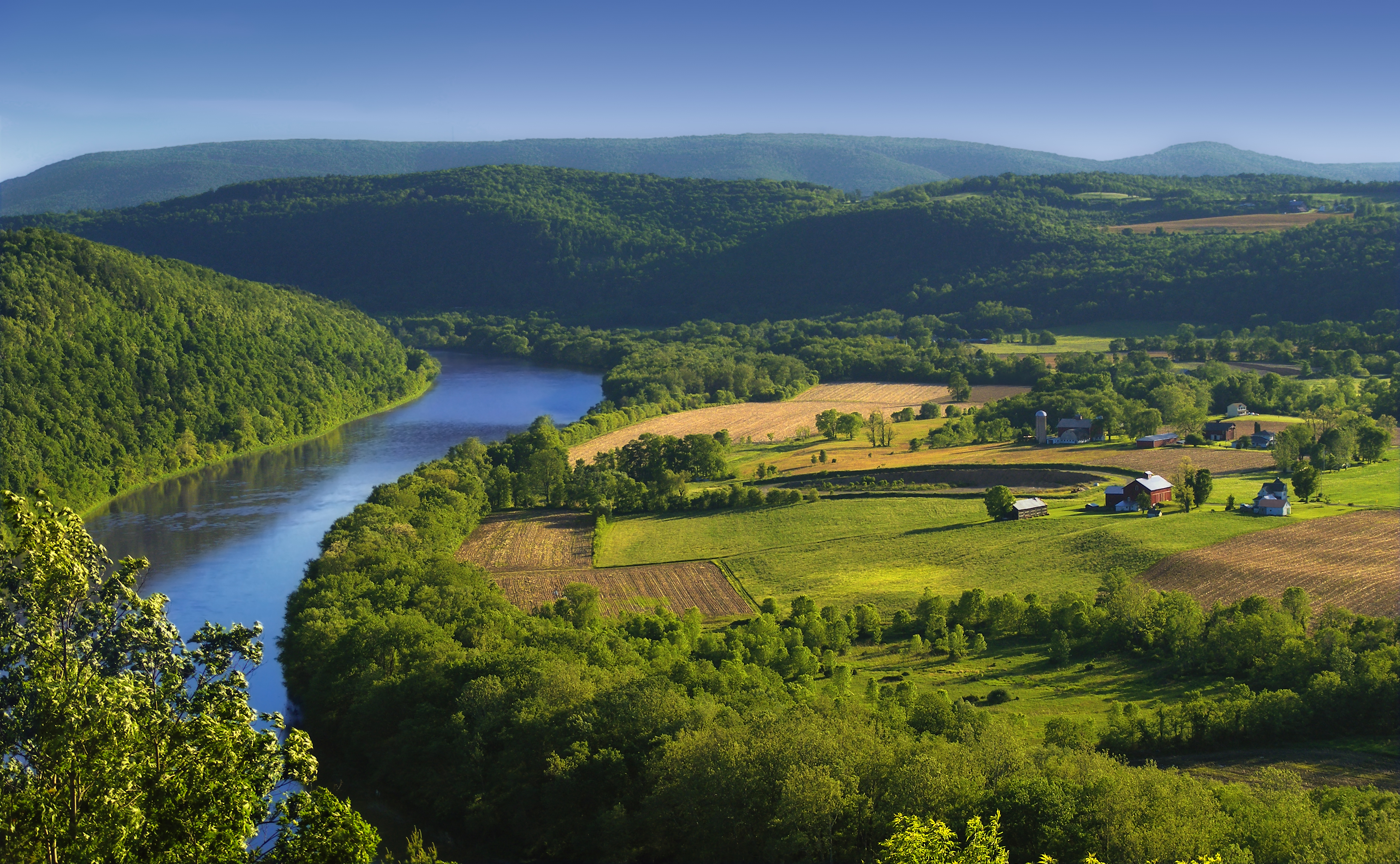

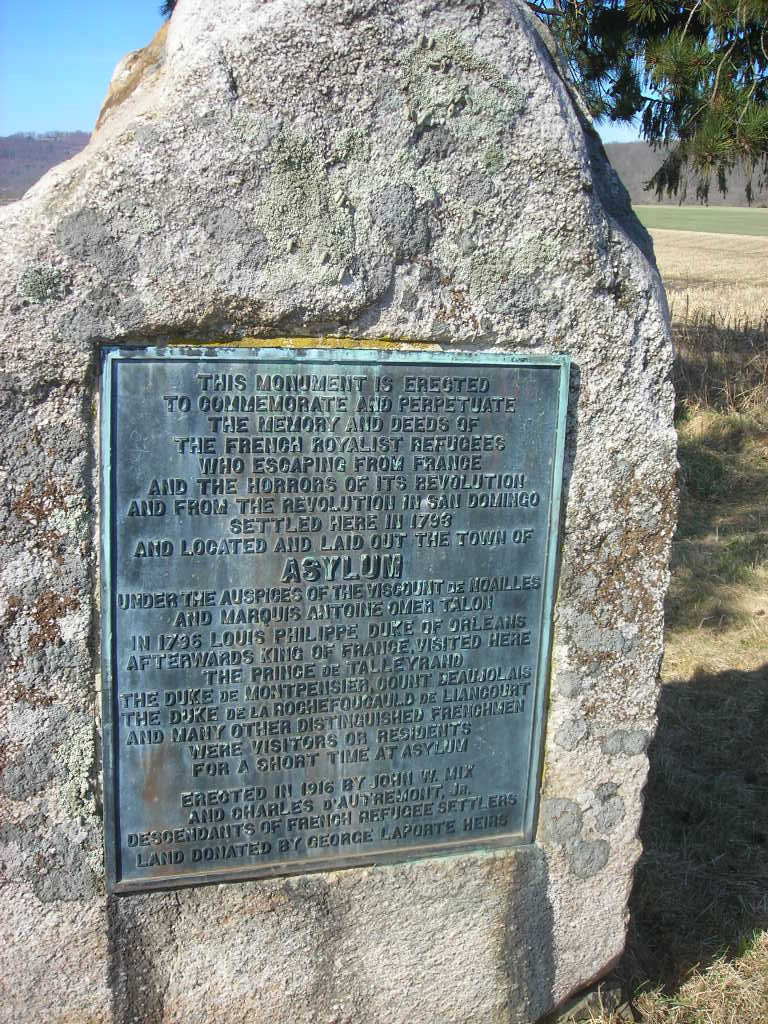

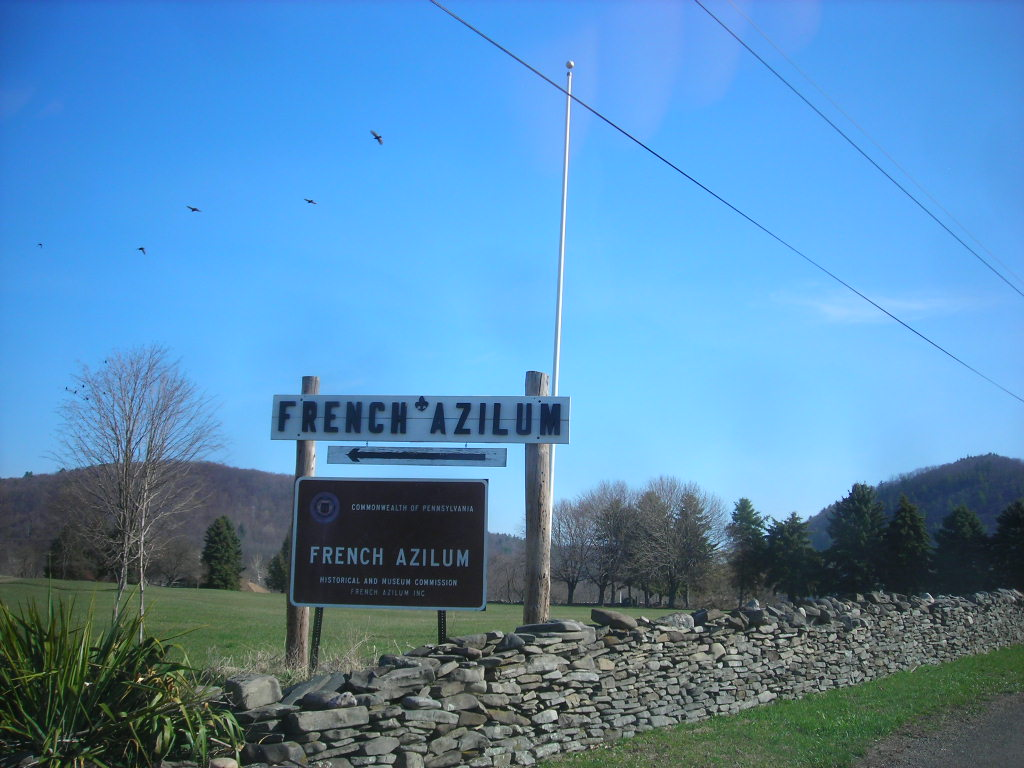

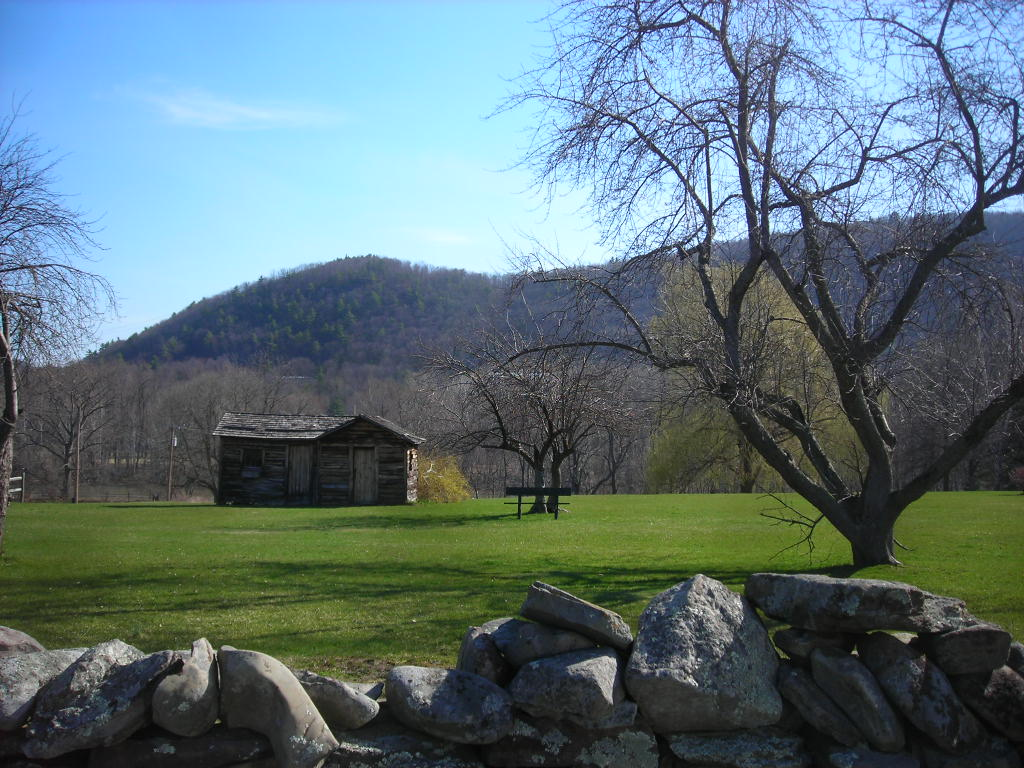

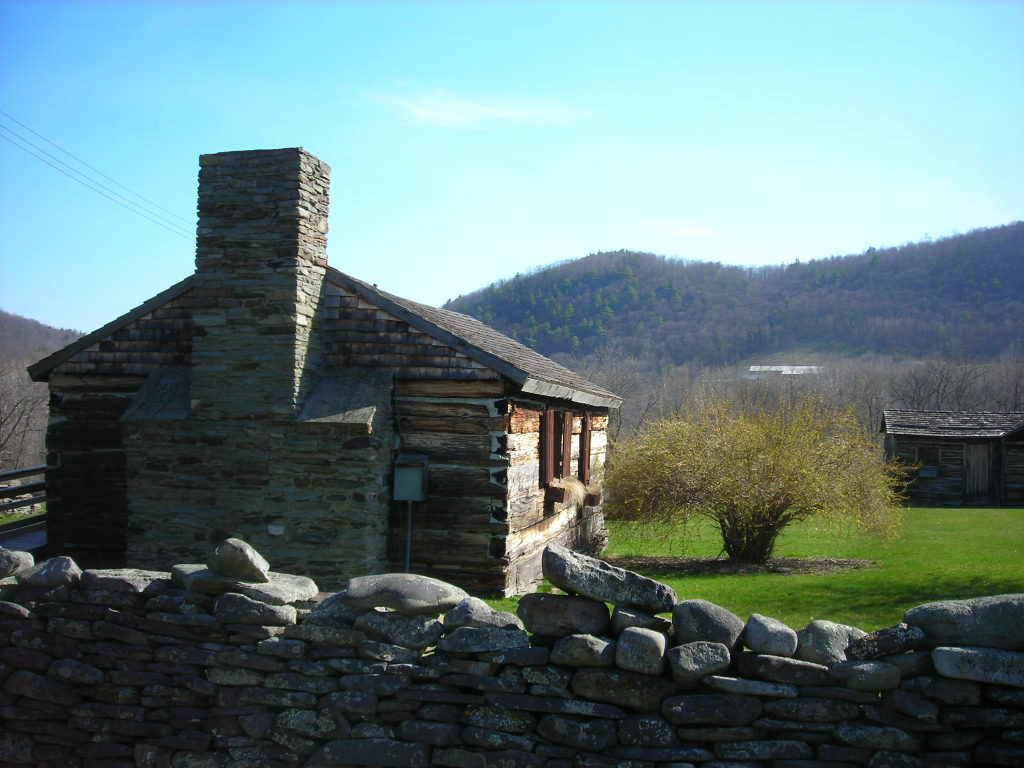

== See also ==
- List of ghost towns in Pennsylvania
