= Towanda, Pennsylvania =

Borough in Pennsylvania, US

- Borough
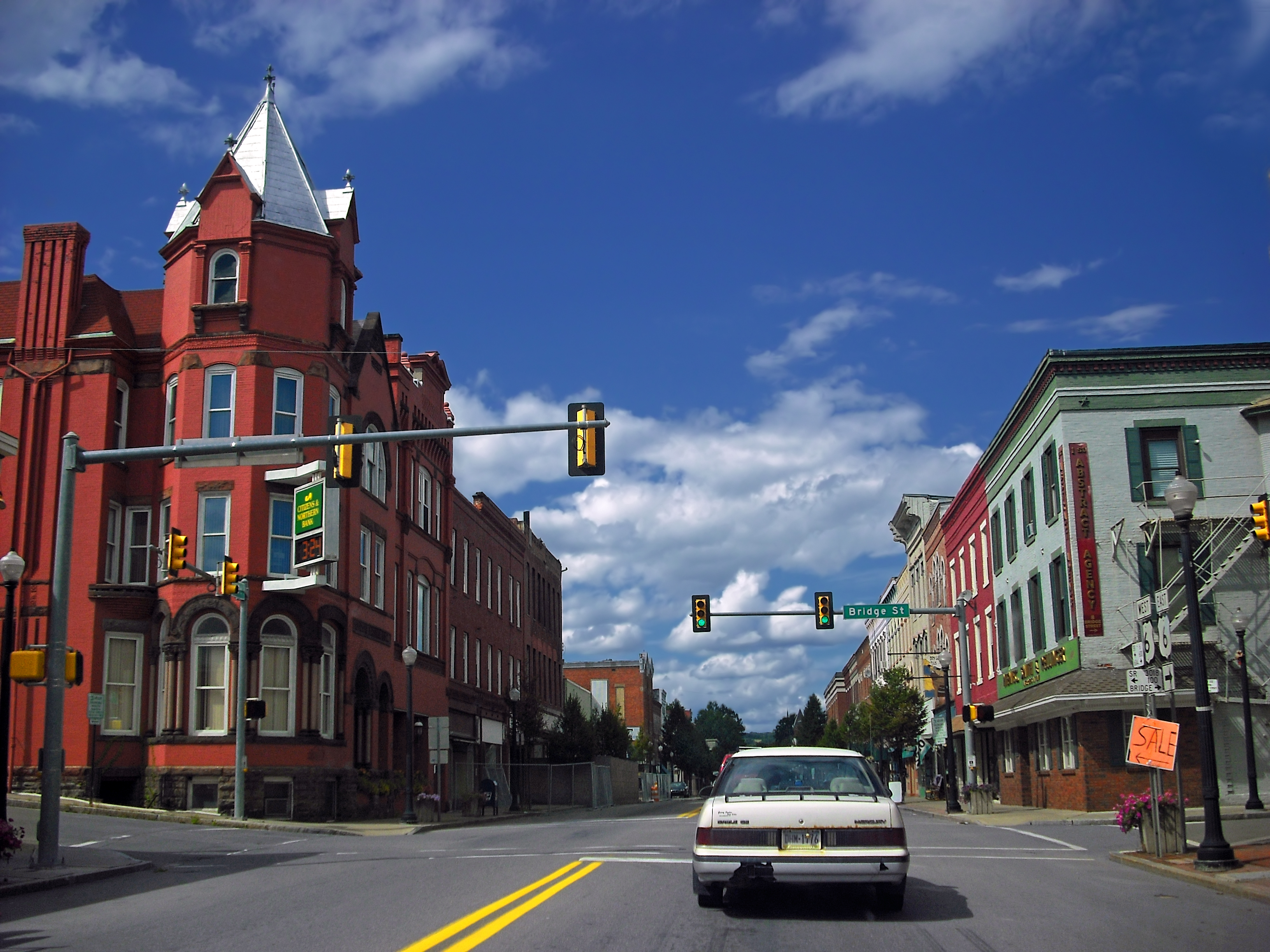
- Main Street

- Logo

- Location of Towanda in Bradford County, Pennsylvania

- Location of Towanda in the state of Pennsylvania
- Coordinates: 41°46′13″N 76°26′48″W
- Country: United States
- State: Pennsylvania
- County: Bradford
- Settled: 1784
- Incorporated: 1828

Government
  - Type: Council–manager
  - Mayor: Garrett Miller

Area
  - Total: 1.17 sq mi (3.03 km^{2})
  - Land: 1.14 sq mi (2.95 km^{2})
  - Water: 0.031 sq mi (0.08 km^{2})
- Elevation: 731 ft (223 m)

Population (2010)
  - Total: 2,919
  - Estimate (2019): 2,810
  - Density: 2,468.6/sq mi (953.14/km^{2})
- Time zone: UTC-5 (Eastern (EST))
  - Summer (DST): UTC-4 (EDT)
- ZIP Code: 18848
- Area code: 570
- FIPS code: 42-77168
- Website: towandaborough.org

Towanda is a borough in, and the county seat of, Bradford County in the U.S. state of Pennsylvania. It is part of Northeastern Pennsylvania and is located 66 miles (106 km) northwest of Wilkes-Barre, on the Susquehanna River. The name means "where we bury the dead" in the Nanticoke language. As of the 2020 census, the population of Towanda was 2,833.

== History ==
Towanda was settled in 1784 and became the county seat in 1812. It was variously known for some years as Meansville, Overton, Williamson, Monmouth, and Towanda, and incorporated in 1828. Towanda was once known primarily for its industrial interests, which included flour, planing and silk mills, a foundry and machine shop, dye works, and manufacturers of talking machines, cut glass, toys and furniture. The population in 1900 was 4,663 and 4,281 in 1910.

The Towanda Historic District and Bradford County Courthouse are listed on the National Register of Historic Places. The Pennsylvania Guide, compiled by the Writers' Program of the Works Progress Administration, described Towanda in 1940 as:

an attractive town of wide brick-paved streets, [occupying] a slope on the west shore of the Susquehanna, at the convergence of three valleys. On the upper and lower reaches of the hill are elaborate residences. A well-developed shopping center serves neighborhood farmers and visitors to surrounding hill and lake resorts. There is a large textile mill in addition to several small industrial plants. The towns' early name, Meansville, for William Means who laid it out in 1812, occasioned 'considerable animosity,' and the present one was adopted in 1828.

— Federal Writers'Project, "Part III: Tours", Pennsylvania: A Guide to the Keystone State (1940)

== Geography ==
Towanda is located near the center of Bradford County at 41°46′13″N 76°26′48″W (41.770251, −76.446545), at approximately 730 ft. above sea level, on the west bank of the Susquehanna River. It is bordered to the north and west by North Towanda Township, to the south and west by Towanda Township, and to the east, across the river, by Wysox Township.

U.S. Route 6 passes through the center of the borough, leading southeast 39 miles (63 km) to Tunkhannock and 60 miles (97 km) to the Scranton area, and west 37 miles (60 km) to Mansfield. U.S. Route 220 bypasses the borough to the west and leads north 18 miles (29 km) to its terminus at Waverly, New York and southwest 67 miles (108 km) to Williamsport.

According to the U.S. Census Bureau, the borough has a total area of 1.2 square miles (3.0 km^{2}), of which 0.03 square miles (0.08 km^{2}), or 2.55%, is water.

=== Climate ===
Towanda has a humid continental climate, with cold winters and warm to hot summers.

Climate data for Towanda 1 S, Pennsylvania (1991–2020 normals, extremes 1894–present)
Month	Jan	Feb	Mar	Apr	May	Jun	Jul	Aug	Sep	Oct	Nov	Dec	Year
Record high °F (°C)	70 (21)	74 (23)	85 (29)	93 (34)	96 (36)	100 (38)	104 (40)	101 (38)	101 (38)	92 (33)	83 (28)	70 (21)	104 (40)
Mean daily maximum °F (°C)	35.0 (1.7)	37.6 (3.1)	46.0 (7.8)	59.5 (15.3)	71.1 (21.7)	79.3 (26.3)	83.7 (28.7)	81.9 (27.7)	74.9 (23.8)	62.6 (17.0)	50.2 (10.1)	39.6 (4.2)	60.1 (15.6)
Daily mean °F (°C)	26.1 (−3.3)	27.7 (−2.4)	35.3 (1.8)	47.1 (8.4)	58.4 (14.7)	67.2 (19.6)	71.5 (21.9)	69.8 (21.0)	62.8 (17.1)	51.2 (10.7)	40.5 (4.7)	31.6 (−0.2)	49.1 (9.5)
Mean daily minimum °F (°C)	17.1 (−8.3)	17.7 (−7.9)	24.6 (−4.1)	34.7 (1.5)	45.7 (7.6)	55.1 (12.8)	59.3 (15.2)	57.7 (14.3)	50.7 (10.4)	39.8 (4.3)	30.7 (−0.7)	23.6 (−4.7)	38.1 (3.4)
Record low °F (°C)	−31 (−35)	−27 (−33)	−19 (−28)	6 (−14)	22 (−6)	32 (0)	38 (3)	33 (1)	25 (−4)	16 (−9)	−7 (−22)	−20 (−29)	−31 (−35)
Average precipitation inches (mm)	2.39 (61)	1.90 (48)	3.12 (79)	3.47 (88)	3.36 (85)	3.69 (94)	4.02 (102)	3.86 (98)	3.83 (97)	3.67 (93)	2.60 (66)	2.71 (69)	38.62 (981)
Average snowfall inches (cm)	11.0 (28)	7.1 (18)	8.8 (22)	1.5 (3.8)	0.0 (0.0)	0.0 (0.0)	0.0 (0.0)	0.0 (0.0)	0.0 (0.0)	0.2 (0.51)	1.8 (4.6)	7.4 (19)	37.8 (96)
Average precipitation days (≥ 0.01 in)	12.5	9.8	11.7	12.7	12.8	12.2	11.7	10.7	10.0	11.5	10.8	11.8	138.2
Average snowy days (≥ 0.1 in)	7.1	6.1	4.5	0.9	0.0	0.0	0.0	0.0	0.0	0.1	1.7	5.2	25.6
Source: NOAA

== Demographics ==
Historical population
Census	Pop.	Note	%±
1830	224		—
1840	912		307.1%
1850	1,171		28.4%
1860	1,622		38.5%
1870	2,696		66.2%
1880	3,814		41.5%
1890	4,169		9.3%
1900	4,663		11.8%
1910	4,281		−8.2%
1920	4,269		−0.3%
1930	4,104		−3.9%
1940	4,154		1.2%
1950	4,069		−2.0%
1960	4,293		5.5%
1970	4,224		−1.6%
1980	3,526		−16.5%
1990	3,242		−8.1%
2000	3,024		−6.7%
2010	2,919		−3.5%
2020	2,798		−4.1%

As of the 2000 census, there were 3,024 people, 1,279 households and 795 families residing in the borough. The population density was 2,674.2 inhabitants per square mile (1,032.5/km^{2}). There were 1,459 housing units at an average density of 1,290.2 per square mile (498.1/km^{2}). The racial makeup of the borough was 96.36% White, 0.86% African American, 0.36% Native American, 1.19% Asian, 0.13% from other races, and 1.09% from two or more races. Hispanic or Latino of any race were 1.19% of the population.

There were 1,279 households, of which 30.5% had children under the age of 18 living with them, 43.6% were married couples living together, 13.4% had a female householder with no husband present, and 37.8% were non-families. 31.7% of all households were made up of individuals, and 12.7% had someone living alone who was 65 years of age or older. The average household size was 2.32 and the average family size was 2.92.

Age distribution was 25.1% under the age of 18, 7.7% from 18 to 24, 28.3% from 25 to 44, 22.4% from 45 to 64, and 16.6% who were 65 years of age or older. The median age was 38 years. For every 100 females, there were 92.0 males. For every 100 females age 18 and over, there were 85.9 males. The median household income was $35,814, and the median family income was $41,884. Males had a median income of $35,663 versus $23,796 for females. The per capita income for the borough was $17,438. About 9.9% of families and 13.4% of the population were below the poverty line, including 19.5% of those under age 18 and 4.0% of those age 65 or over.

== Education ==
Towanda is home to Lackawanna College Towanda Center, a private, accredited two-year college serving Northeastern Pennsylvania and its satellite campus of Lackawanna College in Scranton.

== Government ==
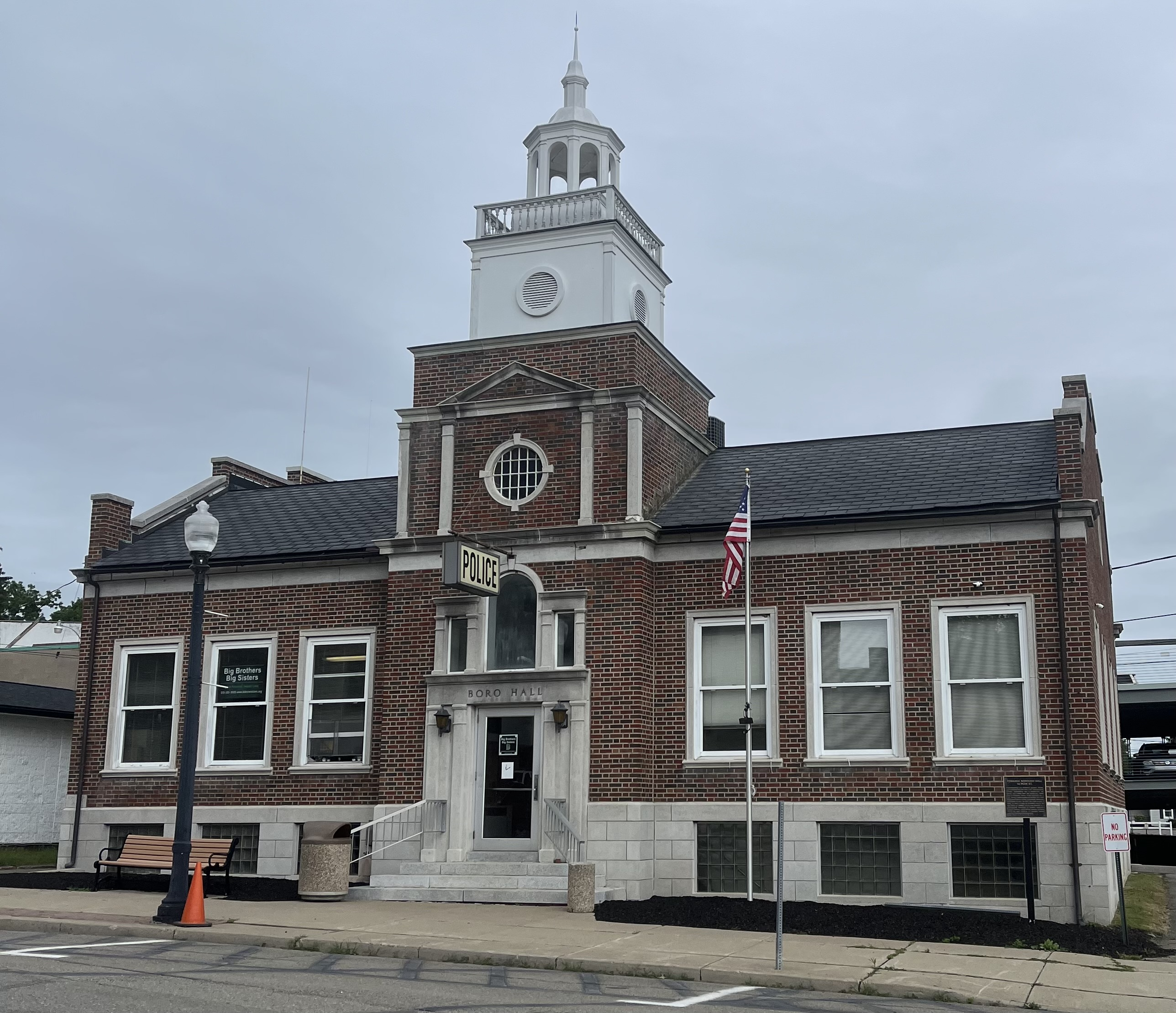
Towanda Borough Hall

Towanda has a council–manager form of government.

== Notable people ==
- Jean Brenchley, microbiologist
- Nate Bump, relief pitcher for the Florida Marlins
- Mike Conley, boxer
- Edward T. Fairchild, Chief Justice of the Wisconsin Supreme Court
- Wilson D. Gillette, U.S. Congressman from Pennsylvania
- William W. Kingsbury, U.S. Delegate from Minnesota Territory
- Gregory La Cava, film director (My Man Godfrey, Stage Door)
- Helen Tracy Lowe-Porter, translator, maternal great-grandmother of British prime minister Boris Johnson
- Roger A. Madigan, Pennsylvania state legislator
- Tina Pickett, Pennsylvania state legislator
- Charlotte Porter, co-founder and co-editor of Poet Lore
- Julia H. Scott (1809–1842), poet
- Sabra Wilbur Vought (1877–1942), librarian
- Charles M. Webb, Wisconsin jurist and politician
- David Wilmot, U.S. Senator and Congressman from Pennsylvania
