= Pennsylvania Route 514 =

State highway in Bradford County, Pennsylvania, US

Pennsylvania Route 514

Route information
- Maintained by PennDOT
- Length: 10.635 mi (17.115 km)
- Existed: 1928–present

Major junctions
- West end: PA 14 in Troy Township
- East end: PA 414 in Franklin Township

Location
- Country: United States
- State: Pennsylvania
- Counties: Bradford

Highway system
- Pennsylvania State Route System; Interstate; US; State; Scenic; Legislative
← PA 513	→ PA 515

Pennsylvania Route 514 (PA 514) is a 10.66-mile-long (17.16 km) state highway located in Bradford County in Pennsylvania. The western terminus is at PA 14 in Troy Township near the borough of Troy. The eastern terminus is at PA 414 in Franklin Township. PA 514 is a two-lane undivided road that runs through rural areas in southwestern Bradford County. The route was designated in 1928 to run between PA 14 in Troy east to Granville Center along an unpaved road; the route was paved two years later. PA 514 was extended east to PA 414 in 1934.

== Route description ==
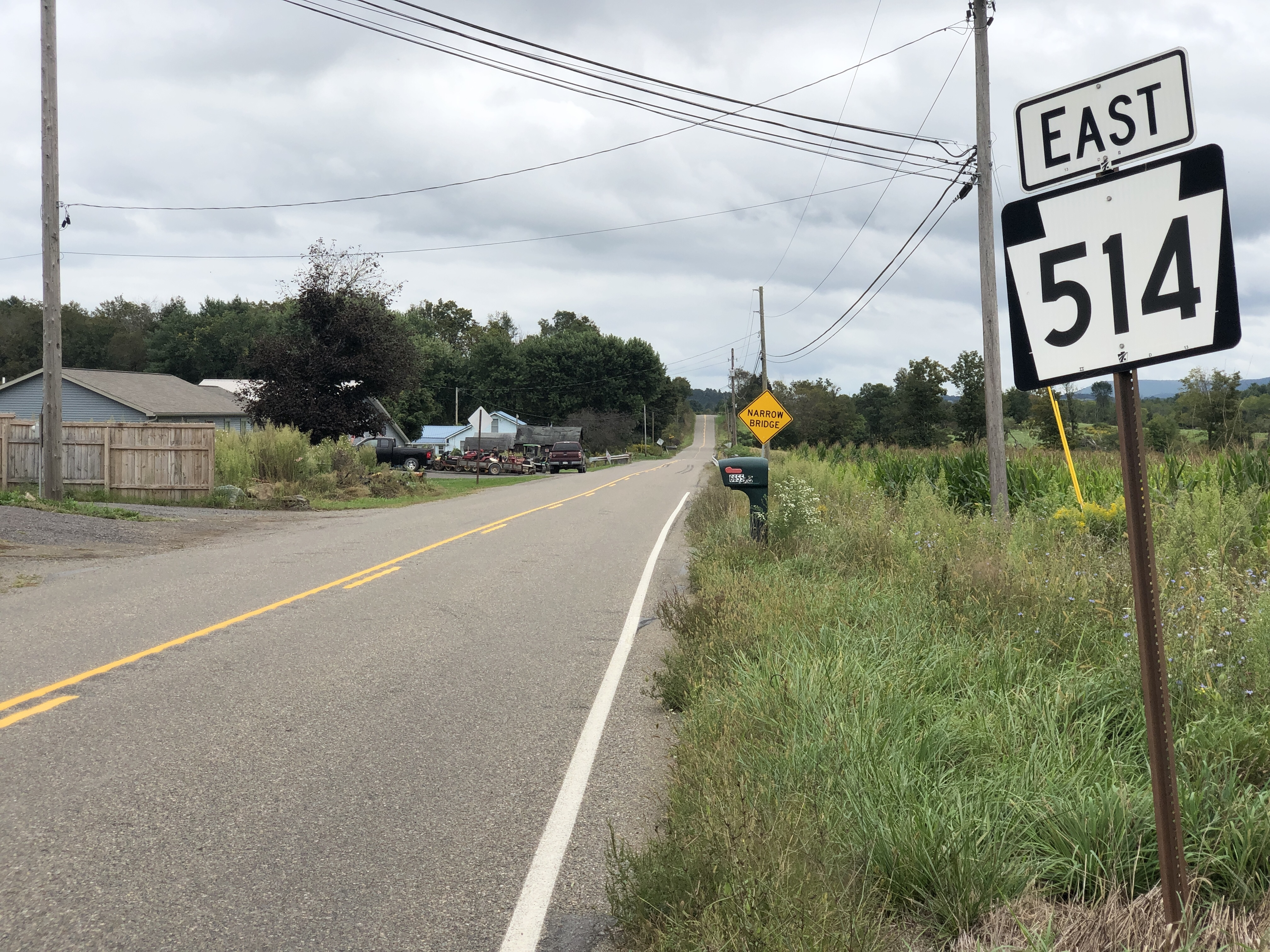
PA 514 eastbound at Bailey Corners Road in Granville Township.

PA 514 begins at the intersection with PA 14 south of the borough of Troy in Troy Township. The route progresses to the southeast, quickly intersecting with Tennessee Gas Road, where the roadway begins its rural settings. Passing farmland after farmland, PA 514 passes several farms and through trees and enters the community of Granville Summit, where it intersects with Martin Road. In downtown Granville Summit, at the intersection with Cowley Road, the road makes a gradual curve but maintains its southeastern progression. After the curve, PA 514 gains the name Granville Road but remains rural as it continues. The highway makes a curve to the northeast after Spencer Hill Road intersects, where it enters Granville Township.

PA 514 then enters Granville Center, a small hamlet, which stretches until the intersection with Baileys Corners Road (State Route 3019 or SR 3019). After Baileys Corners Road, PA 514 continues eastward until turning to the southeast once again, maintaining its rural surroundings. After the intersection with Sayles Road, the highway makes a gradual curve to the south, intersecting Allen Meadow Road (SR 3017). A short distance later, PA 514 enters the hamlet of West Franklin and intersects with PA 414, where the designation terminates.

== History ==
PA 514 was first designated as a state highway in the mass numbering of state highways around Pennsylvania during 1928 from PA 14, its parent, in Troy to Granville Center. That portion of PA 514 was unpaved for two years until the Pennsylvania Department of Highways upgraded it in 1930. The rest of the alignment, from Granville Center to PA 414 in West Franklin, was still under construction until 1934, when the route was opened to traffic. The route has remained on its current alignment since 1934.

== Major intersections ==
The entire route is in Bradford County.

Location	mi	km	Destinations	Notes
Troy Township	0.000	0.000	PA 14 – Canton, Troy	Western terminus of PA 514
Franklin Township	10.635	17.115	PA 414 – Monroeton, Canton	Eastern terminus of PA 514; village of West Franklin
1.000 mi = 1.609 km; 1.000 km = 0.621 mi
