= Pennsylvania Route 414 =

State highway in Pennsylvania, United States

Pennsylvania Route 414

Route information
- Maintained by PennDOT
- Length: 79.4 mi (127.8 km)

Major junctions
- West end: PA 44 near Waterville
- PA 287 in Morris Township; I-99 / US 15 in Liberty; PA 14 in Canton; PA 154 in Canton; PA 514 in West Franklin
- East end: US 220 in Monroe

Location
- Country: United States
- State: Pennsylvania
- Counties: Lycoming, Tioga, Bradford

Highway system
- Pennsylvania State Route System; Interstate; US; State; Scenic; Legislative
← PA 413	→ PA 415
← PA 892	→ PA 894
← PA 940	→ PA 942

Pennsylvania Route 414 (PA 414) is a 79.4-mile-long (127.8 km) state highway located in Lycoming, Tioga, and Bradford counties in Pennsylvania. The western terminus is at PA 44 in Waterville. The eastern terminus is at US 220 in Monroe. The first leg of the highway, between its intersection with PA 44 in Waterville and Blackwell (crossing Pine Creek and Pine Creek Rail Trail the final time) is very narrow and rugged.

== Route description ==
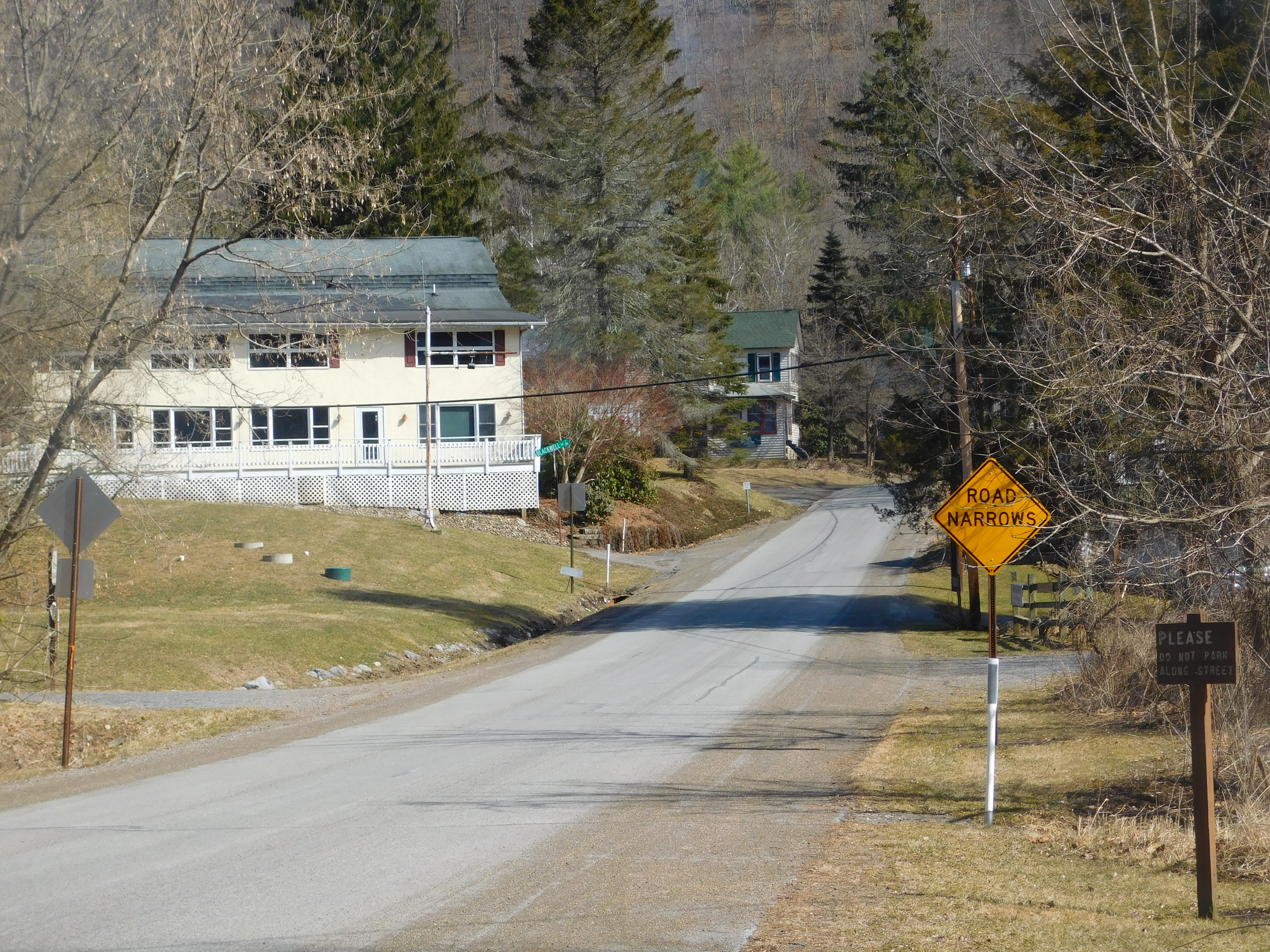
PA 414 in Blackwell

PA 414 begins at an intersection with PA 44 in Cummings Township, Lycoming County, heading north-northwest on a two-lane undivided road. The route heads through dense forests and mountains of the Tiadaghton State Forest along the west bank of Pine Creek within Pine Creek Gorge, crossing into McHenry Township. The road crosses to the east bank of the creek and the Pine Creek Rail Trail, turning northwest and passing through Jersey Mills and Blue Stone. PA 414 heads through the residential community of Cammal and continues through more forests alongside the rail trail, passing through Ross. The road curves to the north and enters Brown Township, turning to the northeast and leaving the Tiadaghton State Forest as it passes through more dense forests. The route curves north and passes through Slate Run before heading through Hilborn and crossing the Pine Creek Rail Trail and Pine Creek again, this time on the historic Bridge in Brown Township. PA 414 turns northeast and runs along the northwest bank of the creek through more dense forests on the eastern edge of the Tioga State Forest. The road continues to wind northeast through forested areas along the creek, with the rail trail crossing the creek to run next to the road.

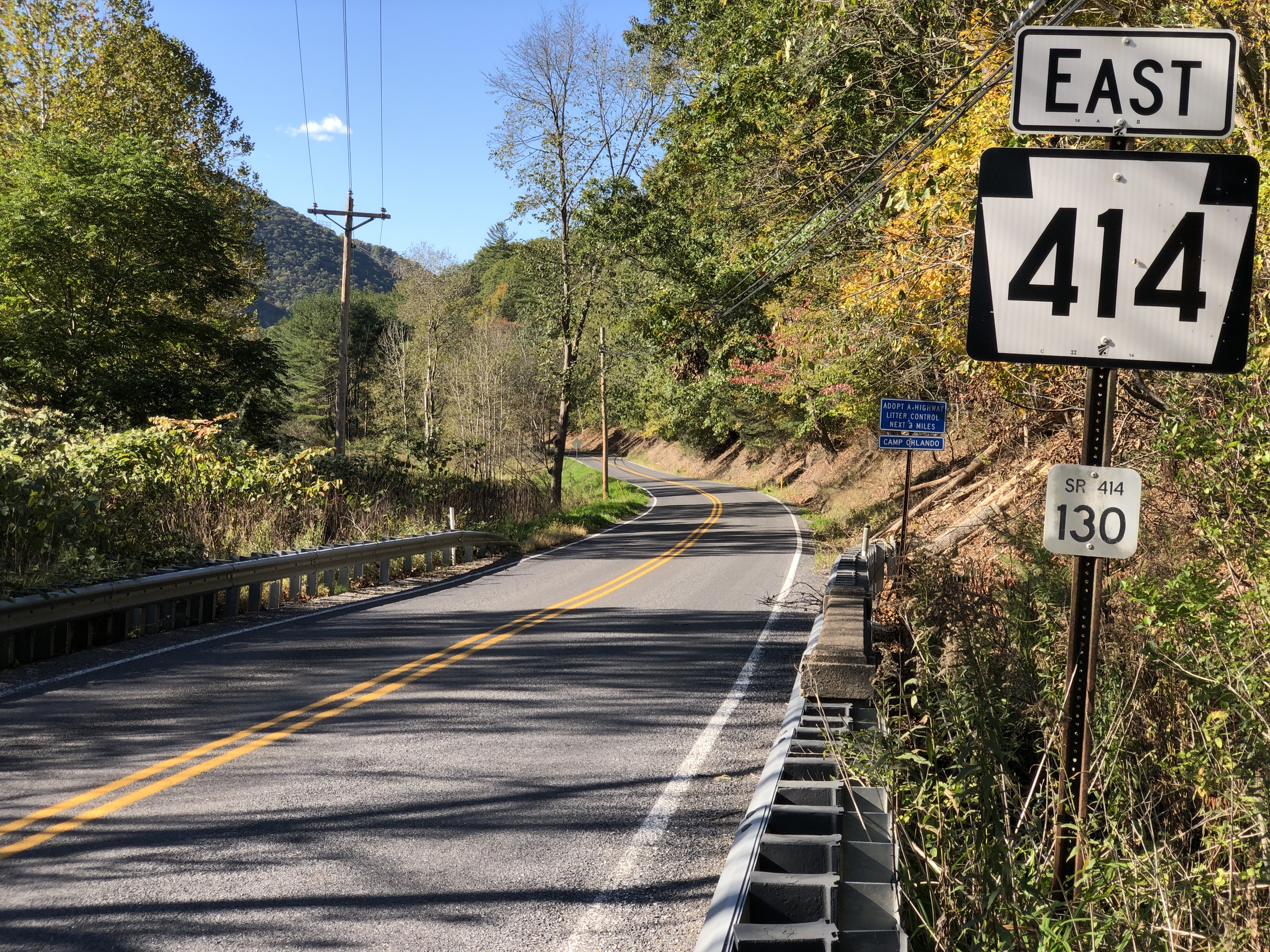
PA 414 eastbound in McHenry Township

PA 414 enters Morris Township in Tioga County and continues northeast through more forests, crossing the Pine Creek and Pine Creek Rail Trail for the final time and passing through Blackwell. The road winds northeast through forested areas to the south of Babb Creek, running through Doane. Farther northeast, the route heads away from the Tioga State Forest and comes to an intersection with PA 287 in Hoytville. At this point, PA 414 forms a concurrency with PA 287, heading through wooded areas of homes. In Morris, PA 287 splits to the northwest and PA 414 continues east into more dense forests. The road continues through wooded areas with some fields and sparse residences, crossing into Liberty Township. The route runs through a mix of farmland and woodland with homes, heading to the east-southeast, passing through the unmarked hamlet of Hartfield. PA 414 then heads southeast and comes to an interchange with I-99/US 15 before continuing into the borough of Liberty, where it becomes High Street and heads east into residential areas. The route turns north onto Water Street and passes through rural areas with a few homes. PA 414 turns to the northeast on an unnamed road and crosses back into Liberty Township, continuing into open agricultural areas with some woods and residences. The road curves east before turning northeast again, heading through more rural areas. Farther northeast, the route passes through Eastpoint and enters Union Township. PA 414 runs through farmland and woodland with some homes, making a couple curves before coming to the community of Ogdensburg. The route heads east through open farmland with some woods and residences, passing through Union Center prior to turning to the north. PA 414 heads through more rural areas, turning east at Gleason. The road continues through a mix of farm fields and woods with a few homes.

PA 414 heads into Canton Township in Bradford County and passes through more wooded areas as Cedar Ledge Road before reaching an intersection with PA 14 in Cedar Ledge. Here, the route turns north to join PA 14 on an unnamed road, heading through rural areas of homes. The road crosses into the borough of Canton and becomes Springbrook Drive, heading east near a few businesses. The two routes continue north onto Sullivan Street and pass a few homes before heading into the commercial downtown of Canton. Here, PA 14 continues north onto Troy Street and PA 414 heads east onto West Main Street, passing more downtown businesses and intersecting the northern terminus of PA 154. Past this intersection, the road becomes East Main Street and heads east-northeast through residential areas. The route crosses back into Canton Township and heads into a mix of farmland and woodland with some homes, curving to the east. PA 414 heads into open agricultural areas with some homes, passing through East Canton and crossing into Leroy Township. The road turns to the east-northeast and passes through West Leroy, continuing through more open farmland with some woods and residences to the north of Towanda Creek and passing through Leroy and Woodruff Corners. The route continues through rural areas and enters Franklin Township, turning northeast and intersecting the eastern terminus of PA 514 in West Franklin. PA 414 winds east through more farmland and woodland with some residences to the north of the creek, passing through Franklindale. The road continues into Monroe Township and heads northeast through more farmland before continuing east into wooded areas with some fields and gomes. The route heads into the borough of Monroe and turns northeast as Pennsylvania Avenue, passing between woods to the west and residential areas to the east before passing more homes and running to the west of a Reading Blue Mountain and Northern Railroad line. PA 414 comes to its eastern terminus at an intersection with US 220.

== Major intersections ==
County	Location	mi	km	Destinations	Notes
Lycoming	Cummings Township	0.0	0.0	PA 44 – Waterville, Haneyville	Western terminus; village of Waterville
Tioga	Morris Township	30.0	48.3	PA 287 south – Salladasburg	West end of PA 287 overlap
Tioga	Morris Township	30.7	49.4	PA 287 north – Wellsboro	East end of PA 287 overlap
Tioga	Liberty	40.4	65.0	I-99 / US 15 – Mansfield, Williamsport	Exit 162 on I-99
Bradford	Canton Township	56.0	90.1	PA 14 south – Williamsport	West end of PA 14 overlap
Bradford	Canton	57.5	92.5	PA 14 north (Troy Street) – Troy, Elmira	East end of PA 14 overlap
Bradford	Canton	57.6	92.7	PA 154 south (Minnequa Avenue) – Forksville	Northern terminus of PA 154
Bradford	Leroy Township	70.0	112.7	PA 514 west (Granville Road)	Eastern terminus of PA 514
Bradford	Monroe	79.3	127.6	US 220 (Shaw Boulevard) – Towanda, Dushore	Eastern terminus
1.000 mi = 1.609 km; 1.000 km = 0.621 mi: Concurrency terminus

== PA 414 Truck ==
Pennsylvania Route 414 Truck
- Location: Liberty
- Length: 3.8 mi (6.1 km)
- Existed: 2023–present

Pennsylvania Route 414 Truck is a truck route bypassing a weight-restricted segment on PA 414 on which vehicles over 10 tons are prohibited. The route follows US 15/I-99 and Bloss Mountain Road around the borough of Liberty, Pennsylvania. Signs were erected in 2023.
