= Alba, Pennsylvania =

Borough in Pennsylvania, US

- Borough
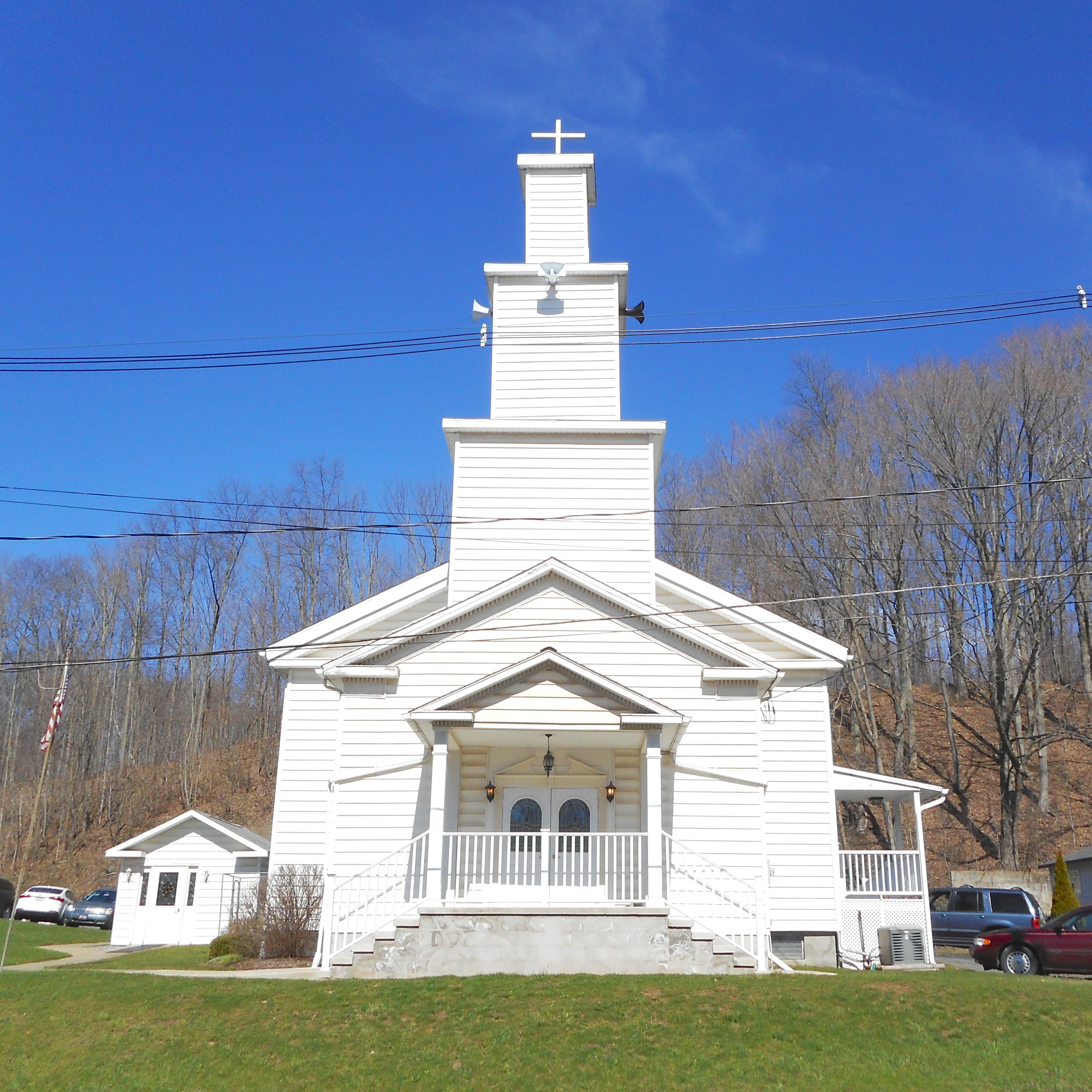
- First Christian Church

- Location of Alba in Bradford County, Pennsylvania.

- Location of Alba in the state of Pennsylvania
- Coordinates: 41°42′16″N 76°49′39″W
- Country: United States
- State: Pennsylvania
- County: Bradford
- Settled: 1803
- Incorporated: 1864

Government
  - Mayor: Dale Palmer
  - President: Carol Bastion
  - Vice President: Lorelei Cotton
  - Secretary Treasurer: Tricia Jackson

Area
  - Total: 0.68 sq mi (1.75 km^{2})
  - Land: 0.68 sq mi (1.75 km^{2})
  - Water: 0 sq mi (0.00 km^{2})
- Elevation: 1,572 ft (479 m)

Population (2020)
  - Total: 133
  - Density: 197.3/sq mi (76.18/km^{2})
- Time zone: UTC-5 (Eastern (EST))
  - Summer (DST): UTC-4 (EDT)
- ZIP code: 16910
- Area code: 570
- FIPS code: 42-00572
- GNIS feature ID: 1168112
- Website: www.albaborough.com

Alba is a borough in Bradford County, Pennsylvania, United States. It is part of Northeastern Pennsylvania. The population was 135 at the 2020 census.

== Geography ==
Alba is located in southwestern Bradford County at 41°42′16″N 76°49′39″W (41.704343, -76.827519). It is bordered by Canton Township on the west, south, and east, and by Troy Township on the north.

Pennsylvania Route 14 passes through the borough, leading north 6 miles (10 km) to Troy and U.S. Route 6, and south 4 miles (6 km) to Canton.

According to the United States Census Bureau, the borough has a total area of 0.66 square miles (1.7 km^{2}), all land.

== Demographics ==
Historical population
Census	Pop.	Note	%±
1870	222		—
1880	189		−14.9%
1890	163		−13.8%
1900	154		−5.5%
1910	150		−2.6%
1920	146		−2.7%
1930	121		−17.1%
1940	154		27.3%
1950	190		23.4%
1960	192		1.1%
1970	184		−4.2%
1980	222		20.7%
1990	170		−23.4%
2000	186		9.4%
2010	157		−15.6%
2020	133		−15.3%
2021 (est.)	135	▲	1.5%

As of the census of 2000, there were 186 people, 70 households, and 49 families residing in the borough. The population density was 274.1 inhabitants per square mile (105.8/km^{2}). There were 75 housing units at an average density of 110.5 per square mile (42.7/km^{2}). The racial makeup of the borough was 94.09% White, 3.76% African American, 2.15% from other races. Hispanic or Latino of any race were 2.15% of the population.

There were 70 households, out of which 32.9% had children under the age of 18 living with them, 61.4% were married couples living together, 5.7% had a female householder with no husband present, and 30.0% were non-families. 21.4% of all households were made up of individuals, and 10.0% had someone living alone who was 65 years of age or older. The average household size was 2.66 and the average family size was 3.24.

In the borough the population was spread out, with 29.6% under the age of 18, 5.4% from 18 to 24, 25.8% from 25 to 44, 25.8% from 45 to 64, and 13.4% who were 65 years of age or older. The median age was 36 years. For every 100 females there were 97.9 males. For every 100 females age 18 and over, there were 84.5 males.

The median income for a household in the borough was $26,250, and the median income for a family was $34,375. Males had a median income of $26,500 versus $18,750 for females. The per capita income for the borough was $11,453. About 6.1% of families and 8.6% of the population were below the poverty line, including none of those under the age of eighteen or sixty five or over.
