= Clyde Robbins =

United States Coast Guard vice admiral (1931–2026)

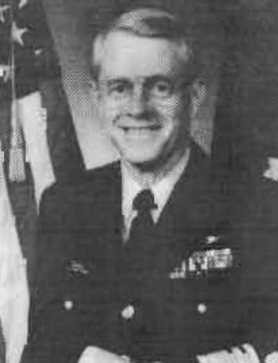
- Born: 24 April 1931; Columbia Cross Roads, Pennsylvania, U.S.
- Died: 16 August 2026 (aged 95); Troy, Pennsylvania, U.S.
- Military career
- Allegiance: United States of America
- Branch: United States Coast Guard
- Service years: 1955–1990s
- Rank: Vice admiral

Clyde E. Robbins (24 April 1931 – 16 August 2026) was a United States Coast Guard vice admiral. He served as Director of Intelligence and Security for the U.S. Secretary of Transportation as well as the Federal On Scene Coordinator for the Exxon Valdez oil spill cleanup. Robbins died at his home in Troy, Pennsylvania, on 16 August 2026, at the age of 95.
