= Pennsylvania Route 14 =

State highway in Pennsylvania, US

Pennsylvania Route 14

Route information
- Maintained by PennDOT
- Length: 53.09 mi (85.44 km)
- Existed: 1927–present

Major junctions
- South end: I-99 / US 15 in Trout Run
- PA 414 in Canton; US 6 in Troy
- North end: NY 14 at the New York state line near Southport, NY

Location
- Country: United States
- State: Pennsylvania
- Counties: Lycoming, Tioga, Bradford

Highway system
- Pennsylvania State Route System; Interstate; US; State; Scenic; Legislative
← PA 13	→ US 15

Pennsylvania Route 14 (PA 14) is a Pennsylvania highway that runs for 52 miles (84 km). It runs from US 15 (future Interstate 99 (I-99)) in Trout Run, Pennsylvania to the New York-Pennsylvania border at Fassett, Pennsylvania, co-signed with US 6 for a short distance in Troy. The highway continues in New York as New York State Route 14 (NY 14).

It once extended south all the way to the Maryland border, following Lycoming Creek Road, High Street, Hepburn Street, Market Street and East Third Street through the Williamsport area. It roughly followed the Susquehanna Trail to Northumberland, US 11 to Shamokin Dam, US 15 to York Springs, and PA 94 to Maryland.

== Route description ==
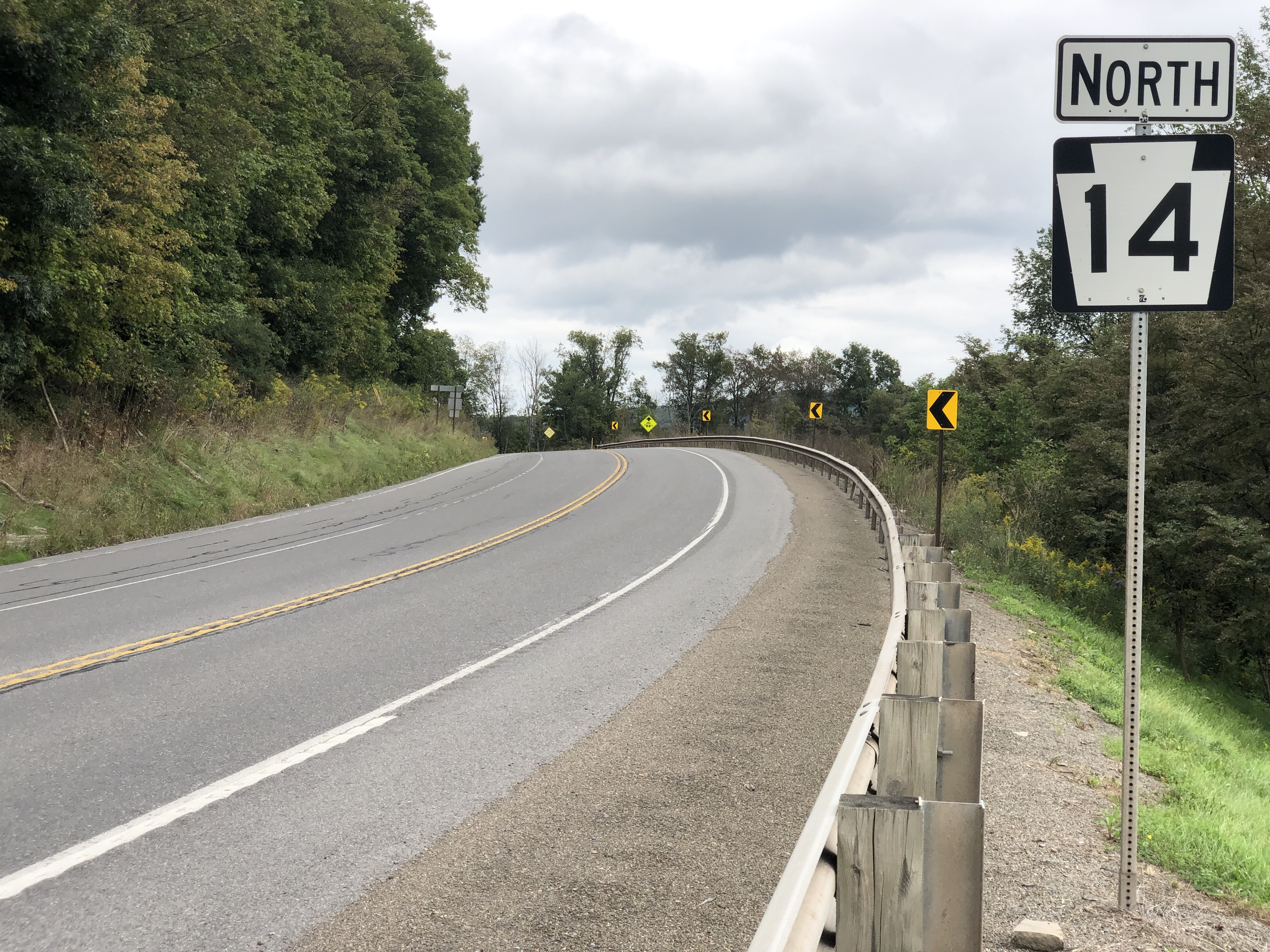
PA 14 northbound at PA 514 in Troy Township.

PA 14 begins at I-99/US 15 in Trout Run in Lycoming County and heads northeast, paralleling Lycoming Creek. It then turns more northerly at Bodines before crossing into Tioga County. It runs through Roaring Branch before entering Bradford County.

In Bradford County, PA 14 provides access to Grover, then forms a short concurrency with PA 414, splitting up in Canton. North of Canton, PA 14 passes through Alba before serving as the west terminus of PA 514 south of Troy. At Troy, PA 14 joins with US 6. PA 14 then splits off to the north to Columbia Cross Roads. PA 14 then runs through Snedekerville, Gillett, and Fassett before crossing the New York state line and becoming NY 14.

== History ==
PA 14 was formed in 1927, stretching from the Maryland state line to the New York state line. When formed, it was concurrent with several U.S. Highways in the Williamsport area, including US 111, US 120, and US 220. From Harrisburg to York, it followed US 15 and what is today PA 94 via the Susquehanna Trail. In 1930, the route was realigned onto what is now PA 405 from Lewisburg to Muncy.

By 1940, US 111 was redesignated as US 15. As in previous years, PA 14 remained concurrent with the roadway now carrying US 15 to Northumberland. From Northumberland south to Duncannon, PA 14 was realigned onto the western bank of the Susquehanna River, creating an overlap with US 11. At Duncannon, US 11 split from PA 14 and crossed the Susquehanna while PA 14 continued south along the riverbank to Lemoyne, a suburb of Harrisburg. Here, PA 14 joined US 11 on a brief overlap east across the Susquehanna into Harrisburg. At Front Street, US 11 turned north while PA 14 continued east on Market Street. PA 14 then turned right onto 4th Street, following Mulberry and Derry Streets out of Harrisburg to Paxtang, where PA 14 terminated at US 322 and US 422. In 1941, PA 14 was rerouted to the east side of the Susquehanna River from Muncy to Clarks Ferry on what is now Interstate 180 and PA 147; the US 15 designation was moved west to run concurrent with US 11. From Clarks Ferry to Harrisburg, PA 14 was concurrent with US 22 and US 322. By 1960, PA 14 was truncated to end at US 22 and US 322 in Clarks Ferry. Eliminating the concurrency with US 22 and US 322 along Front Street. This would also remove the PA 14 designation on 4th Street, Mulberry Street and Derry Street from Harrisburg to Paxtang.

In 1963, the Susquehanna Riverbank extension of PA 14 became PA 147. PA 14 was truncated to terminate at US 15 in Trout Run.

== Major intersections ==
County	Location	mi	km	Destinations	Notes
Lycoming	Lewis Township	0.00	0.00	I-99 / US 15 – Williamsport, Mansfield	Southern terminus; exit 148 on I-99
Tioga	No major junctions				
Bradford	Canton Township	23.87	38.42	PA 414 west – Ogdensburg	South end of PA 414 overlap
Bradford	Canton	25.39	40.86	PA 414 east (Main Street)	North end of PA 414 overlap
Bradford	Troy Township	33.14	53.33	PA 514 east – Granville Center	Western terminus of PA 514
Bradford	Troy	36.05	58.02	US 6 west (Main Street) – Mansfield	South end of US 6 overlap
Bradford	Troy Township	36.85	59.30	US 6 east (Roosevelt Highway) – Towanda	North end of US 6 overlap
Bradford	South Creek Township	53.09	85.44	NY 14 north – Elmira	Continuation into New York
1.000 mi = 1.609 km; 1.000 km = 0.621 mi: Concurrency terminus
