= Grover, Pennsylvania =

Unincorporated community in Pennsylvania, US

- Unincorporated community
- Location within Pennsylvania
- Coordinates: 41°36′52″N 76°52′02″W
- Country: United States
- State: Pennsylvania
- County: Bradford
- Elevation: 1,224 ft (373 m)
- Time zone: UTC-5 (Eastern (EST))
  - Summer (DST): UTC-4 (EDT)
- ZIP code: 17735
- Area codes: 272 & 570
- GNIS feature ID: 1176284

Grover is an unincorporated community in Bradford County, Pennsylvania, United States. The community is located along Pennsylvania Route 14, 3 miles (4.8 km) south-southwest of Canton.

== ZIP code information ==
Grover has a post office with ZIP code 17735. In 2013 the post office was converted to a remotely managed status under the direction of the Canton Post Office.

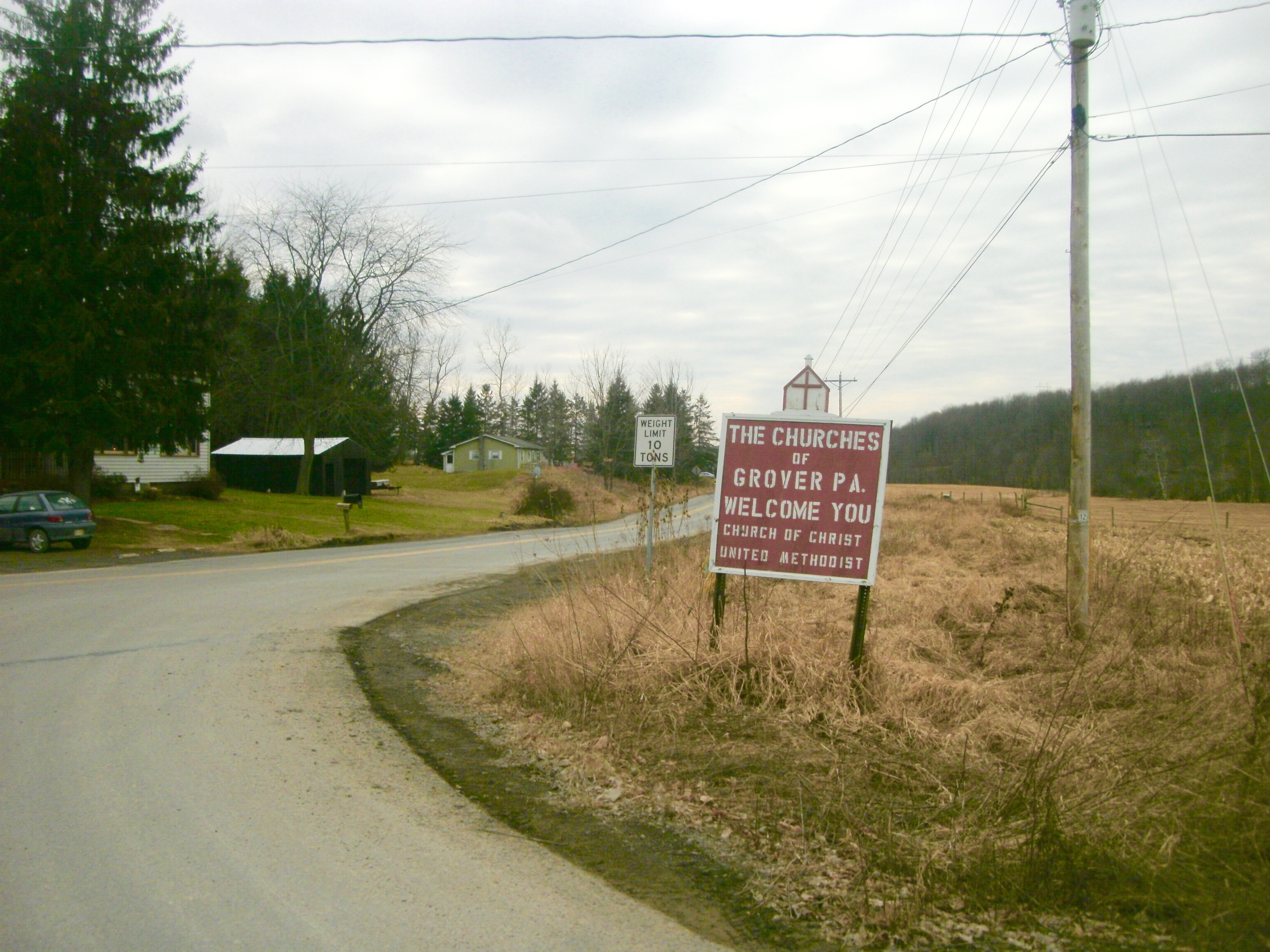
Sign for the churches of Grover, Pennsylvania as seen at a turn from State Route 154 in February 2012
