= Granville Township, Pennsylvania =

Granville Township, Pennsylvania is the name of two places in the U.S.:

- Granville Township, Bradford County, Pennsylvania
- Granville Township, Mifflin County, Pennsylvania
