= Armenia Township, Pennsylvania =

Township in Pennsylvania, US

Coordinates: 41°46′00″N 76°51′59″W

- Township
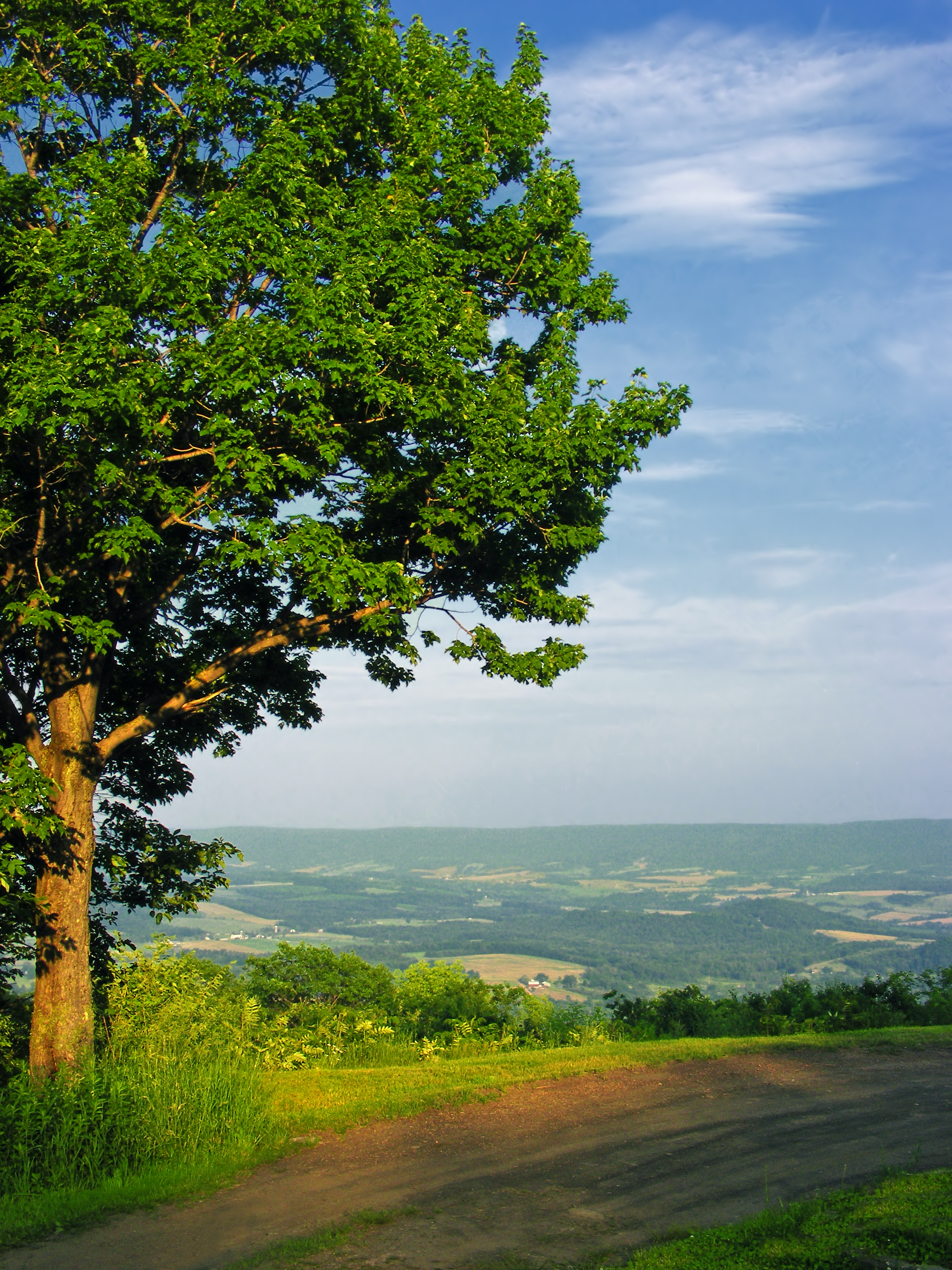
- A view of the township from Tioga State Forest

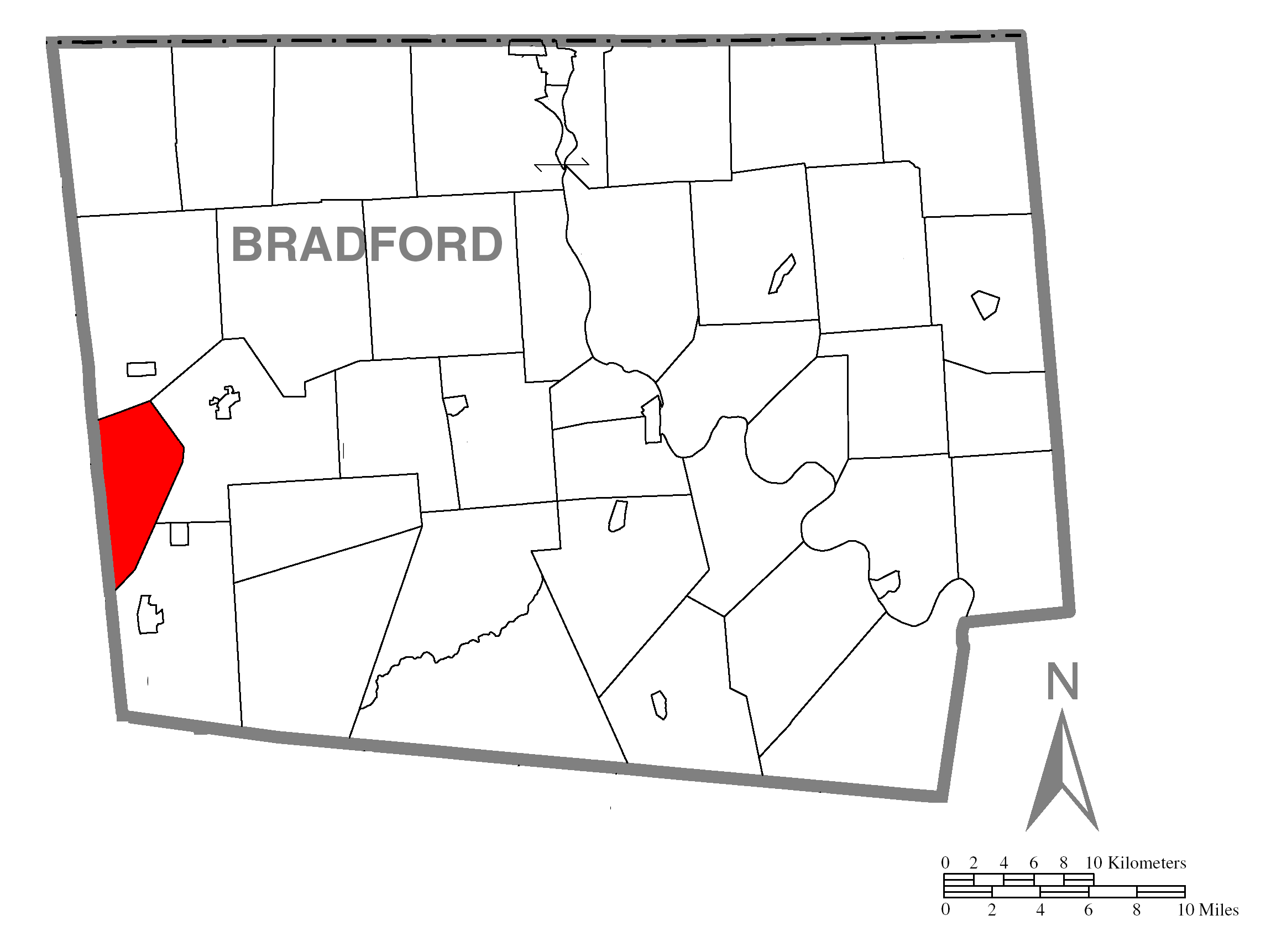
- Map of Bradford County with Armenia Township highlighted

- Map of Bradford County, Pennsylvania
- Country: United States
- State: Pennsylvania
- County: Bradford
- Settled: 1808
- Incorporated: 1843

Area
  - Total: 18.41 sq mi (47.68 km^{2})
  - Land: 18.29 sq mi (47.37 km^{2})
  - Water: 0.12 sq mi (0.32 km^{2})

Population (2020)
  - Total: 206 ▲
  - Estimate (2023): 203
  - Density: 9.7/sq mi (3.74/km^{2})
- FIPS code: 42-015-03056
- 1970 Donald and Charles Bristol drowned to death in Tamarack swamp

Armenia Township is a township in Bradford County, Pennsylvania, United States. It is part of Northeastern Pennsylvania. The population was 206 at the 2020 census.

== Geography ==
Armenia Township is located in western Bradford County, atop the eastern end of Armenia Mountain, a 2,200-to-2,400-foot-high (670 to 730 m) plateau that rises 1,000 feet (300 m) above the surrounding countryside. Tioga State Forest occupies much of the southern part of the township.

Armenia Township is bordered by Columbia Township to the north, Troy Township to the east, and Canton Township to the southeast. To the west, in Tioga County, are Ward Township and Sullivan Township.

According to the U.S. Census Bureau, Armenia Township has a total area of 18.4 square miles (47.7 km^{2}), of which 18.3 square miles (47.4 km^{2}) is land and 0.12 square miles (0.3 km^{2}), or 0.67%, is water.

== Demographics ==
Historical population
Census	Pop.	Note	%±
2010	180		—
2020	206		14.4%
2023 (est.)	203		−1.5%
U.S. Decennial Census

As of the census of 2000, there were 166 people, 65 households, and 44 families residing in the township. The population density was 9.2 people per square mile (3.5/km^{2}). There were 155 housing units at an average density of 8.6/sq mi (3.3/km^{2}). The racial makeup of the township was 100.00% White.

There were 65 households, out of which 26.2% had children under the age of 18 living with them, 63.1% were married couples living together, 4.6% had a female householder with no husband present, and 30.8% were non-families. 26.2% of all households were made up of individuals, and 13.8% had someone living alone who was 65 years of age or older. The average household size was 2.55 and the average family size was 3.13.

In the township the population was spread out, with 22.9% under the age of 18, 8.4% from 18 to 24, 24.1% from 25 to 44, 28.3% from 45 to 64, and 16.3% who were 65 years of age or older. The median age was 42 years. For every 100 females, there were 88.6 males. For every 100 females age 18 and over, there were 103.2 males.

The median income for a household in the township was $28,333, and the median income for a family was $32,813. Males had a median income of $25,625 versus $14,821 for females. The per capita income for the township was $13,005. About 7.8% of families and 12.1% of the population were below the poverty line, including 27.0% of those under the age of eighteen and none of those sixty five or over.

== See also ==
- Armenia Mountain Wind Farm
- List of places named after Armenia
