= Overton Township, Pennsylvania =

Township in Pennsylvania, US

Coordinates: 41°38′00″N 76°37′59″W

- Township
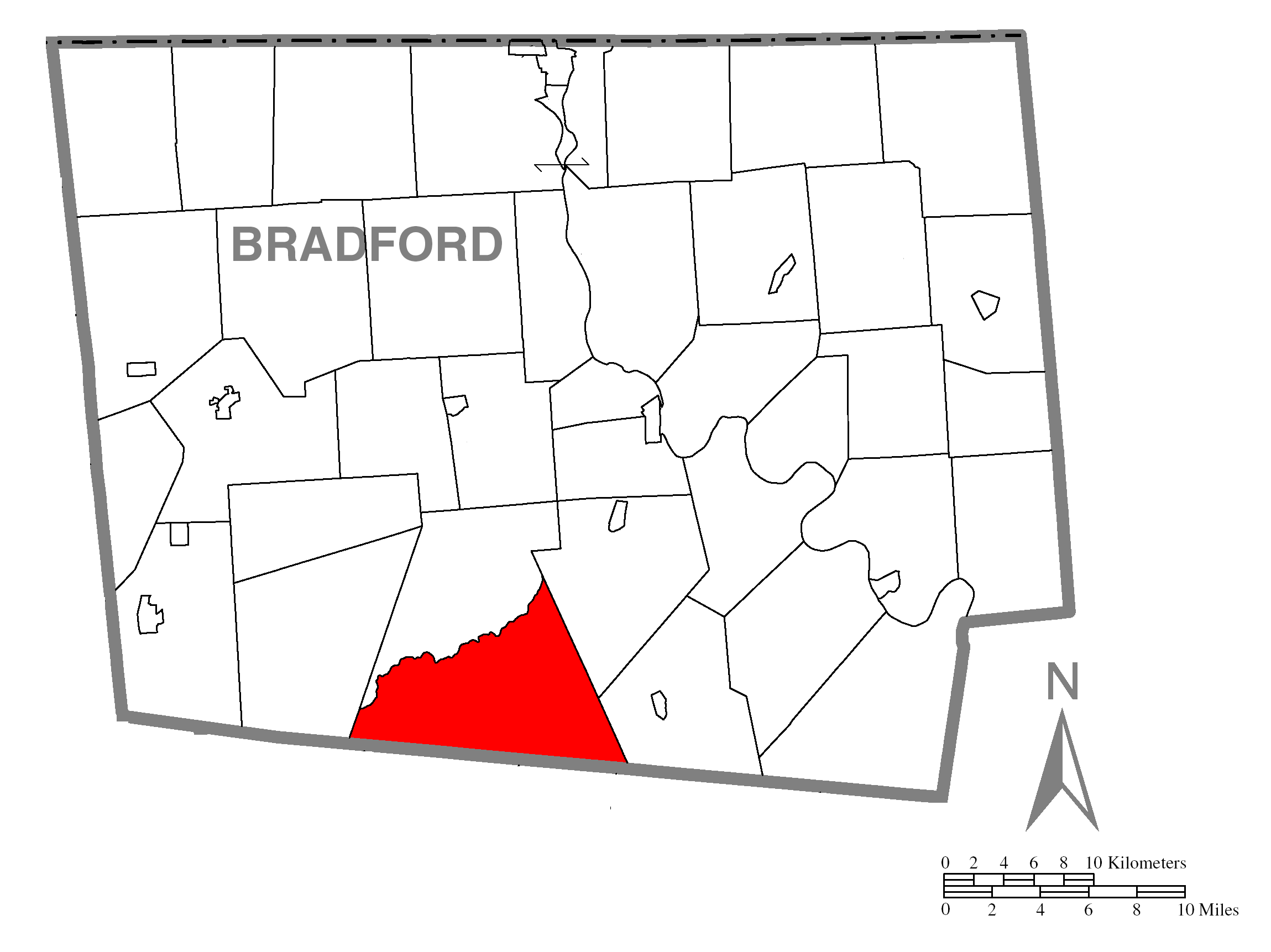
- Map of Bradford County with Overton Township highlighted

- Map of Bradford County, Pennsylvania
- Country: United States
- State: Pennsylvania
- County: Bradford
- Settled: 1806
- Incorporated: 1853

Area
  - Total: 46.97 sq mi (121.66 km^{2})
  - Land: 46.74 sq mi (121.05 km^{2})
  - Water: 0.24 sq mi (0.61 km^{2})

Population (2020)
  - Total: 239 ▼
  - Estimate (2023): 239
  - Density: 5.1/sq mi (1.95/km^{2})
- FIPS code: 42-015-57448

Overton Township is a township in Bradford County, Pennsylvania, United States. It is part of Northeastern Pennsylvania. The population was 239 at the 2020 census.

== Geography ==
Overton Township is located in southern Bradford County and is bordered by Leroy Township to the west, Franklin Township to the north, Monroe Township to the northeast, and Albany Township to the east. To the south, in Sullivan County, are (from east to west) Cherry Township, Forks Township, Elkland Township, and Fox Township. The unincorporated community of Overton is located in the far southeastern corner of the township.

According to the U.S. Census Bureau, the township has a total area of 47.0 square miles (121.7 km^{2}), of which 46.8 square miles (121.1 km^{2}) is land and 0.23 square miles (0.6 km^{2}), or 0.50%, is water.

== Demographics ==
Historical population
Census	Pop.	Note	%±
2010	247		—
2020	239		−3.2%
2023 (est.)	239		0.0%
U.S. Decennial Census

As of the census 2000, 187 people, 78 households, and 53 families reside in the township. The population density was 4.0 per square mile (1.5/km^{2}). There were 266 housing units at an average density of 5.7/sq mi (2.2/km^{2}). The racial makeup of the township was 98.40% White and 1.60% Native American.

There were 78 households, of which 26.9% had children under 18 living with them, 59.0% were married couples living together, 5.1% had a female householder with no husband present, and 30.8% were non-families. 24.4% of all households comprised individuals, and 14.1% had someone who was 65 or older living alone. The average household size was 2.40 and the average family size was 2.85.

In the township the population was spread out, with 19.8% under 18, 3.7% from 18 to 24, 30.5% from 25 to 44, 28.9% from 45 to 64, and 17.1% from 65 or older. The median age was 44 years. For every 100 females, there were 107.8 males. For every 100 females age 18 and over, there were 108.3 males.

The median income for a household in the township was $26,667, and the median income for a family was $31,250. Males had a median income of $33,750 versus $16,875 for females. The per capita income for the township was $13,727. About 16.0% of families and 12.1% of the population were below the poverty line, including none of those under eighteen and 19.4% of those sixty-five or over.
