= Franklin Township, Bradford County, Pennsylvania =

Township in Pennsylvania, US

Coordinates: 41°41′N 76°36′W

- Township
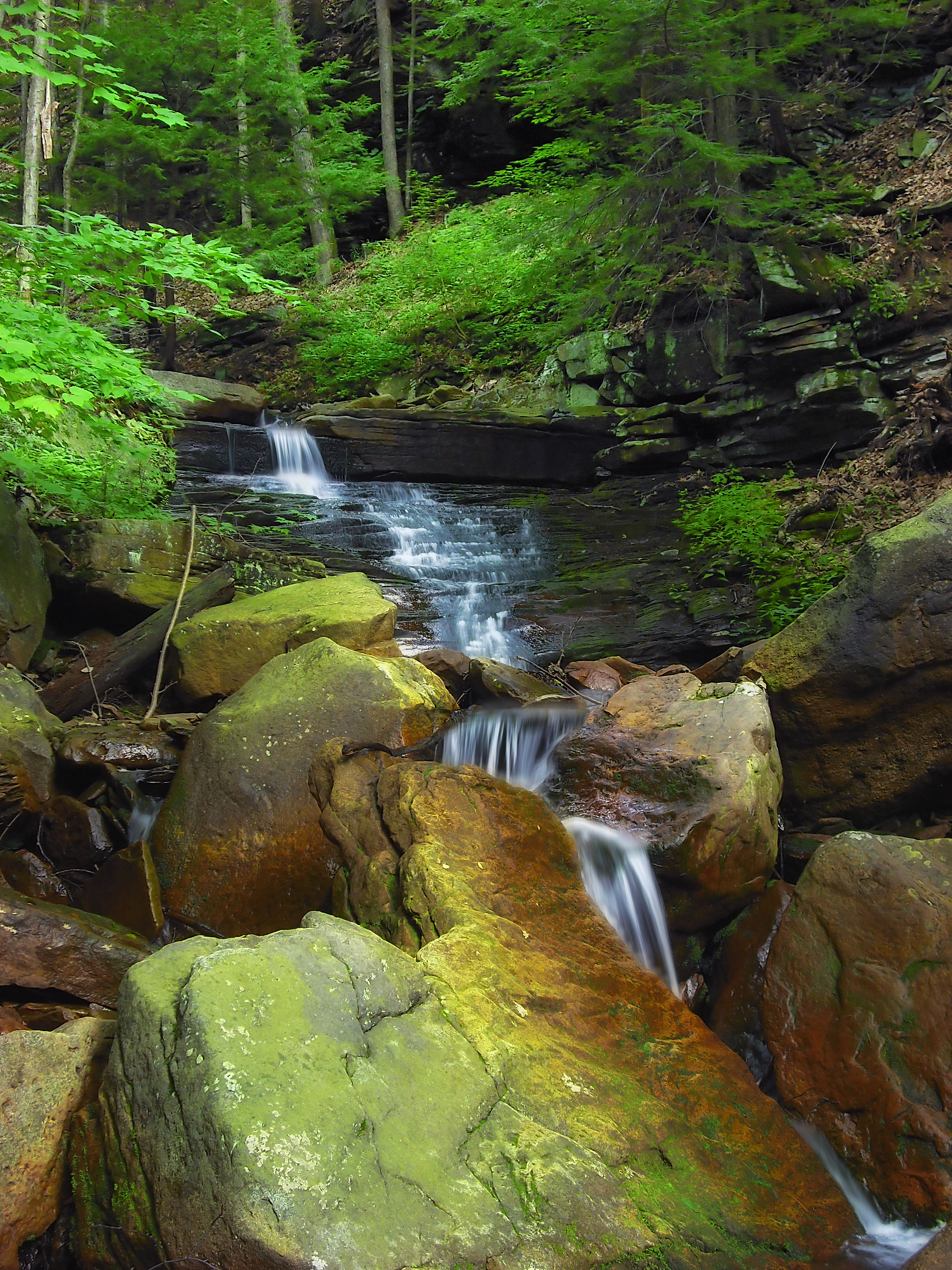
- Waterfalls on Falls Creek on State Game Land 36

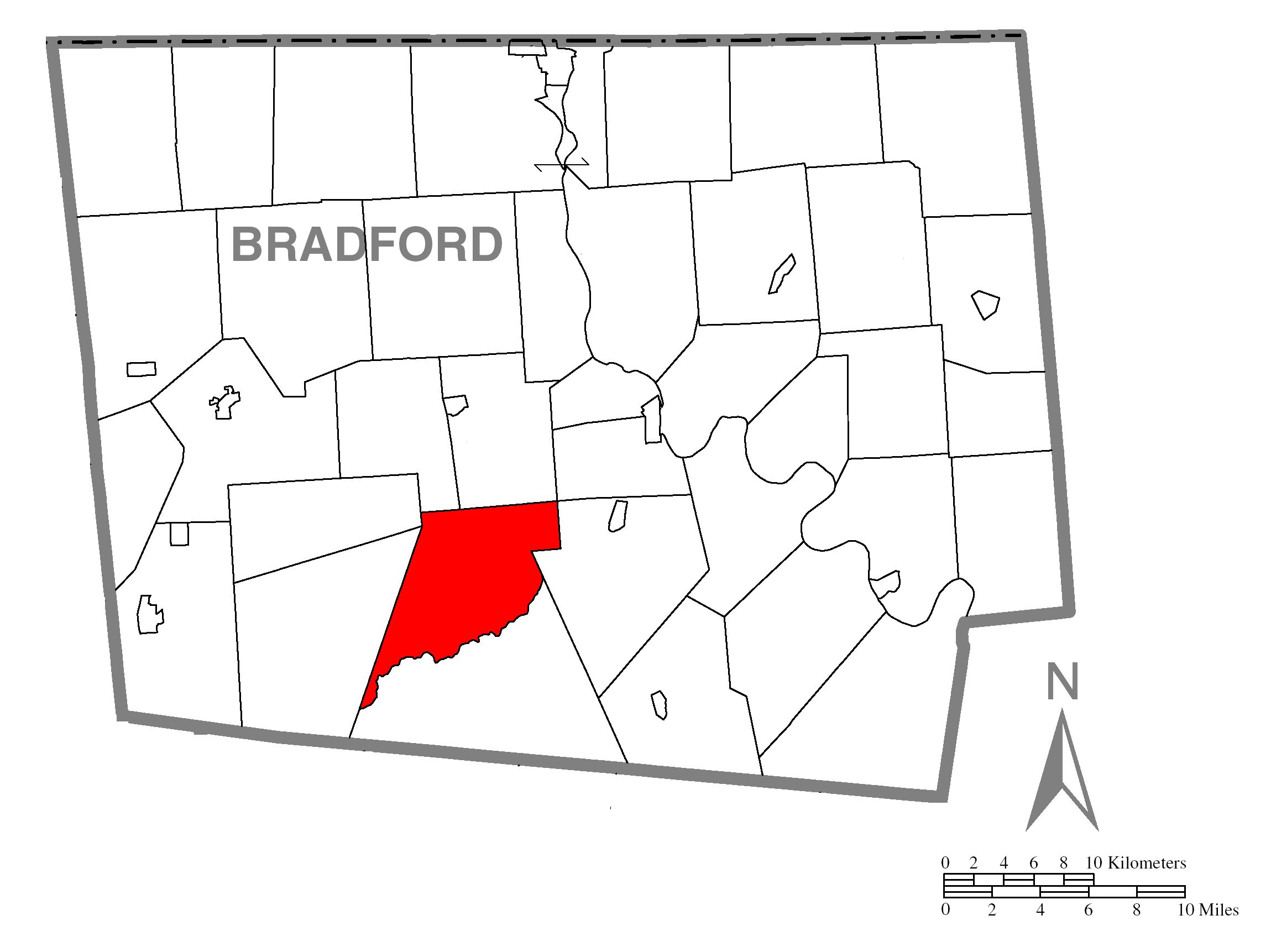
- Map of Bradford County with Franklin Township highlighted

- Map of Bradford County, Pennsylvania
- Country: United States
- State: Pennsylvania
- County: Bradford
- Settled: 1795
- Incorporated: 1819

Area
  - Total: 33.71 sq mi (87.32 km^{2})
  - Land: 33.41 sq mi (86.52 km^{2})
  - Water: 0.31 sq mi (0.80 km^{2})

Population (2020)
  - Total: 619 ▼
  - Estimate (2023): 613
  - Density: 21.2/sq mi (8.17/km^{2})
- FIPS code: 42-015-27344

Franklin Township is a township in Bradford County, Pennsylvania, United States. It is part of Northeastern Pennsylvania. The population was 619 at the 2020 census.

== Geography ==
Franklin Township is located in southern Bradford County. Towanda Creek, a tributary of the Susquehanna River, flows through the northern part of the township, and its southern border is formed by Schrader Creek, a tributary of Towanda Creek. The township is bordered by West Burlington and Burlington townships to the north, Towanda Township at the northeastern corner, Monroe Township to the east, Overton Township to the southeast, Leroy Township to the west, and Granville Township to the northwest. There was a coal mining town named Barclay in the township.

Pennsylvania Route 414 runs through the northern part of the township, following Towanda Creek, and passes through the unincorporated communities of West Franklin and Franklindale. Pennsylvania Route 514 leads northwest from West Franklin into Granville Township.

According to the United States Census Bureau, Franklin Township has a total area of 33.7 square miles (87.3 km^{2}), of which 33.4 square miles (86.5 km^{2}) is land and 0.31 square miles (0.8 km^{2}), or 0.92%, is water.

== Demographics ==
Historical population
Census	Pop.	Note	%±
2010	723		—
2020	619		−14.4%
2023 (est.)	613		−1.0%
U.S. Decennial Census

As of the census of 2000, there were 698 people, 243 households, and 193 families residing in the township. The population density was 20.8 people per square mile (8.0/km^{2}). There were 378 housing units at an average density of 11.3/sq mi (4.3/km^{2}). The racial makeup of the township was 99.43% White, 0.14% Native American, and 0.43% from two or more races.

There were 243 households, out of which 39.1% had children under the age of 18 living with them, 64.2% were married couples living together, 7.0% had a female householder with no husband present, and 20.2% were non-families. 16.0% of all households were made up of individuals, and 5.8% had someone living alone who was 65 years of age or older. The average household size was 2.87 and the average family size was 3.15.

In the township the population was spread out, with 30.1% under the age of 18, 7.6% from 18 to 24, 26.9% from 25 to 44, 22.3% from 45 to 64, and 13.0% who were 65 years of age or older. The median age was 35 years. For every 100 females, there were 102.9 males. For every 100 females age 18 and over, there were 105.9 males.

The median income for a household in the township was $35,909, and the median income for a family was $36,429. Males had a median income of $31,382 versus $24,125 for females. The per capita income for the township was $15,532. About 13.3% of families and 15.9% of the population were below the poverty line, including 19.9% of those under age 18 and 8.9% of those age 65 or over.
