= Leroy Township, Bradford County, Pennsylvania =

Township in Pennsylvania, US

Coordinates: 41°37′00″N 76°45′29″W

Leroy Township, Pennsylvania
- Township
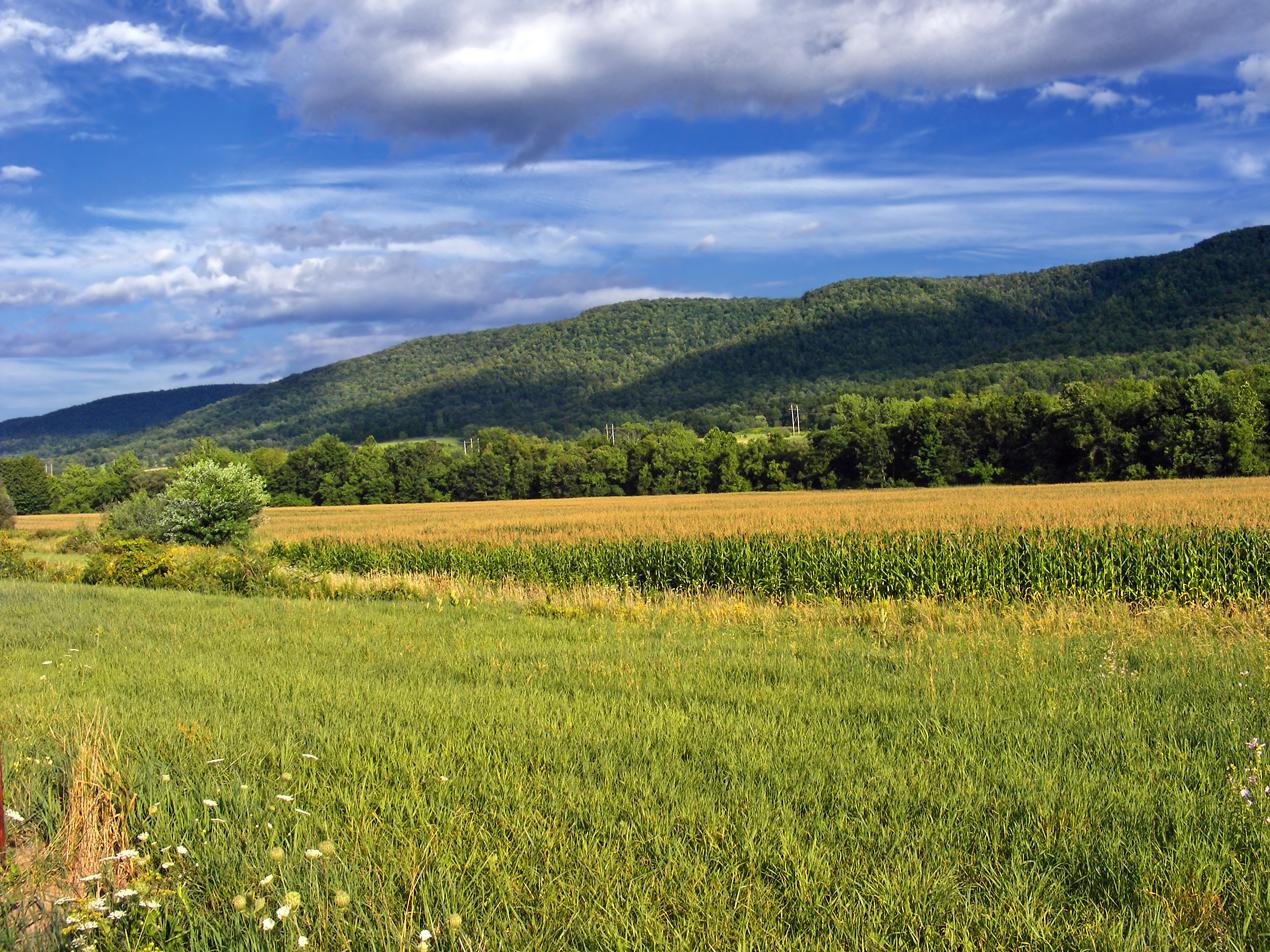
- A ridgeline in Leroy Township

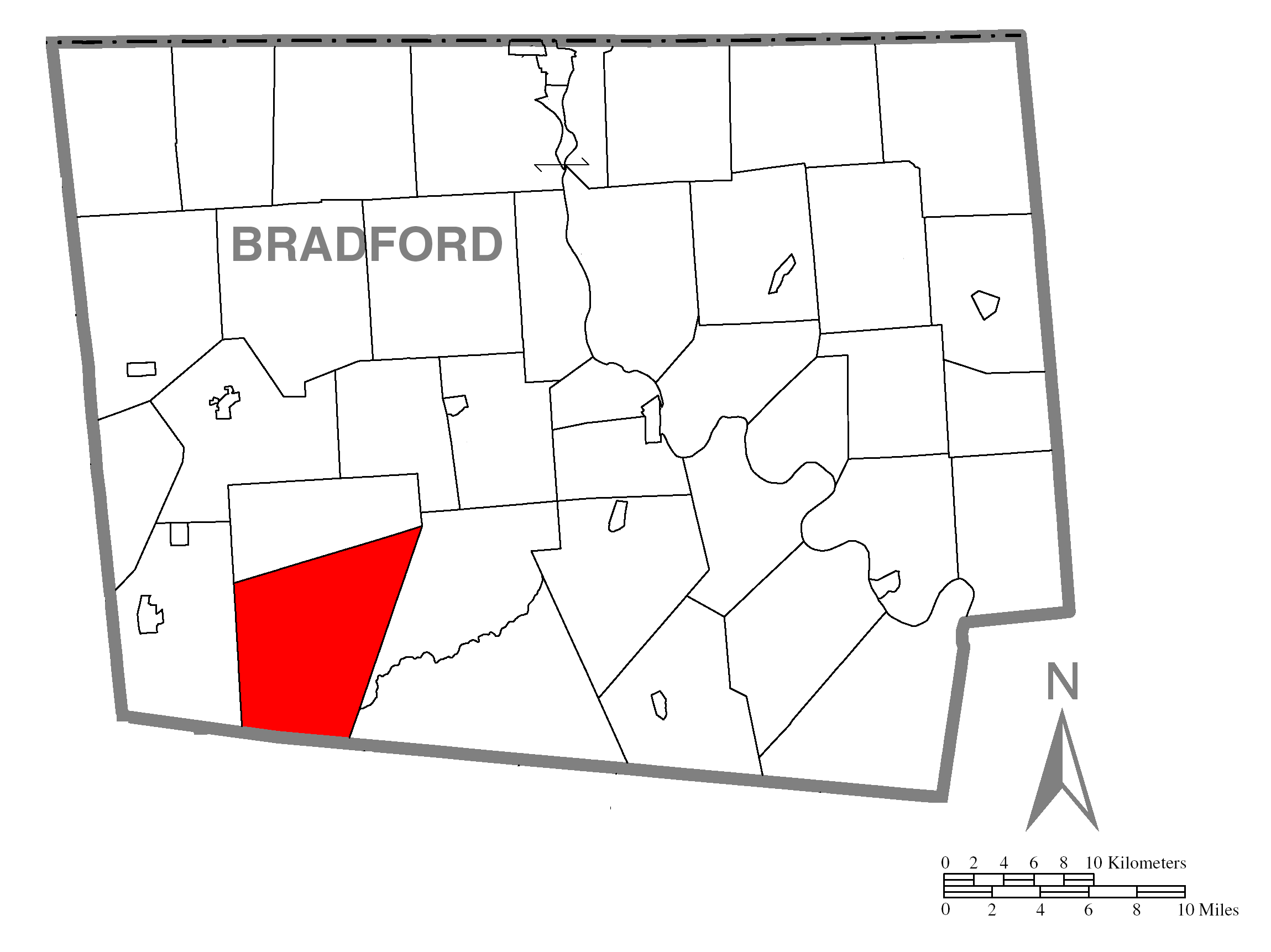
- Map of Bradford County with Leroy Township highlighted

- Map of Bradford County, Pennsylvania
- Country: United States
- State: Pennsylvania
- County: Bradford
- Settled: 1795
- Incorporated: 1835

Area
  - Total: 44.55 sq mi (115.38 km^{2})
  - Land: 44.25 sq mi (114.60 km^{2})
  - Water: 0.30 sq mi (0.78 km^{2})

Population (2020)
  - Total: 632 ▼
  - Estimate (2023): 633
  - Density: 15.9/sq mi (6.13/km^{2})
- FIPS code: 42-015-42856

LeRoy Township is a township in Bradford County, Pennsylvania, United States. It is part of Northeastern Pennsylvania. The population was 632 at the 2020 census.

== Geography ==
Leroy Township is located in southwestern Bradford County and is bordered by Canton Township to the west, Granville Township to the north, Franklin and Overton townships to the east, and Fox Township in Sullivan County to the south.

Pennsylvania Route 414 runs through the northern part of the township, following Towanda Creek, a tributary of the Susquehanna River, and passing through the unincorporated communities of Leroy and West Leroy.

According to the United States Census Bureau, the township has a total area of 44.6 square miles (115.4 km^{2}), of which 44.2 square miles (114.6 km^{2}) is land and 0.31 square miles (0.8 km^{2}), or 0.68%, is water.

== Demographics ==
Historical population
Census	Pop.	Note	%±
2010	718		—
2020	632		−12.0%
2023 (est.)	633		0.2%
U.S. Decennial Census

As of the census of 2000, there were 627 people, 235 households, and 185 families residing in the township. The population density was 14.0 people per square mile (5.4/km^{2}). There were 320 housing units at an average density of 7.1/sq mi (2.8/km^{2}). The racial makeup of the township was 98.88% White, 0.16% African American, 0.16% Asian, 0.16% from other races, and 0.64% from two or more races. Hispanic or Latino of any race were 0.16% of the population.

There were 235 households, out of which 34.5% had children under the age of 18 living with them, 71.1% were married couples living together, 6.0% had a female householder with no husband present, and 20.9% were non-families. 18.3% of all households were made up of individuals, and 8.9% had someone living alone who was 65 years of age or older. The average household size was 2.67 and the average family size was 3.02.

In the township the population was spread out, with 27.3% under the age of 18, 6.9% from 18 to 24, 28.1% from 25 to 44, 26.5% from 45 to 64, and 11.3% who were 65 years of age or older. The median age was 38 years. For every 100 females, there were 113.3 males. For every 100 females age 18 and over, there were 108.2 males.

The median income for a household in the township was $35,938, and the median income for a family was $38,646. Males had a median income of $30,125 versus $21,071 for females. The per capita income for the township was $15,087. About 10.4% of families and 11.3% of the population were below the poverty line, including 10.1% of those under age 18 and 11.4% of those age 65 or over.
