= Pennsylvania Route 415 =

State highway in Luzerne and Wyoming counties in Pennsylvania, United States

Pennsylvania Route 415
- PA 415 in red (Section maintained as SR 1415 east of Harvey's lake)

Route information
- Maintained by PennDOT
- Length: 10.035 mi (16.150 km)
- Existed: 1928–present

Major junctions
- South end: PA 309 in Dallas
- PA 118 in Dallas Township
- North end: PA 29 in Noxen Township

Location
- Country: United States
- State: Pennsylvania
- Counties: Luzerne, Wyoming

Highway system
- Pennsylvania State Route System; Interstate; US; State; Scenic; Legislative
← PA 414	→ PA 416
← PA 514	PA 515	→ PA 516

Pennsylvania Route 415 (PA 415, designated by the Pennsylvania Department of Transportation as SR 0415) is a 10.035-mile-long (16.150 km) state highway located in Luzerne and Wyoming counties in Pennsylvania. The southern terminus is at PA 309 in Dallas while the northern terminus is at PA 29 near Harveys Lake in the community of Ruggles. A rare feature of this road is that the right-of-way splits in Harveys Lake, where the State Route 0415 (SR 0415) alignment heads along the western side of Harveys Lake, while SR 1415 heads along the eastern side. The two routes merge several miles north.

Originally, PA 415 was designated from PA 92 (now PA 309) in Dallas along its current alignment until the current PA 29 intersection, where it turned southward to an intersection with PA 115 in the community of Kyttles, where the designation terminated. The route around the eastern side of Harveys Lake was designated as PA 515 in 1928 along with PA 415. In 1946, PA 515 was decommissioned entirely and PA 415 was truncated back to the new PA 29 in Ruggles. At that point, PA 415 was signed in both directions, with the SR 1415 designation coming along by 1990.

== Route description ==
=== Dallas to SR 1415 ===
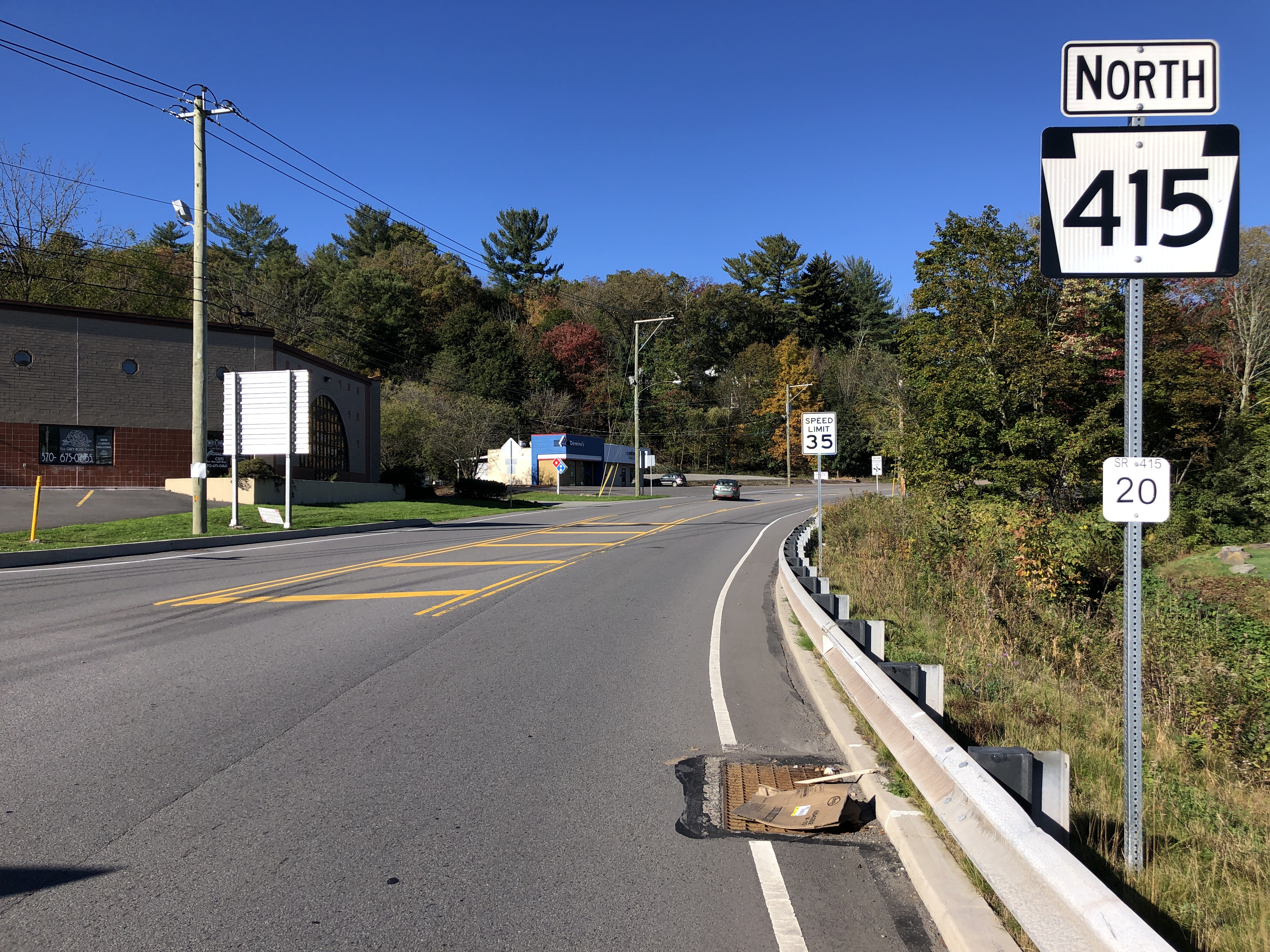
PA 415 northbound in Dallas

PA 415 begins at an intersection with PA 309 (Tunkhannock Highway) in the borough of Dallas in the Back Mountain region of Luzerne County. The route heads westward through the community as Memorial Highway, passing to the north of residential homes and to the south of commercial businesses. The route bends along a large curve, passing several hotels and entering a five-pronged intersection with Lake, Church and Main Street in Dallas. After that intersection, PA 415 continues on its northwest progression, running through the highly populous area, including farms and the Dallas Township Department of Public Works. After passing a large factory, PA 415 enters a less populated section of farmland and industrial buildings.

A distance later into Dallas Township, PA 415 becomes a divided highway, intersecting with PA 118 near the Chapel Hill Memorial Park. Paralleling the southern side of the park, the highway continues through a wealthy community, passing along power lines and a large recreational vehicle dealership. At an intersection with Briar Crest Road, PA 415 enters the small community of Idetown. The highway leaves Idetown shortly after entering, beginning a short northward progression into the community of Shawanese, a wealthy community on the side of the borough of Harveys Lake. In Shawanese, PA 415 reaches an intersection with SR 1415 (Lakeside Drive), where the right-of-way of PA 415 splits into two bi-directional highways.

=== Harveys Lake split ===
==== SR 0415 (western side) ====
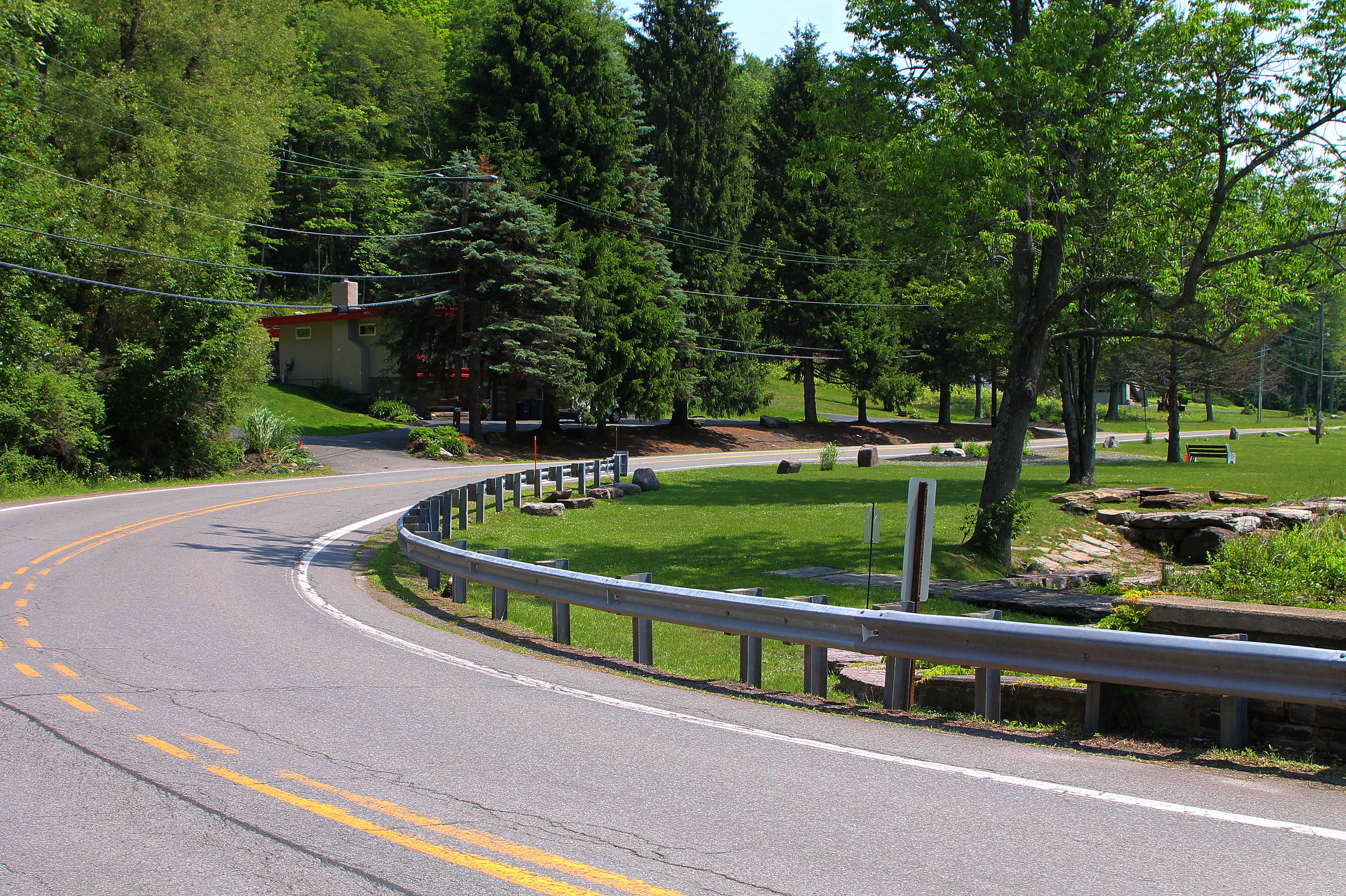
PA 415 on the western side of Harveys Lake

The alignment of PA 415 splits at Harveys Lake, with signage heading around both directions. The alignment of SR 0415 heads along the western side of the lake, passing through the small lakeside community. The route crosses over a short portion of Harveys Lake, turning to the north a short distance later. The lakeside community passes several lakeside homes for a distance, also winding its way through the forestry on the eastern side of the lake. The forestry continues until approaching a hairpin turn along the lake. At an intersection with Outlet Road, PA 415 makes the hairpin turn, crossing over an outlet from Harveys Lake, and continuing to the northeast along the shoreline of Harveys Lake once again.

PA 415 continues northward, intersecting with the local roads and passing through several local lakeside communities. The two-lane highway gains the moniker of Berbal Road and continues along the shoreline. The population along the shore remains consistent for several miles while the landlocked side begins to dissipate along the western side. After an intersection with Anderson Road, PA 415 makes a large lakeside curve, heading to the southeast along lakeside homes. After crossing on another gradual hairpin turn, the route passes a large beach and park, entering the community of Laketon. PA 415 continues along the northern side of Harveys Lake, serving the populated lakeside community until entering the community of Harveys Lake, where PA 415 intersects with the northern terminus of SR 1415 and the mainline turns northward along Noxen Road.

At the intersection with SR 1415, the mainline of PA 415 turns northward onto Noxen Road. There, the route continues through a less populated area of Harveys Lake, passing through major fields and tree fields. The route continues northward, passing through a rural area and crossing into Wyoming County from Luzerne County. After emerging from the tree patches, PA 415 reaches an intersection with PA 29 (Lake Road) in the community of Ruggles, where the designation terminates and the right-of-way continues along PA 29.

==== SR 1415 (eastern side) ====
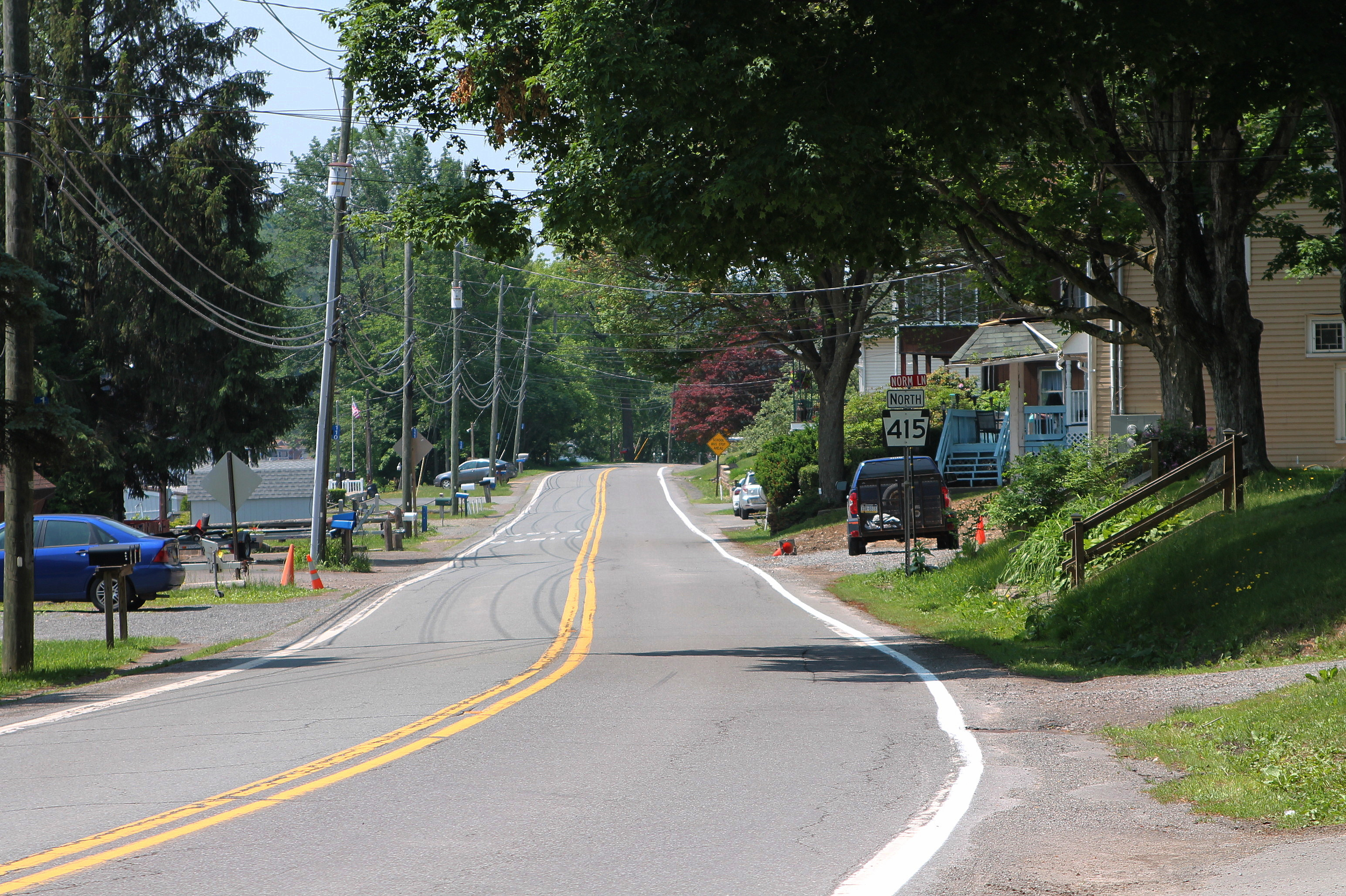
The eastern part of PA 415 on the northern side of Harveys Lake

In the community of Shawanaese, where PA 415 darts to the south along the western lakeside, SR 1415 (also signed as PA 415) heads along the eastern side of the lake. The route heads northward along Lakeside Drive, passing through the wealthy communities. Paralleling its sister route across shores, SR 1415 heads through a large populous area, serving several access roads to and from the lake. Compared to its sister route, which went straight for most of its distance, the eastern roadway curves along the lake more often. The route continues, turning eastward along the hammer-shaped shoreline of Harveys Lake. After an intersection with Carrie Street, SR 1415 reaches a large hairpin turn along the easternmost portion of Harveys Lake, passing several local tennis courts and intersecting with local roads. The route heads westward along Lakeside Drive, entering the community of Harveys Lake, which is populous on the northern side of the lake. After passing a plethora of lakeside homes, SR 1415 intersects with the PA 415 mainline and ends in Harveys Lake. SR 1415 is 3.843 miles (6.185 km) long.

== History ==
Pennsylvania Route 515
- Location: Harveys Lake
- Existed: 1928–1946

PA 415 was originally designated in the 1928 mass state highway numbering throughout Pennsylvania. When designated, PA 415 went from PA 115 (former PA 15) in the community of Kyttle. At that point, PA 415 went through Harveys Lake and Ruggles onto current PA 29 to Kyttle. The southern terminus was also designated as PA 92. The eastbound side of the lake was designated as PA 515 in the 1928 numbering. In 1932, construction of PA 415 was completed from Mooretown Road to the Luzerne/Wyoming County line, with the portion now PA 29 finishing in 1934. This alignment remained intact for only twelve years, when the Pennsylvania Department of Highways decommissioned PA 515 and truncated PA 415 back to an intersection with PA 29 in Ruggles. At that point, PA 415 was designated on both sides of Harveys Lake, with the eastbound side by 1990 being designated as SR 1415.

== Major intersections ==
County	Location	mi	km	Destinations	Notes
Luzerne	Dallas	0.000	0.000	PA 309 (Memorial Highway / Tunkhannock Highway)	Southern terminus
Luzerne	Dallas Township	2.173	3.497	PA 118 west – Williamsport	Eastern terminus of PA 118
Luzerne	Harveys Lake	4.498	7.239	SR 1415 north (Lakeside Drive)	PA 415 designations split here; former southern terminus of PA 515
Luzerne	Harveys Lake	8.799	14.161	SR 1415 south (Lakeside Drive)	PA 415 designations merge here; former northern terminus of PA 515
Wyoming	Noxen Township	10.035	16.150	PA 29 (Lake Road)	Northern terminus
1.000 mi = 1.609 km; 1.000 km = 0.621 mi
