= Monroe, Pennsylvania =

Borough in Pennsylvania, US

Monroe, Pennsylvania Monroeton
- Borough
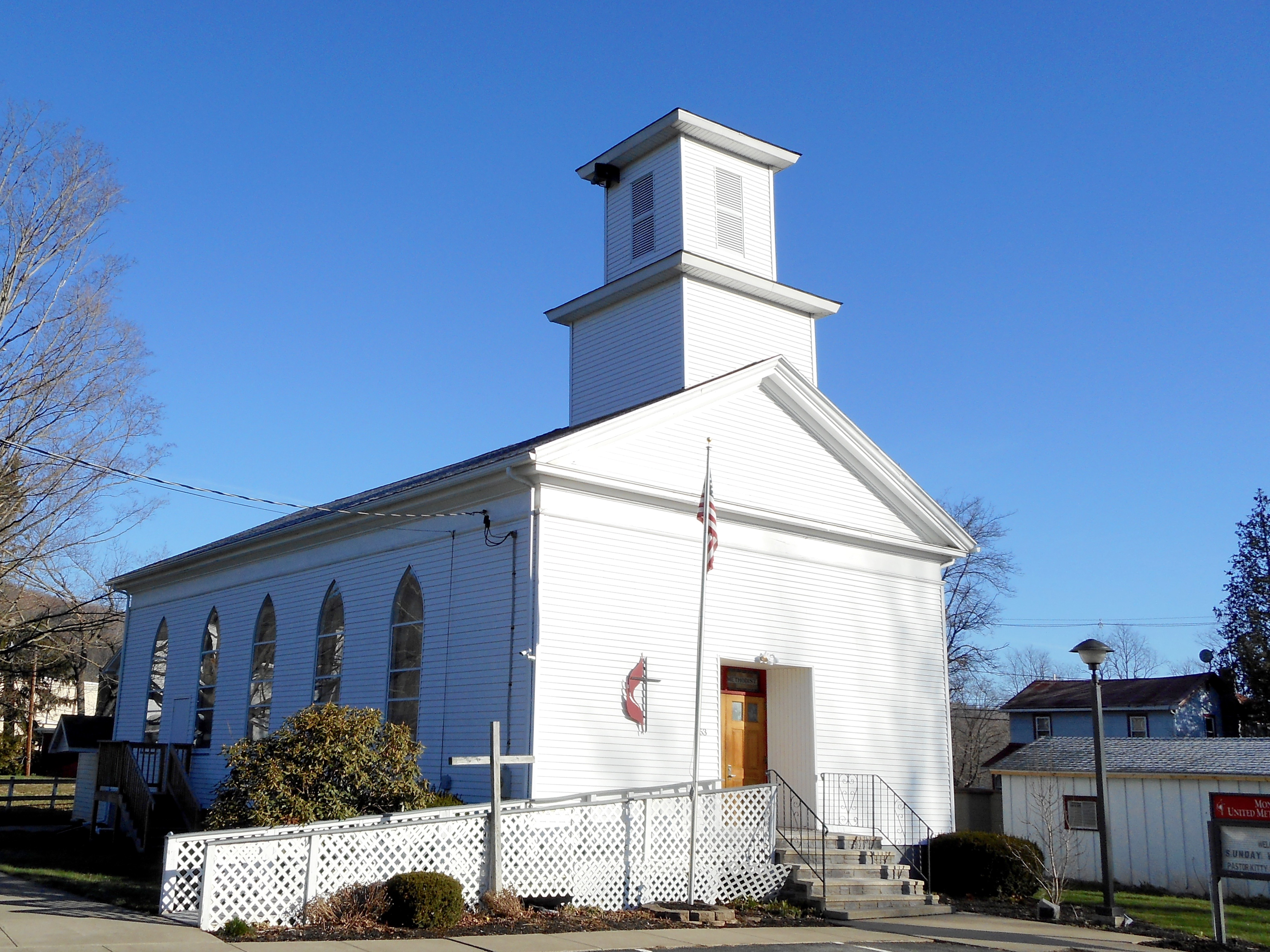
- Monroeton United Methodist Church

- Location of Monroe in Bradford County, Pennsylvania.

- Location of Monroe in the state of Pennsylvania
- Coordinates: 41°42′46″N 76°28′31″W
- Country: United States
- State: Pennsylvania
- County: Bradford
- Settled: 1828
- Incorporated: 1855

Area
  - Total: 0.50 sq mi (1.29 km^{2})
  - Land: 0.49 sq mi (1.28 km^{2})
  - Water: 0.0077 sq mi (0.02 km^{2})
- Elevation: 1,047 ft (319 m)

Population (2020)
  - Total: 478
  - Density: 968/sq mi (373.8/km^{2})
- Time zone: UTC-5 (Eastern (EST))
  - Summer (DST): UTC-4 (EDT)
- ZIP Code: 18832
- Area code: 570
- FIPS code: 42-50432
- Website: Borough website

Monroe (also referred to as Monroeton) is a borough in Bradford County, Pennsylvania, United States. It is part of Northeastern Pennsylvania. The population was 482 at the 2020 census.

== Geography ==
Monroeton is located in south-central Bradford County at 41°42′46″N 76°28′31″W (41.712709, -76.475308), in the valley of Towanda Creek, a tributary of the Susquehanna River. The borough is surrounded by Monroe Township but is separate from it. Monroeton was described in 1940 as "a Y-shaped farming village of small vine-covered houses."

U.S. Route 220 passes through the borough, leading north 4 miles (6 km) to Towanda, the county seat, and south 9 miles (14 km) to New Albany. Pennsylvania Route 414 leads west from the borough 21 miles (34 km) to Canton.

According to the U.S. Census Bureau, the borough has a total area of 0.50 square miles (1.3 km^{2}), of which 0.004 square miles (0.01 km^{2}), or 1.01%, is water.

While the official name of the borough is "Monroe", inhabitants refer to the community as "Monroeton". The U.S. Post Office there is "Monroeton, PA 18832" and the road signs at the borough limits say "Monroeton".

== Demographics ==
Historical population
Census	Pop.	Note	%±
1860	244		—
1870	293		20.1%
1880	383		30.7%
1890	496		29.5%
1900	385		−22.4%
1910	403		4.7%
1920	405		0.5%
1930	414		2.2%
1940	428		3.4%
1950	466		8.9%
1960	502		7.7%
1970	627		24.9%
1980	627		0.0%
1990	540		−13.9%
2000	514		−4.8%
2010	554		7.8%
2020	478		−13.7%
2021 (est.)	487	▲	1.9%

As of the census of 2000, there were 514 people, 207 households, and 150 families residing in the borough. The population density was 789.6 inhabitants per square mile (304.9/km^{2}). There were 224 housing units at an average density of 344.1 per square mile (132.9/km^{2}). The racial makeup of the borough was 97.08% White, 0.39% African American, 0.39% Native American, 0.58% from other races, and 1.56% from two or more races. Hispanic or Latino of any race were 0.58% of the population.

There were 207 households, out of which 33.8% had children under the age of 18 living with them, 58.9% were married couples living together, 9.7% had a female householder with no husband present, and 27.5% were non-families. 21.7% of all households were made up of individuals, and 9.7% had someone living alone who was 65 years of age or older. The average household size was 2.48 and the average family size was 2.87.

In the borough the population was spread out, with 26.8% under the age of 18, 3.9% from 18 to 24, 27.0% from 25 to 44, 27.4% from 45 to 64, and 14.8% who were 65 years of age or older. The median age was 40 years. For every 100 females there were 100.8 males. For every 100 females age 18 and over, there were 90.9 males.

The median income for a household in the borough was $38,750, and the median income for a family was $43,125. Males had a median income of $35,179 versus $25,625 for females. The per capita income for the borough was $18,242. About 7.1% of families and 12.9% of the population were below the poverty line, including 22.9% of those under age 18 and none of those age 65 or over.
