= Granville Township, Bradford County, Pennsylvania =

Township in Pennsylvania, US

Coordinates: 41°41′00″N 76°45′29″W

- Township
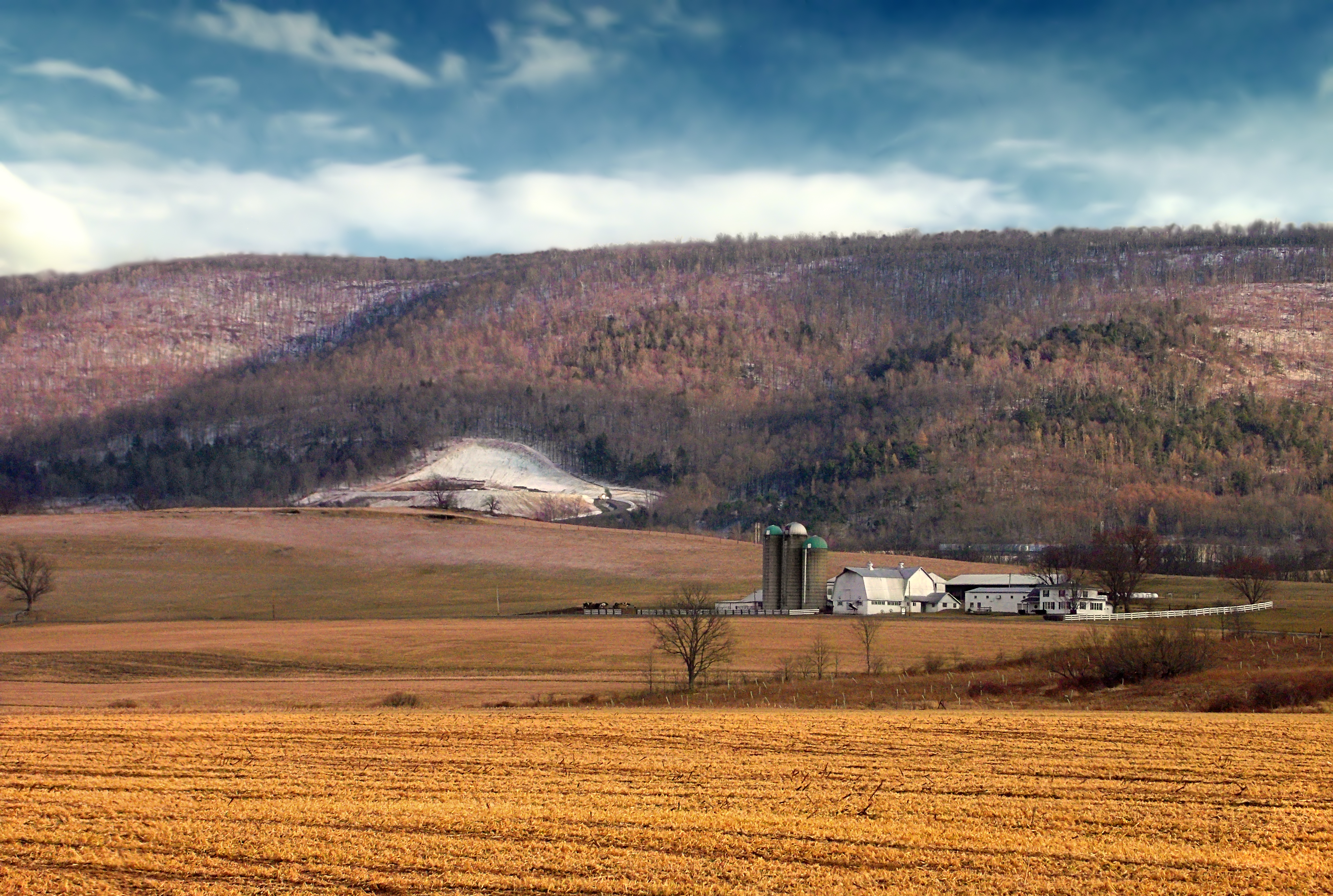

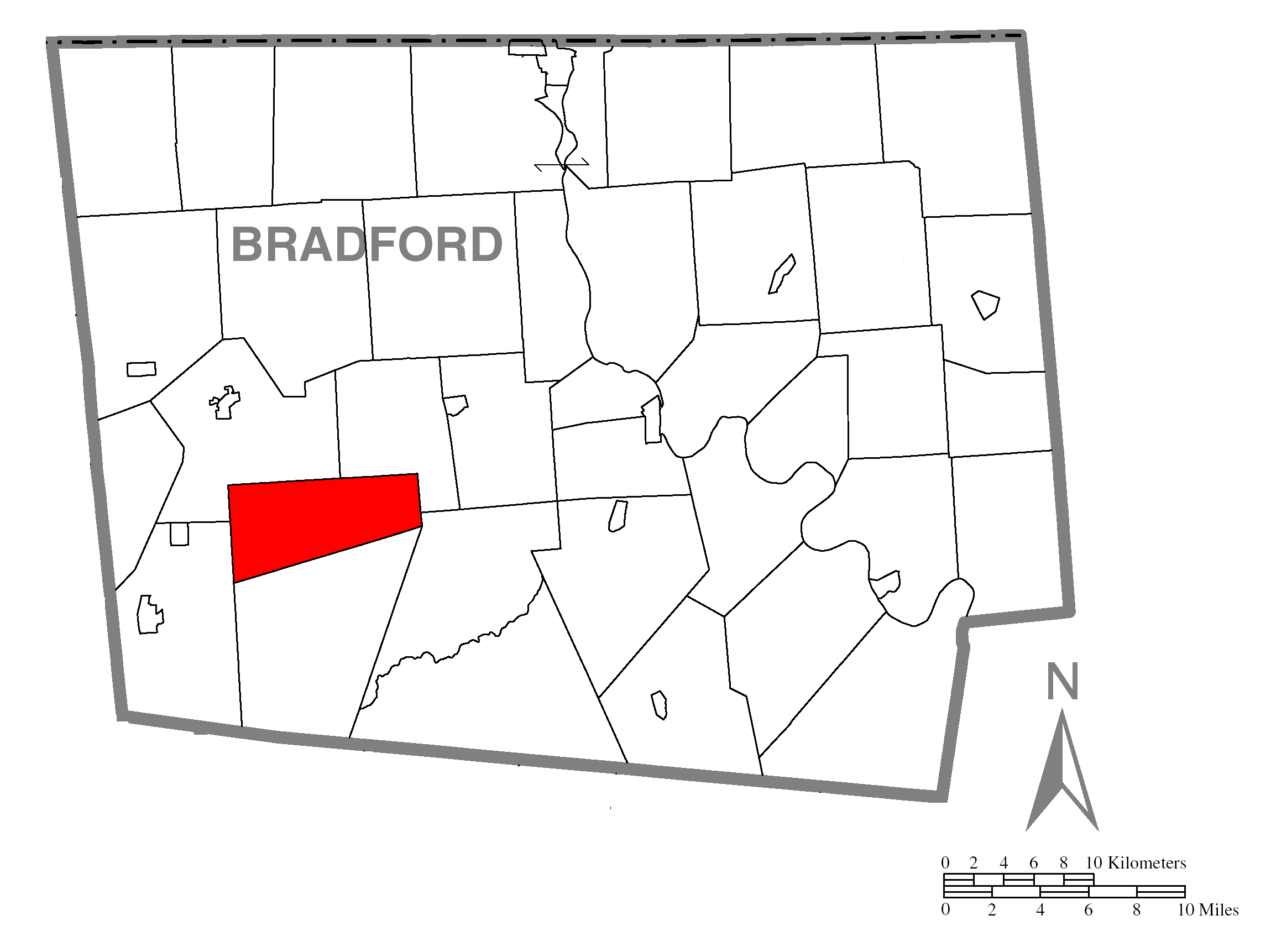
- Map of Bradford County with Granville Township highlighted

- Map of Bradford County, Pennsylvania
- Country: United States
- State: Pennsylvania
- County: Bradford
- Settled: 1799
- Incorporated: 1831

Area
  - Total: 24.70 sq mi (63.96 km^{2})
  - Land: 24.64 sq mi (63.82 km^{2})
  - Water: 0.054 sq mi (0.14 km^{2})

Population (2020)
  - Total: 896
  - Estimate (2023): 896
  - Density: 37.5/sq mi (14.49/km^{2})
- FIPS code: 42-015-30464

Granville Township is a township in Bradford County, Pennsylvania, United States. It is part of Northeastern Pennsylvania. The population was 896 at the 2020 census. Children residing in the township are assigned to attend the Troy Area School District.

== Geography ==
Granville Township is located in southwestern Bradford County, bordered by West Burlington Township to the north and east, Franklin Township to the east, Leroy Township to the south, Canton Township to the west and Troy Township to the west and north.

Pennsylvania Route 514 runs the length of the township east to west, following the valley of the North Branch of Towanda Creek, and passing through the unincorporated community of Granville Center near the middle of the township. Granville Summit is located near the western border of the township.

According to the United States Census Bureau, the township has a total area of 24.7 square miles (64.0 km^{2}), of which 24.6 square miles (63.8 km^{2}) is land and 0.04 square miles (0.1 km^{2}), or 0.22%, is water.

== Demographics ==
Historical population
Census	Pop.	Note	%±
2020	896		—
2023 (est.)	896		0.0%
U.S. Decennial Census

As of the census of 2000, there were 873 people, 314 households, and 247 families residing in the township. The population density was 35.3 inhabitants per square mile (13.6/km^{2}). There were 363 housing units at an average density of 14.7/sq mi (5.7/km^{2}). The racial makeup of the township was 98.17% White, 0.57% African American, 0.34% Native American, 0.46% from other races, and 0.46% from two or more races. Hispanic or Latino of any race were 0.92% of the population.

There were 314 households, out of which 32.2% had children under the age of 18 living with them, 69.1% were married couples living together, 6.4% had a female householder with no husband present, and 21.3% were non-families. 18.5% of all households were made up of individuals, and 6.4% had someone living alone who was 65 years of age or older. The average household size was 2.78 and the average family size was 3.14.

In the township the population was spread out, with 27.4% under the age of 18, 7.2% from 18 to 24, 26.0% from 25 to 44, 27.0% from 45 to 64, and 12.4% who were 65 years of age or older. The median age was 38 years. For every 100 females, there were 105.4 males. For every 100 females age 18 and over, there were 101.9 males.

The median income for a household in the township was $38,750, and the median income for a family was $41,538. Males had a median income of $30,536 versus $20,417 for females. The per capita income for the township was $14,211. About 12.5% of families and 14.0% of the population were below the poverty line, including 16.2% of those under age 18 and 15.0% of those age 65 or over.

== Personalities ==
Vance Packard (1914-1996), publicist
