= Columbia Cross Roads, Pennsylvania =

Unincorporated community in Pennsylvania, US

- Unincorporated community
- Location within Pennsylvania
- Coordinates: 41°50′09″N 76°48′07″W
- Country: United States
- State: Pennsylvania
- County: Bradford
- Elevation: 1,135 ft (346 m)
- Time zone: UTC-5 (Eastern (EST))
  - Summer (DST): UTC-4 (EDT)
- ZIP code: 16914
- Area codes: 272 & 570
- GNIS feature ID: 1172245

Columbia Cross Roads is an unincorporated community in Bradford County, Pennsylvania, United States. The community is located along Pennsylvania Route 14, 3.5 miles (5.6 km) north of Troy. Columbia Cross Roads has a post office with ZIP code 16914.
