= Canton Township, Bradford County, Pennsylvania =

Township in Pennsylvania, US

Coordinates: 41°37′00″N 76°52′30″W

- Township
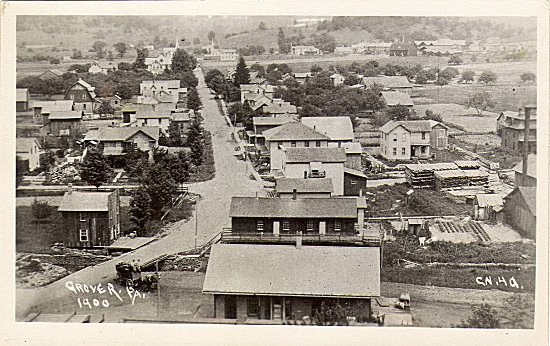
- Grover in 1900

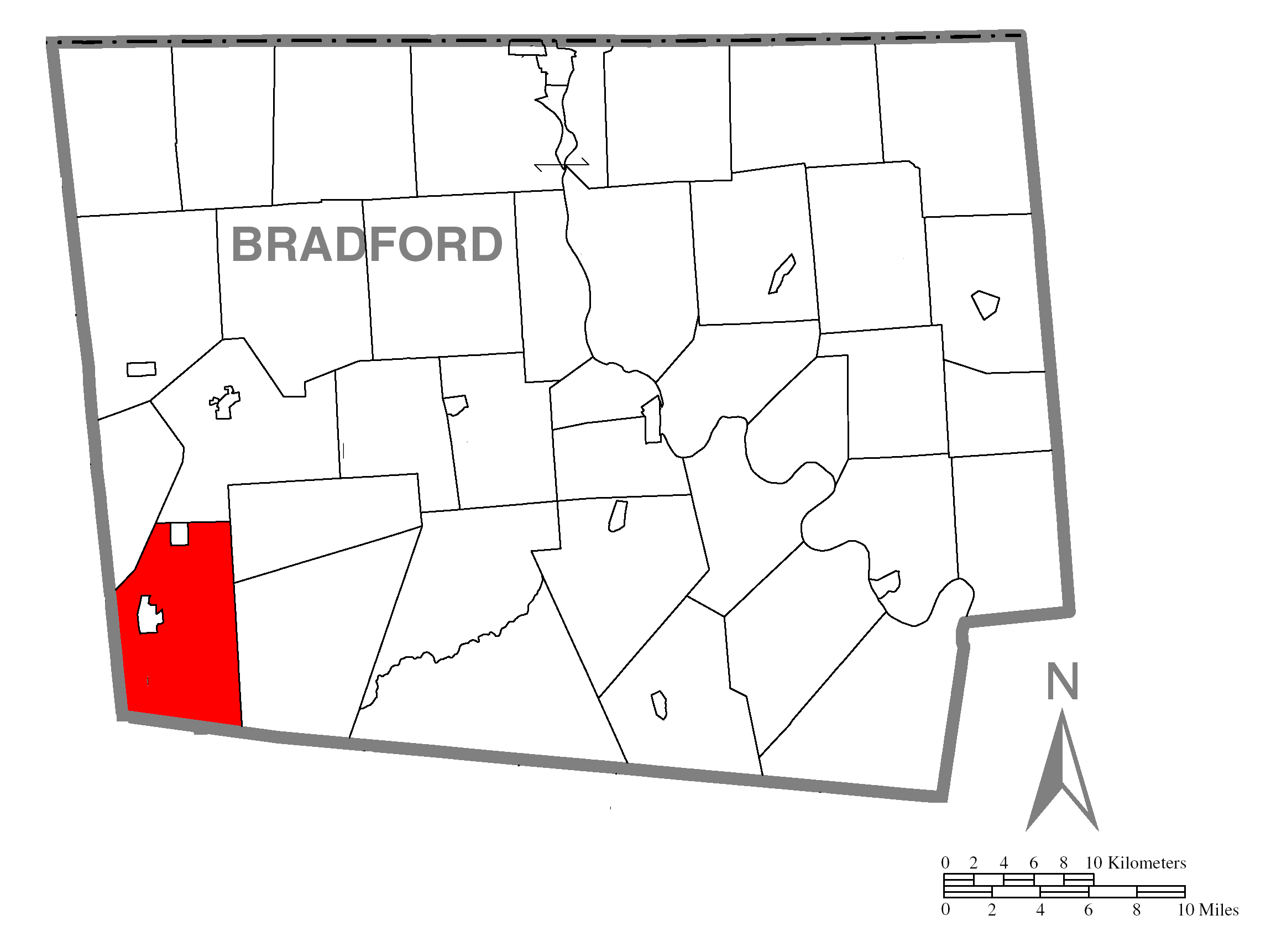
- Map of Bradford County with Canton Township highlighted

- Map of Bradford County, Pennsylvania
- Country: United States
- State: Pennsylvania
- County: Bradford
- Settled: 1796
- Incorporated: 1804

Area
  - Total: 37.30 sq mi (96.61 km^{2})
  - Land: 37.14 sq mi (96.20 km^{2})
  - Water: 0.16 sq mi (0.42 km^{2})

Population (2020)
  - Total: 1,943 ▼
  - Estimate (2023): 2,031
  - Density: 56/sq mi (21.6/km^{2})
- FIPS code: 42-015-11168

Canton Township is a township in Bradford County, Pennsylvania, United States. It is part of Northeastern Pennsylvania. The population was 1,943 at the 2020 census.

== Geography ==
Canton Township is located in the southwestern corner of Bradford County. It is bordered by Armenia Township to the northwest, Troy Township to the north, Granville Township to the northeast, and Leroy Township to the east. To the southeast, in Sullivan County, is Fox Township, and to the south, in Lycoming County, is McNett Township. To the west is Tioga County, with Union Township due west and Ward Township to the northwest. Canton Township surrounds the borough of Canton and forms the eastern, southern, and western borders of Alba.

According to the United States Census Bureau, the township has a total area of 37.3 square miles (96.6 km^{2}), of which 37.1 square miles (96.2 km^{2}) is land and 0.15 square miles (0.4 km^{2}), or 0.43%, is water.

== Demographics ==
Historical population
Census	Pop.	Note	%±
2010	2,143		—
2020	1,943		−9.3%
2023 (est.)	2,031		4.5%
U.S. Decennial Census

As of the census of 2000, there were 2,084 people, 771 households, and 591 families residing in the township. The population density was 56.5 inhabitants per square mile (21.8/km^{2}). There were 858 housing units at an average density of 23.3/sq mi (9.0/km^{2}). The racial makeup of the township was 98.37% White, 0.53% African American, 0.10% Native American, 0.10% Asian, 0.19% from other races, and 0.72% from two or more races. Hispanic or Latino of any race were 0.34% of the population.

There were 771 households, out of which 33.6% had children under the age of 18 living with them, 63.8% were married couples living together, 6.2% had a female householder with no husband present, and 23.3% were non-families. 18.3% of all households were made up of individuals, and 9.5% had someone living alone who was 65 years of age or older. The average household size was 2.68 and the average family size was 3.00.

In the township the population was spread out, with 26.9% under the age of 18, 7.1% from 18 to 24, 26.0% from 25 to 44, 25.1% from 45 to 64, and 14.8% who were 65 years of age or older. The median age was 38 years. For every 100 females, there were 103.5 males. For every 100 females age 18 and over, there were 96.0 males.

The median income for a household in the township was $34,130, and the median income for a family was $36,780. Males had a median income of $27,826 versus $19,970 for females. The per capita income for the township was $15,013. About 10.0% of families and 13.0% of the population were below the poverty line, including 20.1% of those under age 18 and 7.4% of those age 65 or over.
