= Canton, Pennsylvania =

Borough in Pennsylvania, US

- Borough
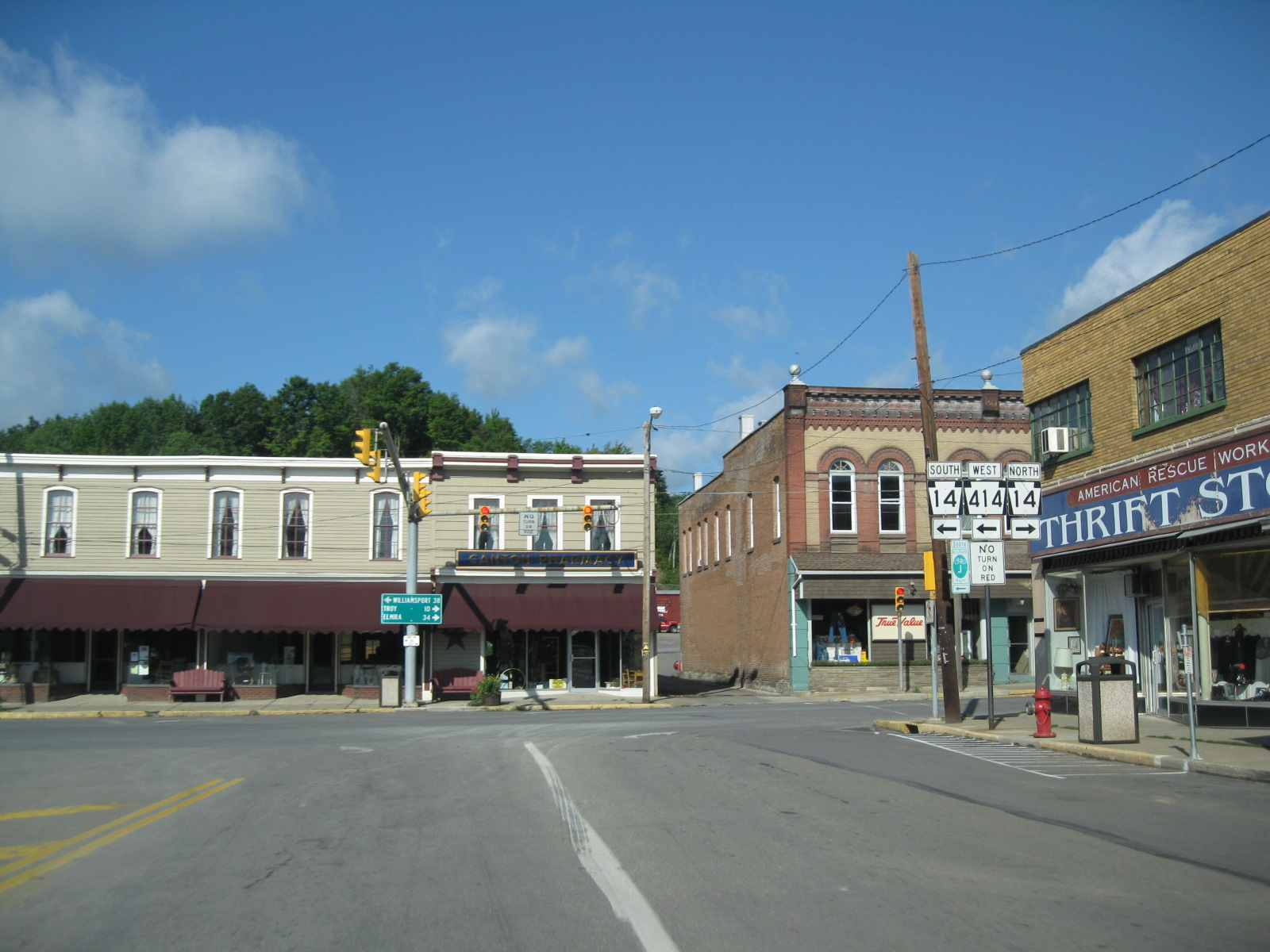
- Downtown Canton

- Location of Canton in Bradford County, Pennsylvania.

- Location of Canton in the state of Pennsylvania
- Coordinates: 41°39′21″N 76°51′03″W
- Country: United States
- State: Pennsylvania
- County: Bradford
- Settled: 1796
- Incorporated: 1864

Area
  - Total: 1.16 sq mi (3.00 km^{2})
  - Land: 1.15 sq mi (2.98 km^{2})
  - Water: 0.0077 sq mi (0.02 km^{2})
- Elevation: 1,266 ft (386 m)

Population (2020)
  - Total: 1,735
  - Density: 1,506.5/sq mi (581.67/km^{2})
- Time zone: UTC-5 (Eastern (EST))
  - Summer (DST): UTC-4 (EDT)
- Zip code: 17724
- Area code: 570
- FIPS code: 42-11160
- Website: https://www.cantonboroughpa.gov/

Canton is a borough in Bradford County, Pennsylvania, United States. It is part of Northeastern Pennsylvania. The population was 1,723 at the 2020 census.

== Geography ==
Canton is located in southwestern Bradford County at 41°39′21″N 76°51′3″W (41.655805, -76.850706), in the valley of Towanda Creek. It is surrounded by Canton Township but is a separate municipality.

Pennsylvania Route 14 passes through the borough, leading north 10 miles (16 km) to U.S. Route 6 in Troy and south 25 miles (40 km) to U.S. Route 15 at Trout Run. Pennsylvania Route 414 leaves east from the center of Canton, leading 21 miles (34 km) to U.S. Route 220 at Monroeton, and follows PA-14 to the southwest out of town, then leading 17 miles (27 km) to US-15 at Liberty.

According to the U.S. Census Bureau, Canton has a total area of 1.2 square miles (3.0 km^{2}), of which 0.004 square miles (0.01 km^{2}), or 0.45%, is water.

=== Climate ===
Climate data for Canton, Pennsylvania (1991–2020 normals, extremes 1976–present)
Month	Jan	Feb	Mar	Apr	May	Jun	Jul	Aug	Sep	Oct	Nov	Dec	Year
Record high °F (°C)	65 (18)	70 (21)	86 (30)	91 (33)	94 (34)	94 (34)	102 (39)	98 (37)	96 (36)	87 (31)	81 (27)	68 (20)	102 (39)
Mean daily maximum °F (°C)	32.8 (0.4)	35.7 (2.1)	44.1 (6.7)	57.5 (14.2)	68.9 (20.5)	76.5 (24.7)	80.9 (27.2)	79.2 (26.2)	72.0 (22.2)	60.4 (15.8)	48.3 (9.1)	37.7 (3.2)	57.8 (14.3)
Daily mean °F (°C)	23.8 (−4.6)	25.8 (−3.4)	33.6 (0.9)	45.4 (7.4)	56.2 (13.4)	64.6 (18.1)	68.9 (20.5)	67.4 (19.7)	60.0 (15.6)	48.8 (9.3)	38.6 (3.7)	29.6 (−1.3)	46.9 (8.3)
Mean daily minimum °F (°C)	14.9 (−9.5)	15.9 (−8.9)	23.1 (−4.9)	33.3 (0.7)	43.5 (6.4)	52.6 (11.4)	57.0 (13.9)	55.5 (13.1)	48.1 (8.9)	37.3 (2.9)	28.9 (−1.7)	21.5 (−5.8)	36.0 (2.2)
Record low °F (°C)	−24 (−31)	−21 (−29)	−16 (−27)	10 (−12)	22 (−6)	28 (−2)	37 (3)	28 (−2)	23 (−5)	13 (−11)	2 (−17)	−18 (−28)	−24 (−31)
Average precipitation inches (mm)	2.87 (73)	2.12 (54)	3.30 (84)	3.63 (92)	3.58 (91)	3.76 (96)	3.83 (97)	3.87 (98)	4.34 (110)	3.83 (97)	2.97 (75)	3.09 (78)	41.19 (1,046)
Average snowfall inches (cm)	10.1 (26)	9.9 (25)	8.8 (22)	1.5 (3.8)	0.0 (0.0)	0.0 (0.0)	0.0 (0.0)	0.0 (0.0)	0.0 (0.0)	0.2 (0.51)	2.8 (7.1)	8.8 (22)	42.1 (107)
Average precipitation days (≥ 0.01 in)	13.5	10.6	11.8	12.8	13.8	13.2	11.6	11.3	10.5	11.9	11.4	12.7	145.1
Average snowy days (≥ 0.1 in)	7.7	6.3	3.9	1.2	0.0	0.0	0.0	0.0	0.0	0.2	2.3	5.5	27.1
Source: NOAA

== Demographics ==
Historical population
Census	Pop.	Note	%±
1870	710		—
1880	1,194		68.2%
1890	1,393		16.7%
1900	1,525		9.5%
1910	1,637		7.3%
1920	2,154		31.6%
1930	1,904		−11.6%
1940	2,040		7.1%
1950	2,118		3.8%
1960	2,102		−0.8%
1970	2,037		−3.1%
1980	1,959		−3.8%
1990	1,966		0.4%
2000	1,807		−8.1%
2010	1,976		9.4%
2020	1,735		−12.2%
2021 (est.)	1,720	▼	−0.9%

As of the census of 2000, there were 1,807 people, 758 households, and 475 families residing in the borough. The population density was 1,580.1 people per square mile (610.1 people/km^{2}). There were 824 housing units at an average density of 720.5 per square mile (278.2/km^{2}). The racial makeup of the borough was 98.67% White, 0.33% African American, 0.11% Native American, 0.06% Asian, 0.06% from other races, and 0.77% from two or more races. Hispanic or Latino of any race were 0.33% of the population.

There were 758 households, out of which 31.4% had children under the age of 18 living with them, 45.3% were married couples living together, 13.6% had a female householder with no husband present, and 37.3% were non-families. 34.6% of all households were made up of individuals, and 18.7% had someone living alone who was 65 years of age or older. The average household size was 2.36 and the average family size was 3.01.

In the borough the population was spread out, with 27.4% under the age of 18, 7.5% from 18 to 24, 26.5% from 25 to 44, 20.1% from 45 to 64, and 18.5% who were 65 years of age or older. The median age was 36 years. For every 100 females there were 87.1 males. For every 100 females age 18 and over, there were 79.1 males.

The median income for a household in the borough was $26,848, and the median income for a family was $37,645. Males had a median income of $29,071 versus $23,804 for females. The per capita income for the borough was $13,537. About 13.7% of families and 15.6% of the population were below the poverty line, including 17.0% of those under age 18 and 6.3% of those age 65 or over.

== Notable people ==
- John H. Brown Jr. (1891–1963), decorated Vice admiral in the U.S. Navy
- Harry Davenport (1866–1949), famous film and stage actor with an acting career of over 76 years, regularly spent summers in Canton with his family. He played supporting roles in many film classics of the 1930s and 1940s and is perhaps best known as Dr. Meade in Gone with the Wind. His father was the well-known classical actor Edward Loomis Davenport (1815-1877), who died in Canton in September of 1877.
- Mial Eben Lilley (1850–1915), Republican member of the U.S. House of Representatives
- Frank Mayo (stage actor) (1839-1896), had a summer home in Canton. It was called "Crocket Lodge" - after his famous character, the frontiersman Davy Crockett.
- Joseph L. Townsend (1849–1942), writer of many Latter-day Saint hymns
- Marie Townsend (1851–1912) author and composer
- J. Lilian Vandevere (1885–1957) author, composer, and music educator
- Hollis Dann (1861–1939) American music educator and choral director
