= Troy Township, Bradford County, Pennsylvania =

Township in Pennsylvania, US

Coordinates: 41°44′44″N 76°45′59″W

- Township
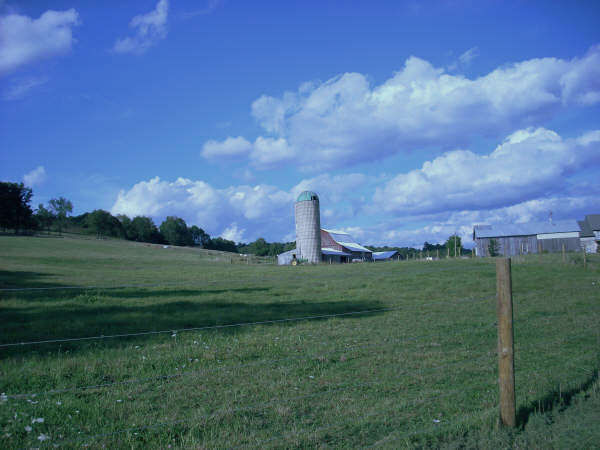
- A Troy Township farm

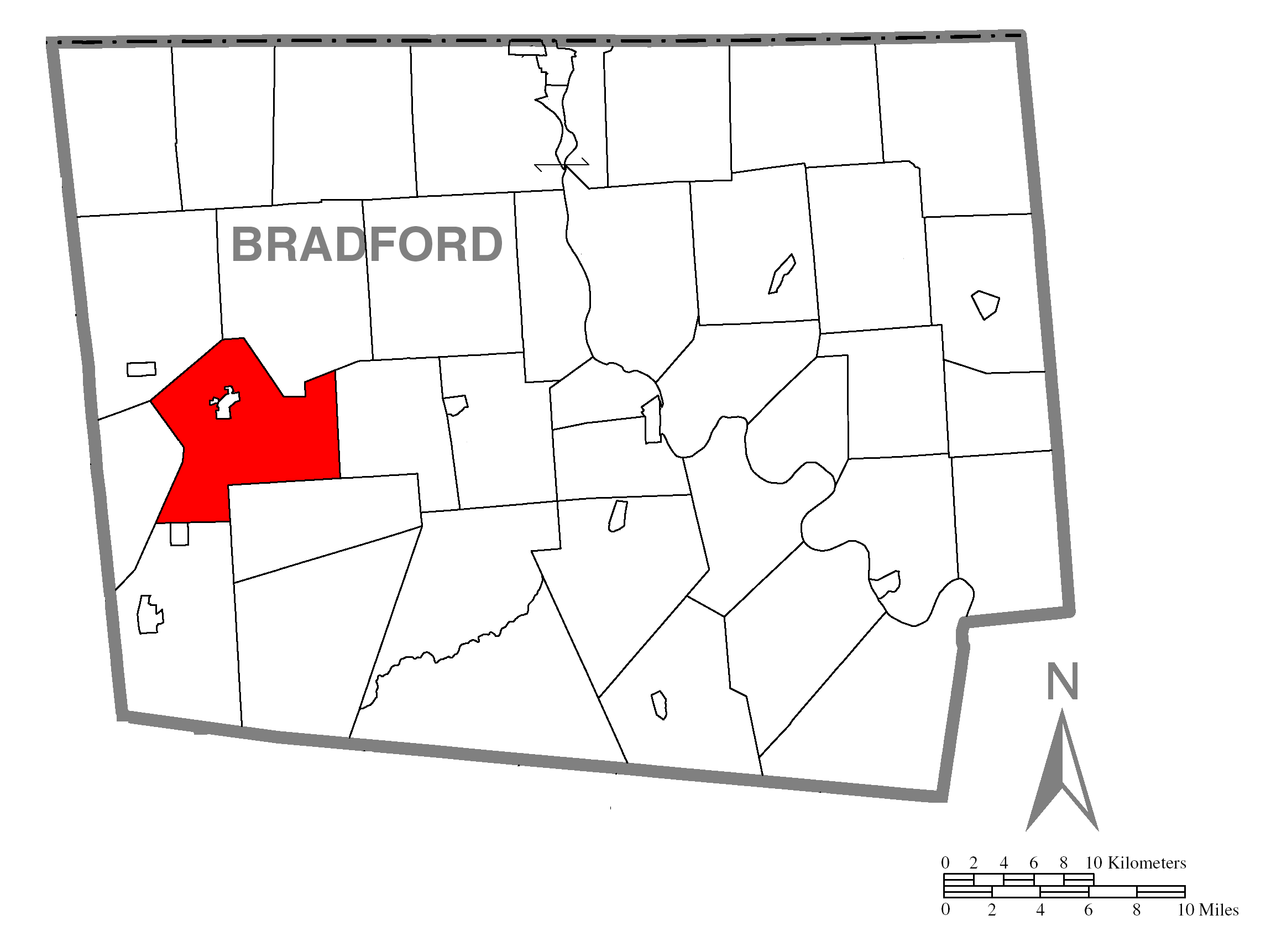
- Map of Bradford County with Troy Township highlighted

- Map of Bradford County, Pennsylvania
- Country: United States
- State: Pennsylvania
- County: Bradford
- Settled: 1793
- Incorporated: 1815

Area
  - Total: 36.19 sq mi (93.73 km^{2})
  - Land: 36.04 sq mi (93.35 km^{2})
  - Water: 0.15 sq mi (0.38 km^{2})

Population (2010)
  - Total: 1,645
  - Estimate (2016): 1,638
  - Density: 45.5/sq mi (17.55/km^{2})
- Area code: 570
- FIPS code: 42-015-77592

Troy Township is a township in Bradford County, Pennsylvania. It is part of Northeastern Pennsylvania. The population was 1,645 at the 2010 census. The town's children are assigned to attend the Troy Area School District.

== Geography ==
Troy Township is located in western Bradford County and is bordered by Springfield Township to the northeast, West Burlington Township to the east, Granville Township to the south and east, Canton Township to the south, Armenia Township to the west and Columbia Township to the northwest. Troy Township surrounds the borough of Troy but is separate from it. The unincorporated community of East Troy is located in the eastern part of the township.

U.S. Route 6 runs east–west through the township and Troy borough, following the valley of Sugar Creek east of Troy borough. Pennsylvania Route 14 runs north–south through the township, crossing US 6 in Troy borough.

According to the United States Census Bureau, the township has a total area of 36.2 square miles (93.7 km^{2}), of which 36.0 square miles (93.3 km^{2}) is land and 0.15 square miles (0.4 km^{2}), or 0.40%, is water.

== Demographics ==
Historical population
Census	Pop.	Note	%±
2010	1,645		—
2016 (est.)	1,638		−0.4%
U.S. Decennial Census

As of the census of 2000, there were 1,645 people, 651 households, and 471 families residing in the township. The population density was 45.0 inhabitants per square mile (17.4/km^{2}). There were 702 housing units at an average density of 19.2/sq mi (7.4/km^{2}). The racial makeup of the township was 98.97% White, 0.24% African American, 0.18% Native American, 0.06% Asian, 0.06% Pacific Islander, 0.30% from other races, and 0.18% from two or more races. Hispanic or Latino of any race were 0.49% of the population.

There were 651 households, out of which 31.6% had children under the age of 18 living with them, 59.4% were married couples living together, 8.4% had a female householder with no husband present, and 27.6% were non-families. 22.1% of all households were made up of individuals, and 10.8% had someone living alone who was 65 years of age or older. The average household size was 2.53 and the average family size was 2.93.

In the township the population was spread out, with 24.1% under the age of 18, 7.4% from 18 to 24, 25.8% from 25 to 44, 27.1% from 45 to 64, and 15.6% who were 65 years of age or older. The median age was 41 years. For every 100 females, there were 97.2 males. For every 100 females age 18 and over, there were 95.2 males.

The median income for a household in the township was $36,133, and the median income for a family was $43,233. Males had a median income of $27,113 versus $21,328 for females. The per capita income for the township was $17,076. About 8.4% of families and 12.2% of the population were below the poverty line, including 19.0% of those under age 18 and 8.0% of those age 65 or over.
