= Liberty, Tioga County, Pennsylvania =

Borough in Pennsylvania, US

Liberty, Pennsylvania
- Borough
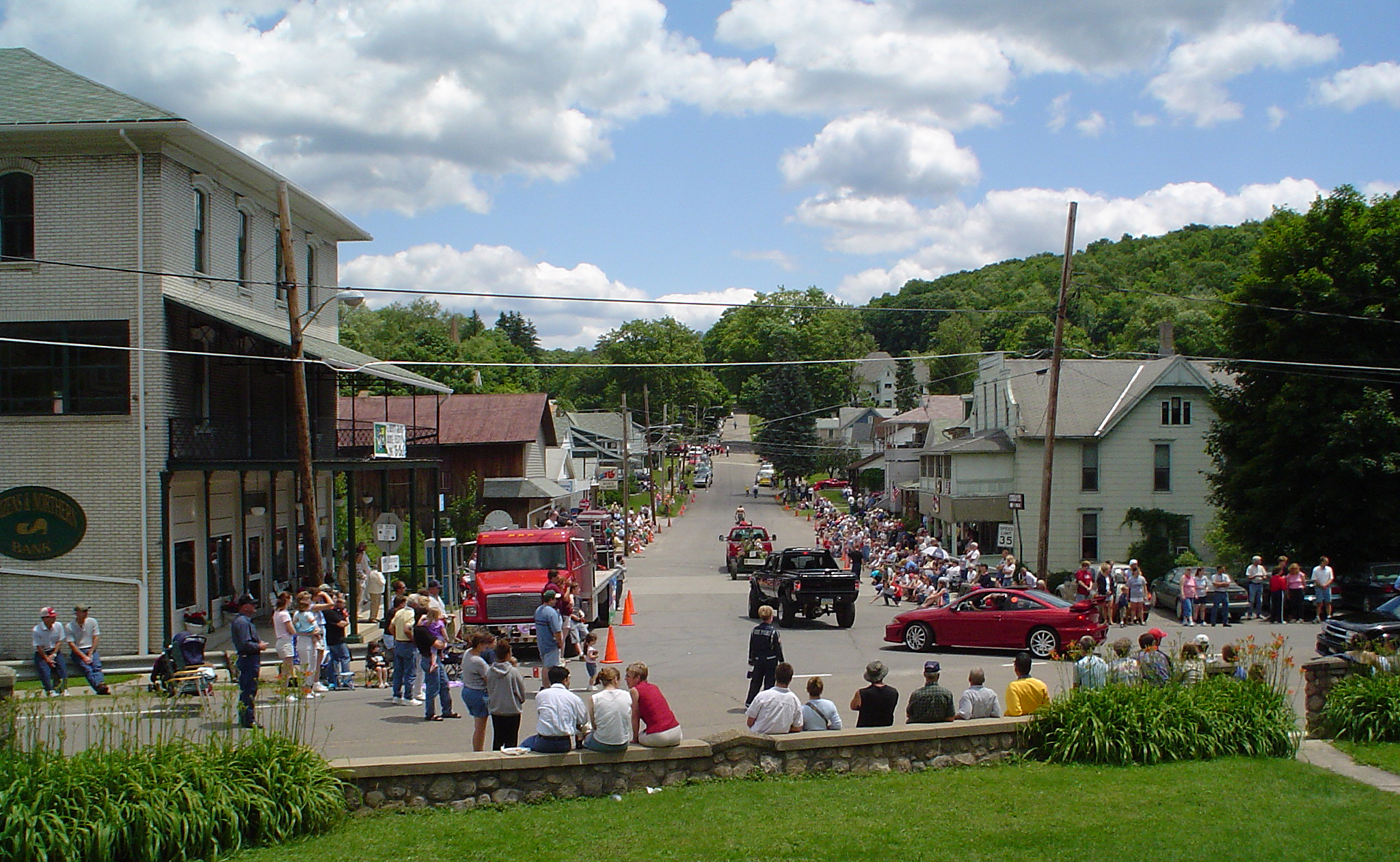
- Downtown Liberty, Pennsylvania, circa mid-2000s, during the annual Blockhouse Festival Parade

- Location of Liberty in Tioga County, Pennsylvania.

- Location within the state of Pennsylvania Liberty (the United States)
- Coordinates: 41°33′30″N 77°06′17″W
- Country: United States
- State: Pennsylvania
- County: Tioga
- Settled: 1792
- Incorporated (borough): 1893

Area
  - Total: 0.47 sq mi (1.23 km^{2})
  - Land: 0.47 sq mi (1.23 km^{2})
  - Water: 0 sq mi (0.00 km^{2})
- Elevation: 1,598 ft (487 m)

Population (2020)
  - Total: 234
  - Density: 491.2/sq mi (189.65/km^{2})
- Time zone: Eastern (EST)
  - Summer (DST): EDT
- ZIP code: 16930
- Area code: 570
- FIPS code: 42-43128
- GNIS feature ID: 1215624

Liberty is a small borough in Tioga County, Pennsylvania, United States. The population was 232 at the time of the 2020 census.

== Geography ==
Liberty is located at 41°33′30″N 77°6′14″W (41.558446, -77.103839).

According to the United States Census Bureau, the borough has a total area of 0.5 square mile (1.3 km^{2}), all of it land.

== Demographics ==
Historical population
Census	Pop.	Note	%±
1900	263		—
1910	253		−3.8%
1920	194		−23.3%
1930	221		13.9%
1940	280		26.7%
1950	271		−3.2%
1960	269		−0.7%
1970	235		−12.6%
1980	220		−6.4%
1990	199		−9.5%
2000	230		15.6%
2010	249		8.3%
2020	232		−6.8%
2021 (est.)	231		−0.4%

As of the census of 2010, there were 249 people, 93 households, and 85 families residing in the borough.

The population density was 446.5 inhabitants per square mile (172.4/km^{2}). There were ninety-five housing units at an average density of 184.4 per square mile (71.2/km^{2}).

The racial makeup of the borough was 99.13% White, and 0.87% from two or more races. Hispanic or Latino of any race were 0.87% of the population.

There were eighty-eight households, out of which 42.0% had children under the age of eighteen living with them; 56.8% were married couples living together, 10.2% had a female householder with no husband present, and 30.7% were non-families. 27.3% of all households were made up of individuals, and 9.1% had someone living alone who was sixty-five years of age or older.

The average household size was 2.61 and the average family size was 3.13.

In the borough the population was spread out, with 31.3% under the age of eighteen, 9.6% from eighteen to twenty-four, 28.7% from twenty-five to forty-four 18.7% from forty-five to sixty-four, and 11.7% who were sixty-five years of age or older. The median age was thirty-two years.

For every one hundred females there were 101.8 males. For every one hundred females who were aged eighteen and over, there were 97.5 males.

The median income for a household in the borough was $39,219, and the median income for a family was $38,542. Males had a median income of $27,813 compared with that of $19,688 for females.

The per capita income for the borough was $17,690.

Roughly 4.9% of families and 9.8% of the population were living below the poverty line, including 13.6% of those who were under the age of eighteen. None who were aged sixty-five or older were living in poverty.

== Education ==
It is in the Southern Tioga School District.

== Notable people ==
- Jimmy Sebring, first baseball player to hit a World Series home run, was born in Liberty.
