= Pennsylvania House of Representatives, District 68 =

American legislative district

Pennsylvania's 68th State House of Representatives district
Representative
Clinton D. Owlett; R–Morris
- Population (2022): 63,772

The 68th Pennsylvania House of Representatives District is located in northern Pennsylvania, and has been represented by Clinton D. Owlett since 2018.

== District profile ==
The 68th District encompasses all of Tioga County, and includes the following parts of Bradford County:

- Alba
- Armenia Township
- Burlington
- Burlington Township
- Canton
- Canton Township
- Columbia Township
- Franklin Township
- Granville Township
- Leroy Township
- Monroe
- Monroe Township
- North Towanda
- Overton Township
- Ridgebury Township
- Smithfield Township
- South Creek Township
- Springfield Township
- Sylvania
- Towanda Township
- Troy
- Troy Township
- Wells Township
- West Burlington Township

== Representatives ==
Representative	Party	Years	District home	Note
Prior to 1969, seats were apportioned by county.
Warren H. Spencer	Republican	1969 – 1984		
Edgar A. Carlson	Republican	1985 – 1992		
Matt E. Baker	Republican	1993 – 2018	Wellsboro	Resigned on February 18, 2018 to become Regional Director of the U.S. Health and Human Services Office of Intergovernmental and External Affairs
Clint Owlett	Republican	2018 – present	Morris	Incumbent

== Recent election results ==
PA House election, 2024: Pennsylvania House, District 68
Party	Candidate	Votes	%
Republican	Clint Owlett (incumbent)	Unopposed	
Total votes		29,716	100.00
Republican hold			

PA House election, 2022: Pennsylvania House, District 68
Party	Candidate	Votes	%
Republican	Clint Owlett (incumbent)	Unopposed	
Total votes		22,628	100.00
Republican hold			

PA House election, 2020: Pennsylvania House, District 68
Party	Candidate	Votes	%
Republican	Clint Owlett (incumbent)	26,055	89.11
Libertarian	Noyes Lawton	3,183	10.89
Total votes		29,238	100.00
Republican hold			

PA House election, 2018: Pennsylvania House, District 68
Party	Candidate	Votes	%
Republican	Clint Owlett (incumbent)	16,109	76.92
Democratic	Carrie Heath	4,834	23.08
Total votes		20,943	100.00
Republican hold			

PA House special election, 2018: Pennsylvania House, District 68
Party	Candidate	Votes	%
Republican	Clint Owlett	7,840	75.87
Democratic	Carrie Heath	2,493	24.13
Total votes		10,333	100.00
Republican hold			

PA House election, 2016: Pennsylvania House, District 68
Party	Candidate	Votes	%
Republican	Matt Baker (incumbent)	Unopposed	
Total votes		24,920	100.00
Republican hold			
