= James H. Webb (Pennsylvania politician) =

American politician (1820–1896)

50th Speaker of the Pennsylvania House of Representatives
- In office January 1, 1871 – January 1, 1872
- Preceded by: Butler B. Strang
- Succeeded by: William Elliott

Member of the Pennsylvania House of Representatives
- In office January 1, 1874 – January 1, 1875 Serving with Elijah Reed Myer
- Preceded by: Elijah Reed Myer & Benjamin S. Dartt
- Succeeded by: George Moscrip, Uriah Terry, & Elijah G. Tracy
- Constituency: Bradford County district
- In office January 1, 1867 – January 1, 1872 Serving with George Wayne Kinney (1867), John F. Chamberlain (1868, 1869, 1870), & Perley Hanford Buck (1871)
- Preceded by: Lorenzo Grinnell & George Wayne Kinney
- Succeeded by: Perley Hanford Buck & Benjamin S. Dartt
- Constituency: Bradford–Sullivan district

Register of Wills and Recorder of Deeds of Bradford County, Pennsylvania
- In office December 1, 1881 – December 1, 1884
- Preceded by: Addison C. Frisbie
- Succeeded by: Adelbert D. Munn
- In office December 1, 1854 – December 1, 1860
- Preceded by: H. Lawrence Scott
- Succeeded by: Nathan C. Elsbree

Personal details
- Born: December 4, 1820 Tioga County, New York, U.S.
- Died: February 21, 1896 (aged 75) Smithfield Township, Bradford County, Pennsylvania, U.S.
- Resting place: Union Cemetery, Smithfield Township
- Party: Republican; Democratic (before 1855)
- Spouses: Sally M. Chamberlain (m. 1845; died 1879); Mary Munson (m. 1882–1896)
- Children: George Howard Webb^{(b. 1849; died 1928)}; Charles Greenleaf Webb^{(b. 1852; died 1915)}; Edwin Ruthvane Webb^{(b. 1856; died 1926)}; William Henry Webb^{(b. 1863)}; Margaret Webb (adopted)^{(b. 1865)}; Edwin Beckwith Webb
- Relatives: William C. Webb (brother); Henry G. Webb (brother); Charles M. Webb (brother); Leland Justin Webb (nephew)
- Occupation: Farmer

James Hammond Webb (December 4, 1820 – February 21, 1896) was an American farmer and Republican politician from Bradford County, Pennsylvania. He represented Bradford County for six terms in the Pennsylvania House of Representatives, and served as the 50th speaker of the Pennsylvania House of Representatives (1871).

His father, John Leland Webb, was also a member of the Pennsylvania House of Representatives. His younger brothers, William C. Webb, Henry G. Webb, and Charles M. Webb, all became prominent politicians in their own adopted states.

== Biography ==
James H. Webb was born December 4, 1820, in Tioga County, New York, in the portion of the county which is now Chemung County, New York. As a child, he moved with his family to Ridgebury Township, Pennsylvania, where he was raised and educated. He worked on his father's farm in Smithfield Township, and took over the management of the farm after his father's death in 1846. He moved his primary residence to the Smithfield farm in 1850.

Webb first became active in local politics with the Democratic Party. He was elected Register and Recorder of Bradford County in 1854, running on the Democratic Party ticket. But within a year he had switched his affiliation to the newly established Republican Party. He was re-elected in 1857, running on the Republican Party ticket.

He was active for most of the next 20 years campaigning and organizing on behalf of the Republican Party and its wartime identity, the National Union Party. He next stood for office in 1866, when he won his first term in the Pennsylvania House of Representatives. He went on to win four more terms, serving continuously through the end of 1871. At the organization of the 1871 Pennsylvania Legislature, Webb was elected speaker of the Pennsylvania House of Representatives. He did not run again in 1871, but returned and won a final term in the House in the 1873 election.

He ran for his final office in 1881, when he was elected to his third and final term as register and recorder of Bradford County.

During this final term in elected office, Webb began reading law and, in 1885, was admitted to practice law, but was only able to practice for a few years. His health began to decline and he suffered from a creeping paralysis.

He died at his home in Smithfield township on February 21, 1896.

== Personal life and family ==
James H. Webb was the eldest of seven children born to John Leland Webb and his wife Annis (née Hammond). John Leland Webb was a prominent business contractor and politician in Pennsylvania; he was a contractor for the construction of the North Branch Canal and later served as a sheriff and member of the Pennsylvania House of Representatives. The Webb family descended from the colonist Richard Webb, who came to Connecticut Colony from England in 1626.

James Webb's three younger brothers also went on to prominent careers:

- William Craw Webb was the first Kansas Insurance Commissioner, and also served in the Kansas House of Representatives and the Wisconsin State Assembly.
- Henry Greenleaf Webb was a member of the Wisconsin Senate, Wisconsin State Assembly, and Kansas House of Representatives, and served as a Kansas district court judge.
- Charles Morton Webb was a Wisconsin state senator, Wisconsin circuit court judge, and United States attorney.

James H. Webb married twice. He married Sally M. Chamberlain on September 20, 1845. They had five children together, though one died young. After his first wife's death in 1879, he remarried with Mary Munson, the widow of Joseph Munson. They adopted another daughter, Margaret.

Pennsylvania House of Representatives
| Preceded by Lorenzo Grinnell & George Wayne Kinney | Member of the Pennsylvania House of Representatives from the Bradford–Sullivan district January 1, 1867 – January 1, 1872; Served alongside: George Wayne Kinney (1867), John F. Chamberlain (1868, 1869, 1870), & Perley Hanford Buck (1871) | Succeeded by Perley Hanford Buck & Benjamin S. Dartt |
| Preceded by Elijah Reed Myer & Benjamin S. Dartt | Member of the Pennsylvania House of Representatives from the Bradford County district January 1, 1874 – January 1, 1875; Served alongside: Elijah Reed Myer | Succeeded by George Moscrip, Uriah Terry, & Elijah G. Tracy |
| Preceded by Butler B. Strang | Speaker of the Pennsylvania House of Representatives; January 1, 1871 – January 1, 1872 | Succeeded by William Elliott |
Political offices
| Preceded by H. Lawrence Scott | Register of Wills and Recorder of Deeds of Bradford County, Pennsylvania; December 1, 1854 – December 1, 1860 | Succeeded by Nathan C. Elsbree |
| Preceded by Addison C. Frisbie | Register of Wills and Recorder of Deeds of Bradford County, Pennsylvania; December 1, 1881 – December 1, 1884 | Succeeded by Adelbert D. Munn |
