= Henry G. Webb =

American politician (1826–1910)

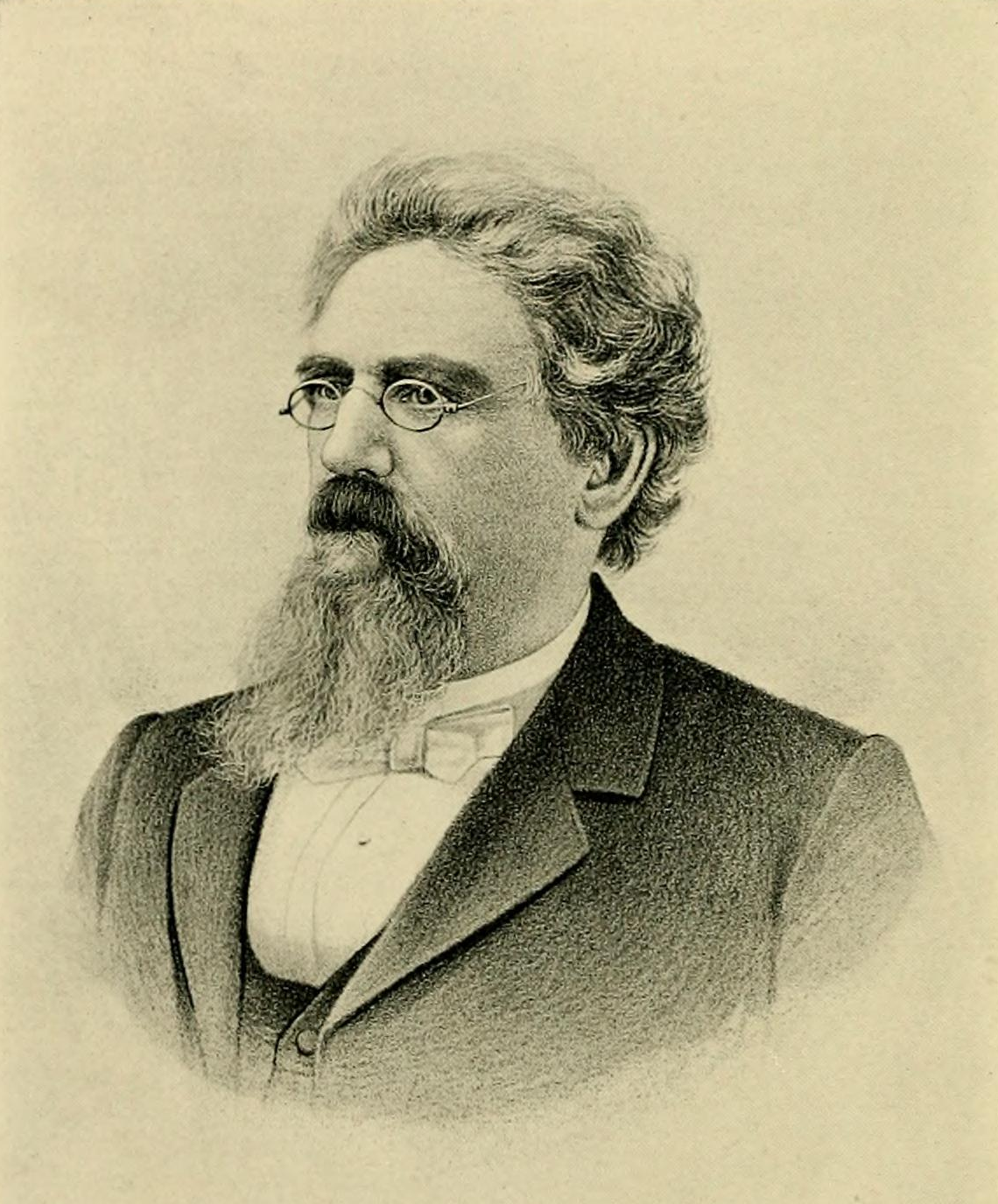
- From History of Labette County, Kansas (1901)

Member of the Kansas House of Representatives from the 44th district
- In office January 1, 1876 – January 1, 1877
- Preceded by: R. W. Wright
- Succeeded by: George W. Gabriel

Kansas District Court Judge for the 11th district
- In office January 1, 1871 – February 1873
- Preceded by: William C. Webb
- Succeeded by: Bishop W. Perkins

Member of the Wisconsin Senate
- In office January 7, 1867 – January 4, 1869
- Preceded by: G. DeWitt Elwood
- Succeeded by: George D. Waring
- Constituency: 29th Senate district
- In office January 2, 1865 – January 7, 1867
- Preceded by: Alanson M. Kimball
- Succeeded by: DeWitt C. Wilson
- Constituency: 9th Senate district

Member of the Wisconsin State Assembly from the Waushara County district
- In office January 7, 1861 – January 6, 1862
- Preceded by: Jacob S. Bugh
- Succeeded by: William C. Webb

Personal details
- Born: January 24, 1826 Ridgebury Township, Bradford County, Pennsylvania, U.S.
- Died: August 28, 1910 (aged 84) Yellville, Arkansas, U.S.
- Resting place: Yellville Cemetery
- Party: Populist (1890s); Republican (1860–1890s); Democratic (before 1860); Know Nothing (1855)
- Spouses: Susan J. Abbott (m. 1849; died 1864); Amanda J. Gower (m. 1866)
- Children: Alice Ann Webb^{(b. 1850; died 1854)}; Emma Eva (Wenzel)^{(b. 1853; died 1907)}
- Parents: John Leland Webb (father); Annis (Hammond) Webb (mother)
- Relatives: James H. Webb (brother); William C. Webb (brother); Charles M. Webb (brother); Leland Justin Webb (nephew)
- Profession: Lawyer

Military service
- Allegiance: United States
- Branch/service: United States Volunteers (Union Army)
- Years of service: 1861–1862
- Rank: Captain, USV
- Unit: 16th Reg. Wis. Vol. Infantry
- Battles/wars: American Civil War

Henry Greenleaf Webb (January 24, 1826 – August 28, 1910) was an American lawyer, politician, and pioneer of Wisconsin and Kansas. He was a member of the Wisconsin Senate, Wisconsin State Assembly, and Kansas House of Representatives. He also served as a Kansas district court judge. For most of his career he was affiliated with the Republican Party, but at various times ran as a Democrat or Populist. In historical documents his name was often abbreviated as H. G. Webb.

His brothers, James H. Webb, William C. Webb, and Charles M. Webb, were also prominent lawyers and politicians. Their father, John Leland Webb, was a politician in Pennsylvania.

== Early life ==
Henry G. Webb was born January 24, 1826, in Ridgebury Township, Bradford County, Pennsylvania. He had limited formal education because of the lack of schools established in his native county. As a young man he went to study law under judge John C. Knox and was admitted to the bar at Wellsboro, Pennsylvania, in September 1848.

== Wisconsin career ==
He moved west to the new state of Wisconsin in 1849, and settled at Princeton, in what is now Green Lake County, Wisconsin. At the time, this area was still part of Marquette County. The first known American settlement at Princeton was only a year earlier, and the post office was established in the same year that Webb arrived. Webb was the first practicing lawyer in the village.

Webb first ran for state office in 1855, running for Wisconsin State Assembly in the Marquette County district. At this time, Webb was affiliated with the Democratic Party and ran on the Democratic ticket. He lost the general election to Republican William F. Chipman. The following year, Webb was selected for the Democratic Party slate of presidential electors for the 1856 United States presidential election. His candidate, James Buchanan, won the presidency, but the Republican electoral slate was chosen in Wisconsin. During the election, it also became known that Webb had been active with the anti-immigrant Know Nothings.

Shortly after the election, Webb moved to Wautoma, Wisconsin, where his brother William had settled, and began affiliating with the Republican Party. In the 1860 election, Webb was the Republican nominee for Wisconsin State Assembly in the Waushara County district. He defeated the independent Republican candidate Alvah Nash and went on to serve in the 1861 legislative session.

After the outbreak of the American Civil War during the 1861 session, Webb began working to raise a company of volunteers for the Union Army. His company was known as the "Tredway Pumas"; they were enrolled as Company H in the 16th Wisconsin Infantry Regiment and Webb was commissioned captain. Webb participated in the organization of the regiment, but ultimately resigned before the regiment left the state.

Webb remained active in Wisconsin with Union organizing, and in 1864, he ran for Wisconsin Senate on the National Union ticket. He was elected to represent the 9th Senate district, which then comprised Adams, Juneau, and Waushara counties. During the 1866 legislative session, redistricting occurred and Webb ran for re-election that year in the new 29th Senate district, which then comprised Green Lake, Marquette, and Waushara counties. He prevailed again in the 1866 general election and went on to serve two more years in the Senate.

Shortly after the end of the 1868 legislative session, Webb moved to Kansas along with his brother, William, and their families.

== Kansas career ==
Webb initially settled in Mound City, Kansas, but relocated to Oswego, Kansas, in the spring of 1870. That fall, he was elected a Kansas district court judge in the newly established 11th district. Prior to his election, his brother William served as judge by gubernatorial appointment. He did not complete his term however, resigning in February 1873, to focus on his legal career. Two years later, he was elected to the Kansas House of Representatives, serving in the 1876 session.

He largely focused on his legal career for the rest of his life. He relocated to Cherokee County, Kansas, in the 1880s, but returned to Labette County in 1889, settling at Parsons, where he served several years as city attorney.

In the 1890s, Webb was associated with the free silver movement and subsequently associated with the short-lived Populist Party. He ran twice for county attorney on the Populist ticket, but was not elected.

In 1903, he retired due to poor health and moved to Houston, Texas, believing the warmer climate would be beneficial to his constitution. During a 1906 visit to friends in Yellville, Arkansas, he felt such improvement in his health that he decided to permanently relocate there. He died at his home in Yellville on the morning of August 28, 1910.

== Personal life and family ==
Henry G. Webb was the fourth of seven children born to John Leland Webb and his wife Annis (née Hammond). John Leland Webb was a prominent business contractor and politician in Pennsylvania; he was a contractor for the construction of the North Branch Canal and later served as a sheriff and member of the Pennsylvania House of Representatives. The Webb family descended from the colonist Richard Webb, who came to Connecticut Colony from England in 1626.

Henry's eldest brother, James H. Webb was a successful politician in Pennsylvania and served as the 50th speaker of the Pennsylvania House of Representatives. His next eldest brother William C. Webb and their younger brother Charles M. Webb were also trained as lawyers and rose to prominence in Wisconsin. William Webb later moved to Kansas where he was also prominent in state politics. William was the first Kansas Insurance Commissioner, served as Henry Webb's predecessor by appointment as a Kansas district court judge, and served in the Kansas and Wisconsin legislatures. Charles Webb served as a Wisconsin state senator, Wisconsin circuit court judge, and United States attorney.

Henry G. Webb married twice. He married Susan J. Abbott of Lorain County, Ohio, on May 20, 1849. They had two daughters together, though one died in childhood. Susan died on September 3, 1864. In April 1866, Webb remarried with Amanda Jean Gower of Pennsylvania, but there were no known children of the second marriage.

Webb was active for most of his life in Freemasonry in lodges in Wisconsin and Kansas. He was also a member of the Knights Templar and the Independent Order of Odd Fellows.

Wisconsin State Assembly
| Preceded by Jacob S. Bugh | Member of the Wisconsin State Assembly from the Waushara County district January 7, 1861 – January 6, 1862 | Succeeded by William C. Webb |
Wisconsin Senate
| Preceded by Alanson M. Kimball | Member of the Wisconsin Senate from the 9th district January 2, 1865 – January 7, 1867 | Succeeded by DeWitt C. Wilson |
| Preceded by G. DeWitt Elwood | Member of the Wisconsin Senate from the 29th district January 7, 1867 – January 4, 1869 | Succeeded by George D. Waring |
Kansas House of Representatives
| Preceded by R. W. Wright | Member of the Kansas House of Representatives from the 44th district January 1, 1876 – January 1, 1877 | Succeeded by George W. Gabriel |
Legal offices
| Preceded by William C. Webb | Kansas District Court Judge for the 11th district January 1, 1871 – February 1873 | Succeeded by Bishop W. Perkins |
