= John Leland Webb =

19th century American politician

John L. Webb

Member of the Pennsylvania House of Representatives from the Bradford County district
- In office January 1, 1846 – October 17, 1846 (died) Serving with Victor Emile Piollet
- Preceded by: John Elliott
- Succeeded by: Francis Smith

Sheriff of Bradford County, Pennsylvania
- In office December 1833 – November 1836
- Preceded by: Lockwood Smith Jr.
- Succeeded by: Guy Tozer

Personal details
- Born: February 25, 1794 Norwalk, Connecticut, U.S.
- Died: October 17, 1846 (aged 52) Smithfield Township, Bradford County, Pennsylvania, U.S.
- Resting place: Union Cemetery, Smithfield Township
- Party: Democratic
- Spouse: Annis Hammond (m. 1819–1846)
- Children: James Hammond Webb^{(b. 1820; died 1896)}; Polly Street (Vincent)^{(b. 1822; died 1883)}; William Craw Webb^{(b. 1824; died 1898)}; Henry Greenleaf Webb^{(b. 1826; died 1910)}; John Leland Webb Jr.^{(b. 1828; died 1830)}; John Bast Webb^{(b. 1830; died 1834)}; Charles Morton Webb^{(b. 1833; died 1911)}
- Relatives: Leland Justin Webb (grandson)
- Occupation: Contractor

John Leland Webb (February 25, 1794 – October 17, 1846) was an American contractor and Democratic politician in Bradford County, Pennsylvania. He was a member of the Pennsylvania House of Representatives during the 1846 session and died in office. He previously served as sheriff of Bradford County.

Four of Webb's sons became prominent politicians: James in Pennsylvania, William and Henry in Wisconsin and Kansas, and Charles in Wisconsin.

== Biography ==
John Leland Webb was born February 25, 1794, in Norwalk, Connecticut, and was raised and educated in Fairfield County, Connecticut.

He moved to Chemung County, New York, in 1813, and went to work in construction. He then moved to Bradford County, Pennsylvania, in 1823, and initially settled at Ridgebury Township. There he went to work as a building contractor and was hired as one of the contractors for the construction of the North Branch Canal.

He soon became involved in local politics. He was the first justice of the peace at Ridgebury township, serving ten years while holding other offices. In 1827, he was elected coroner of Bradford County, and, in 1830, he was elected one of the three county commissioners. He was then elected sheriff of Bradford County, serving from December 1833 to November 1836.

In 1845, Webb was elected to the Pennsylvania House of Representatives from Bradford County, alongside Victor Emile Piollet, running together on the Democratic Party ticket. He was re-elected in 1846, but died suddenly four days after the election, on October 17, 1846, while he was home at his farm in Smithfield township.

== Personal life and family ==
John L. Webb was the sixth of seven children born to Moses Webb and his first wife Polly (née Street). Moses Webb was a veteran of the American Revolutionary War, having served in the Connecticut militia. The Webb family descended from the colonist Richard Webb, who came to Connecticut Colony from England in 1626.

John L. Webb married Annis Hammond of New London County, Connecticut, on September 23, 1819. They had seven children, though two sons died in childhood. All four of their surviving sons grew to have prominent political careers.

- James Hammond Webb served as the 50th speaker of the Pennsylvania House of Representatives and was register and recorder of Bradford County for three terms.
- William Craw Webb was the first Kansas Insurance Commissioner, and also served in the Kansas House of Representatives and the Wisconsin State Assembly.
- Henry Greenleaf Webb was a member of the Wisconsin Senate, Wisconsin State Assembly, and Kansas House of Representatives, and served as a Kansas district court judge.
- Charles Morton Webb was a Wisconsin state senator, Wisconsin circuit court judge, and United States attorney.

Pennsylvania House of Representatives
| Preceded by John Elliott | Member of the Pennsylvania House of Representatives from the Bradford County district January 1, 1846 – October 17, 1846 | Succeeded by Victor Emile Piollet |
Legal offices
| Preceded by George Wolf | Sheriff of Bradford County, Pennsylvania; December 1833 – November 1836 | Succeeded by Lockwood Smith Jr. |
