= William C. Webb =

American politician (1824–1898)

1st Kansas Superintendent of Insurance
- In office January 1, 1871 – January 1, 1873
- Preceded by: Position established
- Succeeded by: Edward Russell

Member of the Kansas House of Representatives from the 41st district
- In office January 1, 1891 – January 1, 1893
- Preceded by: George W. Veale
- Succeeded by: Richard D. McCliman
- In office January 1, 1870 – January 1, 1872
- Preceded by: John Guthrie
- Succeeded by: George W. Wood

Kansas District Court Judge for the 11th district
- In office March 16, 1870 – November 17, 1870
- Appointed by: James M. Harvey
- Preceded by: Position established
- Succeeded by: Henry G. Webb

Member of the Wisconsin State Assembly from the Waushara County district
- In office January 6, 1862 – January 2, 1865
- Preceded by: Henry G. Webb
- Succeeded by: Oscar Babcock
- In office January 4, 1858 – January 3, 1859
- Preceded by: George Hawley
- Succeeded by: Charles White

Personal details
- Born: William Craw Webb; April 21, 1824 Ridgebury, Pennsylvania
- Died: April 19, 1898 (aged 73) Topeka, Kansas
- Resting place: Topeka Cemetery, Topeka
- Party: Republican; National Union (1863–1865); Free Soil (before 1854)
- Spouses: Emily Emblem Abbott (m. 1845; died 1852); Mary Malvina Witter (m. 1855; died 1855)
- Children: Leland Justin Webb^{(b. 1846; died 1893)}; Sarah Annis "Sadie" (Walker)^{(b. 1848; died 1931)}; Linus Simmons Webb^{(b. 1850; died 1923)}; 1 other son; 1 other daughter
- Parents: John Leland Webb (father); Annis (Hammond) Webb (mother)
- Relatives: James H. Webb (brother); Henry G. Webb (brother); Charles M. Webb (brother)
- Profession: Lawyer

Military service
- Allegiance: United States
- Branch/service: United States Volunteers (Union Army)
- Years of service: 1864–1865
- Rank: Colonel, USV
- Unit: 37th Reg. Wis. Vol. Infantry
- Commands: 52nd Reg. Wis. Vol. Infantry
- Battles/wars: American Civil War

William Craw Webb (April 21, 1824 – April 19, 1898) was an American lawyer, Republican politician, and pioneer of Wisconsin and Kansas. He was the first Kansas Insurance Commissioner, served as a member of the Kansas House of Representatives and the Wisconsin State Assembly, and served as a Kansas district court judge. Earlier in life, he served as a Union Army officer in the American Civil War.

His brothers, James H. Webb, Henry G. Webb, and Charles M. Webb, were also prominent lawyers and politicians. Their father, John Leland Webb, was a politician in Pennsylvania.

== Biography ==
Webb was born in Ridgebury Township, Pennsylvania, on April 21, 1824, son of John L. and Annis (Hammond) Webb. Later, he was a resident of Wautoma, Wisconsin. He died on April 24, 1898, in Topeka, Kansas.

== Political career ==
Webb was Chief Clerk of the Wisconsin Assembly for the 1857 session, when his brother, Henry, was a member. In the fall general election that year, he was elected to succeed his brother as a member of the Assembly for the 1858 session. He was elected again to serve in the 1862, 1863 and 1864 sessions. He served a term as Speaker. Previously, he had been Chief Clerk of the Assembly in 1857. Webb was also District Attorney and Judge of Waushara County, Wisconsin.

In 1870, Webb was a Kansas District Court judge. From 1871 to 1873, he was the first Kansas State Superintendent of Insurance. Webb was a member of the House of Representatives from 1870 to 1871 before being re-elected in 1891. Additionally, he was Attorney and Superior Court Judge of Shawnee County, Kansas.

Webb's affiliation by the time he held office was with the Republican Party.

== Military career ==
Webb was initially assigned to the 37th Wisconsin Volunteer Infantry Regiment of the Union Army during the American Civil War. He was later commissioned Colonel of the 52nd Wisconsin Infantry Regiment, but was never mustered into federal service at that rank, because the regiment did not reach its full strength. He was a Companion of the Kansas Commandery of the Military Order of the Loyal Legion of the United States.

== Family ==
Webb's son Leland Justin Webb, was a lawyer and politician. His brothers, Henry and Charles were also active in politics and law in Wisconsin and Kansas.

Wisconsin State Assembly
| Preceded by George Hawley | Member of the Wisconsin State Assembly from the Waushara County district January 4, 1858 – January 3, 1859 | Succeeded by Charles White |
| Preceded by Henry G. Webb | Member of the Wisconsin State Assembly from the Waushara County district January 6, 1862 – January 2, 1865 | Succeeded by Oscar Babcock |
Kansas House of Representatives
| Preceded by John Guthrie | Member of the Kansas House of Representatives from the 41st district January 1, 1870 – January 1, 1872 | Succeeded by George W. Wood |
| Preceded by George W. Veale | Member of the Kansas House of Representatives from the 41st district January 1, 1891 – January 1, 1893 | Succeeded by Richard D. McCliman |
Political offices
| Office created | Kansas Superintendent of Insurance; January 1, 1871 – January 1, 1873 | Succeeded by Edward Russell |
Legal offices
| District created | Kansas District Court Judge for the 11th district March 16, 1870 – November 17, 1870 | Succeeded by Henry G. Webb |
