= South Creek =

South Creek may refer to:

- South Creek (New South Wales), a creek in Australia
- St Marys railway station, Sydney, in New South Wales, Australia, previously named South Creek
- South Creek Township, Pennsylvania, United States of America
- South Creek Township, South Dakota, United States of America
- An archaeological site in Ras Beirut, Lebanon
