= Charles M. Webb =

American lawyer, judge, and politician

Wisconsin Circuit Court Judge for the 7th Circuit
- In office 1883 – August 12, 1911
- Appointed by: Jeremiah McLain Rusk
- Preceded by: Gilbert L. Park
- Succeeded by: Byron B. Park

United States Attorney for the Western District of Wisconsin
- In office July 1870 – February 14, 1878
- President: Ulysses S. Grant; Rutherford B. Hayes
- Preceded by: John B. D. Cogswell; (District of Wisconsin)
- Succeeded by: H. M. Lewis

Member of the Wisconsin Senate
- In office January 1, 1883 – April 1883
- Preceded by: Thomas B. Scott
- Succeeded by: Merritt Clarke Ring
- Constituency: 11th Senate district
- In office January 1, 1869 – January 1, 1871
- Preceded by: E. L. Browne
- Succeeded by: Myron Reed
- Constituency: 27th Senate district

Mayor of Grand Rapids, Wisconsin
- In office 1880–1881

District Attorney of Wood County, Wisconsin
- In office January 1, 1859 – September 1861

Personal details
- Born: December 30, 1833 Towanda, Pennsylvania
- Died: August 12, 1911 (aged 77) Grand Rapids, Wisconsin
- Resting place: Forest Hill Cemetery; Wisconsin Rapids, Wisconsin
- Party: Republican
- Spouses: Prudence Jane Pierce; (m. 1857; died 1914)
- Children: Clara (Harvie)^{(b. 1865; died 1948)}; 2 other daughters
- Parents: John Leland Webb (father); Annis (Hammond) Webb (mother)
- Relatives: James H. Webb (brother); William C. Webb (brother); Henry G. Webb (brother); Leland Justin Webb (nephew)
- Occupation: Lawyer

Military service
- Allegiance: United States
- Branch/service: United States Volunteers (Union Army)
- Years of service: 1861–1862
- Rank: 1st Lieutenant, USV
- Unit: 12th Reg. Wis. Vol. Infantry
- Battles/wars: American Civil War

Charles Morton Webb (December 30, 1833 – August 12, 1911) was an American lawyer, Republican politician, and Wisconsin pioneer. He was a Wisconsin circuit court judge in central Wisconsin for the last 28 years of his life. Earlier in his career, he served as United States Attorney for the Western District of Wisconsin, appointed by Ulysses S. Grant, and served in the Wisconsin Senate during the 1869, 1870, and 1883 sessions.

His brothers, James H. Webb, William C. Webb, and Henry G. Webb, were also prominent lawyers and politicians. Their father, John Leland Webb, was a politician in Pennsylvania.

== Biography ==
Charles Morton Webb was born on December 30, 1833, in Towanda, Pennsylvania, the youngest of five children born to John L. Webb and Annis (Hammond) Webb. Webb received a basic education there, but left school at age 12 to work as a typesetter in a printing office. He attended the United States Military Academy for one year, in 1850, but then moved to Washington, D.C., to work for three years in the Government Publishing Office, where he was exposed to many of the debates taking place in the pre-Civil War capitol. He was inspired to a career in law and returned home to study with the leading lawyer in his home city. He was admitted to the bar in 1857 and that same year he married Jane Pierce.

His brothers, William and Henry had earlier traveled west to Wisconsin, and, in 1857, Charles Webb and his wife followed. In 1858, Charles worked as a clerk for the Wisconsin State Assembly while his brother William was a member. He moved to Grand Rapids, Wisconsin, in April 1858, where he would reside until his death. He was elected District Attorney of Wood County, Wisconsin, in 1858 and was re-elected in 1860, but resigned in 1861 to volunteer for service in the American Civil War.

Webb has commissioned a 1st Lieutenant for Company G in the 12th Wisconsin Volunteer Infantry Regiment as it was organized in Madison, Wisconsin. They mustered into service in October 1961 and marched out in December en route to Fort Leavenworth, Kansas. They were attached to the Department of Kansas, operating in the Trans-Mississippi Theater of the American Civil War. The regiment patrolled and garrisoned in the Leavenworth area through the spring of 1862. In May 1862, after serving eight months, Webb resigned his commission and returned to Wisconsin.

Back in Wood County, he was elected Clerk of the County Board of Supervisors in 1864, and was re-elected in 1866. In 1868, he was elected to the Wisconsin State Senate as a Republican, serving in the 1869 and 1870 sessions. In the summer of 1870, after the end of the legislative session—which ran from January 12 through March 17—Webb was appointed United States Attorney for the Western District of Wisconsin by President Ulysses S. Grant. He was re-appointed in 1874 and continued in office until 1878. In 1880, he was elected Mayor of Grand Rapids, Wisconsin, and was re-elected in 1881. In the fall of 1881, he was appointed register of the United States General Land Office in Deadwood, Dakota Territory, but resigned the following summer to return to Wisconsin.

He was elected to another term in the State Senate in 1882, but he would again leave before the end of his term in late 1883, when he was appointed to the Wisconsin Circuit Court by Governor Jeremiah McLain Rusk. Webb would remain Judge of the 7th Circuit for the remaining 28 years of his life, winning re-election five times, in 1884, 1890, 1896, 1902, and 1908. However, he would attempt several times to seek higher office: In 1893, he ran for election to the Wisconsin Supreme Court, but was defeated by Alfred Newman; in 1894, he unsuccessfully sought the Republican nomination for Governor against William H. Upham. Webb was, after the 1894 election, offered an appointment to the Wisconsin Supreme Court by Governor Upham, but he declined.

Webb died on August 12, 1911.

== Electoral history ==
=== Wisconsin Supreme Court (1893) ===
Wisconsin Supreme Court Election, 1893
Party	Candidate	Votes	%	±%
General Election, April 7, 1893
Nonpartisan	Alfred W. Newman	123,476	61.93%	
Nonpartisan	Charles M. Webb	73,803	37.02%	
	Scattering	2,092	1.05%	
Total votes		199,371	100.0%	
