= Senator Waring =

Senator Waring may refer to:

- George D. Waring (1819–1893), Wisconsin State Senate
- Jim Waring (born 1967), Arizona State Senate
