= Modern Woodmen of America =

American fraternal benefit society

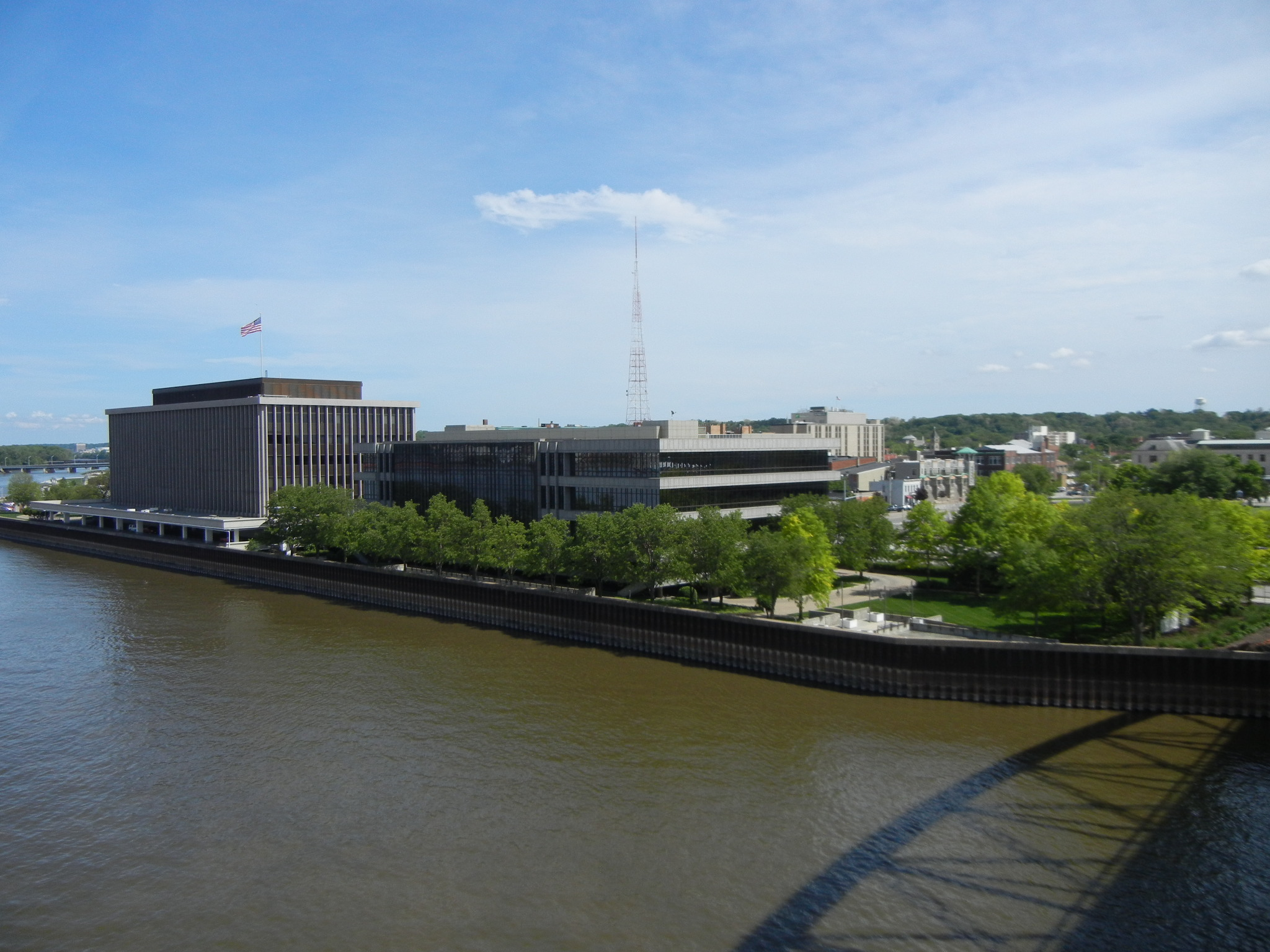
- Headquarters for Modern Woodmen of America
- Type: Fraternal Benefit Society
- Industry: Insurance: life and annuity
- Founded: 1883; 143 years ago in Lyons, Iowa
- Headquarters: Rock Island, Illinois, U.S.
- Key people: Jerald Lyphout (CEO, president)
- Products: Life insurance, annuities, investments
- Total assets: ▲US$18.64 billion (2025)
- Number of employees: 500+ (2025)
- Subsidiaries: MWA Financial Services, Inc; MWA General Insurance Agency
- Website: modernwoodmen.org

Modern Woodmen of America (MWA) is an American fraternal benefit society, which sells various investments and insurance products, with membership at nearly 700,000 as of 2025. Total assets reached US$18.6 billion in 2025, making it the third largest such organization by assets, behind Thrivent and Knights of Columbus. Though it shares the same founder, it is not affiliated financially in any way with another, similarly styled fraternal benefit society, WoodmenLife, and despite the name "Modern" is actually older than its counterpart.

== History ==
=== Early years ===
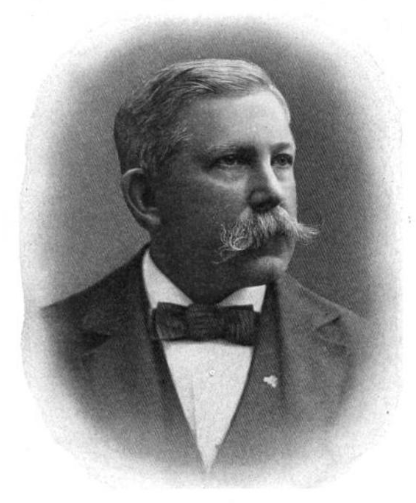
Joseph Cullen Root

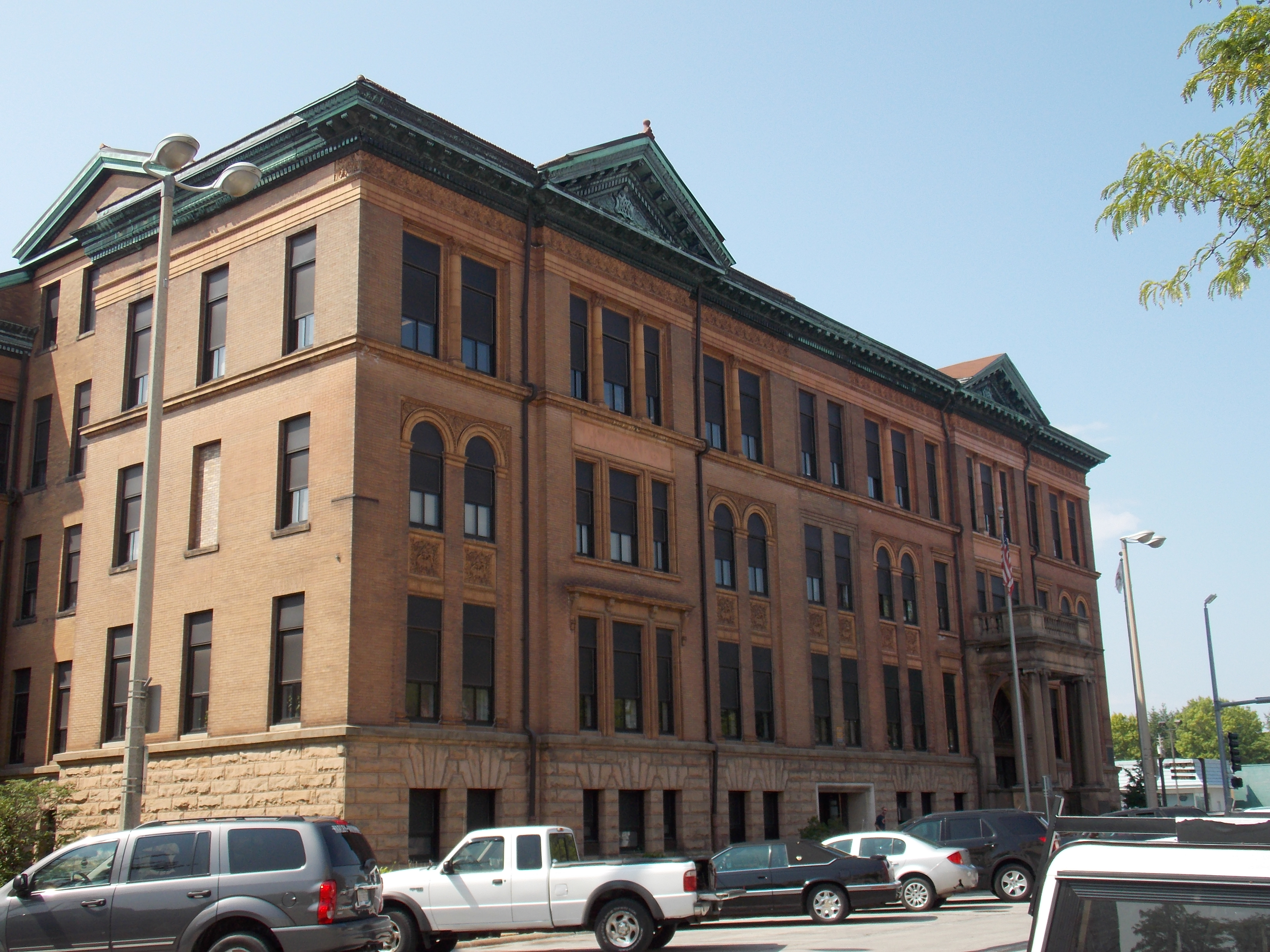
Original home-office building in Rock Island

Modern Woodmen of America was founded by Joseph Cullen Root on January 5, 1883, in Lyons, Iowa. He had operated a number of businesses, including a mercantile establishment, a grain elevator and two flour mills, sold insurance and real estate, taught bookkeeping classes, managed a lecture bureau, and practiced law. Root was a member of several fraternal societies throughout the years. He wanted to create an organization that would protect families following the death of a breadwinner.

During a Sunday sermon, Root heard the pastor tell a parable about pioneer woodmen clearing away forests to build homes, communities and security for their families. He adopted the term "woodmen" for his organization. To complete the name, he added "modern" to reflect the need to stay current and change with the times, and "of America" to symbolize patriotism.

Originally, Modern Woodmen had a unique set of membership restrictions and criteria. Religiously, the group was quite open, accepting "Jew and Gentile, the Catholic and Protestant, the agnostic and the atheist." However, until the mid-1900s, membership was restricted to white males between the ages of 18 and 45 from the 12 "healthiest" states – Ohio, Indiana, Illinois, Michigan, Wisconsin, Minnesota, Iowa, Missouri, the Dakotas, Nebraska and Kansas. Residents of large cities were also disqualified from membership, as were those employed in certain professions, such as railway workers, underground miners, gunpowder factory employees, liquor wholesalers and manufacturers, saloon keepers, "aeronauts", sailors on the lakes and seas, and professional baseball players. Today, anybody who purchases life insurance or an annuity automatically becomes a member.

In 1884, the head office was organized in Fulton, Illinois. The first death claim of $698.58 was paid the same year.

=== Foresters drill teams ===
One of the most unique elements of the organization was its drill teams, which came to be known as the Modern Woodmen Foresters. The first drill team was organized in Hutchinson, Kansas, in 1894. These groups became nationally known for events held from 1890 to the late 1930s, and the Foresters were even honored by Herbert Hoover at the White House.

Because each group was differentiated by a different style and color of uniform, their demonstrations were referred to as "Rainbow Parades." The Rainbow Parades were hosted by cities across the United States and included 10,000 units of Foresters, with more than 160,000 men participating. The last known Rainbow Parade was held on Michigan Boulevard in Chicago, and it halted traffic for more than two hours while thousands of spectators viewed the scene.

=== Modern Woodmen Sanatorium ===
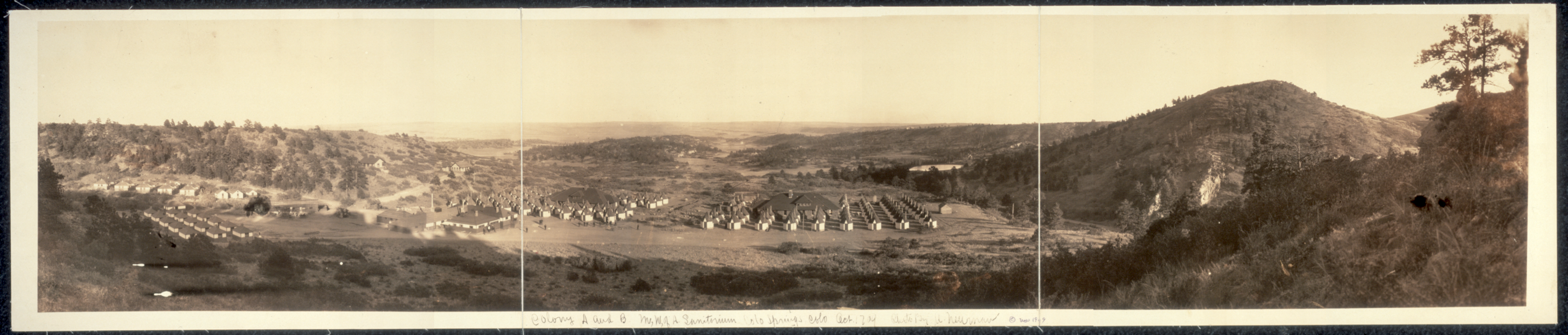
Modern Woodmen Sanitorium in Colorado Springs (1909)

During the tuberculosis (TB) epidemic of the early 1900s, Modern Woodmen opened a 1,000-acre (4.0 km^{2}) facility in Colorado Springs, Colorado, in 1907. The facility cost $1.5 million to build and was named one of the most outstanding institutions for the treatment of TB by the American College of Surgeons. From 1909 to 1947, the sanatorium provided free treatment to more than 12,000 members. It offered board, lodging, treatment, medicine, dental work and laundering, all at no expense to the patient.

Tuberculosis was the leading cause of death among Modern Woodmen members when the society opened the Modern Woodmen Tuberculosis Sanatorium. Following World War II, antibiotics became available and TB declined in the United States. The facility closed in 1947, when TB ranked eighth in leading causes of death.

=== Home offices ===
Modern Woodmen's first home office was organized in Fulton, Illinois, in 1884. When the organization moved to Rock Island, Illinois, in 1897, Fulton residents fought to keep Modern Woodmen in their town. The move was blocked three times before it was successful. In 1898, Modern Woodmen officially opened its home office at 1504 Third Ave.

In 1967, Modern Woodmen opened a new home office, located at 1701 First Avenue in Rock Island, Illinois, to accommodate its rapid growth. Its home office remains there today, where the organization maintains an active role in the Quad Cities community.

In 2008, Modern Woodmen became the naming rights sponsor of Modern Woodmen Park, home of the Quad Cities River Bandits, in Davenport, Iowa.

In 2026, Modern Woodmen became the naming rights sponsor of Modern Woodmen Field, home of the Modesto Roadsters of the Pioneer League in Modesto, California.

== Fraternalism ==
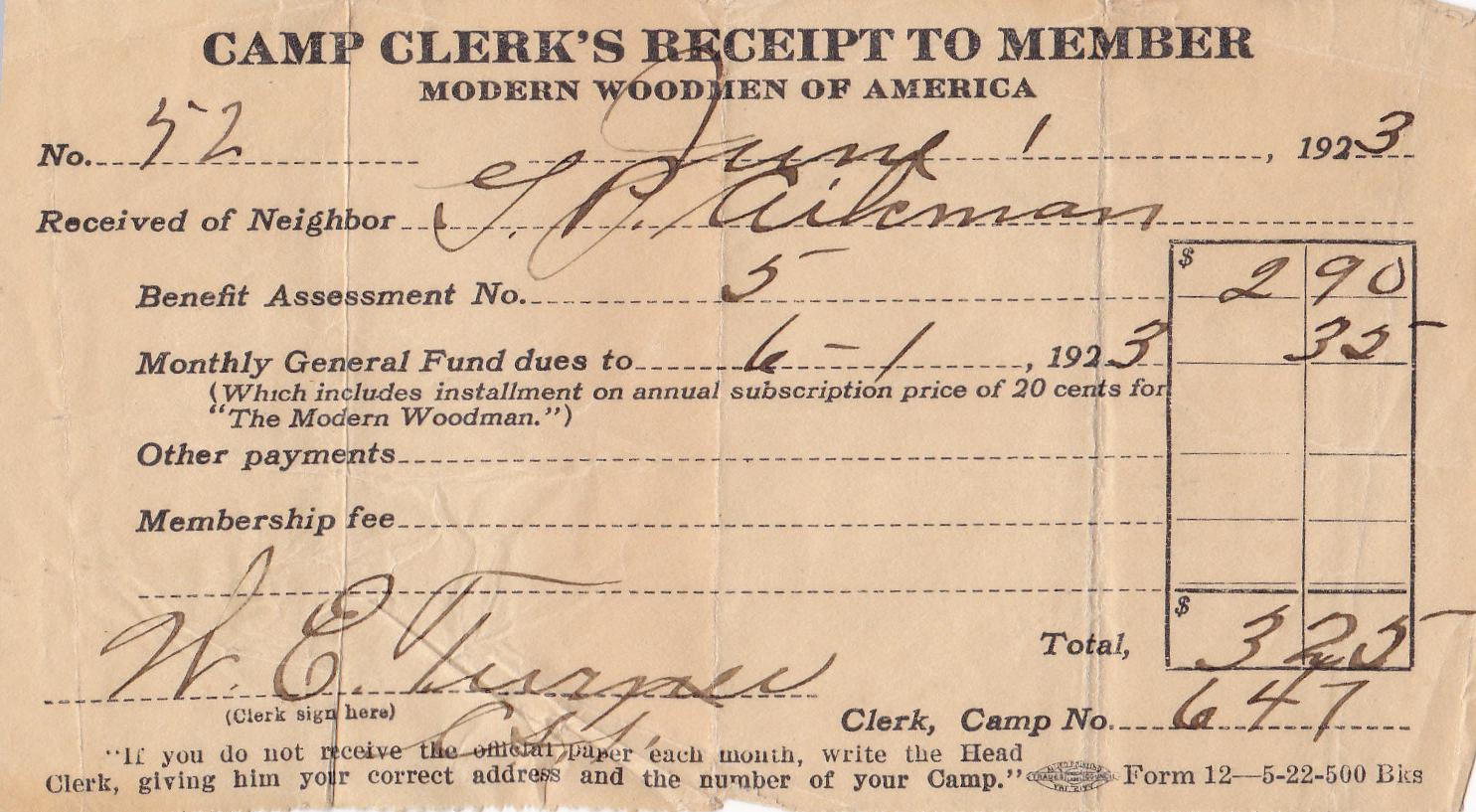
Membership dues receipt circa 1923

Modern Woodmen is a tax-exempt fraternal benefit society. The membership organization sells life insurance, annuity and investment products to help fund member benefits and social, educational and volunteer programs that meet community needs.

As a fraternal organization, the society is organized around a lodge system, called chapters, Summit chapters and youth service clubs. These groups offer fellowship and community service opportunities for members. In 2025, Modern Woodmen members were part of 2,281 chapters, 235 Summit chapters and 376 youth service clubs nationwide.

Modern Woodmen members across the United States participate in numerous activities to socialize, learn and volunteer in their communities. Members unite for volunteer efforts that provide money, donations, hand-on labor and other resources to improve lives in their communities. The organization's Matching Fund Program matches money raised by individual chapters for community members or local organizations in need.

Modern Woodmen's fraternal expenditures for member benefits and community programs totaled $22.6 million in 2025. These programs included fraternal aid, college scholarships, newborn benefits, orphan benefits, final wishes resources, member discounts and youth educational programs.

In 2026, Modern Woodmen introduced Money & Me℠, a financial literacy program designed to introduce elementary and middle school students (K-8) to financial concepts in an engaging, age-appropriate way. The program is easily deployed in classrooms with curriculum that's written for and by educators. The programs are donated by local Modern Woodmen Representatives across the country at no cost to the teacher or school.

== Products ==
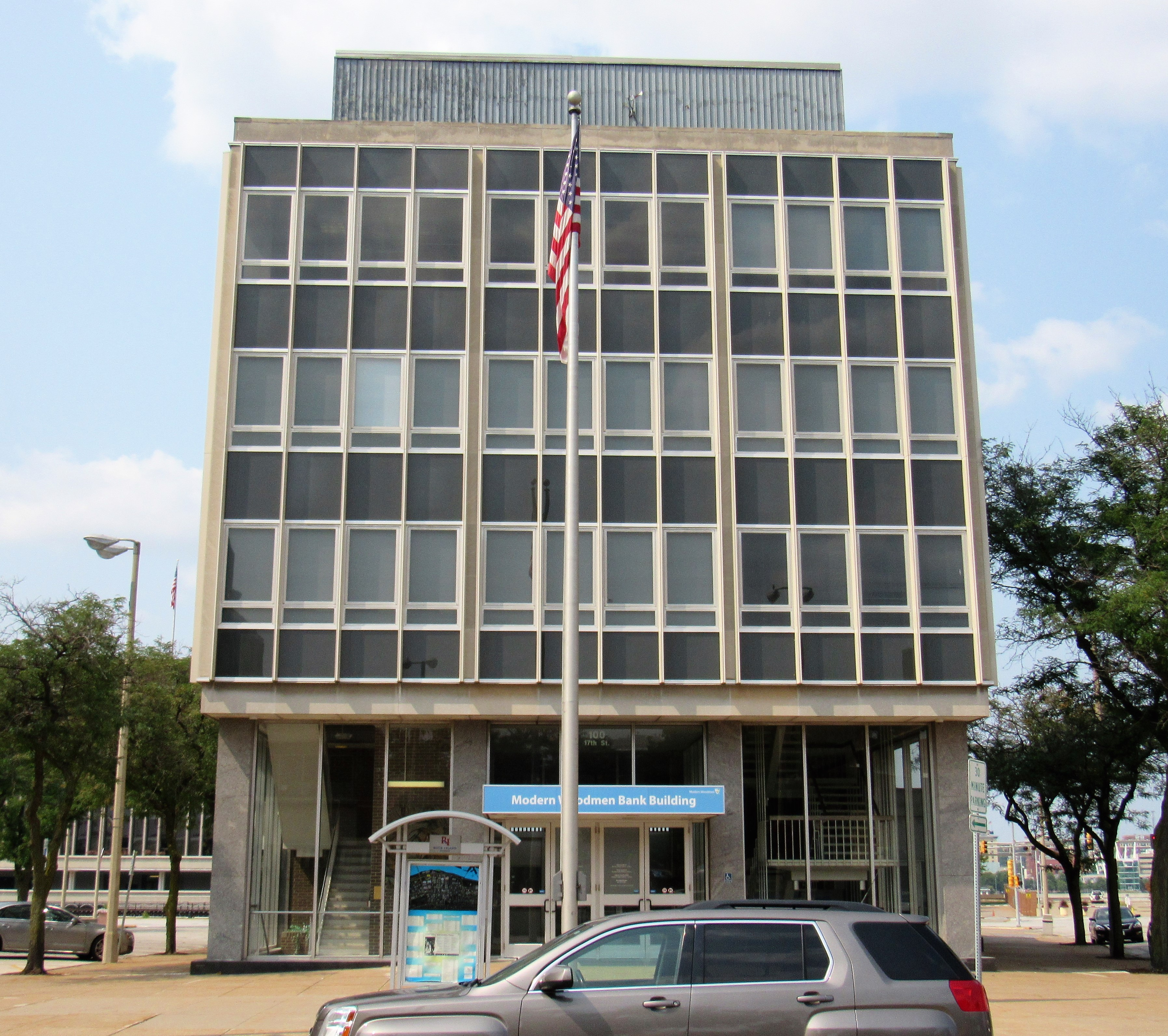
Modern Woodmen Bank in Rock Island

Modern Woodmen and its subsidiaries provide life insurance, annuities, and investment products to individuals and businesses. Life insurance in force totaled over $46 billion in 2025. Modern Woodmen has two wholly owned subsidiaries:

- MWA Financial Services, Inc., founded in 2001, functions as an introducing broker-dealer and distributes securities products. In 2016, it became dually registered as an investment adviser with the SEC.
- Modern Woodmen General Insurance Agency, founded in 2002, offers brokered insurance products, including health insurance, long-term care insurance, disability income insurance and more.

In 2003, Modern Woodmen started MWABank, primarily a direct bank. In 2018, Axos Bank of Axos Financial Inc, acquired $225 million of deposits from MWABank.

== Financial standing ==
A.M. Best rates Modern Woodmen's financial stability, security and management performance as A (Excellent), the third highest of 13 ratings. The rating is based on a comprehensive quantitative evaluation of the organization's balance sheet strength, operating performance and business profile. Insurers in the Excellent category are considered to have an excellent ability to meet their ongoing obligations.

Kroll Bond Rating Agency (KBRA) has assigned Modern Woodmen an insurance financial strength rating of AA−, the fourth highest of its 22 rating categories.

Modern Woodmen follows a conservative investment approach, holding nearly 80 percent of its portfolio in corporate and government bonds. As of year-end 2025, Modern Woodmen held $116.67 for every $100 in liabilities.

== Notable members ==
- Granville Pearl Aikman (1858–1923), State of Kansas District Judge and suffragist
