= Columbia Township, Bradford County, Pennsylvania =

Township in Pennsylvania, US

Coordinates: 41°50′00″N 76°52′59″W

Columbia Township, Pennsylvania
- Township
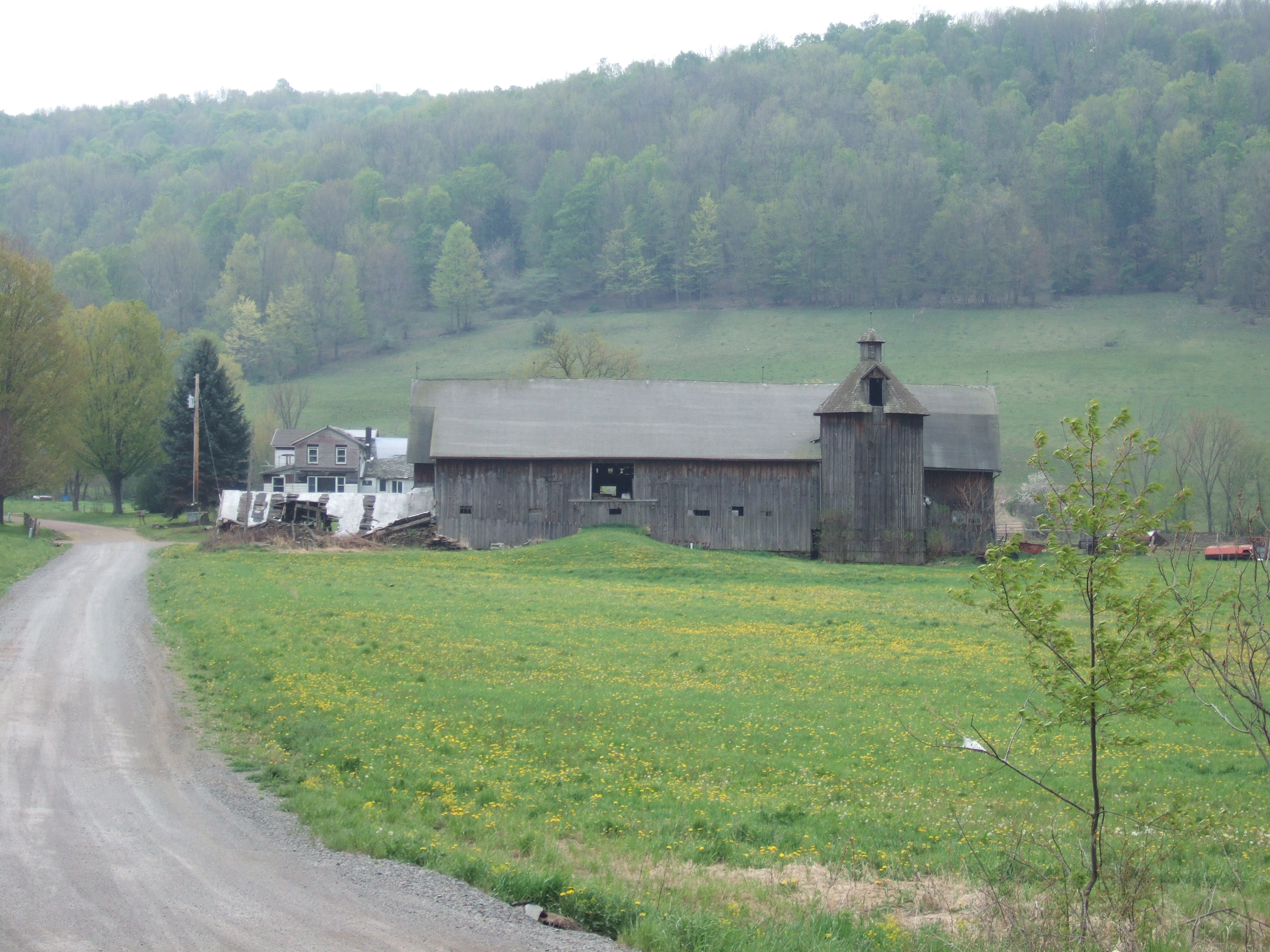
- A farm in Columbia Township

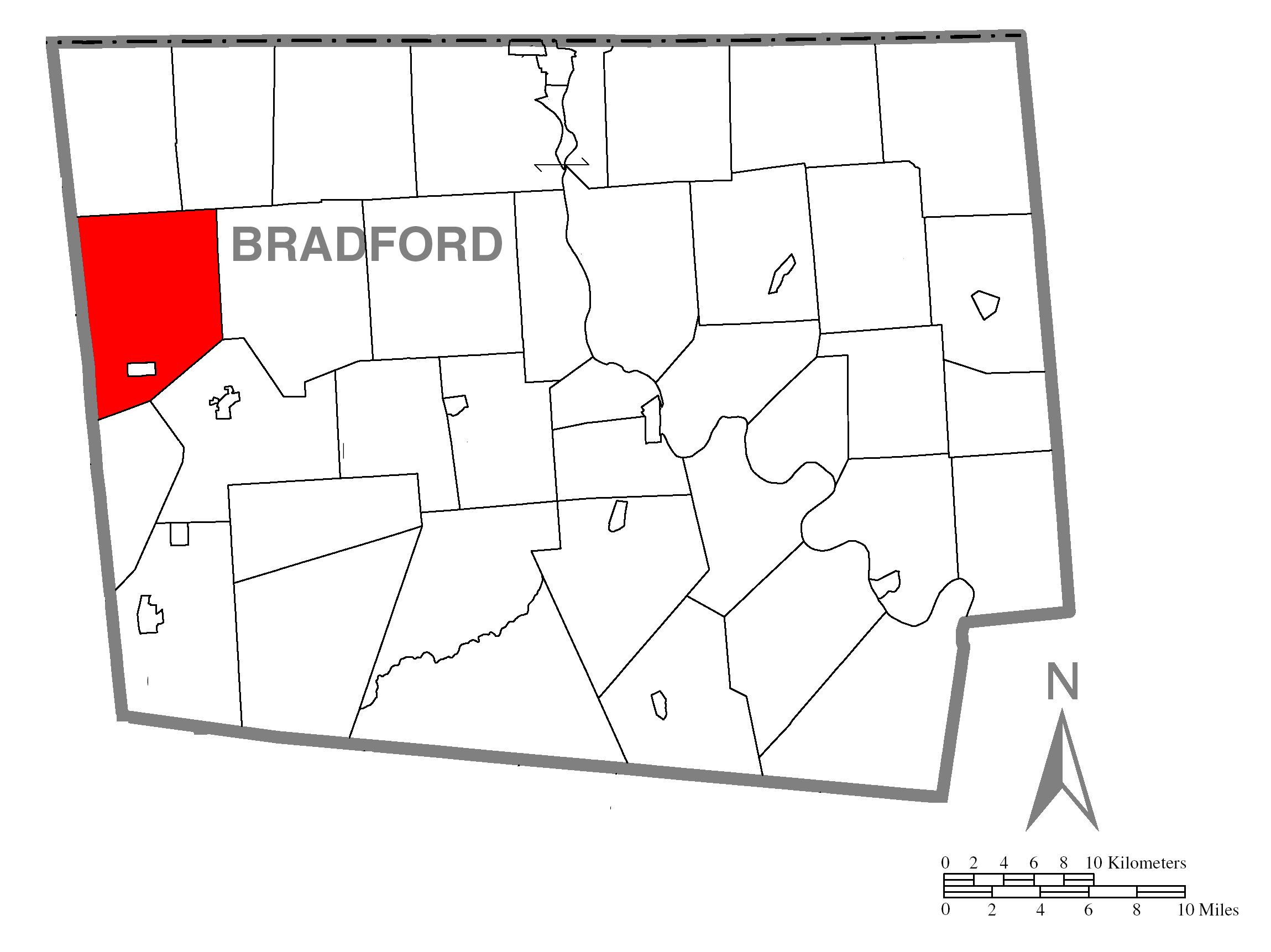
- Map of Bradford County, Pennsylvania highlighting Columbia Township

- Map of Bradford County, Pennsylvania
- Country: United States
- State: Pennsylvania
- County: Bradford
- Settled: 1795
- Incorporated: 1813

Area
  - Total: 40.95 sq mi (106.06 km^{2})
  - Land: 40.87 sq mi (105.84 km^{2})
  - Water: 0.085 sq mi (0.22 km^{2})

Population (2020)
  - Total: 1,165 ▼
  - Estimate (2023): 1,148
  - Density: 28.4/sq mi (10.98/km^{2})
- FIPS code: 42-015-15376

Columbia Township is a township in Bradford County, Pennsylvania, United States. It is part of Northeastern Pennsylvania. The population was 1,165 at the 2020 census. Children residing in the township are assigned to attend the Troy Area School District.

== Geography ==
Columbia Township is located in western Bradford County, bordered to the north by Wells Township, by South Creek Township to the northeast, by Springfield Township to the east, by Troy Township to the southeast, and by Armenia Township to the south. Tioga County is to the west, containing Sullivan Township to the southwest and Rutland Township to the northwest. The borough of Sylvania is surrounded by the southern part of the township but is separate. The township has two unincorporated villages: Columbia Cross Roads in the east, and Austinville in the west.

According to the United States Census Bureau, Columbia Township has a total area of 41.0 square miles (106.1 km^{2}), of which 40.8 square miles (105.8 km^{2}) is land and 0.08 square miles (0.2 km^{2}), or 0.21%, is water.

== Demographics ==
Historical population
| Census | Pop. | Note | %± |
|---|---|---|---|
| 2010 | 1,196 | | — |
| 2020 | 1,165 | | −2.6% |
| 2023 (est.) | 1,148 | | −1.5% |
U.S. Decennial Census

As of the census of 2000, there were 1,162 people, 425 households, and 337 families residing in the township. The population density was 28.0 people per square mile (10.8 people/km^{2}). There were 474 housing units at an average density of 11.4 per square mile (4.4/km^{2}). The racial makeup of the township was 98.62% White, 0.26% Native American, 0.17% Asian, 0.52% from other races, and 0.43% from two or more races. Hispanic or Latino of any race were 0.26% of the population.

There were 425 households, out of which 35.8% had children under the age of 18 living with them, 67.8% were married couples living together, 6.8% had a female householder with no husband present, and 20.7% were non-families. 17.4% of all households were made up of individuals, and 9.4% had someone living alone who was 65 years of age or older. The average household size was 2.72 and the average family size was 3.04.

In the township the population was spread out, with 28.6% under the age of 18, 6.0% from 18 to 24, 28.2% from 25 to 44, 23.3% from 45 to 64, and 13.9% who were 65 years of age or older. The median age was 38 years. For every 100 females, there were 92.1 males. For every 100 females age 18 and over, there were 95.8 males.

The median income for a household in the township was $36,118, and the median income for a family was $38,393. Males had a median income of $27,596 versus $19,038 for females. The per capita income for the township was $16,320. About 8.8% of families and 11.4% of the population were below the poverty line, including 16.3% of those under age 18 and 7.5% of those age 65 or over.

== Notable person ==
- Stephen Fowler Wilson - U.S. Congressman from 1865 to 1869, Pennsylvania State Senator from 1863 to 1865
