= Edgar Carlson =

American politician

Edgar A. Carlson

Member of the Pennsylvania House of Representatives from the 68th district
- In office 1985–1992
- Preceded by: Warren Spencer
- Succeeded by: Matt E. Baker

Personal details
- Born: September 2, 1929 Harwick, Pennsylvania
- Died: June 24, 2008 (aged 78) Williamsport, Pennsylvania
- Party: Republican

Edgar A. Carlson (September 2, 1929 – June 24, 2008) was a Republican member of the Pennsylvania House of Representatives.
