= Granville Pearl Aikman =

American judge

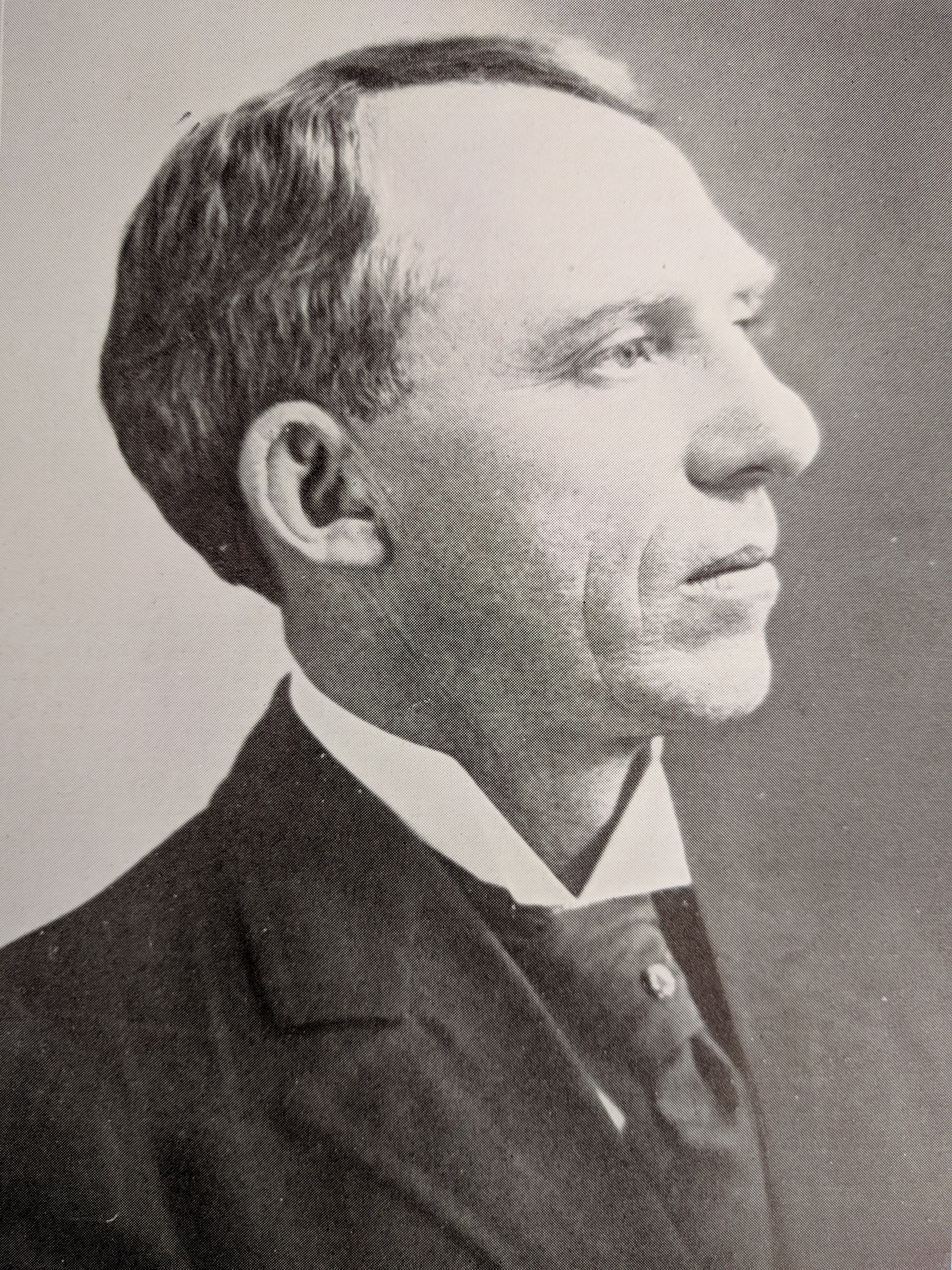
- Official photo of 13th District Judge G.P. Aikman, circa 1900

Judge of the 13th District Court of Kansas
- In office 1900–1913

Butler County Probate Judge
- In office 1884–1888

Personal details
- Born: Granville Pearl Aikman; December 26, 1858 London, Kentucky, U.S.
- Died: September 29, 1923 (aged 64) El Dorado, Kansas, U.S.
- Spouse: Caroline Sandifer
- Children: 2
- Education: Laurel Seminary (London, Kentucky)

Granville Pearl Aikman (December 26, 1858 – September 29, 1923) was an American attorney and judge who was a Judge of the 13th District Court of Kansas from 1900 until 1913. During his time on the bench, he presided over many cases involving railroad and oil companies, and issued several historically first injunctions and decisions. A supporter of women's suffrage, he appointed the first female bailiff in the history of the United States, and empaneled the first jury consisting entirely of women in the history of Kansas (second ever in the United States).

== Early life ==
Aikman was born in 1858 in London, Kentucky. He attended the Laurel Seminary in his hometown. After his family moved to Kansas in 1871, Aikman began attending the schools of Butler County and eventually befriended William Allen White.

Upon completing his education at age 18, Aikman obtained a teaching certificate and taught school for four years to help support his family and fund his further studies, reading law in the offices of Sluss & Hatten, in Wichita. He was admitted to the bar association of Kansas in 1881; the following year he began practicing law in El Dorado, Kansas, and joined the Freemasons, the Knights of Pythias, and the Modern Woodmen.

== Judicial career ==
Aikman was elected Probate Judge in 1883, and served four years (two terms) from 1884 to 1888. Upon leaving office, he returned to private practice, until 1900, when, as a Republican, he was elected a Judge of the 13th District Court of Kansas.

During his time as a district court judge, Aikman presided over more than 100 cases involving railroad companies; in two cases, his decisions resulted in new state law. In the first instance, he issued a permanent injunction against the Santa Fe Railroad, preventing it from drilling for oil and gas on its right-of-way. In the second, he was the first judge to hold that railroad companies cannot escape their responsibility for damages by hiring private companies to burn overgrowth on their right-of-way. He also issued the first ever injunction in Kansas against railway and express companies delivering whiskey (during Prohibition).

In 1905, Aikman presided over a notable antitrust case, Board of Railroad Commissioners of the State of Kansas v. Atchison, Topeka and Santa Fe Railway Company, in which the State of Kansas sought to revoke the charter of the railroad company, accusing them of conspiring with competing railroads to fix prices, working with Standard Oil to fix oil prices in Kansas, and cooperating with Chicago and Kansas City meat packers to regulate prices of meat and freight costs.

Aikman was the first judge in Kansas to hold that the Old Soldiers Preference Law (a state law giving preferential hiring treatment to former soldiers in public jobs) was constitutional, with the Kansas State Supreme Court later affirming.

In 1906, Aikman presided over the murder case of Lewis Bloomfield, and sentenced him to life imprisonment. In total, he presided over 12 murder trials, some of national notoriety, and was only reversed upon appeal once (his original decision was later sustained by the State Supreme Court). Aikman was frequently paid compliment by the Kansas Supreme Court for his competence and knowledge of the law.

In 1907, Aikman presided over a case involving the kidnapping of the "St. Louis World's Fair Incubator Baby", which received national coverage.

Aikman was a strong supporter of women's suffrage. He wrote and presented the first resolution endorsing it in Kansas at a Republican State Convention, doing so against the recommendations of many leading Republicans (who opposed the measure and claimed it would ruin him politically); he presented the measure anyway, a vote was called, and it ultimately carried. After suffrage was passed in Kansas, in 1912, with just over a month left in office, he appointed the United States' first-ever female bailiff, and empanelled the first-ever jury consisting entirely of women in Kansas history (second ever in United States history, after San Francisco), to sit on the case of H. H. Boeck vs. Carrie M. Schreiber. According to Aikman:

Women became qualified to act as jurors when the new constitutional amendment made them electors. I desired the honor of presiding over the first trial in which their new rights were executed.

== Later life ==
Aikman left office after 1912 and returned to private practice with his brother, where he was recognized as a capable trial lawyer and jurist. He died on September 29, 1923. After his death, his widow published a book entitled Life and Character of Judge Granville P. Aikman, which consisted of many newspaper articles covering his life, political career and death, as well as tributes from his colleagues and friends, including Judges Allison Thompson Ayres, Volney P. Mooney, C. A. Leland, A. L. L. Hamilton and George J. Benson.
