= Matt E. Baker =

American politician

Matt Baker

Speaker pro tempore of the Pennsylvania House of Representatives
- In office January 4, 2011 – February 19, 2018
- Preceded by: Joseph Petrarca Jr.
- Succeeded by: Sheryl M. Delozier

Member of the Pennsylvania House of Representatives from the 68th district
- In office January 5, 1993 – February 19, 2018
- Preceded by: Edgar Carlson
- Succeeded by: Clint Owlett

Personal details
- Born: January 24, 1957 (age 69) Buffalo, New York, U.S.
- Party: Republican
- Spouse: Brenda Baker
- Education: Corning Community College; Mansfield University; Elmira College (BS)
- Website: Official website

Matthew E. Baker (born January 24, 1957) is a former Republican member of the Pennsylvania House of Representatives for the 68th District and was elected in 1992. He resigned from the House on February 19, 2018, to accept a job with the Trump Administration, regional director of the Office of Intergovernmental and External Affairs at the U.S. Department of Health and Human Services office in Philadelphia. For the 2017–18 legislative session, Baker was Republican Chairman of the House Health Committee. Upon his resignation, Rep. Kathy Rapp (R-65) was named to chair the committee.

== Education ==
Baker graduated from Cowanesque Valley High School in Westfield. He holds an associate degree from Corning Community College, and earned a Bachelor of Science degree as an honors scholar from Elmira College in Elmira, New York. He also has a Certificate in Business Management, and attended Mansfield University.

== Career ==
Prior to his election to the House, Baker served as a district legislative aide for 13 years. He worked in a Wellsboro law firm for twelve years where he specialized in serving people with disabilities. He helped them obtain Social Security and disability benefits before federal administrative law judges.

Baker has seen many of his bills become law, including Act 22 of 2012, known as Pennsylvania's Identity Theft Act, which makes it a felony of the third degree to commit a first offense of the crime of identity theft and provides a maximum penalty of seven years in prison and a $15,000 fine. A third or subsequent offense raises the crime to a felony of the second degree with a maximum penalty of 17 years in prison and a $125,000 fine. Act 166 of 2004 allows auto accident investigators to file summary charges up to a year after an accident, thereby giving law enforcement officials the necessary time needed to complete their investigation of the most difficult incidents – ones that cause serious bodily injury or death and frequently involve multiple vehicles.

== Opposition to marijuana legalization ==
Baker is opposed to cannabis legalization and does not support the legalization of medical cannabis. As chairman of the House Health Committee, Representative Baker has blocked medical cannabis legislation in PA. According to Baker: "Federal law places Marijuana as being so potentially harmful and dangerous that it has listed the drug as a schedule 1 drug right next to Heroin, LSD, Ecstasy, Meth, and many other drugs. This is in stark contrast to marijuana activists claiming Marijuana is harmless and should be approved as medicine. I have not found a preponderance of evidence that would support putting either children or adults at risk of serious adverse health reactions for cannabis oils that have not conclusively been proven to be safe, effective or even have the necessary support by the American Epilepsy Society, FDA, American Academy of Pediatrics, ... and many other groups too numerous to recite."

Baker has said that his stance against medical cannabis is based on "150 scientific studies showing the dangers of marijuana". Baker provided a list with "194 links to the information that he says has formed his unfavorable opinion of medical marijuana" to the Pittsburgh City Paper. The City Paper said that few links went to scientific studies.

== Personal life ==
Formerly of Westfield, Pennsylvania, Baker resides in Wellsboro, Tioga County, with his wife Brenda.
