= Clint Owlett =

American politician from Pennsylvania

Member of the Pennsylvania House of Representatives from the 68th district
- Incumbent
- Assumed office June 5, 2018
- Preceded by: Matthew Baker

Personal details
- Born: Tioga County, Pennsylvania, U.S.
- Party: Republican
- Spouse: Lauren Owlett
- Children: 4
- Education: New Covenant Academy High School
- Website: www.owlettforparep.com

Clinton D. Owlett is a Republican member of the Pennsylvania House of Representatives. He was elected from the 68th district on June 5, 2018.

== Early life and family ==
Owlett grew up on a dairy farm in Tioga County, Pennsylvania and attended New Covenant Academy. After graduating high school, Owlett completed an internship at Three Springs Ministries. There, he advanced to the position of director of program development and then general manager, before leaving to work at a ski resort. In 2012, he established his own construction and decorating company.

He is married and has four children.

== Career and political views ==
During the COVID-19 pandemic, Owlett introduced legislation that would allow religious institutions to gather in-person. He voted twice to lift the governor's emergency order, once on May 28, 2020, and again on June 9, 2020.

Owlett has amended drug laws, introducing a bill to permanently place carfentanil on the list of Schedule II controlled substances. He has encouraged legislators to co-sponsor laws that would consider it a felony to deliver drugs that results in serious injury.

Owlett supports the deregulation of small farms and the promotion of dairy products. He supports efforts to prohibit plant-based milk from using the term "milk", and advocates for schools to provide larger quantities of dairy milk with school lunches.

In 2021, Owlett supported two bills in the Pennsylvania Legislature that would restrict abortion: a "heartbeat bill" and the Down Syndrome Protection Act, which would prohibit abortions based on prenatal Down syndrome diagnosis.

As of 2023, Owlett's committee assignments are Agriculture & Rural Affairs, Appropriations, Ethics, and Judiciary.
