= Warren Spencer =

American politician

Warren H. Spencer

Member of the Pennsylvania House of Representatives from the 68th district
- In office 1969–1984
- Preceded by: District created
- Succeeded by: Edgar Carlson

Member of the Pennsylvania House of Representatives from the Tioga County district
- In office 1963–1968

Personal details
- Born: August 22, 1921 Wellsboro, Pennsylvania
- Died: March 11, 1991 (aged 69) Stuart, Florida
- Party: Republican

Warren H. Spencer (August 22, 1921 – March 11, 1991) was a Republican member of the Pennsylvania House of Representatives.
