= Troy Area School District =

School district in Pennsylvania

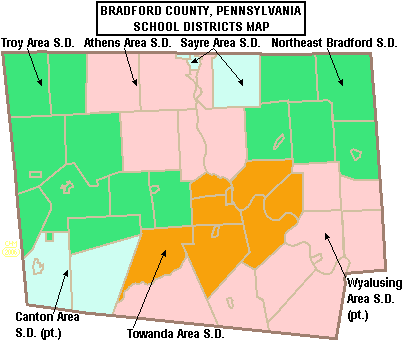

Address
- 68 Fenner Avenue Troy, Pennsylvania, 16947; United States

District information
- Type: Public

Students and staff
- District mascot: Trojans
- Colors: Red, white

Other information
- Website: www.troyareasd.org

Troy Area School District is a small, rural, public school district located in Bradford County, Pennsylvania. It covers the boroughs of Troy, Burlington, Sylvania and Alba and Wells Township, South Creek Township, Columbia Township, Springfield Township, Armenia Township, Troy Township, West Burlington Township, Burlington Township and Granville Township in Bradford County, Pennsylvania. Troy Area School District encompasses approximately 275 square miles (710 km^{2}). According to 2000 federal census data, it serves a resident population of 10,410. In 2009, the district residents’ per capita income was $15,806 while the median family income was $39,780. In the Commonwealth, the median family income was $49,501 and the United States median family income was $49,445, in 2010.

Troy Area School District operates Troy Area Junior Senior High School (7th–12th grades), Troy Intermediate School (3rd–6th grades) and WR Croman Elementary School (kindergarten-2nd grade). Formerly the district operated three elementary schools (K-4th), one middle school (5th-8th), and one senior high school, grades 9-12. Mosherville Elementary School and Troy Elementary School East were closed at the end of the 2011-12 school year. The rest of the schools were realigned. The 7th and 8th grade were added to the high school creating a junior senior high school. The school alignment changes were adopted to deal with a $2.3 million budget shortfall.

== Extracurriculars ==
The district offers a variety of clubs, activities and sports.

=== Clubs ===
- Speech and Debate
- National Honor Society
- National Junior Honor Society
- Student Council
- Yearbook
- Drama Club

=== Sports ===
- Football HS, JHS, ES
- Basketball (Boys and Girls) HS, JHS, ES
- Volleyball HS, JHS, ES
- Wrestling HS, JHS, ES
- Cross Country
- Track and Field
- Soccer Boys and Girls
- Cheerleading
- Baseball
- Softball

The district also pays teachers to run an extensive intramural program for the elementary students
