= Springfield Township, Bradford County, Pennsylvania =

Township in Pennsylvania, US

Coordinates: 41°51′34″N 76°45′29″W

- Township
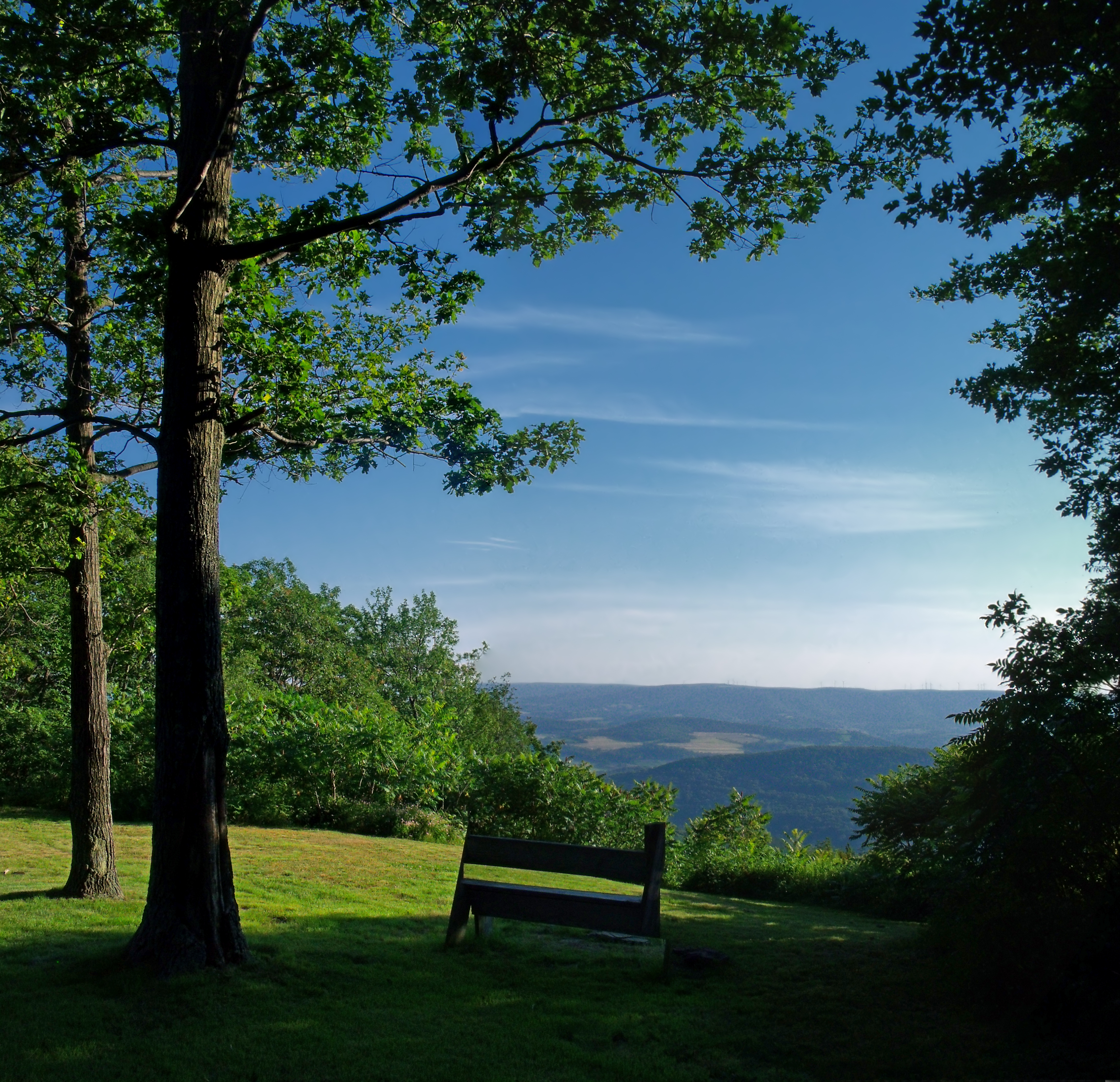
- A vista from Mount Pisgah

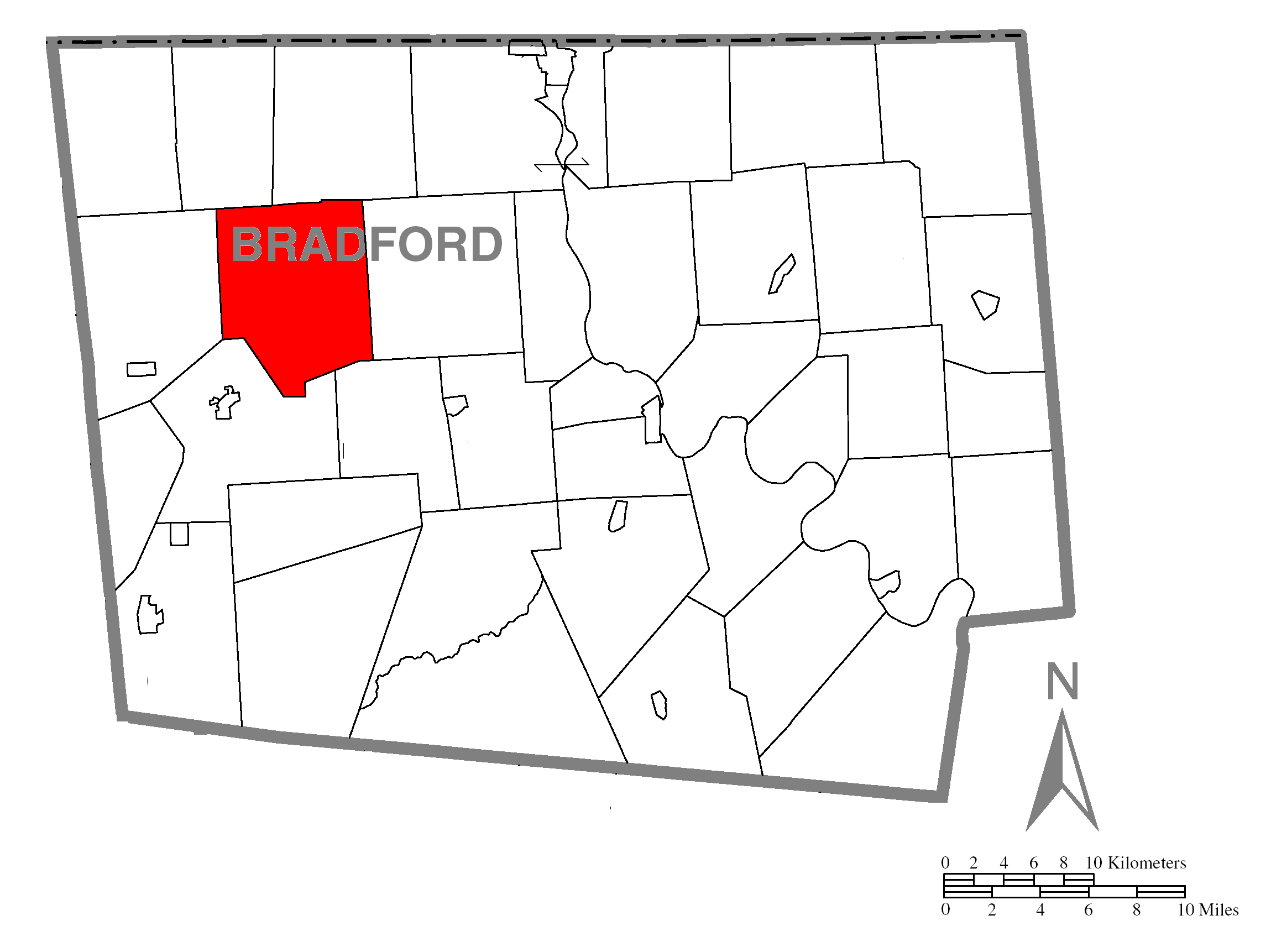
- Map of Bradford County with Springfield Township highlighted

- Map of Bradford County, Pennsylvania
- Country: United States
- State: Pennsylvania
- County: Bradford
- Settled: 1803
- Incorporated: 1813

Area
  - Total: 41.83 sq mi (108.35 km^{2})
  - Land: 41.59 sq mi (107.73 km^{2})
  - Water: 0.24 sq mi (0.62 km^{2})

Population (2020)
  - Total: 1,147 ▲
  - Estimate (2023): 1,131
  - Density: 25.6/sq mi (9.89/km^{2})
- FIPS code: 42-015-73008

Springfield Township is a township in Bradford County, Pennsylvania, United States. The population was 1,147 at the 2020 census. Children residing in the township are assigned to attend the Troy Area School District.

== Geography ==
Springfield Township is located in northwestern Bradford County and is bordered by South Creek and Ridgebury townships to the north, Smithfield Township to the east, West Burlington Township to the southeast, Troy Township to the south and southwest, and Columbia Township to the west.

According to the United States Census Bureau, the township has a total area of 41.8 square miles (108.3 km^{2}), of which 41.6 square miles (107.7 km^{2}) is land and 0.23 square miles (0.6 km^{2}), or 0.57%, is water.

== Demographics ==
Historical population
| Census | Pop. | Note | %± |
|---|---|---|---|
| 2010 | 1,124 | | — |
| 2020 | 1,147 | | 2.0% |
| 2023 (est.) | 1,131 | | −1.4% |
U.S. Decennial Census

As of the census of 2000, there were 1,167 people, 424 households, and 345 families residing in the township. The population density was 27.9 inhabitants per square mile (10.8/km^{2}). There were 557 housing units at an average density of 13.3/sq mi (5.1/km^{2}). The racial makeup of the township was 98.80% White, 0.17% African American, 0.09% from other races, and 0.94% from two or more races. Hispanic or Latino of any race were 0.26% of the population.

There were 424 households, out of which 32.8% had children under the age of 18 living with them, 70.3% were married couples living together, 8.0% had a female householder with no husband present, and 18.4% were non-families. 15.8% of all households were made up of individuals, and 9.0% had someone living alone who was 65 years of age or older. The average household size was 2.75 and the average family size was 3.05.

In the township the population was spread out, with 26.4% under the age of 18, 6.2% from 18 to 24, 26.2% from 25 to 44, 24.9% from 45 to 64, and 16.4% who were 65 years of age or older. The median age was 40 years. For every 100 females, there were 99.8 males. For every 100 females age 18 and over, there were 94.8 males.

The median income for a household in the township was $36,625, and the median income for a family was $40,333. Males had a median income of $27,935 versus $20,982 for females. The per capita income for the township was $14,804. About 7.4% of families and 9.3% of the population were below the poverty line, including 12.9% of those under age 18 and 11.9% of those age 65 or over.
