= George D. Waring =

American politician

George Dwight Waring (October 14, 1819 – January 11, 1893) was a member of the Wisconsin State Senate.

== Biography ==
Waring was born on October 14, 1819, in Masonville, New York. He moved to Berlin, Wisconsin, in 1855. He died in Dallas in 1893.

== Career ==
Waring was originally elected to the Senate in 1868. Previously, he was Mayor of Berlin from 1857 to 1861 and District Attorney of Green Lake County, Wisconsin, from 1861 to 1865. He was a Republican.
