= Sylvania, Pennsylvania =

Borough in Pennsylvania, US

- Borough
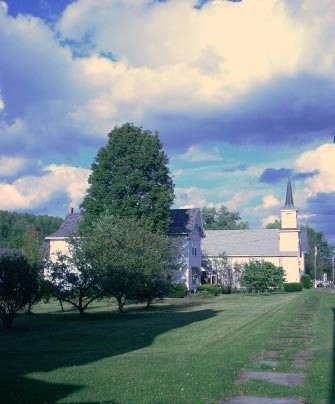
- Sylvania, Pennsylvania

- Location of Sylvania in Bradford County, Pennsylvania.

- Location of Sylvania in the state of Pennsylvania
- Coordinates: 41°48′20″N 76°51′19″W
- Country: United States
- State: Pennsylvania
- County: Bradford
- Settled: 1795
- Incorporated: 1853

Government

Area
  - Total: 1.12 sq mi (2.89 km^{2})
  - Land: 1.12 sq mi (2.89 km^{2})
  - Water: 0 sq mi (0.00 km^{2})
- Elevation: 1,378 ft (420 m)

Population (2020)
  - Total: 216 ▼
  - Estimate (2021): 216
  - Density: 188.4/sq mi (72.73/km^{2})
- Time zone: UTC-5 (Eastern (EST))
  - Summer (DST): UTC-4 (EDT)
- Zip Code: 16945
- Area code: 570
- FIPS code: 42-75944

Sylvania is a borough in Bradford County, Pennsylvania, United States. It is part of Northeastern Pennsylvania. The population was 216 at the 2020 census. Children residing in the borough are assigned to attend the Troy Area School District.

== Geography ==
Sylvania is located at 41°48′20″N 76°51′19″W (41.805563, −76.855353). According to the U.S. Census Bureau, the borough has a total area of 1.1 square miles (2.8 km^{2}), all land.

== Demographics ==
Historical population
Census	Pop.	Note	%±
1860	215		—
1870	212		−1.4%
1880	227		7.1%
1890	241		6.2%
1900	203		−15.8%
1910	217		6.9%
1920	188		−13.4%
1930	194		3.2%
1940	196		1.0%
1950	211		7.7%
1960	243		15.2%
1970	241		−0.8%
1980	236		−2.1%
1990	203		−14.0%
2000	200		−1.5%
2010	219		9.5%
2020	215		−1.8%
2021 (est.)	216	▲	0.5%

=== 2010 ===
At the 2010 census there were 219 people, 82 households, and 61 families living in the borough. The population density was 199.1 inhabitants per square mile (76.9/km^{2}). There were 88 housing units at an average density of 80 per square mile (31.2/km^{2}). The racial makeup of the borough was 96.3% White, 0.5% American Indian, 0.9% Asian and 2.3% two or more races. There were 82 households, 37.8% had children under the age of 18 living with them, 56.1% were married couples living together, 9.8% had a female householder with no husband present, and 25.6% were non-families. 23.2% of households were made up of individuals, and 12.2% were one person aged 65 or older. The average household size was 2.67 and the average family size was 3.02.

The age distribution was 26% under the age of 18, 58.5% from 18 to 64, and 15.5% 65 or older. The median age was 39.6 years.

The median household income was $42,813 and the median family income was $48,125. Males had a median income of $45,521 versus $23,750 for females. The per capita income for the borough was $22,699. About 20.5% of families and 18.3% of the population were below the poverty line, including 29.4% of those under the age of eighteen and none of those sixty five or over.

=== 2000 ===
At the 2000 census there were 200 people, 76 households, and 55 families living in the borough. The population density was 322.5 inhabitants per square mile (124.5/km^{2}). There were 85 housing units at an average density of 137.1 per square mile (52.9/km^{2}). The racial makeup of the borough was 100.00% White. There were 76 households, 36.8% had children under the age of 18 living with them, 53.9% were married couples living together, 11.8% had a female householder with no husband present, and 27.6% were non-families. 21.1% of households were made up of individuals, and 10.5% were one person aged 65 or older. The average household size was 2.63 and the average family size was 2.93.

The age distribution was 25.5% under the age of 18, 9.0% from 18 to 24, 28.0% from 25 to 44, 27.0% from 45 to 64, and 10.5% 65 or older. The median age was 38 years. For every 100 females there were 108.3 males. For every 100 females age 18 and over, there were 98.7 males.

The median household income was $35,000 and the median family income was $41,750. Males had a median income of $27,083 versus $20,179 for females. The per capita income for the borough was $15,181. About 7.5% of families and 11.8% of the population were below the poverty line, including 11.4% of those under the age of eighteen and 14.3% of those sixty five or over.
