= South Creek Township, Pennsylvania =

Township in Pennsylvania, US

Coordinates: 41°57′21″N 76°47′16″W

South Creek Township, Pennsylvania Bradford County Zip/Postal Code 16925
- Township
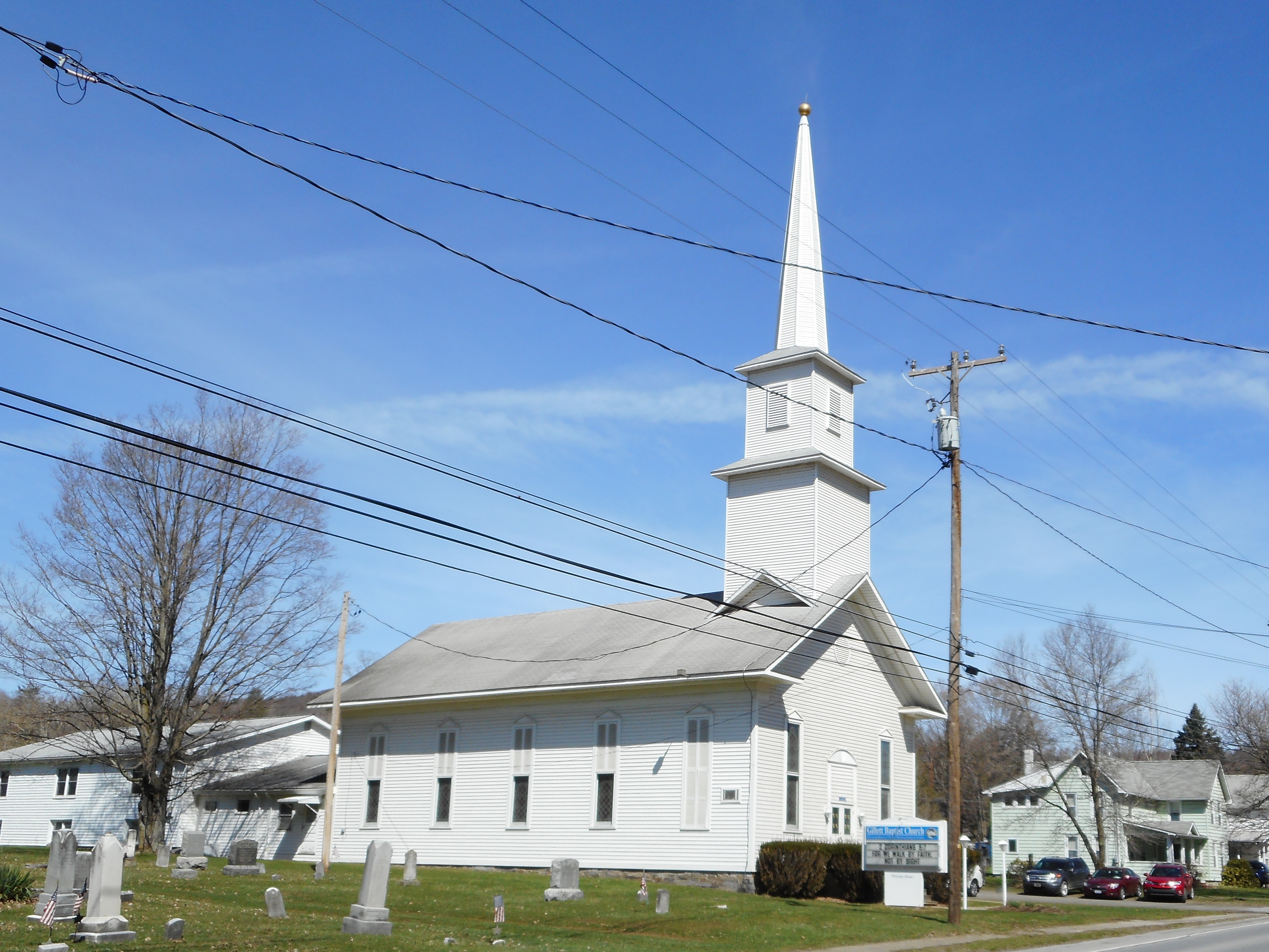
- Gillett Baptist Church
- Nickname: Gillett Pennsylvania
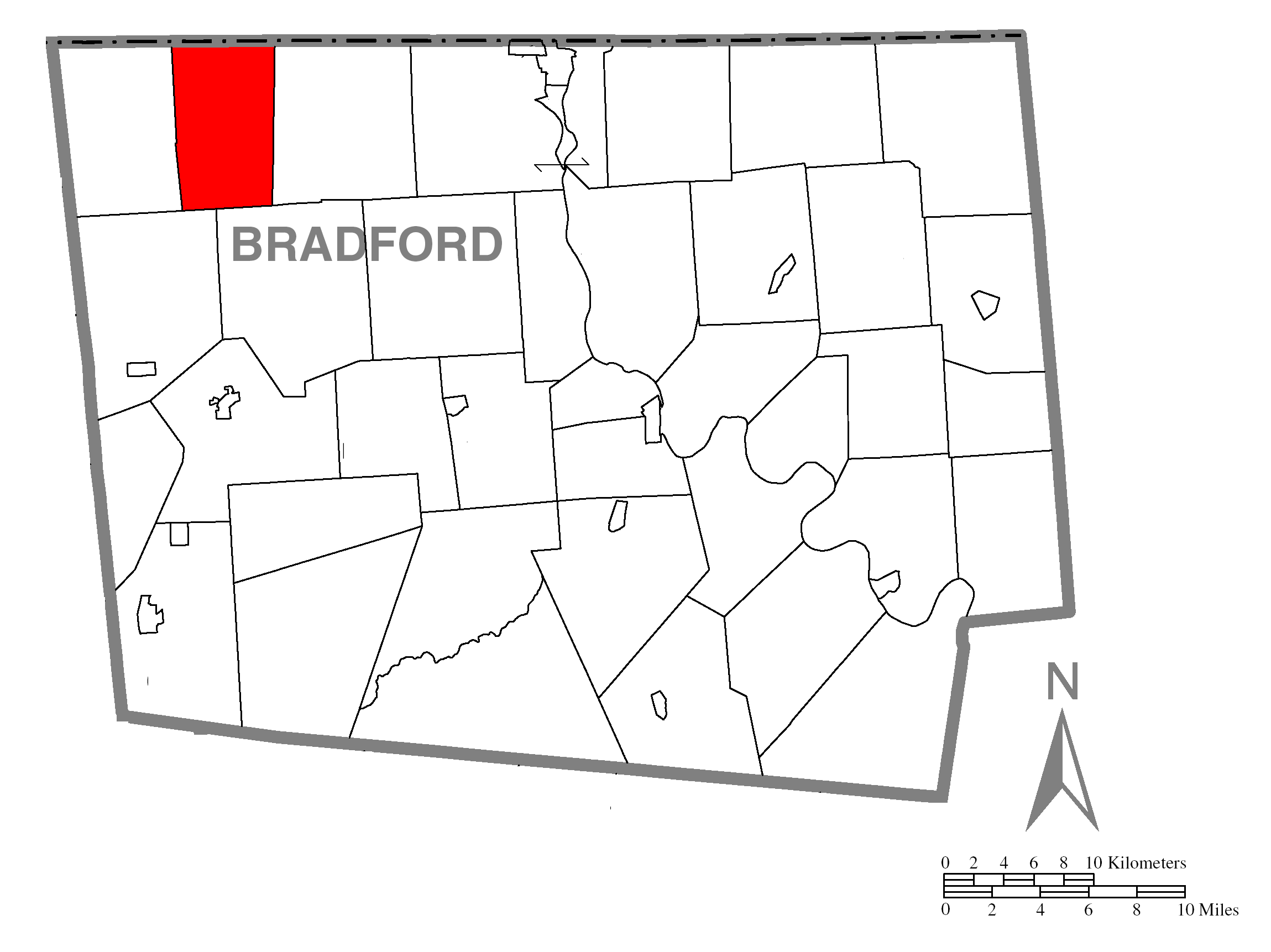
- Map of Bradford County with South Creek Township highlighted

- Map of Bradford County, Pennsylvania
- Country: United States
- State: Pennsylvania
- County: Bradford
- Settled: 1804
- Incorporated: 1835

Area
  - Total: 27.94 sq mi (72.36 km^{2})
  - Land: 27.91 sq mi (72.28 km^{2})
  - Water: 0.035 sq mi (0.09 km^{2})

Population (2020)
  - Total: 1,112 ▼
  - Estimate (2023): 1,112
  - Density: 39.2/sq mi (15.15/km^{2})
- FIPS code: 42-015-72096

South Creek Township is a township in Bradford County, Pennsylvania, United States. The population was 1,112 at the 2020 census. Children residing in the township are assigned to attend the Troy Area School District.

== Geography ==
South Creek Township is located in northwestern Bradford County, along the New York state line. It is bordered by Ridgebury Township to the east, Springfield and Columbia townships to the south, and Wells Township to the west. To the north, in Chemung County, New York, are the towns of Southport (northwest) and Ashland (northeast).

Pennsylvania Route 14 runs north–south the length of the township, following the valley of South Creek, a tributary (via Seeley Creek) of the Chemung River in New York, and thence to the Susquehanna River. Route 14 passes through the unincorporated communities of Dunning, Gillett, and Fassett within the township.

According to the United States Census Bureau, the township has a total area of 28.0 square miles (72.4 km^{2}), of which 27.9 square miles (72.3 km^{2}) is land and 0.04 square miles (0.1 km^{2}), or 0.12%, is water.

== Demographics ==
Historical population
Census	Pop.	Note	%±
2010	1,128		—
2020	1,112		−1.4%
2023 (est.)	1,112		0.0%
U.S. Decennial Census

As of the census of 2000, there were 1,261 people, 484 households, and 363 families residing in the township. The population density was 45.0 inhabitants per square mile (17.4/km^{2}). There were 559 housing units at an average density of 19.9/sq mi (7.7/km^{2}). The racial makeup of the township was 98.89% White, 0.56% African American, 0.16% Native American, 0.08% from other races, and 0.32% from two or more races. Hispanic or Latino of any race were 1.43% of the population.

There were 484 households, out of which 33.7% had children under the age of 18 living with them, 60.1% were married couples living together, 9.3% had a female householder with no husband present, and 24.8% were non-families. 21.5% of all households were made up of individuals, and 8.1% had someone living alone who was 65 years of age or older. The average household size was 2.58 and the average family size was 2.95.

In the township the population was spread out, with 26.5% under the age of 18, 5.8% from 18 to 24, 28.5% from 25 to 44, 25.1% from 45 to 64, and 14.1% who were 65 years of age or older. The median age was 38 years. For every 100 females, there were 95.8 males. For every 100 females age 18 and over, there were 100.2 males.

The median income for a household in the township was $31,793, and the median income for a family was $36,071. Males had a median income of $30,952 versus $18,750 for females. The per capita income for the township was $15,015. About 10.0% of families and 12.0% of the population were below the poverty line, including 19.3% of those under age 18 and 8.2% of those age 65 or over.

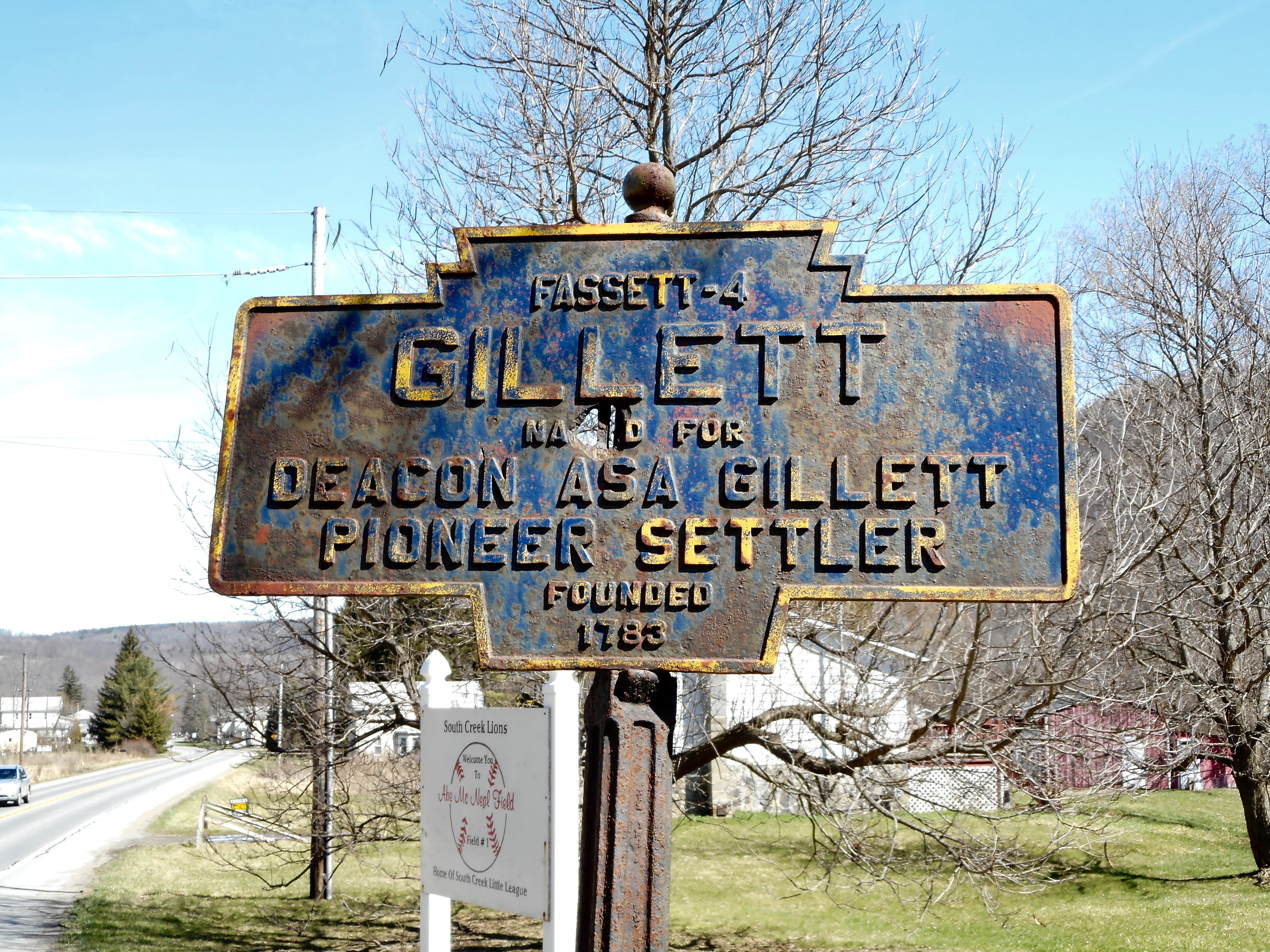
Gillett Keystone marker
