= Leland Justin Webb =

American politician (1846–1893)

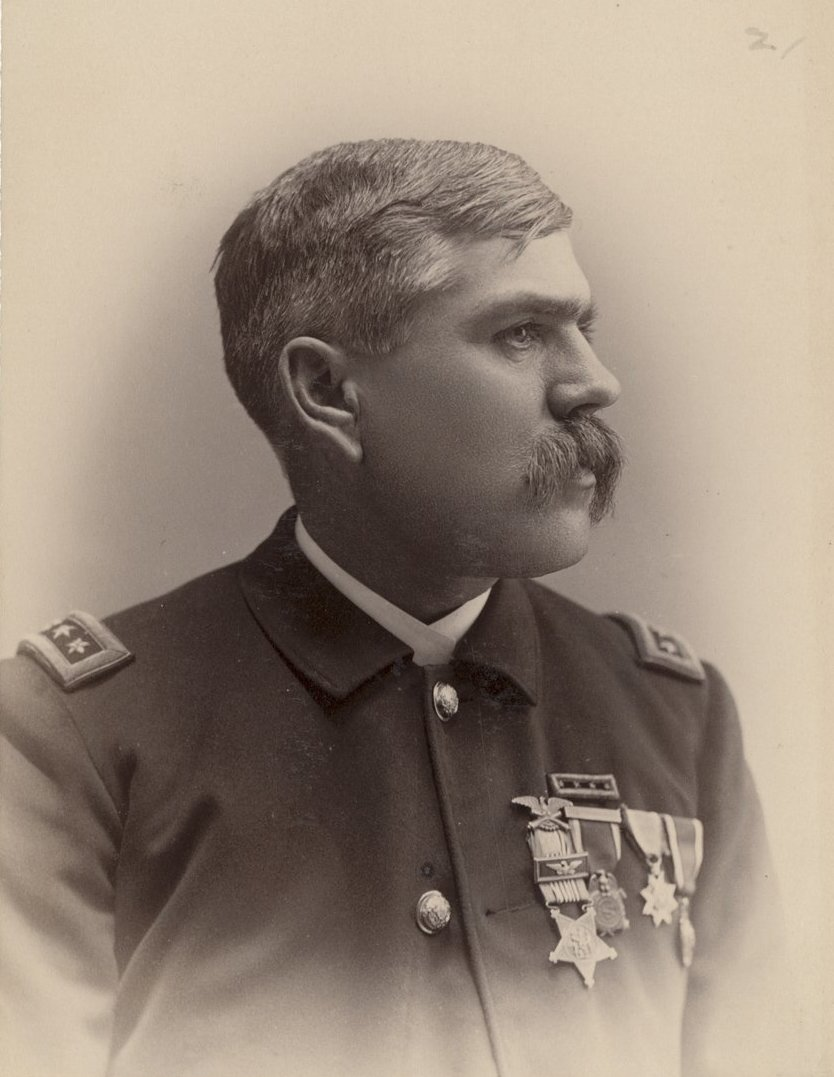
Leland J. Webb

Leland Justin Webb (August 5, 1846 – February 21, 1893) was an American lawyer and politician. His father was Colonel William C. Webb, a district attorney, judge and state assemblyman.

== Formative years ==
Born in Smithfield, Bradford County, Pennsylvania on August 5, 1846, Webb moved with his parents to Wautoma, Wisconsin in 1853.

During the American Civil War, at the age of fifteen, he enlisted as a drummer in Company H, 16th Wisconsin Infantry, on October 15, 1861, and was discharged on August 25, 1862. Returning to Wisconsin, he re-enlisted in Company I, 30th Wisconsin Infantry as a musician and was discharged on March 8, 1865. He served in several major engagements including Shiloh, Nashville and Corinth.

== Post-war life ==
In 1868, Webb moved to Fort Scott, Kansas where he joined the 19th Kansas Cavalry Regiment for service against hostile Indians. Webb was admitted to the Kansas bar in 1869. He, then, moved to Columbus, Kansas and served as the city's first mayor. In 1871, Webb moved to Winfield, Kansas. In 1877 and 1878, Webb served in the Kansas House of Representatives and was involved with the Republican Party.

Webb was a member of the Grand Army of the Republic and served as Commander-in-Chief of the Sons of Veterans from 1890 to 1891. He was a hereditary companion of the Military Order of the Loyal Legion of the United States by right of his father's service as a colonel in the Union Army during the Civil War.

In 1880, Webb moved to Topeka, Kansas and continued to practice law.

== Death ==
Webb died in Topeka on February 21, 1893.
