= Kansas District Courts =

The Kansas District Courts are the state trial courts of general jurisdiction in the U.S. state of Kansas. The Courts have original jurisdiction over all civil and criminal cases, and jury trials are held in the Courts. Among the cases litigated in the District Courts are domestic relations, lawsuits for damages, probate and administration of estates, legal guardianship, conservatorship, the mentally ill, juvenile justice, and small claims. It is here that the criminal and civil jury trials are held.

Kansas' 105 counties are organized into 31 judicial districts, each consisting of between one and seven counties, with a differing number of judges in each district.

== Counties ==
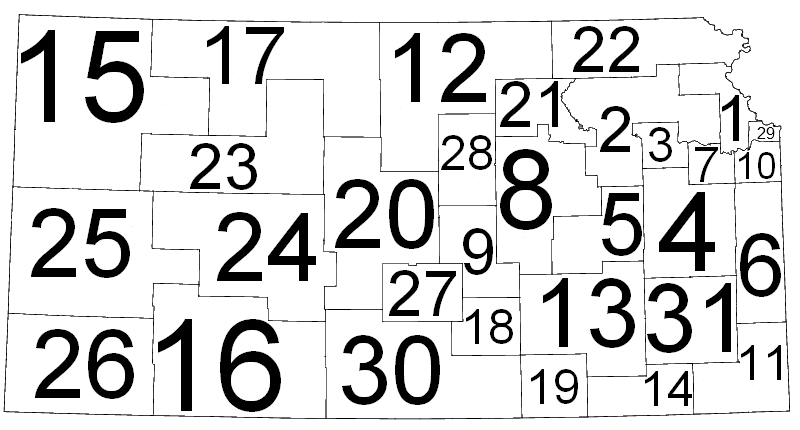
Districts map

- District 1 - Atchison, Leavenworth
- District 2 - Jackson, Jefferson, Pottawatomie, Wabaunsee
- District 3 - Shawnee
- District 4 - Anderson, Coffey, Franklin, Osage
- District 5 - Chase, Lyon
- District 6 - Bourbon, Linn, Miami
- District 7 - Douglas
- District 8 - Dickinson, Geary, Marion, Morris
- District 9 - Harvey, McPherson
- District 10 - Johnson
- District 11 - Cherokee, Crawford, Labette
- District 12 - Cloud, Jewell, Lincoln, Mitchell, Republic, Washington
- District 13 - Butler, Elk, Greenwood
- District 14 - Chautauqua, Montgomery
- District 15 - Cheyenne, Logan, Sheridan, Sherman, Rawlins, Thomas, Wallace
- District 16 - Clark, Comanche, Ford, Gray, Kiowa, Meade
- District 17 - Decatur, Graham, Norton, Osborne, Phillips, Smith
- District 18 - Sedgwick
- District 19 - Cowley
- District 20 - Barton, Ellsworth, Rice, Russell, Stafford
- District 21 - Clay, Riley
- District 22 - Brown, Doniphan, Marshall, Nemaha
- District 23 - Ellis, Gove, Rooks, Trego
- District 24 - Edwards, Hodgeman, Lane, Ness, Pawnee, Rush
- District 25 - Finney, Greeley, Hamilton, Kearny, Scott, Wichita
- District 26 - Grant, Haskell, Morton, Seward, Stanton, Stevens
- District 27 - Reno
- District 28 - Ottawa, Saline
- District 29 - Wyandotte
- District 30 - Barber, Harper, Kingman, Pratt, Sumner
- District 31 - Allen, Neosho, Wilson, Woodson

== See also ==
- Granville Pearl Aikman
