= Smithfield Township, Bradford County, Pennsylvania =

Township in Pennsylvania, US

Coordinates: 41°51′12″N 76°37′14″W

- Township
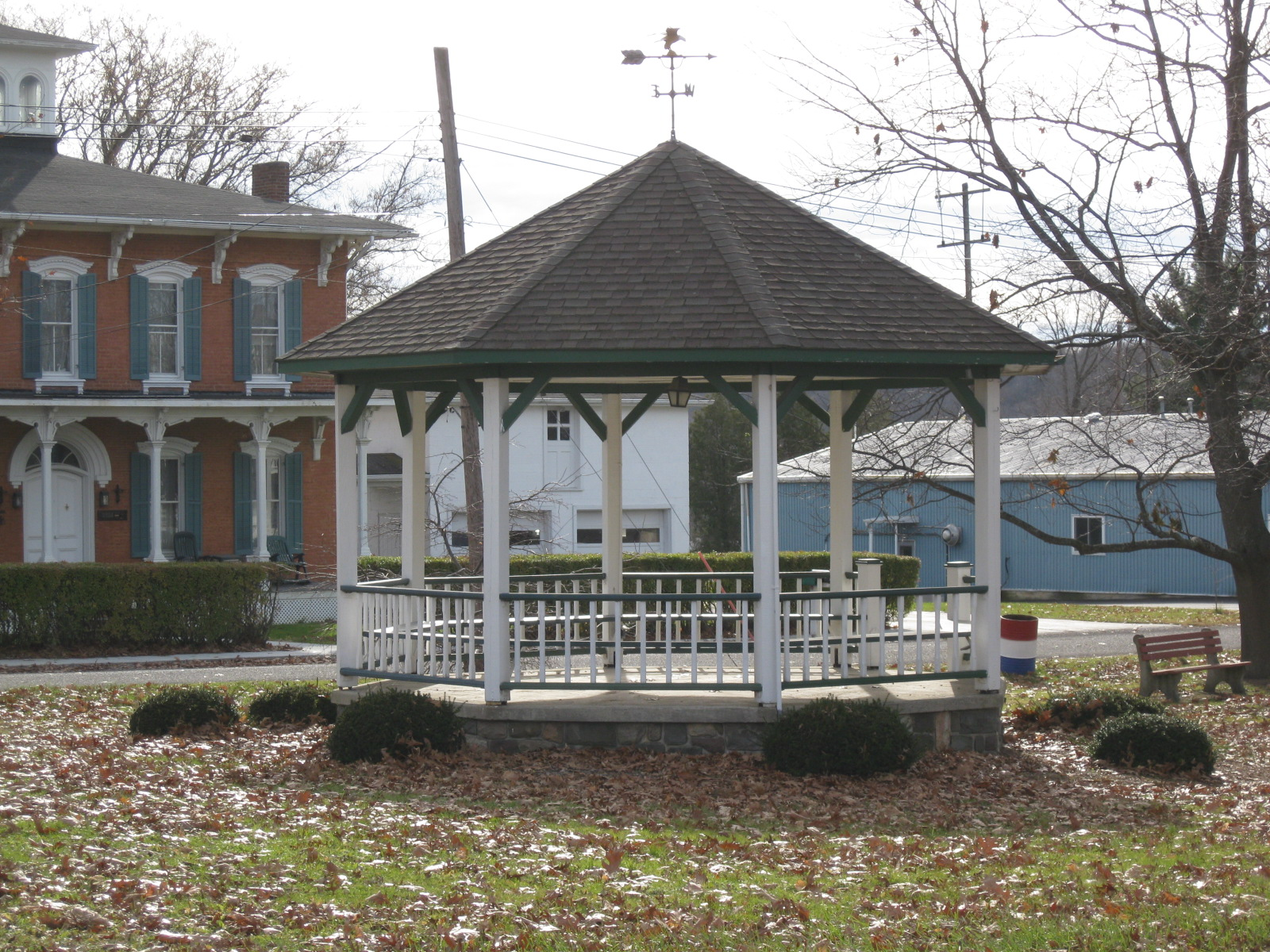
- East Smithfield, a village in Smithfield Township

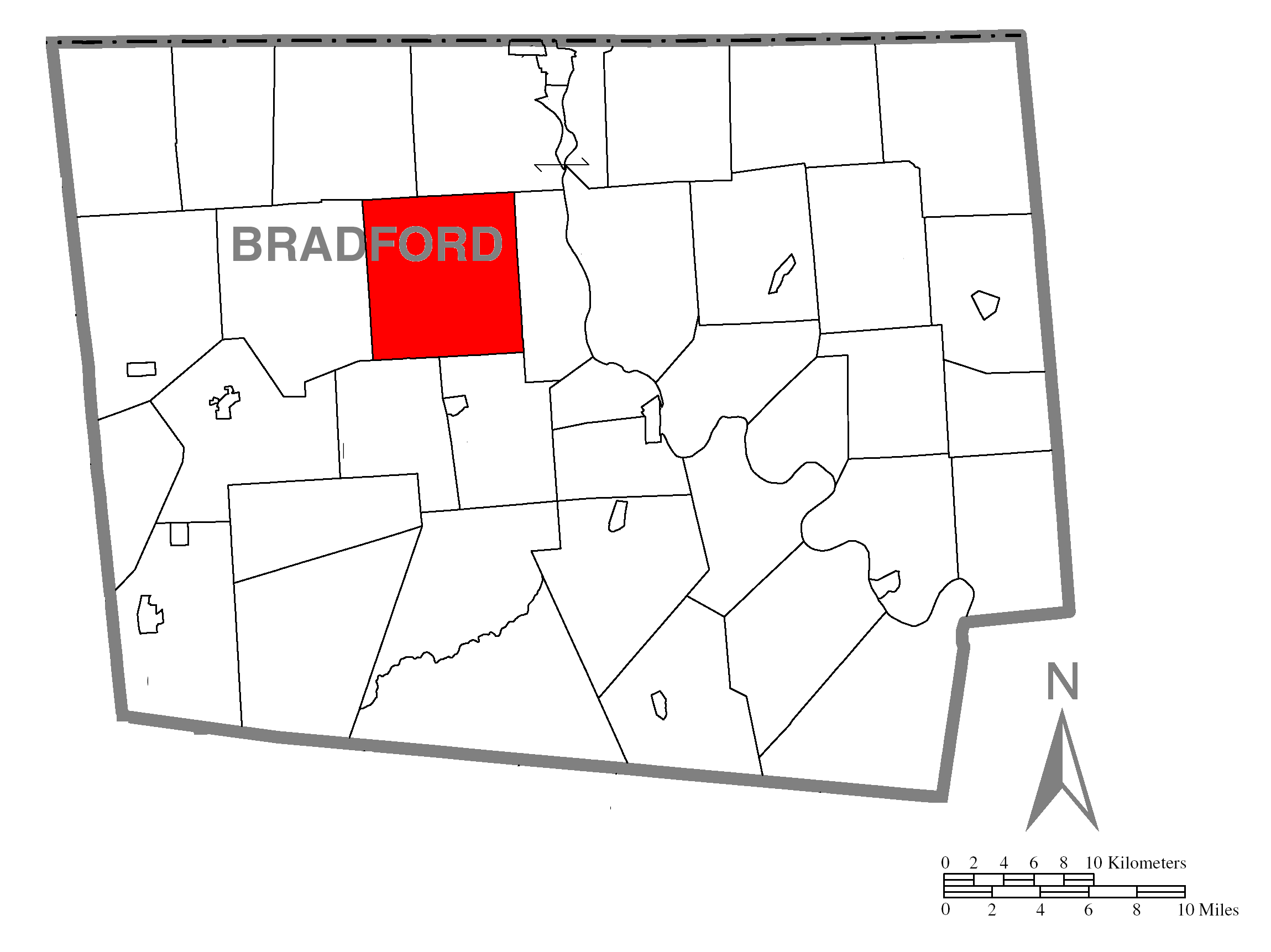
- Map of Bradford County with Smithfield Township highlighted

- Map of Bradford County, Pennsylvania
- Country: United States
- State: Pennsylvania
- County: Bradford
- Settled: 1792
- Incorporated: 1809

Area
  - Total: 42.05 sq mi (108.90 km^{2})
  - Land: 41.88 sq mi (108.47 km^{2})
  - Water: 0.17 sq mi (0.43 km^{2})

Population (2020)
  - Total: 1,457 ▼
  - Estimate (2023): 1,464
  - Density: 34.7/sq mi (13.41/km^{2})
- FIPS code: 42-015-71312
- Website: smithfieldtownshipbc.org

Smithfield Township is a township in Bradford County, Pennsylvania, United States. It is part of Northeastern Pennsylvania. The population was 1,457 at the 2020 census.

== Geography ==
Smithfield Township is in northwestern Bradford County and is bordered by Ridgebury and Athens townships to the north, Ulster Township to the east, Burlington and West Burlington townships to the south and Springfield Township to the west. The primary settlement is the unincorporated community of East Smithfield, located near the center of the township.

According to the United States Census Bureau, the township has a total area of 42.0 square miles (108.9 km^{2}), of which 41.9 square miles (108.5 km^{2}) is land and 0.15 square miles (0.4 km^{2}), or 0.39%, is water.

== Demographics ==
Historical population
Census	Pop.	Note	%±
2010	1,498		—
2020	1,457		−2.7%
2023 (est.)	1,464		0.5%
U.S. Decennial Census

As of the census of 2000, there were 1,538 people, 567 households, and 433 families residing in the township. The population density was 36.9 inhabitants per square mile (14.2/km^{2}). There were 649 housing units at an average density of 15.6/sq mi (6.0/km^{2}). The racial makeup of the township was 98.83% White, 0.91% African American, 0.13% Asian, and 0.13% from two or more races. Hispanic or Latino people of any race were 0.65% of the population.

There were 567 households, out of which 32.8% had children under the age of 18 living with them, 68.6% were married couples living together, 4.1% had a female householder with no husband present, and 23.5% were non-families. 19.6% of all households were made up of individuals, and 7.6% had someone living alone who was 65 years of age or older. The average household size was 2.71 and the average family size was 3.11.

In the township the population was spread out, with 26.5% under the age of 18, 4.9% from 18 to 24, 25.9% from 25 to 44, 27.6% from 45 to 64, and 15.1% who were 65 years of age or older. The median age was 40 years. For every 100 females, there were 98.7 males. For every 100 females age 18 and over, there were 96.2 males.

The median income for a household in the township was $36,500, and the median income for a family was $40,903. Males had a median income of $30,685 versus $21,625 for females. The per capita income for the township was $16,335. About 7.8% of families and 9.9% of the population were below the poverty line, including 14.6% of those under age 18 and 5.8% of those age 65 or over.
