= Ridgebury Township, Pennsylvania =

Township in Pennsylvania, US

Coordinates: 41°57′48″N 76°41′22″W

- Township
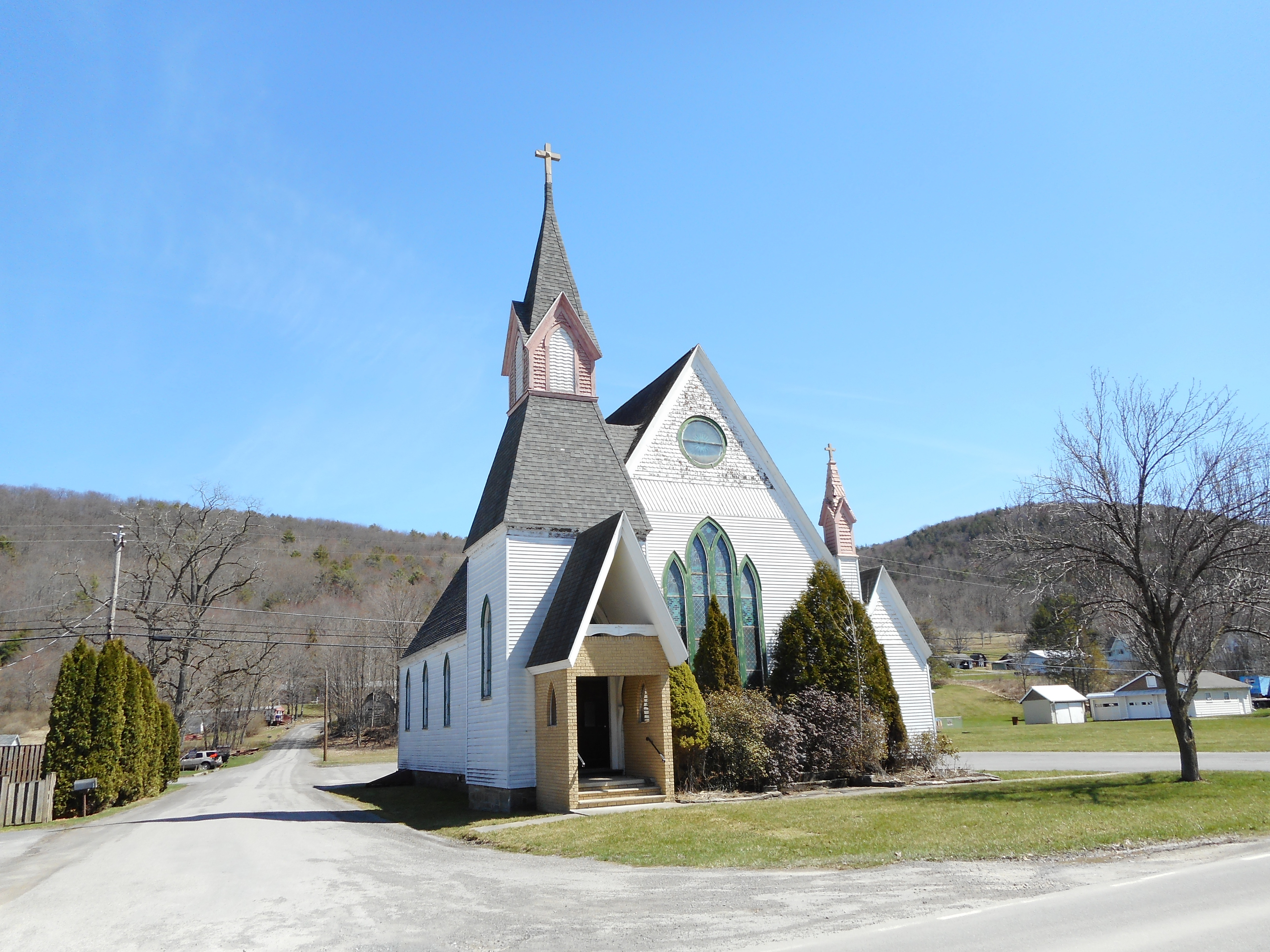
- Church in Bentley Creek

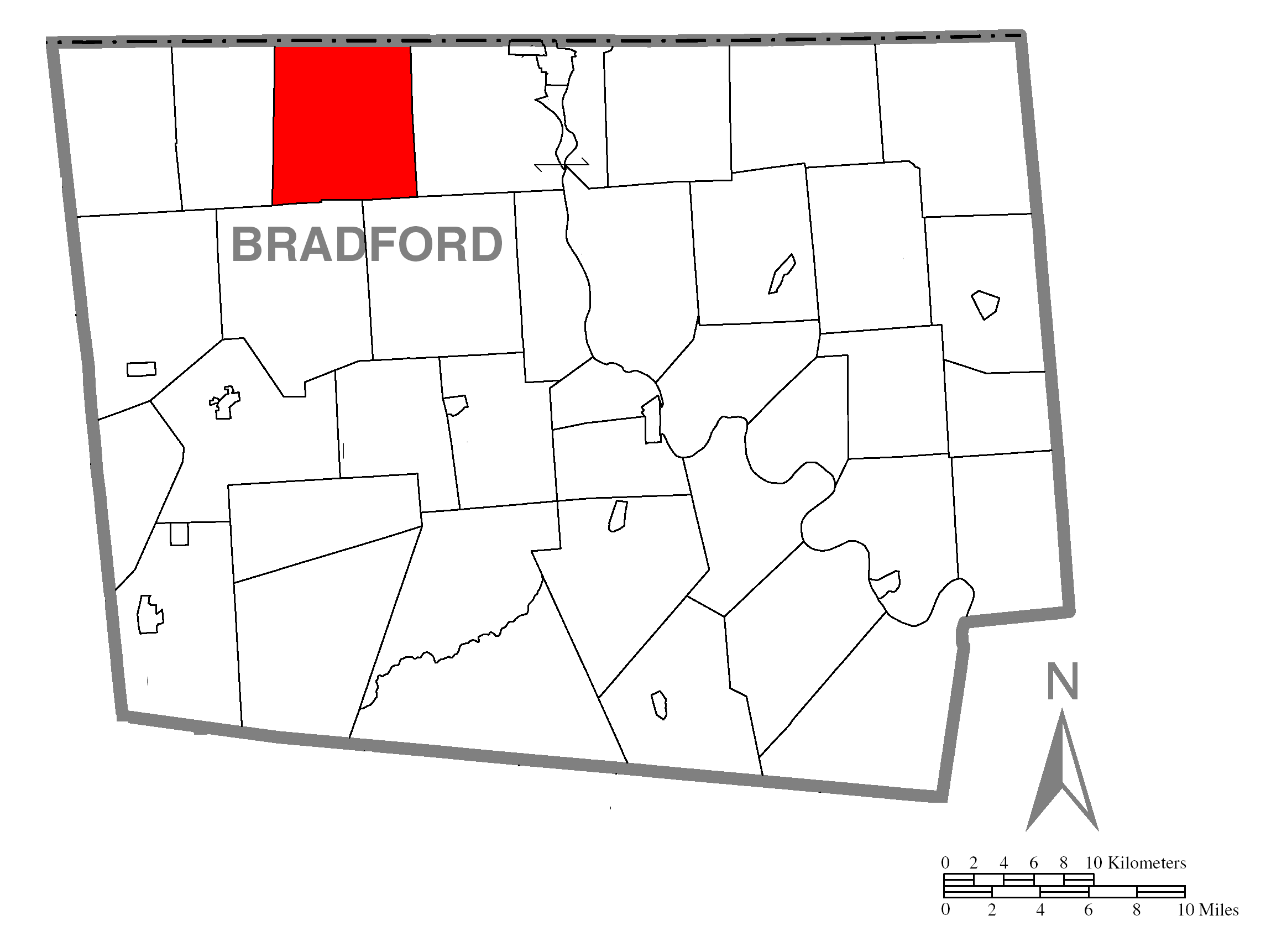
- Map of Bradford County with Ridgebury Township highlighted

- Map of Bradford County, Pennsylvania
- Country: United States
- State: Pennsylvania
- County: Bradford
- Settled: 1805
- Established: 1818

Government
  - Type: Board of Supervisors
  - Chairman: Gary L. Gee
  - Vice-chairman: Kevin E. Yaggie
  - Supervisor: John A. Johnson IV
  - Secretary /EMA: Tammi Talada
  - Treasurer: Kevin E. Yaggie

Area
  - Total: 38.50 sq mi (99.71 km^{2})
  - Land: 38.30 sq mi (99.20 km^{2})
  - Water: 0.20 sq mi (0.52 km^{2})

Population (2020)
  - Total: 1,905 ▼
  - Estimate (2023): 1,883
  - Density: 50.9/sq mi (19.64/km^{2})
- Zip code: 16925
- Area code: 570
- FIPS code: 42-015-64696
- Website: ridgeburytownship.com

Ridgebury Township is a township in Bradford County, Pennsylvania, United States. It is part of Northeastern Pennsylvania. The population was 1,978 at the 2010 census.

== History ==
The first settlers to Ridgebury Township were two families from Orange County, New York, who arrived in 1805. Ridgebury Township was established in 1818 from Athens and Wells townships. The name of the township came from Samuel Bennett, who named his farm "Ridgeberry" due to the berries that grew abundantly on the hillside.

== Geography ==
Ridgebury Township is located in northern Bradford County, along the New York state line. It is bordered by Athens Township to the east, Smithfield and Springfield townships to the south, and South Creek Township to the west. To the north, in Chemung County, New York, are the towns of Ashland (northwest) and Chemung (northeast). The village of Wellsburg, New York, in the town of Ashland, touches the border of Ridgebury Township.

Ridgebury Township includes the unincorporated communities of Ridgebury, Bentley Creek, and Middletown, all in the valley of Bentley Creek, which flows north to the Chemung River in New York state. According to the U.S. Census Bureau, the township has a total area of 38.5 square miles (99.7 km^{2}), of which 38.3 square miles (99.2 km^{2}) is land and 0.19 square miles (0.5 km^{2}), or 0.52%, is water.

== Demographics ==
Historical population
Census	Pop.	Note	%±
2010	1,978		—
2020	1,905		−3.7%
2023 (est.)	1,883		−1.2%
U.S. Decennial Census

As of the census of 2000, there were 1,982 people, 759 households, and 569 families residing in the township. The population density was 51.8 inhabitants per square mile (20.0/km^{2}). There were 954 housing units at an average density of 24.9/sq mi (9.6/km^{2}). The racial makeup of the township was 98.13% White, 0.55% African American, 0.25% Native American, 0.25% Asian, 0.15% from other races, and 0.66% from two or more races. Hispanic or Latino of any race were 0.20% of the population.

There were 759 households, out of which 32.7% had children under the age of 18 living with them, 63.4% were married couples living together, 7.2% had a female householder with no husband present, and 25.0% were non-families. 22.3% of all households were made up of individuals, and 8.4% had someone living alone who was 65 years of age or older. The average household size was 2.59 and the average family size was 2.96.

In the township the population was spread out, with 26.1% under the age of 18, 5.9% from 18 to 24, 27.7% from 25 to 44, 27.1% from 45 to 64, and 13.3% who were 65 years of age or older. The median age was 39 years. For every 100 females, there were 99.2 males. For every 100 females age 18 and over, there were 99.6 males.

The median income for a household in the township was $35,573, and the median income for a family was $40,144. Males had a median income of $32,404 versus $22,727 for females. The per capita income for the township was $15,901. About 9.8% of families and 14.0% of the population were below the poverty line, including 20.6% of those under age 18 and 3.2% of those age 65 or over.
