= List of places in Pennsylvania: Sk–Sy =

This list of cities, towns, unincorporated communities, counties, and other recognized places in the U.S. state of Pennsylvania also includes information on the number and names of counties in which the place lies, and its lower and upper zip code bounds, if applicable.

Name of place	Number of counties	Principal county	Lower zip code	Upper zip code
Skelp	1	Blair County	16601	
Skeltontown	1	Crawford County		
Skidmore	1	Lawrence County	16101	
Skinners Eddy	1	Wyoming County	18623	
Skippack	1	Montgomery County	19474	
Skippack Township	1	Montgomery County		
Skyline Heights	1	York County	17402	
Skyline View	1	Dauphin County	17112	
Skytop	1	Monroe County	18357	
Slab	1	York County		
Slabtown	1	Armstrong County		
Slabtown	1	Clearfield County	15724	
Slabtown	1	Columbia County		
Slabtown	1	Franklin County	17368	
Slackwater	1	Lancaster County	17551	
Slate Hill	1	York County	17314	
Slate Lick	1	Armstrong County	16229	
Slate Ridge	1	Adams County		
Slate Run	1	Lycoming County	17769	
Slate Valley	1	Northampton County	18038	
Slatedale	1	Lehigh County	18079	
Slatefield	1	Northampton County	18038	
Slateford	1	Northampton County	18343	
Slateville	1	Lehigh County	19529	
Slatington	1	Lehigh County	18080	
Slickport	1	Cambria County	16646	
Slickville	1	Westmoreland County	15684	
Sligo	1	Allegheny County	15065	
Sligo	1	Clarion County	16255	
Slippery Rock	1	Butler County	16057	
Slippery Rock Park	1	Butler County	16057	
Slippery Rock Township	1	Butler County		
Slippery Rock Township	1	Lawrence County		
Slocum	1	Luzerne County		
Slocum Corners	1	Luzerne County	18660	
Slocum Township	1	Luzerne County		
Slonaker	1	Chester County		
Slovan	1	Washington County	15078	
Smallwood	1	Washington County	15423	
Smeltzer	1	Armstrong County		
Smethport	1	McKean County	16749	
Smicksburg	1	Indiana County	16256	
Smiley	1	Fayette County	15401	
Smiley	1	Susquehanna County		
Smith	1	Indiana County		
Smith Bridge	1	Greene County	15380	
Smith Corners	1	Venango County		
Smith Gap	1	Monroe County		
Smith Gardens	1	York County	17345	
Smith Summit	1	Jefferson County		
Smith Township	1	Washington County		
Smithdale	1	Allegheny County	15089	
Smithfield	1	Fayette County	15478	
Smithfield	1	Huntingdon County	16652	
Smithfield Center	1	Huntingdon County	16652	
Smithfield Township	1	Bradford County		
Smithfield Township	1	Huntingdon County		
Smithfield Township	1	Monroe County		
Smithland	1	Clarion County	16242	
Smithmill	1	Clearfield County	16680	
Smithport	1	Indiana County	15742	
Smiths	1	York County	17362	
Smiths Corner	1	Bucks County	18950	
Smiths Ferry	1	Beaver County	15059	
Smiths Station	1	York County		
Smithton	1	Westmoreland County	15479	
Smithtown	1	Bucks County	18947	
Smithtown	1	Jefferson County	15840	
Smithville	1	Lancaster County	17560	
Smock	1	Fayette County	15480	
Smoke Run	1	Clearfield County		
Smokeless	1	Indiana County	15944	
Smokerun	1	Clearfield County	16681	
Smoketown	1	Bucks County	18951	
Smoketown	1	Franklin County	17201	
Smoketown	1	Lancaster County	17576	
Smoketown	1	Northampton County		
Smullton	1	Centre County	16854	
Smyerstown	1	Indiana County	15772	
Smyrna	1	Lancaster County	17509	
Smyser	1	York County		
Snake Spring Township	1	Bedford County		
Snedekerville	1	Bradford County	16914	
Snively Corners	1	Clarion County	16232	
Snow Shoe	1	Centre County	16874	
Snow Shoe Township	1	Centre County		
Snowball Gate	1	Bucks County	19058	
Snowden	1	Allegheny County	15129	
Snowden Township	1	Allegheny County		
Snowdenville	1	Chester County	19475	
Snows Mill	1	Susquehanna County		
S.N.P.J.	1	Lawrence County	16120	
Snyder Corner	1	York County	17356	
Snyder Township	1	Blair County		
Snyder Township	1	Jefferson County		
Snyders	1	Schuylkill County	17960	
Snydersburg	1	Clarion County	16257	
Snydersville	1	Monroe County	18360	
Snydertown	1	Centre County	16841	
Snydertown	1	Fayette County	15425	
Snydertown	1	Huntingdon County		
Snydertown	1	Northumberland County	17877	
Snydertown	1	Westmoreland County	15620	
Snyderville	1	Armstrong County	16222	
Sober	1	Centre County	16875	
Social Island	1	Franklin County		
Soho	1	Allegheny County		
Soldier	1	Jefferson County	15851	
Solebury	1	Bucks County	18963	
Solebury Township	1	Bucks County		
Solebury Village	1	Bucks County		
Solomon Gap	1	Luzerne County	18707	
Somerfield	1	Somerset County		
Somers	1	Westmoreland County		
Somers Lane	1	Tioga County	16929	
Somerset	1	Somerset County	15501	
Somerset Township	1	Somerset County		
Somerset Township	1	Washington County		
Somerton	1	Philadelphia County	19116	
Somerville	1	Armstrong County	16028	
Sonestown	1	Sullivan County	17770	
Sonman	1	Cambria County	15946	
Sopertown	1	Bradford County		
Soradoville	1	Mifflin County	17841	
Soudersburg	1	Lancaster County	17577	
Souderton	1	Montgomery County	18964	
Soukesburg	1	Cambria County	15956	
South Abington Township	1	Lackawanna County		
South Altoona	1	Blair County		
South Annville Township	1	Lebanon County		
South Ardmore	1	Delaware County	19083	
South Auburn	1	Susquehanna County	18630	
South Beaver Township	1	Beaver County		
South Bend	1	Armstrong County	15774	
South Bend Township	1	Armstrong County		
South Bethlehem	1	Armstrong County	16242	
South Bradford	1	McKean County	16701	
South Branch	1	Bradford County		
South Brownsville	1	Fayette County		
South Buffalo Township	1	Armstrong County		
South Burgettstown	1	Washington County	15021	
South Canaan	1	Wayne County	18459	
South Canaan Township	1	Wayne County		
South Carnegie	1	Allegheny County	15106	
South Centre Township	1	Columbia County		
South Chester	1	Delaware County		
South Clarksville	1	Greene County	15322	
South Clearfield	1	Clearfield County	16830	
South Coatesville	1	Chester County	19320	
South Connellsville	1	Fayette County	15425	
South Coventry Township	1	Chester County		
South Creek Township	1	Bradford County		
South Danville	1	Northumberland County		
South Duquesne	1	Allegheny County	15110	
South Easton	1	Northampton County	18042	
South Eaton	1	Wyoming County	18657	
South Enola	1	Cumberland County	17025	
South Erie	1	Erie County	16508	
South Fayette Township	1	Allegheny County		
South Fork	1	Cambria County	15956	
South Franklin Township	1	Washington County		
South Gibson	1	Susquehanna County	18842	
South Greensburg	1	Westmoreland County	15601	
South Hanover Township	1	Dauphin County		
South Heidelberg Township	1	Berks County		
South Heights	1	Beaver County	15081	
South Hermitage	1	Lancaster County	17555	
South Hill	1	Bradford County		
South Hills	1	Allegheny County	15216	
South Huntingdon	1	Huntingdon County		
South Huntingdon Township	1	Westmoreland County		
South Lakemont	1	Blair County	16602	
South Langhorne	1	Bucks County		
South Lebanon Township	1	Lebanon County		
South Londonderry Township	1	Lebanon County		
South Mahoning Township	1	Indiana County		
South Manheim Township	1	Schuylkill County		
South Meadville	1	Crawford County	16335	
South Media	1	Delaware County	19063	
South Middleton Township	1	Cumberland County		
South Montrose	1	Susquehanna County	18843	
South Mountain	1	Berks County		
South Mountain	1	Franklin County	17261	
South New Castle	1	Lawrence County	16101	
South Newton Township	1	Cumberland County		
South Oil City	1	Venango County	16301	
South Park Township	1	Allegheny County		
South Perkasie	1	Bucks County	18944	
South Philipsburg	1	Centre County	16866	
South Pottstown	1	Chester County	19464	
South Pymatuning Township	1	Mercer County		
South Renovo	1	Clinton County	17764	
South Rockwood	1	Somerset County		
South Shenango Township	1	Crawford County		
South Side	1	Allegheny County		
South Side	1	Lackawanna County	18505	
South Sterling	1	Wayne County	18460	
South Strabane	1	Washington County		
South Strabane Township	1	Washington County		
South Tamaqua	1	Schuylkill County	18252	
South Temple	1	Berks County	19560	
South Terrace	1	Northampton County		
South Towanda	1	Bradford County	18848	
South Union	1	Tioga County		
South Union Township	1	Fayette County		
South Uniontown	1	Fayette County	15401	
South Versailles Township	1	Allegheny County		
South Warren	1	Bradford County		
South Waverly	1	Bradford County	14892	
South Whitehall Township	1	Lehigh County		
South Wilkes-Barre	1	Luzerne County		
South Williamsport	1	Lycoming County	17701	
South Woodbury Township	1	Bedford County		
Southampton	1	Bucks County	18966	
Southampton Township	1	Bedford County		
Southampton Township	1	Cumberland County		
Southampton Township	1	Franklin County		
Southampton Township	1	Somerset County		
Southdale	1	Luzerne County	18655	
Southeastern	1	Chester County	19399	
Southeastern Facility	1	Chester County	19397	98
Southerwood	1	Westmoreland County	15610	
Southmont	1	Cambria County	15905	
Southpointe	1	Washington County		
Southside	1	Northampton County	18015	
Southside	1	York County		
Southview	1	Washington County	15361	
Southwark	1	Philadelphia County	19147	
Southwest	1	Westmoreland County	15685	
Southwest Greensburg	1	Westmoreland County	15601	
Southwest Madison Township	1	Perry County		
Southwest Township	1	Warren County		
Southwood Hills	1	York County	17403	
Sowash	1	Westmoreland County		
Spaces Corners	1	Armstrong County		
Spaces Corners	1	Clarion County		
Spangler	1	Cambria County	15775	
Spangsville	1	Berks County	19512	
Sparta	1	Washington County	15329	
Sparta Township	1	Crawford County		
Spartansburg	1	Crawford County	16434	
Spears Grove	1	Juniata County	17021	
Spechty Kopf	1	Dauphin County		
Speeceville	1	Dauphin County		
Speedwell	1	Lancaster County	17543	
Speers	1	Washington County	15012	
Spencers Corners	1	Lackawanna County		
Spencertown	1	Tioga County		
Spike Island	1	Centre County	16666	
Spike Island	1	Lackawanna County	18507	
Split Rock	1	Carbon County		
Spindletown	1	Jefferson County		
Spindley City	1	Cambria County	16641	
Spinnerstown	1	Bucks County	18968	
Split Rock	1	Carbon County	18624	
Sporting Hill	1	Cumberland County	17055	
Sporting Hill	1	Lancaster County	17545	
Sportsburg	1	Jefferson County	15767	
Spraggs	1	Greene County	15362	
Sprankle Mills	1	Jefferson County	15776	
Spring Bank	1	Centre County	16854	
Spring Brook	1	Lackawanna County		
Spring Brook Township	1	Lackawanna County		
Spring Church	1	Armstrong County	15686	
Spring City	1	Chester County	19475	
Spring Creek	1	Lehigh County	18011	
Spring Creek	1	Warren County	16436	
Spring Creek Township	1	Elk County		
Spring Creek Township	1	Warren County		
Spring Garden	1	Allegheny County		
Spring Garden	1	Bucks County	18940	
Spring Garden	1	Lancaster County	17535	
Spring Garden	1	Philadelphia County	19122	
Spring Garden	1	Schuylkill County	17972	
Spring Garden	1	Union County	17810	
Spring Garden	1	Westmoreland County	15666	
Spring Garden	1	York County	17403	
Spring Garden Township	1	York County		
Spring Glen	1	Schuylkill County	17978	
Spring Grove	1	York County	17362	
Spring Hill	1	Allegheny County		
Spring Hill	1	Bradford County	18853	
Spring Hill	1	Cambria County	15946	
Spring Hill	1	Delaware County	19018	
Spring House	1	Montgomery County	19477	
Spring Meadow	1	Bedford County		
Spring Mill	1	Montgomery County	19428	
Spring Mills	1	Centre County	16875	
Spring Mount	1	Huntingdon County	16877	
Spring Mount	1	Montgomery County	19478	
Spring Plains	1	York County		
Spring Ridge	1	Berks County		
Spring Run	1	Franklin County	17262	
Spring Township	1	Berks County		
Spring Township	1	Centre County		
Spring Township	1	Crawford County		
Spring Township	1	Perry County		
Spring Township	1	Snyder County		
Spring Valley	1	Berks County	19560	
Spring Valley	1	Bucks County	18901	
Spring Valley	1	Clearfield County	16878	
Spring Valley	1	Northampton County	18015	
Spring Valley Estates	1	Franklin County	17201	
Springboro	1	Crawford County	16435	
Springdale	1	Allegheny County	15144	
Springdale	1	York County		
Springdale Township	1	Allegheny County		
Springdell	1	Chester County	19320	
Springetts Manor-Yorklyn	1	York County		
Springettsbury Township	1	York County		
Springfield	1	Bradford County	16914	
Springfield	1	Cumberland County	17241	
Springfield	1	Delaware County	19064	
Springfield	1	Erie County		
Springfield Falls	1	Mercer County		
Springfield Junction	1	Blair County		
Springfield Park	1	Delaware County	19064	
Springfield Township	1	Bradford County		
Springfield Township	1	Bucks County		
Springfield Township	1	Delaware County		
Springfield Township	1	Erie County		
Springfield Township	1	Fayette County		
Springfield Township	1	Huntingdon County		
Springfield Township	1	Mercer County		
Springfield Township	1	Montgomery County		
Springfield Township	1	York County		
Springhaven	1	Lebanon County		
Springhaven Estates	1	Delaware County	19086	
Springhill Township	1	Fayette County		
Springhill Township	1	Greene County		
Springhope	1	Bedford County	15559	
Springlawn	1	Chester County		
Springmont	1	Berks County	19609	
Springs	1	Somerset County	15562	
Springton	1	Chester County		
Springtown	1	Bucks County	18081	
Springtown	1	Franklin County	17221	
Springtown	1	Luzerne County	18707	
Springtown	1	Northumberland County	17777	
Springvale	1	York County	17356	
Springville	1	Cumberland County	17007	
Springville	1	Lancaster County	17535	
Springville	1	Susquehanna County	18844	
Springville	1	Venango County	16342	
Springville Township	1	Susquehanna County		
Sproul	1	Blair County	16682	
Spruce	1	Clinton County		
Spruce	1	Huntingdon County		
Spruce	1	Indiana County		
Spruce Creek	1	Huntingdon County	16683	
Spruce Creek Township	1	Huntingdon County		
Spruce Grove	1	Lancaster County		
Spruce Hill	1	Juniata County	17082	
Spruce Hill Township	1	Juniata County		
Spruces	1	Chester County		
Sprucetown	1	Fayette County	15474	
Spry	1	York County	17402	
Squab Hollow	1	Elk County		
Square Corner	1	Adams County	17325	
Squirrel Hill	1	Allegheny County	15217	
Squirrel Hill	1	Clarion County		
Staab	1	Clarion County		
Stacktown	1	Lancaster County	17502	
Stafore Estates	1	Northampton County	18017	
Stahlstown	1	Westmoreland County	15687	
Stairville	1	Luzerne County	18660	
Stalker	1	Wayne County	12741	
Stambaugh	1	Fayette County	15456	
Standard	1	Westmoreland County	15666	
Standard Shaft	1	Westmoreland County	15666	
Standing Stone	1	Bradford County	18854	
Standing Stone Township	1	Bradford County		
Stanfordville	1	Susquehanna County		
Stanhope	1	Schuylkill County	17963	
Stanley	1	Clearfield County	15801	
Stanleys Corner	1	Venango County		
Stanton	1	Jefferson County	15825	
Stanton	1	Luzerne County		
Stanton Heights	1	Allegheny County		
Stanton Heights	1	Westmoreland County	15672	
Stanwood	1	Bucks County		
Stanwood Gardens	1	Bucks County	19020	
Star Junction	1	Fayette County	15482	
Star Village	1	Northampton County		
Starbrick	1	Warren County	16365	
Starford	1	Indiana County	15777	
Starks	1	Lackawanna County	18507	
Starkville	1	Wyoming County	18446	
Starlight	1	Wayne County	18461	
Starners	1	Cumberland County		
Starners Station	1	Cumberland County	17324	
Starr	1	Forest County	16353	
Starr	1	Warren County	16420	
Starrucca	1	Susquehanna County		
Starrucca	1	Wayne County	18462	
Starview	1	York County	17347	
Starview-Waterford	1	York County		
State College	1	Centre County	16801	05
State Hill	1	Berks County	19608	
State Hill	1	Chester County	17527	
State Line	1	Bedford County	15545	
State Line	1	Erie County	16428	
State Line	1	Franklin County	17263	
Steam Valley	1	Lycoming County		
Steamburg	1	Crawford County	16424	
Steel City	1	Northampton County	18015	
Steelstown	1	Lebanon County	17003	
Steelton	1	Dauphin County	17113	
Steelville	1	Chester County	19370	
Steene	1	Wayne County	18472	
Steffins Hill	1	Beaver County	15010	
Steins	1	Schuylkill County		
Steinsburg	1	Bucks County	18951	
Steinsville	1	Lehigh County	19529	
Stemlersville	1	Carbon County	18235	
Stenton	1	Philadelphia County		
Sterling	1	Clearfield County	16651	
Sterling	1	Wayne County	18463	
Sterling Run	1	Cameron County	15832	
Sterling Township	1	Wayne County		
Sterlingworth	1	Lehigh County	18104	
Sterrettania	1	Erie County	16415	
Stetlersville	1	Lehigh County		
Steuben	1	Lycoming County		
Steuben	1	Northampton County		
Steuben Township	1	Crawford County		
Stevens	1	Lancaster County	17578	
Stevens Point	1	Susquehanna County	18847	
Stevens Township	1	Bradford County		
Stevenson	1	Bradford County		
Stevenstown	1	York County	17019	
Stevensville	1	Bradford County	18845	
Stewardson Township	1	Potter County		
Stewart Run	1	Forest County	16341	
Stewart Township	1	Fayette County		
Stewarton	1	Fayette County		
Stewartstown	1	York County	17363	
Stewartsville	1	Westmoreland County	15642	
Stewartville	1	Crawford County		
Stickel	1	Fayette County		
Stickney	1	McKean County	16701	
Sticks	1	York County	17329	
Stier	1	Northampton County	18013	
Stifflertown	1	Clearfield County	15724	
Stiles	1	Lehigh County	18052	
Still Creek	1	Schuylkill County	18252	
Stilleys Siding	1	Allegheny County	15025	
Stillwater	1	Columbia County	17878	
Stillwater Lake Estates	1	Monroe County	18346	
Stiltz	1	York County	17327	
Stines Corner	1	Lehigh County	18066	
Stobo	1	Beaver County	15061	
Stockdale	1	Washington County	15483	
Stockertown	1	Northampton County	18083	
Stockport	1	Wayne County		
Stockton	1	Luzerne County	18201	
Stockton Number 6	1	Luzerne County	18201	
Stockton Number 7	1	Luzerne County	18201	
Stockton Number 8	1	Luzerne County	18201	
Stoddartsville	2	Luzerne County	18610	
Stoddartsville	2	Monroe County	18610	
Stokesdale	1	Tioga County	16901	
Stone Church	1	Northampton County	18343	
Stone Glen	1	Dauphin County	17018	
Stone Hill	1	Lancaster County	17516	
Stone House	1	Clarion County		
Stone Row	1	Bedford County	16650	
Stoneboro	1	Mercer County	16153	
Stonedale	1	Allegheny County		
Stoneham	1	Warren County	16313	
Stonehurst	1	Bucks County	18966	
Stonehurst	1	Delaware County	19082	
Stonehurst Hills	1	Delaware County	19082	
Stonemont	1	Schuylkill County		
Stoner	1	York County		
Stonerstown	1	Bedford County	16678	
Stonersville	1	Berks County	19508	
Stonerville	1	Fayette County		
Stonetown	1	Berks County	19508	
Stonevilla	1	Westmoreland County	15601	
Stoneybreak	1	Fulton County	17267	
Stonington	1	Northumberland County	17801	
Stony Creek	1	Schuylkill County		
Stony Creek Mills	1	Berks County	19606	
Stony Fork	1	Tioga County	16901	
Stony Point	1	Berks County		
Stony Point	1	Bucks County	18930	
Stony Point	1	Crawford County	16316	
Stony Point	1	Franklin County	17262	
Stony Point	1	Greene County	15344	
Stony Point	1	Perry County	17047	
Stony Run	1	Berks County	19557	
Stony Run	1	Juniata County		
Stonybreak	1	Fulton County	17267	
Stonybrook	1	Bucks County		
Stonybrook	1	York County	17402	
Stonybrook Heights	1	York County	17402	
Stonybrook-Wilshire	1	York County		
Stonycreek	1	Cambria County	15906	
Stonycreek Township	1	Cambria County		
Stonycreek Township	1	Somerset County		
Stoopville	1	Bucks County	18940	
Storage	1	Allegheny County		
Stormstown	1	Centre County	16870	
Stormville	1	Monroe County	18360	
Stottsville	1	Chester County	19367	
Stouchsburg	1	Berks County	19567	
Stoufferstown	1	Franklin County	17201	
Stoughstown	1	Cumberland County	17257	
Stoughton	1	Somerset County		
Stouts	1	Northampton County		
Stover	1	Huntingdon County	16686	
Stoverdale	1	Dauphin County	17036	
Stovers Mill	1	Clarion County		
Stoverstown	1	York County	17362	
Stowe	1	Allegheny County	15136	
Stowe	1	Montgomery County	19464	
Stowe Township	1	Allegheny County		
Stowell	1	Wyoming County	18623	
Stoyestown	1	Somerset County		
Stoystown	1	Somerset County	15563	
Straban Township	1	Adams County		
Strabane	1	Washington County	15363	
Strafford	1	Chester County	19087	
Straight Creek	1	Elk County		
Strangford	1	Indiana County	15717	
Strasburg	1	Lancaster County	17579	
Strasburg Township	1	Lancaster County		
Strattanville	1	Clarion County	16258	
Strattonville	1	Clarion County		
Strausstown	1	Berks County	19559	
Straw Pump	1	Westmoreland County	15642	
Strawberry Ridge	1	Montour County	17821	
Strawbridge	1	Lycoming County	17758	
Strawntown	1	Bucks County		
Street Road	1	Bucks County		
Streights	1	Elk County		
Stremmels	1	Adams County	17325	
Strickersville	1	Chester County	19711	
Strickhousers	1	York County	17360	
Strickler	1	York County		
Stricklerstown	1	Lebanon County	17073	
Strinestown	1	York County	17345	
Stringtown	1	Armstrong County	16226	
Stringtown	1	Bedford County		
Stringtown	1	Greene County	15320	
Strobleton	1	Clarion County	16353	
Strodes Mills	1	Mifflin County	17044	
Stronach	1	Clearfield County	16833	
Strong	1	Northumberland County	17851	
Strongstown	1	Indiana County	15957	
Stroud Township	1	Monroe County		
Stroudsburg	1	Monroe County	18360	
Stroudsburg West	1	Monroe County	18360	
Struble	1	Centre County		
Strum	1	Fayette County	15478	
Studa	1	Washington County	15312	
Stull	1	Wyoming County	18636	
Stump Creek	1	Jefferson County	15863	
Stumptown	1	Clearfield County	16666	
Stumptown	1	Lancaster County		
Sturgeon	1	Allegheny County	15082	
Sturgeon-Noblestown	1	Allegheny County		
Sturges	1	Lackawanna County	18447	
Suburban Village	1	Chester County	19380	
Sudan	1	Washington County		
Suedburg	1	Schuylkill County	17963	
Sugar Grove	1	Warren County	16350	
Sugar Grove Township	1	Mercer County		
Sugar Grove Township	1	Warren County		
Sugar Hill	1	Jefferson County	15824	
Sugar Hill	1	Washington County		
Sugar Notch	1	Luzerne County	18706	
Sugar Run	1	Bradford County	18846	
Sugarcreek	1	Venango County	16323	
Sugarcreek Township	1	Armstrong County		
Sugargrove	1	Warren County	16350	
Sugarloaf Township	1	Columbia County		
Sugarloaf Township	1	Luzerne County	18249	
Sugartown	1	Chester County	19355	
Sulger	1	Jefferson County		
Sullivan	1	Fayette County	15445	
Sullivan Township	1	Tioga County		
Sulphur Springs	1	Bedford County		
Sulphur Springs	1	Perry County	17020	
Sumerson	1	Elk County		
Summer Hill	1	Columbia County	18603	
Summerdale	1	Cumberland County	17093	
Summerdale	1	Philadelphia County		
Summerdale Plaza	1	Cumberland County	17025	
Summerhill	1	Cambria County	15958	
Summerhill	1	Lancaster County		
Summerhill Township	1	Cambria County		
Summerhill Township	1	Crawford County		
Summerville	1	Jefferson County	15864	
Summerville	1	Susquehanna County	18822	
Summit	1	Cambria County	16630	
Summit	1	McKean County	16701	
Summit Grove Camp	1	York County	17349	
Summit Hill	1	Carbon County	18250	
Summit Lawn	1	Lehigh County	18103	
Summit Mills	1	Somerset County	15552	
Summit Station	1	Schuylkill County	17979	
Summit Township	1	Butler County		
Summit Township	1	Crawford County		
Summit Township	1	Erie County		
Summit Township	1	Potter County		
Summit Township	1	Somerset County		
Sumneytown	1	Montgomery County	18084	
Sun Valley	1	Monroe County	18330	
Sun Village	1	Delaware County	19013	
Sunbeam	1	Franklin County	17201	
Sunbrook	1	Blair County	16635	
Sunbury	1	Northumberland County	17801	
Suncliff	1	Indiana County		
Sundale	1	Bucks County	18920	
Sunderlinville	1	Potter County	16943	
Sunflower	1	Beaver County		
Sunny Rest Lodge	1	Carbon County		
Sunny Side	1	Allegheny County	15063	
Sunny Side	1	Bedford County		
Sunnybrook	1	Montgomery County	19075	
Sunnybrook Estates	1	Delaware County	19074	
Sunnyburn	1	York County	17302	
Sunnyside	1	Armstrong County		
Sunnyside	1	Lancaster County		
Sunnyside	1	Lawrence County	16101	
Sunnyside	1	Lebanon County	17042	
Sunnyside	1	Northumberland County	17872	
Sunnyside	1	Potter County		
Sunol	1	Mercer County		
Sunset	1	Lebanon County		
Sunset Hills	1	Beaver County	15001	
Sunset Manor	1	York County	17405	
Sunset Pines	1	Clinton County	17745	
Sunset Valley	1	Lawrence County		
Sunset Valley	1	Westmoreland County	15642	
Sunshine	1	Fayette County	15460	
Sunshine	1	Luzerne County	18655	
Sunville	1	Venango County	16317	
Superior	1	Allegheny County		
Superior	1	Fayette County	15417	
Superior	1	Westmoreland County	15627	
Suplee	1	Chester County	19371	
Surrey Hills	1	Delaware County	19073	
Surveyor	1	Clearfield County	16830	
Suscon	1	Luzerne County	18641	
Susquehanna	1	Susquehanna County	18847	
Susquehanna Bridge	1	Clearfield County	16830	
Susquehanna Depot	1	Susquehanna County	18847	
Susquehanna Township	1	Cambria County		
Susquehanna Township	1	Dauphin County		
Susquehanna Township	1	Juniata County		
Susquehanna Township	1	Lycoming County		
Susquehanna Trails	1	York County		
Suter	1	Westmoreland County		
Sutersville	1	Westmoreland County	15083	
Suterville	1	Westmoreland County	15083	
Sutton	1	Clarion County		
Sutton Mill	1	Venango County		
Swales	1	Juniata County	17049	
Swamproot	1	Mercer County		
Swan Acres	1	Allegheny County	15237	
Swanville	1	Erie County		
Swart	1	Greene County	15364	
Swarthmore	1	Delaware County	19081	
Swarthmorwood	1	Delaware County	19081	
Swartzville	1	Lancaster County	17569	
Swatara	1	Dauphin County	17111	
Swatara	1	Schuylkill County	17981	
Swatara Crest	1	Dauphin County		
Swatara Station	1	Dauphin County	17033	
Swatara Township	1	Dauphin County		
Swatara Township	1	Lebanon County		
Swede Hill	1	Westmoreland County	15601	
Swedeland	1	Montgomery County	19401	
Sweden	1	Potter County	16915	
Sweden Township	1	Potter County		
Sweden Valley	1	Potter County	16915	
Swedesburg	1	Montgomery County	19405	
Swedetown	1	Cambria County	16646	
Swedetown	1	Westmoreland County	15683	
Sweeney Plan	1	Westmoreland County	15012	
Sweeneys Crossroads	1	Westmoreland County		
Sweet Valley	1	Luzerne County	18656	
Sweetwater	1	Franklin County		
Swengel	1	Union County	17880	
Swiftwater	1	Monroe County	18370	
Swineford	1	Snyder County	17842	
Swissdale	1	Clinton County	17745	
Swissmont	1	Elk County		
Swissvale	1	Allegheny County	15218	
Switzer	1	Lehigh County	18066	
Swoyersville	1	Luzerne County	18704	
Syberton	1	Cambria County		
Sybertsville	1	Luzerne County	18251	
Sycamore	1	Greene County	15364	
Sycamore Mills	1	Delaware County	19063	
Sygan	1	Allegheny County	15017	
Sygan Hill	1	Allegheny County	15017	
Sykesville	1	Jefferson County	15865	
Sylmar	1	Chester County	19362	
Sylvan	1	Franklin County	17236	
Sylvan Dell	1	Berks County	19606	
Sylvan Dell	1	Lycoming County	17701	
Sylvan Grove	1	Clearfield County	16858	
Sylvan Hills	1	Blair County	16648	
Sylvan Lane	1	Somerset County		
Sylvania	1	Bradford County	16945	
Sylvania Township	1	Potter County		
Sylvester	1	Tioga County		
Sylvis	1	Clearfield County		
Syner	1	Lebanon County	17003	
