= Southeast (disambiguation) =

Southeast is a compass point.

Southeast, south-east, south east, southeastern, south-eastern, or south eastern may also refer to:

- Southeast (direction), an intercardinal direction

== Places ==
=== United Kingdom ===
- South East England
- South East London (disambiguation), variously defined regions of London, England

=== United States ===
- Downstate New York, aka Southeastern New York
- South East San Diego
- Southeast, Saint Paul, Minnesota
- Southeast, New York, a town in Putnam County, New York state
- Southeast, Eugene, Oregon
- Southeast, Washington, D.C.
- Southeast Township, Indiana
- Southeastern, Pennsylvania
- Southeastern United States

=== Other countries ===
- Southeast Asia, geographical south-eastern region of the continent of Asia
- South East of South Australia, aka the Limestone Coast, in the state of South Australia, Australia
- South East Delhi district, Delhi, India
- South-East District, Botswana
- Southeast Region, Brazil
- Southeast Sulawesi, Indonesia
- South-East Region, Ireland
- South Eastern Region, Malta
- South East Nigeria
- South-East, Russian SFSR (1920–1924), a former administrative division
- South East District, Singapore
- Southeast Turkey
- Southeast (Vietnam), or Đông Nam Bộ

== Schools ==
- Southeastern University (disambiguation)
- Southeastern Louisiana University
- Southeastern Baptist Theological Seminary, North Carolina

== Rail transport ==
United Kingdom

- Network SouthEast, a sector of British Rail known as London & South Eastern before 1986
- South Eastern Railway (England), railway company from 1836 to 1899
- South Eastern and Chatham Railway, successor of the English South Eastern Railway from 1899 to 1923
- Connex South Eastern, English train company from 1996 to 2003
- South Eastern Trains, English train company from 2003 to 2006
- London & South Eastern Railway, English train company from 2006 to 2021 which traded under the name Southeastern
- Southeastern (train operating company), current state-owned English train company since 2021
- South Eastern franchise, railway franchise in South East England
- South Eastern Main Line, major railway route between London and Dover in England

Elsewhere

- Austrian Southeastern Railway, a state railway in Austria-Hungary
- Southeastern Railroad, a former railway in North Carolina, United States
- Southeastern Railway (Russia), a railway company in Russia
- South Eastern Railway (Quebec), a railway in Canada
- South Eastern Railway zone, one of eighteen Indian railway zones
- Südostbahn (German: South-Eastern Railway), a railway company and network in Switzerland operating since 2001
- Schweizerische Südostbahn (1890) (German: Swiss Southeastern Railway), a former railway company in Switzerland that operated from 1890 to 2001

== Other uses ==
- South East Motor Corporation, a motor vehicle manufacturer in Fuzhou, China
- Southeast (Metro-North station), railway station serving Southeast, New York
- Southeast Division (NBA), National Basketball Association
- Southeastern (album), by Jason Isbell

== See also ==
- Sud-Est (disambiguation), French for "southeast"
- Yugo-Vostochny (disambiguation), Russian for "southeastern"
