= Springtown =

Springtown may refer to:

== In Canada ==
- Springtown, Ontario

== In Northern Ireland ==
- Springtown Camp, a former housing area near Derry City, Co. Londonderry, Northern Ireland
- Springtown, County Tyrone, a townland in County Tyrone, Northern Ireland

== In the United States ==
- Springtown, Arkansas
- Springtown, California
- Springtown, Indiana
- Springtown, New Jersey in Cumberland County
- Springtown, Warren County, New Jersey
  - Springtown Stagecoach Inn, listed on the NRHP in Warren County, New Jersey
- Springtown, Bucks County, Pennsylvania
  - Springtown Historic District
- Springtown, Franklin County, Pennsylvania
- Springtown, Luzerne County, Pennsylvania, a place in Pennsylvania
- Springtown, Northumberland County, Pennsylvania, a place in Pennsylvania
- Springtown, Texas
  - Springtown Independent School District
