= Rosedale Banishment =

Ethnic cleansing in Johnstown, Pennsylvania in 1923

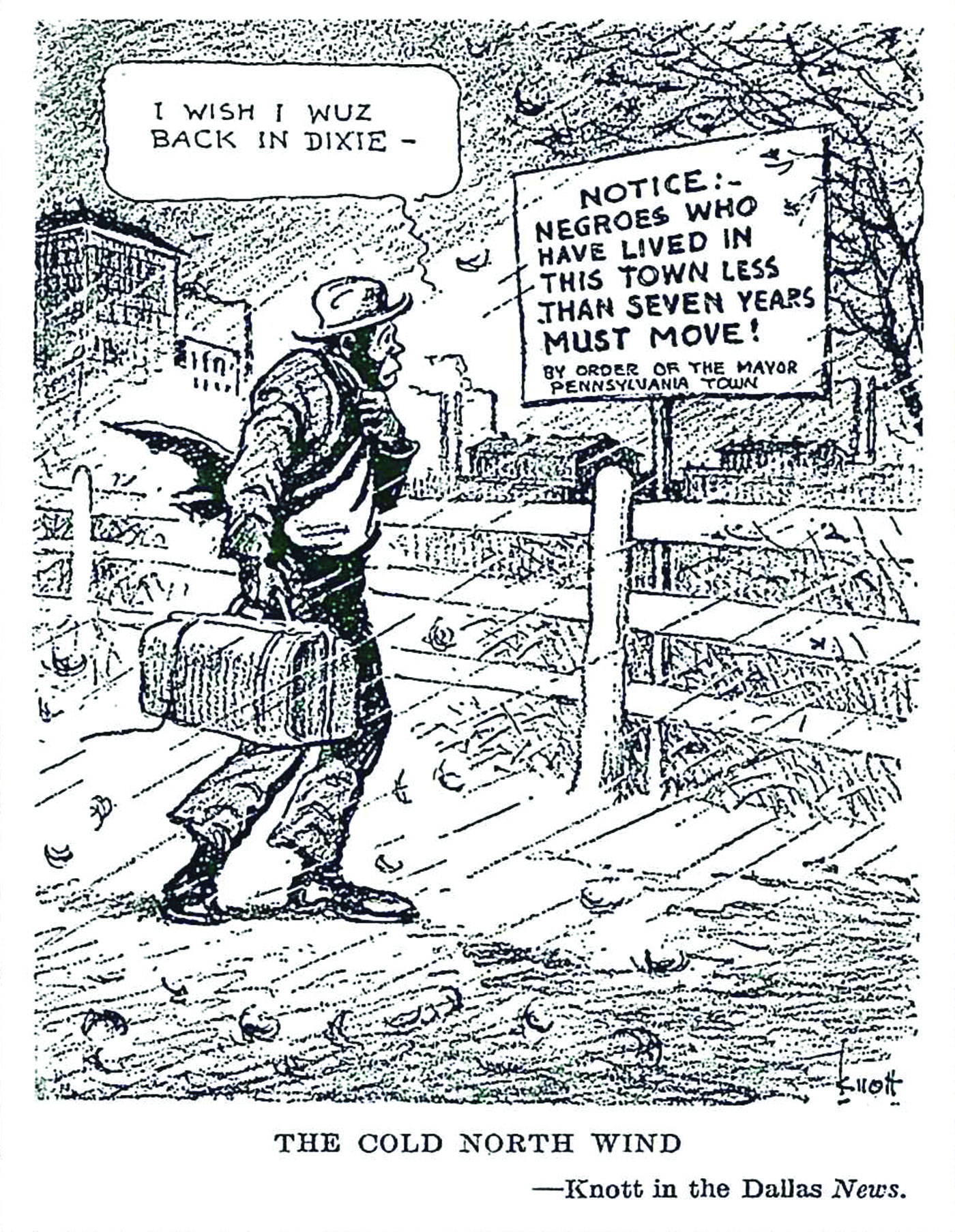
1923 political cartoon by John Knott in the Dallas News, titled The Cold North Wind, criticizing Johnstown’s order expelling Black residents who had lived there less than seven years.

The Rosedale Banishment was a mass expulsion of African American and Mexican residents from Johnstown, Pennsylvania, in September 1923. Ordered by Mayor Joseph Cauffiel, the policy targeted anyone from those groups who had lived in the city for fewer than seven years. While Cauffiel framed the action as a crime-control measure following a violent incident involving a Black steelworker, state police and NAACP investigations concluded it was unlawful, racially motivated, and carried out under the color of law.

== Background ==
By the early 1920s, Johnstown’s Rosedale neighborhood had become home to a growing number of Black migrants from the South and Mexican laborers, many of whom were recruited to work in the steel industry. The neighborhood was physically isolated, lacked basic sanitation, and received little municipal investment.

According to Howard University Dean Kelly Miller, Rosedale’s housing consisted of shanties, overcrowded tenements, and stockades without plumbing or chimneys, where 100 people might sleep in one building. He described the conditions as “destructive alike to body and soul,” leaving residents with only two modes of pastime, immorality and gambling. Both national and local trends shaped the racial climate in Johnstown. The early 1920s saw a resurgence of the Ku Klux Klan in Pennsylvania, with marches, rallies, and cross burnings reported in nearby towns. Klan organizers often exploited fears about immigration and migration, portraying Black newcomers as threats to public safety and morality. In Johnstown, local newspapers routinely associated African American migrants with crime in their headlines and coverage, creating a public perception that Southern arrivals were inherently lawless. These portrayals often ignored the poverty, lack of infrastructure, and racial discrimination that limited opportunities for Black residents, instead framing them as outsiders who brought vice and disorder into the city. State police and later NAACP investigations found that. It contributed to a hostile environment in which political leaders could justify discriminatory actions with widespread support.

== Robert Young incident ==
On August 27, 1923, Robert Young, a 24-year-old Black steelworker originally from the South, allegedly under the influence of alcohol and narcotics, shot and seriously wounded Johnstown Police Officer Joseph Grachan during an attempted arrest. Young had a prior criminal record and was accused of resisting arrest with a revolver. He was captured after a chase, and the shooting shocked the city’s white population. Four police officers died afterward. Mayor Cauffiel seized on the incident to call for drastic measures. In a letter to Governor Gifford Pinchot, he later claimed Johnstown was “overrun by many negroes from the South, paroled from the southern prisons,” asserting that the city’s peace required the removal of newer Black and Mexican residents. Cauffiel publicly announced that all members of those groups who had lived in Johnstown for fewer than seven years would have to leave.

== Order and enforcement ==
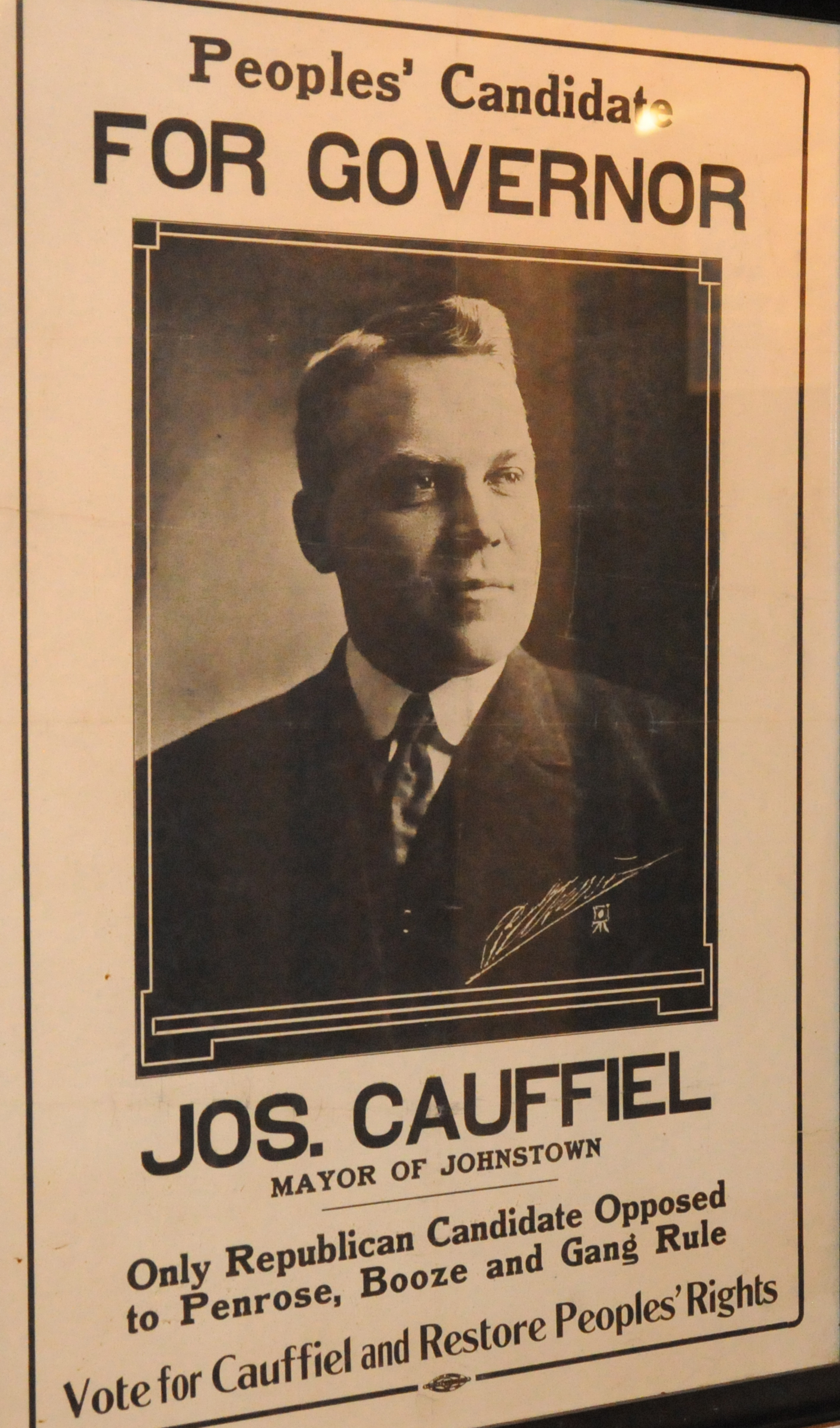
Campaign poster for Joseph Cauffiel, mayor of Johnstown and the official who ordered the 1923 Rosedale Banishment, promoting his run for Pennsylvania governor as the “People’s Candidate.”

Beginning on September 7, 1923, police began enforcing Cauffiel’s directive.

According to Johnstown Democrat reports and state police interviews, individuals were given as little as two hours to leave. Officers conducted raids in Rosedale and rounded people up on petty charges. At the time, mayors served on police courts, which gave them the same power as magistrates. Cauffiel held that position, too. To intimidate the defendants into leaving, they were threatened with prison time. Cauffiel implied that they would be hanged in the south if a similar thing had happened there. Cauffiel imposed fines with immediate departure orders. In several court appearances before Cauffiel, defendants reported that the mayor used openly racist language, referring to them as “n——” while ordering them to leave the city.

Witnesses told investigators that such language was common in his courtroom during the banishment period, and that Cauffiel often used it in front of white spectators, reinforcing the impression that the expulsions had official community backing. Sgt. George W. Freeman of the Pennsylvania State Police recorded that Cauffiel told two boys that they would be shot at sunrise if they didn't leave. Police officers then fired blank cartridges at them. The expulsions affected both recent arrivals and long-time residents. H.R. Samuels and his son Levi Samuels—described by police as “respectable and law-abiding”—were targeted. Levi, fearing mob violence, persuaded some to leave voluntarily until tensions subsided. Deputy Attorney General John English later reported in an official state investigation that Cauffiel had forced 300 to 1,000 Black and Mexican residents to depart. Other estimates, however, placed the number of people forced to leave at more than 2,000, suggesting that the actual scope of the banishment may have been far greater than city officials acknowledged.

== NAACP investigation ==
The NAACP dispatched investigator George White to Johnstown. White interviewed residents, ministers, and business leaders, documenting how the Black community’s leadership had tried to protect people under threat. He reported that the local NAACP wasn't well-organized. His investigation indicated that one of the officers involved in the shootout, John James, may have been taking bribes. Another officer involved in the shootout, Otto Fink, was linked to the Ku Klux Klan.

== National and regional reactions ==
The Black press, including the Pittsburgh Courier and Baltimore Afro-American, was among the first to challenge the city’s justification for the expulsions, framing the event as a blatant act of racial cleansing. Their coverage drew national attention and began shifting the narrative. Within weeks, some white-owned newspapers, initially supportive or neutral, began condemning the action, warning that such measures would undermine the rule of law and tarnish Johnstown’s reputation. The growing criticism energized civil rights leaders. James Weldon Johnson, executive secretary of the NAACP, personally lobbied Governor Pinchot to intervene. Public letters from figures such as J.S. Wannamaker and columns by Kelly Miller amplified the case, linking Johnstown’s policy to broader patterns of racial injustice and economic exploitation. This wave of negative press made many Johnstown residents uneasy about the city’s image—the backlash, both locally and nationally, contributed to Cauffiel’s political decline and eventual electoral defeat.

== Aftermath ==
Despite national condemnation, no charges were filed against Cauffiel or any officers. Many expelled families never returned, and Rosedale’s demographic makeup changed permanently as a result. Historians view the Rosedale Banishment as one of the clearest examples of racially motivated expulsion in the North during the Jim Crow era. Similar events happened in South Bend and Stowe Township near Pittsburgh. The episode also demonstrated the Black press's ability to reframe public debates and pressure mainstream outlets to reassess local racial conflicts, influencing political outcomes.

== Centennial commemorations ==
=== State-Level proclamation ===
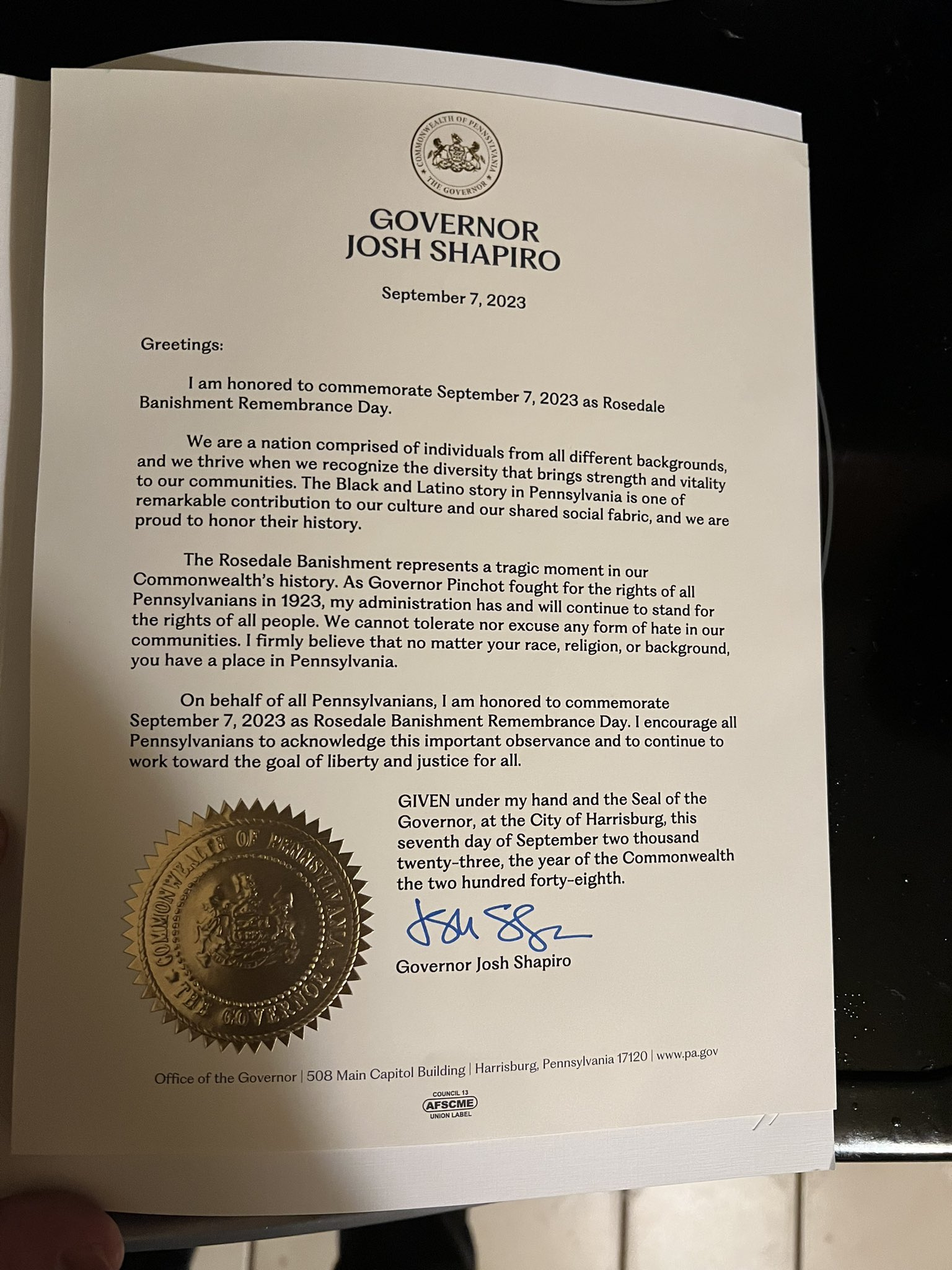
Governor Josh Shapiro’s September 7, 2023 proclamation designating Rosedale Banishment Remembrance Day, honoring Black and Latino history in Pennsylvania and condemning the 1923 expulsion from Johnstown.

On September 7, 2023, Pennsylvania Governor Josh Shapiro issued a formal proclamation describing the Rosedale banishment as “a tragic moment in our Commonwealth’s history” and encouraged Pennsylvanians to acknowledge and reflect on it.

=== Historical marker ===
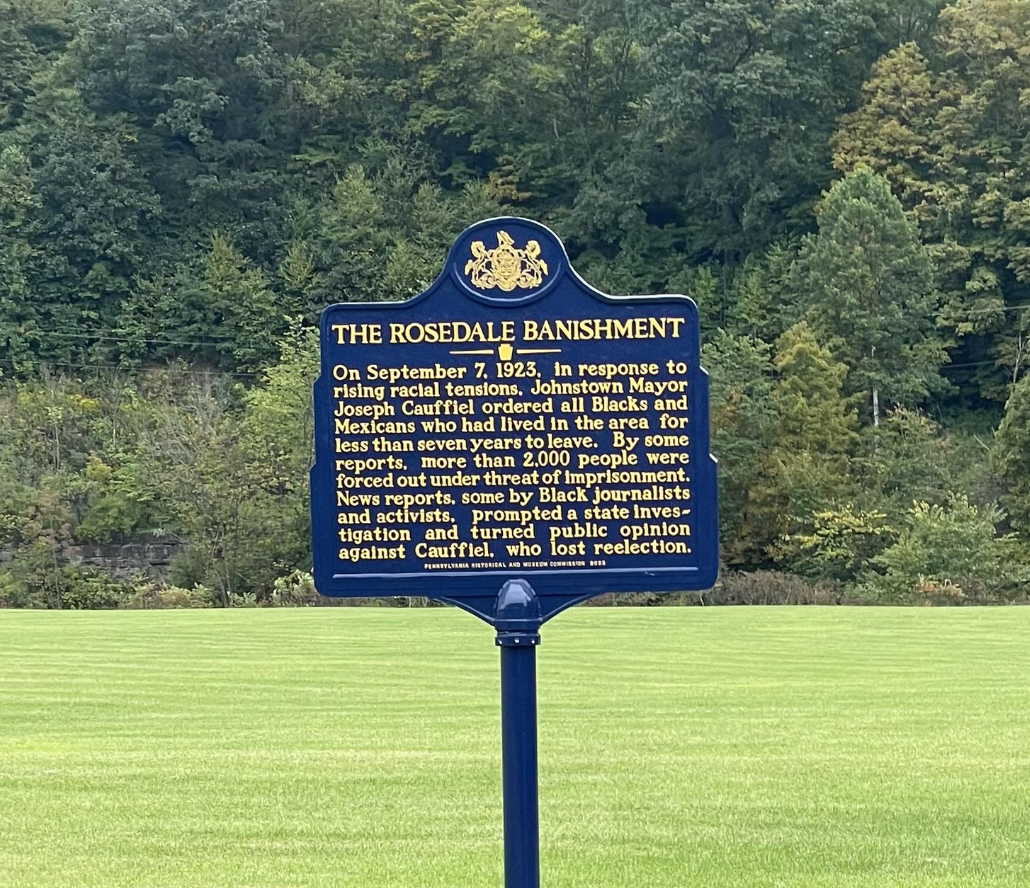
A Pennsylvania state historical marker commemorating the Rosedale Banishment, dedicated in 2023 during the 100th anniversary of the mass expulsion of Black and Mexican residents from Johnstown, Pennsylvania.

Community leaders met on Nov. 9, 2023, to unveil a Pennsylvania historical marker commemorating the Rosedale Banishment at the Hinckston Run dam site near Johnstown. The ceremony included remarks by community leaders, including Johnstown NAACP leader Alan Cashaw.

=== Senator’s proclamation ===
Former U.S. Senator Robert Casey Jr. submitted a written statement to be read at the centennial remembrance of the Rosedale Edict. In his remarks, Casey described the edict as a “terrible injustice,” noting that its impact was compounded by the emboldening of the Ku Klux Klan and the lasting harm inflicted on those who remained in the community. He emphasized the need to acknowledge systemic injustice in the United States, which he said stems from the nation’s legacy of slavery and has been sustained through centuries of racial oppression.

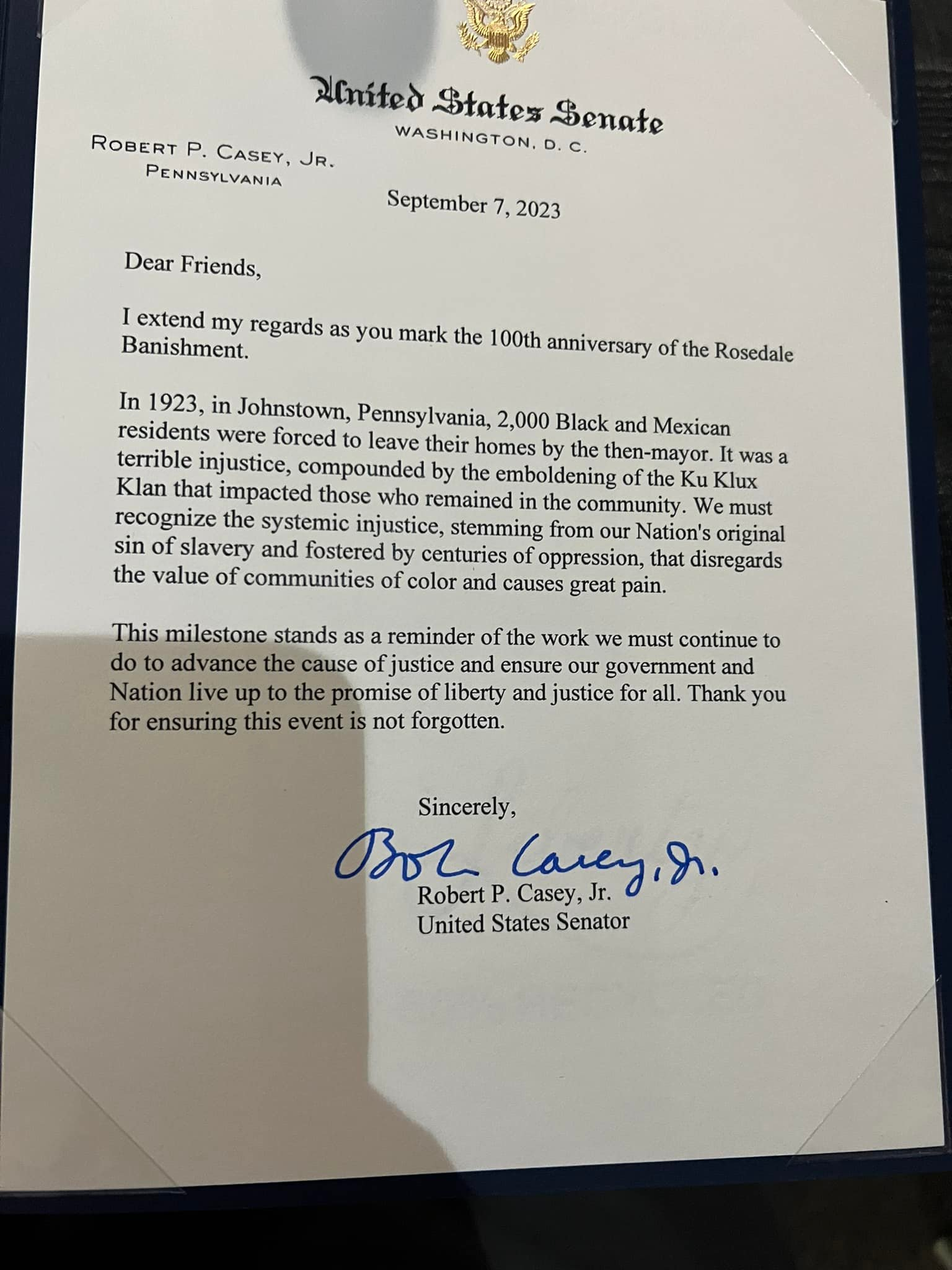
Letter from U.S. Senator Robert P. Casey Jr. commemorating the 100th anniversary of the Rosedale Banishment and condemning it as a historical injustice linked to racial oppression and the influence of the Ku Klux Klan.

=== Local proclamations ===
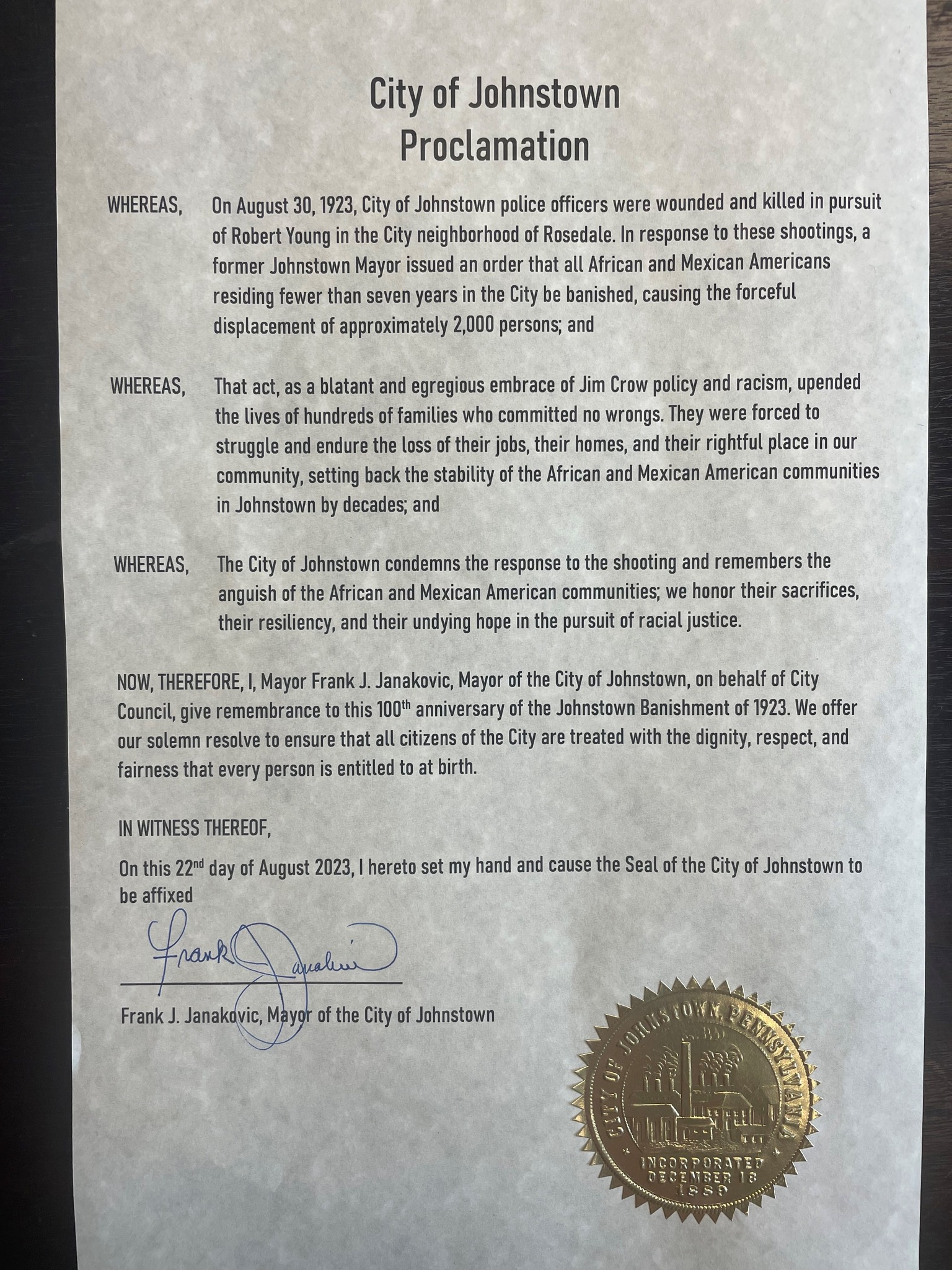
Proclamation by Johnstown Mayor Frank J. Janakovic on August 22, 2023, marking the 100th anniversary of the Rosedale Banishment and condemning the 1923 expulsion of about 2,000 Black and Mexican American residents.

On Aug. 22, 2023, Johnstown Mayor Frank J. Janakovic issued a proclamation recognizing the centennial of the expulsion and the need for public remembrance.

=== Community events ===
In addition to the marker unveiling, a public remembrance event was held at Johnstown's Heritage Discovery Center on September 7, 2023, that featured speakers and community participation, offering a forum to share stories and reflect on the legacy of the expulsion.
