= South Eastern District =

South Eastern District or South East District may refer to several places:

Country subdivisions

- South-East District, Botswana
- South Eastern subregion, Eritrea
- South Eastern District, Malta

Other uses

- South Eastern School District, York County, Pennsylvania
- South East Community Development Council, Singapore

== See also ==
- Southeast
