= West Penn Railways =

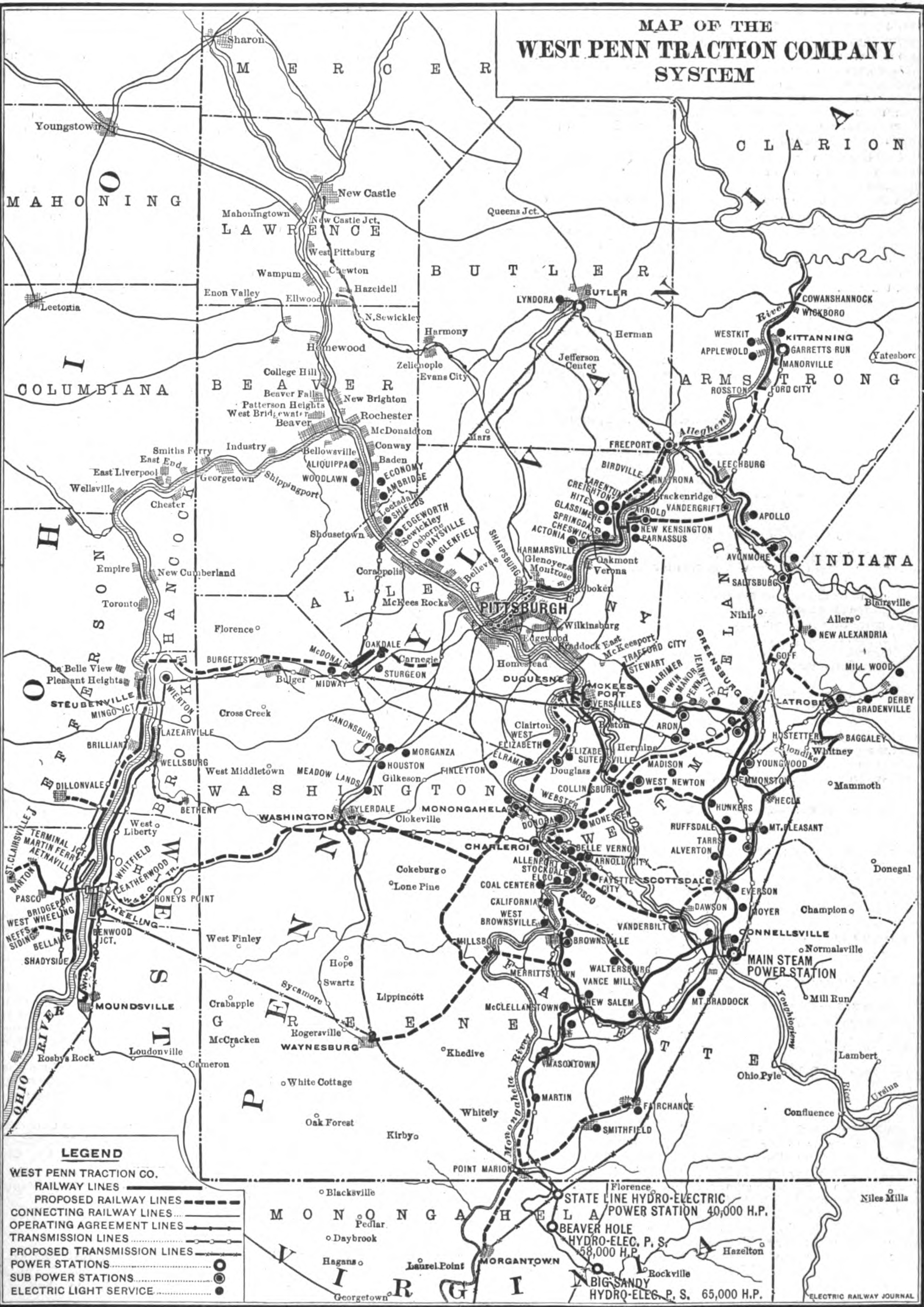
- 1914 system map

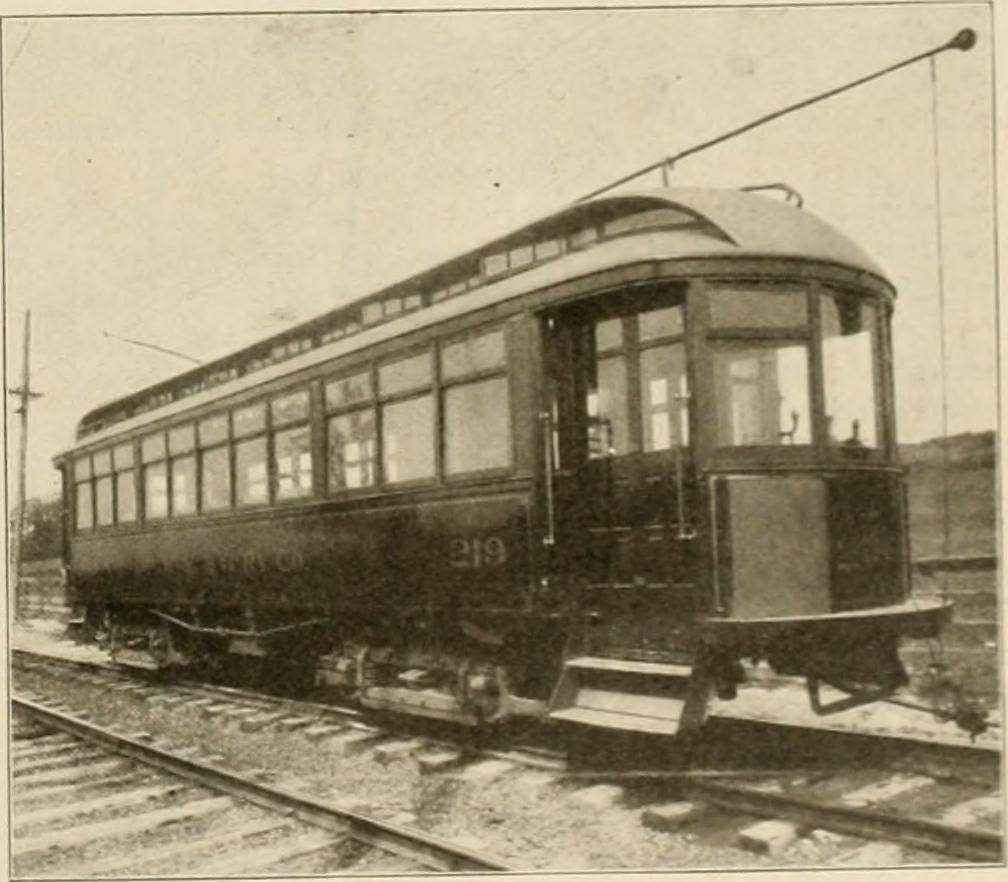
- A West Penn Railways car in 1891

Overview
- Headquarters: Connellsville, Pennsylvania
- Locale: Pennsylvania, Ohio, West Virginia
- Dates of operation: 1904–1952
- Predecessor: Brownsville Street Railway Co., Greensburg and Southern Electric Street Railway Co, Latrobe Street Railway Co., and others
- Successor: None (Exception: Co-operative Transit Company was the successor of Wheeling area lines.)

Technical
- Track gauge: 5 ft 2 1/2 in (1,588 mm) (Exception: Kittanning area lines were 4 ft 8 1/2 in or 1,435 mm standard gauge.)
- Length: 339 miles (546 km)

West Penn Railways, one part of the West Penn System, was an interurban electric railway headquartered in Connellsville, Pennsylvania. It was part of the region's power generation utility.

== History ==
West Penn Railways consisted of 339 miles (546 km) of electric trolley trackage at its peak. It operated in a well populated mining region of rugged mountainous western Pennsylvania and connected numerous towns and villages with hourly or better transport from its north end towns at McKeesport, Latrobe and Trafford through the larger towns of Greensburg, Mt Pleasant, Connellsville, Scottdale, and Uniontown continuing to southernmost Fairchance and Martin. A branch extended to Brownsville on the Monongahela River. Some of its predecessor trolley companies operated as early as 1889 in the Greensburg area and as early as 1893 in the Wheeling area. West Penn Railways Company, as a separate corporate entity from its parent power company, was chartered on February 18, 1904. It operated a very active and inexpensive regional transportation service until August 9, 1952, when its last trolley ran on its one time busiest Uniontown to Greensburg line. Because much of its fare generating business was to bring residents of outlying areas into nearby towns for shopping and entertainment in the evenings and the weekend, particularly to see movies in the 1930s and 1940s, the West Penn's business declined with the drop in area mine and coking employment, the construction of better roads, and increased car ownership and use. An unsubstantiated story holds that once television reached the region, West Penn's management, facing an obvious future of fewer and fewer riders due to people staying home to watch TV, quickly decided to abandon railway operations. Near abandonment, as shown in photographs of the time, the still well maintained big orange trolleys ominously carried signs reading, "To keep the 5c fare we need more riders". In many parts of North America before automobiles and trucks, the interurbans were the only reliable way to travel and to move farm products to market quickly and economically. By the time of World War I, the street railway industry was the fifth largest industry in the United States, employing well over 100,000 people nationwide, but by the mid 1920s, many had abandoned operation. On August 9, 1952, the last scheduled West Penn Ry trolley left Greensburg at 11:00 pm and ended at Everson at 12:05 am.

== Operation ==
Like most interurbans, West Penn's trolleys were powered from an overhead electric wire. The cars themselves were larger and heavier than typical city streetcars and were painted in a standout bright orange. West Penn's broad gauge (5 ft 2 1/2 in) single track was laid in streets in towns, but in the countryside the track often ran on a right-of-way separate from roads. At some points, the West Penn's single track reentered a road in order to use a road bridge, and it sometimes ran not in the center of the bridge but on one side. Motorists had the unusual problem of facing a trolley approaching head-on in their lane. This odd arrangement also existed in some of the towns where the trolley ran alongside a curb. In the country, sidings allowed opposing cars to pass at various points, and a crude but effective block signal system protected the car's progress and required the West Penn motorman to reach from his trolley window and throw a toggle switch. West Penn had some impressively substantial bridges crossing ravines and valleys. Bridges at Footedale, Cob Run, and Brownsville Junction were particularly high and long. Typical for interurbans, stops were much more frequent than for a conventional railroad, curves were tighter, and gradients (slopes) could be much steeper. West Penn Railway as a vibrant transportation system played a key role in the pre-automobile unpaved poor road era and was an important factor in the region's economy. Three branches of the WPRy crossed the Pennsylvania Turnpike.

== Former structures still standing ==
The depot building in Greensburg (constructed in 1927) still stands at 416 South Main Street and is now used as the Greensburg City Hall. The freight station in Greensburg, slightly to the west of City Hall, is also extant. In Connellsville, the former West Penn depot is a three-story structure now used as a bank at 125 South Arch Street. In Uniontown, the former depot (11 East Penn Street), built in 1932, is used as a business school.

A concrete bridge built in 1908 over Monongahela Creek still exists near Allison, Pennsylvania.

The West Penn Railway had a number of steel bridges and viaducts crossing deep ravines and wide valleys, some remarkable in structural size and height for what amounted to a regional trolley line. These were located particularly in the region south of Uniontown. The concrete and stone piers and abutments that once supported these structures still exist.

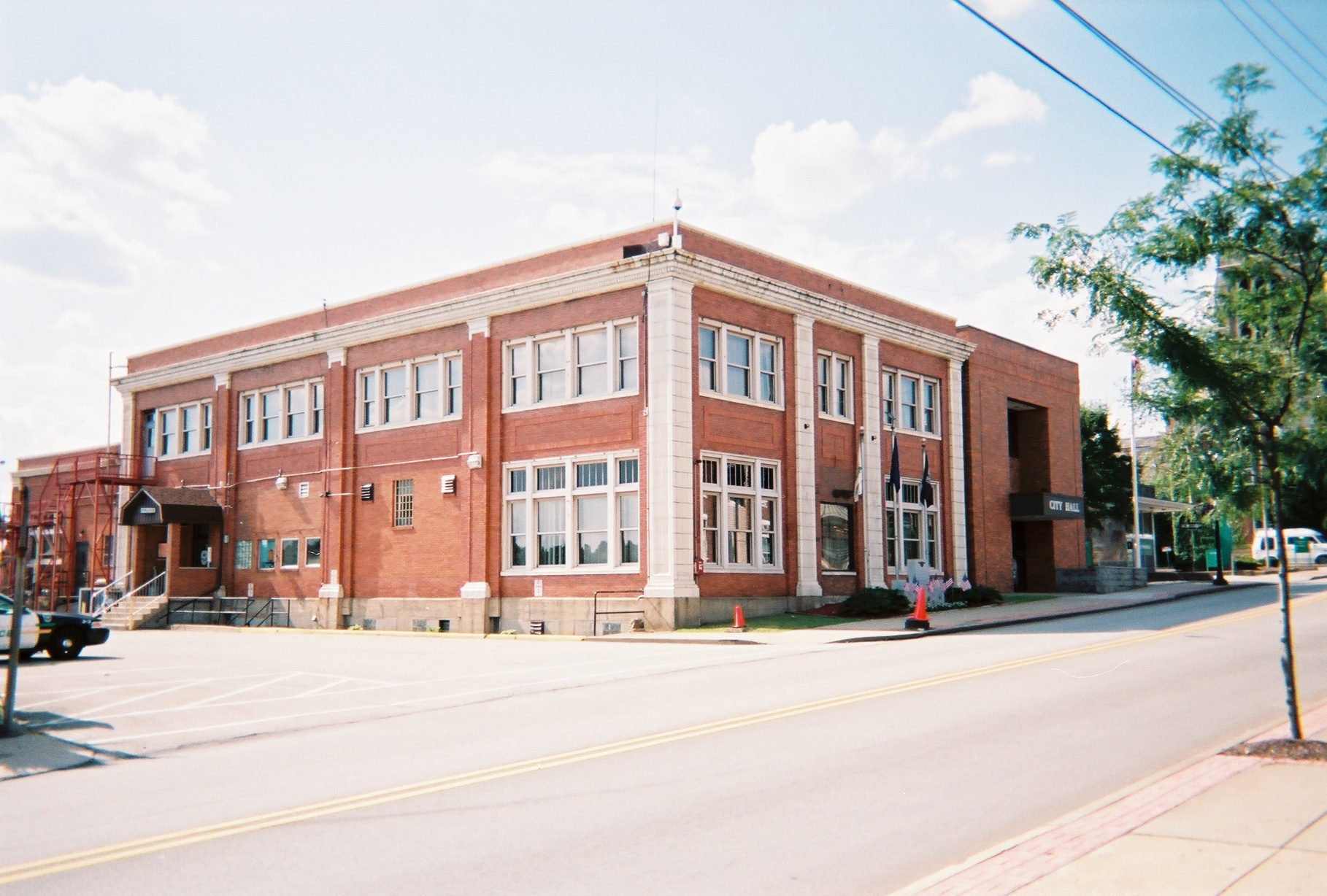
Former depot in Greensburg, now City Hall

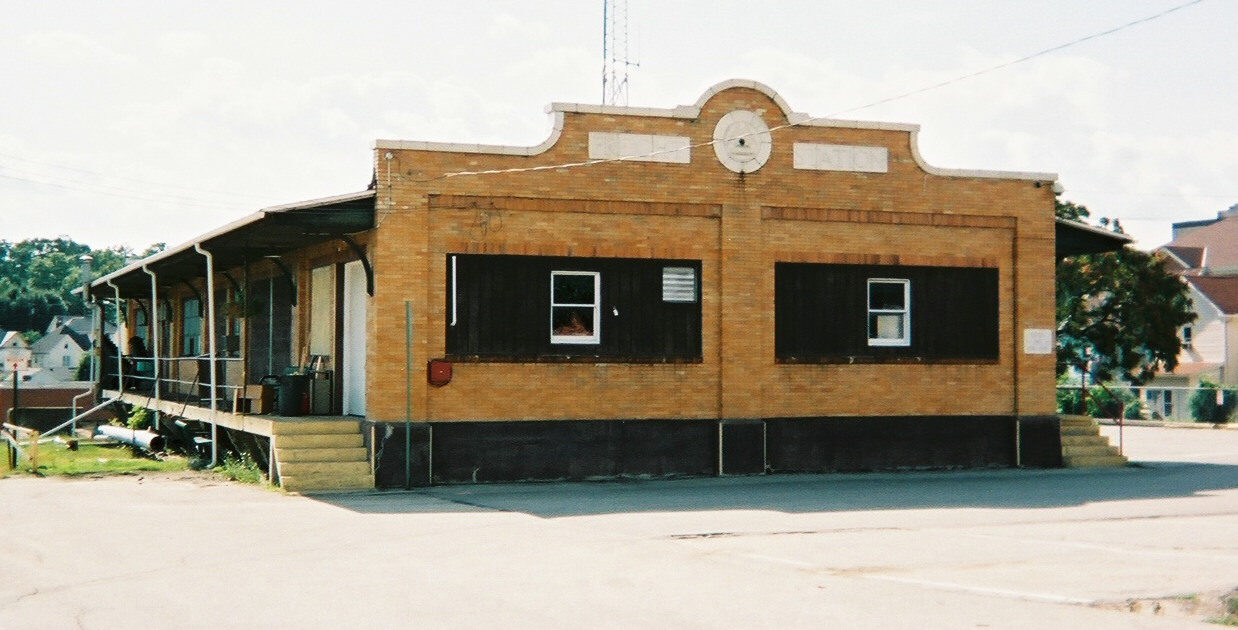
Former freight station in Greensburg

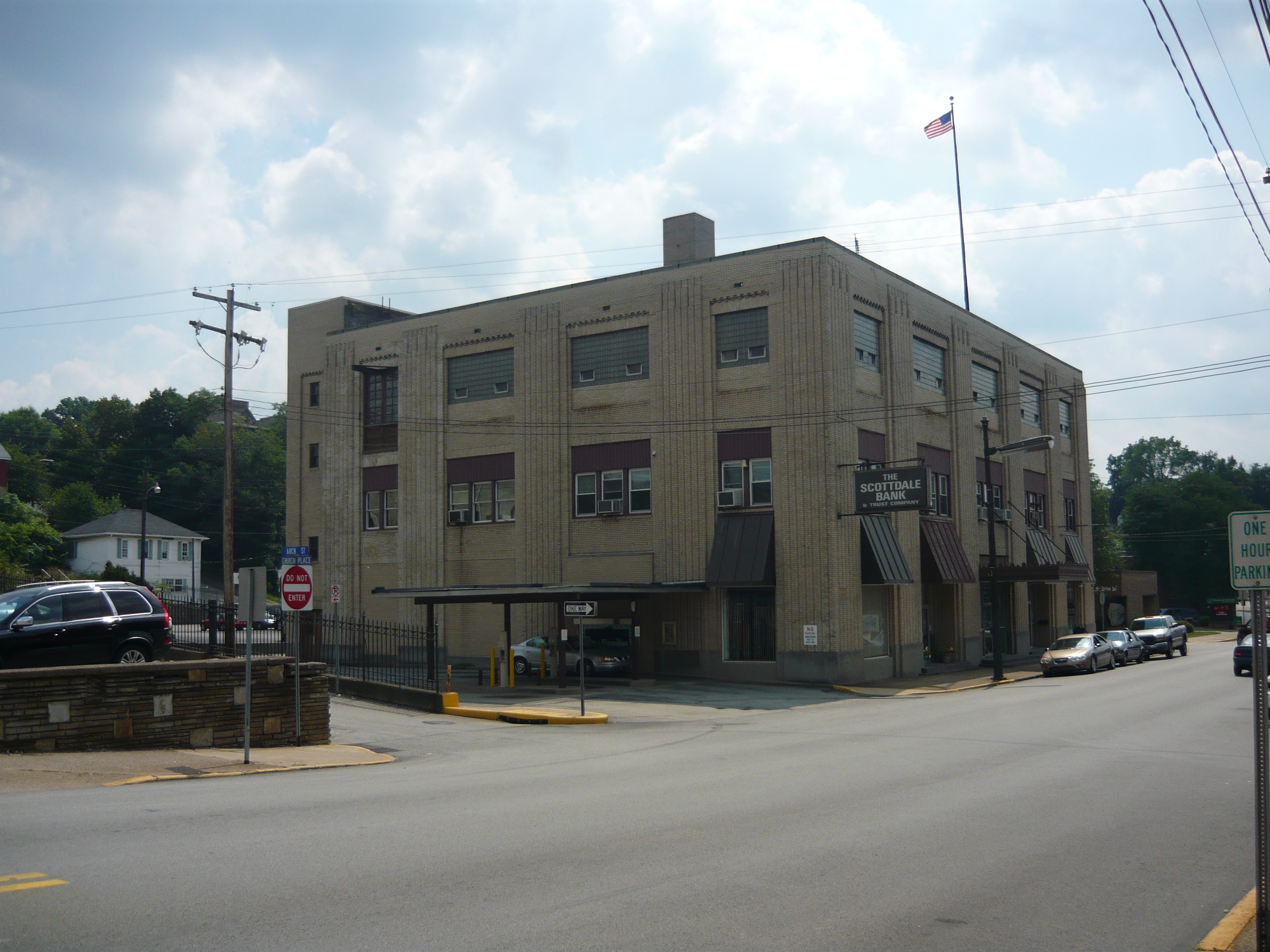
Former depot in Connellsville

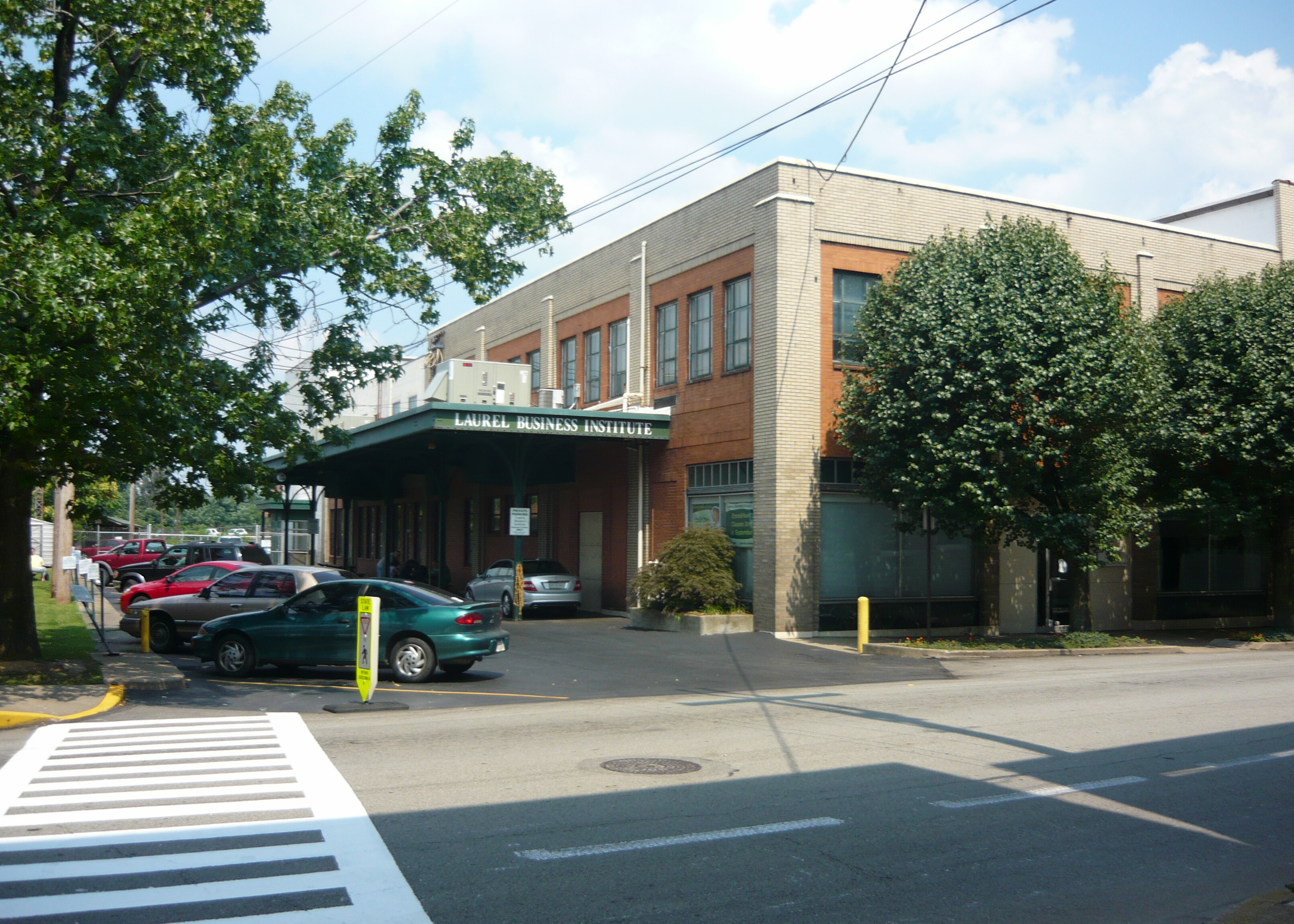
Former depot in Uniontown

== Coke Region lines ==
The bulk of West Penn Railways' trackage formed a network in Allegheny, Westmoreland, and Fayette counties of Pennsylvania, comprising 158 miles (254 km) in 1917. Headquarters was in Connellsville. The main line ran from Greensburg through Hecla (now known as Southwest), Mount Pleasant, Scottdale, Connellsville, and Uniontown, a distance of 31 miles (50 km). This trip took 2 hours 25 minutes, with service provided every half-hour. The speed averaged approximately 13 miles per hour (21 km/h), including stops. The ridership was almost entirely local in nature; most passengers rode only a few miles (mainly from their homes to the nearest town for shopping, or to go to work). Service ended on August 9, 1952.

The phrase "Coke Region" is based on the area's fame for producing coke (fuel) from coal needed in the making of steel. The coke industry suffered a major blow in the 1920s when coke was obtained from the coal burned to heat steel mill ovens and those facilities were built adjacent to Pittsburgh's steel mills. The coke making "beehive" facilities that dotted West Penn's trolley territory were rendered nearly obsolete. The trolleys had fewer passengers to take to work, and a decline in passenger business began in earnest.

Branches and minor lines were as follows. (Date of last rail service is in parentheses.)

- McKeesport - Wilmerding (1904)
- McKeesport - Lincoln Way (1924)
- Locust Street, McKeesport (1925)
- Jerome Street, McKeesport (1928)
- Scottdate - Meadow Mill (1931)
- Boston - Scott Haven (1932)
- Greensburg - Bunker Hill (1934)
- Tarr - Mount Pleasant (1936)
- Irwin - McKeesport (1938)
- Greensburg - Hunker - Scottdale (1939)
- Larimer - Trafford (1942)
- Irwin - Larimer (1948)
- Uniontown - Brownsville (1950)
- Uniontown - Martin (1950)
- Uniontown - Fairchance (1950)
- Connellsville - Dickerson Run (1951)
- Connellsville - Phillips - Uniontown (parallel to the main line but separate) (1951)
- Irwin - Greensburg (1952)
- Latrobe - Hecla (now Southwest) (1952)
- Connellsville - South Connellsville (1952)

== Noncontiguous lines ==
There were five other components of West Penn Railways which did not connect to each other or to the main network of "Coke Region" tracks:

- Allegheny Valley Street Railway: This line ran parallel to the Allegheny River northeast of Pittsburgh, running from Aspinwall to Natrona. A branch crossed the river to serve New Kensington, Parnassus, and Arnold. Service began in 1906 and ended in 1937.
- Apollo–Leechburg: Operated 1906–1936 along the north bank of the Kiskiminetas River from Apollo to Leechburg.
- Cowanshannock–Kittanning–Lenape Park: A line ran from Cowanshannock to Kittanning to Lenape Park, an amusement park built and operated by the company. This line was built to a 4 ft 8 1/2 in (1,435 mm) gauge, the only element of West Penn Railways not built to 5 ft 2 1/2 in (1,588 mm) gauge. Service began in 1899 and ended in 1936.
- Oakdale–McDonald: A short suburban line in the Pittsburgh area connecting Oakdale and McDonald. Service began in 1907 and ended in 1927.
- Wheeling Traction Company of West Virginia: A subsidiary controlled by West Penn Railways from 1912 to 1931. Service operated from Wheeling south to Moundsville, and from Wheeling north to Weirton. Another line ran on the opposite (western) bank of the Ohio River, from Shadyside to Rayland, with a branch to Barton, and a connection by bridge to Wheeling. Another branch connected Brilliant and Steubenville to the Wheeling-Weirton line. Track length in 1917 was 102 miles (164 km). Wheeling's earliest trolley service consisted of horse-drawn trolleys in 1863 and electric trolleys in 1890, although this was prior to West Penn Railways acquiring control in 1906. Control by West Penn Railways ended in 1931, after which an employee-owned cooperative, Co-operative Transit Company, conducted operations on the Wheeling-Barton and Wheeling-Shadyside routes until 1948 when river flooding caused irreparable damage.
