= Stateline =

State Line or Stateline may refer to:

- Border, a geographic boundary

== Media ==
- Stateline (TV program) from the Australian Broadcasting Corporation
- Stateline, a U.S. service owned by States Newsroom

== Places ==
- Stateline, California, near Lake Tahoe
- Stateline, Idaho, A city in Kootenai County
- State Line, St. Joseph County, Indiana
- State Line, Vigo County, Indiana
- Guthrie, Kentucky, formerly known as State Line
- State Line, Kentucky
- State Line, Mississippi
- Stateline, Nevada
- State Line, Nevada, now known as Primm
- State Line, Pennsylvania (disambiguation), several places
- State Line, South Carolina
- State Line City, Indiana
- State Line, Fitzwilliam, New Hampshire

== Roads ==
- State Line Avenue, between Texas and Arkansas in the Texarkana metropolitan area
- State Line Road, between Kansas and Missouri in the Kansas City metropolitan area

== See also ==
- States Line, a shipping company
- Stateline Wind Project
