= Yugo-Vostochny =

Yugo-Vostochny (masculine), Yugo-Vostochnaya (feminine), or Yugo-Vostochnoye (neuter) means South-East and may refer to:

- South-Eastern Administrative Okrug (Yugo-Vostochny administrativny okrug), an administrative okrug of the federal city of Moscow, Russia
- Yugo-Vostochny (rural locality), a rural locality (a khutor) in Stepnovsky District of Stavropol Krai, Russia
- Yugo-Vostochnaya (Moscow Metro), a station on the Moscow Metro planned to open in 2018
- Yugo-Vostochnaya (Saint Petersburg Metro), a planned station on Saint Petersburg Metro
- Yugo-Vostochnaya (Nizhny Novgorod Metro), a planned station on Nizhny Novgorod Metro
- Yugo-Vostochnaya Railway, also known in English as South Eastern Railway
- Yugo-Vostochnaya Oblast, also known in English as South-Eastern Oblast, one of the names for South-East, Russian SFSR
- Yugo-Vostochny Krai, also known in English as South-Eastern Krai, one of the names for South-East, Russian SFSR

== See also ==
- South-East, Russian SFSR (Yugo-Vostok) (1920–1924), an administrative division of the early Russian SFSR
