= Kuban-Black Sea Oblast =

Kuban Black Sea Oblast (Russian: Куба́но-Черномо́рская о́бласть) was an administrative division (an oblast) of the Russian Soviet Federative Socialist Republic which existed in 1920–1924.

When Soviet power was re-established in the region of Kuban in March 1920, the executive power in the region formally belonged to the Provisional Kuban Executive Committee, established on March 18, 1920. On March 27, 1920, the committee's duties were transferred to the Kuban Oblast Revolutionary Committee, which supervised the territories of Kuban Oblast and Black Sea Governorate. On March 29, 1920, the committee was renamed "Kuban Black Sea Revolutionary Committee", and as a result of that the joint territory of Kuban Oblast and Black Sea Governorate started to be referred to as "Kuban Black Sea Oblast", after the committee's new name, although no formal decrees establishing a new administrative unit had been passed. The new oblast was not officially recognized until December 7, 1920.

On August 7, 1920, the jurisdiction over Kuban Black Sea Oblast, as well as over several neighboring territories, was transferred to the Revolutionary Soviet of the South-East Russian Labor Army. Although the Soviet itself ceased to exist in the 1921, the territory of its jurisdiction continued to be informally known as "South-East" (sometimes also as "South-Eastern Krai" or "South-Eastern Oblast").

Kuban Black Sea Oblast ceased to exist on February 13, 1924, when it was re-organized into four okrugs of South-Eastern Oblast (Krai).
