= New Freeport, Pennsylvania =

Unincorporated community in Pennsylvania, US

- Census-designated place
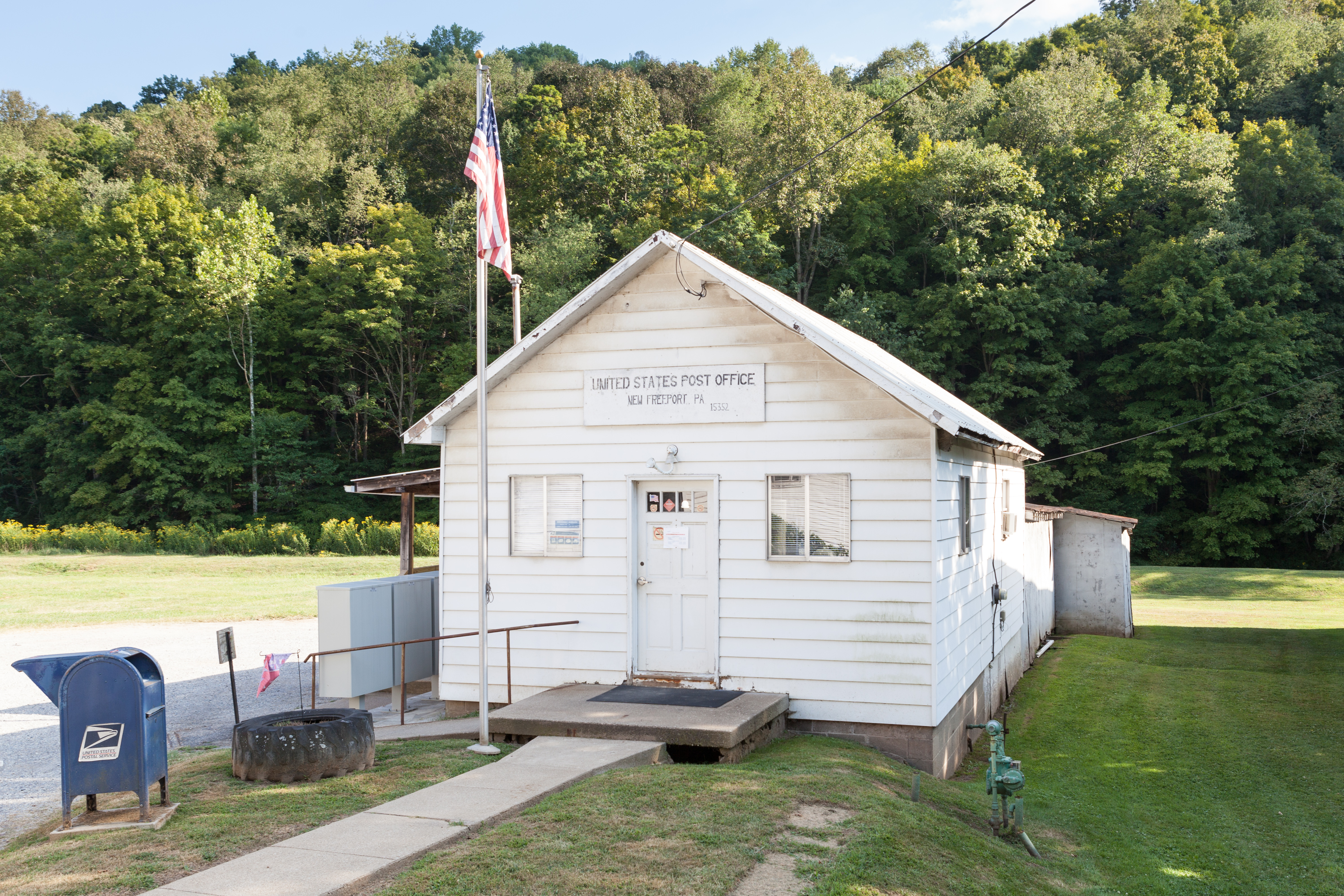
- Post Office

- Location within Pennsylvania Location within the United States
- Coordinates: 39°45′34″N 80°24′40″W
- Country: United States
- State: Pennsylvania
- County: Greene
- Township: Freeport

Area
  - Total: 0.71 sq mi (1.84 km^{2})
  - Land: 0.71 sq mi (1.84 km^{2})
  - Water: 0 sq mi (0.00 km^{2})
- Elevation: 1,050 ft (320 m)

Population (2020)
  - Total: 77
  - Density: 108.2/sq mi (41.76/km^{2})
- Time zone: UTC-5 (Eastern (EST))
  - Summer (DST): UTC-4 (EDT)
- ZIP code: 15352
- FIPS code: 42-53576
- GNIS feature ID: 2630030

New Freeport is an unincorporated community and census-designated place (CDP) in Freeport Township, Greene County, Pennsylvania, in the United States. It is located in the far southwestern corner of Pennsylvania along Pennsylvania Route 18. As of the 2020 Census, the population was 77.

== Demographics ==
Historical population
| Census | Pop. | Note | %± |
|---|---|---|---|
| 2010 | 112 | | — |
| 2020 | 77 | | −31.2% |
U.S. Decennial Census

The 2020 United States census gave the population as 77 people.
