= Sud-Est =

Sud-Est (French for southeast) may refer to:

== Places ==
- Sud-Est (department), Haiti
- Sud-Est (development region), Romania
- Sud Department (Ivory Coast), defunct administrative subdivision of Ivory Coast
- Île Sud-Est, the largest island in the Egmont Islands (Six Iles)

== Companies and transportation ==
- Ferrovie del Sud Est, a railway company
- LGV Sud-Est, a French high-speed train line
- SNCASE (Société Nationale des Constructions Aéronautiques du Sud-Est), a former French aircraft manufacturer
- SNCF TGV Sud-Est, a TGV train

== Other ==
- Sud-Est (magazine)
- 3rei Sud Est, a Romanian band

== See also ==
- Southeast (disambiguation)
