= Freeport Township, Greene County, Pennsylvania =

Township in Pennsylvania, US

Coordinates: 39°44′00″N 80°24′59″W

- Township
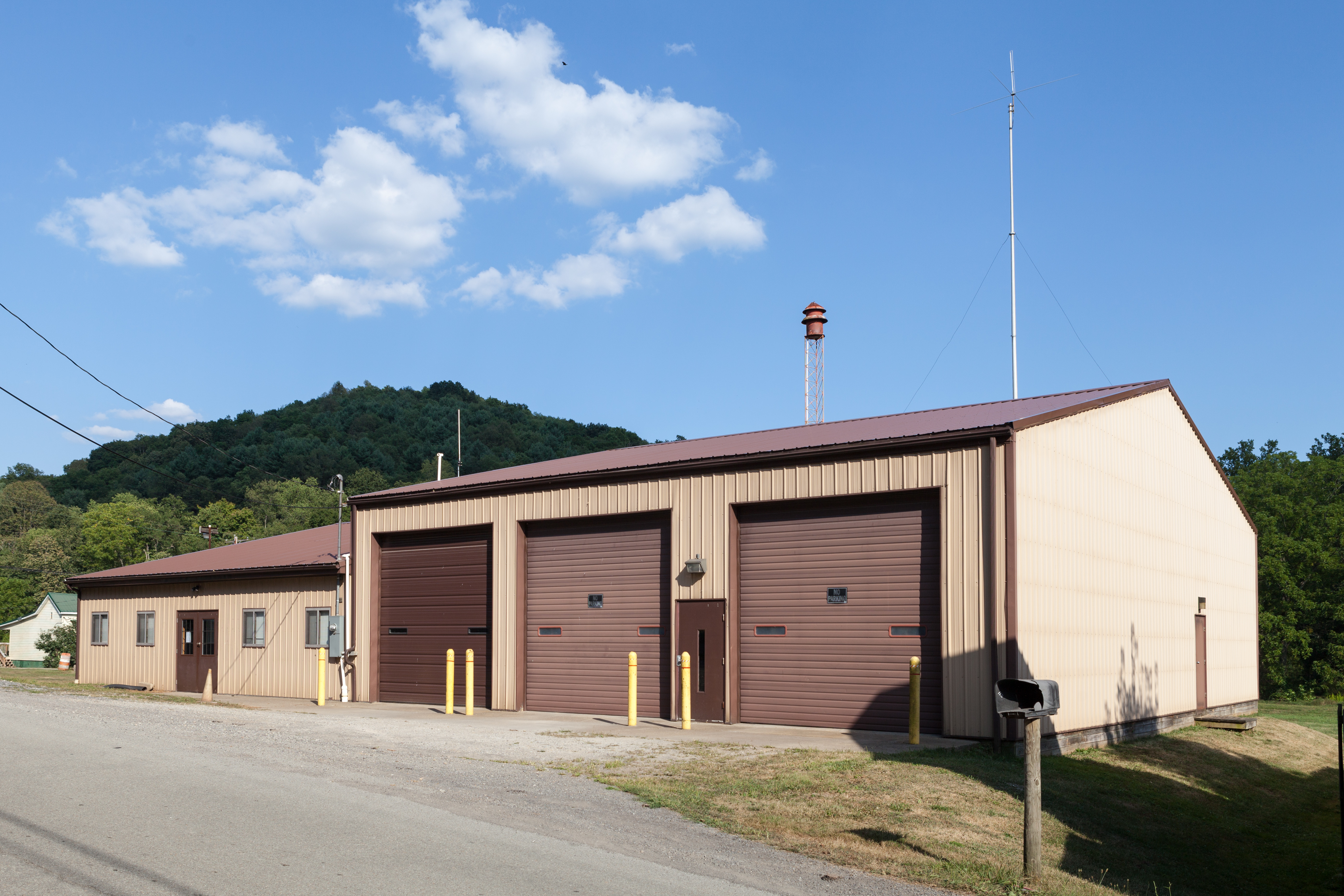
- New Freeport Volunteer Fire Company

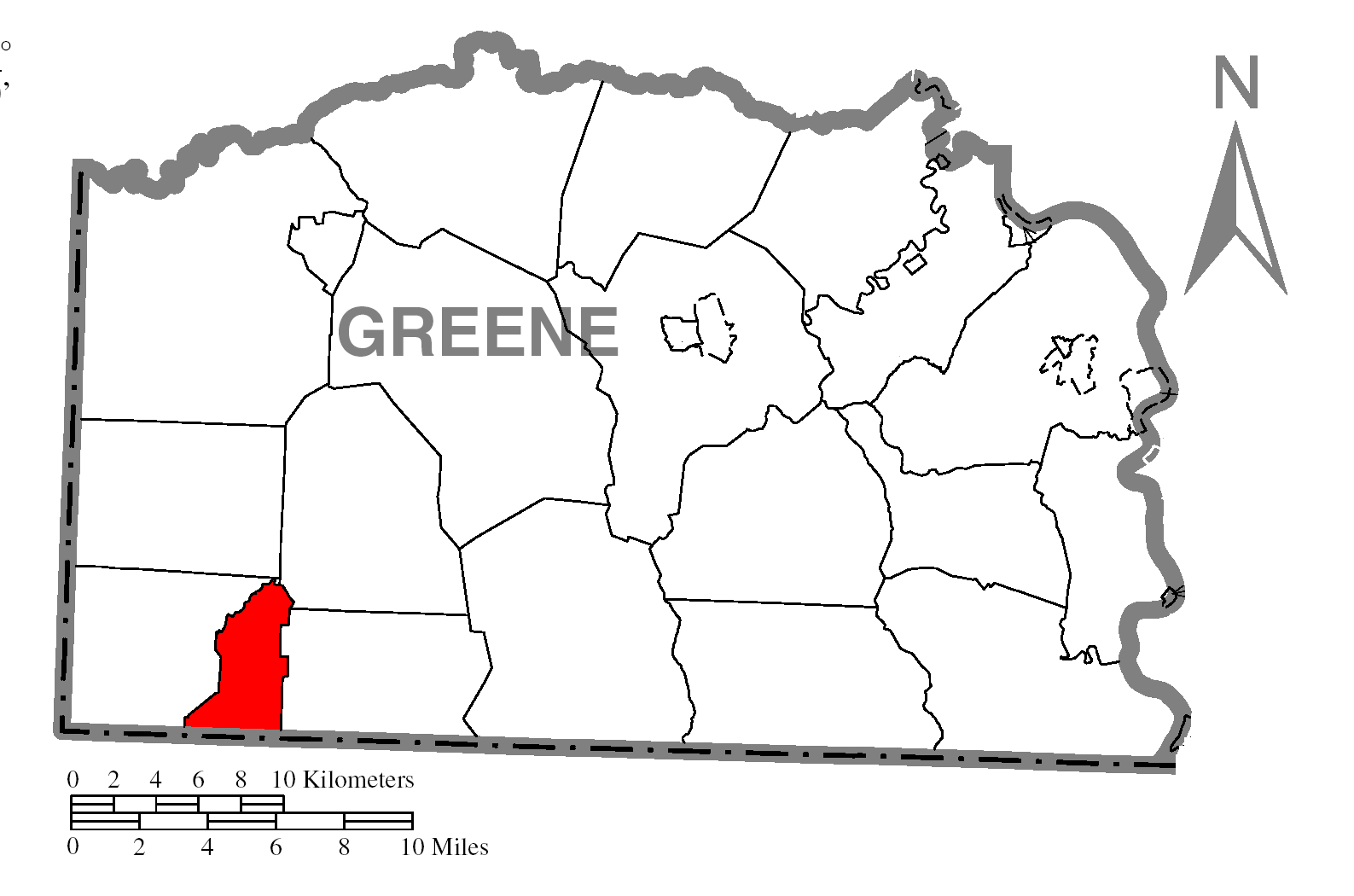
- Location of Freeport Township in Greene County

- Location of Greene County in Pennsylvania
- Country: United States
- State: Pennsylvania
- County: Greene

Area
  - Total: 8.09 sq mi (20.96 km^{2})
  - Land: 8.09 sq mi (20.96 km^{2})
  - Water: 0 sq mi (0.00 km^{2})

Population (2020)
  - Total: 269 ▼
  - Estimate (2023): 258
  - Density: 37.3/sq mi (14.41/km^{2})
- Time zone: UTC-4 (EST)
  - Summer (DST): UTC-5 (EDT)
- Area code: 724
- FIPS code: 42-059-27800

Freeport Township is a township in Greene County, Pennsylvania, United States. The population was 269 at the 2020 census. In June 2025 the township's Board of Supervisors declared a "disaster emergency" which allows it to seek state and federal funds to install a water system after residents complained that their water had been contaminated for over three years, believed to be caused by fracking. Neighboring Springhill Township followed with a similar declaration in August 2025.

== Geography ==
The township is in southwestern Greene County and is bordered to the south by the state of West Virginia. New Freeport is the primary settlement in the township, located in the north along the Pennsylvania Fork of Fish Creek, a westward-flowing tributary of the Ohio River. Garrison is an unincorporated community in the southern part of the township. According to the United States Census Bureau, the township has a total area of 8.1 square miles (21.0 km^{2}), all land.

== Demographics ==
Historical population
Census	Pop.	Note	%±
2000	302		—
2010	310		2.6%
2020	269		−13.2%
2025 (est.)	255		−5.2%
U.S. Decennial Census

As of the census of 2000, there were 302 people, 115 households, and 84 families residing in the township. The population density was 34.9 inhabitants per square mile (13.5/km^{2}). There were 142 housing units at an average density of 16.4/sq mi (6.3/km^{2}). The racial makeup of the township was 99.34% White, 0.33% Native American, and 0.33% from two or more races.

There were 115 households, out of which 31.3% had children under the age of 18 living with them, 57.4% were married couples living together, 12.2% had a female householder with no husband present, and 26.1% were non-families. 21.7% of all households were made up of individuals, and 11.3% had someone living alone who was 65 years of age or older. The average household size was 2.63 and the average family size was 3.08.

In the township the population was spread out, with 26.5% under the age of 18, 7.0% from 18 to 24, 29.1% from 25 to 44, 21.2% from 45 to 64, and 16.2% who were 65 years of age or older. The median age was 37 years. For every 100 females, there were 105.4 males. For every 100 females age 18 and over, there were 85.0 males.

The median income for a household in the township was $22,813, and the median income for a family was $24,844. Males had a median income of $24,844 versus $19,063 for females. The per capita income for the township was $11,731. About 27.3% of families and 33.0% of the population were below the poverty line, including 36.0% of those under the age of 18 and 24.0% of those 65 or over.

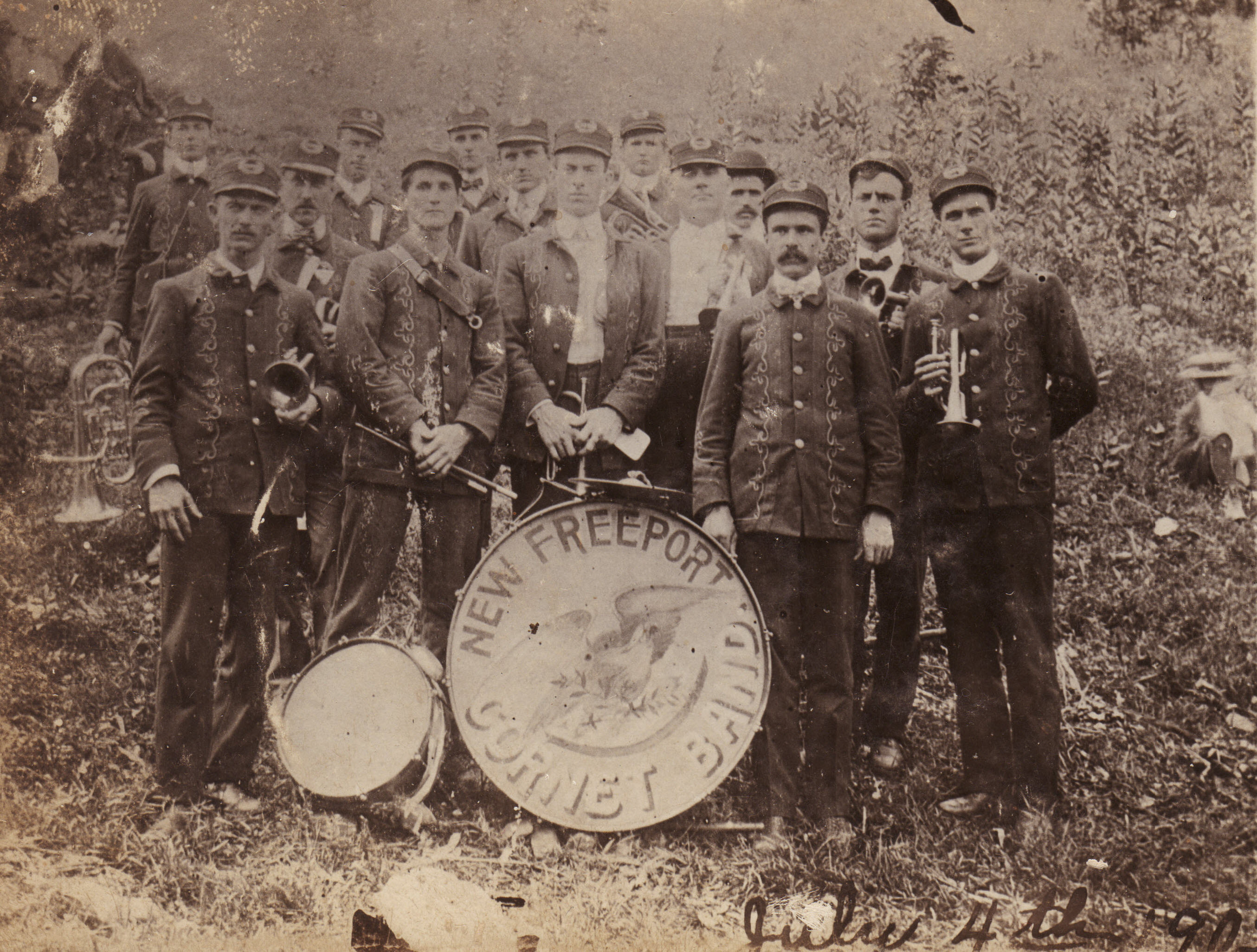
New Freeport Cornet Band c. 1900
