= Surveyor, Pennsylvania =

Unincorporated community in Pennsylvania, U.S.

Coordinates: 41°04′26″N 78°19′32″W

Surveyor is an unincorporated community in Clearfield County, in the U.S. state of Pennsylvania.

== History ==
The community takes its name from nearby Surveyor Run.
