= State Line, Pennsylvania =

There are three unincorporated communities named State Line in the U.S. state of Pennsylvania:

- State Line, Bedford County, Pennsylvania
- State Line, Erie County, Pennsylvania
- State Line, Franklin County, Pennsylvania
