= South East London =

South East London may refer to:

- SE postcode area
- South East (London sub region), a sub region of the London Plan created in 2004 and corresponding to Southwark, Lewisham, Greenwich, Bexley and Bromley
- Eastern part of South London
- London South East (European Parliament constituency)
