= Smoke Run, Pennsylvania =

Unincorporated community in Pennsylvania, US

- Unincorporated community
- Location within Pennsylvania
- Coordinates: 40°47′41″N 78°25′39″W
- Country: United States
- State: Pennsylvania
- County: Clearfield
- Elevation: 1,368 ft (417 m)
- Time zone: UTC-5 (Eastern (EST))
  - Summer (DST): UTC-4 (EDT)
- ZIP code: 16681
- Area code: 814
- GNIS feature ID: 1204675

Smoke Run (also spelled as Smokerun) is an unincorporated community in Clearfield County, Pennsylvania, United States. The community is located along Pennsylvania Route 453, 1.6 miles (2.6 km) west of Ramey. Smoke Run has a post office with ZIP code 16681. The town is a rather small town, with a population in the hundreds, a large amount of the people residing within are of Croatian Descent. In honor of the Croatian settlers that had founded the town, a bar/restaurant named "The Croatian Club" was constructed.
