= Swengel, Pennsylvania =

Unincorporated community in Pennsylvania, US

- Unincorporated community
- Location within Pennsylvania
- Coordinates: 40°53′32″N 77°07′36″W
- Country: United States
- State: Pennsylvania
- County: Union
- Elevation: 617 ft (188 m)
- Time zone: UTC-5 (Eastern (EST))
  - Summer (DST): UTC-4 (EDT)
- ZIP code: 17880
- Area codes: 272 & 570
- GNIS feature ID: 1189178

Swengel is an unincorporated community in Union County, Pennsylvania, United States. The community is 1.7 miles (2.7 km) east-southeast of Hartleton. Swengel has a post office with ZIP code 17880.
