= Strabane, Pennsylvania =

Unincorporated community in Pennsylvania, US

- Unincorporated community
- Location within Pennsylvania
- Coordinates: 40°15′03″N 80°11′52″W
- Country: United States
- State: Pennsylvania
- County: Washington
- Elevation: 1,063 ft (324 m)
- Time zone: UTC-5 (Eastern (EST))
  - Summer (DST): UTC-4 (EDT)
- ZIP code: 15363
- Area codes: 724, 878
- GNIS feature ID: 1188838

Strabane is an unincorporated community in Washington County, Pennsylvania, United States. The community is located along the southern border of Canonsburg and the eastern border of Houston. Strabane has a post office, with ZIP code 15363.

== Demographics ==
Historical population
Census	Pop.	Note	%±

The United States Census Bureau defined Strabane as a census designated place (CDP) in 2023.
