= Summit Mills, Pennsylvania =

- Unincorporated community
- Location within Pennsylvania
- Coordinates: 39°48′32″N 79°04′32″W
- Country: United States
- State: Pennsylvania
- County: Somerset
- Elevation: 2,024 ft (617 m)
- Time zone: UTC-5 (Eastern (EST))
  - Summer (DST): UTC-4 (EDT)
- ZIP code: 15552
- Area code: 814
- GNIS feature ID: 1189048

Summit Mills is an unincorporated community in Somerset County, Pennsylvania, United States. The community is 3 miles (4.8 km) west of Meyersdale.

== Postal history ==
The first postmaster in Summit Mills was Ephraim Miller, appointed November 24, 1852. Summit Mills had a post office through at least 1906, but was served by the post office in Meyersdale by 1909.

== Religious history ==
Early settlers of Summit Mills, including the Yoder and Hostetler families, were Amish. A congregation of Church of the Brethren was organized in Summit Mills in the fall of 1883 and a church was built in 1884.
