= Stoverstown, Pennsylvania =

Unincorporated community in Pennsylvania, U.S.

Coordinates: 39°53′03″N 76°49′02″W

Stoverstown is an unincorporated community in York County, Pennsylvania, United States. Stoverstown is located off Pennsylvania Route 616, two miles outside New Salem.

== History ==
Because there was another location in Pennsylvania with the same name, the post office in Stoverstown was named Okete from May 28, 1886, until November 30, 1907. Currently, the Stoverstown population is approximately 76 people. A community building/fire hall was built by the local residents by hand in the mid-1900s. The firehall has been recently purchased by a local business to adapt and reuse it as a community center once again. A new fire station was built in the 1990s to serve the local community. More information about early Stoverstown is available at the York County Historical Society.
