= Surveyor Run =

Stream in Pennsylvania, U.S.

Coordinates: 41.0737°N 78.3277°W

Surveyor Run is a stream in the U.S. state of Pennsylvania. It is a tributary to the West Branch Susquehanna River.

Surveyor Run was named from a pioneer incident when a surveyor and his party became lost near the stream's course. The name sometimes is written "Surveyors Run".
