= Springhill Township, Greene County, Pennsylvania =

Township in Pennsylvania, US

Coordinates: 39°45′32″N 80°28′34″W

- Township
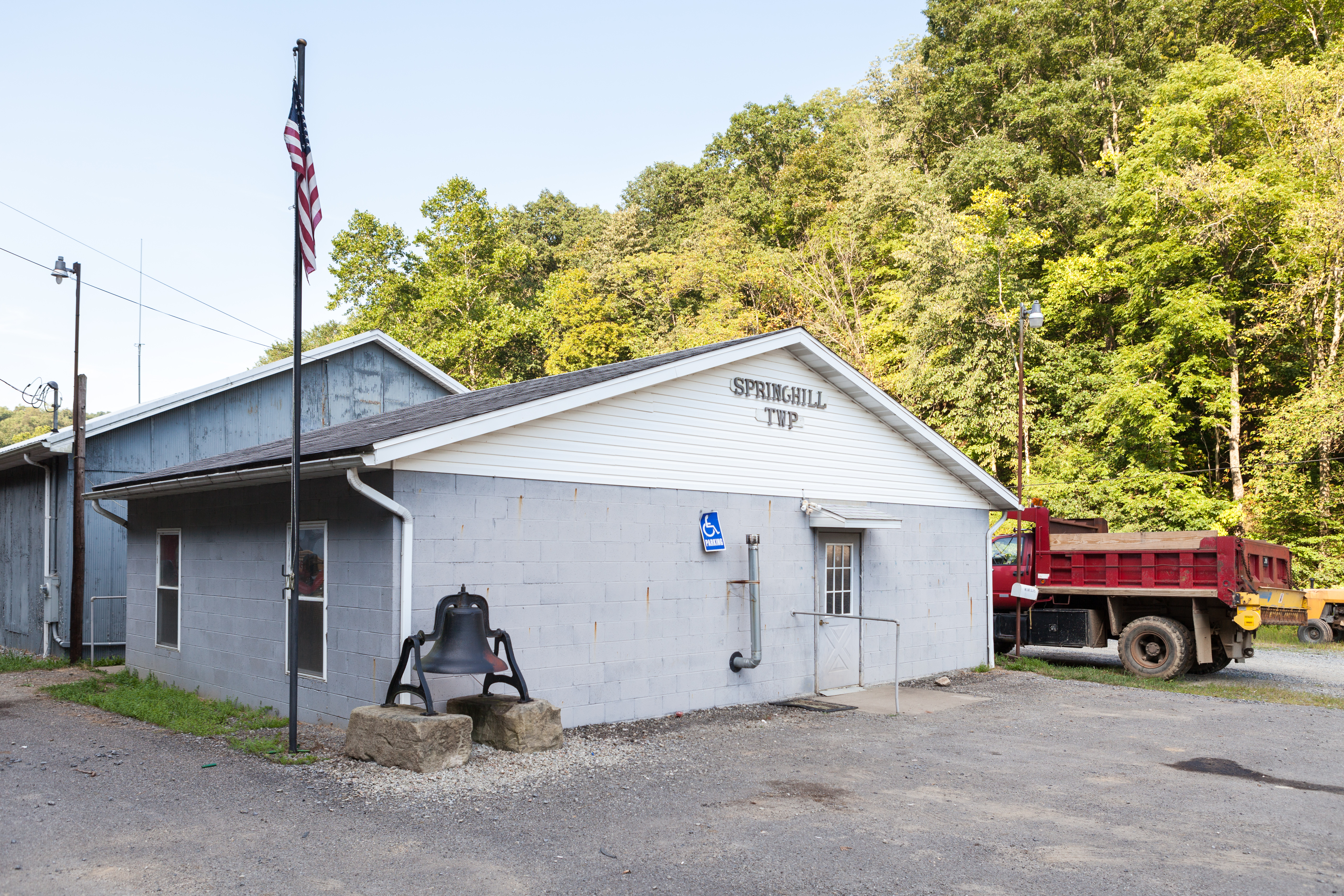
- Municipal Building

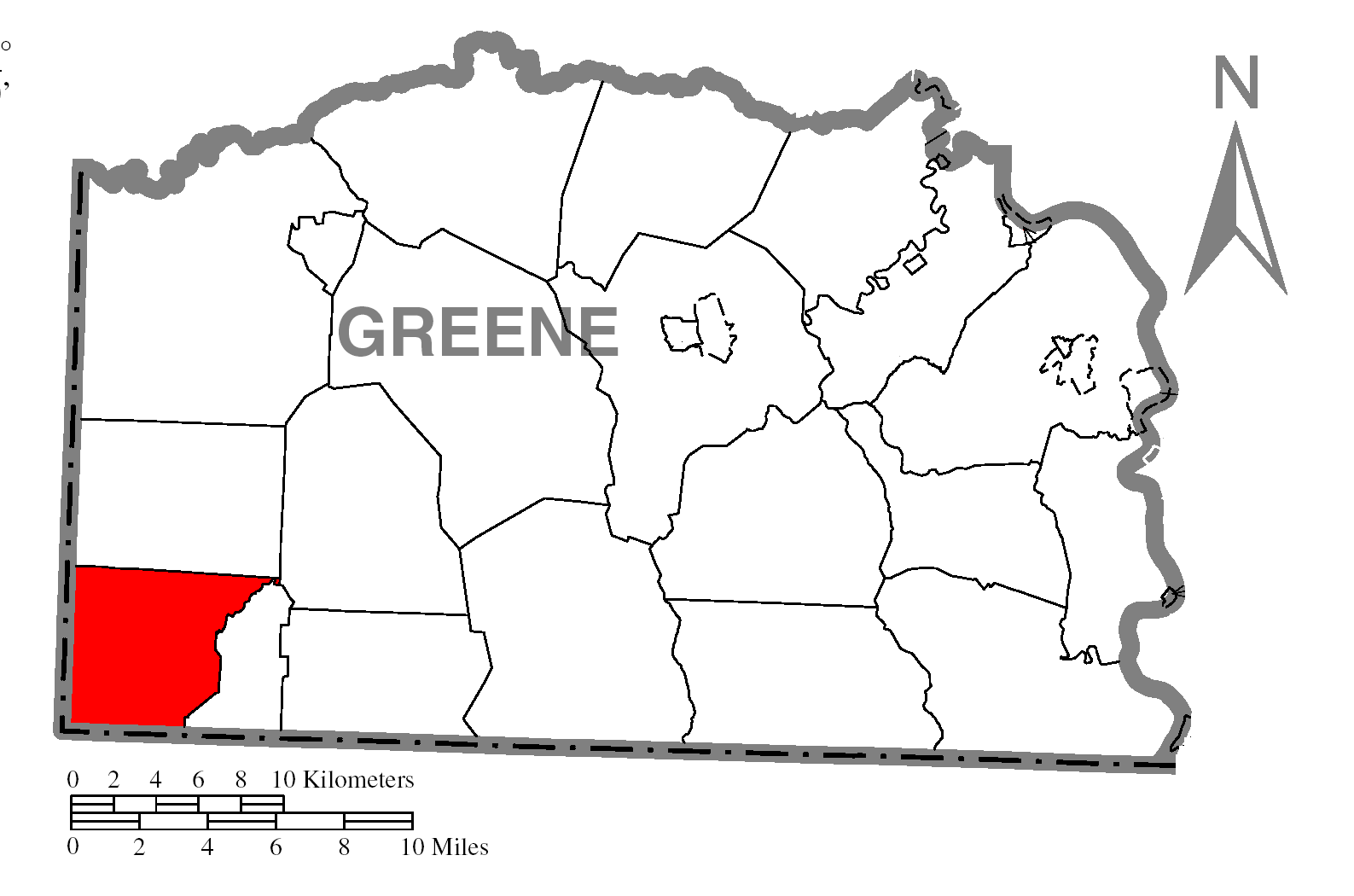
- Location of Springhill Township in Greene County

- Location of Greene County in Pennsylvania
- Country: United States
- State: Pennsylvania
- County: Greene

Area
  - Total: 21.96 sq mi (56.88 km^{2})
  - Land: 21.95 sq mi (56.86 km^{2})
  - Water: 0.0077 sq mi (0.02 km^{2})

Population (2020)
  - Total: 322 ▼
  - Estimate (2023): 305
  - Density: 15.3/sq mi (5.91/km^{2})
- Time zone: UTC-4 (EST)
  - Summer (DST): UTC-5 (EDT)
- Area code: 724
- FIPS code: 42-059-73248

Springhill Township is a township in Greene County, Pennsylvania, United States. The population was 322 at the time of the 2020 census, a decline from the figure of 349 that was documented by the 2010 census.

In August 2025 the township's Board of Supervisors declared a "disaster emergency" which allows it to seek state and federal funds to install a water system after residents complained that their water had been contaminated for over three years, believed to be caused by fracking. Neighboring Freeport Township had made a similar declaration in June 2025.

== Geography ==
The township is located in the southwestern corner of Greene County and the southwestern corner of Pennsylvania. It is bordered to the south and the west by West Virginia.

According to the United States Census Bureau, the township has a total area of 22.0 square miles (56.9 km^{2}), of which 0.01 square miles (0.02 km^{2}), or 0.03%, is water.

Deep Valley, along the Pennsylvania Fork of Fish Creek, is the primary settlement in this township. Bissett Run is a stream that flows near Deep Valley.

== Demographics ==
Historical population
| Census | Pop. | Note | %± |
|---|---|---|---|
| 2000 | 476 | | — |
| 2010 | 349 | | −26.7% |
| 2020 | 322 | | −7.7% |
| 2025 (est.) | 301 | | −6.5% |
U.S. Decennial Census

As of the census of 2000, there were 476 people, 169 households, and 129 families in the township.

The population density was 21.5 people per square mile (8.3/km^{2}). There were 224 housing units at an average density of 10.1/sq mi (3.9/km^{2}).

The racial makeup of the township was 98.74% White, 0.42% Native American, and 0.84% from two or more races.

There were 169 households, out of which 40.8% had children under the age of 18 living with them; 55.6% were married couples living together, 15.4% had a female householder with no husband present, and 23.1% were non-families. 16.6% of all households were made up of individuals, and 10.7% had someone living alone who was 65 years of age or older.

The average household size was 2.82 and the average family size was 3.13.

Within the township, the population was spread out, with 30.5% of residents who were under the age of 18, 6.1% from 18 to 24, 30.7% from 25 to 44, 22.3% from 45 to 64, and 10.5% who were 65 years of age or older. The median age was 33 years.

For every 100 females, there were 91.2 males. For every 100 females aged 18 or older, there were 90.2 males.

The median income for a household in the township was $18,393, and the median income for a family was $22,857. Males had a median income of $36,250 versus $20,781 for females.

The per capita income for the township was $10,364.

Approximately 27.9% of families and 37.2% of the population were living below the poverty line, including 53.6% of those under the age of 18 and 19.7% of those aged 65 or older.
