= Strickler, Pennsylvania =

Unincorporated area in Pennsylvania, US

- Unincorporated community
- Location within Pennsylvania Location within the United States
- Coordinates: 40°00′40″N 76°33′04″W
- Country: United States
- State: Pennsylvania
- County: York
- Elevation: 302 ft (92 m)
- Time zone: UTC-5 (Eastern (EST))
  - Summer (DST): UTC-4 (EDT)
- Area codes: 717 & 223
- GNIS feature ID: 1204760

Strickler is an unincorporated community in York County, Pennsylvania, United States.
