= South Bend, Pennsylvania =

Unincorporated community in Pennsylvania, US

South Bend
- Unincorporated community
- Location within the state of Pennsylvania South Bend (the United States)
- Coordinates: 40°37′40″N 79°22′10″W
- Country: United States
- State: Pennsylvania
- County: Armstrong
- Township: South Bend
- Elevation: 961 ft (293 m)
- Time zone: UTC-5 (Eastern (EST))
  - Summer (DST): UTC-4 (EDT)
- GNIS feature ID: 1188012

South Bend is an unincorporated community located within South Bend Township, Armstrong County, Pennsylvania, United States.

== History ==
A post office called South Bend was established in 1848 and remained in operation until 1959.
