= South-East, Russian SFSR =

The South-East (Russian: Ю́го-Восто́к), also referred to as South-Eastern Krai (Ю́го-Восто́чный край) and South-Eastern Oblast (Ю́го-Восто́чная о́бласть) was a territory, and later an administrative division, of the Russian Soviet Federative Socialist Republic (RSFSR) which existed in 1920-1924.

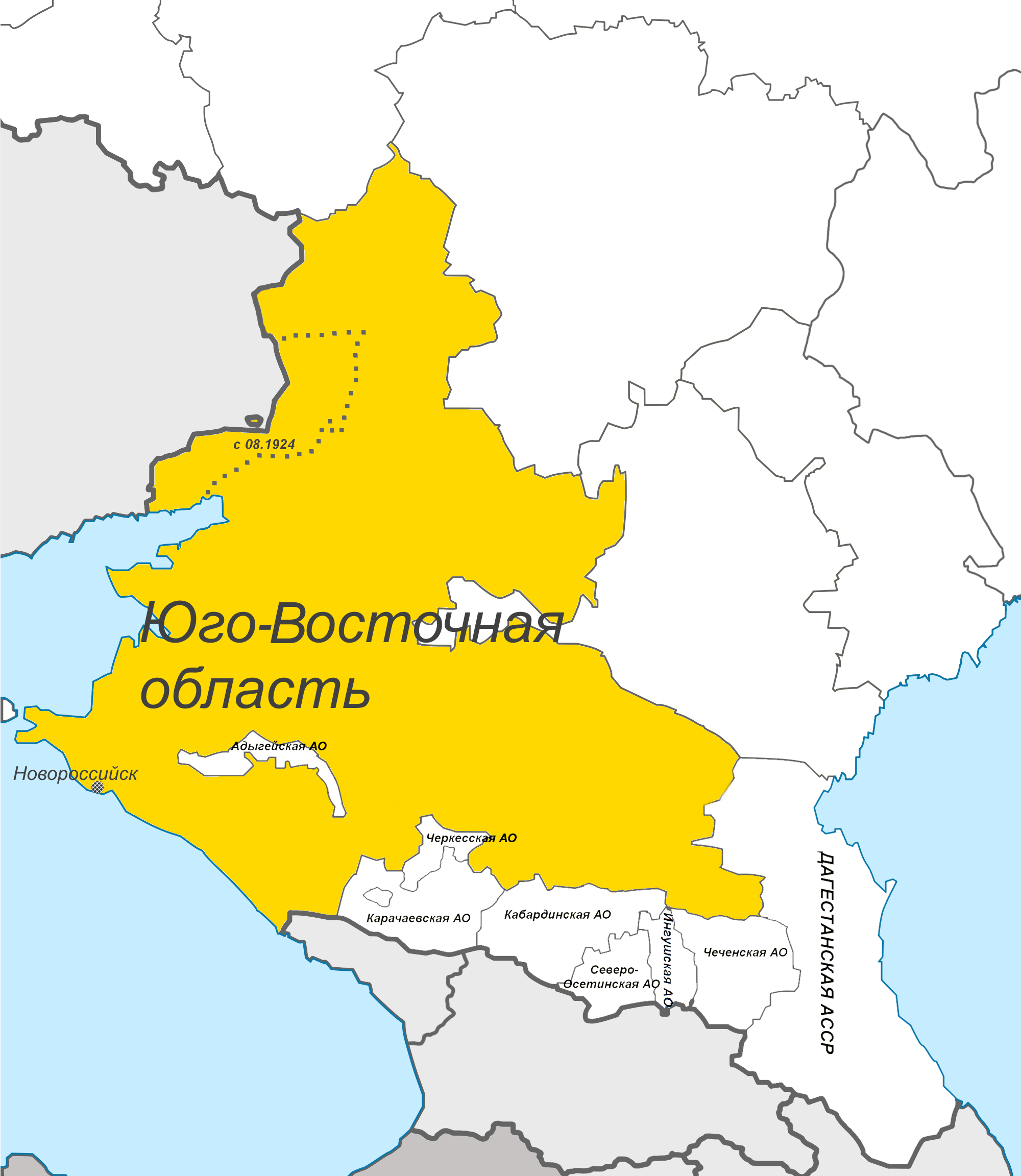
The 1924 map showing the entity as "South-Eastern Oblast"

Originally, the name "South-East" was used informally to refer to the territories of Don, Kuban-Black Sea, and Terek Oblasts, as well as those of Stavropol Governorate and Dagestan ASSR, which were governed by the Revolutionary Soviet of the Laborers' Army of South-East Russia (hence the name "South-East") established on August 7, 1920. While the Soviet itself was abolished in 1921, the name "South-East" stuck. Occasionally, the territory was also referred to as "South-Eastern Krai" and "South-Eastern Oblast", even though no official krai/oblast status was assigned to it at the time.

The system of the administrative and territorial division of the RSFSR was developing haphazardly in the beginning of the 1920s: it was inconsistent, expensive to maintain, and not very effective in practice. As a reaction to that, the 12th Congress of the Russian Communist Party (Bolsheviks) on April 23, 1924 decided to test a new system of the administrative division in two experimental areas: one industrially developed and one agricultural. The South-East became a testing ground for the new system in the agricultural area. On February 13, 1924, the All-Russian Central Executive Committee (VTsIK) officially defined the South-East as the area comprising the territories of Don and Kuban Oblasts, Terek and Stavropol Governorates, the city of Grozny, and Kabardino-Balkar, Karachay-Cherkess, Adyghe-Cherkess, and Chechen Autonomous Oblasts and mandated its division into districts (raions) by the end of 1924. On June 2, 1924, the Presidium of the VTsIK established a list of the new okrugs and districts into which the "South-Eastern Krai (Oblast)" was to be divided. At the same time, Kuban-Black Sea Oblast was abolished and replaced with four new okrugs, which were further divided into districts by the Executive Committee of Kuban-Black Sea Oblast on July 19, 1924.

South-Eastern Krai was renamed North Caucasus Krai by the Resolution of the Presidium of the VTsIK of October 16, 1924 and by the Resolution of the Krai Executive Committee of November 16, 1924.
