= State Line, Bedford County, Pennsylvania =

Unincorporated community in Pennsylvania, US

- Unincorporated community
- Location within the state of Pennsylvania State Line (the United States)
- Coordinates: 39°43′30″N 78°46′3″W
- Country: United States
- State: Pennsylvania
- County: Bedford
- Township: Londonderry
- Elevation: 732 ft (223 m)
- Time zone: UTC-5 (Eastern (EST))
  - Summer (DST): UTC-4 (EDT)
- GNIS feature ID: 1188550

State Line is an unincorporated community in Bedford County, Pennsylvania, United States. It is located just north of Cumberland and Frostburg, Maryland.
