= Southwest, Pennsylvania =

Unincorporated community in Pennsylvania, US

Southwest
- Unincorporated community
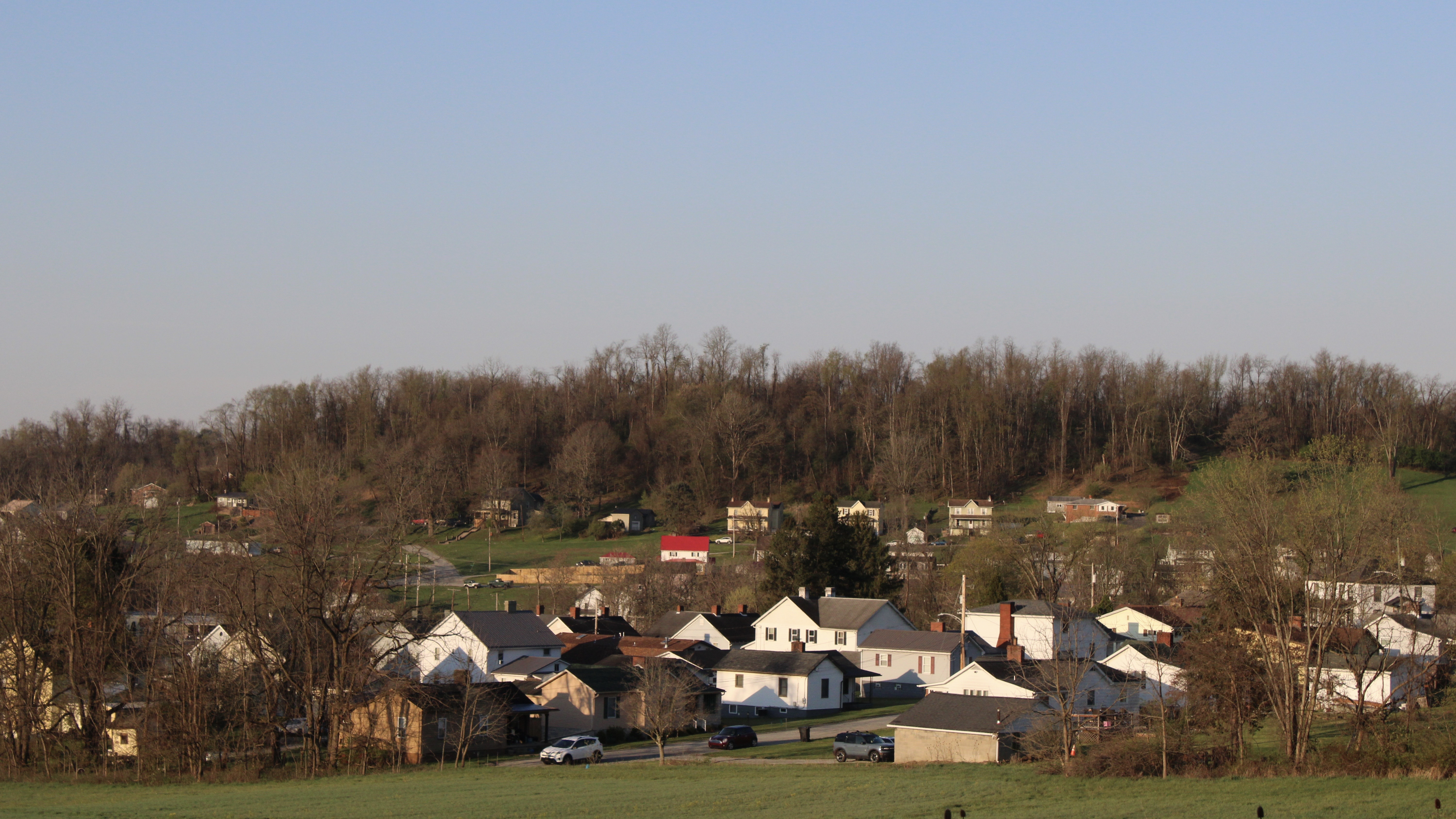
- Homes in Southwest

- Location within the state of Pennsylvania Southwest (the United States)
- Coordinates: 40°11′56″N 79°31′15″W
- Country: United States
- State: Pennsylvania
- County: Westmoreland
- Time zone: UTC-5 (Eastern (EST))
  - Summer (DST): UTC-4 (EDT)

Southwest is an unincorporated community in Westmoreland County, Pennsylvania, United States near Pennsylvania Route 981. It has the ZIP code 15685.
