= Southeastern, Pennsylvania =

USPS Processing and Distribution Center

Southeastern Pennsylvania Processing & Distribution Center
- Location within Pennsylvania
- Alternative names: Southeastern, PA; Post Office

General information
- Location: 1000 W. Valley Road, Wayne, PA, USA
- Coordinates: 40°4′14″N 75°25′38″W

Southeastern is a United States Postal Service Sorting and Delivery Center (S&DC) in Tredyffrin Township, Chester County, Pennsylvania, United States, near Devon, which has been open since February 2024. Southeastern was previously a Processing and Distribution Center (P&DC) up until 2012, when it was closed. It was primarily known for its postmark on mail originating in many regional ZIP codes. There is a retail post office co-located at the S&DC.

== History and notable features ==
Many bills for Verizon Communications and Comcast as well as statements from The Vanguard Group are sent from this post office. Videos for Netflix were also sent from this post office for customers in the Philadelphia region. This post office served as the regional mail center for the 193xx group of zip codes and post offices, and much of the mail from this area to the rest of the country bore a Southeastern, PA 193xx postmark instead of the actual zip code of origin.

Before closing, Southeastern processing was being studied for consolidation with other facilities due to the excess capacity in the postal network. On September 8, 2010, notice was given to the postal union of a possible consolidation with the Lehigh Valley P&DC. On September 15, 2011, the USPS announced that it was studying a consolidation into the Philadelphia P&DC. A public meeting was held on January 3, 2012. According to a published summary of the study, "retail and other services currently available at the Southeastern facility will not change at this time."

The Southeastern P&DC was consolidated into the Philadelphia P&DC in 2012–2013.

On February 24, 2024, the USPS reopened the Southeastern P&DC building and repurposed it into a sorting and delivery center (S&DC), consolidating several nearby delivery unit operations into the building.
