= Springtown, Franklin County, Pennsylvania =

Unincorporated community in Pennsylvania, U.S.

Coordinates: 40°04′50″N 77°49′11″W

Springtown is an unincorporated community in Franklin County, in the U.S. state of Pennsylvania.

== History ==
In 1878, Springtown had about 20 inhabitants.
