= List of ghost towns in Pennsylvania =

This is an incomplete list of ghost towns in Pennsylvania.

Many of the ghost towns in Pennsylvania are located in Western Pennsylvania, particularly in the Appalachian and Allegheny regions of the Rust Belt. During the late 19th century and early 20th century, the mountainous parts of Pennsylvania were home to a booming coal industry. Many of these towns also housed coking facilities for the coal mined nearby, many of which still have the remains of the abandoned coke ovens.

== Classifications ==
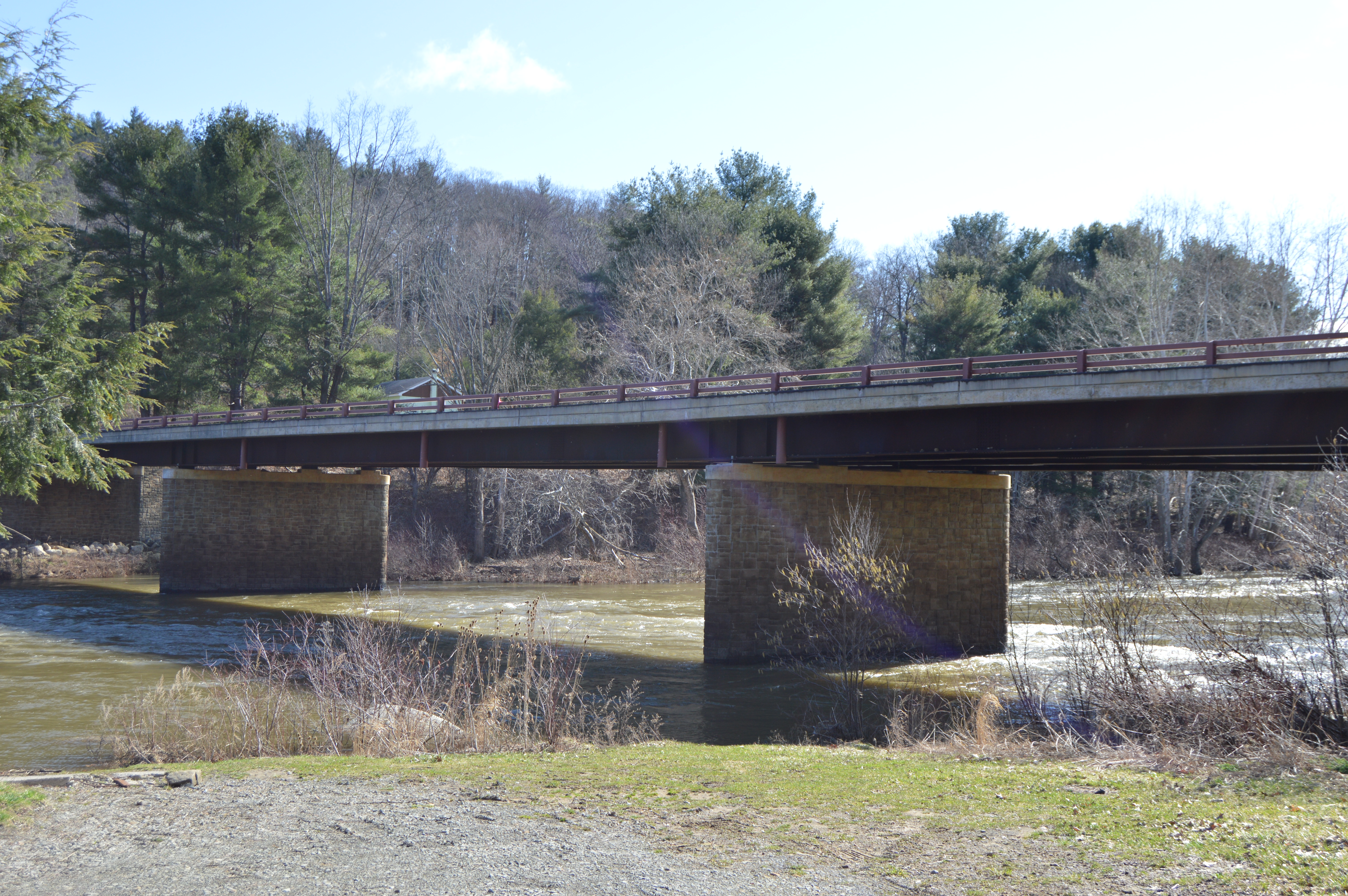
The bridge at Arroyo

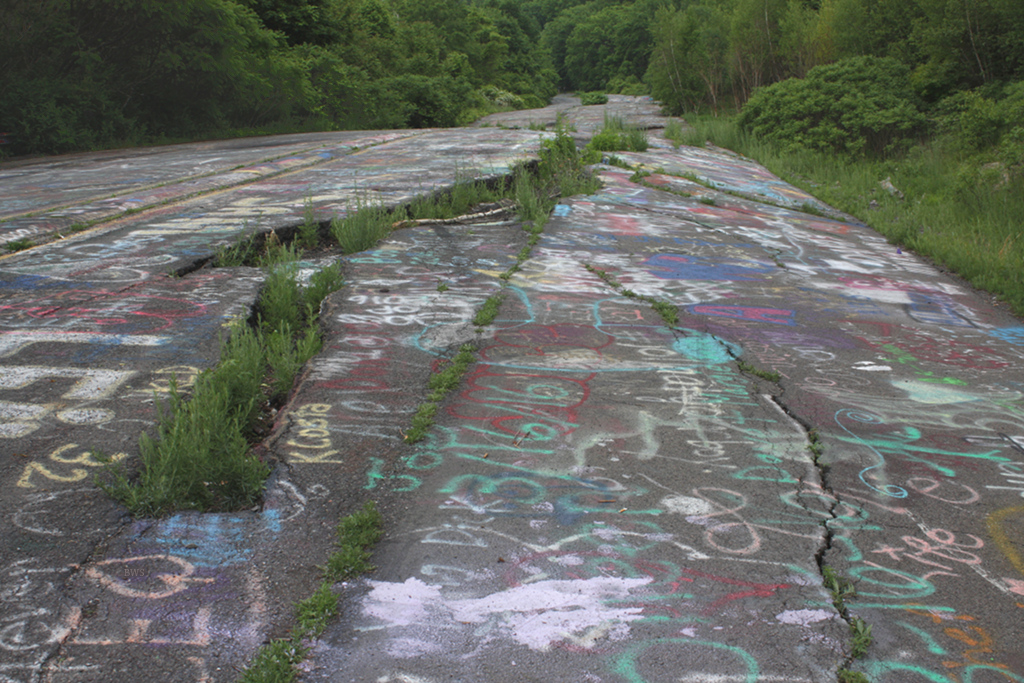
The famous graffiti highway in Centralia

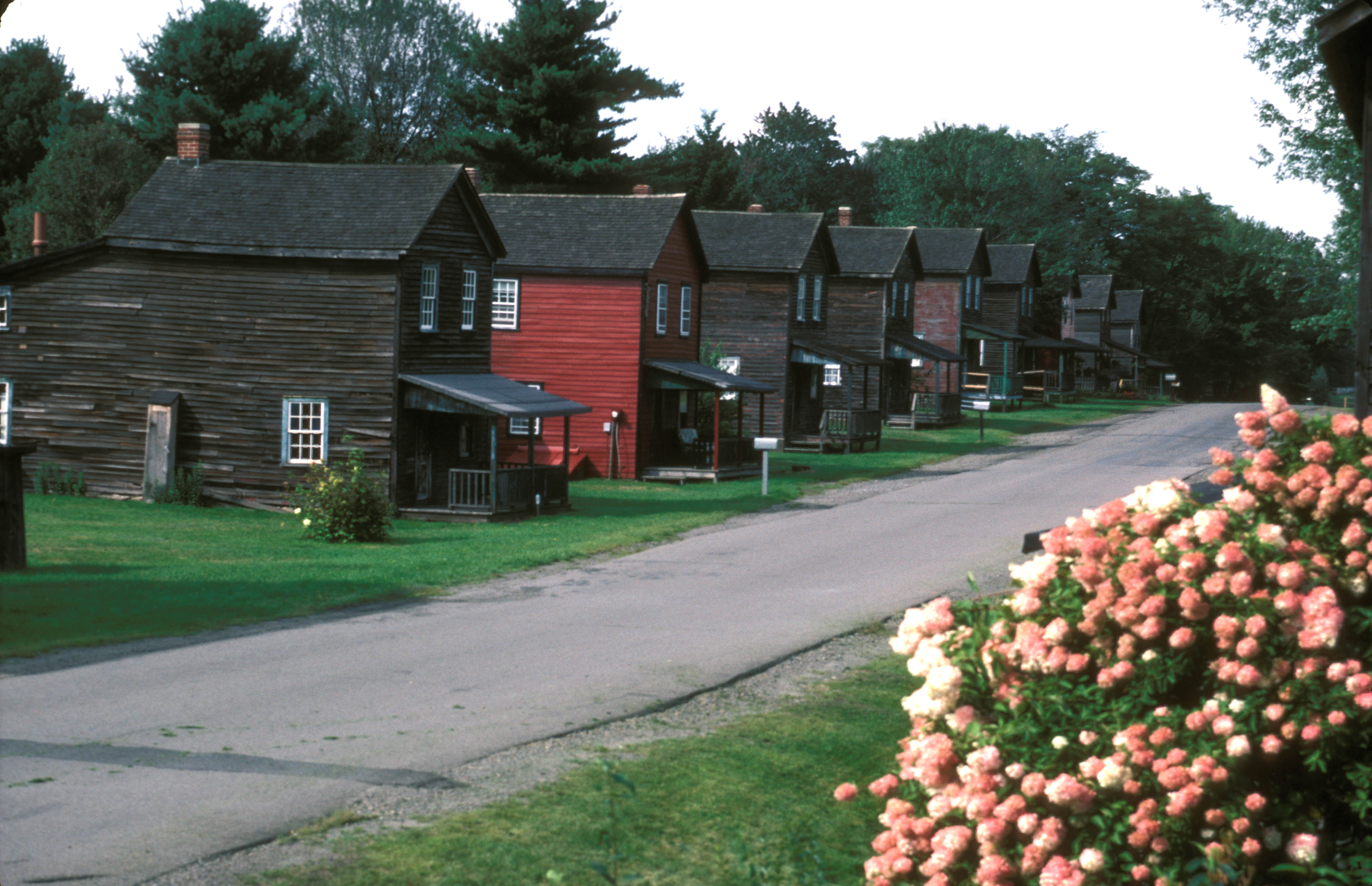
Restored 19th century buildings at Eckley

=== Barren site ===
- Sites no longer in existence
- Sites that have been destroyed
- Covered with water
- Reverted to pasture
- May have a few difficult to find foundations/footings at most

=== Neglected site ===
- Only rubble left
- All buildings uninhabited
- Roofless building ruins
- Some buildings or houses still standing, but majority are roofless

=== Abandoned site ===
- Building or houses still standing
- Buildings and houses all abandoned
- No population, except caretaker
- Site no longer in existence except for one or two buildings, for example old church, grocery store

=== Semi-abandoned site ===
- Building or houses still standing
- Buildings and houses largely abandoned
- Few residents
- Many abandoned buildings
- Small population

=== Historic community ===
- Building or houses still standing
- Still a busy community
- Smaller than its boom years
- Population has decreased dramatically, to one fifth or less.

== List of towns ==
| Name | Other names | County | Township | Settled | Abandoned | Current status | Remarks |
|---|---|---|---|---|---|---|---|
| Acme | | Westmoreland /Fayette counties | Donegal, Mount Pleasant (Westmoreland) Bullskin (Fayette) | | | | |
| Aitch | | Huntingdon County | | 1887 | | Submerged | Submerged to form Raystown Lake. |
| Alice | | Westmoreland County | East Huntingdon Township | | | | |
| Alvira | Wisetown | Union County | Gregg Township | | | | |
| Andrico | | Westmoreland County | Derry Township | | | | |
| Antwerp | | Clarion County | Richland Township | | | | |
| Appalacha | | Indiana County | White Township | | | | |
| Aqueduct | | Indiana County | West Wheatfield Township | | | | |
| Ardara | | Westmoreland County | North Huntingdon Township | | | | |
| Armerford | | Indiana County | East Wheatfield Township | | | | Lies along the Ghost Town Trail in East Wheatfield Township in Indiana County. |
| Arroyo | | Elk County | Spring Creek Township | | | | |
| Bagdad | | Westmoreland County | Allegheny Township | | | | |
| Bairdstown | | Westmoreland County | Derry Township | | | | |
| Barclay | | Bradford County | Franklin Township | | | | |
| Bells Mills | | Indiana County | Blacklick Township | | | | |
| Beaver City | Beaver | Clarion County | Beaver Township | 1874 | | Historic | A medium sized oil boom town of around 750 people. Known for having a strong temperance movement. |
| Bennington | | Cambria/Blair County | Allegheny Township | | | | |
| Bergonot | | Elk | Jones Township, Elk County, Pennsylvania | | | | Under East Branch Clarion River Lake |
| Beula | | Cambria County | | 1796 | 1804 | | Welsh religious ghost town. |
| Big Creek Valley | | Carbon County | | | 1966 | Submerged | Submerged to form Beltzville Lake. |
| Big Run | | Elk County | | | | | |
| Billmeyer | Billmyer | Lancaster County | | | | | |
| Blairfour | | Blair County | | | | | The site of a quarry for Blair Limestone Company. |
| Blue Rock | | Elk County | | | | | Along the Clarion-Little Toby Trail, connected to Ellmont, another ghost town, by the local landmark Blue Rock Swinging Bridge. |
| Bracken | | Indiana County | | | | | A coal mining ghost town along the Ghost Town Trail. |
| Braddock | | Allegheny County | N/A | | | Semi-abandoned | Notorious for its crumbling infrastructure and "post-apocalyptic" appearance. |
| Brownsville | | Fayette County | N/A | | | Historic | |
| Buena Vista | | Indiana County | Brush Valley Township | | | | |
| Byrnesville | | Columbia County | Conyngham Township | | | | |
| Cardiff | | | | | | | Located along the Ghost Town Trail |
| Celestia | | Sullivan County | | | 1887 | | A religious community of Millennialists. |
| Centralia | | Columbia County | | | | Semi-abandoned | A coal mining ghost town, where a fire has been burning underground for years |
| Cereal | Lindencross | Westmoreland County | North Huntingdon Township | | | | Was a major location for breakfast cereal production plants starting in 1904 until the factories closed for good in the 1940s. |
| Chester | Humphries | Westmoreland County | Derry Township | 1644 | | | A coal mining ghost town, often known as Humphries after the owner of the mine. |
| Claghorn | | Indiana County | East Wheatfield Township | | | | Along the Ghost Town Trail |
| Cokeville | Broad Fording | Westmoreland County | Derry Township | | | Submerged | a Pennsylvania Canal & coal mining ghost town, under the waters of Conemaugh River Lake. |
| Cold Spring | | Lebanon County | Cold Spring Township | | | | A township that has not had any staff or budget in the municipal government since the 1960s. |
| Concrete City | | Luzerne County | | | | Historic | |
| Corduroy | | Elk County | Highland Township | | | | Located on the Clarion River near Rushland. |
| Corydon | | McKean County | Corydon Township | | | Submerged | Flooded by Allegheny Reservoir |
| Cressonville | Branch Township | Schuylkill County | | | | | |
| Crum | Crumb, Crumtown | Somerset County | | Before 1833 | 1926 | Neglected | Almost all of the buildings in Crum were bought out in the late 1920s by the Berwind Corporation to keep pollution out of their watershed. |
| Crunkleton | | Franklin County | | 1772 | | Barren | A colonial hamlet between Greencastle and Waynesboro. |
| Dahoga | | Elk County | Jones Township | | | | |
| Dias | | Indiana County | Brush Valley Township | | | | A coal town on the Ghost Town Trail. |
| Dilltown | | Indiana County | Buffington Township | | | | Once an important commerce center, now sparsely populated. |
| Dunbar | Frogtown | Fayette County | N/A | | | Historic | |
| East Fork Road District | | Potter County | | | | Absorbed | |
| Eckley | | Luzerne County | Foster Township | | | Historic | a coal mining ghost town, now a coal mining museum |
| Edgerton | | Lackawanna County | | | | | A coal mining ghost town. |
| Edri | | Indiana County | Conemaugh Township | | | | A coal mining ghost town. |
| Eleanora | | Jefferson County | McCalmont Township | | | | A coal and coke company town. |
| Elk City | Kiser/Tilt-Top | Clarion County | Elk Township | 1875 | | Historic | A large oil boom town. In 1877, the city's population reached 2,500-3,000 people. By 1881, the town had turned into a much smaller village of 494 people. |
| Ellmont | | Elk County/Jefferson County | | | | | A logging town famous for a rope bridge, Blue Rock Swinging Bridge, which connects it to another ghost town, Blue Rock. |
| Emmons | | Sullivan County | Davidson Township | | | | Former lumber town. |
| Empire | | Elk County | | | | | A logging town with a railroad tunnel. |
| Eriton | | Clearfield County | Sandy Township | | | | A coal mining ghost town. |
| Fairbanks | | Westmoreland County | Loyalhanna Township | | | | A coal mining ghost town. |
| Ferrier | | Indiana County | Brush Valley Township | | | | A coal mining ghost town. |
| Fillmore | | Indiana County | Blacklick Township | | | Submerged | Formerly along the banks of the Conemaugh River, submerged under the waters of Conemaugh River Lake after construction of the Conemaugh Dam. |
| Forest Home | Forest City | Clarion County | Beaver Township | 1876 | 1885 | Barren | A notably pleasant oil town with a population of around 500 people. It was located near an Antwerp pump station. |
| Fort Palmer | | Westmoreland County | Fairfield Township | 1771 | | | |
| Foster | | Indiana County | Conemaugh Township | | | | A coal mining ghost town. |
| Foxtown | | Westmoreland County | Hempfield Township | | | | A coal mining ghost town. |
| French Azilum | | Bradford County | | 1793 | | | |
| Freytown | | Lackawanna County | | | | | |
| Frick's Lock | | Chester County | East Coventry Township | | | | |
| Frogtown | | Westmoreland County | Salem Township | | | | A coal mining ghost town |
| Fullerton | | Clarion County | Richland Township | | | Neglected | Located next to the Allegheny Valley Railroad between Emlenton and Foxburg. The town existed to support the storage and transportation of oil. |
| Gold Mine | | | | | | | |
| Gazzam | | Clearfield County | Jordan Township | | | | Former mining town which was named after Joseph M. Gazzam, a state senator and an incorporator of the Beech Creek Railroad. |
| Grays Run | | | | | | | An obscure logging town. |
| Greenwood Furnace | | Huntingdon County | Jackson Township | | | | Formerly home to a booming iron industry, the town declined after new techniques rendered its facilities obsolete. |
| Hart Town | | Indiana County | Young Township | | | | Once a coal mining town, the mines at Hart Town had closed by the start of World War II. |
| Hazel Hurst | | McKean County | | | | | Once an important glass production town with multiple factories, all of which are now closed. |
| Helvetia | | Clearfield County | Brady Township | | | | A coal mining ghost town |
| Hicks Run | | Cameron County | | 1904 | 1912 | Barren | A logging town located near Route 555 in Driftwood. |
| Holbrook | | Greene County | | | | Abandoned | Although the greater Holbrook area still has residents, the village proper is almost entirely abandoned. |
| Horatio | | Jefferson County | Young Township | | | | coal mining ghost town |
| Howe Farm | | Clarion County | Beaver Township, Ashland Township | 1877 | 1878 | Barren | A small, short-lived oil boom town. |
| Huron | | Westmoreland County | Salem Township | | | | A coal mining ghost town. |
| Ingleby | Fowler | Centre County | Haines Township | | | | |
| Instanter | | Elk County | | | | Submerged | Under the waters of East Branch Lake. |
| Jefferson City | Jefferson | Clarion County | Beaver Township | 1876 | 1882 | Barren | Former oil town of 1,000 people. |
| Johnetta | | Armstrong County | Gilpin Township | | | | A brick works & coal mining ghost town |
| Joller | | Huntingdon County | | 1916 | 1979 | Barren | A coal mining ghost town. |
| Kelly's Station | Tunnelton | Indiana County | Conemaugh Township | | | | Former town along the Conemaugh River |
| Kinzua | | Warren County | | | 1963 | | see also Kinzua Creek |
| Lackawanna No. 3 | | Indiana County | Buffington Township | | | | Located along the Ghost Town Trail. |
| Landrus | | Tioga County | | | | | An early pioneer of using electricity in logging camps, Landrus disappeared after the railroad was redirected through a different town. |
| Laquin | | Bradford County | Franklin Township | 1902 | | | Once a booming lumber town. |
| Laurel Run | | Luzerne County | N/A | | | Semi-abandoned | Has experienced a sharp decline in residents due to the contamination caused by the Laurel Run mine fire, which started in 1915 and is still burning. |
| Lausanne | Lausanne Landing | Carbon County | | | | | |
| Lily Pond | | | | | | | An extremely small logging town on the Clarion River. |
| Livermore | | Westmoreland County | Derry Township | | | Submerged | A Pennsylvania Canal ghost town under the waters of Conemaugh River Lake |
| Loop | | Indiana County | West Mahoning Township | | | | An iron furnace & coal mining ghost town |
| Marburg | | | | | | Submerged | Submerged under Lake Marburg. |
| Marietta | | Westmoreland County | Ligonier Township | | | | A coal mining ghost town |
| Masten | | Lycoming County | | | | | |
| McIntyre | | Lycoming County | McIntyre Township | | | | |
| McKinley | | Elk County | Highland Township | | | | A logging/oil drilling ghost town. |
| Meco | | Indiana County | Brush Valley Township | | | | A coal mining ghost town |
| Mehrtena | Mertina, Mertena | Clarion County | Beaver Township | 1872 | 1878 | Barren | A small oil town. |
| Middletown | | | | | | | Located on the Clarion River between Corduroy and Rushland. |
| Milford Mills | | | | | | Submerged | Flooded by creation of Marsh Creek Lake |
| Millwood Shaft | | Westmoreland County | Derry Township | | | | |
| Mongtown | Knox | Clarion County | Beaver Township | 1872 | 1881 | Barren | An oil boom town. Home to the famous St. Lawrence well. |
| Nebraska | | Forest County | | | | | |
| Nelsonville | | Elk County | | | | | |
| Nemacolin | | Greene County | Cumberland Township | | | | Formerly the site of the Buckeye Coal Mine. |
| New England | | Westmoreland County | | 1900 | 1932 | | A coal mining ghost town. |
| Newport | | Indiana County | Blacklick Township | Before colonization (possibly 8,000 years bce) | 1820s | Barren/historic | A former Native American settlement. In 2019, Indiana University of Pennsylvania students of archaeology began excavation at the site. |
| Newtown Mills | | Forest County | Kingsley Township | | | | |
| Norwich | | McKean County | | | | | A town that once housed 5,000 residents. |
| Old Patton (Wakena) | | Westmoreland County | Bell Township | | | | A coal mining ghost town |
| Owl's Nest | | Elk County | Highland Township | | | | A logging/oil drilling ghost town |
| Pandamonia | Pandemonium | Perry County | | | | Located in the Tuscarora State Forest. | |
| Peale | | Clearfield County | Cooper Township | | | | Coal mining ghost town |
| Pemberton | | Huntingdon County | Franklin Township | | | | |
| Petroleum Center | | Venango County | Cornplanter Township | | | | |
| Pickwick | Paris City | Clarion County | Salem Township | 1872-1873 | 1880-1881 | Barren | An oil boom town, named for the Pickwick Club of St. Petersburg. |
| Pig’s Ear | | Elk County | Highland Township | | | Semi-abandoned | An oil drilling ghost town |
| Pithole | | Venango County | Cornplanter Township | | | | An oil drilling ghost town |
| Poe Mills | | Centre County | | | | | A former logging town, now the site of Poe Paddy State Park. |
| Port Perry | | Allegheny County | North Versailles Township | | 1945 | | |
| Powelton | | Centre County | | | | | A coal mining ghost town |
| Powelton | | Huntingdon County | | | | | A coal mining ghost town |
| Quaker Bridge | | | | | | | |
| Rattling Run | | | | | | | |
| Rausch Gap | | Lebanon County | Cold Spring Township | | | | |
| Red Hot | | Allegheny County | West Deer Township | | | | Along Saxonburg Boulevard |
| Red Shaft | | | | | | | A coal mining ghost town |
| Ricketts | | Sullivan/Wyoming counties | Colley (Sullivan) Forkston (Wyoming) | | | | |
| Robindale | | Indiana County | | | | | A coal mining ghost town |
| Rushland | Sackett, Rush Valley | Bucks County | Wrightstown Township | 1730 | | | Most famous for the old Rushland station. |
| Safe Harbor | | Lancaster County | Conestoga Township | | | | See also Safe Harbor Dam. |
| Salemville | | Westmoreland County | Salem Township | | | | A coal mining ghost town |
| Sam City | | Clarion County | Beaver Township | 1877 | 1879 | Barren | "...an apology of a town on the John Beck farm.." The name of this oil town comes from the fact that there were eight Sams living there at one point. |
| Scotia | | Centre County | Patton Township | | 1922-1923 | | A mining town |
| Scott Glenn | | Indiana County | East Wheatfield Township | | | | A coal mining ghost town along the Ghost Town Trail |
| Shanktown | | Indiana County | Green Township | | | | A coal mining ghost town |
| Shawmut | | Elk County | Horton Township | | | | |
| Sidney | | Indiana County | Banks Township | | | | Located at Bear Run. |
| Silverton | Branch Township | Schuylkill County | | | | | |
| Slambang | Slam Bang City | Clarion County | Beaver Township | 1877 | 1879 | Barren | A short lived oil boom town. |
| Sligo | | Allegheny County | Harrison Township | | | | |
| Smokeless (Robindale) | | Indiana County | East Wheatfield Township | | | | A coal mining ghost town |
| Snyder | | Indiana County | Center Township | | | | A mining town. |
| Snydertown | | Westmoreland County | Derry Township | | | | |
| Social Hall | | | | | | Submerged | Under the waters of Conemaugh River Lake. |
| Somerfield | | Somerset County | | | 1943 | Submerged | Under the waters of Youghiogheny River Lake, but in 1999 receding water levels began to reveal parts of the town. |
| Sonesville | | | | | | | An obscure logging town |
| Straight | | Elk County | | | | Submerged | Under the waters of East Branch Lake. |
| Stringtown | | Greene County | | | | | |
| Tambine | | Elk County | Jones Township | | | | |
| Tartown | Wagamansville | Adams County | | | | | |
| Three Mile | | Elk County | Highland Township | | | | An oil drilling ghost town |
| Tohickon Village | | Bucks County | | | | Submerged | Under the waters of Lake Nockamixon |
| Triangle | | Clarion County | Salem Township | 1873 | 1879-1881 | Barren | A small oil boom town. The town was settled in a way that made the shape of a triangle, which gave the town its name. |
| Walston | | Jefferson County | Young Township | | | | A coal company patch town. |
| Webster | | Indiana County | | | | | A coal mining ghost town along the Ghost Town Trail. |
| Wehrum | | Indiana County | Buffington Township | | 1934 | | A coal mining ghost town |
| Wenona | | Allegheny County | Forward Township | | | | A coal mining ghost town |
| West Overton | | | | | | Historic | |
| West Winfield | | Butler County | Winfield Township | | | | A former company town which once housed a rail station. |
| Whiskey Run | | Indiana County | Young Township | | | | A coal mining ghost town famous for multiple unsolved murders. |
| White Rock | | Armstrong County | Gilpin Township | | | | A coal mining ghost town |
| Wilmer | | | | | | | |
| Wilsonville | | | | | | Submerged | Flooded to create Lake Wallenpaupack |
| Windy City | | Elk County | Highland Township | | | | |
| Wistar | | Elk County | | | | | |
| Yellow Dog Village | | Armstrong County | | | Early 2010s | Historic/neglected | |
| Yellow Springs | | Lebanon County | | | | | |
| Zanmore | | Clinton County | | | | | |

== See also ==
- Kinzua Dam
- Rust Belt
- Night in the Woods, a video game which takes place in the fictional semi-abandoned town of Possum Springs inspired by the creator's hometown in Pennsylvania
- Coal mining in the United States
- Pennsylvania
  - List of cities in Pennsylvania
  - List of towns and boroughs in Pennsylvania
  - List of counties in Pennsylvania
