= Ceylon (disambiguation) =

Ceylon was the English name applied to the South Asian island nation of Sri Lanka until it repudiated its status as a Dominion and became a republic in 1972.

Ceylon may also refer to:

== Places ==
=== Sri Lanka ===
- Portuguese Ceylon (Ceilão), a Portuguese colony between 1505 and 1658
- Dutch Ceylon (Zeylan), a Dutch East India Company territory between 1640 and 1796
- British Ceylon, a British territory from 1815 to 1948
- Dominion of Ceylon, a dominion in the British Commonwealth between 1948 and 1972
- Jung Ceylon, the same English name was given to Jang Si Lang (modern day Phuket)

=== Canada ===
- Ceylon, Saskatchewan, a village
- Ceylon, Ontario, a village

=== United States ===
- Ceylon, Georgia, a ghost town
- Ceylon, Indiana, an unincorporated community
- Ceylon, Minnesota, a city
- Ceylon, Pennsylvania, an unincorporated community

=== Philippines ===
- Ceylon, old name of the island of Leyte in early Spanish maps

== Ships ==
- HMS Ceylon (1808), a 32-gun frigate in the Royal Navy
- HMS Ceylon (30), a Fiji-class cruiser commissioned in 1943
  - Ceylon-class cruiser, a sub-class of the Fiji-class cruisers

== Other uses ==
- Ceylon tea, a brand of tea produced and packed in Sri Lanka
- Ceylon (curry), a family of curry recipes
- Ceylon (film), an Indian film
- Ceylon (programming language), a programming language announced by Red Hat in 2011
- 45604 Ceylon, a British LMS Jubilee Class locomotive

== People with the given name ==
- Ceylon Manohar (c. 1944–2018), Tamil pop singer and actor
- Ceylon Wright (1893–1947), American baseball player

== See also ==
- Air Ceylon, the Sri Lankan national airline until 1978, then replaced by Air Lanka
- Ceylon ironwood or Mesua ferrea, a plant native to Sri Lanka
- Names of Sri Lanka
- Radio Ceylon, the oldest radio station in south Asia, then replaced by Sri Lanka Broadcasting Corporation in 1967
