= Towanda =

Towanda is the name of several places in the United States:

- Towanda, Illinois
- Towanda, Kansas
- Pennsylvania:
  - Communities:
    - Towanda, Pennsylvania, a borough in Bradford County
    - Towanda Township, Pennsylvania, a township in Bradford County
    - North Towanda Township, Pennsylvania, a township in Bradford County
  - Streams:
    - Towanda Creek, a tributary of the Susquehanna River
    - South Branch Towanda Creek, a tributary of Towanda Creek
