= Ceylon (curry) =

- Type: Curry
- Place of origin: Sri Lanka
- Main ingredients: Coconut, lime, Ceylon curry powder

Ceylon is the name given to a family of curry recipes with the key ingredients being coconut, lime, and a specific Ceylon curry powder, which classifies it as "hot" on most guides.

== Ceylonese curries ==
- Chicken curry
- Elumas - lamb curry
- Kalu Uru Mas curry - black pork curry
- Mas Ismoru - beef curry
- Jaffna crab curry - crab curry
- Malu Mirisata - fish curry
- Wambatu Moju - eggplant/brinjal curry
