= Laquin, Pennsylvania =

Coordinates: 41°37′56″N 76°39′03″W

Laquin is a ghost town in Franklin Township, Bradford County, Pennsylvania. It was founded in 1902 as a lumber town, but when the forests played out and the mills could no longer be fed, the industry left, and the people soon followed. The population of Laquin at one time approached 2,000. (The nearby ghost town of Barclay was a coal mining town.)

== History ==
Laquin was home to five companies, all of which processed wood in one way or another. The Laquin Lumber Company (later the Central Pennsylvania Lumber Company) started out under the leadership of Watson L. Barclay. Laquin Lumber Company was under contract with the Central Pennsylvania Lumber Company to produce lumber from the land of the Union Tanning Company, a subsidiary of the United States Leather Company, one of the largest companies in the United States at that time. The bark would go to their tanneries. Four additional companies in operation in Laquin were Schrader Wood Company, Pennsylvania Hub & Veneer Company, Pennsylvania Stave Company, and Barclay Chemical Company.

In 1933, after the Barclay Mountain was clear cut and the lumber companies pulled out, a Civilian Conservation Corps (CCC) camp was established. The CCC was one of President Roosevelt's New Deal programs. The CCC in Laquin was responsible for replanting trees on the mountain, building access roads, feeding game, and restoring the ecology. By 1941, after the CCC pulled out, Laquin was a ghost town.

There are a few traces of the town today, though the last building disappeared sometime in the 1960s. The main street, which once sported a hotel, two churches, a school, a boarding house, store, depot, town building and several homes still exists in the form of the major access road.

The ghost towns of Laquin and Barclay are in close proximity to one another, but Laquin came into existence after Barclay, Pennsylvania. Both towns were served by the also long defunct Susquehanna and New York Railroad, which operated between Towanda, Pennsylvania and Williamsport, Pennsylvania. Most of the trackbed and bridges of the Susquehanna and New York are still in evidence throughout the valley of the Schrader Creek.

The LeRoy Heritage Museum, in LeRoy, Pennsylvania, preserves the history of Laquin. More information can be found at the museum website at www.leroyheritage.org.

== See also ==
- List of ghost towns in Pennsylvania
