= Cumberland Township, Greene County, Pennsylvania =

Township in Pennsylvania, US

Coordinates: 39°53′23″N 80°00′59″W

- Township
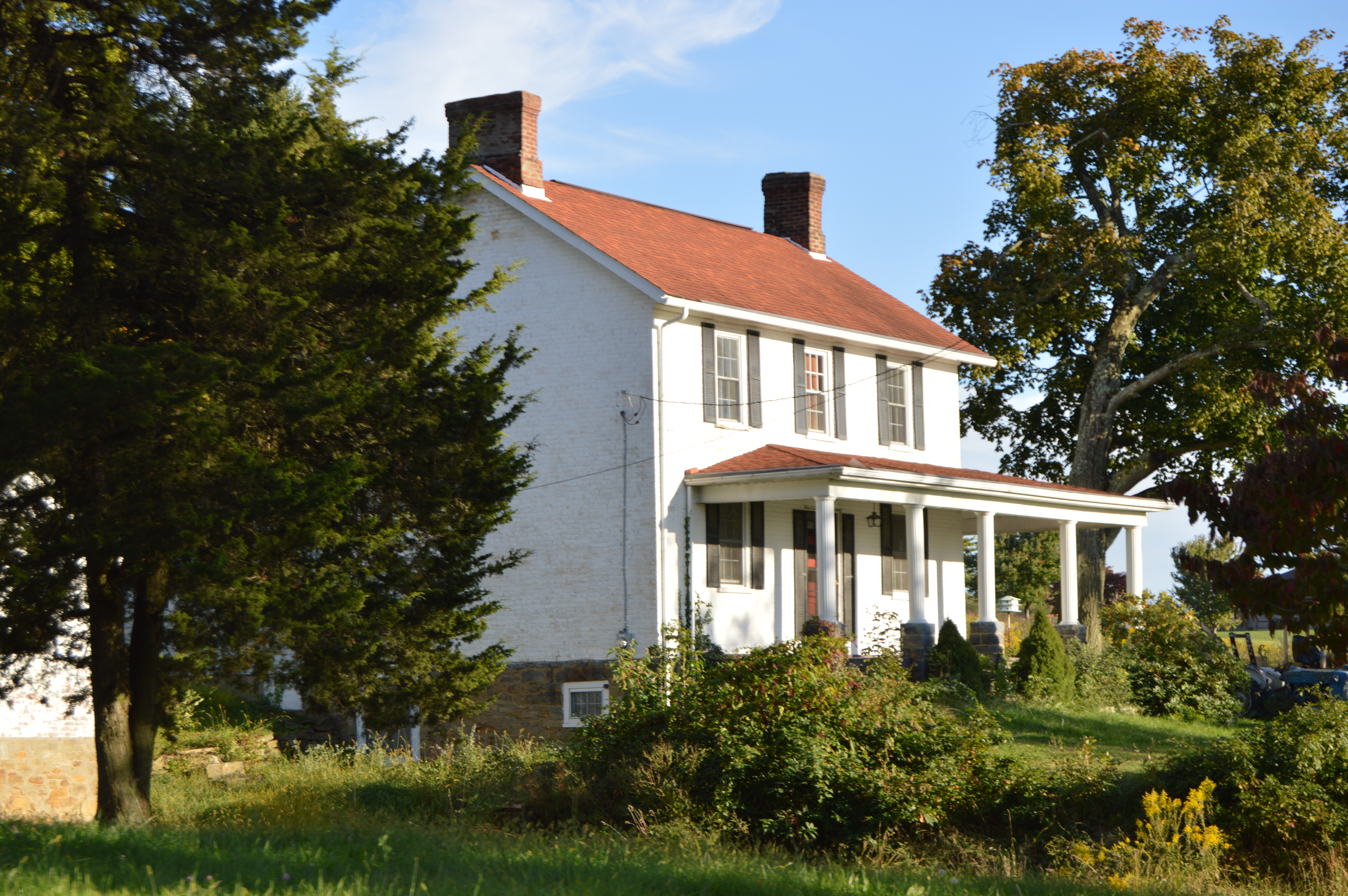
- Farmhouse on Stevenson Lane

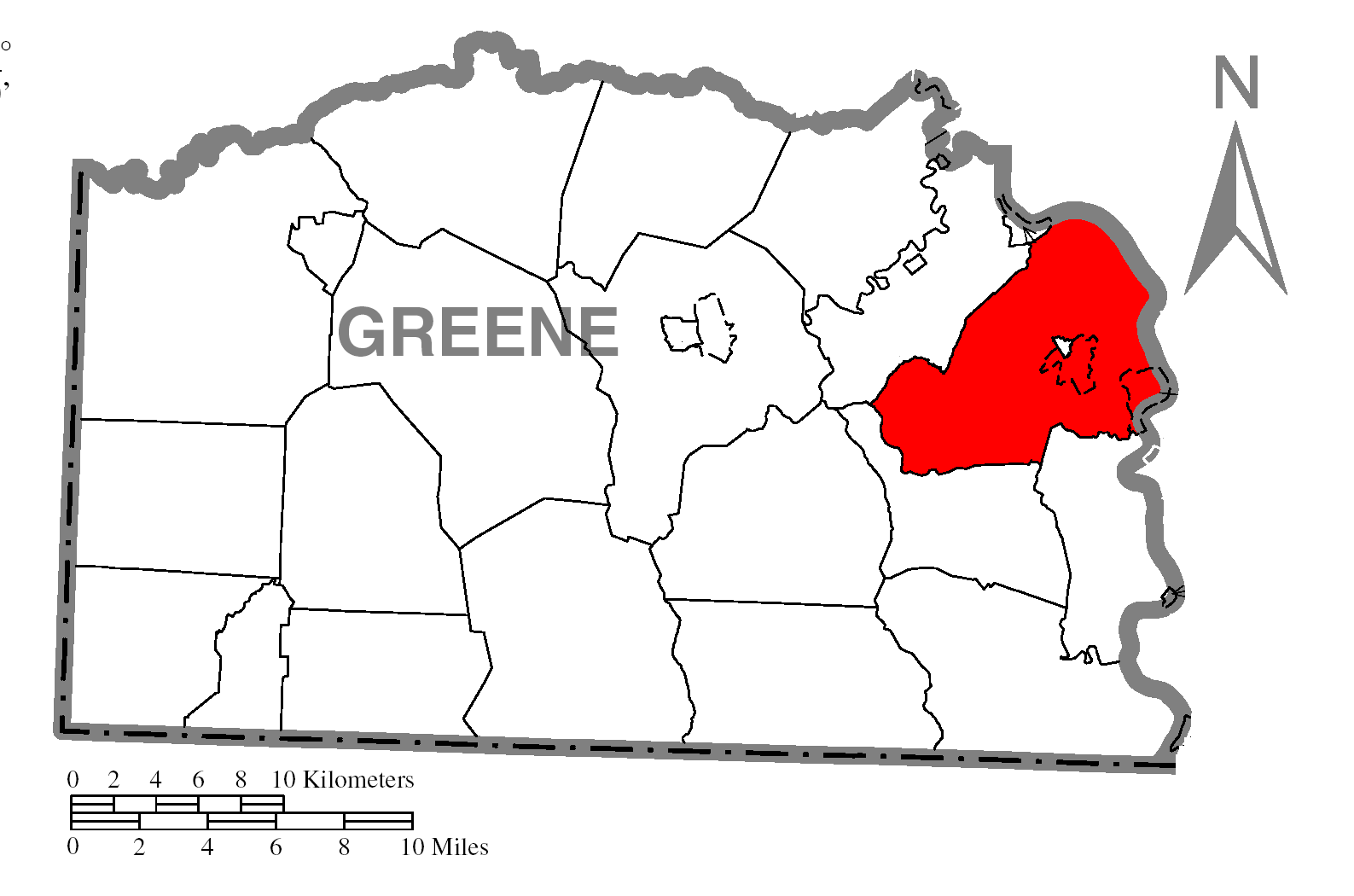
- Location of Cumberland Township in Greene County

- Location of Greene County in Pennsylvania
- Country: United States
- State: Pennsylvania
- County: Greene

Government
  - Township Supervisor: Sam Hastings (Democrat)
  - Tax Collector: Pamela Whyel Democrat/Republican

Area
  - Total: 38.90 sq mi (100.76 km^{2})
  - Land: 38.26 sq mi (99.08 km^{2})
  - Water: 0.64 sq mi (1.67 km^{2})
- Elevation: 1,000 ft (300 m)

Population (2020)
  - Total: 6,384 ▼
  - Estimate (2023): 6,146
  - Density: 167/sq mi (64.3/km^{2})
- Time zone: UTC-4 (EST)
  - Summer (DST): UTC-5 (EDT)
- Area code: 724
- FIPS code: 42-059-17648
- Website: https://cumberlandtownship.net/

Cumberland Township is a township in Greene County, Pennsylvania, United States. The population was 6,384 at the 2020 census.

== History ==
The William Crawford House was listed on the National Register of Historic Places in 1992.

== Geography ==
Cumberland Township is in eastern Greene County, with its eastern border following the center of the Monongahela River and forming the Fayette County line. The township surrounds the borough of Carmichaels, a separate municipality. The township includes the census-designated places of Crucible, Fairdale and Nemacolin. Other unincorporated communities in the township include Stringtown, Cumberland Village, Neil Corner, Baileys Crossroads, Khedive, Ceylon, Little Chicago, Paisley, and Live Easy.

According to the United States Census Bureau, the township has a total area of 38.9 square miles (100.8 km^{2}), of which 38.3 square miles (99.1 km^{2}) is land and 0.66 square miles (1.7 km^{2}), or 1.66%, is water.

== Demographics ==
Historical population
Census	Pop.	Note	%±
2000	6,564		—
2010	6,623		0.9%
2020	6,384		−3.6%
2025 (est.)	6,066		−5.0%
U.S. Decennial Census

As of the census of 2000, there were 6,564 people, 2,659 households, and 1,834 families residing in the township. The population density was 171.7 inhabitants per square mile (66.3/km^{2}). There were 2,893 housing units at an average density of 75.7 per square mile (29.2/km^{2}). The racial makeup of the township was 98.58% White, 0.27% African American, 0.23% Native American, 0.02% Asian, 0.02% from other races, and 0.88% from two or more races. Hispanic or Latino of any race were 0.50% of the population.

There were 2,659 households, out of which 30.6% had children under the age of 18 living with them, 52.7% were married couples living together, 11.7% had a female householder with no husband present, and 31.0% were non-families. 27.1% of all households were made up of individuals, and 14.6% had someone living alone who was 65 years of age or older. The average household size was 2.43 and the average family size was 2.94.

In the township the population was spread out, with 24.1% under the age of 18, 7.4% from 18 to 24, 26.6% from 25 to 44, 24.7% from 45 to 64, and 17.2% who were 65 years of age or older. The median age was 40 years. For every 100 females there were 92.9 males. For every 100 females age 18 and over, there were 87.8 males.

The median income for a household in the township was $26,834, and the median income for a family was $36,188. Males had a median income of $36,439 versus $22,344 for females. The per capita income for the township was $15,293. About 16.1% of families and 19.4% of the population were below the poverty line, including 26.4% of those under age 18 and 14.1% of those age 65 or over.
