= Barclay, Pennsylvania =

Ghost town in Pennsylvania, US

Coordinates: 41°39′21″N 76°37′35″W

The ghost town of Barclay, in Franklin Township, Bradford County, Pennsylvania, was a coal mining town. Coal was transported down the mountain by a gravity powered incline plane rail system. There was a brake house at the top of Barclay Mountain. The loaded cars were attached to a cable that pulled the empty cars back up. At the bottom, the cars were hauled 16 miles into Towanda by steam locomotives, to be emptied there into the Pennsylvania Canal's North Branch coal barges. The Barclay cemetery still exists and provides an interesting place to visit.

The towns of Barclay and Laquin are in close proximity of each other. Barclay came and went before Laquin, Pennsylvania. The first mined coal and the second processed timber from the surrounding forests. The Barclay Railroad was abandoned in 1899, damaged by a flood in 1900, and rebuilt as the Susquehanna and New York Railroad. This operated between Monroe, Pennsylvania (Monroeton) and Williamsport, Pennsylvania, and was abandoned during WW II with the rails removed and repurposed for the war effort. Most of the trackbed, and bridges are still very much in evidence throughout the valleys of Schrader Creek and Pleasant Stream.

== See also ==
- List of ghost towns in Pennsylvania

== Bibliography ==
- Abell, Guy; Martha Abell (2007). Barclay Mountain. A History. Towanda, Pennsylvania: Bradford County Historical Society. p. 359.
