= Robindale, Pennsylvania =

Former community in Pennsylvania, US

- Former community
- Robindale
- Location within Pennsylvania Robindale (the United States)
- Coordinates: 40.4005118°N 79.0369873°W
- Country: United States
- State: Pennsylvania
- County: Indiana
- Township: East Wheatfield
- Destroyed: 1977

Robindale (formerly known as Smokeless) was an unincorporated rural community in East Wheatfield Township, Indiana County, Pennsylvania, United States. The community was destroyed by the Johnstown flood of 1977. To commemorate the town, a portion of PA Route 2008 (from PA Route 2009 to PA Route 56, the portion also known as Power Plant Road) was officially designated as the Robindale Memorial Highway by the PA General Assembly in 2024.

== History ==
Robindale (Smokeless) was located in Indiana County, Pennsylvania, along the Conemaugh River. Its neighboring communities include Seward and New Florence. It was originally developed in 1915 as a company town by the Conemaugh Smokeless Coal Co.

Prior to the 1977 flood that permanently destroyed the town, it fell victim to other disasters, including two coal mining accidents that killed 11 residents, and the St. Patrick’s Day Flood of 1936, a flood which is famous for its flooding across the entire Mid-Atlantic, unlike the Johnstown area’s two other famous floods, which are known for their effect on areas surrounding the Conemaugh River.

== Flood ==
The town was destroyed by slow-rising floodwaters on July 20, 1977. Heavy rainfall began on the night of July 19, 1977. All residents of the town were able to make it to safety.

== Current use ==
The former site of Robindale is currently home to Robindale Energy’s Seward Generation Plant, which is the largest waste coal-fired power plant in the United States. The plant was built as an upgrade to the former Robindale-adjacent plant, built in 1919, which was inundated in the 1977 flood and sat unused.

== Geography ==
The former location of Robindale is in Indiana County at approximately 40.4005118°N 79.0369873°W.

== See also ==
- List of ghost towns in Pennsylvania
- Johnstown flood of 1977
