= Loop, Pennsylvania =

Loop, Pennsylvania may refer to:

- Loop, Blair County, Pennsylvania
- Loop, Indiana County, Pennsylvania
