= Big Creek Valley, Pennsylvania =

Coordinates: 40.869°N 75.607°W

Big Creek Valley was a village in Carbon County, Pennsylvania, United States. It was part of Northeastern Pennsylvania.

In 1966, the village was vacated to make way for Beltzville Lake, located in what is now Beltzville State Park. American composer David W. Guion may have lived in Big Creek Valley.

== See also ==
- List of ghost towns in Pennsylvania
