= Ingleby, Pennsylvania =

Ghost town in Pennsylvania, US

- Ghost town
- Location within the U.S. state of Pennsylvania Ingleby (the United States)
- Coordinates: 40°50′40″N 77°26′6″W
- Country: United States
- State: Pennsylvania
- County: Centre
- Township: Haines
- Time zone: UTC-5 (Eastern (EST))
  - Summer (DST): UTC-4 (EDT)
- Postal code: 16820
- Area code: 814
- GNIS feature ID: 1177810

Ingleby is a ghost town located in Haines Township, Centre County, Pennsylvania, United States. It is nearest to the town of Coburn and borders the Bald Eagle State Forest. Other nearby towns include Aaronsburg, Millheim, and Woodward. It was at one time also named Fowler.

Dr. Frank Barker erected a large house near the tracks of the Lewisburg and Tyrone Railroad, two miles east of hunting and fishing cottages, and the spot quickly became a popular resort known as Ingleby. The section of railroad passing through Ingleby was abandoned in 1970. Today access is provided by Ingleby Road (State Route 2018, unpaved). Most of the land that made up the town of Ingleby is privately owned and not accessible to the public.

Jacqueline Melander, former president of the Centre County Historical Society, described Ingleby in a preliminary nomination to the National Register of Historic Places for the surrounding region to become a historic district ("Penns/Brush Valley Rural Historic District"). The nomination was not successful. The nomination was quoted in a 2006 regional planning outline:

Above Coburn and surrounded by mountains, Penns Creek runs through the tiny settlement of Ingleby, once a flag station on the Lewisburg and Tyrone Railroad. Lumber and lumber products were carried out of the mountains, and railroad passenger service provided access to this scenic high valley. In the 1880s Dr. Frank Barker, a veterinarian, purchased 500 acres to lumber, establish fruit farms, and breed horses. He built a large home and opened a resort in the mountains, Barker's Resort for Health and Pleasure, and later sold land for cottages and hunting camps. Fowler was the railroad station name for this community

Ingleby was not mentioned in the description for Haines Township in a post office directory published in Bellefonte, Pa for Centre County with data from the 1890 census. Additionally none of the Haines Township citizens are listed as residing in Ingleby or Fowler.
