= Ellmont, Pennsylvania =

Ghost town

Coordinates: 41.248°N 78.797°W

Ellmont is a ghost town site near Brockway, in the Elk County−Jefferson County areas of western Pennsylvania.

It is located along a present-day bicycle and hiking rail trail, built on the old railroad right of way along Little Toby Creek in Jefferson and Elk Counties.

== History ==
A steel mill was built nearby in 1883, leading to the establishment of the town of Blue Rock, later renamed Ellmont. In 1892, a large timber forest known was the "Ellis Timber", covering over 2000 acres in Ellmont, was sold, cut and milled. After the mill burned down, the town was abandoned.

== See also ==
- List of ghost towns in Pennsylvania
