= Live Easy, Pennsylvania =

Unincorporated community in Pennsylvania, US

- Unincorporated community
- Location within Pennsylvania Location within the United States
- Coordinates: 39°51′47″N 79°56′13″W
- Country: United States
- State: Pennsylvania
- County: Greene
- Township: Cumberland
- Elevation: 915 ft (279 m)
- Time zone: UTC-5 (Eastern (EST))
  - Summer (DST): UTC-4 (EDT)
- GNIS feature ID: 1179725

Live Easy is an unincorporated community in Greene County, Pennsylvania, United States.

The origin of the name Live Easy is obscure.
