= William Crawford House =

Historic house in Pennsylvania, United States

- U.S. National Register of Historic Places
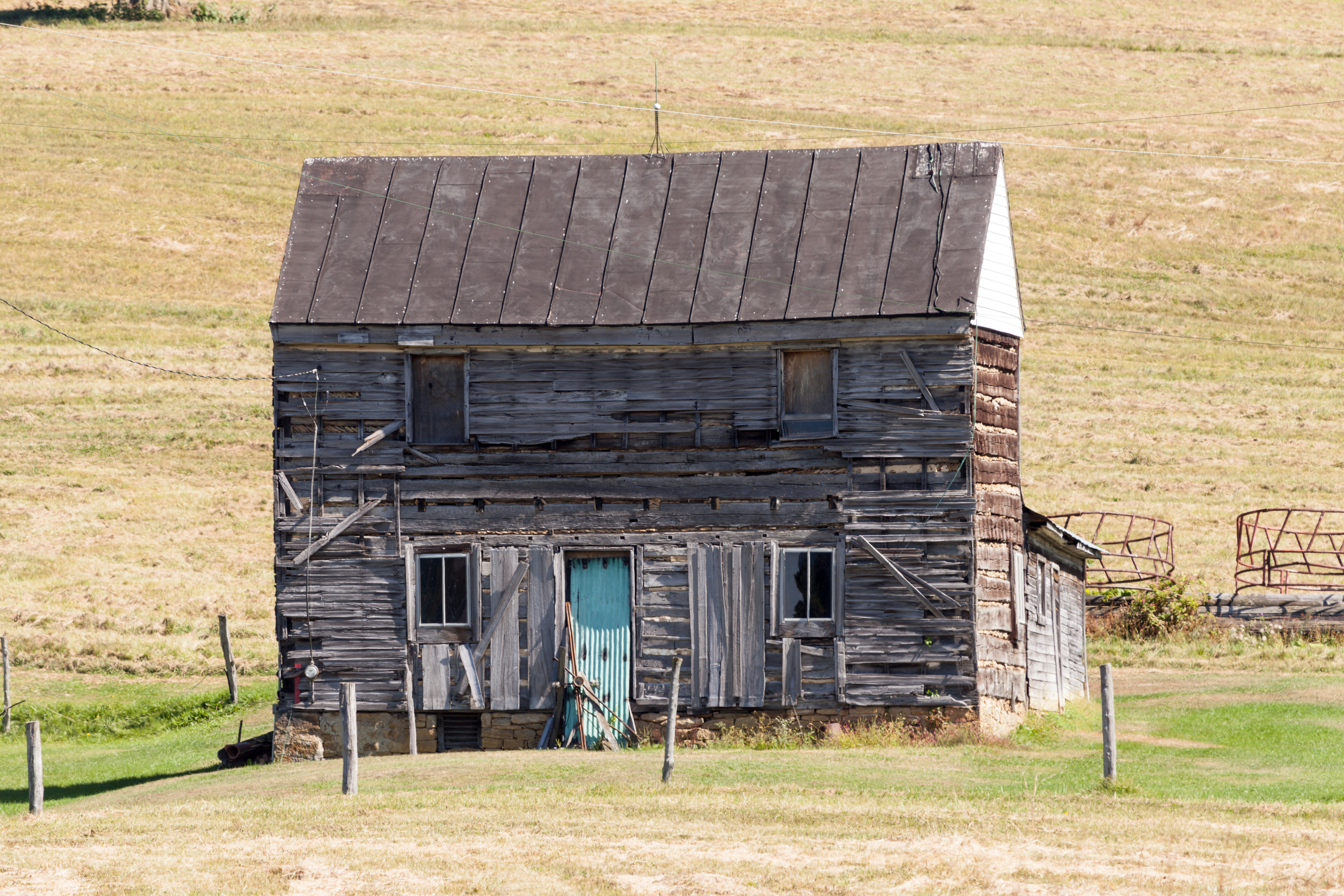
- The house in September 2014

- Location within Pennsylvania Location within the United States
- Location: Off the junction of Brown's Ferry Road and Stevenson's Lane, east of Carmichaels, Cumberland Township, Pennsylvania
- Coordinates: 39°53′39″N 79°56′57″W
- Area: 0.5 acres (0.20 ha)
- Built: c. 1815
- Architectural style: Vernacular log dwelling
- MPS: Whiskey Rebellion Resources in Southwestern Pennsylvania MPS
- NRHP reference No.: 92001496
- Added to NRHP: November 12, 1992

William Crawford House is a historic home located at Cumberland Township in Greene County, Pennsylvania. It was built about 1815, and is a 2 1/2-story, three-bay log building. It has a gable roof and sits on a rubblestone foundation. It has a 1 1/2-story, rear kitchen ell. The logs, visible in some areas through deteriorated weatherboarding, are dovetailed.

It was listed on the National Register of Historic Places in 1992.
