= Concrete City =

Ghost town in Pennsylvania, United States

- Company town
- The ruins of an abandoned home in Concrete City, December 2023

- Location within Pennsylvania Location within the United States
- Coordinates: 41°11′21″N 75°58′34″W
- Country: United States
- State: Pennsylvania
- County: Luzerne
- Founded: 1911
- Abandoned: 1924

Population (2026)
  - Total: 0
  - Estimate (1911): Around 80
- Time zone: UTC-5 (Eastern (EST))
  - Summer (DST): UTC-4 (EDT)

Concrete City is a ghost town in Luzerne County, Pennsylvania, United States. It was an early example of International Style architecture in the United States, built as company housing in 1911 for select employees of the Delaware, Lackawanna and Western Railroad's coal division in Nanticoke.

The complex originally consisted of 22 duplex houses which surrounded a central courtyard containing tennis courts and a baseball field.

It was eventually taken over by the Glen Alden Coal Company which, uninterested in paying for required improvements and unable to demolish it due to its robust construction, abandoned the property in 1924.

In 1998, the Pennsylvania Historical and Museum Commission declared Concrete City a historic site.

Concrete City stands to this day, albeit in extreme disrepair. Demolition plans by the state were scrapped due to the cost of a potential operation. The ghost town is commonly used by military, police, firefighters, airsoft military-simulation events, recreational paintball players for staged games, and as a popular site for urban explorers.

== See also ==
- List of ghost towns in Pennsylvania
