= Little Toby Creek =

Tributary

Coordinates: 41.27932°N 78.69644°W

Little Toby Creek is a tributary of the Clarion River in northwest Pennsylvania in the United States.

Little Toby Creek joins the Clarion River near the community of Portland Mills in Elk County.

== See also ==
- Ellmont, Pennsylvania — ghost town on the creek.
- List of tributaries of the Allegheny River
- List of rivers of Pennsylvania
