= Arroyo, Pennsylvania =

Former town

Coordinates: 41°23′27″N 78°52′49″W

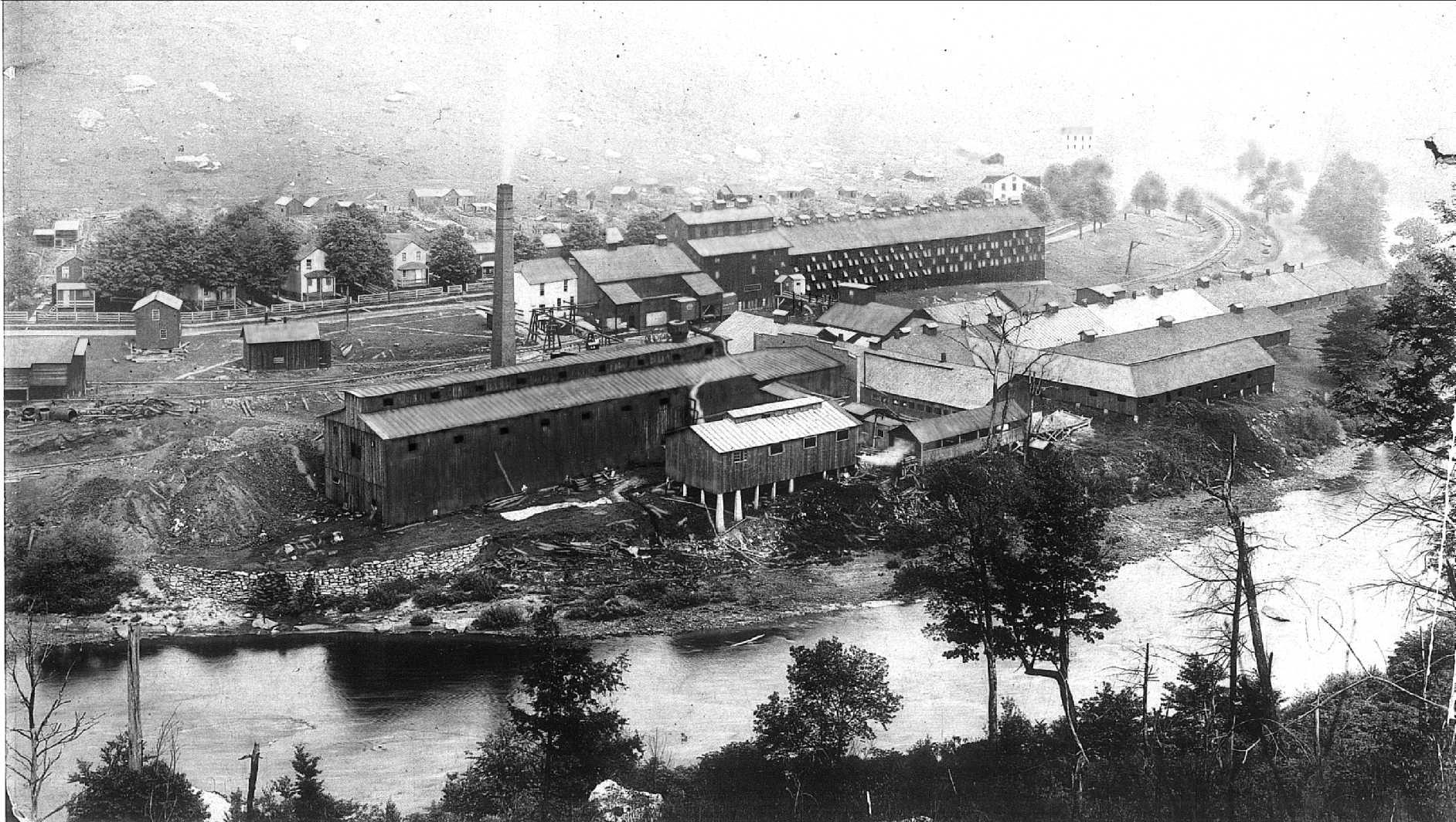
Tannery in the early 1900s

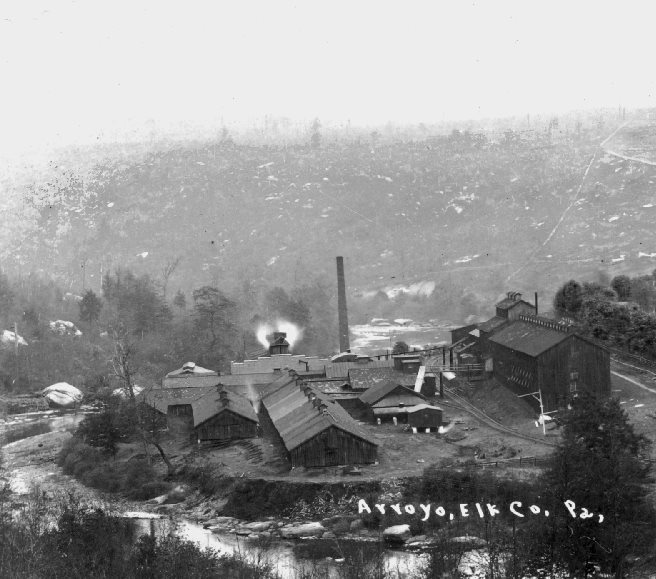
Town overview, circa 1910

Arroyo was a lumber town in western Pennsylvania in the United States that also had an extensive hide tanning industry.

It was founded by Thomas Irwin and located in the township of Spring Creek, on the Clarion River, and 10 miles (16 km) from Ridgway.

The Arroyo Bridge Company was incorporated in April, 1883, with F. Shaffner, E. M. Rogers, C. H. Smith, James B. Wicks and Charles Millen, directors. The object was to bridge the Clarion at Arroyo.

== Arroyo Bridge ==
The original Arroyo Bridge, located in Elk County, was originally constructed in 1882 by the Arroyo Bridge Company, which consisted of a group of local residents who operated it as a toll bridge until 1899.Squire Webster, the toll master, lived at one end of the bridge and collected the tolls from travelers. A family with a horse and wagon could cross for 10 cents. Elk County purchased the bridge and replaced it in 1901, when it became the site for many summer social events and dances.

The second Arroyo Bridge (1901-2004), a three-span, metal Pratt Truss bridge, 287 feet (87 m) long, built by the Nelson and Buchanan company of Pittsburgh and Chambersburg, Pennsylvania, crossed the Clarion River here. This bridge was built to replace the Arroyo Bridge Company's toll bridge, but now free of any tolls. The bridge was such an important structure in the town that dances and parties were held on its deck during Arroyo's heyday. A consulting company was hired to design another replacement Arroyo Bridge in the 1990s; in 1992 the designing of a replacement bridge began. The design was approved in 2003 and its construction was completed in 2004, costing $2.3 million .

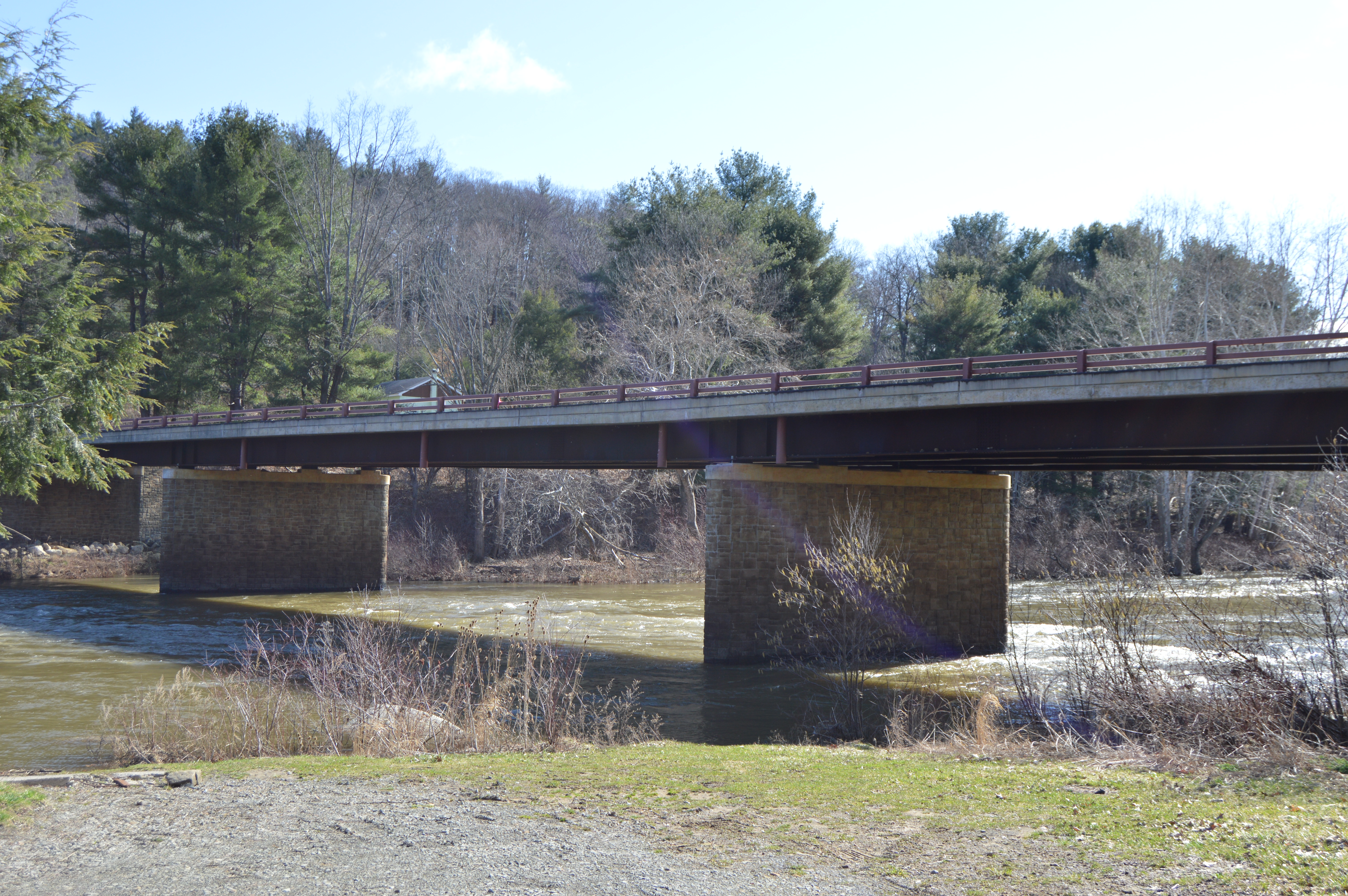
Replacement Arroyo Bridge, built in the 2000s

== See also ==
- List of ghost towns in Pennsylvania
