= Aitch, Pennsylvania =

Ghost town in Pennsylvania, US

Coordinates: 40°22′27″N 78°09′33″W

Aitch is an extinct town in Huntingdon County, Pennsylvania. The GNIS classifies it as a populated place. The town site was inundated by the creation of Raystown Lake. Aitch Boat Launch retains the name.

A post office called Aitch was established in 1887, and remained in operation until 1973. The village's Zip Code was 16610. The community's name is an acronym of names of first settlers, namely Aumen, Isett, Tom Enyeart, Crum, and Haffley.

== See also ==
- List of ghost towns in Pennsylvania
