= South Branch Towanda Creek =

Watercourse in Pennsylvania, US

Coordinates: 41.60437°N 76.85861°W

South Branch Towanda Creek is a tributary of Towanda Creek in Bradford County, Pennsylvania, in the United States. It is approximately 16.5 miles (26.6 km) long and flows through Terry Township, Albany Township, New Albany, and Monroe Township.

== Course ==
South Branch Towanda Creek begins on a hill in Terry Township. It flows southwest for a short distance and then turns southwest and flows through several small lakes. The creek enters Albany Township and after some distance begins to gradually turn north-northwest, flowing parallel to U.S. Route 220. After several miles, it passes through New Albany, where it receives the tributaries Beaver Run and Ladds Creek. Continuing roughly north, the creek passes by Hatch Mountain and enters Monroe Township. In Monroe Township, it receives the tributaries Fenner Run, Saterlee Run, and Kent Run. It passes Nichols Point, Marcy Point, and Kellogg Mountain. A few miles downstream, the creek reaches its confluence with Towanda Creek near the community of Monroeton.

South Branch Towanda Creek joins Towanda Creek 4.18 miles (6.73 km) upstream of its mouth.

== Geography ==
The elevation near the mouth of South Branch Towanda Creek is 754 feet (230 m) above sea level. The elevation of the stream's source is between 1,500 feet (460 m) and 1,520 feet (460 m) above sea level. South Branch Towanda Creek drops fairly steeply along its length, but is fairly shallow and has numerous rock outcroppings on it. The creek flows through a canyon-like valley and has a riparian buffer in many places. There are some strainers along it.

== Watershed ==
The watershed of South Branch Towanda Creek has an area of 46.80 square miles (121.2 km^{2}). The creek lacks a gauge.

== Recreation ==
It is possible to canoe on 8.6 miles (13.8 km) of South Branch Towanda Creek during snowmelt or within three days of heavy rain. The creek's difficulty rating ranges between 1 and 3 and it is considered to be suitable for intermediate canoers. Edward Gertler describes the scenery along the creek as "fair to good" in his book Keystone Canoeing.

== See also ==
- List of rivers of Pennsylvania
- Schrader Creek
