= Jaffna crab curry =

- Alternative names: Sri Lankan crab curry, Kakuluwo curry
- Type: Curry
- Course: main
- Place of origin: Sri Lanka
- Serving temperature: hot
- Main ingredients: Crab, Coconut milk, Curry leaves, Chili, Onion, Chili Powder, Turmeric, Garlic, Ginger

Jaffna crab curry (Sinhala: යාපනය කකුළු ව්‍යංජනය, Tamil: யாழ்ப்பாண நண்டு கறி), also known as Sri Lankan crab curry or Kakuluwo curry, is a traditional spicy crab curry. The dish originated in the northern regions of Sri Lanka but is popular around the country, mostly in the seaboard areas where fish and other seafood are staple foods. The dish is served with rice, pittu or bread.

== Preparation ==
The dish typically uses either blue swimmer or mud crabs, broken into smaller portions and simmered in a claypot with coconut milk, curry leaves, seasonings and the seed pods of the drumstick tree.

Jaffna crab curry is normally eaten with thenkai sambal and rice.

== See also ==
- Cuisine of Sri Lanka
