= Beaver Township, Clarion County, Pennsylvania =

Township in Pennsylvania, US

Coordinates: 41°11′50″N 79°31′56″W

- Township
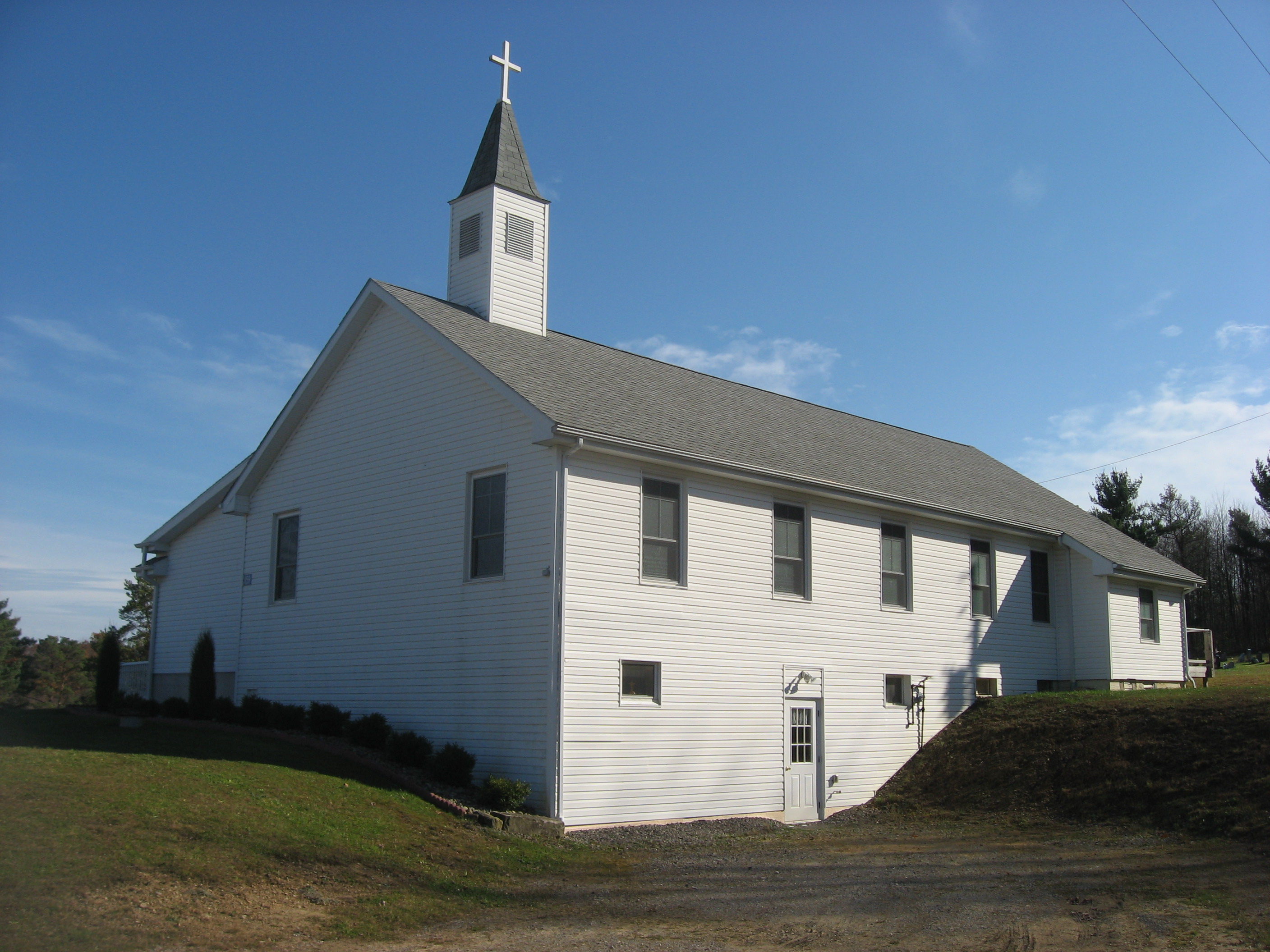
- Mount Joy United Methodist Church

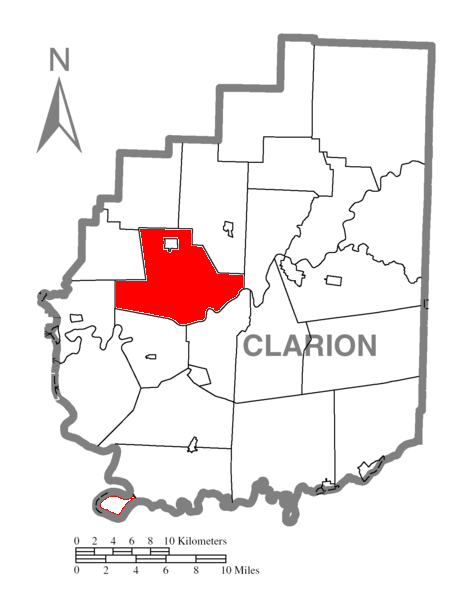
- Map of Clarion County, Pennsylvania highlighting Beaver Township

- Map of Clarion County, Pennsylvania
- Country: United States
- State: Pennsylvania
- County: Clarion
- Settled: 1801
- Incorporated: 1806

Area
  - Total: 33.74 sq mi (87.38 km^{2})
  - Land: 33.42 sq mi (86.56 km^{2})
  - Water: 0.32 sq mi (0.82 km^{2})

Population (2020)
  - Total: 1,828 ▲
  - Estimate (2023): 1,786
  - Density: 54.70/sq mi (21.12/km^{2})
- Time zone: UTC-5 (Eastern (EST))
  - Summer (DST): UTC-4 (EDT)
- FIPS code: 42-031-04696

Beaver Township is a township in Clarion County, Pennsylvania, United States. The population was 1,828 at the 2020 census, an increase over the figure of 1,761 tabulated in 2010.

== Geography ==
The township is in west-central Clarion County. The borough of Knox is in the northern part of the township but is a separate municipality. According to the United States Census Bureau, the township has a total area of 33.7 square miles (87.4 km^{2}), of which 33.4 square miles (86.6 km^{2}) is land and 0.3 square miles (0.8 km^{2}), or 0.94%, is water.

== Demographics ==
Historical population
Census	Pop.	Note	%±
2010	1,761		—
2020	1,828		3.8%
2023 (est.)	1,786		−2.3%
U.S. Decennial Census

As of the census of 2000, there were 1,753 people, 709 households, and 526 families residing in the township. The population density was 52.0 inhabitants per square mile (20.1/km^{2}). There were 793 housing units at an average density of 23.5/sq mi (9.1/km^{2}). The racial makeup of the township was 99.66% White, 0.11% Native American, and 0.23% from two or more races. Hispanic or Latino of any race were 0.23% of the population.

There were 709 households, out of which 29.9% had children under the age of 18 living with them, 63.3% were married couples living together, 7.5% had a female householder with no husband present, and 25.8% were non-families. 21.9% of all households were made up of individuals, and 10.6% had someone living alone who was 65 years of age or older. The average household size was 2.47 and the average family size was 2.86.

In the township the population was spread out, with 22.5% under the age of 18, 8.4% from 18 to 24, 26.0% from 25 to 44, 27.7% from 45 to 64, and 15.3% who were 65 years of age or older. The median age was 40 years. For every 100 females, there were 97.2 males. For every 100 females age 18 and over, there were 95.5 males.

The median income for a household in the township was $34,292, and the median income for a family was $38,466. Males had a median income of $31,406 versus $19,250 for females. The per capita income for the township was $16,189. About 9.5% of families and 11.3% of the population were below the poverty line, including 16.5% of those under age 18 and 6.3% of those age 65 or over.
