= Susquehanna and New York Railroad =

Short-line railroad in Pennsylvania, U.S.

Overview
- Headquarters: Towanda
- Reporting mark: S&NY
- Locale: Towanda, Pennsylvania, Williamsport, Pennsylvania
- Dates of operation: 1902–1942
- Successor: dismantled

Technical
- Track gauge: 4 ft 8 1/2 in (1,435 mm) standard gauge

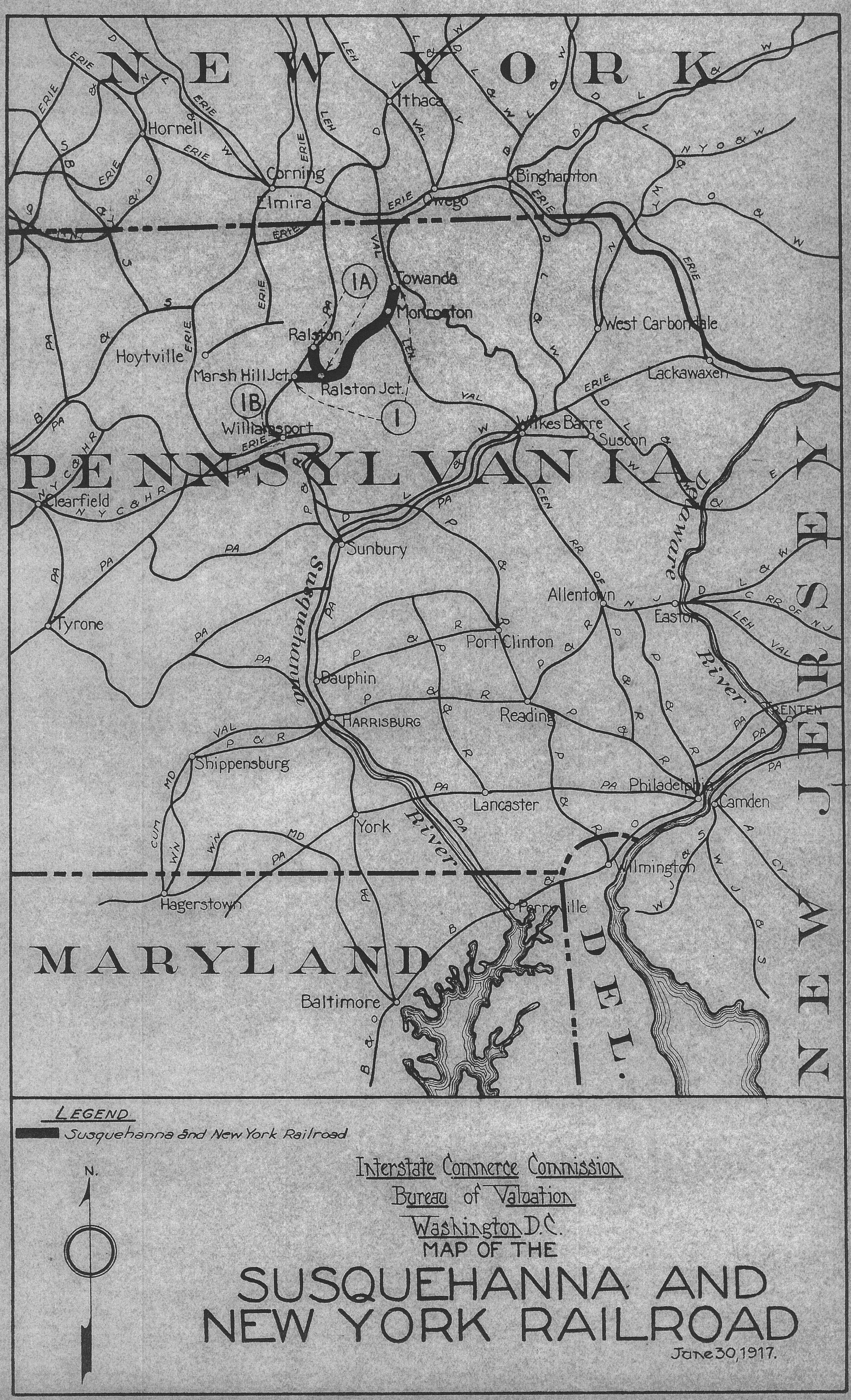
1917 map of the railroad

The Susquehanna and New York Railroad (reporting mark S&NY) was a short-line railroad connecting the Lehigh Valley Railroad at Towanda, Pennsylvania, with the Pennsylvania Railroad at Marsh Hill Junction. The railroad carried freight and passengers between Williamsport and Towanda by rail rather than using the Susquehanna River or the Pennsylvania Canal.

The railroad, 45 miles in length (72.4 km), in Northeastern Pennsylvania was originally built to carry timber and coal out of the Barclay Mountain to Towanda where these products could then be shipped by river or rail.

== Formation ==
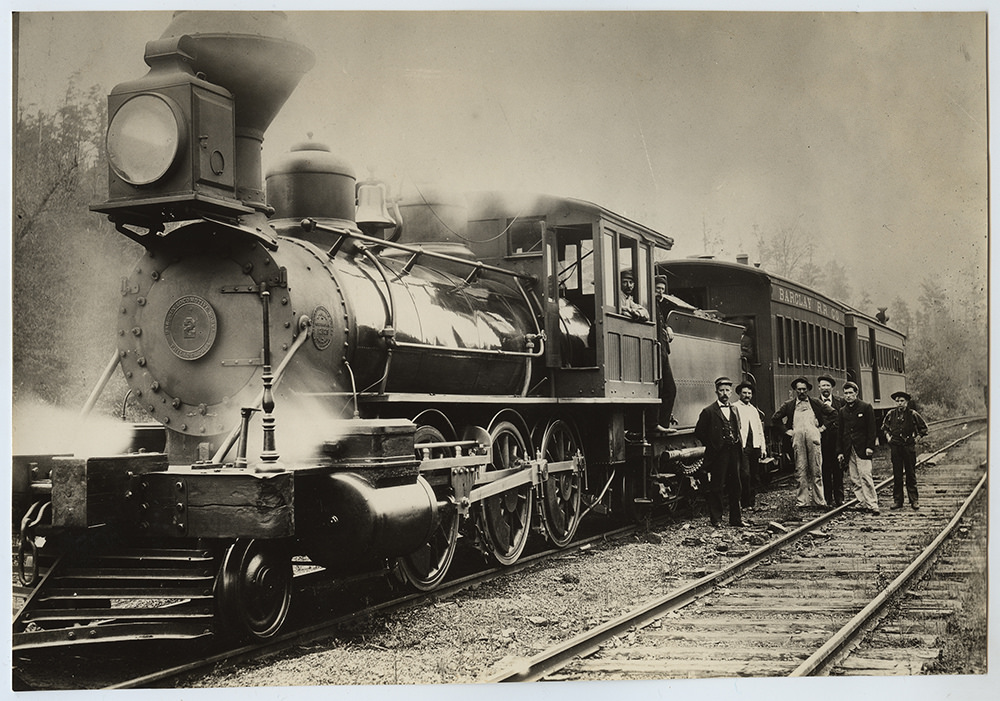
Barclay Railroad, Locomotive 2 with Tender and Cars, 1895

As with many railroads, the S&NY formed from an earlier company, absorbed companies during its heyday, and was later itself absorbed before being torn up to help with the war effort during World War II. The story of the S&NY starts in 1794 when Robert Barclay of London, England came to own 21,000 acres (85 km²) in the region. Little development occurred until coal was discovered on the land. Professor Johnson or Richard Taylor (or possibly both) surveyed the land for a railroad about 1835, but no road was cut and access to the coal was still limited.

The "Towanda and Franklin Railroad Company" was formed in 1853 to create a railroad to the coal mines but no rails were laid. In 1854 the Barclay Railroad and Coal Company formed, and work on the road began. The Barclay Railroad was authorized to hold 2,000 acres (8 km²) of coal lands as well as lands for track, depots, and stations, etc.

In 1856 the Pennsylvania Canal (North Branch Division) was built, improving access into the area and leading to renewed interest. The "North Branch Canal" – another name for the Pennsylvania Canal (North Branch Division) – opened in Spring 1856 and the Barclay Railroad began hauling coal in July of that year. The new railroad delivered over 7,000 tons of coal to the canal boats in the first year. The coal was brought the 16 miles to Towanda where canal boats moved it to markets. James Macfarland, the railroad's first general manager, organized the Towanda Coal company, which leased and operated the railroad for 20 years.

The Bradford Reporter, a local newspaper, said the railroad was 16 and 3/4 miles long on November 6, 1856. The newspaper also reported that the train could pull 25 five ton cars at a time and make three trips per day between the coal mines and the canal boats.

In 1857 the railroad had two locomotives, the "Towanda" and "Philadelphia".

In 1867 the Pennsylvania & New York Railroad and Canal Company (later the "Wyoming Division" of the Lehigh Valley Railroad) connected Towanda to Waverly, New York. Waverly connected to Erie, Pennsylvania and easier transportation to more markets. The Erie Railroad obtained trackage rights directly into the Barclay coal fields.

Significant damage occurred during the flood of 1900 (destroyed bridges, undermined roadbed, etc.). The lumber industry, however, was just beginning to expand so there was a financial driver to make repairs. The Binghamton, Towanda & Western Railroad company bought the Barclay Railroad and rebuilt the road.

== Operations begin (for S&NY) ==
In 1902, the Binghamton, Towanda & Western Railroad was absorbed by the Susquehanna & New York Railroad company. A year later the S&NY bought the Gray's Run Railroad (renamed the "Gray's Run Branch") and added new track into Marsh Hill Junction, located in Lycoming County, Pennsylvania. The Gray's Run Branch, however, was abandoned later when the timber industry ran its course.

1904 Timetable
From	Departure	To	Arrival
Towanda	7:15 am	Ralston	9:15 am
Ralston	8:00 am	Towanda	10:00 am
Towanda	1:15 pm	Ralston	3:20 pm
Ralston	9:30 am	Towanda	11:30 am
Towanda	3:45 pm	Ralston	5:50 pm
Ralston	3:35 pm	Towanda	6:00 pm

In 1906 increased demand for timber resulted in improvements that reduced grades and eased curves. "Bigger rail" was laid, steel bridges replaced wooden ones, and a terminal was built at West Williamsport. The early days were called "harrowing" in one account.

1906 also saw the railroad carry 78,000 passengers and 381,878 tons of freight for a total of $337,352 in revenues. From that, the railroad paid out $48,000 in dividends.

During the Pennsylvania lumber boom one of the largest saw mills, owned by C. W. Sones, was located at Masten. Sones also built a short line railroad called the Susquehanna & Eaglesmere Railroad to feed the S&NY.

The boom town of Laquin with 20,000 acres (80 km²) of timber, contained 2,000 people and a payroll second only to Sayre, which had the Lehigh Valley Shops to maintain trains and broad bottom land making travel easier.

During the early years of the 20th century, the S&NY had two round trip passenger services per day. The S&NY also had regular "Sunday School picnics and wildflower excursions" that required extra cars to carry the passengers. The S&NY was a valuable connection between the Lehigh Valley and Pennsylvania railroads.

== Wartime service ==
When the United States entered World War I (WWI) the federal government took control of the nation's railroads in the interest of national defense. The S&NY was placed under control of the Lehigh Valley Railroad during the war. Government service resulted in improved roadbeds and bridges (paid for by the government). By the time the war ended, business – mainly timber – had bottomed out.

It is unclear how the Great Railroad Strike of 1922 affected the S&NY, which was basically a connection between larger railroads. From 1927 onward, the S&NY was in decline. The Great Depression during the 1930s did not present any growth opportunities. By this time the primary resources of the Barclay Mountain region – coal and timber – were either mined out or not needed, possibly due to other cheaper sources. In 1939, the railroad had a deficit of $18,005.

The Laquin Lumber Company, which had started a large mill in 1902 and drove much of the S&NY business, was shut down about 1920. A chemical mill remained in business for a while longer but it closed in 1926, further cutting into the S&NY business.

== Dismantled ==
On May 23, 1942, the S&NY made its last scheduled run. The rails between Monroeton and Ralston were taken up shortly afterward to run tracks throughout a large munitions plant at White Deer (near Williamsport). That is, the rails were used within the plant to move materials through the manufacturing process. So the S&NY ended its life to support World War II (WWII). The rails between Towanda and Monroeton were bought by the Lehigh Valley Railroad.

== Communities or stations ==
North to south:

- Towanda – connected to Lehigh Valley Railroad with destinations to Buffalo or New York City
- Monroeton – connected to Lehigh Valley branch south to Dushore
- Powell
- Weston
- Lamoka
- Long Valley
- Barclay Station
- East Laquin
- Laquin
- Whalen
- Cold Spring, (Bradford County, Pennsylvania)
- Wheelerville (Sullivan County, Pennsylvania)
- Ellenton—highest point on the road at 2,100 feet above sea level (Lycoming County, Pennsylvania)
- Hillsgrove Junction
- Masten
- Short Run
- Crandellton (or Crandeltown)
- Pleasant Stream
- Ralston (coal spur) – connected to Pennsylvania Railroad leading north toward Elmira, NY
- Heylman
- Bodines
- Williamson
- Pennsdale
- Gray's Run
- Yoder Run
- Wilkinson
- McCrackens Summit
- Frozen Run
- MARSH HILL JUNCTION WAS 3 MILES north OF BODINES, NOT SOUTH OF BODINES

Marsh Hill Junction – connected to Pennsylvania Railroad leading south to West Williamsport

From Marsh Hill Junction, the S&NY had trackage rights for 20 miles into West Williamsport for connections to the Reading and New York Central railroads.

At Williamsport, passengers and freight could connect to the Pennsylvania Railroad, Reading Railroad or New York Central Railroad.

== Engines ==
Some additional information can be found in the Story of the Susquehanna and New York (p. 21). Several of these engines are referred to by number (2, 5, 6, 11, 24, 109) by Jeremiah Shay in his 1914 diary.

No.	Type	Builder	Date	History
100	Shay	Lima	?	?
101	Shay	Lima	?	?
102	0-4-OT	Baldwin	1879	Bought from NYC elevated railway
103	2-8-0	?	?	Bought from PRR; scrapped in 1912
104	2-8-0	?	?	Bought from PRR; 103 & 104 were alike
105	4-4-0	?	1880	Bought from PRR; 105 & 106 were alike
106	4-4-0	?	1880	Bought from PRR in 1903; class A1; scrapped 1922
107	2-6-0	Dickson(b)	1882	Bought from E. H. Wilson in 1903; scrapped in 1922
108	2-6-0	Dickson(b)	1904	Sold to Tionesta Valley in 1926; scrapped in 1935
109	2-6-0	American	1902	Bought from NYC El; was unsatisfactory; sold
109(a)	Shay	Lima	?	Gray's Run number may not have been official
110	Shay	Lima	1904?	Sold to C.P.L. in 1913
111	2-8-0	Baldwin	1906	Sold to C.P.L. in 1913; 111 and 112 were alike
112	2-8-0	Baldwin	1906	Sold to C.P.L. in 1919
113	4-4-0	Baldwin	1907	Scrapped 1934
114	2-8-0	Baldwin	1907	Rebuilt by Baldwin
115	2-8-0	Baldwin	1913	Rebuilt in LVRR Sayre Shops; still in service as of 1941
116	2-8-0	Baldwin	1916	First S&NY engine to have an electric light
117	2-6-0	American	1900	Bought from NYCRR 1926 (NYC #1748)
118	2-8-0	American	1908	Bought from NYCRR 1926 (NYC #2699)
119	4-6-0	Baldwin	1921	Bought from H. & B. T. 1934 (#35)

(a) Uncertain about this number (b) Dickson later merged with American

== History ==
- 1794 – Robert Barclay of London, England came into possession of the land now called Barclay Mountain.
- 1835 – Professor Johnson, Richard Taylor or both surveyed the area for a railroad to the coal mines.
- 1853 – Towanda and Franklin Railroad Company organized but nothing came of it.
- 1854 – Barclay Railroad and Towanda Coal Company organized by Edward Overton, Sr.
- 1854 – 16 miles of track from Towanda to the coal mines finally opens the region.
- 1856 – North Branch Canal company builds canal on the Susquehanna River to move goods, including the Barclay coal, to market.
- 1868 – Pennsylvania & New York Railroad and Canal Company opens a line between Towanda, PA and Waverly, NY, which connects to their main line.
- 1900 – Flood severely damages the roadbed and bridges.
- 1902 – Susquehanna and New York Railroad formed; absorbs the Barclay Railroad and Gray's Run Railroad.
- 1917 – United States Railroad Administration established to run U.S. railroads during World War I.
- 1917 – S&NY placed under Lehigh Valley Railroad (LV) management.
- 1920 – With the war over, railroads returned to private ownership.
- 1939 – S&NY operating in the red.
- 1942 – S&NY track removed to a munitions plant near Williamsport to support the World War II war effort.

== Founders ==
- Edward Overton, Sr., President
- James Macfarland, general Manager

== Other notable individuals ==
- C. S. Horton, S&NY's first president

== Officers (in 1941) ==
The Story of the Susquehanna and New York lists officers and employees as of August 1941 shortly before the railroad was dismantled to support the war (WWII) effort.

- L. C. Warren, President
- John Orr, Vice-President
- R. H. Zinn, Comptroller
- W. C. Zeigler, Treasurer
- H. J. Welsh, General Freight and Passenger Agent
- W. H. Hough, Secretary
- W. B. Strunk, Assistant General Manager
- J. J. Coleman, Trainmaster and Supervisor of Track
- H. M. Miller, Master Mechanic
- H. F. Thompson, Chief Engineer
- L. G. Schultz, Purchasing Agent

== See also ==
- Railway Control Act (March 21, 1918)
- Records of the United States Railroad Administration (USRA)
- 1914 Work Journal for S&NY Worker

== Other notes ==
The following notes may be related to this subject but need to be qualified further.

1. Triumph VII, p. 95–100 (minor reference, diagrams of Westernport yards)
