= Schrader Creek =

Watercourse in Pennsylvania, US

Coordinates: 41.64860°N 76.61607°W

Schrader Creek (also known as Schrader Branch or Schrader Run)is a tributary of Towanda Creek in Sullivan County and Bradford County, in Pennsylvania, in the United States. It is approximately 23.4 miles (37.7 km) long and flows through Fox Township in Sullivan County and Leroy Township, Franklin Township, and Monroe Township in Bradford County.

== Course ==
Schrader Creek begins in northwestern Fox Township, Sullivan County, near the border between Sullivan County and Lycoming County. It flows roughly northeast for a short distance, crossing Pennsylvania Route 154. Some distance downstream, the creek exits Sullivan County.

Upon exiting Sullivan County, Schrader Creek enters Leroy Township, Bradford County. In this township, the creek turns east-northeast, receiving the tributary Pine Swamp Run. Further on, it picks up the tributaries Robinson Run and Wolf Run. It then enters Franklin Township and turns north for several miles. It eventually turns roughly northeast, passing near Pennsylvania State Game Lands Number 36. Over the next several miles it passes a number of mountains and receives some tributaries. It eventually exits Franklin Township. Upon leaving Franklin Township, the creek enters Monroe Township. In Monroe Township, it turns east, picks up the tributary Millstone Creek, and turns north. Some distance later, it reaches its confluence with Towanda Creek near the community of Powell.

Schrader Creek joins Towanda Creek 6.55 miles (10.54 km) upstream of its mouth.

== Geography, geology, and climate ==
The valley of Schrader Creek resembles a canyon. The creek cuts through a plateau made of sandstone and cliffs of gray sandstone are present in some parts of it. Much of the creek is on rapids with cobbles, ledges, and boulder patches. There are few fallen trees on it.

The valley of Schrader Creek is forested for much of its length. It is broader in its lower reaches than in its upper reaches. The valley is surrounded by steep hills that are rounded due to glaciation.

The topography of Schrader Creek is described as "rough and hilly" in a 1921 book. The channel of the creek is sinuous and rock formations made of shale and sandstone are found in its vicinity. Semi-bituminous coal is also found in the watershed.

The annual rate of precipitation in the watershed of Schrader Creek is between 35 inches (89 cm) and 40 inches (100 cm).

== Watershed, history, and industries ==
The watershed of Schrader Creek has an area of 85.00 square miles (220.1 km^{2}). The watershed occupies portions of Bradford County, Sullivan County, and Lycoming County. It is in the drainage basin of the upper North Branch Susquehanna River.

There are a few camps in the vicinity of Schrader Creek. The creek lacks a gauge.

In the early 1900s, the main industries in the watershed of Schrader Creek were coal mining and agriculture. During this time period, the Susquehanna and New York Railroad also followed the creek between Wheelerville and its mouth. The creek was also used as an industrial water supply in the community of Powell.

== Recreation ==
It is possible to canoe on 12.7 miles (20.4 km) of Schrader Creek during snowmelt and within several days of heavy rain. The difficulty rating of the creek ranges from 2- to 4. Edward Gertler describes the scenery along it as "good to excellent" in his book Keystone Canoeing. However, it is relatively obscure.

== See also ==
- List of rivers of Pennsylvania
- South Branch Towanda Creek
