= Loop, Indiana County, Pennsylvania =

Unincorporated community in Pennsylvania, U.S.

Coordinates: 40°53′59″N 79°09′56″W

Loop was an unincorporated community in West Mahoning Township, Indiana County, Pennsylvania. It was named for being near a loop-like meander of Mahoning Creek. Lysander Barrett settled in the area around 1842; an iron furnace was erected in 1847. Before its eventual abandonment, the community had a post office (from 1885 to 1959), a schoolhouse, and a stop on the Buffalo, Rochester and Pittsburgh Railway.

== See also ==
- List of ghost towns in Pennsylvania
