= Towanda Creek =

Watercourse in Pennsylvania, US

Coordinates: 41.605598°N 76.862095°W

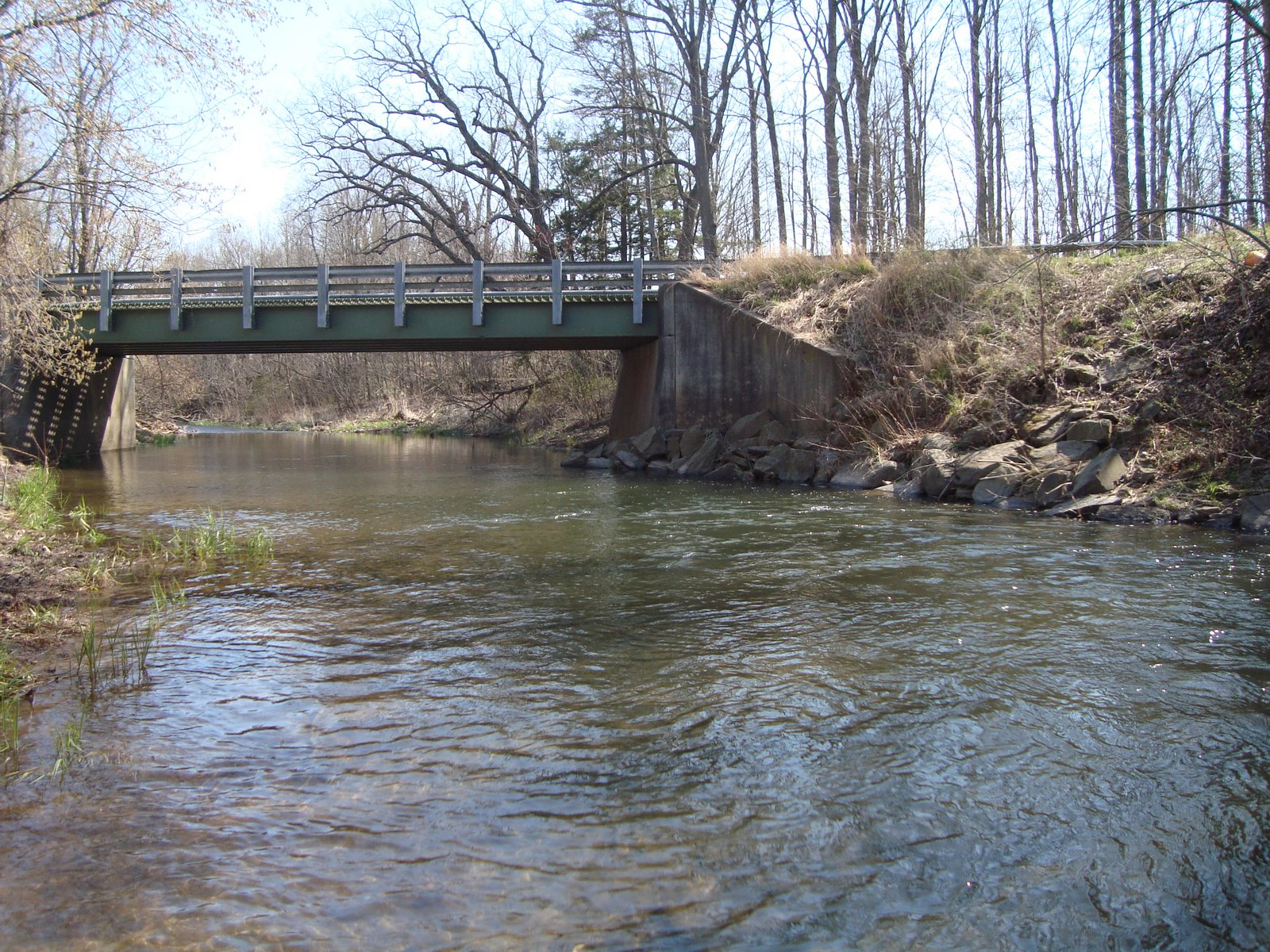
Towanda Creek

Towanda Creek is a tributary of the Susquehanna River in Bradford County, Pennsylvania, in the United States. It is approximately 32.9 miles (52.9 km) long and flows through Canton Township, Canton, Leroy Township, Franklin Township, and Monroe Township.

== Course ==
Towanda Creek begins on a hill in southwestern Canton Township, near the border between Bradford County and Lycoming County. The creek flows northwest off the hill and then turns north, flowing parallel to Pennsylvania Route 14. After several miles, it turns east and passes through the community of Canton and continues east. The creek then receives the tributary Mill Creek and shortly afterwards receives Alba Creek and Beech Flats Creek. It then enters Leroy Township, where it continues flowing east and slightly north parallel to Pennsylvania Route 50. In this township, the creek receives Wallace Brook and Gulf Brook. It eventually enters Franklin Township. In this township, the creek picks up North Branch Towanda Creek. Several miles downstream, it passes to the north of Naglee Mountain and enters Monroe Township. In this township, the creek picks up the tributary South Branch Towanda Creek and turns north. A short distance later, it turns northeast and enters the Towanda Flats. A few miles later, the creek reaches its confluence with the Susquehanna River.

Towanda Creek joins the Susquehanna River 271.72 miles (437.29 km) upstream of its mouth.

=== Tributaries ===
The major tributaries of Towanda Creek include Schrader Creek and South Branch Towanda Creek.

== Hydrology ==
Near Monroeton, the average monthly discharge of Towanda Creek ranges from 80.6 and 96.9 cubic feet per second in August and July, respectively to 611 and 655 cubic feet per second in April and March, respectively. The minimum monthly discharge ranges between 1.76 cubic feet per second in September to 110 cubic feet per second in April. The maximum monthly discharge ranges between 986 cubic feet per second in August to 2287 cubic feet per second in March. Near Franklindale, the average monthly discharge of the creek ranges from 8.46 to 414 cubic feet per second, in August and April, respectively. The minimum monthly discharge ranges between 4.55 cubic feet per second in August to 231 cubic feet per second in December. The maximum monthly discharge ranges between 17.5 cubic feet per second in August to 1000cubic feet per second in March.

The pH of Towanda Creek at Monroeton ranges from 7.4 to 8.2. The creek's specific conductance in this location ranges from 89 to 125 micro-siemens per centimeter at 25 °C (77 °F). The creek's temperature ranges between 0.7 and 24.5 °C (33.3 and 76.1 °F). The water hardness in terms of the concentration of calcium carbonate ranges from 30 to 47 milligrams per liter. The total suspended solids concentration ranges from less than 5 to 452 milligrams per liter.

There are between 8.2 and 14.2 milligrams per liter of calcium in the waters of Towanda Creek and between 2.0 and 3.9 milligrams per liter of magnesium. The concentration of strontium ranges from 40 to 60 micrograms per liter, and there is an unknown concentration of barium. The concentration of sodium ranges between 3.0 and 5.5 milligrams per liter. The concentration of manganese in the waters of the creek ranges between 20 and 450 milligrams per liter and the iron concentration ranges from 40 to 18,500 micrograms per liter. The creek's nickel concentration is less than 50 micrograms per liter and the concentration of copper ranges from less than 4 to 10 micrograms per liter. The zinc concentration ranges from less than 10 to 50 micrograms per liter.

The concentration of boron in the waters of Towanda Creek is less than 200 milligrams per liter. The aluminum concentration ranges from less than 200 to 8500 milligrams per liter. The lead concentration is less than 1 microgram per liter. The concentrations of nitrogen and phosphorus in the creek range from less than 0.25 to 1.3 milligrams per liter and 0.014 to 0.313 milligrams per liter, respectively. The concentration of selenium in the creek is less than 7 micrograms per liter.

== Geography, geology, and climate ==
The elevation near the mouth of Towanda Creek is 692 feet (211 m) above sea level. The elevation of the creek at its source is approximately 1,760 feet (540 m) above sea level.

There are a number of strainers and fallen trees on Towanda Creek in its upper reaches. The creek has fairly high mud banks and flows between forested mountains. Its valley becomes flat and wide downstream of Schrader Creek. There are some riffles on the creek and a few rocky patches near Franklindale.

The topography of the watershed of Towanda Creek is described as "rough and hilly" in a 1921 book. Most of the watershed consists of narrow valleys and steep hills that are rounded by glaciation.

Rock formations consisting of shale and sandstone are found in the vicinity of Towanda Creek. Deposits of bituminous coal are found in these rock formations. Gravel and boulders are also present near the creek.

The channel of Towanda Creek is sinuous. The size of Towanda Creek is doubled by Schrader Creek.

The annual rate of precipitation in the watershed of Towanda Creek is between 30 and 40 inches (76 and 102 cm).

== Watershed ==
The watershed of Towanda Creek has an area of 278 square miles (720 km^{2}). In addition to Bradford County, the watershed also occupies portions of Lycoming County, Sullivan County, and Tioga County. The creek's drainage basin is part of the Upper North Branch Susquehanna drainage basin.

Major lakes in the watershed of Towanda Creek include Lake Nephawin. This lake's surface area is 36.5 acres.

Towanda Creek is on private property throughout its length.

== History, etymology, and industries ==
Towanda Creek's name comes from a Nanticoke word for "burial ground".

A gaging station was established on Towanda Creek at Monroeton in January 1914.

In 1921, the largest communities in the watershed of Towanda Creek included Canton, Monroeton, New Albany, and Monroe. Their populations were 1637, 500, 413, and 403, respectively.

In the early 1900s, the main industries in the watershed of Towanda Creek were woodworking, clay banks, machine shops, and agriculture. The Susquehanna, New York, and Lehigh Valley Railroad also passed through lower reaches of the watershed during this time period. The Northern Central Railroad passed through the watershed's upper reaches. The creek was also used as the power supply for a small mill in Canton.

== Biology ==
There are some wild trout in Towanda Creek, but trout are also stocked there by the Pennsylvania Fish and Boat Commission. Warmwater fishes are more common in the lower reaches of the creek.

During a survey undertaken in 2007, a total of 33 species of fish were identified in Towanda Creek. Brown trout, brook trout, and rainbow trout are all present in the creek. Their lengths range from 2 to 19 inches (5.1 to 48.3 cm), 9 to 13 inches (23 to 33 cm), and 11 to 12 inches (28 to 30 cm), respectively. Smallmouth bass ranging from 1 to 14 inches (2.5 to 35.6 cm) long and rock bass ranging from 2 to 8 inches (5.1 to 20.3 cm) are also present. In addition, the creek contains seven shiner species, three dace species, three darter species, two minnow species (bluntnose minnow and cutlips minnow), and two chub species (creek chub and river chub). Other fish species inhabiting the creek include pumpkinseed, bluegill, green sunfish, brown bullhead, walleye, white sucker, northern hog sucker, fallfish, central stoneroller, and sculpin.

== Recreation ==
It is possible to canoe on 26.2 miles (42.2 km) of Towanda Creek during snowmelt or within seven days of heavy rain. The difficulty rating of the creek is 1 and is considered to be suitable for novice canoers. Edward Gertler describes the scenery along it as "good" in his book Keystone Canoeing. It is also possible to canoe on two of the creek's tributaries. In addition, angling is done on the creek.

== See also ==
- List of rivers of Pennsylvania
