= Tartown, Pennsylvania =

Ghost town in Pennsylvania, US

Coordinates: 39°49′11″N 77°27′10″W

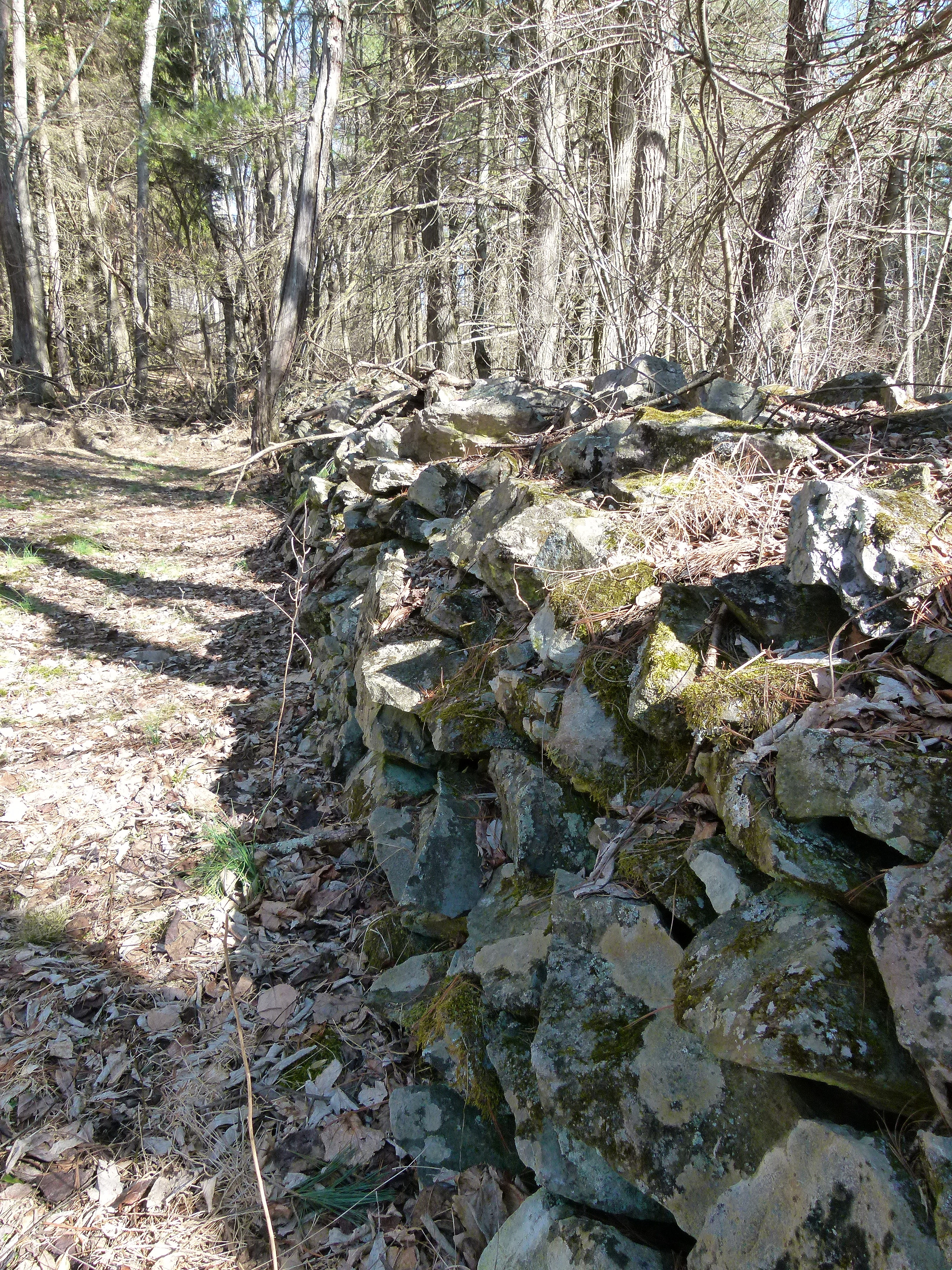
Remains of a stone wall at the Tartown site

Tartown, formerly an unincorporated community, is now an extinct community that was located in Adams County, Pennsylvania, United States.

== History ==
The remains of Tartown are located on property of the Waynesboro, Pennsylvania, Borough Authority and in the adjacent Michaux State Forest in Hamiltonban Township.

The name of the former town reportedly originated from the local production of pine tar. Wagamansville was a variant name.

The locale has in part been inundated by the reservoir that was created by the construction of the Waynesboro Dam on the East Branch of the Antietam Creek.

== Gallery ==
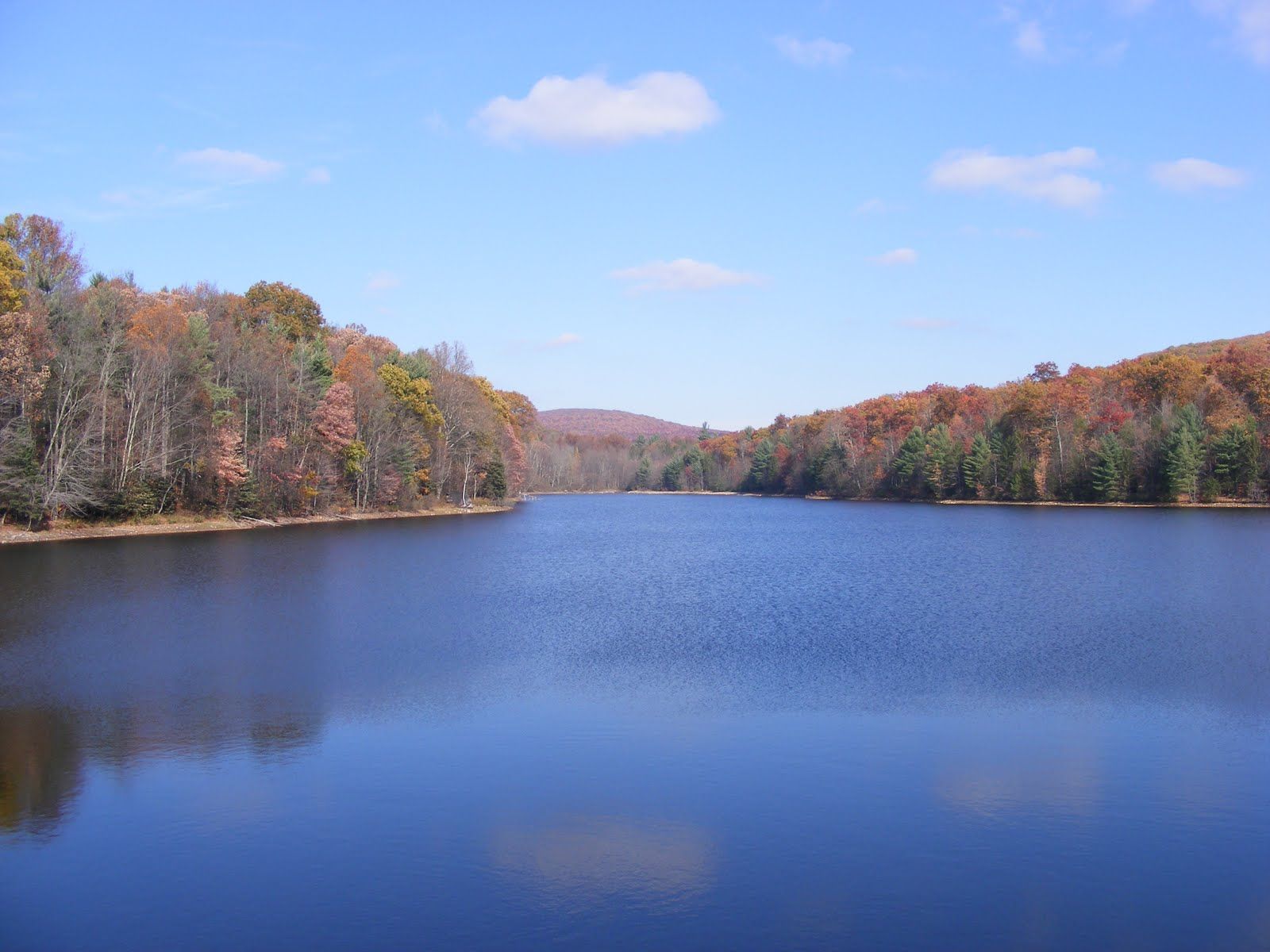
Waynesboro Reservoir, Tartown
