= Beltzville State Park =

State park in Pennsylvania, United States

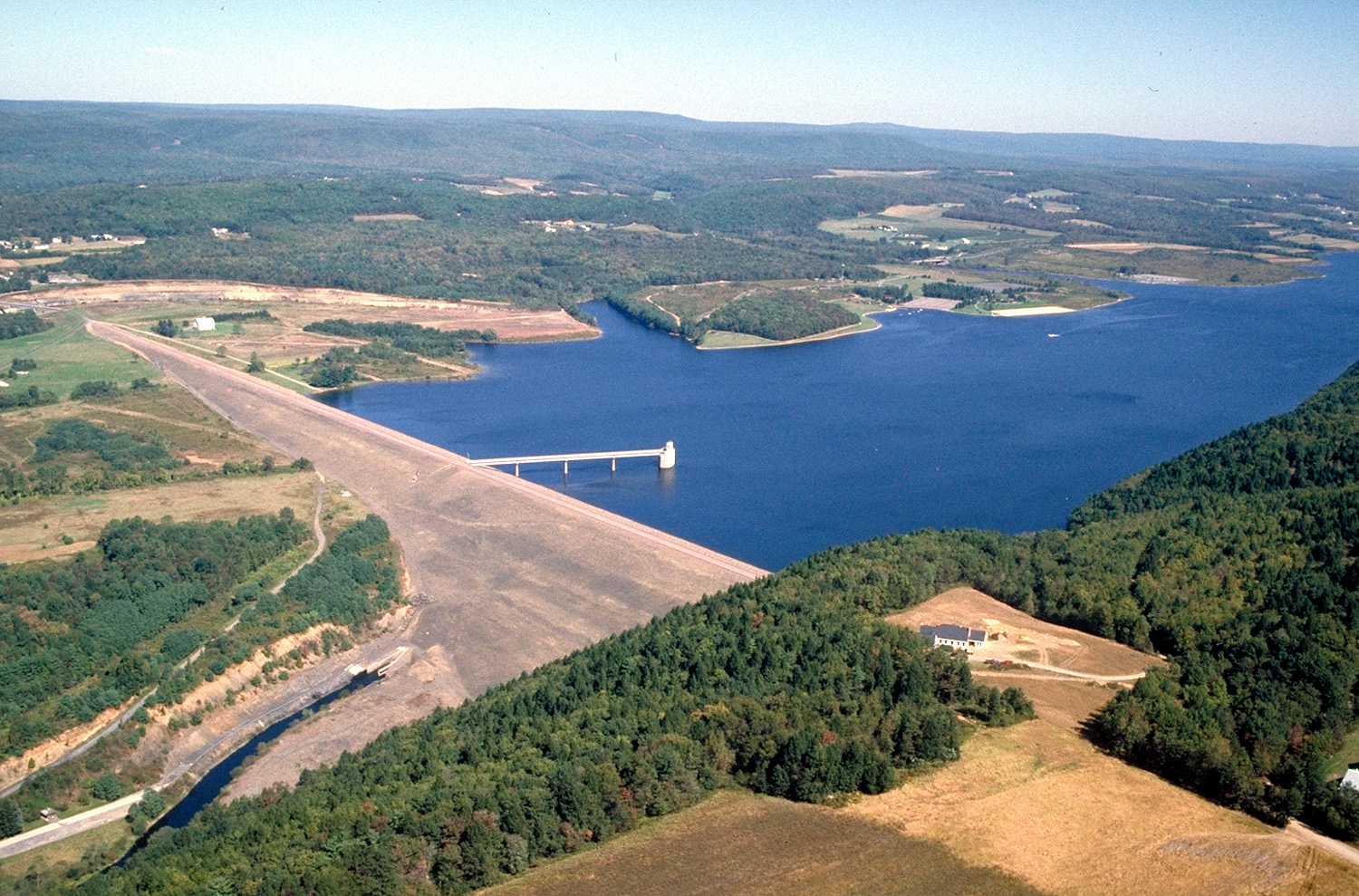
- Beltzville Dam

- Location within Pennsylvania Location within the United States
- Interactive map of Beltzville State Park
- Location: Carbon County, Pennsylvania, United States
- Coordinates: 40°51′53″N 75°37′44″W
- Area: 3,002 acres (1,215 ha)
- Elevation: 633 ft (193 m)
- Established: 1972
- Administrator: Pennsylvania Department of Conservation and Natural Resources
- Named for: The village of Beltzville
- Website: Official website
- Pennsylvania State Parks

Beltzville State Park is a 3,002-acre (1,215 ha) Pennsylvania state park in the Franklin and Towamensing townships, Carbon County, Pennsylvania in the United States. The park opened in 1972, and was developed around the U.S. Army Corps of Engineers flood control project Beltzville Dam on Pohopoco Creek. The village of Big Creek Valley was vacated in 1966 to make way for Beltzville Lake.

Beltzville Lake is a 949 acres (384 ha) with 19.8 miles (31.9 km) of shoreline.

Beltzville State Park is 5 miles (8.0 km) east of Lehighton just off U.S. Route 209. The park is at an elevation of 633 feet (193 m).

Beltzville Lake is a popular fishing destination. Anglers can fish for striped bass, largemouth and smallmouth bass, trout, walleye, perch, and muskellunge. Pohopoco Creek is stocked with trout by the Pennsylvania Fish and Boat Commission.

Hunting is permitted at Beltzville State Park. Hunters are expected to follow the rules and regulations of the Pennsylvania Game Commission. The common game species are ruffed grouse, squirrels, pheasant, waterfowl, white-tailed deer, and rabbits. The hunting of groundhogs is prohibited.

The swimming beach is open from Memorial Day to Labor Day. There is a bathhouse with showers, a food stand, and first aid building at the beach. Recreational scuba diving is prohibited at Beltzville State Park.

Beltzville State Park has four picnic pavilions and several large picnic areas. Playgrounds and playfields are in the area of the picnic tables. Visitors also have the use of modern restrooms and drinking water. A large parking lot and a boat dock are also close by the picnic areas.

There are 15 miles (24 km) of hiking trails at Beltzville State Park. The trails follow old roads, paths in the woods and follow the banks of small streams. Saw Mill Trail starts just west of Beltzville Dam is a path through the history of the park. Hikers will pass the remains of a gristmill, small ponds, an abandoned slate quarry and a wetland.

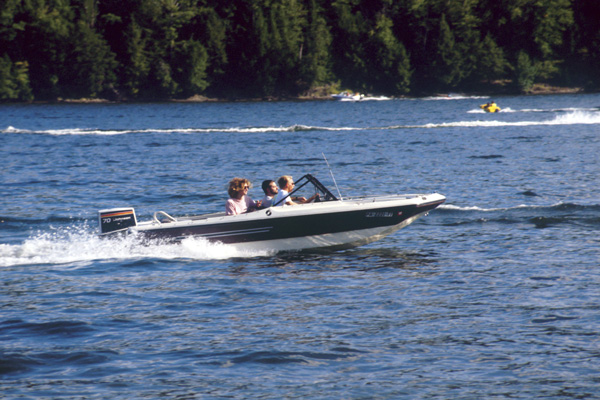
Boating on Beltzville Lake

Beltzville Lake is popular with recreational boaters. The maximum boating speed permitted is 45 miles per hour (72 km/h). Boats with inboard engines with out-of-the-transom or straight stack type exhausts are prohibited. Camping overnight on boats is also prohibited. Canoes and other small boats are often seen in the shelter coves of Beltzville Lake.

Water skiing is permitted only in the south end of the lake in the marked water skiing area. Boats are required to travel in a counterclockwise direction. Boats not towing water skiers or tubers are not permitted to enter the waters of the skiing area.

Beltzville State Park does not close for the winter months, when Beltzville Lake is busy with ice fishing and ice boating. The trails of the park are open for cross-country skiing.
