= Mas ismoru =

Thick beef curry cooked in coconut sauce

- Alternative names: Sri Lankan beef curry, Ceylon beef curry, beef smoore
- Type: Curry
- Course: main
- Place of origin: Sri Lanka
- Serving temperature: hot
- Main ingredients: Beef, coconut milk, fenugreek, curry leaves, chili, onion, turmeric, garlic, ginger, lemon or tamarind juice

Mas ismoru (Sinhala: ඉස්මෝරු, Tamil: இஸ்மோரு), also known as beef smoore, or Sri Lankan beef curry or Ceylon beef curry, is a traditional thick beef curry cooked in spicy coconut sauce. The dish was originally popular with the more affluent classes in British Ceylon. The dish when served is cut into slices, like roast beef, and accompanied with thickened coconut gravy, rice, roti or fried onion sambal.

== Etymology ==
Ismoru is derived from the Dutch verb "smoor", which means "to braise food". The dish, despite its Dutch origins, is distinguished by the incorporation of Asian and Sri Lankan spices. This suggests that the original Dutch stew has been adapted over centuries to align with local culinary preferences. It is essentially a fusion of Dutch-style stew and Sri Lankan cuisine, incorporating local spices and coconut milk.

A similar variation, semur, evolved in the Dutch colonies in Indonesia, using sweet soy sauce and local spices rather than coconut milk.

== Preparation ==
The dish is prepared by slow-cooking a large chunk of boiled beef with spices such as onions, garlic, ginger, fenugreek, turmeric, chili powder, curry powder, curry leaves, and lemon or tamarind juice until tender, followed by the addition of coconut milk and further cooking; the beef is then removed, lightly fried in ghee, and added back to the thickened gravy.

== See also ==
- Cuisine of Sri Lanka
- List of beef dishes
