= Stringtown, Pennsylvania =

Unincorporated community in Pennsylvania, U.S.

Coordinates: 39.910418°N 79.939262°W

Stringtown is an unincorporated community in Greene County, in the U.S. state of Pennsylvania.

== History ==
In 1999, two residents hypothesized that the community may have been derived from the way the houses are "all strung out" or because the road "runs like a string".
