= Ceylon, Pennsylvania =

Unincorporated community in Pennsylvania, U.S.

Coordinates: 39°51′43″N 79°58′50″W

Ceylon is an unincorporated community in Greene County, in the U.S. state of Pennsylvania.

== History ==
A post office called Ceylon was established in 1868, and remained in operation until it was discontinued in 1917. The community was named after the island of Ceylon.
