= East Wheatfield Township, Indiana County, Pennsylvania =

Township in Pennsylvania, US

Coordinates: 40°27′12″N 78°59′44″W

East Wheatfield Township, Pennsylvania
- Township
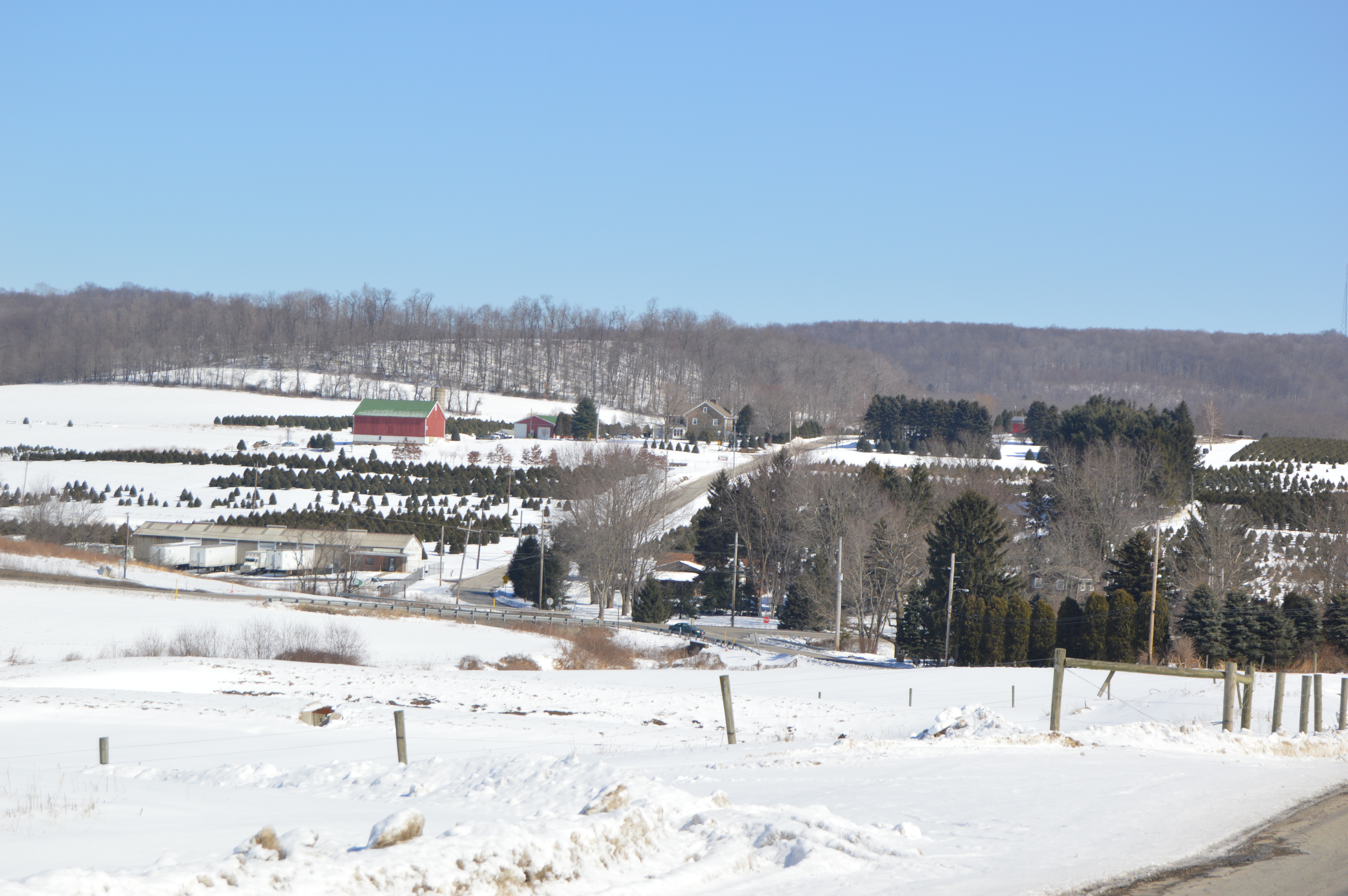
- Christmas tree farm northeast of Seward

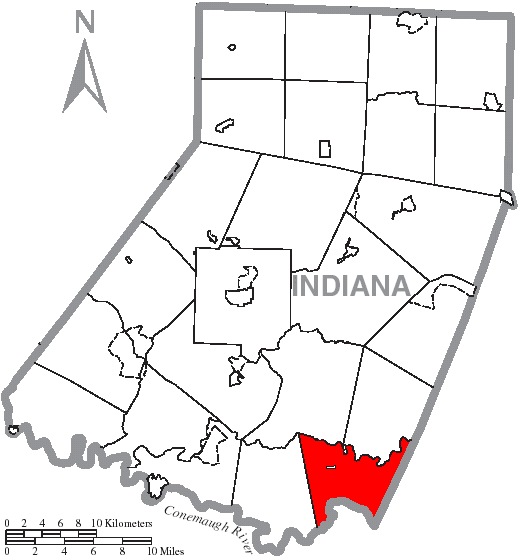
- Map of Indiana County, Pennsylvania Highlighting East Wheatfield Township

- Map of Pennsylvania highlighting Indiana County
- Country: United States
- State: Pennsylvania
- County: Indiana

Area
  - Total: 27.16 sq mi (70.34 km^{2})
  - Land: 26.88 sq mi (69.63 km^{2})
  - Water: 0.28 sq mi (0.72 km^{2})

Population (2020)
  - Total: 2,161 ▼
  - Estimate (2021): 2,153
  - Density: 83.9/sq mi (32.41/km^{2})
- Time zone: UTC-5 (Eastern (EST))
  - Summer (DST): UTC-4 (EDT)
- FIPS code: 42-063-22048

East Wheatfield Township is a township in Indiana County, Pennsylvania, United States. East Wheatfield Township was created when the original Wheatfield Township (formed in 1779) was divided in 1859 into East and West Wheatfield. It was named for the large unforested areas naturally occurring there which were ideal for growing wheat. The population was 2,161 at the 2020 census, a decline from the figure of 2,366 tabulated in 2010. It includes the communities of Boltz, Cramer, Gas Center, Ninevah, Robindale, Shoupstown, Virginia, and Wheatfield. It surrounds, but does not include, the borough of Armagh.

== Geography ==
According to the United States Census Bureau, the township has a total area of 27.2 square miles (70 km^{2}), of which 26.9 square miles (70 km^{2}) is land and 0.4 square miles (1.0 km^{2}) (1.32%) is water.

== Demographics ==
Historical population
Census	Pop.	Note	%±
1860	1,420		—
1870	1,104		−22.3%
1880	937		−15.1%
1890	786		−16.1%
1900	859		9.3%
1910	980		14.1%
1920	1,659		69.3%
1930	1,830		10.3%
1940	2,092		14.3%
1950	2,145		2.5%
1960	2,377		10.8%
1970	2,419		1.8%
1980	2,844		17.6%
1990	2,735		−3.8%
2000	2,607		−4.7%
2010	2,366		−9.2%
2020	2,161		−8.7%
2021 (est.)	2,153		−0.4%
U.S. Decennial Census

As of the census of 2000, there were 2,607 people, 1,026 households, and 774 families residing in the township. The population density was 97.0 inhabitants per square mile (37.5/km^{2}). There were 1,115 housing units at an average density of 41.5 per square mile (16.0/km^{2}). The racial makeup of the township was 99.08% White, 0.04% African American, 0.12% Native American, 0.08% Asian, 0.04% Pacific Islander, 0.08% from other races, and 0.58% from two or more races. Hispanic or Latino of any race were 0.35% of the population.

There were 1,026 households, out of which 29.7% had children under the age of 18 living with them, 65.1% were married couples living together, 7.1% had a female householder with no husband present, and 24.5% were non-families. 21.2% of all households were made up of individuals, and 8.9% had someone living alone who was 65 years of age or older. The average household size was 2.54 and the average family size was 2.95.

In the township the population was spread out, with 23.1% under the age of 18, 8.2% from 18 to 24, 26.5% from 25 to 44, 27.8% from 45 to 64, and 14.5% who were 65 years of age or older. The median age was 41 years. For every 100 females there were 99.6 males. For every 100 females age 18 and over, there were 98.5 males.

The median income for a household in the township was $29,647, and the median income for a family was $33,631. Males had a median income of $31,531 versus $20,822 for females. The per capita income for the township was $14,514. About 9.1% of families and 12.6% of the population were below the poverty line, including 18.2% of those under age 18 and 4.6% of those age 65 or over.
