= Pennsylvania Route 208 =

State highway in Pennsylvania, US

Pennsylvania Route 208

Route information
- Maintained by PennDOT
- Length: 75 mi (121 km)

Major junctions
- West end: US 422 in Pulaski Township
- I-376 near New Wilmington; PA 18 near New Wilmington; US 19 in Springfield Township; I-79 near Grove City; PA 8 in Barkeyville; I-80 near Emlenton; US 322 in Shippenville
- East end: PA 36 in Washington Township

Location
- Country: United States
- State: Pennsylvania
- Counties: Lawrence, Mercer, Venango, Clarion

Highway system
- Pennsylvania State Route System; Interstate; US; State; Scenic; Legislative
← US 206	→ US 209
← PA 277	PA 278	→ I-279

Pennsylvania Route 208 (PA 208) is located in Western Pennsylvania; its western terminus just west of the village of New Bedford in Lawrence County (11.5 miles northwest of New Castle) at U.S. Route 422 (US 422) and the Ohio state line. It runs nearly 75 miles (121 km) to its eastern terminus in the village of Frills Corners in Clarion County (22 miles east of Oil City) at PA 36.

== Route description ==
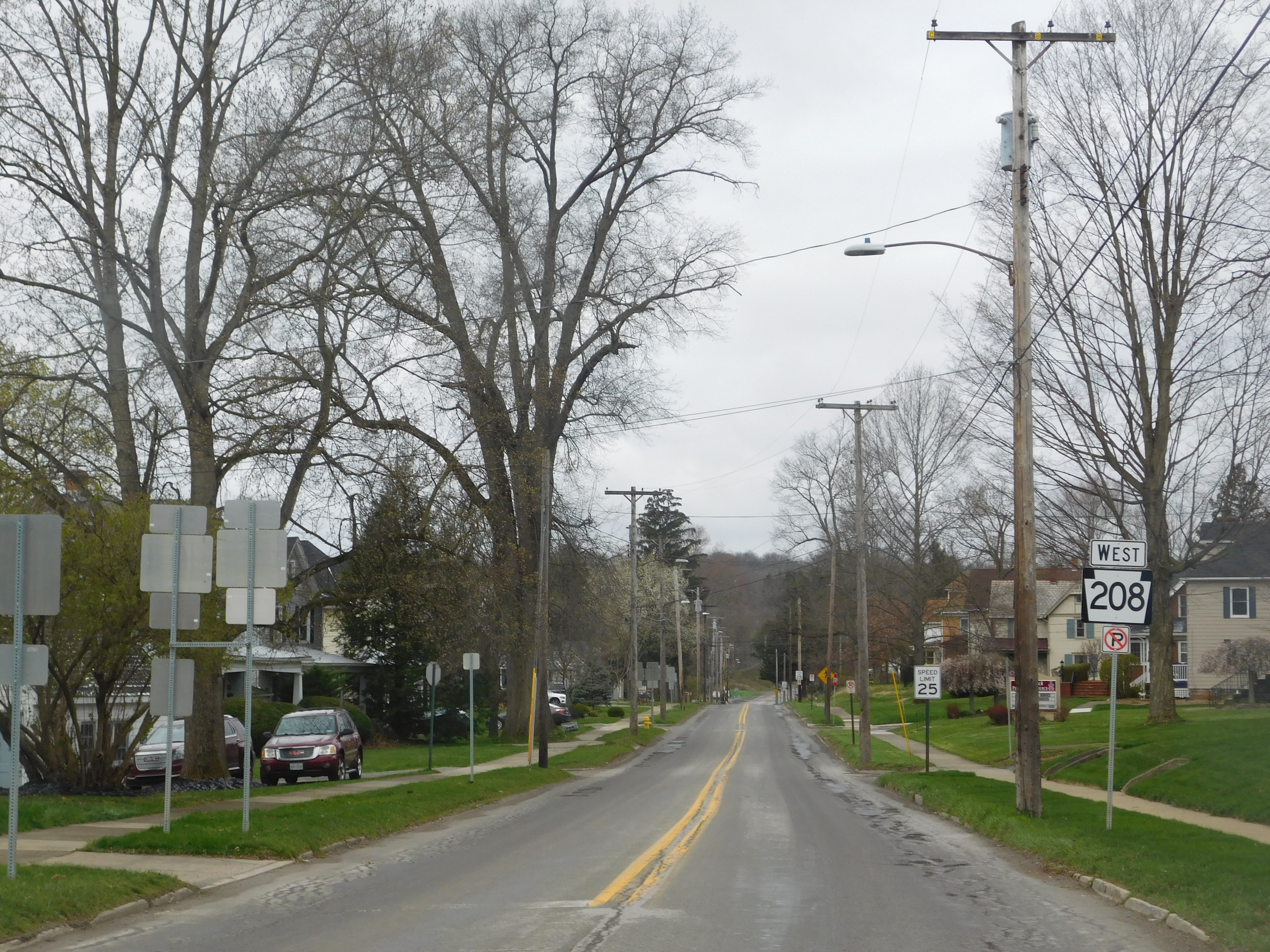
PA 208 west of PA 158 in New Wilmington

The route begins in Lawrence County where US 422 meets the Ohio state line; PA 208 heads east-northeastward to the village of New Bedford about a mile from the state line. The route junctions with the former PA 932 in the village and was the former alignment of US 422 from the state line to this point, where the old alignment turned southeast; PA 208 continues eastward here. About 3.5 miles (5.6 km) later, it is joined by PA 551 and the concurrency turns northward for about 0.5 miles (0.80 km) before turning east again as it crosses the Shenango River and enters the village of Pulaski. The concurrency ends 0.3 miles (0.48 km) later, and PA 208 continues another 0.3 miles (0.48 km) to its interchange with Interstate 376 (I-376). From here, the route heads into a rural area of northern Lawrence County that is home to an Amish community. The road continues another 3.6 miles (5.8 km) east, where it junctions with PA 18 about 1.4 miles (2.3 km) west of the borough of New Wilmington, which the route enters shortly thereafter. In the borough, PA 158 joins briefly, and then leaves the route at the northern terminus of PA 956. PA 208 passes north of Westminster College before it leaves the borough and continues eastward about 3 miles (4.8 km) to the borough of Volant, where, at the east end of the borough, the route intersects with the northern terminus of PA 168 and turns northeast and crosses the county line 0.7 miles (1.1 km) later.

As PA 208 enters Mercer County, it turns east-northeast and meets US 19 at the village of Leesburg about 1.7 miles (2.7 km) later. The routes briefly overlap northward, and then PA 208 continues east-northeastward. About 3.5 miles (5.6 km) from Leesburg, the route is joined by PA 258 north of the Grove City Premium Outlets, and the concurrency then interchanges with I-79 (exit 113) immediately thereafter. The concurrency ends 0.4 miles (0.64 km) later at the village of London – prior to the interstate, this was a simple junction between PA 208 and PA 258. PA 208 continues east-northeast about 3.5 miles (5.6 km) to the borough of Grove City, where it meets PA 58 and PA 173. This point is the western terminus of the PA 58/PA 173 concurrency, and the southern terminus of the PA 173/PA 208 concurrency; also at this point, the north- and southbound lanes of the PA 173/PA 208 concurrency are split on one-way streets through the downtown area of Grove City, heading northward for about 0.4 miles (0.64 km). Another 0.4 miles (0.64 km) later, the concurrency ends, and PA 208 continues eastward, leaves the borough, and meets the county line 4.5 miles (7.2 km) later.

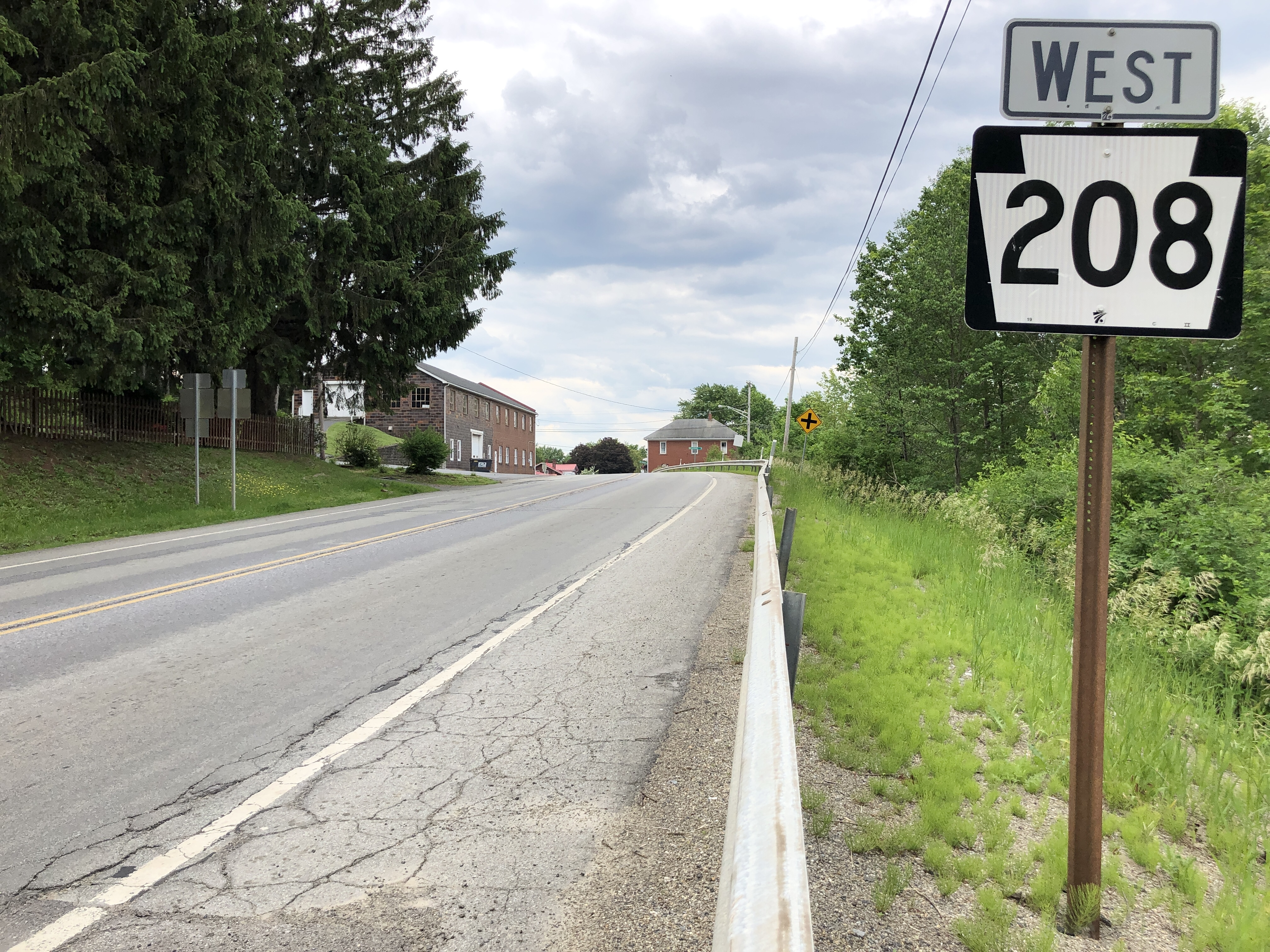
PA 208 westbound past PA 157 in Fryburg

PA 208 enters Venango County, and 1.3 miles (2.1 km) later intersects with PA 8 in the borough of Barkeyville. The route continues eastward 3.1 miles (5.0 km) where it passes over I-80 before entering the borough of Clintonville 1.5 miles (2.4 km) later; here the route intersects with PA 308. About 7.6 miles (12.2 km) later, or 1.8 miles (2.9 km) west of the borough of Emlenton, the route is joined by PA 38; this route, just south of this intersection, meets I-80 (exit 42). The concurrency meets the northern terminus of PA 268 about 1.6 miles (2.6 km) later in the borough, and turns north to cross the Allegheny River. The concurrency turns east at the center of the town, then crosses into Clarion County 0.5 miles (0.80 km) later, winding northward, eastward, and finally east-northeastward, crossing back into Venango County again 1.3 miles (2.1 km) later. The concurrency meets the northern terminus of PA 478 0.3 miles (0.48 km) later; just south of this intersection, PA 478 has a partial interchange with I-80 (exit 45) for traffic exiting or entering eastbound. The westbound interchange ramps are 0.3 eastward on the PA 38/PA 208 concurrency, which continues northeasterly to the county line 0.3 miles (0.48 km) later.

After crossing into Clarion County a second and final time, the PA 38/PA 208 concurrency continues north-northeastward 1.2 miles (1.9 km) before its northern terminus. PA 208 turns eastward and winds 7.3 miles (11.7 km) to the borough of Knox, where the route turns south and then east again, intersecting with PA 338 about 0.5 miles (0.80 km) from the center of the borough. Continuing east-northeast, the route travels 3.8 miles (6.1 km) to the borough of Shippenville, where it meets US 322. The two routes overlap for 0.2 miles (0.32 km) eastward, where PA 208 turns north, traveling 7.6 miles (12.2 km) to the village of Fryburg. Here, the route intersects with the eastern terminus of PA 157, and PA 208 turns northeastward for about 4 miles (6.4 km), then turns north again, where it terminates about 1-mile (1.6 km) later in the village of Frills Corners at PA 36.

== History ==
- 1926-1948 – segment from the Ohio state line to New Bedford was designated US 422.
- 1928 – signed PA 208 from Barkeyville to west of Emlenton.
- 1928-1929 – segment from Pulaski to New Wilmington was designated PA 218.
- 1932-1936 – segment from Volant to Leesburg was designated PA 956.
- 1936 – western terminus of PA 208 moved from Barkeyville to PA 158 via Leesburg Station Rd.
- 1936-1959 – segment from Volant to Leesburg was changed to PA 168.
- 1926-1948 – segment from the Ohio state line to Pulaski was designated PA 278.
- 1928-1959 – segment from Mariasville to Shippenville was designated PA 238.
- 1929-1959 – segment from Pulaski to Volant was designated PA 278.
- 1927-1968 – segment from Shippenville to Frills Cors was designated PA 66.
- 1959 – western terminus of PA 208 moved to its current location, and eastern terminus was moved from PA 38 west of Emlenton to Shippenville.
- 1968 – eastern terminus of PA 208 moved to its current location.

== Major intersections ==
County	Location	mi	km	Destinations	Notes
Lawrence	Pulaski Township	0.0	0.0	US 422 (Benjamin Franklin Highway) – New Castle, Youngstown	Western terminus of PA 208
Lawrence	Pulaski Township	4.5	7.2	PA 551 south	West end of PA 551 overlap
Lawrence	Pulaski Township	5.3	8.5	PA 551 north (Mercer Street)	East end of PA 551 overlap
Lawrence	Pulaski Township	5.6	9.0	I-376 (Beaver Valley Expressway) – Sharon, New Castle	I-376 exit 5
Lawrence	Wilmington Township	9.2	14.8	PA 18 – Sharon, New Castle	
Lawrence	New Wilmington	10.5	16.9	PA 158 south (South New Castle Street) – New Castle	West end of PA 158 overlap
Lawrence	New Wilmington	10.6	17.1	PA 158 north / PA 956 south (Market Street) – Mercer, Harlansburg	East end of PA 158 overlap; northern terminus of PA 956
Lawrence	Volant	14.8	23.8	PA 168 south – Eastbrook	Northern terminus of PA 168
Mercer	Springfield Township	17.2	27.7	US 19 south (Perry Highway) – Zelienople	South end of US 19 overlap
Mercer	Springfield Township	17.3	27.8	US 19 north (Perry Highway) to I-80 – Mercer	North end of US 19 overlap
Mercer	Springfield Township	20.8	33.5	PA 258 north (Butler Pike) – Mercer	North end of PA 258 overlap
Mercer	Springfield Township	20.9	33.6	I-79 to I-80 – Erie, Pittsburgh	I-79 exit 113
Mercer	Springfield Township	20.8	33.5	PA 258 south (Mercer Butler Pike) – Slippery Rock	South end of PA 258 overlap
Mercer	Grove City	24.7	39.8	PA 58 / PA 173 south (West Main Street)	South end of PA 173/PA 208 overlap
Mercer	Grove City	25.6	41.2	PA 173 north (North Broad Street)	North end of PA 173 overlap
Venango	Barkeyville	31.4	50.5	PA 8 (Pittsburgh Road) – Franklin, Butler	
Venango	Clintonville	37.0	59.5	PA 308 (Franklin Street/Butler Street) to I-80	
Venango	Scrubgrass Township	44.6	71.8	PA 38 south (Oneida Valley Road) to I-80 – Butler	South end of PA 38 overlap
Venango	Scrubgrass Township	46.2	74.4	PA 268 south (Emlenton Clintonville Road) – Parker	Northern terminus of PA 268
Venango	Richland Township	48.4	77.9	PA 478 east to I-80 east – St. Petersburg, Clarion	Northern terminus of PA 478; I-80 exit 45 eastbound exit/entrance ramps via PA 478
Venango	Richland Township	48.7	78.4	I-80 west – Sharon	I-80 exit 45 westbound exit/entrance ramps
Clarion	Salem Township	50.2	80.8	PA 38 north	North end of PA 38 overlap
Clarion	Knox	58.0	93.3	PA 338 (Miller Street) to I-80 – Kossuth, Foxburg	
Clarion	Shippenville	61.8	99.5	US 322 west (Main Street) – Franklin	West end of US 322 overlap
Clarion	Shippenville	62.0	99.8	US 322 east (Main Street) – Clarion	East end of US 322 overlap
Clarion	Washington Township	69.6	112.0	PA 157 west (Fryburg Road) – Oil City	Eastern terminus of PA 157
Clarion	Washington Township	74.6	120.1	PA 36	Eastern terminus of PA 208
1.000 mi = 1.609 km; 1.000 km = 0.621 mi: Concurrency terminus

== PA 208 Truck ==
Pennsylvania Route 208 Truck
- Location: Pulaski Township, Pennsylvania
- Existed: 2013–2018

Pennsylvania Route 208 Truck was a truck route around a weight-restricted bridge over the Doe Creek on which trucks over 20 tons and combination loads over 26 tons were prohibited. The route followed US 422 and PA 551. The route was signed in 2013. All weight restricted bridges on the stretch of PA 208 were rebuilt in 2017 and 2018, resulting in the deletion of the route.
