= Pennsylvania Route 157 =

State highway in Pennsylvania, US

Pennsylvania Route 157

Route information
- Maintained by PennDOT
- Length: 13.6 mi (21.9 km)

Major junctions
- West end: US 62 near Seneca
- East end: PA 208 in Fryburg

Location
- Country: United States
- State: Pennsylvania
- Counties: Venango, Clarion

Highway system
- Pennsylvania State Route System; Interstate; US; State; Scenic; Legislative
← PA 156	→ PA 158
← PA 56	→ PA 58

Pennsylvania Route 157 (PA 157) is a 14-mile (23 km) state highway in Pennsylvania. The route runs from US 62 near Seneca east to PA 208 in Fryburg.

== Route description ==
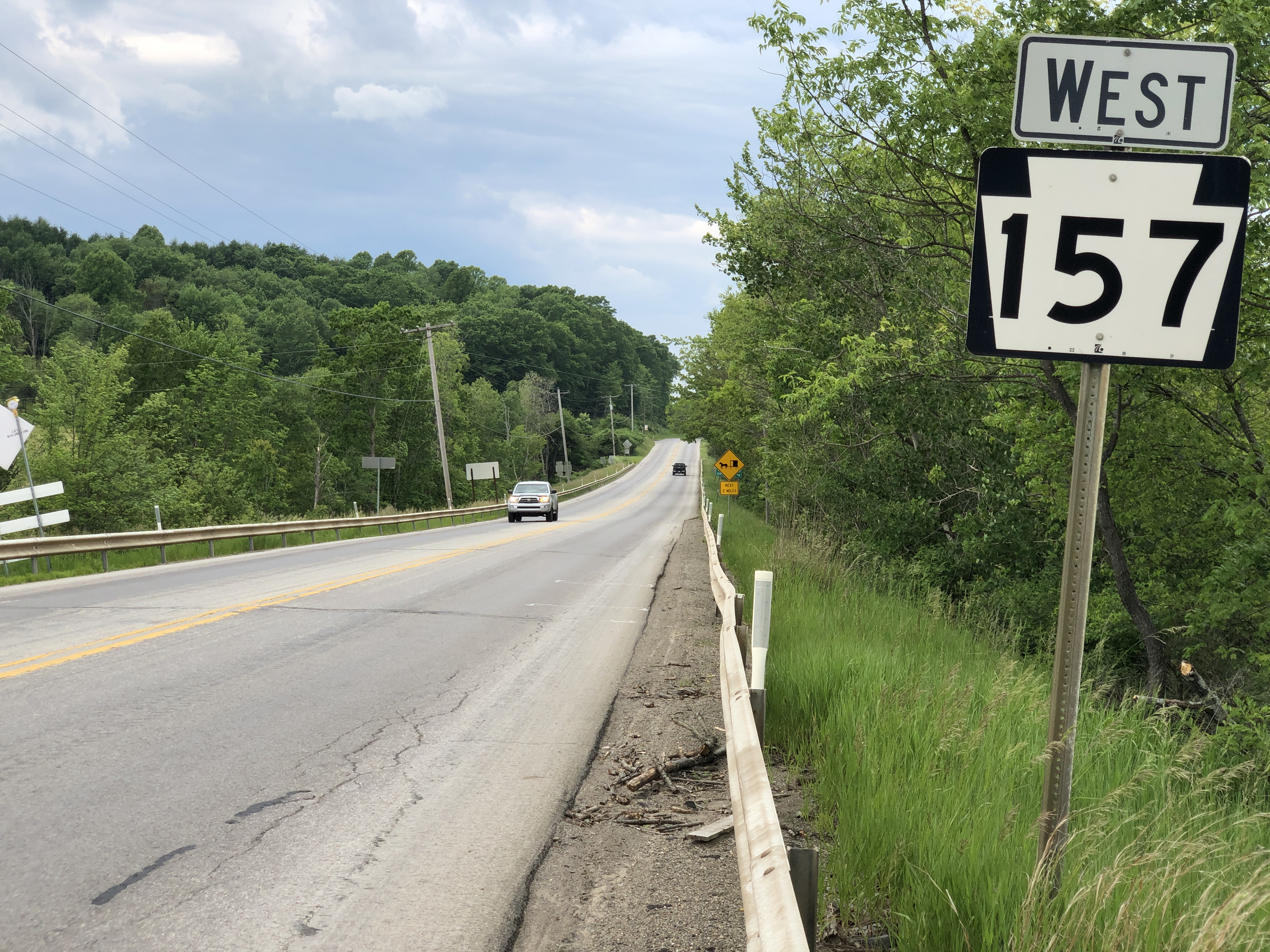
PA 157 westbound past PA 208 in Fryburg

PA 157 begins at an intersection with US 62 in Cranberry Township, Venango County, heading south-southeast on a two-lane undivided road. The route heads through wooded areas with occasional homes, curving east into more woodland with some farm fields and residences. The road passes through Stanleys Corners and Sadlers Corners before crossing into Pinegrove Township. Here, PA 157 becomes Fryburg Road and runs through more rural areas, heading through Coal Hill and Hampton Station. The road continues through more forests with some farmland and homes, turning southeast and coming to Venus. At this point, PA 157 heads into Washington Township in Clarion County and continues southeast through more agricultural areas with some woods and residences. The route turns east and comes to its eastern terminus at an intersection with PA 208, where Fryburg Road continues east as part of PA 208.

== History ==
A portion of the route was once designated Pennsylvania Route 57.

== Major intersections ==
County	Location	mi	km	Destinations	Notes
Venango	Cranberry Township	0.0	0.0	US 62 (President Road) – Oil City, Tionesta	Western terminus
Clarion	Washington Township	13.6	21.9	PA 208 (Fryburg Road) – Tionesta, Shippenville	Eastern terminus
1.000 mi = 1.609 km; 1.000 km = 0.621 mi
