= Venus, Pennsylvania =

Unincorporated community in Pennsylvania, US

- Unincorporated community
- Location within Pennsylvania
- Coordinates: 41°22′00″N 79°28′41″W
- Country: United States
- State: Pennsylvania
- Counties: Clarion, Venango
- Townships: Washington, Pinegrove
- Elevation: 1,575 ft (480 m)
- Time zone: UTC-5 (Eastern (EST))
  - Summer (DST): UTC-4 (EDT)
- ZIP code: 16364
- Area code: 814
- GNIS feature ID: 1190378

Venus is an unincorporated community in Clarion and Venango counties, Pennsylvania, United States. The community is located on Pennsylvania Route 157, 12.7 miles (20.4 km) east-southeast of Oil City. Venus has a post office with ZIP code 16364.

The camp meeting of First Bible Holiness Church, a Methodist denomination in the conservative holiness movement, is held in annually at the denomination's campground in Venus.
