= Pennsylvania Route 173 =

State highway in Pennsylvania, US

Pennsylvania Route 173

Route information
- Maintained by PennDOT
- Length: 45.7 mi (73.5 km)

Major junctions
- South end: PA 8 near Slippery Rock
- I-80 near Grove City
- North end: PA 27 near Cochranton

Location
- Country: United States
- State: Pennsylvania
- Counties: Butler, Mercer, Crawford

Highway system
- Pennsylvania State Route System; Interstate; US; State; Scenic; Legislative
| ← PA 172 | → PA 174 |

Pennsylvania Route 173 (PA 173) is a 45.7-mile-long (73.5 km) state highway located in western Pennsylvania, running from PA Route 8 south of Slippery Rock in Butler County, to PA Route 27 north of Cochranton in Crawford County.

== Route description ==
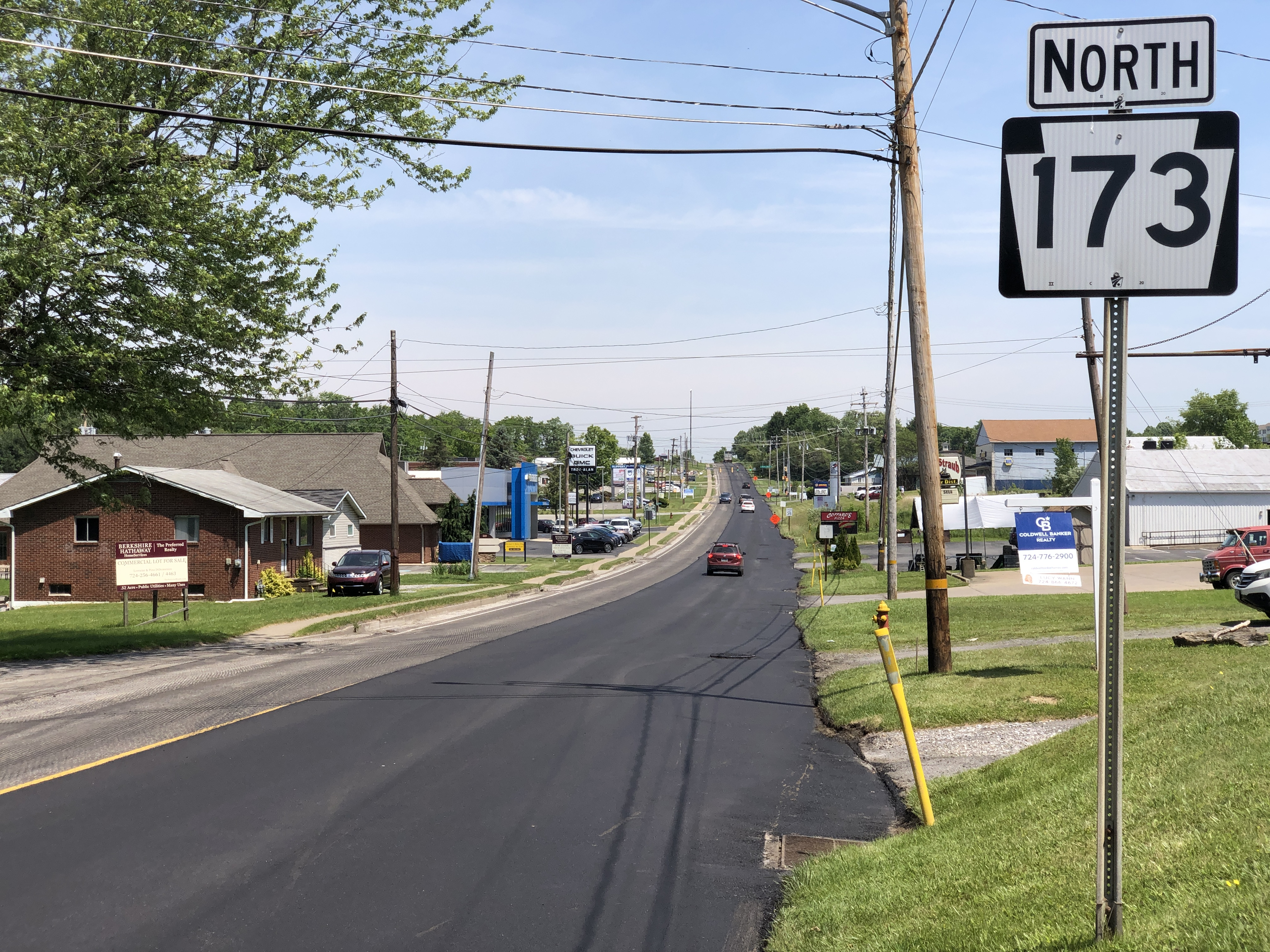
PA 173 northbound past PA 108 in Slippery Rock

PA 173 is designated as part of Washington's Trail between its southern terminus at PA Route 8 and Slippery Rock.

From the village of Stone House at PA Route 8, PA 173 heads north-northeast in Butler County about 4 miles (6.4 km) to the borough of Slippery Rock, home to Slippery Rock University. Near the north end of town, the route intersects with PA 108 at the southern terminus of PA Route 258. Routes 108 and 173 overlap, traveling northeasterly for 0.3 miles (0.48 km), where the concurrency ends and PA 173 turns northward. About 3 miles (4.8 km) later, the route crosses the county line.

After entering Mercer County, PA 173 continues northerly almost 3.5 miles (5.6 km) to the borough of Grove City, the site of Wendall August Forge and Grove City College. The route intersects with PA Route 58, and the two overlap northeastward 0.2 miles (0.32 km). This concurrency ends at the intersection of PA Route 208, where Routes 173 and 208 concurrency northward – for about 0.33 miles (0.53 km), the northbound and southbound lanes run on parallel one-way streets through the downtown area. About 0.4 miles (0.64 km) later, the concurrency ends, PA 173 continues north, and leaves the borough. The route interchanges with I-80 about 2.5 miles (4.0 km) later, and then intersects with PA Route 965 about 6 miles (9.7 km) after that at the village of Perrine's Corners.

PA 173 enters the borough of Sandy Lake 4 miles (6.4 km) later, where it forms a brief concurrency with US 62; the concurrency ends at the eastern terminus of PA Route 358. PA 173 leaves the borough, and just over 4 miles (6.4 km) later, intersects with Georgetown Rd., which is the former alignment of PA Route 285 in the borough of New Lebanon. The route passes through the village of Milledgeville 4 miles (6.4 km) north, and then crosses the county line just over 1 mile (2 km) after that.

A little more than 2 miles (3.2 km) after entering Crawford County, PA 173 turns northeasterly as it intersects with the eastern terminus of PA Route 285, and then enters the borough of Cochranton shortly thereafter. In Cochranton, the route intersects with the former alignment of US 322, and then 0.6 miles (0.97 km) later, after leaving the borough, it intersects with the current alignment of US 322. Not quite 2 miles (3.2 km) later, the route passes through the village of Kasters Corners, and then runs another 5 miles (8.0 km) before its northern terminus at PA Route 27.

== History ==
In 1926, the segment from Stone House to Slippery Rock was designated as PA 8. In 1941, the entire alignment was designated as PA 78 before receiving the current number in 1961.

== Major intersections ==
| County | Location | mi | km | Destinations | Notes |
|---|---|---|---|---|---|
| Butler | Brady Township | 0.0 | 0.0 | PA 8 (William Flinn Highway) – Butler, Franklin | Southern terminus |
| Butler | Slippery Rock | 4.6 | 7.4 | PA 108 west (New Castle Street) / PA 258 north (Main Street) | Southern terminus of PA 108 concurrency; southern terminus of PA 258 |
| Butler | Slippery Rock | 4.9 | 7.9 | PA 108 east (Franklin Street) | Northern terminus of PA 108 concurrency |
| Mercer | Grove City | 11.5 | 18.5 | PA 58 east (Main Street) | Southern terminus of PA 58 concurrency |
| Mercer | Grove City | 11.7 | 18.8 | PA 58 west (Main Street) / PA 208 west (Center Street) | Northern terminus of PA 58 concurrency; southern terminus of PA 208 concurrency |
| Mercer | Grove City | 12.5 | 20.1 | PA 208 east (North Street) – Barkeyville | Northern terminus of PA 208 concurrency |
| Mercer | Wolf Creek Township | 15.1 | 24.3 | I-80 – Clarion, Sharon | Exit 24 (I-80) |
| Mercer | Worth Township | 21.2 | 34.1 | PA 965 (Jackson Center-Polk Road) – Jackson Center, Polk | |
| Mercer | Sandy Lake | 25.4 | 40.9 | US 62 south (Mercer Road) | Southern terminus of US 62 concurrency |
| Mercer | Sandy Lake | 25.6 | 41.2 | US 62 north (Franklin Street) / PA 358 west (Lake Street) to I-79 | Northern terminus of US 62 concurrency; eastern terminus of PA 358 |
| Crawford | Fairfield Township | 37.5 | 60.4 | PA 285 west – Conneaut Lake | Eastern terminus of PA 285 |
| Crawford | Wayne Township | 38.7 | 62.3 | US 322 (Twenty-eighth Division Highway) – Meadville, Franklin | |
| Crawford | Randolph Township | 45.7 | 73.5 | PA 27 – Meadville, Titusville | Northern terminus |
1.000 mi = 1.609 km; 1.000 km = 0.621 mi: Concurrency terminus
