= Pennsylvania Route 338 =

State highway in Clarion County, Pennsylvania, US

Pennsylvania Route 338

Route information
- Maintained by PennDOT
- Length: 13.589 mi (21.869 km)

Major junctions
- West end: PA 58 in Richland Township
- PA 208 in Knox
- East end: US 322 in Ashland Township

Location
- Country: United States
- State: Pennsylvania
- Counties: Clarion

Highway system
- Pennsylvania State Route System; Interstate; US; State; Scenic; Legislative
← PA 337	→ PA 339

Pennsylvania Route 338 (PA 338) is a 13.6-mile-long (21.9 km) state highway located in Clarion County, Pennsylvania. The western terminus is at PA 58 in Richland Township. The eastern terminus is at U.S. Route 322 (US 322) in Ashland Township.

== Route description ==
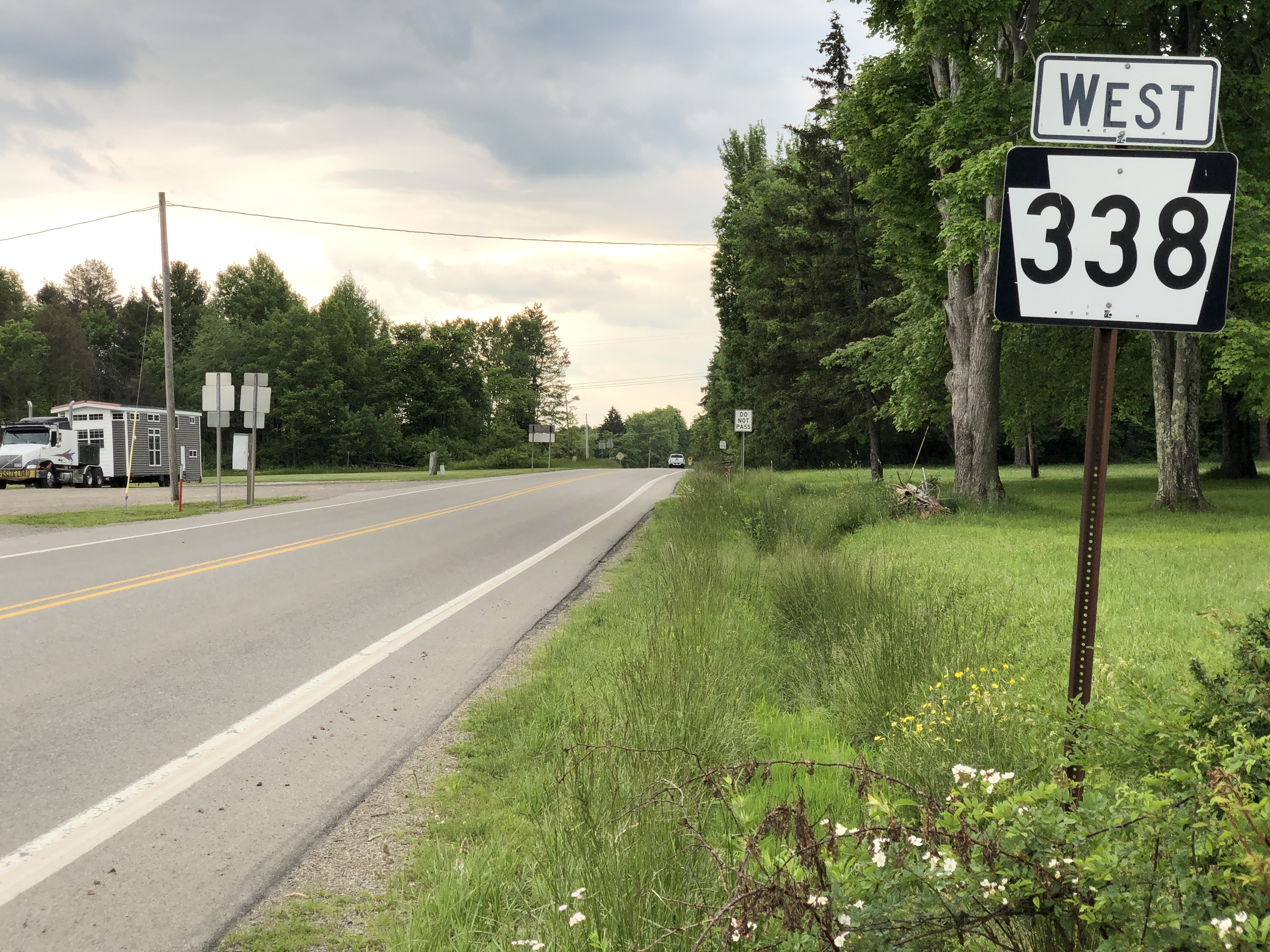
PA 338 westbound past US 322 in Kossuth

PA 338 begins at an intersection with PA 58 in the community of Alum Rock in Richland Township, heading north on a two-lane undivided road. The route heads through wooded areas and passes through the residential community of Turkey City. North of here, the road passes under I-80 before curving to the east and running through agricultural areas with some homes, heading into Beaver Township and passing through Monroe. PA 338 crosses over I-80 again and runs near more farmland before turning southeast through a woodland area. After passing through the residential community of Blairs Corners, the route curves northeast and passes under I-80 again. After this, the road passes through more woodland before continuing into agricultural areas. PA 338 heads north-northeast through a mix of farmland and woodland with some residences, crossing into the borough of Knox. At this point, the route runs past homes, intersecting PA 208. Following this intersection, the road curves northwest and crosses back into Beaver Township, running through more areas of farms and woods with occasional residences as an unnamed road. PA 338 enters Ashland Township and continues northwest through more rural areas, turning to the north before ending at US 322 in Kossuth. The road continues north of this intersection as Camp Coffman Road.

== Major intersections ==
The entire route is in Clarion County.

Location	mi	km	Destinations	Notes
Richland Township	0.000	0.000	PA 58 / Master Road – Callensburg	Western terminus
Beaver Township	5.991	9.642	SR 3007 (Canoe Ripple Road) to I-80 – Callensburg	To exit 53 on I-80
Knox	9.224	14.845	PA 208 (East State Street) – Emlenton, Shippenville	
Ashland Township	13.589	21.869	US 322 / Camp Coffman Road – Franklin, Clarion	Eastern terminus
1.000 mi = 1.609 km; 1.000 km = 0.621 mi
