= Knox, Pennsylvania =

Borough in Pennsylvania, US

- Borough
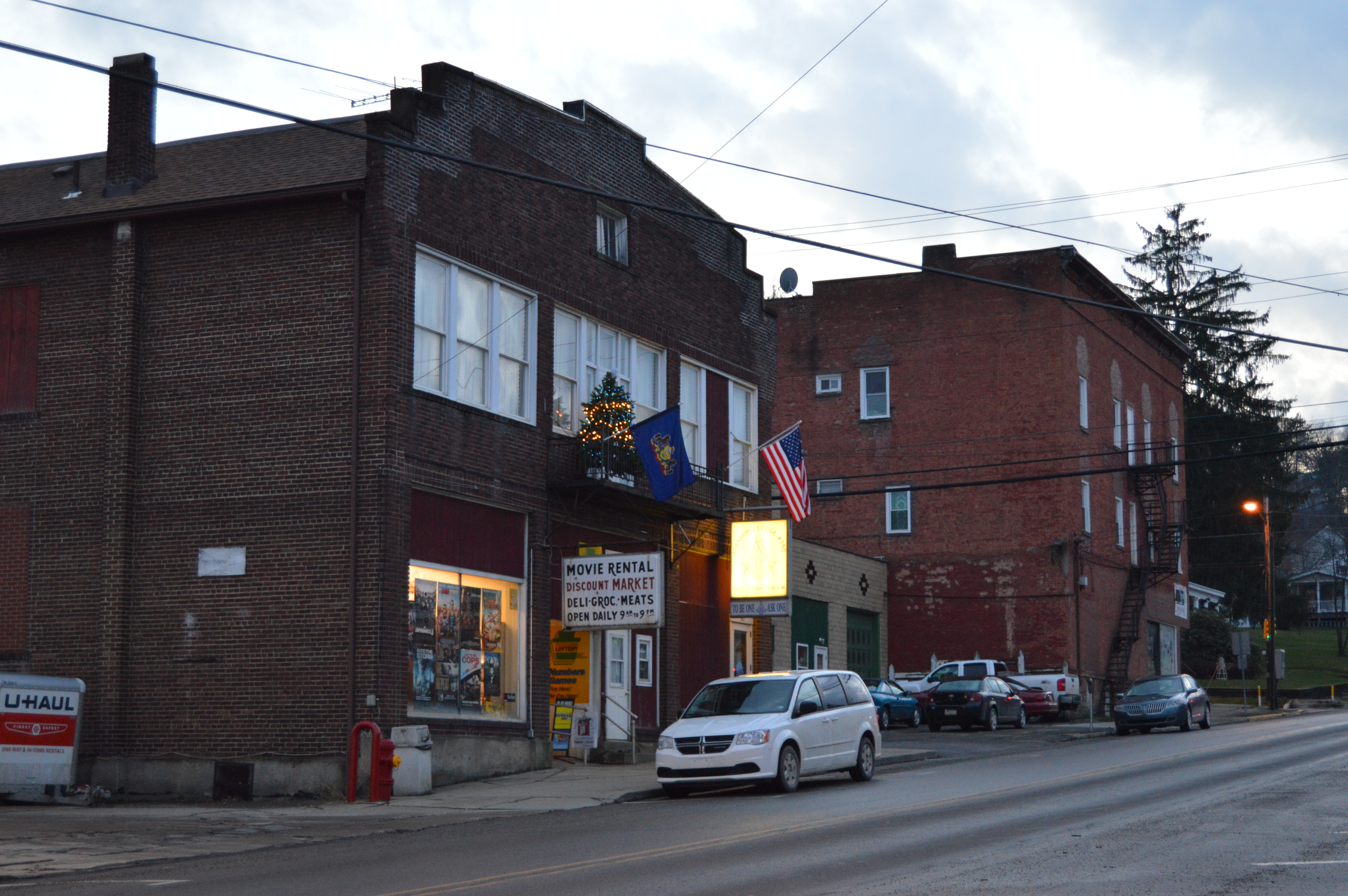
- Commercial district on State Street

- Location of Knox in Clarion County, Pennsylvania.

- Map showing Clarion County in Pennsylvania

- Location in Pennsylvania
- Coordinates: 41°14′07″N 79°32′10″W
- Country: United States
- State: Pennsylvania
- County: Clarion
- Incorporated: 1877

Government
  - Type: Borough Council
  - Mayor: Rich Cochran

Area
  - Total: 0.57 sq mi (1.47 km^{2})
  - Land: 0.56 sq mi (1.46 km^{2})
  - Water: 0.0039 sq mi (0.01 km^{2})
- Elevation: 1,390 ft (420 m)

Population (2020)
  - Total: 1,093
  - Density: 1,944/sq mi (750.6/km^{2})
- Time zone: UTC-5 (Eastern (EST))
  - Summer (DST): UTC-4 (EDT)
- ZIP code: 16232
- FIPS code: 42-40272
- Website: www.knoxborough.com

Knox is a borough in Clarion County, Pennsylvania, United States. The population was 1,102 at the 2020 census.

== Geography ==
Knox is located northwest of the center of Clarion County at 41°14′7″N 79°32′10″W (41.235317, -79.536123). Pennsylvania Route 208 passes through the center of the borough, leading east 4 miles (6 km) to U.S. Route 322 at Shippenville, PA and west 11 miles (18 km) to Emlenton, PA. Pennsylvania Route 338 runs through the eastern side of Knox as a two-lane bypass; it leads north 4 miles (6 km) to US 322 and south four miles to Interstate 80. Clarion, the county seat, is 9 miles (14 km) to the east via Shippenville.

According to the United States Census Bureau, Knox has a total area of 0.57 square miles (1.47 km^{2}), of which 0.004 square miles (0.01 km^{2}), or 0.68%, is water.

== Demographics ==
Historical population
Census	Pop.	Note	%±
1880	1,020		—
1890	751		−26.4%
1900	704		−6.3%
1910	616		−12.5%
1920	806		30.8%
1930	1,037		28.7%
1940	1,098		5.9%
1950	1,213		10.5%
1960	1,247		2.8%
1970	1,306		4.7%
1980	1,364		4.4%
1990	1,182		−13.3%
2000	1,176		−0.5%
2010	1,146		−2.6%
2020	1,093		−4.6%
2021 (est.)	1,099	▲	0.5%

As of the census of 2000, there were 1,176 people, 528 households, and 337 families residing in the borough. The population density was 2,056.0 inhabitants per square mile (793.8/km^{2}). There were 570 housing units at an average density of 996.5 per square mile (384.8/km^{2}). The racial makeup of the borough was 98.98% White, 0.60% Native American, 0.17% Asian, and 0.26% from two or more races. Hispanic or Latino of any race were 0.85% of the population.

There were 528 households, out of which 26.7% had children under the age of 18 living with them, 50.6% were married couples living together, 10.6% had a female householder with no husband present, and 36.0% were non-families. 32.2% of all households were made up of individuals, and 13.8% had someone living alone who was 65 years of age or older. The average household size was 2.23 and the average family size was 2.79.

In the borough the population was spread out, with 22.7% under the age of 18, 6.5% from 18 to 24, 26.8% from 25 to 44, 25.6% from 45 to 64, and 18.4% who were 65 years of age or older. The median age was 41 years. For every 100 females there were 87.6 males. For every 100 females age 18 and over, there were 84.8 males.

The median income for a household in the borough was $32,407, and the median income for a family was $37,431. Males had a median income of $31,908 versus $18,603 for females. The per capita income for the borough was $18,043. About 12.2% of families and 14.5% of the population were below the poverty line, including 25.1% of those under age 18 and 11.9% of those age 65 or over.

== Leadership ==
Knox Borough is governed by an elected seven-member council including a mayor, president, vice-president, and councillors. As of 2024 the mayor was Kirsten Wolfe.

== Notable person ==
- Ross A. McGinnis, a 19-year-old Knox native, killed in action in Iraq on December 4, 2006, and awarded the Medal of Honor.
