= Amsterdam, Pennsylvania =

Unincorporated community in Pennsylvania, US

Amsterdam
- Unincorporated community
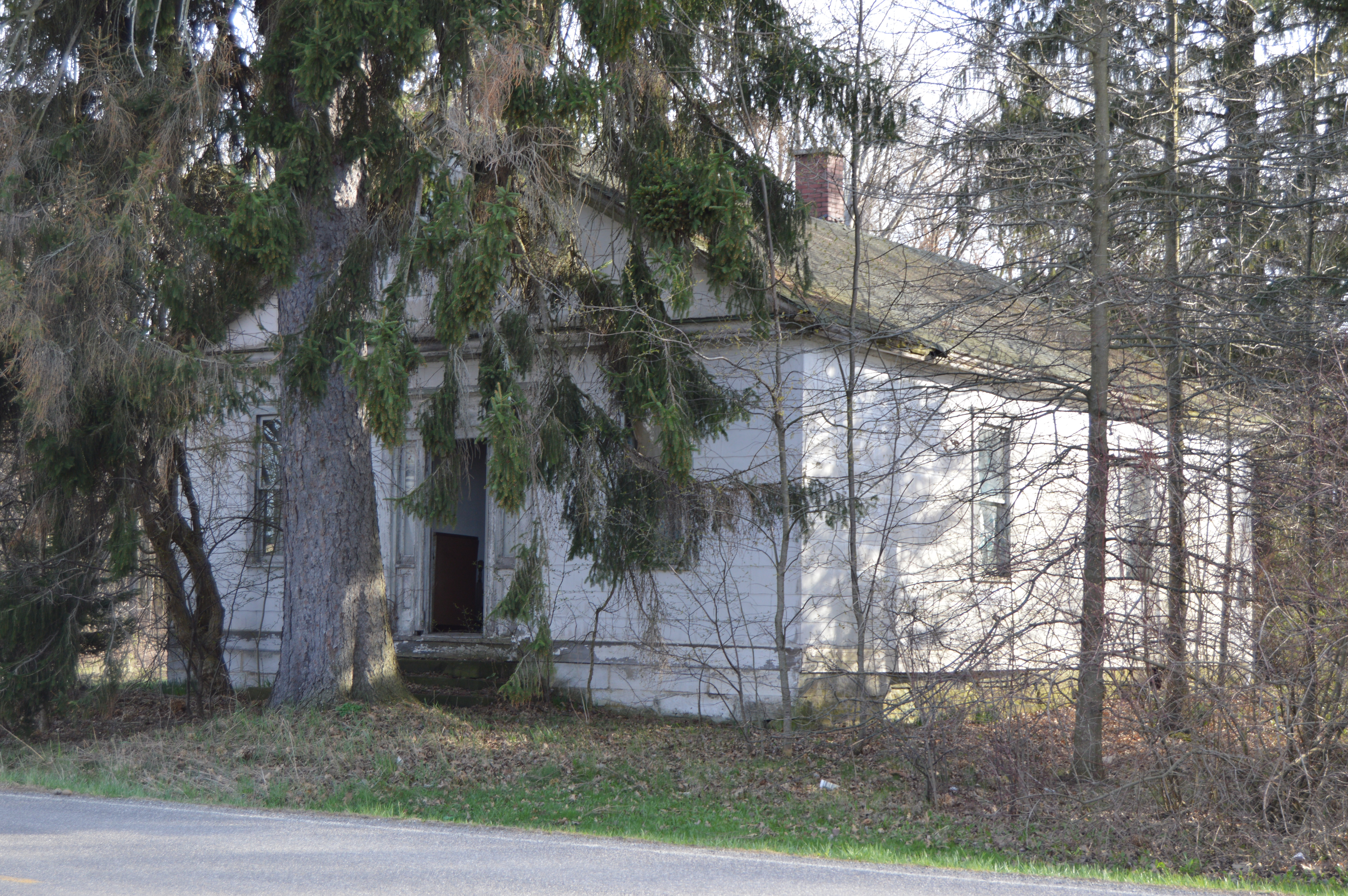
- Abandoned Greek Revival house on Pennsylvania Route 258

- Location within Pennsylvania Location within the contiguous United States Location within North America
- Coordinates: 41°08′02″N 80°08′01″W
- Country: United States
- State: Pennsylvania
- County: Mercer County

Amsterdam is an unincorporated community in Mercer County, in the U.S. state of Pennsylvania.

== History ==
A large share of the early settlers being natives of the Netherlands caused the name Amsterdam to be selected.
