= Kossuth, Pennsylvania =

Unincorporated community in Pennsylvania, US

- Unincorporated community
- Location within Pennsylvania
- Coordinates: 41°17′05″N 79°34′26″W
- Country: United States
- State: Pennsylvania
- County: Clarion
- Elevation: 1,545 ft (471 m)
- Time zone: UTC-5 (Eastern (EST))
  - Summer (DST): UTC-4 (EDT)
- ZIP code: 16311
- Area code: 814
- GNIS feature ID: 1178657

Kossuth is an unincorporated community in Clarion County, Pennsylvania, United States. The community is located at the intersection of U.S. Route 322 and Pennsylvania Route 338, 6.4 miles (10.3 km) west-northwest of Shippenville. Kossuth has a post office with ZIP code 16331, which opened on October 16, 1849.
