= Pennsylvania Route 158 =

State highway in Pennsylvania, US

Pennsylvania Route 158

Route information
- Maintained by PennDOT
- Length: 11.864 mi (19.093 km)

Major junctions
- South end: PA 18 south of New Wilmington
- North end: US 62 / PA 258 in Mercer

Location
- Country: United States
- State: Pennsylvania
- Counties: Lawrence, Mercer

Highway system
- Pennsylvania State Route System; Interstate; US; State; Scenic; Legislative
← PA 157	→ PA 159

Pennsylvania Route 158 (PA 158) is an 11.9-mile-long (19.2 km) state highway located in western Pennsylvania, running from PA 18 south of New Wilmington in Lawrence County, to US 62 and PA 258 in Mercer in Mercer County.

== Route description ==
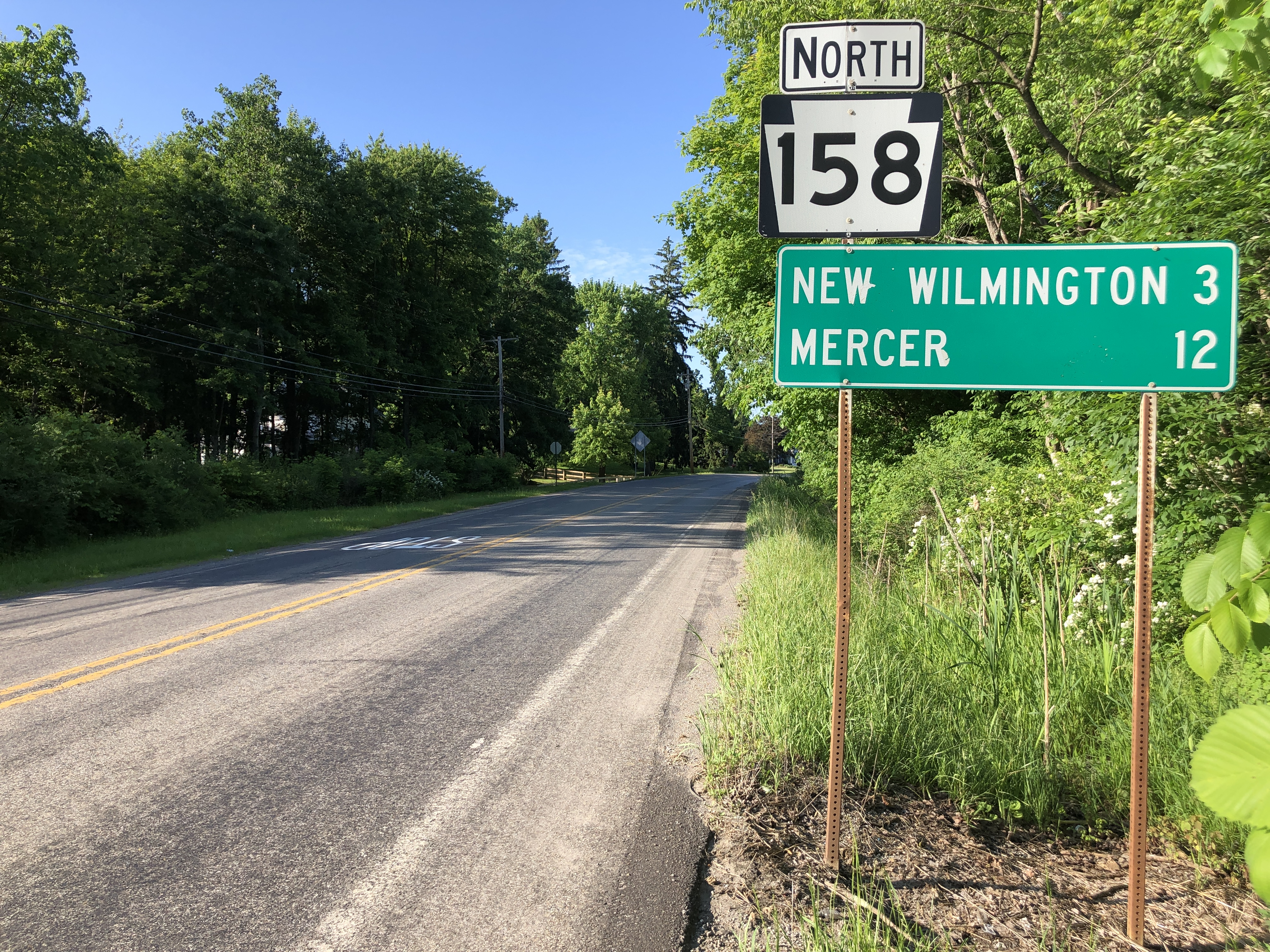
PA 158 northbound past PA 18 in Wilmington Township

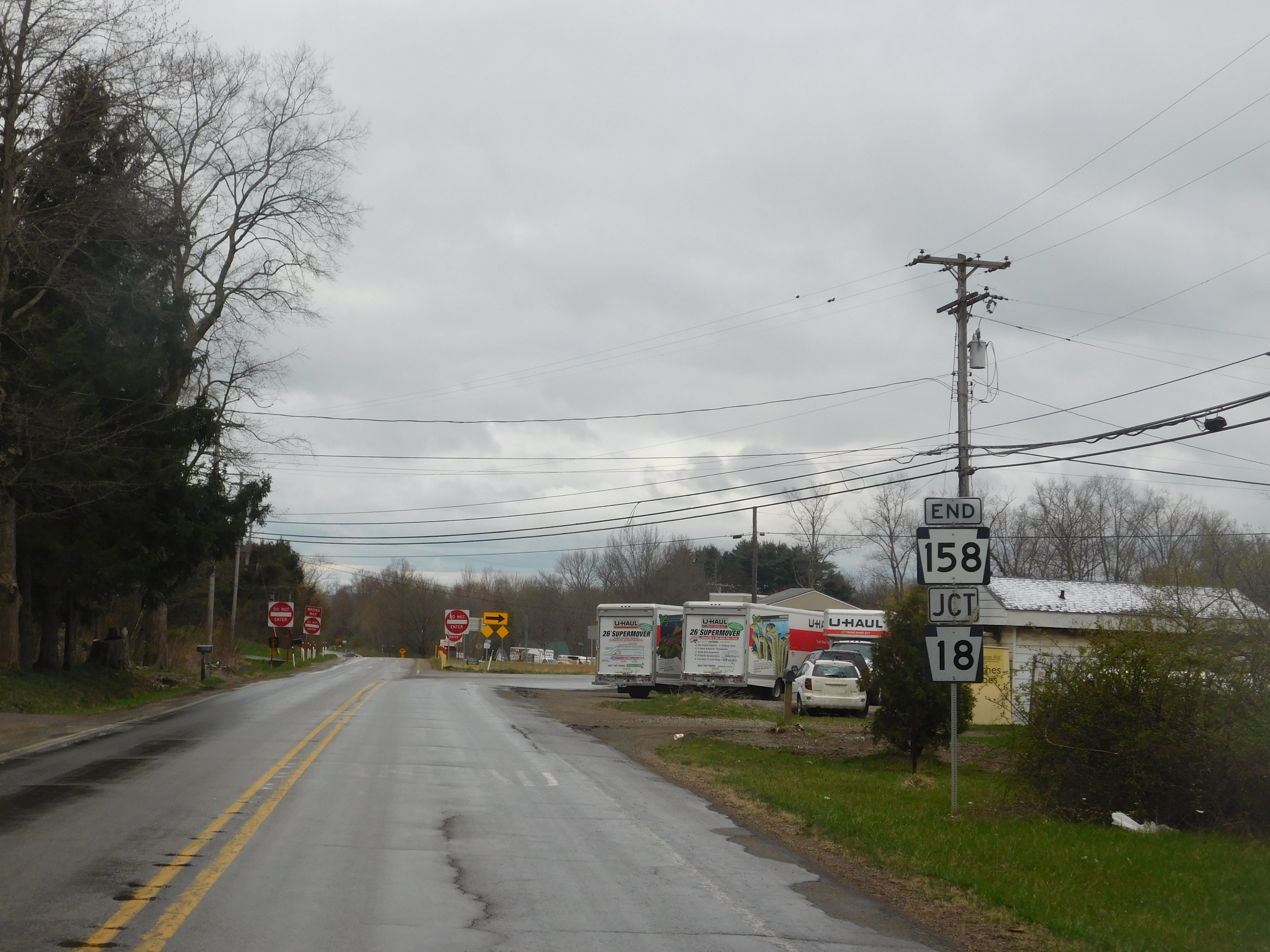
PA 158 approaching PA 18 in Wilmington Township

Traveling north from PA 18, PA 158 heads through a rural area of northern Lawrence County that is home to an Amish community and into the borough of New Wilmington, where it passes Westminster College and intersects with PA 208. The two routes briefly overlap eastbound; at the intersection with PA 956, the concurrency ends, and PA 158 continues northward. As it leaves the borough, it enters Mercer County and winds northeasterly through rural countryside nearly 6 miles (9.7 km) before it passes over I-80. Approximately 3 miles (4.8 km) later, the route enters the borough of Mercer, where it meets the eastern terminus of PA 318 just one block before its own northern terminus at the US 62/PA 258 concurrency.

== History ==
In 1927, what is now PA 158 was originally designated part of PA 18. A year later, the road was signed as PA 158 when PA 18 was moved to its current alignment between PA 158 and Greenville.

== Major intersections ==
County	Location	mi	km	Destinations	Notes
Lawrence	Wilmington Township	0.000	0.000	PA 18 – New Castle	Southern terminus of PA 158
Lawrence	New Wilmington	2.786	4.484	PA 208 west (Neshannock Avenue) / New Castle Street – Pulaski	Western terminus of PA 208 concurrency
Lawrence	New Wilmington	2.912	4.686	PA 208 east (Neshannock Avenue) / PA 956 south (South Market Street) – Volant, Harlansburg	Eastern terminus of PA 208 concurrency; northern terminus of PA 956
Mercer	Mercer	11.757	18.921	PA 318 west (West Butler Street)	Eastern terminus of PA 318
Mercer	Mercer	11.864	19.093	US 62 / PA 258 – Hermitage, Sharon	Northern terminus of PA 158
1.000 mi = 1.609 km; 1.000 km = 0.621 mi: Concurrency terminus

== PA 158 Alternate Truck ==
PA Route 158 Alternate Truck
- Location: Mercer, Pennsylvania
- Existed: 2013–2020

Pennsylvania Route 158 Alternate Truck was a truck route around a weight-restricted bridge over the Brandy Run on which trucks over 28 tons and combination loads over 37 tons were prohibited in Mercer, Pennsylvania. The route followed PA 208, US 19, and US 62. It was signed in 2013. The bridge was completely reconstructed in 2020, and the route was deleted as a result.
