= Ashland Township, Pennsylvania =

Township in Pennsylvania, US

Coordinates: 41°16′29″N 79°33′58″W

- Township
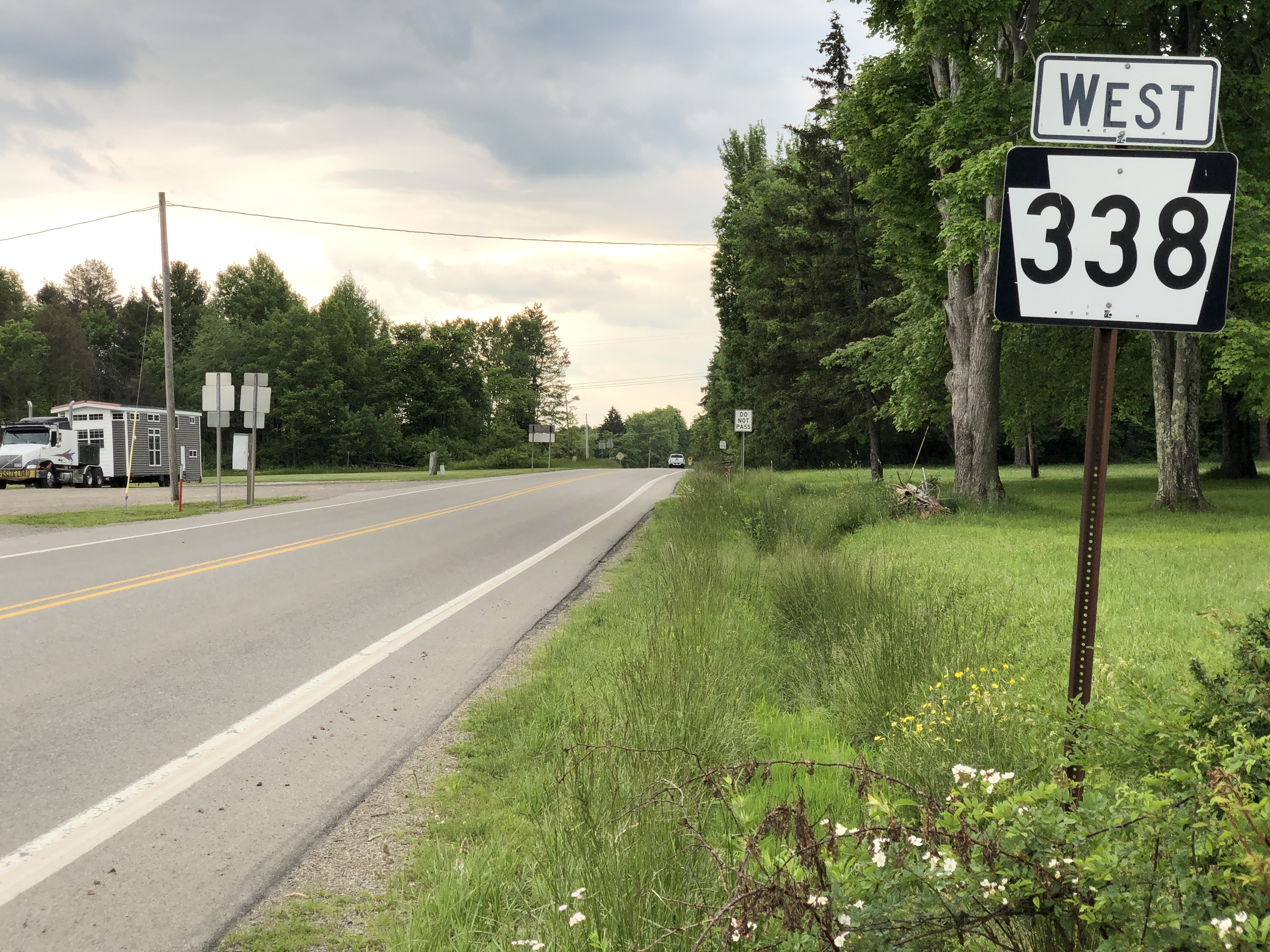
- PA 338 in Ashland Township

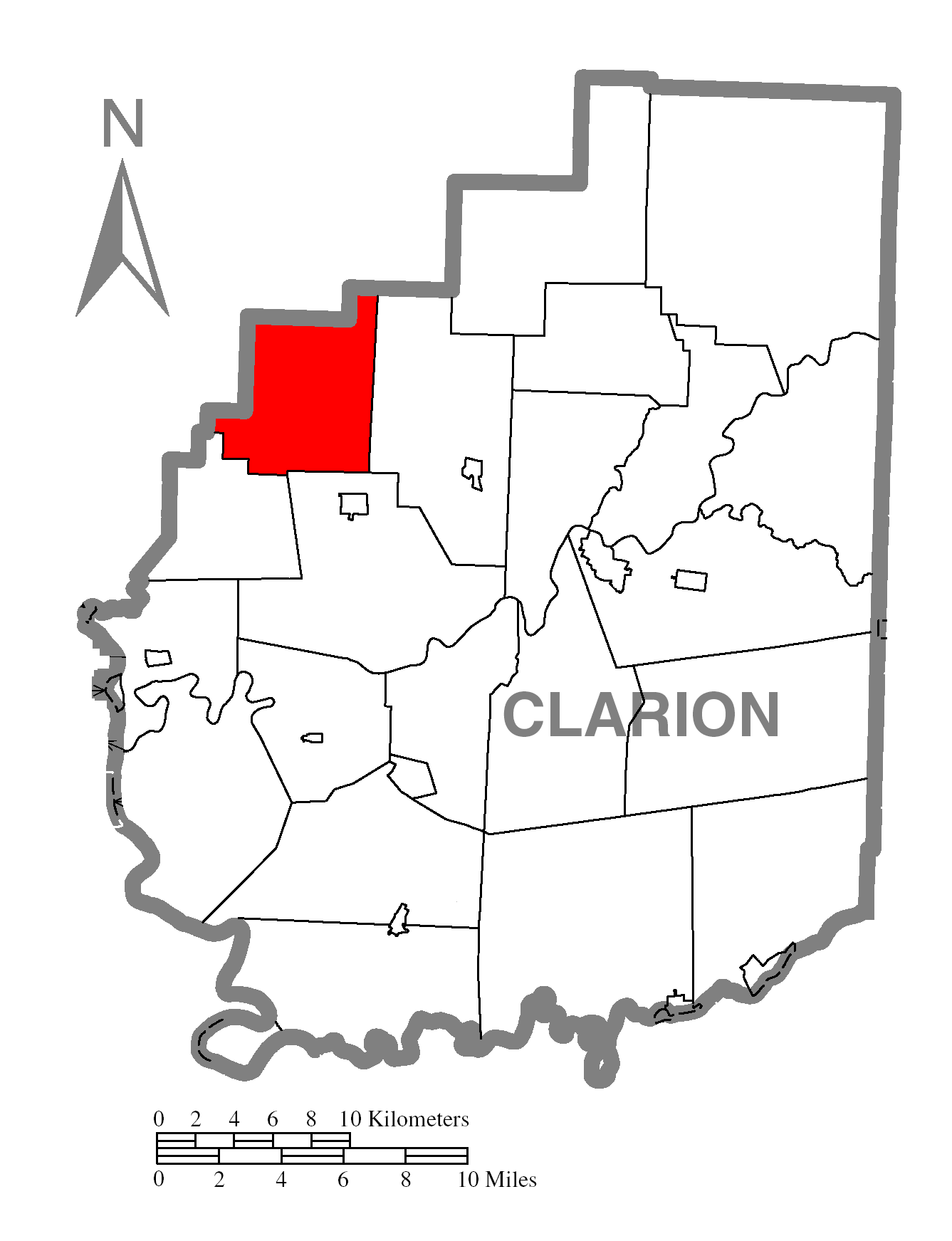
- Map of Clarion County, highlighting Ashland Township

- Map of Clarion County, Pennsylvania
- Country: United States
- State: Pennsylvania
- County: Clarion
- Settled: 1804
- Incorporated: 1856

Area
  - Total: 22.53 sq mi (58.34 km^{2})
  - Land: 22.43 sq mi (58.10 km^{2})
  - Water: 0.089 sq mi (0.23 km^{2})

Population (2020)
  - Total: 1,116 ▲
  - Estimate (2023): 1,094
  - Density: 49.75/sq mi (19.21/km^{2})
- Time zone: UTC-5 (Eastern (EST))
  - Summer (DST): UTC-4 (EDT)
- FIPS code: 42-031-03248

There is also the Borough of Ashland in Schuylkill and Columbia Counties.

Ashland Township is a township in Clarion County, Pennsylvania, United States. The population was 1,116 at the 2020 census, an increase from the figure of 1,114 tabulated in 2010.

== Geography ==
The township is in northwestern Clarion County and is bordered by Venango County to the northwest. According to the United States Census Bureau, the township has a total area of 22.5 square miles (58.3 km^{2}), of which 22.4 square miles (58.1 km^{2}) is land and 0.08 square miles (0.2 km^{2}), or 0.40%, is water.

== Demographics ==
Historical population
Census	Pop.	Note	%±
2000	1,081		—
2010	1,114		3.1%
2020	1,116		0.2%
2023 (est.)	1,094		−2.0%
U.S. Decennial Census

As of the census of 2000, there were 1,081 people, 394 households, and 319 families residing in the township. The population density was 47.9 inhabitants per square mile (18.5/km^{2}). There were 434 housing units at an average density of 19.2/sq mi (7.4/km^{2}). The racial makeup of the township was 97.69% White, 0.83% Asian, 0.28% from other races, and 1.20% from two or more races. Hispanic or Latino of any race were 0.09% of the population.

There were 394 households, out of which 36.5% had children under the age of 18 living with them, 71.1% were married couples living together, 5.6% had a female householder with no husband present, and 18.8% were non-families. 16.8% of all households were made up of individuals, and 7.6% had someone living alone who was 65 years of age or older. The average household size was 2.74 and the average family size was 3.07.

In the township the population was spread out, with 27.5% under the age of 18, 6.9% from 18 to 24, 26.9% from 25 to 44, 23.8% from 45 to 64, and 14.9% who were 65 years of age or older. The median age was 37 years. For every 100 females, there were 105.9 males. For every 100 females age 18 and over, there were 101.5 males.

The median income for a household in the township was $37,065, and the median income for a family was $42,875. Males had a median income of $29,875 versus $21,818 for females. The per capita income for the township was $15,457. About 4.9% of families and 6.7% of the population were below the poverty line, including 12.4% of those under age 18 and 3.8% of those age 65 or over.
