= Pennsylvania Route 18 =

State highway in Pennsylvania, US

Pennsylvania Route 18
- Route of PA 18 highlighted in red

Route information
- Maintained by PennDOT
- Length: 205 mi (330 km)
- Tourist routes: Crawford Lakelands Scenic Byway

Major junctions
- South end: WV 69 at the West Virginia state line near New Freeport
- US 40 in Washington; I-70 near Washington; US 22 near Frankfort Springs; US 30 near Harshaville; I-376 near Monaca; I-76 / Penna Turnpike in Big Beaver; I-376 near West Middlesex; I-80 / I-376 / PA 760 near West Middlesex; I-90 near Platea; US 20 near Girard
- North end: PA 5 in Lake City

Location
- Country: United States
- State: Pennsylvania
- Counties: Greene, Washington, Beaver, Lawrence, Mercer, Crawford, Erie

Highway system
- Pennsylvania State Route System; Interstate; US; State; Scenic; Legislative
← PA 17	→ US 19

Pennsylvania Route 18 (PA 18) is a major north–south highway in Western Pennsylvania whose southern terminus is at the West Virginia state line, where it continues as WV 69, while the northern terminus is at PA 5 in Lake City. At a length of 205 miles (330 km), PA 18 is the only state route in Pennsylvania — north–south or east–west — to traverse the entire state. It also has the distinction of being the longest state route in Pennsylvania.

== Route description ==
=== Greene County ===
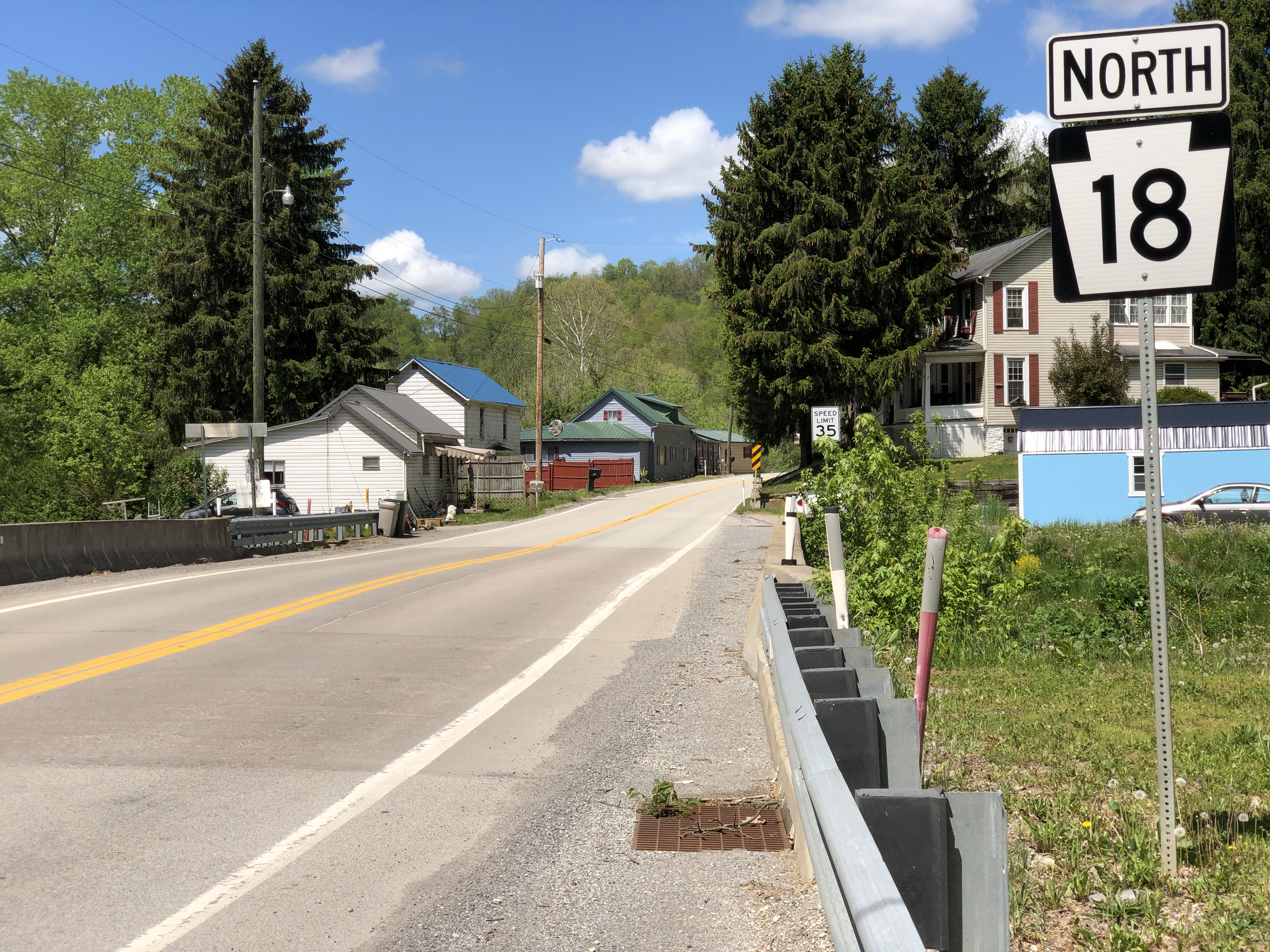
PA 18 northbound in Sycamore

Traveling northward from West Virginia Route 69 at the West Virginia state line, Route 18 winds through rural Greene County, passing through the villages of Garrison, New Freeport, Nettle Hill, White Cottage, Woodruff, and Holbrook, before making its first junction with another state highway, PA Route 21, just west of the village of Rogersville and over 15 miles (24 km) from the state line. Here the two routes overlap for nearly 6 miles (9.7 km), winding east-northeast through Rogersville and the village of East View, crossing the South Fork of Ten Mile Creek numerous times before reaching the village of West Waynesburg. At this point, Route 18 leaves the concurrency and turns northwest, traveling 12 miles (19 km) to the county line, following along Browns Creek, and passing through the villages of Rees Mill, Sycamore, and Nineveh.

=== Washington County ===
Route 18 enters Washington County, and intersects with the eastern terminus of PA Route 231 and turns to the northeast and traveling over 5 miles (8.0 km), passing near the villages of Old Concord and Sparta. Next, the route meets PA Route 221, and the two overlap for just over a mile, heading northwest through the village of Prosperity. After the village, Route 18 leaves the concurrency and heads northward through the villages of Van Buren, Lagonda, and Gabby Heights as it approaches the city of Washington nearly 10 miles (16 km) later. In Washington, Route 18 briefly overlaps with US 40, and the routes head west, intersect with the western terminus of PA Route 136, and then turn northwest. US 40 then leaves the concurrency, and nearly a mile later, Route 18 interchanges with I-70, connecting via city streets to the entrance and exit ramps. Before departing the city, 0.4 miles (0.64 km) later, the route intersects with the eastern terminus of PA Route 844, turns northward, and passes through the village of Oak Grove. Route 18 passes through the village of Gretna 8.5 miles (13.7 km) later and then overlaps with PA Route 50 for 0.5 miles (0.80 km) a couple miles west of the village of Hickory before continuing north-northwest. The route then passes by the village of Atlasburg and through the village of Slovan before reaching the borough of Burgettstown 7.5 miles (12.1 km) later. Route 18 meets US 22 nearly 4 miles (6.4 km) north of the borough, and then passes through the village of Florence at Old US 22 before reaching the county line just over 3 miles (4.8 km) later.

=== Beaver County ===
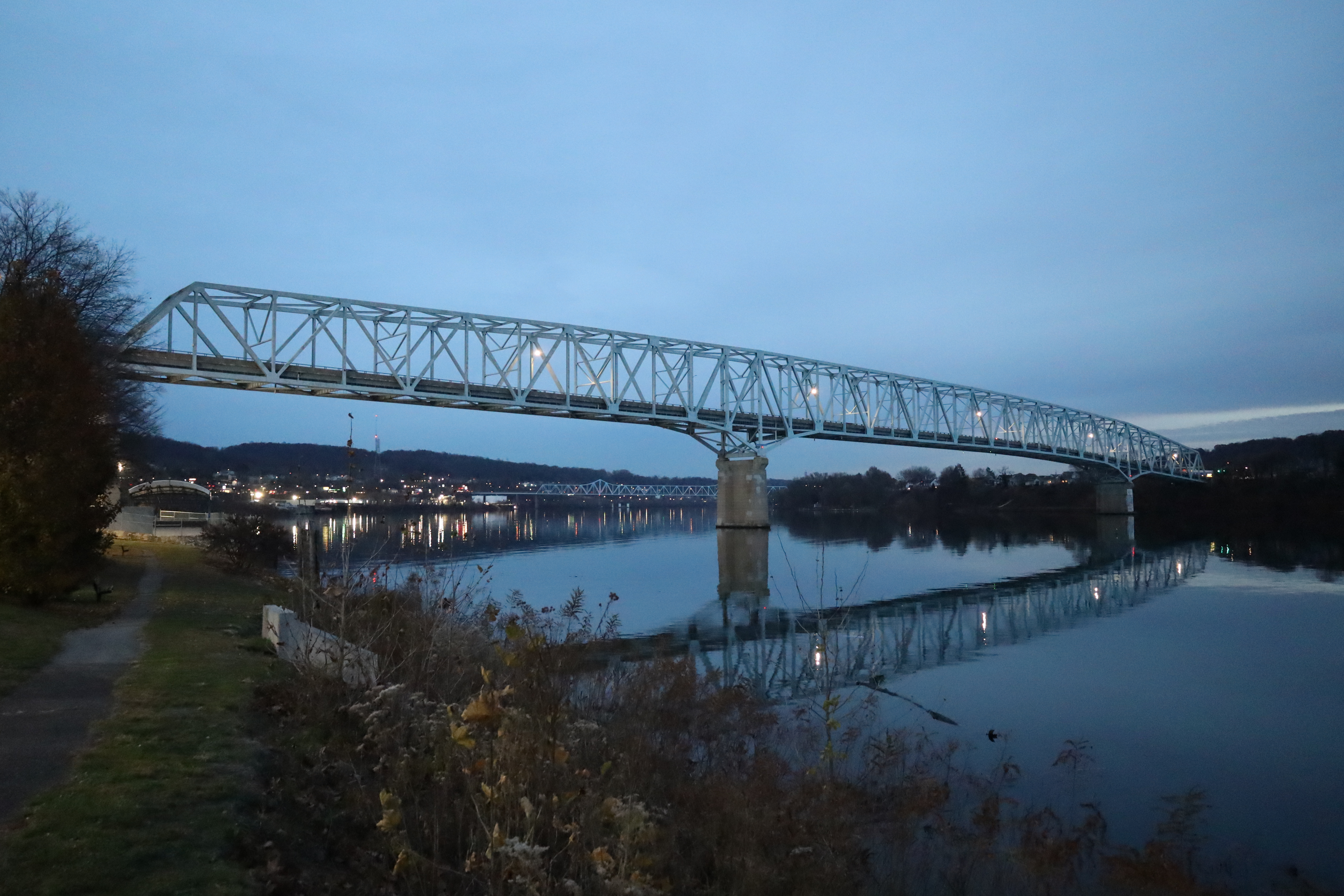
PA 18 crosses the Ohio River on the Rochester–Monaca Bridge, pictured in 2025

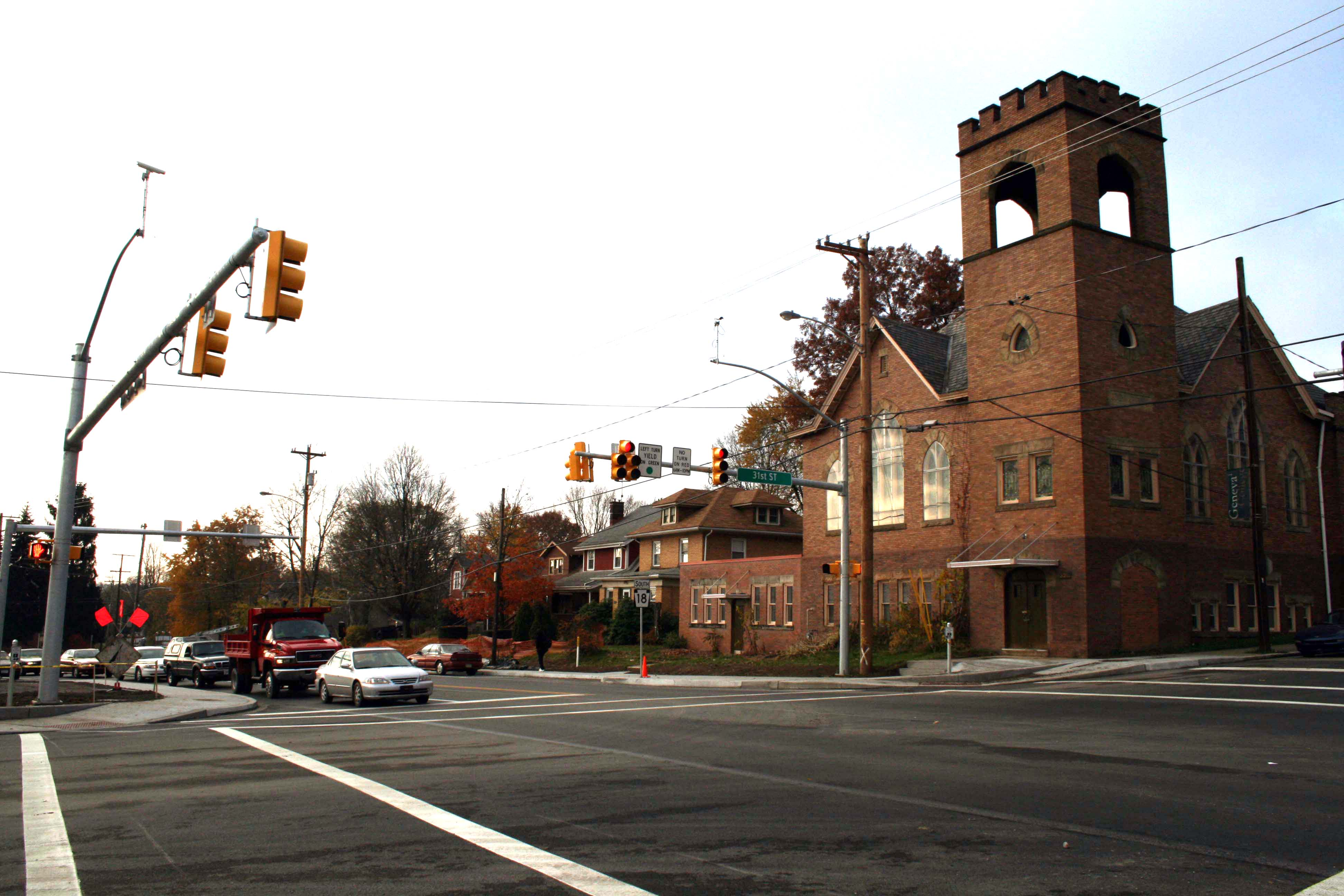
PA 18 was rerouted around the campus of Geneva College in Beaver Falls in 2008. Shown is the intersection constructed in front of the campus.

The route enters the borough of Frankfort Springs as it enters Beaver County, and meets the southern terminus of PA Route 168 at the north end of the borough. Passing through nearly 5 miles (8.0 km) of state park land, Route 18 eventually meets US 30 in the village of Harshaville. The route then junctions with PA Route 151 at the village of Mechanicsburg about 1.5 miles (2.4 km) later, and then passes through the village of McCleary. As Route 18 approaches the Ohio River, it turns east-northeast before its first interchange with I-376 about 2 miles (3.2 km) west of the borough of Monaca. The route enters the borough, turns north-northwest, crosses the Ohio River on the Rochester–Monaca Bridge, and enters the borough of Rochester.

In Rochester, Route 18 intersects with the PA Route 51/PA Route 65 overlap, and then PA Route 68 before turning northwest, west, then north-northwest. It then merges with PA Route 65 along the east bank of the Beaver River. The concurrency enters the borough of New Brighton, where Route 18 then leaves the concurrency over 2 miles (3.2 km) later, crosses the Beaver River, enters the city of Beaver Falls, and continues northward almost 2 miles (3.2 km). Route 18 briefly joins with PA Route 588, and then intersects with the southern terminus of PA Route 551 2 miles (3.2 km) later, just before leaving the city and entering the borough of Big Beaver. The route then passes through the borough of Homewood about 1.5 miles (2.4 km) later, and re-enters Big Beaver, where it interchanges with I-76 and The Pennsylvania Turnpike. Route 18 then passes through the borough of Koppel nearly 1.5 miles (2.4 km) later, where it intersects with PA Route 351, and then re-enters Big Beaver a third time before leaving Beaver County 1.3 miles (2.1 km) later.

=== Lawrence County ===
As the route enters Lawrence County, it also enters the borough of New Beaver. Route 18 then turns northwestward, and passes through the borough of Wampum 2 miles (3.2 km) later, where it intersects with the western terminus of PA Route 288. The route re-enters New Beaver, then turns northward before its second intersection with PA Route 168 over 3.5 miles (5.6 km) later, near the village of Moravia. Route 18 enters the city of New Castle nearly 4 miles (6.4 km) later as it crosses the Mahoning River, and then meets PA Route 108. The two join and turn east, then northeast through the village of Mahoningtown, situated between the Mahoning and Shenango rivers. The concurrency then passes under US 422 about 0.8 miles (1.3 km) later before turning eastward and crossing the Shenango River. The concurrency then intersects 1.3 miles (2.1 km) later with PA Route 168, and the three routes overlap for 0.9 miles (1.4 km), heading northward. Routes 108 and 168 then leave the concurrency, and Route 18 continues northward. The route is then joined with Business US 422 near downtown New Castle for nearly 0.5 miles (0.80 km). Business US 422 then leaves westward and Route 18 continues northward out of the city. Route 18 passes through the village of Walmo, and then intersects 4 miles (6.4 km) north of New Castle with Mitchell Rd., which carries traffic to I-376 parallel to and west of Route 18. From here, PA 18 heads into a rural area of northern Lawrence County that is home to an Amish community. Over 1.6 miles (2.6 km) later, the route intersects with the southern terminus of PA 158 south of the borough of New Wilmington, and 2.3 miles (3.7 km) later with PA 208 west of the borough just before exiting Lawrence County 0.5 miles (0.80 km) north of the intersection.

=== Mercer County ===
Upon entering Mercer County, the route winds northwesterly a few miles before turning west, where it has its second interchange with I-376 4.5 miles (7.2 km) later. Route 18 then turns northwesterly again, intersecting with the northern terminus of PA Route 551 0.4 miles (0.64 km) later, and enters the borough of West Middlesex a mile after that. Here, the route intersects with PA Route 318. Turning northward, the route then passes under I-80 and has an interchange with PA Route 760 immediately after (Route 18 traffic interchanges with I-80 via this PA Route 760 interchange). Route 18 then enters the city of Hermitage, intersects with the southern terminus of PA Route 518 a mile north of PA Route 760 at the village of Bobby's Corners, and continues about 2 miles (3.2 km) before intersecting with US 62 and then Business US 62 less than 0.3 miles (0.48 km) later. Over 1.5 miles (2.4 km) after that, the route intersects with the northern terminus of PA Route 518 at the village of Lamont's Corners east of the borough of Sharpsville before leaving Hermitage. The route enters the borough of Clark about 2.2 miles (3.5 km) later, where it intersects with the northern terminus of PA Route 258. Route 18 then crosses the Shenango River Reservoir, then passes near the villages of Transfer, Reynolds Heights, and Shenango before entering the borough of Greenville 8 miles (13 km) north of Clark. In Greenville, Route 18 intersects with the northern terminus of PA Route 846 just before its junction with PA Route 358. Here, the two routes overlap, heading eastward, and cross the Shenango River once again, before intersecting about 0.5 miles (0.80 km) later with PA Route 58, which joins the concurrency for about a quarter mile. Routes 18 and 58 then leave Route 358 and head northward. Less than a half mile later, Route 18 leaves the concurrency, turning northeastward, then northward, leaving Greenville. The Route continues through rural northern Mercer County about 4.5 miles (7.2 km) before passing through the village of Osgood, and leaves Mercer County less than a mile later.

=== Crawford County ===
After entering Crawford County, Route 18 then passes through the village of Adamsville about 2 miles (3.2 km) north of the county line, and, over 2.5 miles (4.0 km) later, enters the village of Hartstown, where it joins US 322, heading east-northeast. They travel over 5 miles (8.0 km) to the borough of Conneaut Lake, where they serve Conneaut Lake Park and join with US 6/PA Route 285, heading east. Route 285 leaves the concurrency one block later, and the remaining routes continue eastward out of the borough, nearly a mile later, where Route 18 then leaves the concurrency and heads northward. About 3.5 miles (5.6 km) north of the borough, Route 18 intersects with the northern terminus of PA Route 618 near Conneaut Lake Park, and then passes through the village of Harmonsburg. About 7.5 miles (12.1 km) later, the route is joined by PA Route 198, and the concurrency enters the borough of Conneautville. In the borough, Route 198 leaves the concurrency nearly 0.9 miles (1.4 km) later, and Route 18 continues northward, passing through the borough of Springboro just over 3 miles (4.8 km) north of Conneautville.

=== Erie County ===
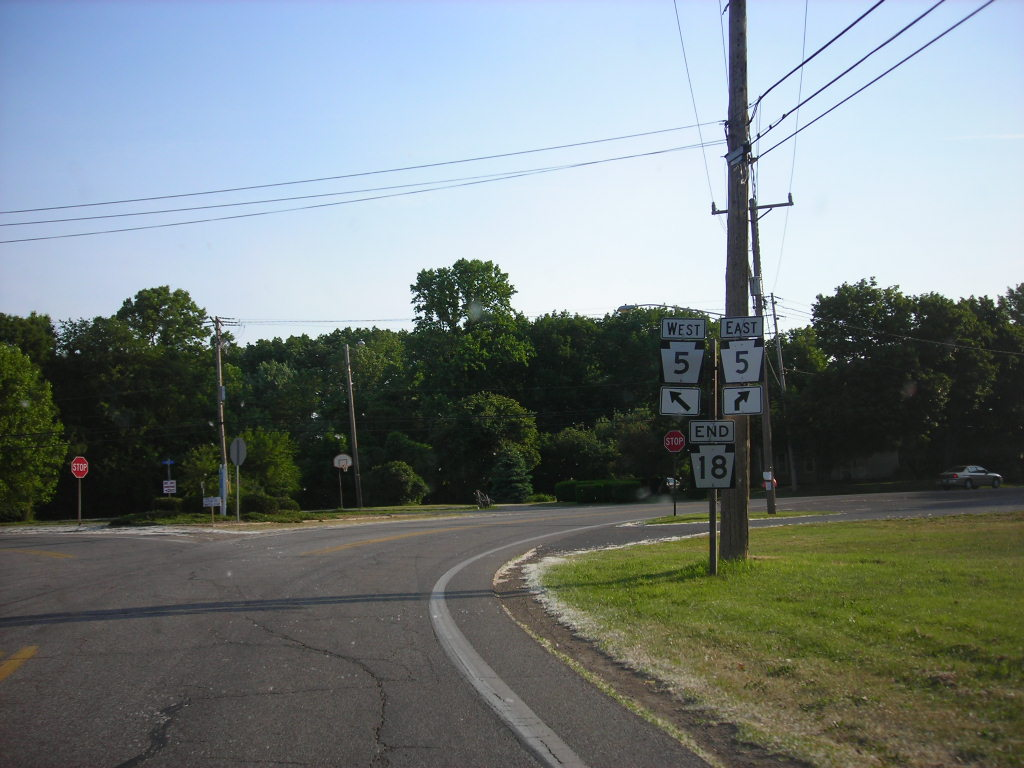
Northern terminus of PA 18 at PA 5 in Lake City

Over 3.5 miles (5.6 km) north of Springboro, the route crosses into Erie County, and enters the borough of Albion nearly 3 miles (4.8 km) later. Here, Route 18 joins US 6N eastward about 1.5 miles (2.4 km), leaving the borough, where Route 18 turns northward. A mile later, the route passes through the borough of Cranesville, and then enters the borough of Platea about 3 miles (4.8 km) later, where it interchanges with I-90. Just over 2 miles (3.2 km) northward, Route 18 joins US 20 eastward into the borough of Girard for 1-mile (1.6 km), before leaving the concurrency and turning northward. Upon exiting Girard, the route enters the borough of Lake City, where it terminates at PA Route 5 near the shore of Lake Erie.

== History ==
In 1927, the route was signed from Beaver Falls to Erie. The following year, it was extended south from Beaver Falls to the West Virginia state line and moved to its current alignment between PA 158 and Greenville from its previous alignment on current-day PA 158 near New Wilmington to Mercer and PA 58 from Mercer to Greenville.

In 1963, the route was moved from Liberty Street, Atlantic Avenue, and Washington Street in New Castle to its current alignment on Mahoning Avenue and Jefferson Street. Seven years later, the route was widened from PA 518 in Hermitage (north end near Sharpsville) to Clark, and median installed; also, designation moved to the Beaver Valley Expressway (now Interstate 376 and PA 760) expressway between the West Middlesex interchange and the end of the Beaver Valley Expressway. In 1971, the route was widened and had a median installed from US 62 north to Highland Rd. in Hermitage (then Hickory Township). The following year, widening completed from Clark to Shenango (village, near Greenville). Six years later, designation moved back to the current alignment from the Beaver Valley Expressway designation of 1970, and Business PA 18 designation through West Middlesex was eliminated.

In 1997, the road was widened to five lanes from the north Beaver Valley Expressway interchange near West Middlesex to US 62 in Hermitage. Five years later, widening was completed from US 62 in Hermitage to PA 518 near Sharpsville. Six years following, the route was rerouted away from Geneva College in Beaver Falls to make the campus more safe for students. In 2016, the route was rerouted in Potter Township for both infrastructure improvements and widening in response to the Pennsylvania Shell ethylene cracker plant, with Royal Dutch Shell paying for the realignment.

== Major intersections ==
County	Location	mi	km	Destinations	Notes
Greene	Freeport Township	0.0	0.0	WV 69 south – Hundred	Continuation into West Virginia
Greene	Center Township	15.7	25.3	PA 21 west (Roy E. Furman Highway) – Rutan	Southern end of PA 21 concurrency
Greene	Franklin Township	21.5	34.6	PA 21 east (Main Street) – Waynesburg	Northern end of PA 21 concurrency
Washington	East Finley Township	33.6	54.1	PA 231 north (East Finley Drive)	Southern terminus of PA 231
Washington	Morris Township	38.9	62.6	PA 221 south (Plum Sock Road)	Southern end of PA 221 concurrency
Washington	Morris Township	40.1	64.5	PA 221 north (South Bridge Road) – Taylorstown	Northern end of PA 221 concurrency
Washington	Washington	50.0	80.5	US 40 east (East Maiden Street)	Southern end of US 40 concurrency
Washington	Washington	50.1	80.6	PA 136 east (Beau Street)	Western terminus of PA 136
Washington	Washington	50.6	81.4	US 40 west (West Chestnut Street)	Northern end of US 40 concurrency
Washington	Washington	51.5	82.9	I-70 to I-79 – Wheeling, New Stanton	Exit 17 on I-70
Washington	Washington	51.9	83.5	PA 844 west (Jefferson Avenue)	Eastern terminus of PA 844
Washington	Mount Pleasant Township	60.4	97.2	PA 50 west (Avella Road) – Avella	Southern end of PA 50 concurrency
Washington	Mount Pleasant Township	60.9	98.0	PA 50 east (Main Street) – Hickory	Northern end of PA 50 concurrency
Washington	Hanover Township	72.3	116.4	US 22 – Weirton, Pittsburgh	Interchange
Beaver	Frankfort Springs	76.5	123.1	PA 168 north	Southern terminus of PA 168
Beaver	Hanover Township	81.4	131.0	US 30 (Lincoln Highway)	
Beaver	Raccoon Township	82.9	133.4	PA 151 (Bocktown Road)	
Beaver	Center Township	93.3	150.2	I-376 – Pittsburgh, Pittsburgh International Airport, Beaver, New Castle	Exit 39 on I-376; former PA 60
Beaver	Ohio River	96.6	155.5	Monaca-Rochester Bridge	
Beaver	Rochester	96.8	155.8	PA 51 / PA 65	Interchange
Beaver	Rochester	97.0	156.1	PA 68 (Adams Street) to PA 51 north	Roundabout
Beaver	Rochester Township	97.8	157.4	PA 65 south	Southbound exit and northbound entrance; southern end of PA 65 concurrency
Beaver	New Brighton	100.1	161.1	PA 65 north (5th Street) – Ellwood City	Northern end of PA 65 concurrency
Beaver	Beaver Falls	101.9	164.0	PA 588 west (24th Street)	Southern end of PA 588 concurrency
Beaver	Beaver Falls	101.9	164.0	PA 588 east (Eastvale Bridge)	Northern end of PA 588 concurrency
Beaver	Beaver Falls			PA 251 west (37th Street)	Eastern terminus of PA 251
Beaver	Beaver Falls	103.9	167.2	PA 551 north (Wallace Run Road) to I-376	Southern terminus of PA 551
Beaver	Big Beaver	105.8	170.3	I-76 / Penna Turnpike – Pittsburgh, Ohio	Exit 13 on I-76 / Turnpike
Beaver	Koppel	107.3	172.7	PA 351 (Arthur Street) to I-376 – New Galilee, Ellwood City	
Lawrence	Wampum	110.6	178.0	PA 288 east (Main Street) – Wampum, Ellwood City	Western terminus of PA 288
Lawrence	North Beaver Township	114.3	183.9	PA 168 (Galilee Road / Wampum Road) to I-376 – West Pittsburg	
Lawrence	New Castle	117.8	189.6	PA 108 west (Mount Jackson Road) to I-376 – Mount Jackson	Southern end of PA 108 concurrency
Lawrence	New Castle	119.9	193.0	PA 168 south (Moravia Street) to US 422	Southern end of PA 168 concurrency
Lawrence	New Castle	120.8	194.4	PA 108 east / PA 168 north (South Croton Avenue) to PA 65	Northern end of PA 108/PA 168 concurrency
Lawrence	New Castle	120.9	194.6	US 422 Bus. east (Grove Street)	Southern end of US 422 Bus. concurrency
Lawrence	New Castle	121.2	195.1	US 224 west / US 422 Bus. west (West Falls Street)	Northern end of US 422 Bus. concurrency; eastern terminus of US 224
Lawrence	Neshannock Township	125.7	202.3	To I-376	Access via Mitchell Road
Lawrence	Wilmington Township	127.3	204.9	PA 158 north – Mercer	Southern terminus of PA 158
Lawrence	Wilmington Township	129.6	208.6	PA 208 – Pulaski, New Wilmington, Volant	
Mercer	Shenango Township	134.7	216.8	I-376 – New Castle, Sharon	Exit 2 on I-376; former PA 60
Mercer	Shenango Township	135.1	217.4	PA 551 south (Pulaski Road) – Pulaski	Northern terminus of PA 551
Mercer	West Middlesex	136.2	219.2	PA 318 (Main Street)	
Mercer	Shenango Township	137.1	220.6	PA 760 to I-80 / I-376 east – Wheatland, Farrell, Sharon, New Castle	Interchange; former PA 60
Mercer	Hermitage	138.1	222.3	PA 518 north (Longview Road) – Farrell, Wheatland	Southern terminus of PA 518
Mercer	Hermitage	140.1	225.5	US 62 (Shenango Valley Freeway) – Sharon, Mercer	
Mercer	Hermitage	140.4	226.0	US 62 Bus. (East State Street) – Sharon, Mercer	
Mercer	Hermitage	142.0	228.5	PA 518 south (Lamor Road) – Sharpsville	Northern terminus of PA 518
Mercer	Clark	144.2	232.1	PA 258 south – Clark, Mercer	Northern terminus of PA 258
Mercer	Greenville	152.8	245.9	PA 846 south (Orangeville Street) – Orangeville	Northern terminus of PA 846
Mercer	Greenville	152.9	246.1	PA 358 west (West Main Street)	Southern end of PA 358 concurrency
Mercer	Greenville	153.4	246.9	PA 58 east (South Mercer Street)	Southern end of PA 58 concurrency
Mercer	Greenville	153.6	247.2	PA 358 east (Main Street)	Northern end of PA 358 concurrency
Mercer	Hempfield Township	154.0	247.8	PA 58 west (East Jamestown Road) – Jamestown	Northern end of PA 58 concurrency
Crawford	West Fallowfield Township	164.1	264.1	US 322 west (Liberty Street) – Jamestown	Southern end of US 322 concurrency
Crawford	Conneaut Lake	169.4	272.6	US 6 west / PA 285 west (Water Street)	Southern end of US 6/PA 285 concurrency
Crawford	Conneaut Lake	169.5	272.8	PA 285 east (3rd Street)	Northern end of PA 285 concurrency
Crawford	Sadsbury Township	170.4	274.2	US 6 east / US 322 east (Conneaut Lake Road)	Northern end of US 6/US 322 concurrency
Crawford	Summit Township	173.9	279.9	PA 618 south	Northern terminus of PA 618
Crawford	Summerhill Township	181.5	292.1	PA 198 east – Saegertown	Southern end of PA 198 concurrency
Crawford	Conneautville	182.3	293.4	PA 198 west (Mulberry Street) – Linesville	Northern end of PA 198 concurrency
Erie	Albion	192.0	309.0	US 6N west (West State Street) – West Springfield	Southern end of US 6N concurrency
Erie	Elk Creek Township	193.6	311.6	US 6N east – Edinboro	Northern end of US 6N concurrency
Erie	Girard Township	199.2	320.6	I-90 – Cleveland, Erie	Exit 9 on I-90
Erie	Girard Township	201.4	324.1	US 20 west (Ridge Road) – Cleveland	Southern end of US 20 concurrency
Erie	Girard	202.4	325.7	US 20 east (West Main Street) – Erie	Northern end of US 20 concurrency
Erie	Lake City	205.0	329.9	PA 5 (West Lake Road)	Northern terminus
1.000 mi = 1.609 km; 1.000 km = 0.621 mi: Concurrency terminus

== Special routes ==
=== PA 18 Truck (Washington) ===
Pennsylvania Route 18 Truck
- Location: Washington, Pennsylvania

Pennsylvania Route 18 Truck is a truck route of PA 18 that is located near Washington, Pennsylvania.

The westbound exits and entrances of I-70 lead to a narrow street (called East Wylie Avenue) connecting to PA 18, thus making it harder for trucks to access PA 18. So, it follows I-70 west. It exits at exit 16, following Sheffield Street. Then, it creates a U-Turn back onto I-70 east and exits off PA 18.

=== PA 18 Truck (New Castle) ===
Pennsylvania Route 18 Truck
- Location: New Castle, Pennsylvania
- Existed: 2013–2018

Pennsylvania Route 18 Truck was a truck route around a weight-restricted bridge over the Shenango River that existed from 2013 to about 2018. The bridge along Mahoning Avenue was prohibited to trucks over 30 tons, necessitating the route. The route followed PA 108, I-376, US 422, and PA 168. In 2018, the bridge underwent rehabilitation, including the replacement of bearings, and substructure and steel repairs, among other fixes. As a result, the route was deleted upon reconstruction.

=== PA 18 Business (West Middlesex) ===
Pennsylvania Route 18 Business
- Location: West Middlesex, Pennsylvania
- Existed: 1970–1978

Pennsylvania Route 18 Business was a business route of PA 18 that was established in 1970 when PA 18 was shifted onto the a part of the Beaver Valley Expressway from Exit 2 (PA 18) to the PA 760/PA 18 interchange near West Middlesex, Pennsylvania. PA 18 Business followed New Castle Road and Sharon Road through the town of West Middlesex. The route was removed in 1978 when mainline PA 18 was rerouted on its old alignment, removing the need for the business route.
