= Pennsylvania Route 956 =

State highway in Lawrence County, Pennsylvania, US

Pennsylvania Route 956

Route information
- Maintained by PennDOT
- Length: 10.986 mi (17.680 km)

Major junctions
- South end: US 19 in Scott Township
- North end: PA 158 / PA 208 in New Wilmington

Location
- Country: United States
- State: Pennsylvania
- Counties: Lawrence

Highway system
- Pennsylvania State Route System; Interstate; US; State; Scenic; Legislative
← PA 955	→ PA 957

Pennsylvania Route 956 (PA 956) is a 10.98-mile-long (17.67 km) state highway located in Lawrence County in Pennsylvania. The southern terminus is at U.S. Route 19 (US 19) in Scott Township. The northern terminus is at PA 208 in New Wilmington. The route has followed its current alignment since 1932 and has been fully paved since 1940.

== Route description ==
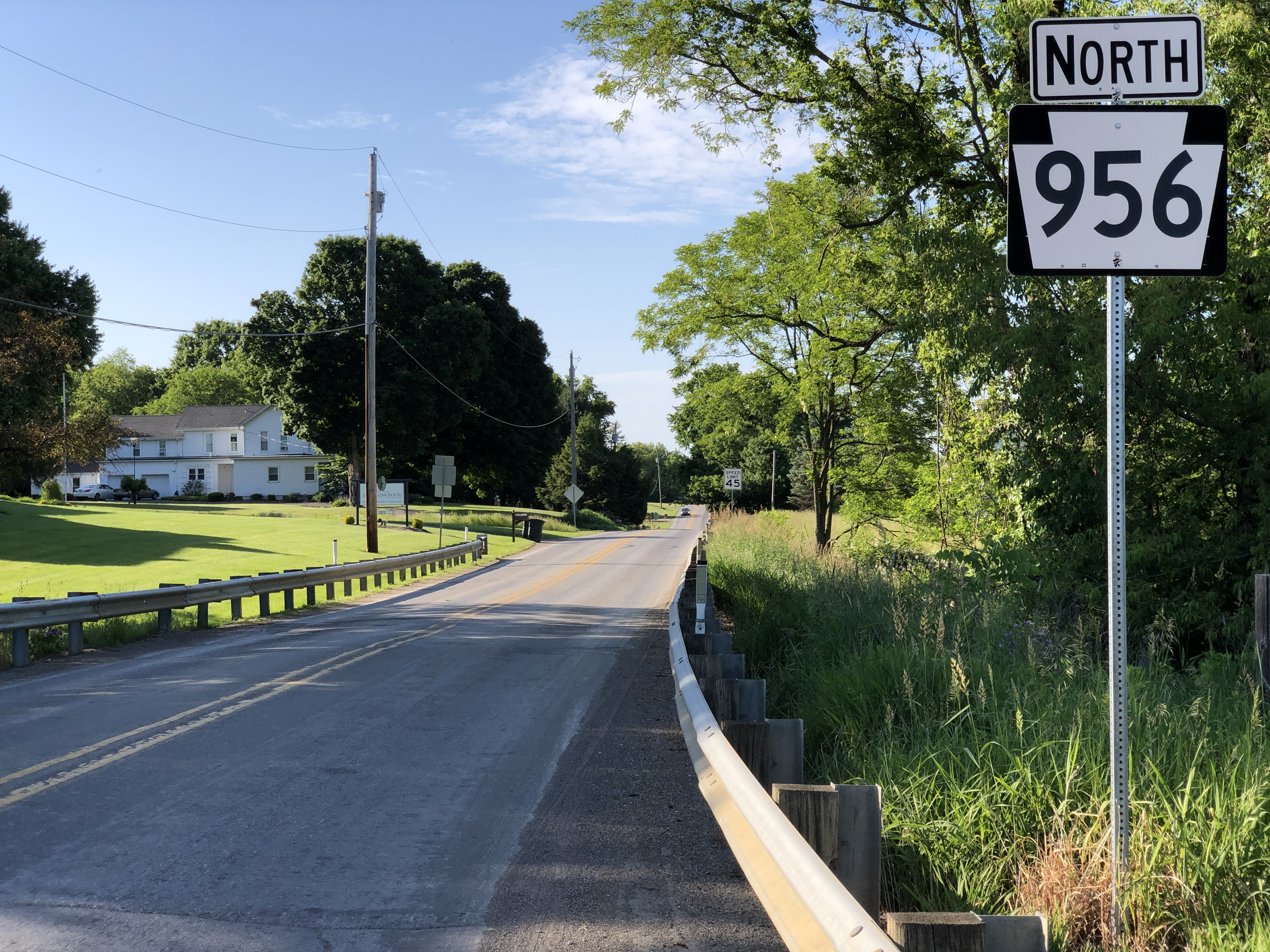
PA 956 northbound in Wilmington Township

PA 956 begins at an intersection with US 19 in Scott Township, heading to the west on a two-lane undivided road. The route passes through a mix of farmland and woodland with some homes, turning to the northwest. The road continues through more rural areas, crossing into Washington Township. Farther northwest, PA 956 heads into Hickory Township and reaches an intersection with PA 168. After this junction, the route heads into a rural area of northern Lawrence County that is home to an Amish community and enters Wilmington Township, where it turns more to the west as it crosses the Neshannock Creek. The road continues along the northern bank of the creek, heading southwest through rural residential areas before bending northwest in the community of Neshannock Falls. PA 956 crosses the Little Neshannock Creek and continues through farms and woods with some homes, curving west before making a turn to the north. The road continues through rural areas before coming into the borough of New Wilmington, where it becomes South Market Street. Here, the route passes to the west of Westminster College before heading into the commercial downtown. PA 956 reaches its northern terminus at an intersection with PA 158 and PA 208, where the road continues north as part of PA 158.

== Major intersections ==
The entire route is in Lawrence County.

Location	mi	km	Destinations	Notes
Scott Township	0.000	0.000	US 19 (Perry Highway)	Southern terminus
Hickory Township	4.732	7.615	PA 168 (Eastbrook Volant Road) – New Castle, Volant	
New Wilmington	10.986	17.680	PA 158 / PA 208 (North Market Street / Neshannock Avenue) – Mercer, Pulaski, Volant	Northern terminus
1.000 mi = 1.609 km; 1.000 km = 0.621 mi

== PA 956 Truck ==
Pennsylvania Route 956 Truck
- Location: Wilmington Township, Pennsylvania
- Existed: 2013–2019

Pennsylvania Route 956 Truck was a truck route around a weight-restricted bridge over the Neshannock Creek in Wilmington Township, Lawrence County, Pennsylvania. The route followed PA 208 and PA 168. It was signed in 2013. The route was decommissioned before 2019 following a bridge repair.
