= Pennsylvania Route 258 =

State highway in Pennsylvania, US

Pennsylvania Route 258

Route information
- Maintained by PennDOT
- Length: 26.9 mi (43.3 km)

Major junctions
- South end: PA 108 / PA 173 in Slippery Rock
- PA 208 in Springfield Township; I-79 in Springfield Township; US 19 / US 62 / PA 58 in Mercer; PA 158 in Mercer
- North end: PA 18 in Clark

Location
- Country: United States
- State: Pennsylvania
- Counties: Butler, Mercer

Highway system
- Pennsylvania State Route System; Interstate; US; State; Scenic; Legislative
← PA 257	→ PA 259

Pennsylvania Route 258 (PA 258) is a 27-mile-long (43 km) state highway located in Butler and Mercer counties in Pennsylvania. The southern terminus is at PA 108/PA 173 in Slippery Rock. The northern terminus is at PA 18 in Clark.

== Route description ==
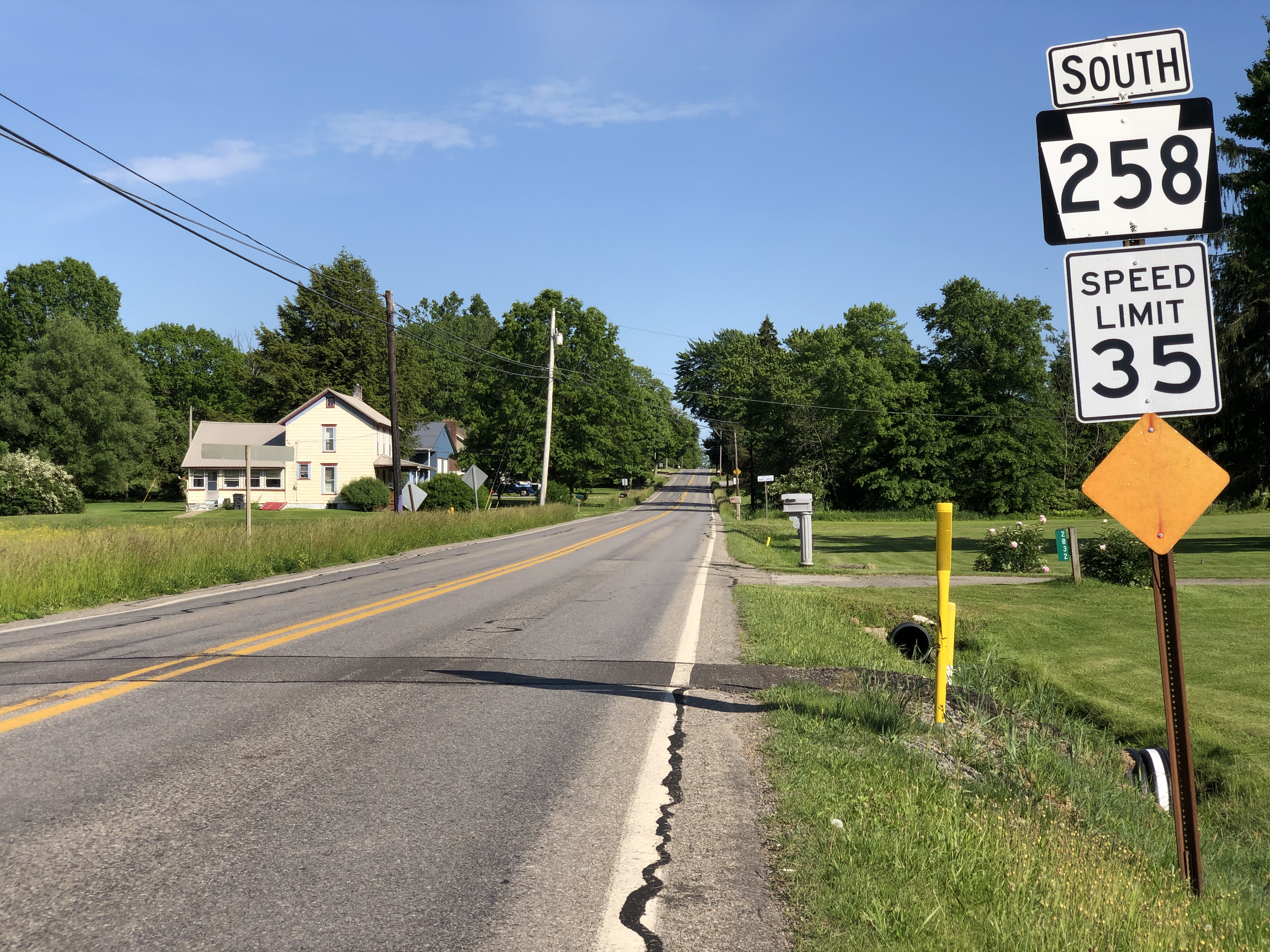
PA 258 southbound in Liberty Township

PA 258 begins at an intersection with PA 108 and PA 173 in the borough of Slippery Rock in Butler County, heading northwest on two-lane undivided North Main Street. The road continues southeast from this point as a part of PA 173. From the southern terminus, the route heads past a few businesses before heading into residential areas. PA 258 runs through less dense areas of housing before crossing into Slippery Rock Township and becoming Mercer Road. The road continues into agricultural areas with some woods and homes, crossing Wolf Creek and passing near Christleys Mills.

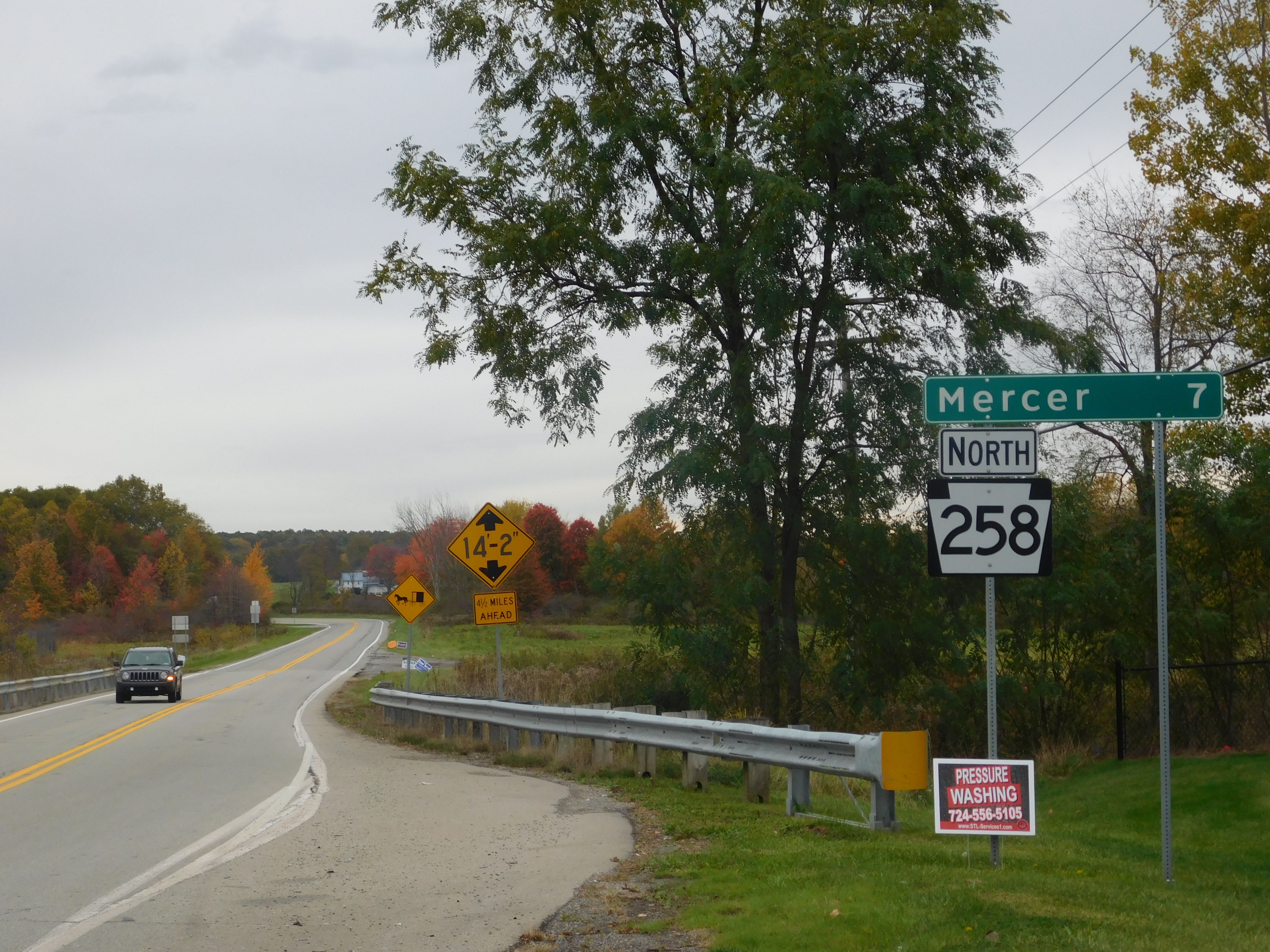
PA 258 north in Springfield Township

PA 258 enters Liberty Township in Mercer County and becomes Mercer Butler Pike, running through farmland and woodland with some residences and passing through North Liberty. The road continues through more rural areas, passing through Valcourt and Amsterdam. The route heads into Springfield Township and comes to an intersection with PA 208 in London. At this point, PA 258 turns west to form a concurrency with PA 208 on South Center Street Extended, a five-lane road with a center left-turn lane. The road heads through business areas and comes to an interchange with I-79, at which point it becomes Leesburg Grove City Road. A short distance past the interchange, PA 258 splits from PA 208 north of the Grove City Premium Outlets by turning north onto two-lane undivided Butler Pike, turning east past more commercial establishments. The road turns north into wooded areas and runs a short distance to the west of I-79 before curving northwest. The route heads through more wooded areas with some farm fields and homes, passing through Blacktown before heading into Findley Township. PA 258 continues through more rural areas with some residences, passing under I-80. The road runs through more farmland and woodland with a few homes, passing north of State Correctional Institution – Mercer and crossing the Neshannock Creek into East Lackawannock Township.

The route heads into residential areas and turns north onto South Pitt Street, entering the borough of Mercer. Here, PA 258 passes more homes and comes to an intersection with PA 58 in the downtown area. At this point, the route turns west to join PA 58 on a one-way pair that follows North Diamond Street northbound and South Diamond Street southbound, passing through the commercial downtown with the Mercer County Courthouse located between the two streets. At the end of the one-way pair, the two routes come to an intersection with US 19 and US 62. Here, PA 58 turns north to follow US 19 and US 62 on North Erie Street while US 62 and PA 258 continue west on two-lane undivided West Market Street. The two routes head into residential areas, intersecting PA 158. PA 258 splits from US 62 by turning north onto North Maple Street. The route passes more homes, curving to the northwest. The road heads into Coolspring Township and becomes Clarksville Road, heading into a mix of farms and woods with some residences. PA 258 briefly heads through East Lackawannock Township again and back into Coolspring Township before crossing into Jefferson Township. The road becomes South Lake Road and runs northwest through more rural areas. The route becomes Lake road and turns west into more wooded areas with some fields and homes, forming the southern border of the Shenango Lake Recreation Area as it runs a short distance to the south of Shenango River Lake. PA 258 continues west into the borough of Clark and heads through more rural areas before continuing into residential areas, ending at an intersection with PA 18.

== Major intersections ==
County	Location	mi	km	Destinations	Notes
Butler	Slippery Rock	0.000	0.000	PA 173 south (South Main Street)	Continuation beyond southern terminus
Butler	Slippery Rock	0.000	0.000	PA 108 / PA 173 north (Franklin Street / New Castle Street) to I-79	
Mercer	Springfield Township	7.405	11.917	PA 208 east – Grove City	Southern end of concurrency with PA 208
Mercer	Springfield Township	7.770	12.505	I-79 to I-80 – Erie, Pittsburgh	Exit 113 on I-79
Mercer	Springfield Township	7.949	12.793	PA 208 west – New Wilmington	Northern end of concurrency with PA 208
Mercer	Mercer	15.373	24.740	PA 58 east (East Market Street) – Grove City	Southern end of concurrency with PA 58
Mercer	Mercer	15.510	24.961	US 19 north / US 62 north / PA 58 west (Erie Street) – Greenville, Meadville	Northern end of concurrency with PA 58; southern end of wrong-way concurrency with US 19 / US 62
Mercer	Mercer	15.533	24.998	US 19 south (Erie Street) to I-80 – Zelienople	Northern end of wrong-way concurrency with US 19
Mercer	Mercer	15.648	25.183	PA 158 south (South Shenango Street) to PA 318	Northern terminus of PA 158
Mercer	Mercer	15.756	25.357	US 62 south (West Market Street)	Northern end of wrong-way concurrency with US 62
Mercer	Clark	26.915– 26.958	43.315– 43.385	PA 18 (North Hermitage Road) – Greenville, Hermitage, Sharon	Northern terminus
1.000 mi = 1.609 km; 1.000 km = 0.621 mi: Concurrency terminus
