= Barkeyville, Pennsylvania =

Borough in Pennsylvania, US

- Borough
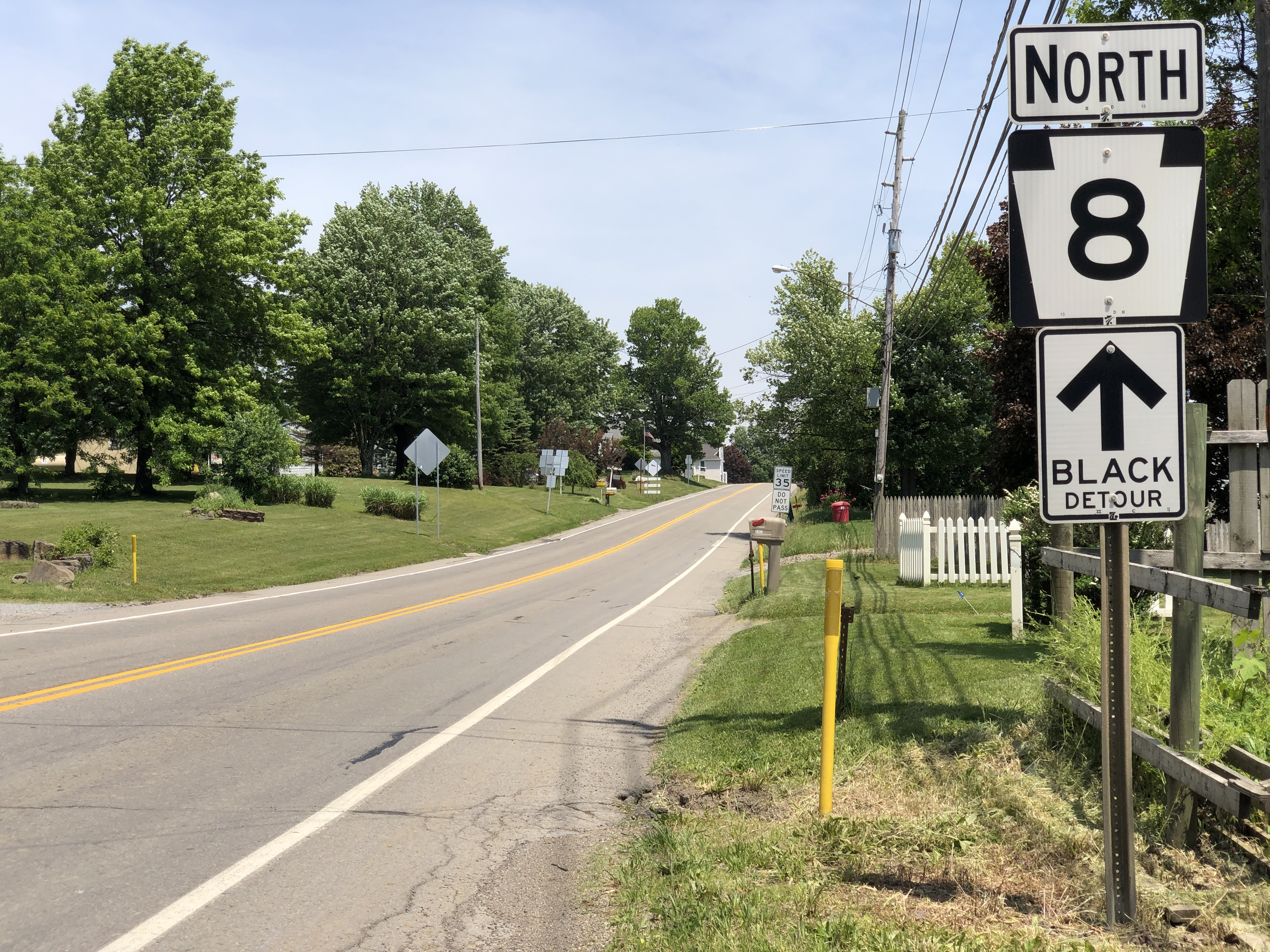
- PA 8 in Barkeyville

- Location of Barkeyville in Venango County, Pennsylvania.

- Location within Pennsylvania
- Coordinates: 41°12′01″N 79°58′58″W
- Country: United States
- State: Pennsylvania
- County: Venango
- Settled: 1796

Government
  - Type: Borough Council

Area
  - Total: 3.32 sq mi (8.60 km^{2})
  - Land: 3.32 sq mi (8.60 km^{2})
  - Water: 0 sq mi (0.00 km^{2})

Population (2020)
  - Total: 188
  - Density: 56.6/sq mi (21.85/km^{2})
- Time zone: UTC-5 (Eastern (EST))
  - Summer (DST): UTC-4 (EDT)
- Zip code: 16038
- Area code: 814
- FIPS code: 42-04136
- Website: https://www.barkeyvilleboro.com/

Barkeyville is a borough in Venango County, Pennsylvania, United States. The population was 186 at the 2020 census.

== Geography ==
Barkeyville is located at 41°12′1″N 79°58′58″W (41.200251, -79.982891).

According to the United States Census Bureau, the borough has a total area of 3.5 square miles (9.1 km^{2}), all land.

== Demographics ==
Historical population
Census	Pop.	Note	%±
1880	95		—
1970	302		—
1980	266		−11.9%
1990	274		3.0%
2000	237		−13.5%
2010	207		−12.7%
2020	188		−9.2%
2021 (est.)	184	▼	−2.1%

As of the census of 2000, there were 237 people, 91 households, and 71 families residing in the borough. The population density was 67.8 inhabitants per square mile (26.2/km^{2}). There were 106 housing units at an average density of 30.3 per square mile (11.7/km^{2}). The racial makeup of the borough was 97.05% White, and 2.95% Asian.

There were 91 households, out of which 24.2% had children under the age of 18 living with them, 65.9% were married couples living together, 6.6% had a female householder with no husband present, and 20.9% were non-families. 17.6% of all households were made up of individuals, and 8.8% had someone living alone who was 65 years of age or older. The average household size was 2.60 and the average family size was 2.85.

In the borough the population was spread out, with 21.5% under the age of 18, 5.5% from 18 to 24, 30.4% from 25 to 44, 24.9% from 45 to 64, and 17.7% who were 65 years of age or older. The median age was 42 years. For every 100 females there were 99.2 males. For every 100 females age 18 and over, there were 100.0 males.

The median income for a household in the borough was $41,500, and the median income for a family was $42,500. Males had a median income of $33,750 versus $20,682 for females. The per capita income for the borough was $16,161. About 8.8% of families and 12.7% of the population were below the poverty line, including 28.1% of those under the age of eighteen and 10.3% of those 65 or over.
