= Washington Township, Clarion County, Pennsylvania =

Township in Pennsylvania, US

Coordinates: 41°22′36″N 79°22′59″W

- Township
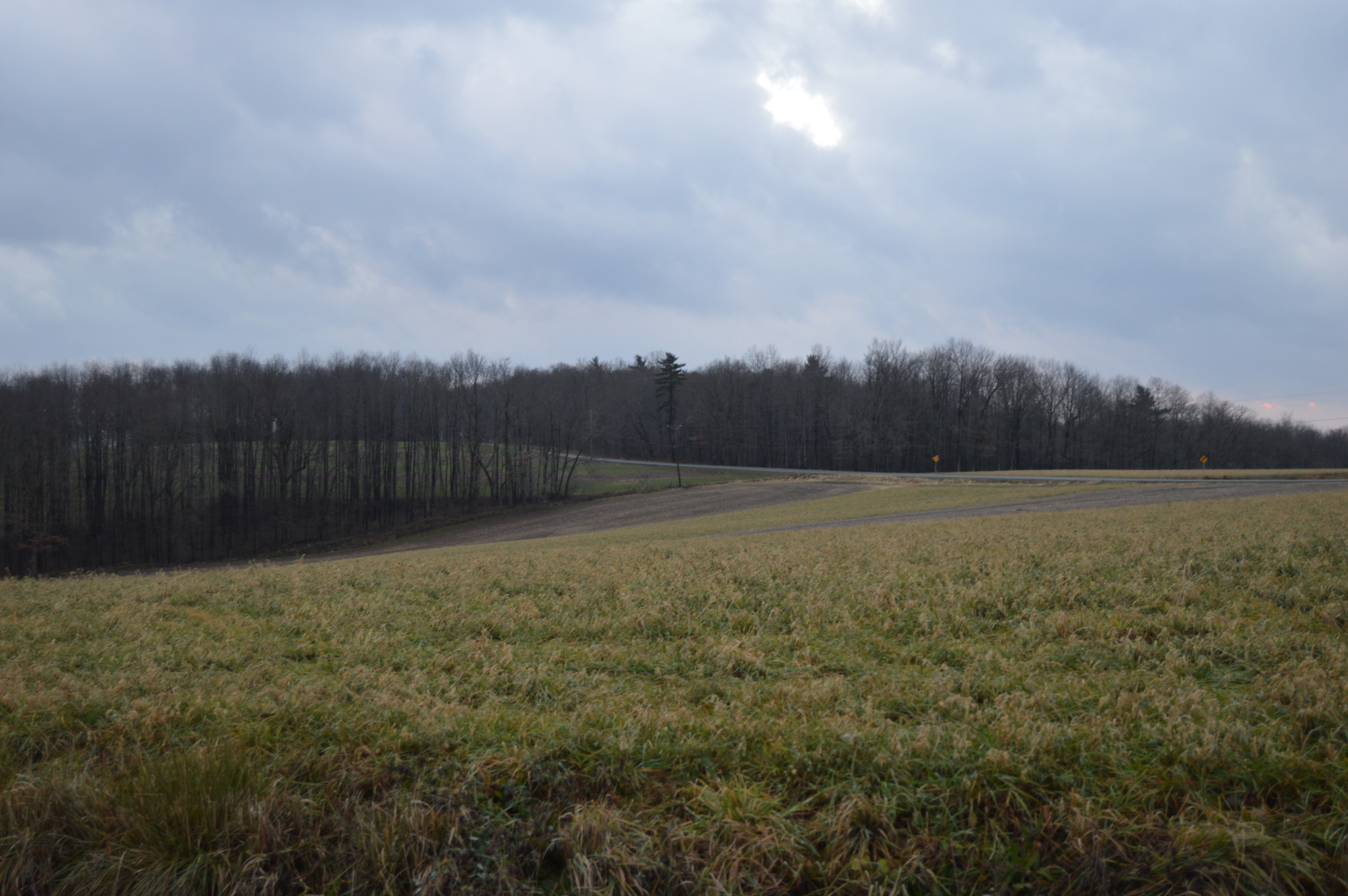
- Fields in the township's southwest

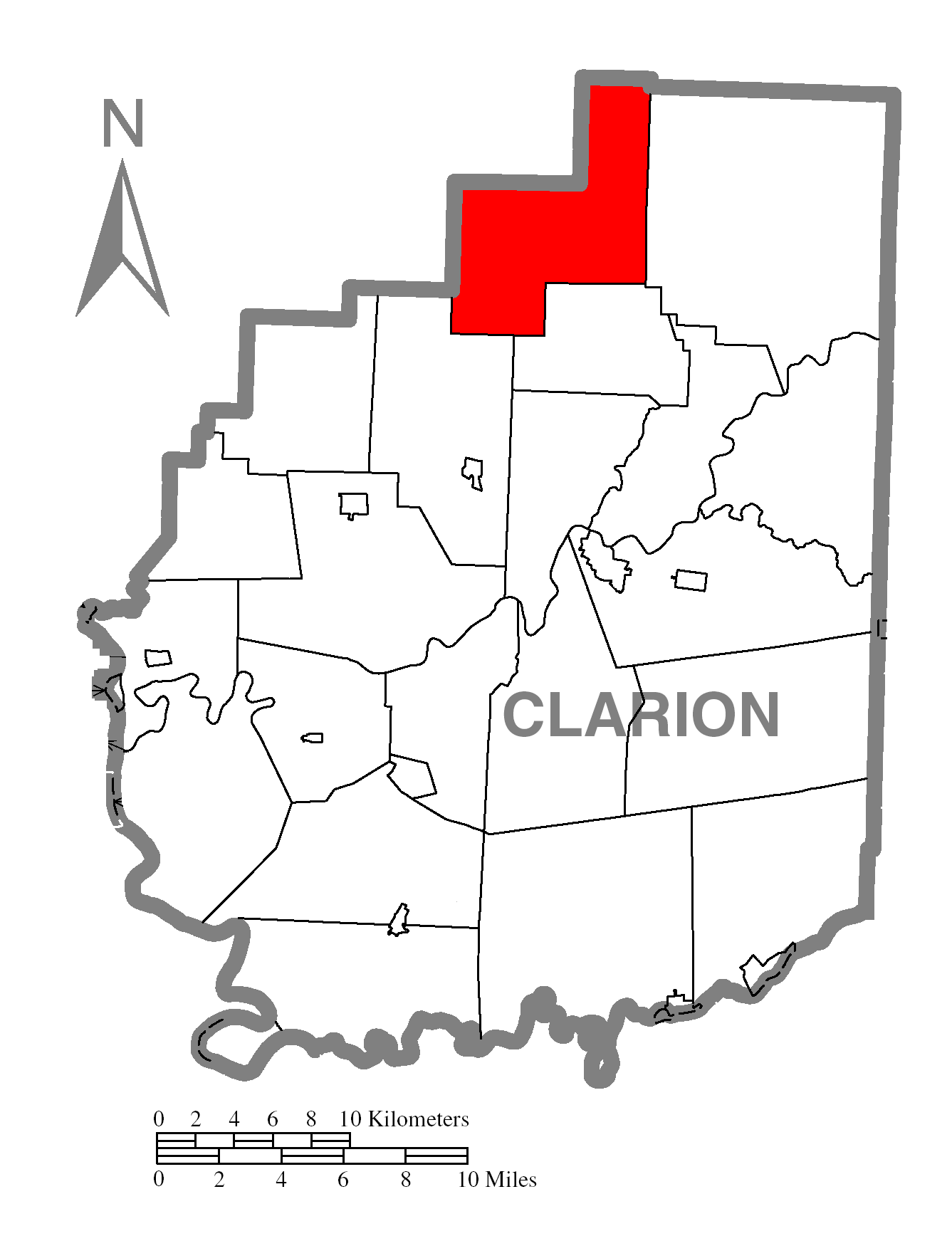
- Map of Clarion County, Pennsylvania highlighting Washington Township

- Map of Clarion County, Pennsylvania
- Country: United States
- State: Pennsylvania
- County: Clarion
- Settled: 1815
- Incorporated: 1843

Government
  - Type: Board Of Supervisors
  - Supervisors Chair: Mark T. Beichner
  - Supervisor: Eric Bauer
  - Supervisor: Robert E. Carbaugh, Jr.

Area
  - Total: 33.01 sq mi (85.50 km^{2})
  - Land: 32.94 sq mi (85.32 km^{2})
  - Water: 0.069 sq mi (0.18 km^{2})

Population (2020)
  - Total: 1,869
  - Estimate (2021): 1,870
  - Density: 54.8/sq mi (21.14/km^{2})
- Time zone: UTC-5 (Eastern (EST))
  - Summer (DST): UTC-4 (EDT)
- FIPS code: 42-031-81208

Washington Township is a township in Clarion County, Pennsylvania, United States. The population was 1,869 at the 2020 census, a decrease from the figure of 1,887 tabulated in 2010.

== Geography ==
The township is located in northern Clarion County and is bordered on the north by Forest County and on the west by Venango County. The unincorporated communities of Fryburg and Marble are in the southwestern part of the township, along Pennsylvania Route 208. The community of Licking is in the east, also along PA 208, and Newmansville is in the north, along Pennsylvania Route 36. Wolf's Corners is also in the north near the intersection of Rtes. 3001 and 4017. According to the United States Census Bureau, the township has a total area of 33.0 square miles (85.5 km^{2}), of which 32.9 square miles (85.3 km^{2}) is land and 0.08 square miles (0.2 km^{2}), or 0.21%, is water.

== Demographics ==
Historical population
Census	Pop.	Note	%±
2010	1,887		—
2020	1,869		−1.0%
2021 (est.)	1,870		0.1%
U.S. Decennial Census

As of the census of 2000, there were 2,037 people, 744 households, and 555 families residing in the township. The population density was 62.6 inhabitants per square mile (24.2/km^{2}). There were 1,109 housing units at an average density of 34.1 per square mile (13.2/km^{2}). The racial makeup of the township was 99.36% White, 0.10% African American, 0.10% Asian, and 0.44% from two or more races. Hispanic or Latino of any race were 0.15% of the population.

There were 744 households, out of which 33.5% had children under the age of 18 living with them, 61.4% were married couples living together, 8.2% had a female householder with no husband present, and 25.3% were non-families. 21.5% of all households were made up of individuals, and 8.7% had someone living alone who was 65 years of age or older. The average household size was 2.74 and the average family size was 3.23.

In the township the population was spread out, with 29.7% under the age of 18, 7.0% from 18 to 24, 27.5% from 25 to 44, 23.4% from 45 to 64, and 12.3% who were 65 years of age or older. The median age was 36 years. For every 100 females there were 103.7 males. For every 100 females age 18 and over, there were 98.5 males.

The median income for a household in the township was $31,250, and the median income for a family was $35,750. Males had a median income of $30,000 versus $18,289 for females. The per capita income for the township was $13,218. About 16.6% of families and 22.0% of the population were below the poverty line, including 30.5% of those under age 18 and 19.4% of those age 65 or over.
