= Shippenville, Pennsylvania =

Borough in Pennsylvania, US

- Borough
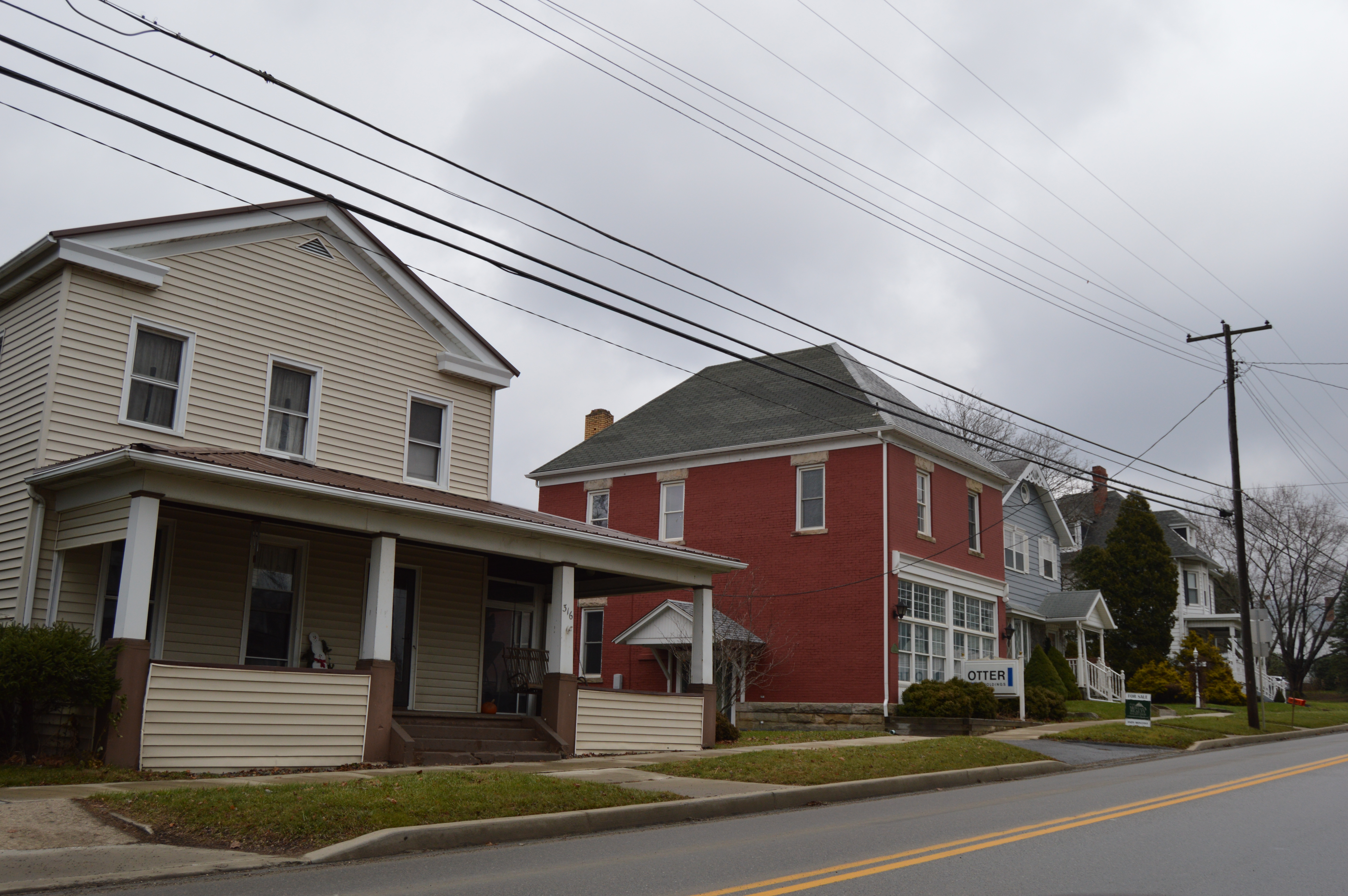
- Houses on Main Street

- Location of Shippenville in Clarion County, Pennsylvania.

- Map showing Clarion County in Pennsylvania

- Location within Pennsylvania
- Coordinates: 41°15′03″N 79°27′45″W
- Country: United States
- State: Pennsylvania
- County: Clarion
- Settled: 1826
- Incorporated: 1889

Government
  - Type: Borough Council
  - Mayor: Eric Sterner (R)

Area
  - Total: 0.39 sq mi (1.00 km^{2})
  - Land: 0.39 sq mi (1.00 km^{2})
  - Water: 0 sq mi (0.00 km^{2})
- Elevation: 1,342 ft (409 m)

Population (2020)
  - Total: 442
  - Density: 1,139.7/sq mi (440.05/km^{2})
- Time zone: UTC-5 (Eastern (EST))
  - Summer (DST): UTC-4 (EDT)
- ZIP code: 16254
- FIPS code: 42-70368
- Website: www.shippenvilleboro.com

Shippenville is a borough in Clarion County, Pennsylvania, United States. The population was 446 at the 2020 census.

== Geography ==
Shippenville is located in northwestern Clarion County at 41°15′3″N 79°27′45″W (41.250919, -79.462534). U.S. Route 322 passes through the borough, leading southeast 5 miles (8 km) to Clarion, the county seat, and northwest 23 miles (37 km) to Franklin. Interstate 80 is 5 miles (8 km) to the south via US 322 and Pennsylvania Route 66.

According to the United States Census Bureau, Shippenville has a total area of 0.31 square miles (0.79 km^{2}), all land.

== Demographics ==
Historical population
Census	Pop.	Note	%±
1880	388		—
1890	336		−13.4%
1900	313		−6.8%
1910	378		20.8%
1920	452		19.6%
1930	473		4.6%
1940	517		9.3%
1950	522		1.0%
1960	599		14.8%
1970	602		0.5%
1980	558		−7.3%
1990	474		−15.1%
2000	505		6.5%
2010	480		−5.0%
2020	442		−7.9%
2021 (est.)	444	▲	0.5%
U.S. Decennial Census

As of the census of 2000, there were 505 people, 209 households, and 138 families residing in the borough. The population density was 1,241.8 inhabitants per square mile (479.5/km^{2}). There were 226 housing units at an average density of 555.7 per square mile (214.6/km^{2}). The racial makeup of the borough was 99.01% White, 0.59% Asian and 0.40% Pacific Islander. Hispanic or Latino of any race were 0.59% of the population.

There were 209 households, out of which 29.2% had children under the age of 18 living with them, 53.1% were married couples living together, 9.1% had a female householder with no husband present, and 33.5% were non-families. 27.3% of all households were made up of individuals, and 13.4% had someone living alone who was 65 years of age or older. The average household size was 2.38 and the average family size was 2.89.

In the borough the population was spread out, with 21.8% under the age of 18, 8.3% from 18 to 24, 26.7% from 25 to 44, 22.8% from 45 to 64, and 20.4% who were 65 years of age or older. The median age was 40 years. For every 100 females there were 96.5 males. For every 100 females age 18 and over, there were 88.1 males.

The median income for a household in the borough was $31,667, and the median income for a family was $34,773. Males had a median income of $26,250 versus $20,125 for females. The per capita income for the borough was $16,216. About 11.8% of families and 12.1% of the population were below the poverty line, including 17.5% of those under age 18 and 3.1% of those age 65 or over.
