= Pennsylvania Route 38 =

State highway in Pennsylvania, US

Pennsylvania Route 38

Route information
- Maintained by PennDOT
- Length: 40.2 mi (64.7 km)

Major junctions
- South end: US 422 / PA 68 in Butler
- I-80 in Emlenton
- North end: US 322 in Rockland Township

Location
- Country: United States
- State: Pennsylvania
- Counties: Butler, Venango, Clarion

Highway system
- Pennsylvania State Route System; Interstate; US; State; Scenic; Legislative
← PA 37	→ PA 39

Pennsylvania Route 38 (PA 38) is a 40.2-mile-long (64.7 km) state highway located in northwest Pennsylvania. The southern terminus is at U.S. Route 422 (US 422) and PA 68 northeast of downtown Butler. The northern terminus is at US 322 in Rockland Township.

== Route description ==
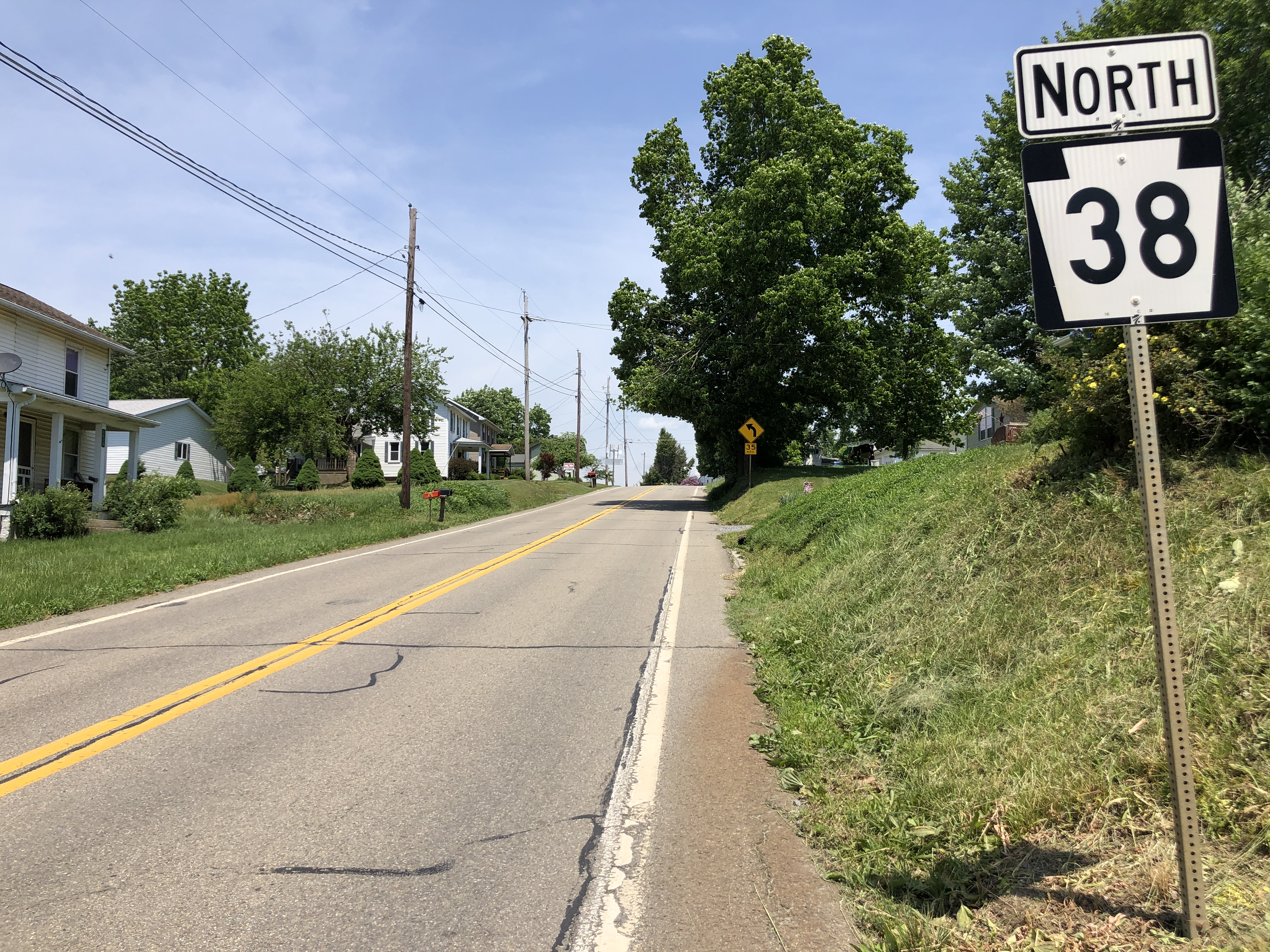
PA 38 northbound past PA 208 in Mariasville

=== Butler County ===
PA 38 begins at an intersection with PA 68 at an interchange with the US 422 freeway in Summit Township, Butler County, heading north on two-lane undivided Oneida Valley Road. The road passes a few businesses before heading into wooded areas with some development, running to the east of Connoquenessing Creek and crossing into Oakland Township. The route heads through woodland with some homes and curves northwest, heading into Center Township. PA 38 curves north again before turning northeast and crossing the creek, heading back into Oakland Township and heading through dense woodland as it runs along the northwestern shore of Lake Oneida. The road passes through Boydstown and winds northeast through a mix of farms and woods with some homes. The route winds north and heads into Concord Township, passing through Greece City and continuing through wooded areas with some farm fields and residences. PA 38 passes through Hooker and heads northeast, turning north again and entering Washington Township. The road passes through open agricultural areas before heading into the residential community of North Washington, where it intersects PA 138.

The route runs north-northeast through more farmland and woodland with some homes, passing through Parsonville and Annisville. PA 38 heads through wooded areas with some development, turning northwest into Venango Township. The road curves north into agricultural areas with some residences, crossing into the borough of Eau Claire. The route becomes South Washington Street and passes homes, coming to an intersection with PA 58. At this point, PA 38 becomes North Washington Street and runs through more residential areas before heading into the borough of Cherry Valley and becoming Oneida Valley Road again. The road heads through farmland and woodland with some homes, turning to the northeast. The route continues into Allegheny Township and passes through more rural areas, passing businesses as it runs through Sandy Point.

=== Venango and Clarion counties ===
PA 38 enters Scrubgrass Township in Venango County and comes to an interchange with I-80. A short distance later, the route intersects PA 208 and turns east to form a concurrency with that route on Emlenton Clintonville Road. The road passes through woodland with some farm fields and homes, crossing into the borough of Emlenton. PA 38/PA 208 heads through wooded areas along the south bank of the Allegheny River and turns north, with PA 268 continuing east on Emlenton Clintonville Road. The two routes cross the river, at which point it is in Scrubgrass Township again, and heads back into Emlenton, entering the commercial downtown on 5th Street. PA 38/PA 208 turns east onto Main Street and passes homes and businesses. The road crosses Richey Run into Clarion County, continuing through Emlenton and heading north through forested areas as an unnamed road. The two routes curve east and head into Richland Township, heading through more wooded areas with some homes a short distance to the north of I-80. PA 38/PA 208 crosses into Richland Township in Venango County and intersects the western terminus of PA 478 at another interchange with I-80.

The road heads back into Richland Township, Clarion County and passes through more rural areas, soon entering Salem Township. Here, PA 208 splits from PA 38 by heading northeast. PA 38 crosses back into Richland Township, Venango County and passes through Mariasville, heading northwest through farms and woods with some homes and turning north at Distlers Corners. The road continues north through more rural areas and curves northeast. The route heads east before another turn back to the northeast near Nickleville. The road turns north into wooded areas with some farm fields and residences, entering Rockland Township. Here, PA 38 comes to its northern terminus at US 322.

== Major intersections ==
County	Location	mi	km	Destinations	Notes
Butler	Summit Township	0.0	0.0	US 422 / PA 68 (Chicora Road) – Butler, Kittanning, New Castle	Southern terminus; partial cloverleaf interchange
Butler	Washington Township	14.2	22.9	PA 138 north (North Washington Road) – West Sunbury	Eastern terminus of PA 138
Butler	Eau Claire	20.9	33.6	PA 58 (Main Street) – Foxburg, Harrisville	
Venango	Scrubgrass Township	26.0	41.8	I-80 – Clarion, Sharon	Exit 42 (I-80); diamond interchange
Venango	Scrubgrass Township	26.2	42.2	PA 208 west (Emlenton Clintonville Road) – Clintonville	South end of PA 208 concurrency
Venango	Emlenton	27.8	44.7	PA 268 south – Parker	Northern terminus of PA 268
Venango	Richland Township	30.1	48.4	PA 478 east to I-80 east – St. Petersburg, Clarion	Western terminus of PA 478
Venango	Richland Township	30.3	48.8	I-80 west – Sharon	Exit 45 (I-80); westbound entrance and eastbound exit
Clarion	Salem Township	31.8	51.2	PA 208 east	North end of PA 208 concurrency
Venango	Rockland Township	40.2	64.7	US 322 (Lakes to Sea Highway) – Franklin, Clarion	Northern terminus
1.000 mi = 1.609 km; 1.000 km = 0.621 mi: Concurrency terminus; Incomplete access
