= Pennsylvania Route 58 =

State highway in Pennsylvania, US

Pennsylvania Route 58

Route information
- Maintained by PennDOT
- Length: 71.2 mi (114.6 km)

Major junctions
- West end: SR 5 near Jamestown
- US 322 in Jamestown; PA 18 / PA 358 in Greenville; US 19 / US 62 / PA 258 in Mercer; PA 173 / PA 208 in Grove City; PA 8 in Harrisville; PA 308 in Marion Township; PA 38 in Eau Claire; PA 268 in Hovey Township; PA 478 in St. Petersburg; PA 338 in Richland Township
- East end: PA 68 in Sligo

Location
- Country: United States
- State: Pennsylvania
- Counties: Mercer, Butler, Armstrong, Clarion

Highway system
- Pennsylvania State Route System; Interstate; US; State; Scenic; Legislative
← PA 57	→ PA 59
← PA 456	PA 458	→ PA 462

Pennsylvania Route 58 (PA 58) is located in Western Pennsylvania, running 71.2 miles from Ohio State Route 5 (SR 5) at the Ohio state line 3 miles (4.8 km) west of Jamestown in Mercer County to PA 68 in Sligo in Clarion County.

== Route description ==
=== Mercer and Butler counties ===
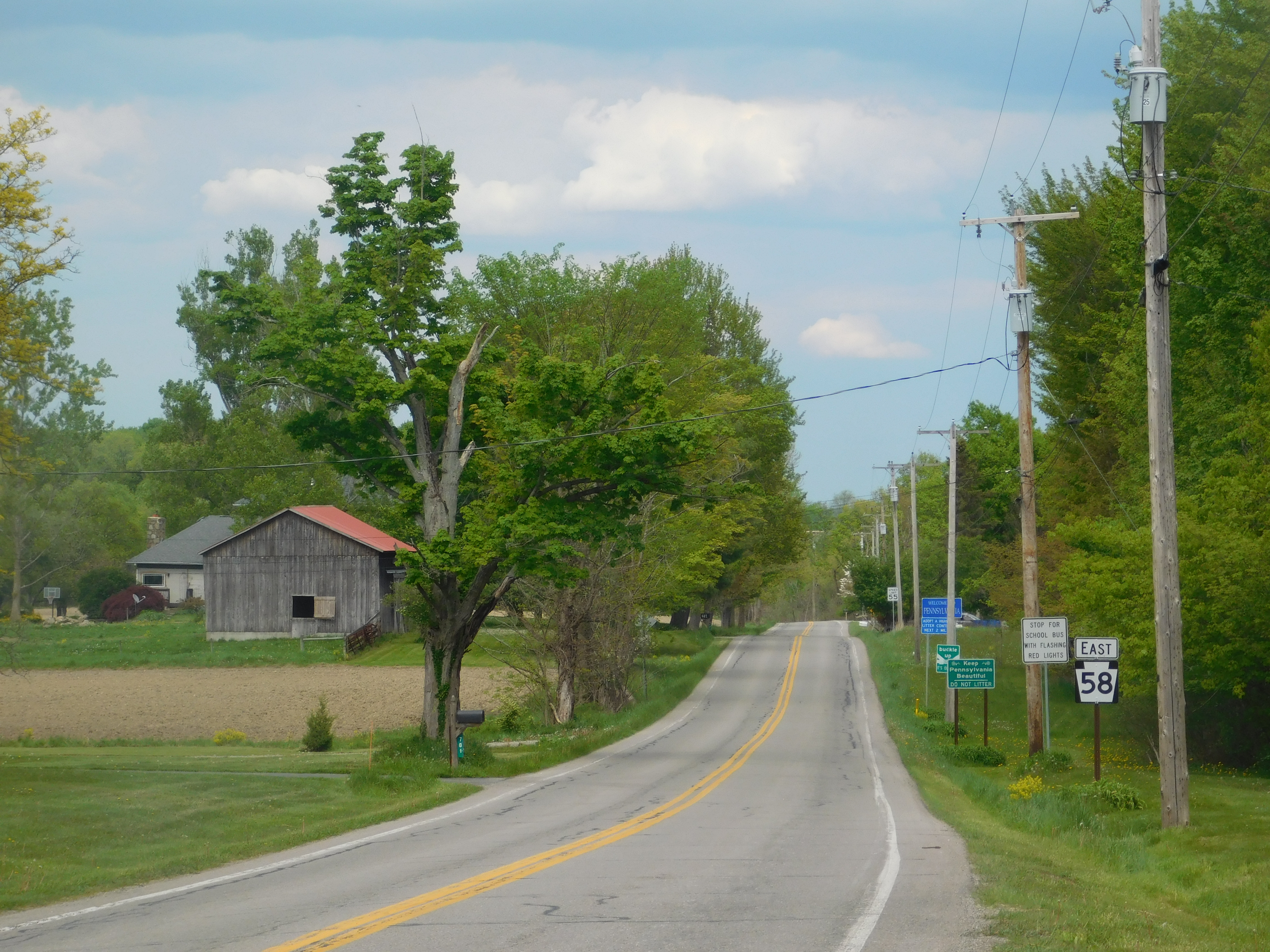
PA 58 east from the Pennsylvania-Ohio state line

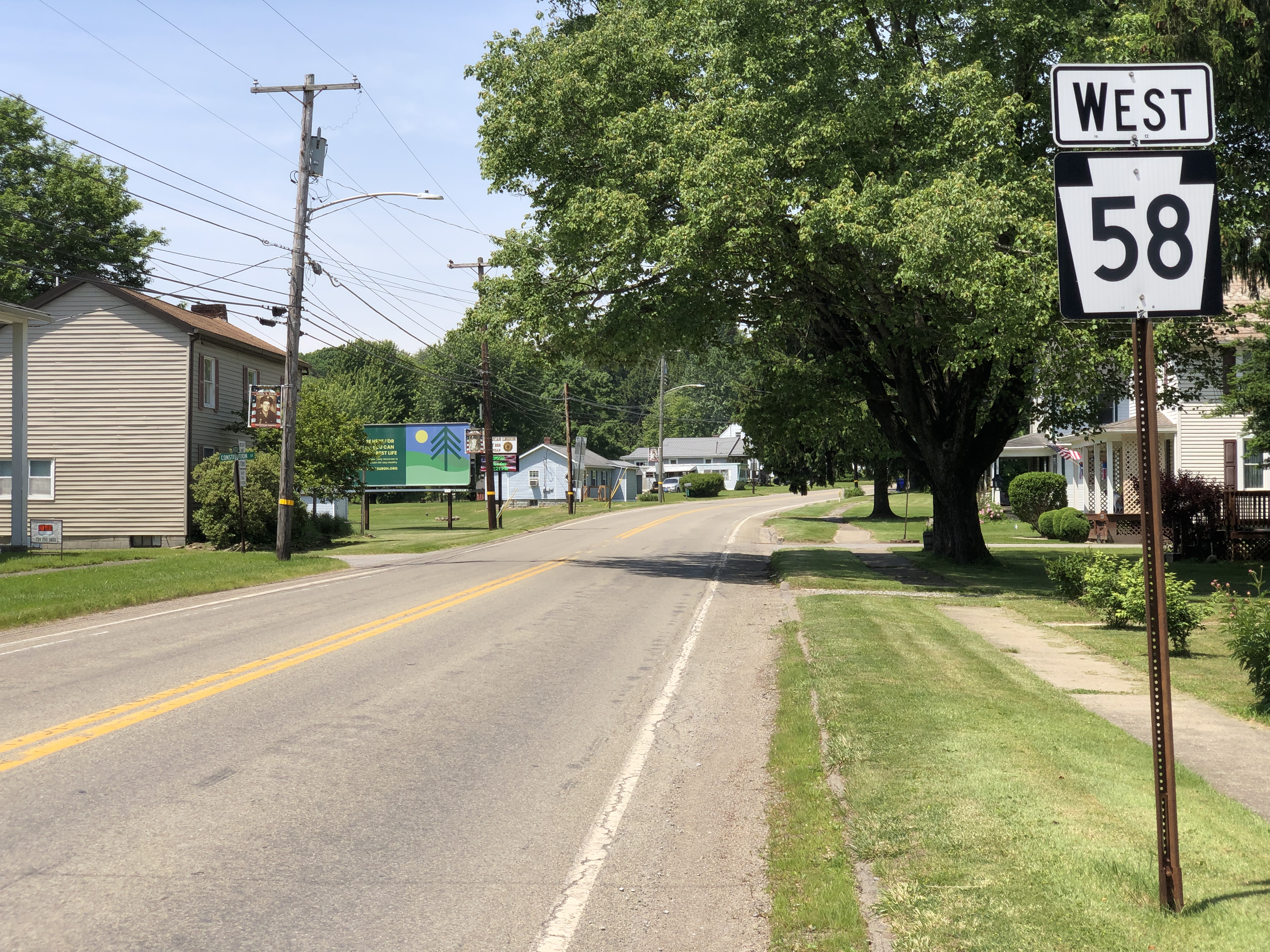
PA 58 westbound past PA 8 in Harrisville

PA 58 travels eastward from the Ohio state line in northwestern Mercer County just over 4 miles (6.4 km) to the borough of Jamestown, where, after passing through a low-clearance tunnel beneath an abandoned railroad right-of-way, it intersects with US 322. The two routes join together and continue eastward nearly 0.3 miles (0.48 km) where US 322 leaves northward. PA 58 continues eastward, then turns southeasterly, and about 6 miles (9.7 km) later, joins PA Route 18 just north of the Greenville borough line. The concurrency continues 0.4 miles (0.64 km) into the borough to its junction with PA Route 358. The three routes form a concurrency and head westward – this segment is what is known as a wrong way concurrency, because PA 58 is signed east at the same time that Route 358 is signed west. The concurrency lasts only a quarter mile, and then PA 58 leaves the concurrency, heading south-southeast nearly 15 miles (24 km) to the borough of Mercer. Here, the route first meets the US 19/US 62 concurrency. The three routes form a concurrency south 0.2 miles (0.32 km) to the intersection of PA Route 258. At this complex intersection, the concurrency ends, US 62 continues westward, concurrent with Route 258, US 19 continues south, and Routes 58 and 258 join to the east. Also at this point, the PA 58/PA 258 concurrency is split – eastbound follows South Diamond Street, and westbound follows North Diamond Street in the middle of town. At the east end of the “square,” the concurrency ends as Route 258 heads southward and PA 58 continues east, then later turns southeast. It crosses both I-80 and I-79 near the interchange of the two interstates, just over 4 miles (6.4 km) from Mercer, and enters the borough of Grove City about 4.5 miles (7.2 km) later. In Grove City, the route intersects with the southern terminus of the PA Route 173/PA Route 208 concurrency, and overlaps with Route 173, continuing southeast. About 0.3 miles (0.48 km) later, the concurrency ends; Route 173 continues south, and PA 58 continues southeast just over 3 miles (4.8 km) to the Butler county line after spending 39 miles in Mercer County.

A mile after entering Butler County, PA 58 intersects with PA Route 8 in the borough of Harrisville. The route then travels nearly 7 miles (11 km) to intersect with PA Route 308. The next major intersection is about 4.6 miles (7.4 km) later at PA Route 38 in the borough of Eau Claire. The route then travels nearly 6 miles (9.7 km) before crossing the next county line. The road spends about 18.5 miles in Butler County, serving as the main thoroughfare across the rural northern portion of the county.

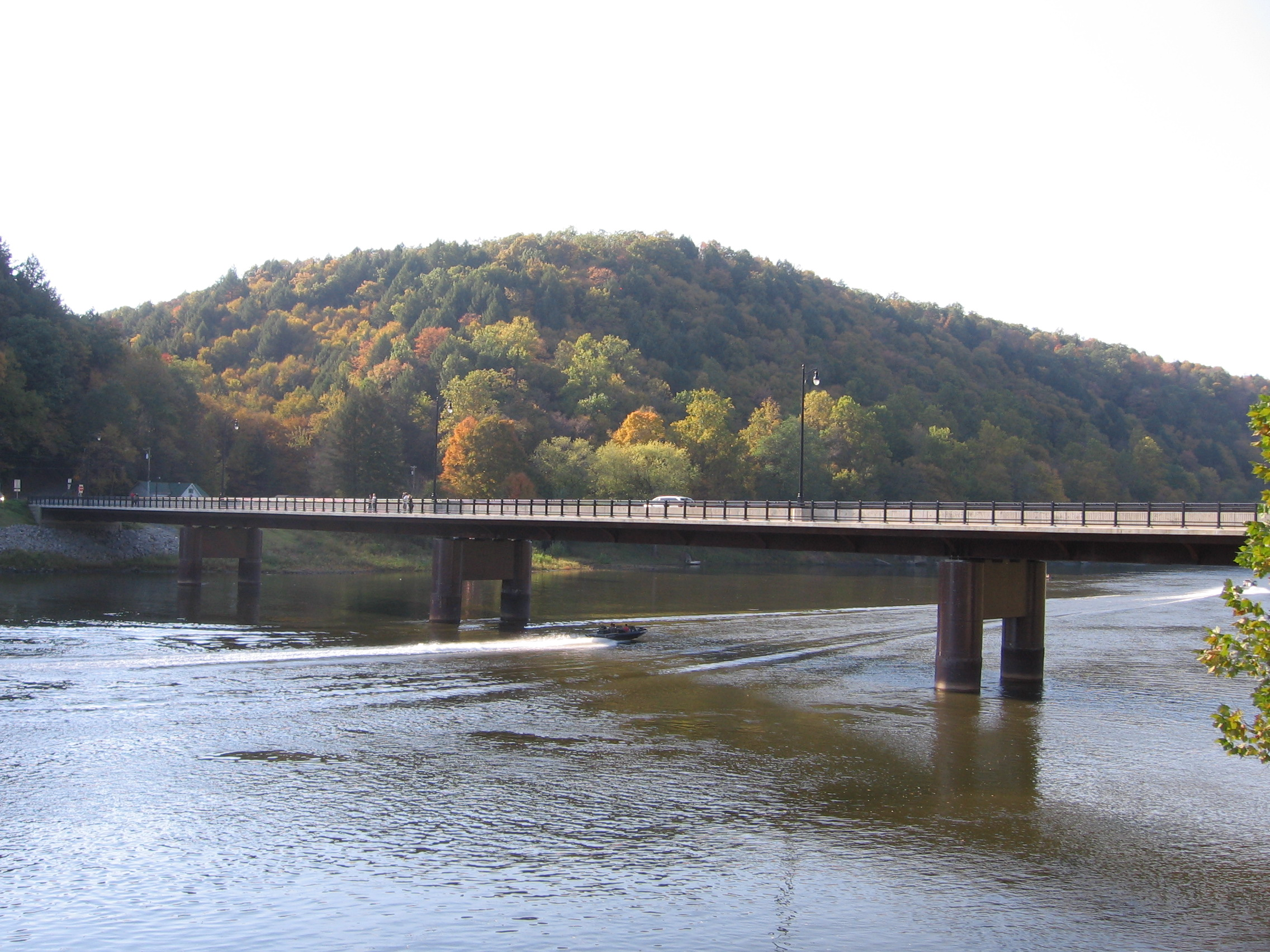
The Foxburg Bridge carries PA 58 over the Allegheny River between Armstrong and Clarion County.

=== Armstrong and Clarion counties ===
PA 58 has a very short stay in Armstrong County, passing through its extreme northwestern tip. Just 0.4 miles (0.64 km) from the county line, the route intersects with PA Route 268, it then crosses Allegheny River on the Foxburg Bridge, leaving the county just about 0.2 miles (0.32 km) later.

Turning northeasterly, the route passes through the borough of Foxburg upon entering Clarion County, and then heads northeast to enter the borough of St. Petersburg a little over 2 miles (3.2 km) later. Here, PA 58 intersects with the eastern terminus of PA Route 478, and then about 1.9 miles (3.1 km) later, it intersects with the western terminus of PA Route 338 at the village of Alum Rock. The route then winds southeastward 5.3 miles (8.5 km) to intersect with the eastern terminus of PA Route 368 just east of the borough of Callensburg. PA 58 then travels east-southeast nearly 3.5 miles (5.6 km) to its terminus at PA Route 68 in the borough of Sligo The road spends 13 miles in Clarion County.

== History ==
Pennsylvania Route 458
- Location: Greene Township-Jamestown
- Length: 3 mi (4.8 km)
- Existed: 1930–1946

The route was originally signed in 1927 from New Wilmington to Greenville on the current PA 18 alignment. The route was moved in 1928 to the Mercer-to-Greenville alignment. Connecting PA 458 was decommissioned and reassigned as PA 58 in 1946, extending the route from its previous western terminus at US 322 in Jamestown to its current location at the Ohio state line. In 1967 the eastern terminus was moved from PA 8 in Harrisville to its current location.

== Major intersections ==
County	Location	mi	km	Destinations	Notes
Mercer	Greene Township	0.0	0.0	SR 5 west (Street Road) – Kinsman	Western terminus of PA 58 at Ohio state line
Mercer	Jamestown	4.4	7.1	US 322 west (Gibson Street) – Cleveland	West end of US 322 concurrency
Mercer	Jamestown	4.7	7.6	US 322 east (Depot Street) – Conneaut Lake	East end of US 322 concurrency
Mercer	Hempfield Township	10.8	17.4	PA 18 north (Packard Avenue) – Conneaut Lake	West end of PA 18 concurrency
Mercer	Greenville	11.2	18.0	PA 358 east (Main Street)	West end of PA 358 concurrency
Mercer	Greenville	11.5	18.5	PA 18 south / PA 358 west (Main Street)	East end of PA 18/358 concurrencies
Mercer	Mercer	26.1	42.0	US 19 north / US 62 north (Franklin Street) – Franklin, Meadville	West end of US 19/62 concurrencies
Mercer	Mercer	26.3	42.3	US 19 south (Erie Street) to I-80 US 62 south / PA 258 north (Market Street) to PA 158 / PA 318 – Hermitage, Sharon	East end of US 19/62 concurrencies, West end of PA 258 concurrency
Mercer	Mercer	26.5	42.6	PA 258 south (Pitt Street)	East end of PA 258 concurrency
Mercer	Grove City	35.7	57.5	PA 173 north / PA 208 (Center Street) to I-79 / I-80	West end of PA 173 concurrency
Mercer	Grove City	36.0	57.9	PA 173 south (Liberty Street) – Slippery Rock	East end of PA 173 concurrency
Butler	Harrisville	40.2	64.7	PA 8 (Main Street)	
Butler	Marion Township	47.0	75.6	PA 308 (West Sunbury Road) – Clintonville, Butler	
Butler	Eau Claire	51.6	83.0	PA 38 (Washington Street) – Emlenton, Butler	
Armstrong	Hovey Township	58.0	93.3	PA 268 (Kittaning Pike) – Emlenton, Parker	
Clarion	St. Petersburg	60.5	97.4	PA 478 west (Salem Avenue) to I-80	Eastern terminus of PA 478
Clarion	Richland Township	62.4	100.4	PA 338 east – Knox	Western terminus of PA 338
Clarion	Licking Township	67.7	109.0	PA 368 west (Main Street) – Callensburg, Parker	Eastern terminus of PA 368
Clarion	Sligo	71.2	114.6	PA 68 (Front Street/Colleran Street) – Clarion, Rimersburg, East Brady	Eastern terminus of PA 58
1.000 mi = 1.609 km; 1.000 km = 0.621 mi: Concurrency terminus

== Attractions ==
- Pymatuning State Park near Jamestown
