= Richland Township, Pennsylvania =

Richland Township is the name of some places in the U.S. state of Pennsylvania:

- Richland Township, Allegheny County, Pennsylvania
- Richland Township, Bucks County, Pennsylvania
- Richland Township, Cambria County, Pennsylvania
- Richland Township, Clarion County, Pennsylvania
- Richland Township, Venango County, Pennsylvania
