= Pennsylvania Route 478 =

State highway in Pennsylvania, US

Pennsylvania Route 478

Route information
- Maintained by PennDOT
- Length: 2.20 mi (3.54 km)
- Existed: 1961–present

Major junctions
- West end: PA 38 / PA 208 near Emlenton
- I-80 near Emlenton
- East end: PA 58 in St. Petersburg

Location
- Country: United States
- State: Pennsylvania
- Counties: Clarion, Venango

Highway system
- Pennsylvania State Route System; Interstate; US; State; Scenic; Legislative
| ← PA 477 | → I-479 |

Pennsylvania Route 478 (PA 478) is a 2.20-mile-long (3.54 km) state highway located in Clarion and Venango counties. The highway begins at an intersection with PA 38 and PA 208 northeast of Emlenton. The highway serves the eastbound interchange for Exit 45 on Interstate 80 (I-80) and terminates at PA 58 in St. Petersburg.

The alignment of PA 478 began as part of the former alignment of PA 238 until 1936, when PA 378 was designated on the alignment. In 1961, to avoid duplication with the newly numbered I-378 in Bethlehem, the route was redesignated as PA 478.

== Route description ==
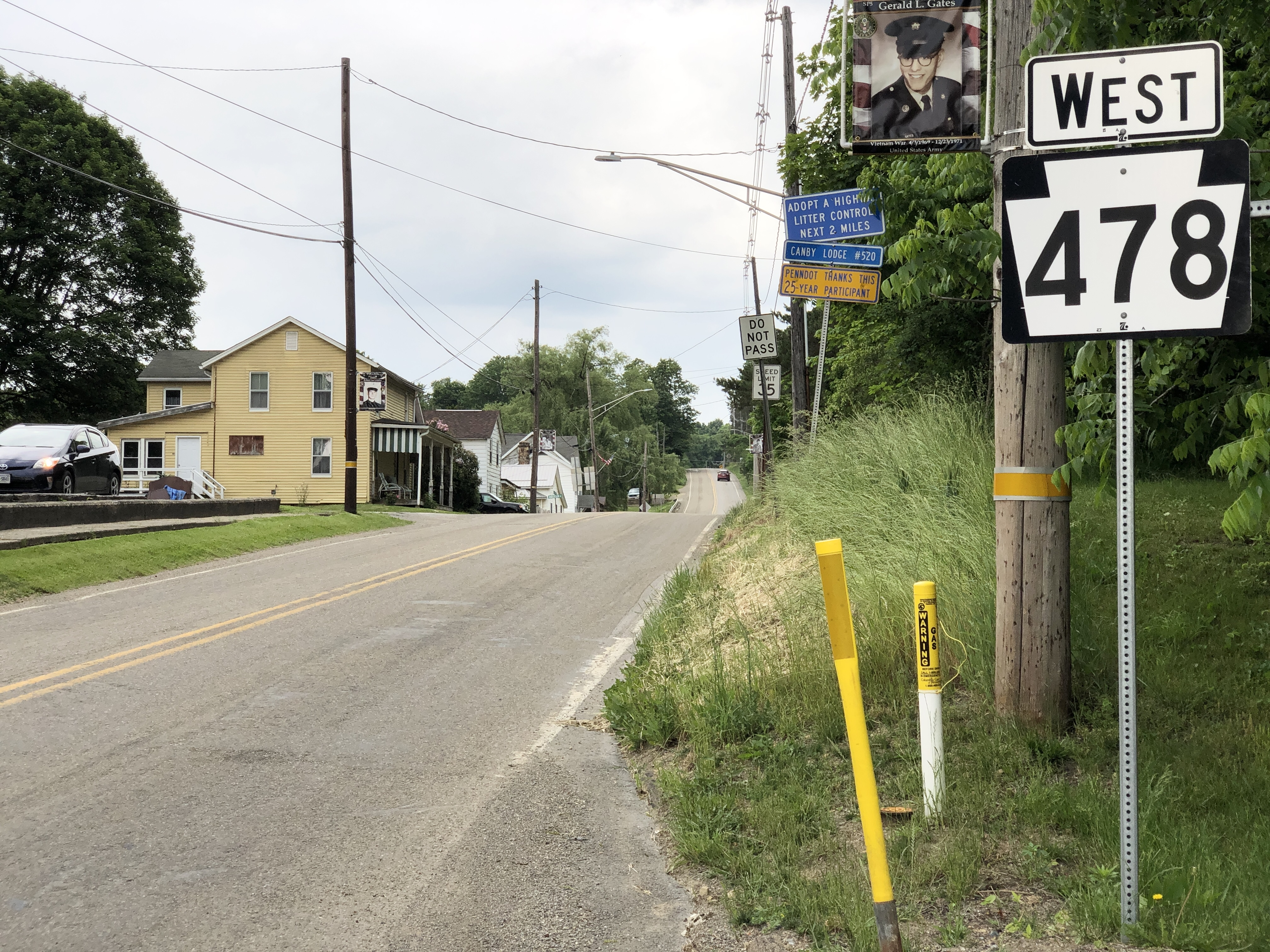
PA 478 westbound past PA 58 in St. Petersburg

PA 478 begins at an intersection with PA 38 and its concurrency with PA 208 northeast of the borough of Emlenton. The highway progresses to the southeast, crossing into Clarion County. There, PA 478 enters a partial interchange with I-80, intersecting with the westbound ramps for Exit 45. After I-80, PA 478 turns from its southward progression to the southeast, crossing through dense forestry. The highway soon turns back to the south, paralleling Freeman Road and entering the borough of St. Petersburg. In St. Petersburg, PA 478 becomes Salem Avenue, progressing southeast through residential areas and terminating at an intersection with PA 58 (Main Street).

== History ==
Pennsylvania Route 378
- Location: Emlenton – St. Petersburg
- Existed: 1936–1961

The alignment of PA 478 began in the 1928 numbering of state highways as an unnumbered state highway. However, the next year, the alignment was designated as part of PA 238, which ran from Saint Petersburg to Shippensville. This lasted only seven years, when PA 238 was realigned to terminate in Mariasville. In 1936, the alignment was replaced with PA 378, which remained intact as its alignment designation until 1961, when I-378 was designated for a freeway in Bethlehem. To avoid duplication, PA 378 was replaced with PA 478, a designation that had been unused until that point. The alignment has remained intact since.

== Major intersections ==
| County | Location | mi | km | Destinations | Notes |
|---|---|---|---|---|---|
| Venango | Richland Township | 0.00 | 0.00 | PA 38 / PA 208 to I-80 west – Emlenton, Knox, Sharon | Western terminus |
| Clarion | Richland Township | 0.24 | 0.39 | I-80 east – Clarion | Exit 45 (I-80); access to and from I-80 eastbound only |
| Clarion | St. Petersburg | 2.20 | 3.54 | PA 58 (Main Street) – Sligo, Foxburg | Eastern terminus |
1.000 mi = 1.609 km; 1.000 km = 0.621 mi: Incomplete access
