= Cherry Valley, Pennsylvania =

Borough in Pennsylvania, US

- Borough
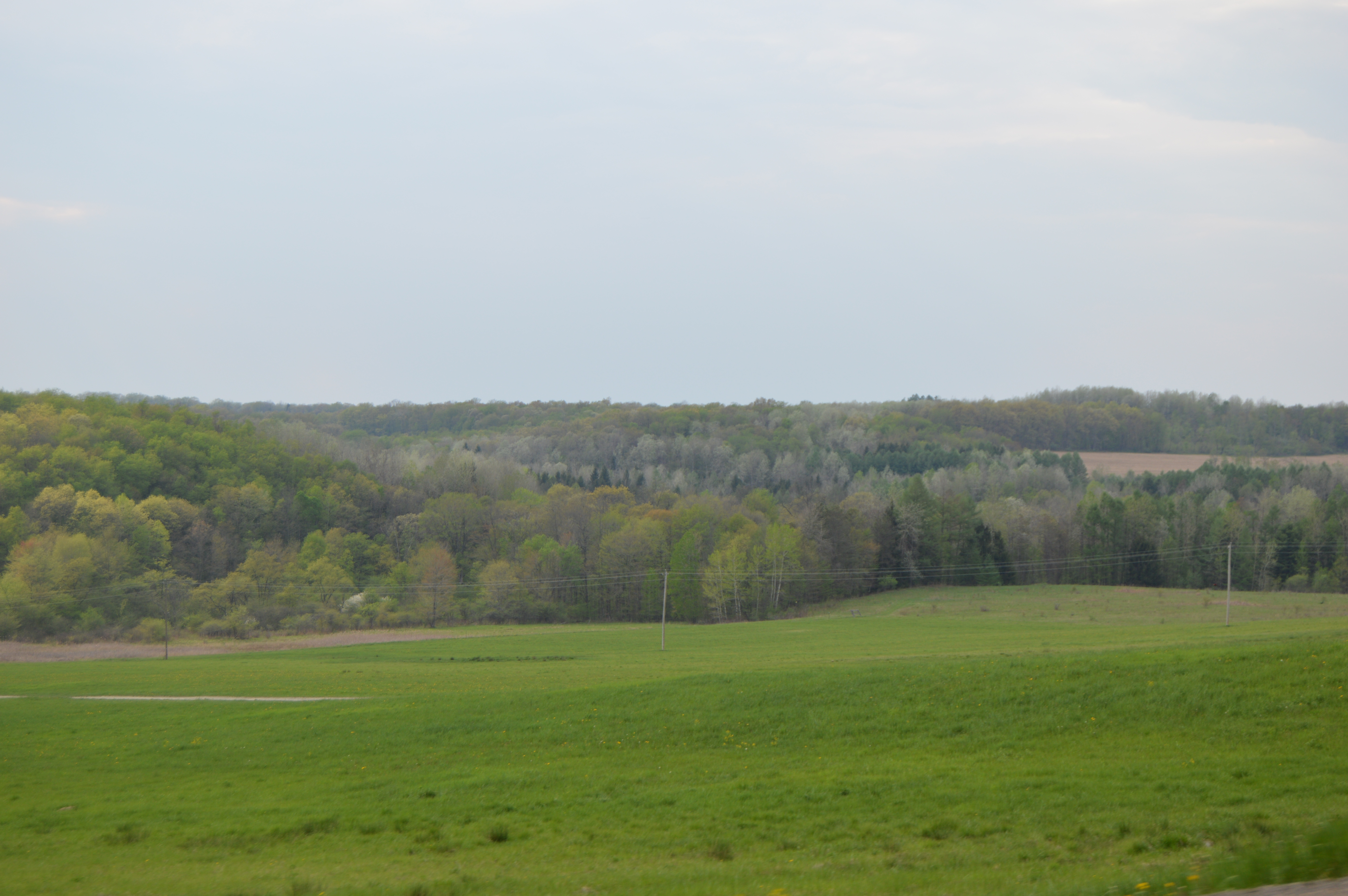
- Countryside along Pennsylvania Route 38

- Location of Cherry Valley in Butler County, Pennsylvania.

- Location within Pennsylvania
- Coordinates: 41°09′26″N 79°47′53″W
- Country: United States
- State: Pennsylvania
- County: Butler
- Incorporated: 1909

Government
  - Type: Borough Council
  - Mayor: Michael Bagdes-Canning (G)

Area
  - Total: 2.82 sq mi (7.30 km^{2})
  - Land: 2.82 sq mi (7.30 km^{2})
  - Water: 0 sq mi (0.00 km^{2})
- Elevation: 1,322 ft (403 m)

Population (2020)
  - Total: 60
  - Density: 21.3/sq mi (8.22/km^{2})
- Time zone: UTC-5 (Eastern (EST))
  - Summer (DST): UTC-4 (EDT)
- FIPS code: 42-13152

Cherry Valley is a borough in Butler County, Pennsylvania, United States. As of the 2020 census, Cherry Valley had a population of 60.

== Geography ==
Cherry Valley is located in northern Butler County at 41°09′26″N 79°47′53″W, along the Venango County border.

Pennsylvania Route 38 passes through the borough, leading east 3 miles (5 km) to Interstate 80, Exit 42 and 5 miles (8 km) to Emlenton, and to the south 1.5 miles (2.4 km) to Eau Claire.

According to the United States Census Bureau, the borough has a total area of 2.8 square miles (7.3 km^{2}), all land.

== Demographics ==
Historical population
Census	Pop.	Note	%±
1910	113		—
1920	83		−26.5%
1930	80		−3.6%
1940	97		21.3%
1950	94		−3.1%
1960	82		−12.8%
1970	73		−11.0%
1980	91		24.7%
1990	96		5.5%
2000	72		−25.0%
2010	66		−8.3%
2020	60		−9.1%

As of the 2000 census, there were 72 people, 27 households, and 18 families residing in the borough. The population density was 25.1 people per square mile (9.7/km^{2}). There were 31 housing units at an average density of 10.8 per square mile (4.2/km^{2}). The racial makeup of the borough was 100.00% White.

There were 27 households, out of which 18.5% had children under the age of 18 living with them, 66.7% were married couples living together, and 33.3% were non-families. 22.2% of all households were made up of individuals, and 11.1% had someone living alone who was 65 years of age or older. The average household size was 2.67 and the average family size was 3.22.

In the borough the population was spread out, with 22.2% under the age of 18, 6.9% from 18 to 24, 25.0% from 25 to 44, 33.3% from 45 to 64, and 12.5% who were 65 years of age or older. The median age was 43 years. For every 100 females there were 132.3 males. For every 100 females age 18 and over, there were 124.0 males.

The median income for a household in the borough was $51,250, and the median income for a family was $41,250. Males had a median income of $21,875 versus $21,875 for females. The per capita income for the borough was $14,915. There were 25.0% of families and 18.8% of the population living below the poverty line, including 37.5% of under eighteens and none of those over 64.

== Education ==
It is in the Moniteau School District.
