= Eau Claire, Pennsylvania =

Borough in Pennsylvania, US

- Borough
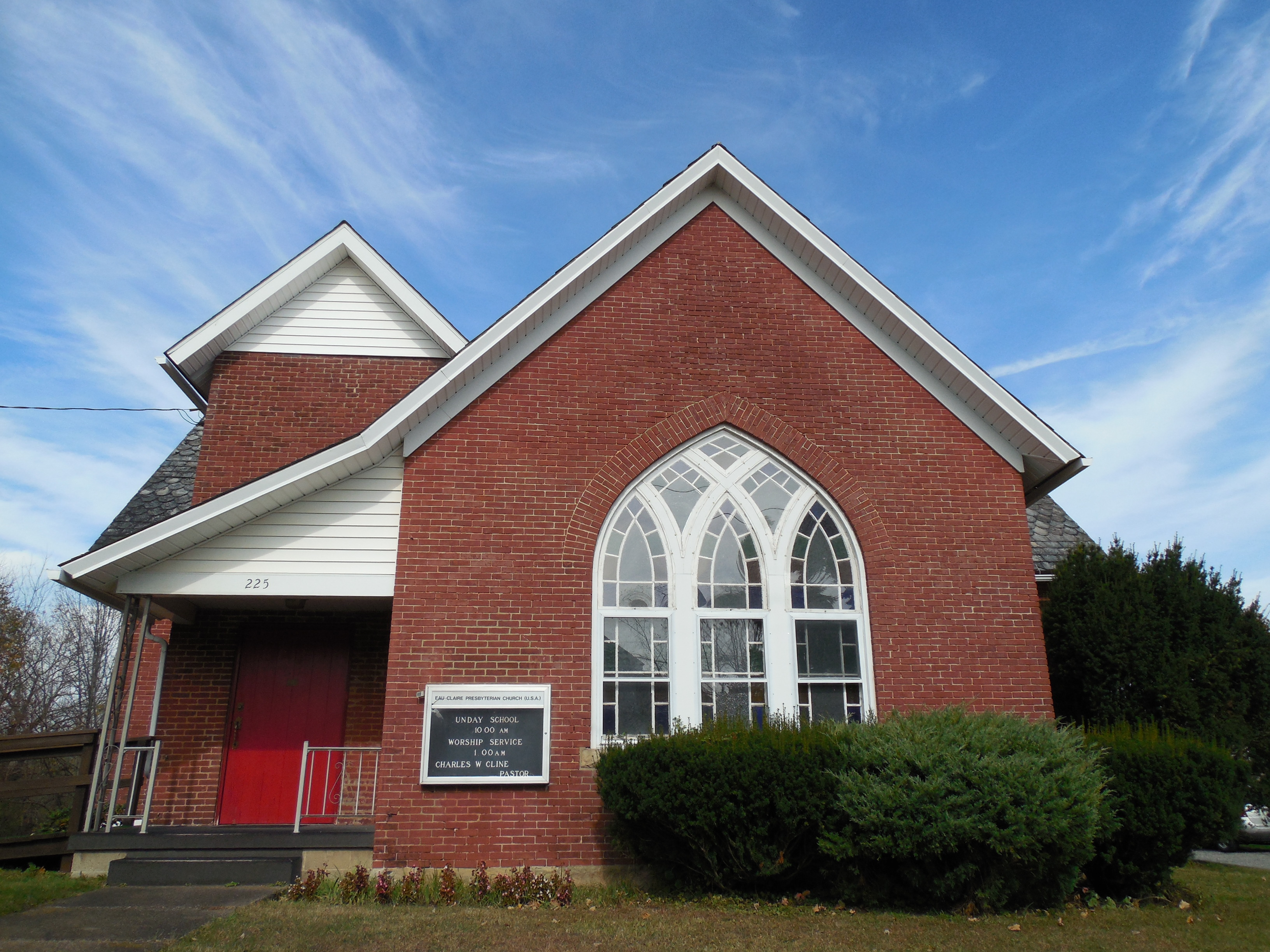
- Eau Claire Presbyterian Church

- Location of Eau Claire in Butler County, Pennsylvania.

- Location within Pennsylvania
- Coordinates: 41°08′07″N 79°47′52″W
- Country: United States
- State: Pennsylvania
- County: Butler
- Settled: 1848
- Incorporated: 1900

Government
  - Type: Borough Council

Area
  - Total: 1.27 sq mi (3.30 km^{2})
  - Land: 1.27 sq mi (3.30 km^{2})
  - Water: 0 sq mi (0.00 km^{2})

Population (2020)
  - Total: 307
  - Density: 240/sq mi (93/km^{2})
- Time zone: UTC-5 (Eastern (EST))
  - Summer (DST): UTC-4 (EDT)
- Zip code: 16030
- FIPS code: 42-22128

Eau Claire is a borough in Butler County, Pennsylvania, United States. As of the 2020 census, Eau Claire had a population of 307. The name means "Clear Water" in French, and is pronounced as the French pronunciation.

== Geography ==
Eau Claire is located in northern Butler County at 41°8′7″N 79°47′52″W (41.135335, −79.797914). It is bordered by the borough of Cherry Valley to the north. Pennsylvania Routes 38 and 58 intersect in the center of the borough. Route 38 leads north and east 7 miles (11 km) to Emlenton on the Allegheny River and south 22 miles (35 km) to Butler, the county seat, while Route 58 leads east 7 miles (11 km) to Foxburg on the Allegheny River and west 16 miles (26 km) to Grove City.

According to the United States Census Bureau, Eau Claire has a total area of 1.3 square miles (3.3 km^{2}), all land.

== Demographics ==
Historical population
Census	Pop.	Note	%±
1910	347		—
1920	337		−2.9%
1930	302		−10.4%
1940	349		15.6%
1950	403		15.5%
1960	374		−7.2%
1970	428		14.4%
1980	420		−1.9%
1990	371		−11.7%
2000	355		−4.3%
2010	316		−11.0%
2020	307		−2.8%

As of the 2000 census, there were 355 people, 135 households, and 105 families residing in the borough. The population density was 258.4 inhabitants per square mile (99.8/km^{2}). There were 143 housing units at an average density of 104.1 per square mile (40.2/km^{2}). The racial makeup of the borough was 99.44% White, 0.28% African American and 0.28% Asian.

There were 135 households, out of which 35.6% had children under the age of 18 living with them, 59.3% were married couples living together, 12.6% had a female householder with no husband present, and 22.2% were non-families. 17.8% of all households were made up of individuals, and 6.7% had someone living alone who was 65 years of age or older. The average household size was 2.63 and the average family size was 2.90.

In the borough the population was spread out, with 26.5% under the age of 18, 9.9% from 18 to 24, 32.7% from 25 to 44, 20.8% from 45 to 64, and 10.1% who were 65 years of age or older. The median age was 33 years. For every 100 females, there were 98.3 males. For every 100 females age 18 and over, there were 96.2 males.

The median income for a household in the borough was $31,181, and the median income for a family was $32,083. Males had a median income of $29,125 versus $19,500 for females. The per capita income for the borough was $14,383. About 16.1% of families and 15.3% of the population were below the poverty line, including 22.0% of those under age 18 and 18.5% of those age 65 or over.

== Education ==
It is in the Moniteau School District.
