= Emlenton Historic District =

Historic district in Pennsylvania, United States

- U.S. National Register of Historic Places
- U.S. Historic district
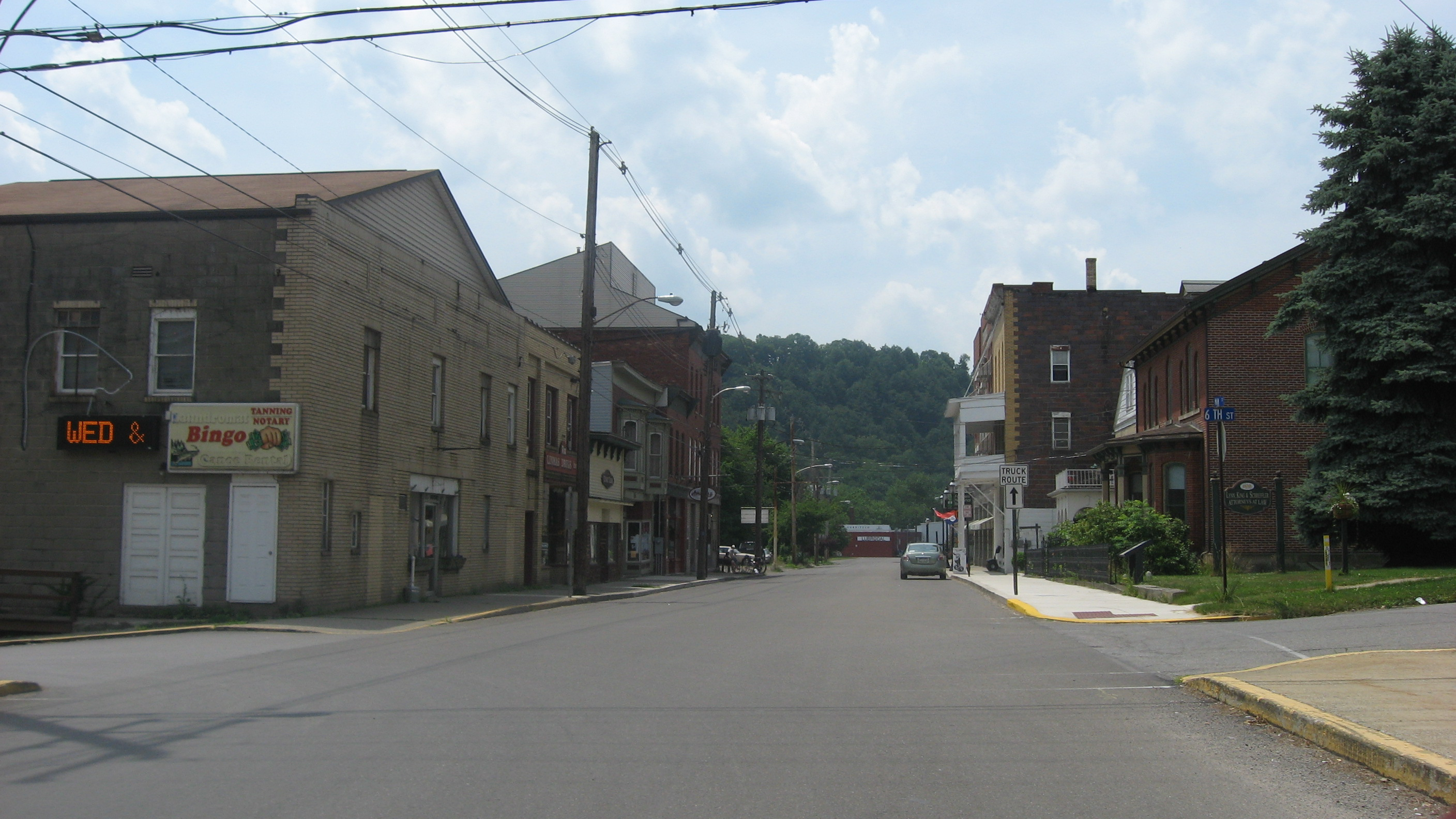
- Main Street downtown

- Location within Pennsylvania Location within the United States
- Location: Roughly bounded by Allegheny R., the borough limits, Kerr Ave., Hickory, and Center Sts., Emlenton, Pennsylvania
- Coordinates: 41°10′47″N 79°42′43″W
- Area: 180 acres (73 ha)
- Built: 1837
- Architect: Crosby, W. Holmes
- Architectural style: Italianate, Greek Revival, Gothic Revival
- MPS: Oil Industry Resources in Western Pennsylvania MPS
- NRHP reference No.: 97001256
- Added to NRHP: November 10, 1997

Emlenton Historic District is a national historic district located at Emlenton, Venango County, Pennsylvania. The district includes 317 contributing buildings, 57 contributing structures, and 1 contributing object in the central business district and surrounding residential areas of Emlenton. It includes commercial, residential, industrial, and institutional buildings. They are in a variety of popular architectural styles including Italianate, Greek Revival, and Gothic Revival.

Notable buildings include the Valley House Hotel (1837), Quaker State Oil Refining Complex, Harry Crawford birthplace (c. 1860), Farmers National Bank Building (1904), Criswell-Bishop Building (c. 1920), Crawford Memorial School (1928), St. John's Reformed Church (1869), St. John's Evangelical Lutheran Church (1886), Emlenton Presbyterian Church (1874), St. Michael's Roman Catholic Church (1870, 1930), and Emlenton Borough Building (1928). The contributing structures are mostly located at the Quaker State Oil Refining Complex and the contributing object is a World War I memorial.

The Emlenton Mill (1874) was lost to fire on February 6, 2015. At the time of the fire it housed an ice cream shop, a hostel for cyclists on the Allegheny River Trail, and a small museum. Several nearby houses were also damaged. Emlenton, a town of 648, has been trying to remake itself into a tourist destination.

The district was added to the National Register of Historic Places in 1997.
