= Interstate 80 in Pennsylvania =

Section of Interstate Highway in Pennsylvania, United States

Interstate 80
- Keystone Shortway; Z. H. Confair Memorial Highway
- I-80 highlighted in red

Route information
- Maintained by PennDOT and DRJTBC
- Length: 311.12 mi (500.70 km)
- NHS: Entire route

Major junctions
- West end: I-80 at the Ohio state line near Farrell
- I-376 / PA 760 near Sharon; US 19 near Mercer; I-79 near Mercer; Future I-99 / US 220 / PA 26 near Bellefonte; I-180 / PA 147 in Milton; I-81 near Hazleton; I-476 Toll / Penna Turnpike NE Extension / PA 940 near Hickory Run State Park; I-380 near Pocono Pines; PA 33 / PA 611 near Stroudsburg; US 209 in Stroudsburg
- East end: I-80 at the New Jersey state line in Delaware Water Gap

Location
- Country: United States
- State: Pennsylvania
- Counties: Mercer, Venango, Butler, Clarion, Jefferson, Clearfield, Centre, Clinton, Union, Northumberland, Montour, Columbia, Luzerne, Carbon, Monroe

Highway system
- Interstate Highway System; Main; Auxiliary; Suffixed; Business; Future; Pennsylvania State Route System; Interstate; US; State; Scenic; Legislative
← PA 79	→ PA 80

Interstate 80 (I-80) in the US state of Pennsylvania runs for 311.12 miles (500.70 km) across the central part of the state. It is designated as the Keystone Shortway and officially as the Z. H. Confair Memorial Highway. This route was built mainly along a completely new alignment, not paralleling any earlier US Routes, as a shortcut to the tolled Pennsylvania Turnpike to the south and New York State Thruway to the north. It does not serve any major cities in Pennsylvania and is mainly a cross-state route on the Ohio–New York City corridor. Most of I-80's path across the state goes through hilly and mountainous terrain, while the route passes through relatively flat areas toward the western part of the state.

I-80 serves many smaller cities in central to northern Pennsylvania, including Sharon, Clarion, DuBois, Bellefonte, Lock Haven, Milton, Bloomsburg, Hazleton, and Stroudsburg. It also passes close but never into four larger cities: State College, Williamsport, Wilkes-Barre, and Scranton; however, a connection to State College is provided by I-99, while Williamsport is accessible via I-180, and Scranton and Wilkes-Barre are accessible via I-81, I-476 and I-380.

== Route description ==
=== Western Pennsylvania ===
From the state of Ohio, I-80 enters the Western Pennsylvania area which encompasses Mercer, Venango, Butler, Clarion, Jefferson, and Clearfield counties. This segment crosses the Allegheny Plateau. In Mercer County, I-80 intersects I-376 (serving Pittsburgh International Airport and Downtown Pittsburgh) in Shenango Township and I-79 (serving Erie to the north and Pittsburgh to the south) in Findley Township. I-80 spends less than 3 miles (4.8 km) in Butler County, and has no exits in it. It crosses the Allegheny River on the Emlenton Bridge near Emlenton.

Jefferson County at milemarker 73 is known for Punxsutawney, the location of the famous groundhog Punxsutawney Phil who predicts the weather on Groundhog Day. In Clearfield County, I-80 passes by DuBois at milemarker 101, and crosses the Eastern Continental Divide at a shallow ridge just east of DuBois.

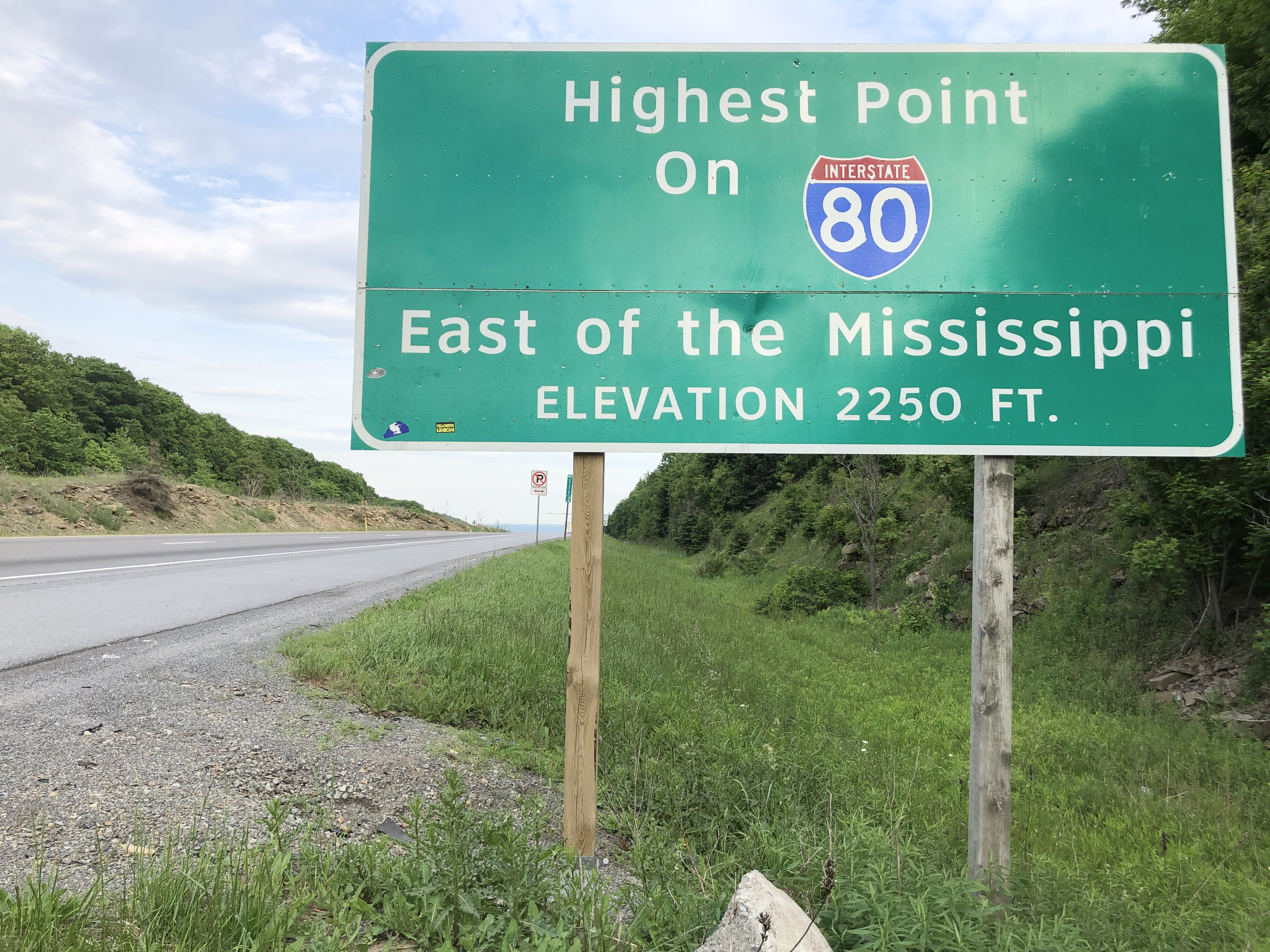
Sign noting the highest point on I-80 east of the Mississippi River located in Clearfield County

East of exit 111, in Moshannon State Forest, I-80 reaches its highest elevation east of the Mississippi River, 2,250 feet (690 m). A sign prominently displays this fact about the Interstate. It then descends to cross the West Branch Susquehanna River.

=== North-Central Pennsylvania ===
I-80 enters Centre County around milemarker 138. I-80 descends Allegheny Mountain into the Nittany Valley, intersecting Future I-99/U.S. Route 220 (US 220) at exit 161, the main connecting point to the Pennsylvania Turnpike (I-70/I-76), Pennsylvania State University, and State College. US 220 is concurrent between exits 161 and 178 where it heads toward Lock Haven, home to Lock Haven University of Pennsylvania.

I-80 then ascends Sugar Valley Mountain and then follows White Deer Creek down to the West Branch Susquehanna River, which I-80 crosses a second time. Around milemarker 191, Pennsylvania Route 880 (PA 880) follows a parallel alignment within the median between the eastbound and westbound lanes for a half-mile (0.80 km), an unusual arrangement in Pennsylvania. It is common to see horse-drawn carriages from the nearby Amish communities traveling this highway-within-a-highway.

At milemarker 199, I-80 approaches the Williamsport area in Lycoming County, where the venue of the Little League World Series is located, while passing through Union County. I-80 intersects US 15 at exit 210.

=== Northeastern Pennsylvania ===
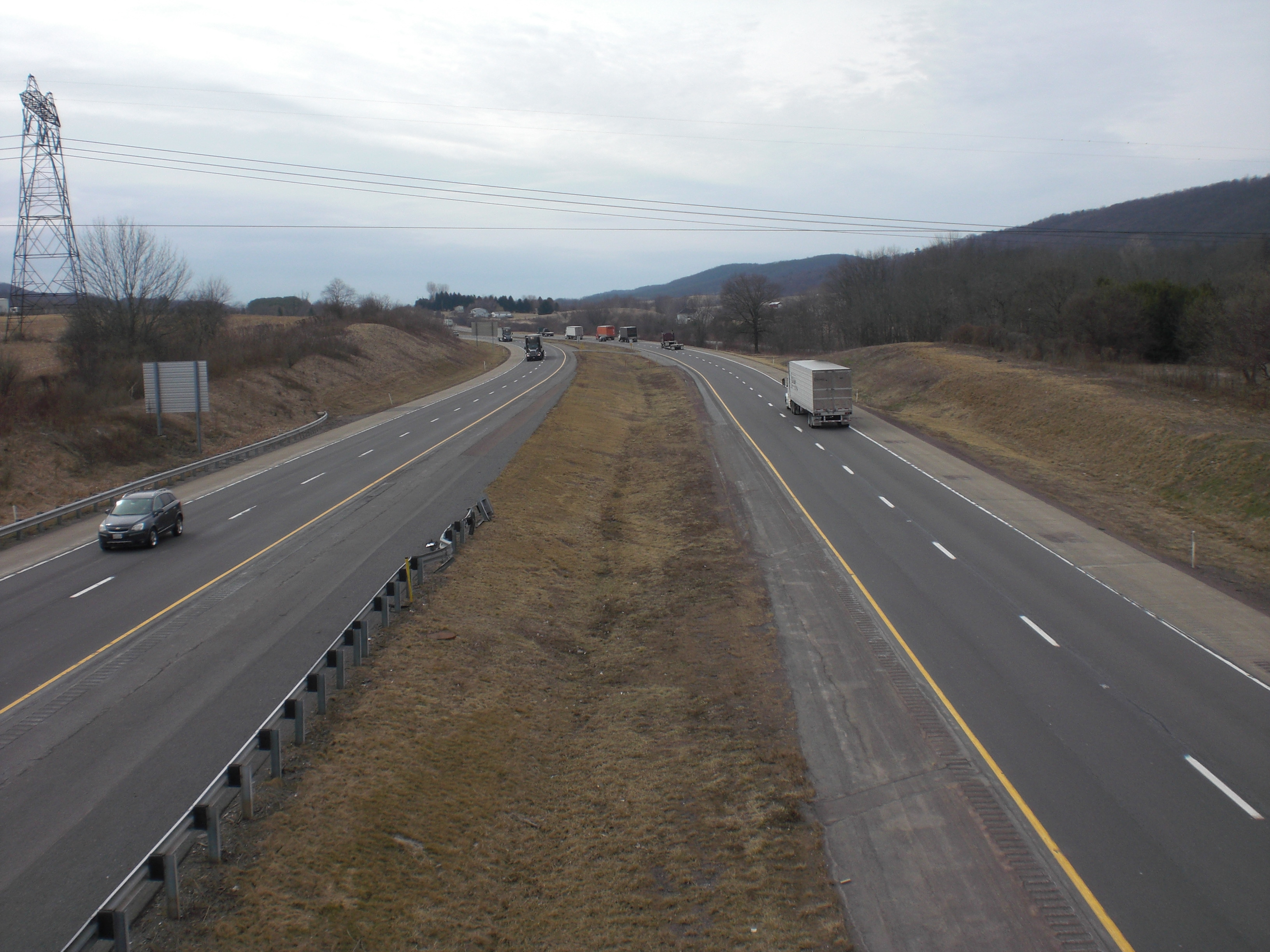
I-80 from an overpass in Hemlock Township, Columbia County

I-80 enters Northeastern Pennsylvania and proceeds from Northumberland County in the west to the Pennsylvania-New Jersey border in the east. I-80 intersects PA 147 at exit 212. In Montour County at milemarker 224, it approaches the Bloomsburg area, home to Bloomsburg University of Pennsylvania, where it crosses the North Branch Susquehanna River. At exit 260, a connection can be made via I-81 to Harrisburg to the south and Wilkes-Barre, Scranton and Syracuse, New York to the north.

The highway continues east into the Pocono Mountains region, which is home to ski areas including Camelback Mountain Resort and Blue Mountain Resort. I-80 intersects the Pennsylvania Turnpike Northeast Extension (I-476) at exit 277 in Carbon County for connections to Allentown and Philadelphia to the south and Wilkes-Barre and Scranton to the north. Exit 277 also serves PA 940 and Hickory Run State Park. Just east of I-476, I-80 crosses into Monroe County. Exit 284 connects to PA 115 near Blakeslee and Lake Harmony, and also provides access to Pocono Raceway. Exit 293 is an interchange with I-380 near Pocono Pines for a connection to I-84 to New England and Scranton toward the north. Between exits 293 and 298, there is a rest area on the eastbound side with public restrooms and picnic tables but no food or gas.

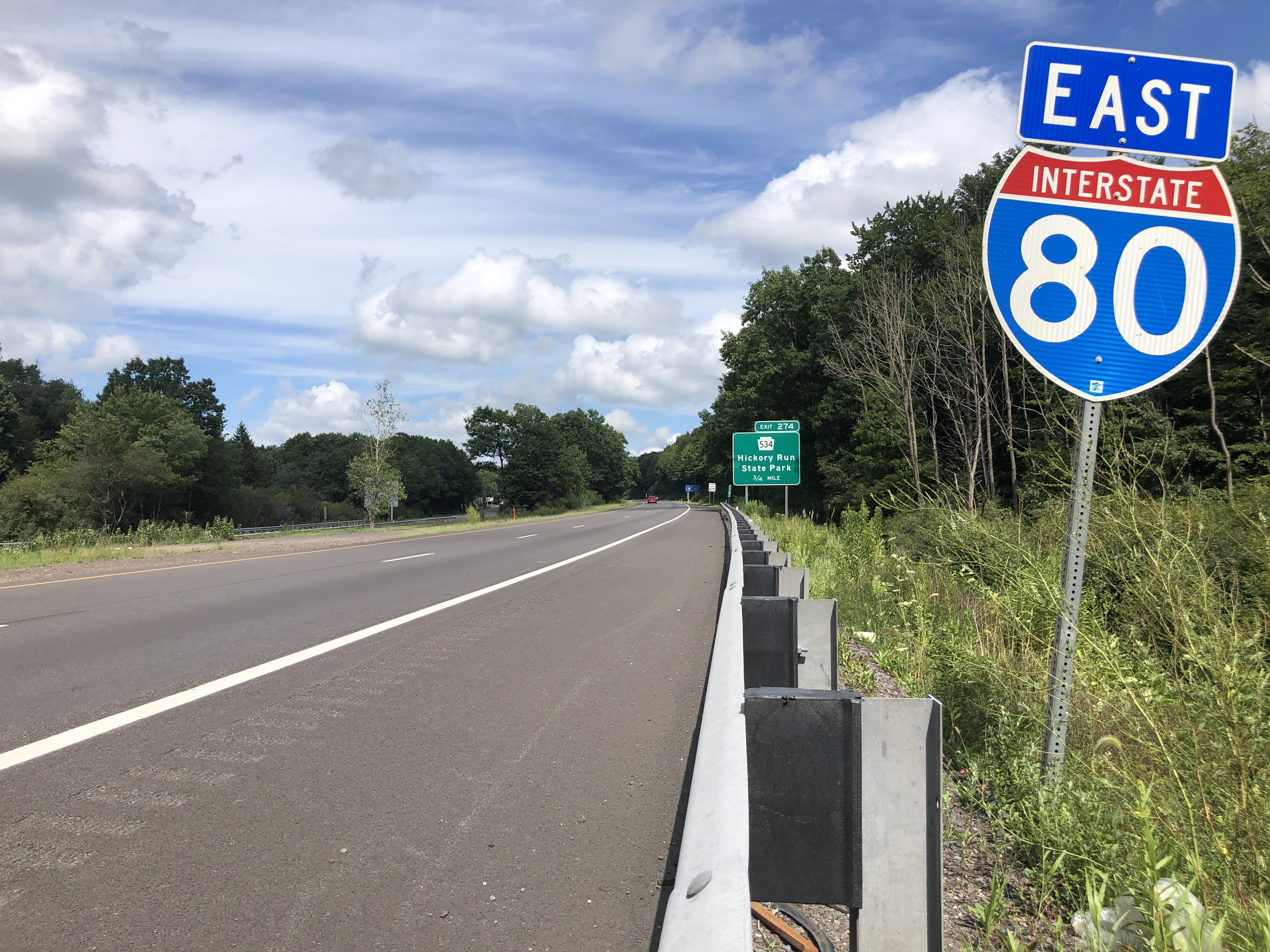
I-80 eastbound in East Side

Around exit 298, I-80 approaches the Stroudsburg and East Stroudsburg areas in the eastern Pocono Mountains, a more suburban and populated region home to East Stroudsburg University of Pennsylvania. Stroudsburg is also the county seat for Monroe County. PA 611 follows I-80 closely through the area between exits 298 and 310, acting as a local alternative. Exit 298 is only a westbound exit and eastbound entrance, connecting to PA 611 in Scotrun. Exit 299 serves PA 715 in Tannersville, as well as the Pocono Premium Outlets near by. Exit 302 on the eastbound side and exit 304 on the westbound side connect to PA 33 and US 209, which connect to Easton and Allentown toward the south. Exit 302 in both directions also serves PA 611 in Bartonsville. I-80 and US 209 are concurrent with each other through most of Stroudsburg and East Stroudsburg, between exits 304 and 309. Exit 303 is an only eastbound exit and westbound entrance that connects to PA 611 (signed as Ninth Street), serving Arlington Heights. Exits 305, 306, and 307 all serve downtown Stroudsburg, with exit 305 serving US 209 Business and exit 307 serving PA 611 and PA 191, the three main local thoroughfares through the Stroudsburg. Exit 308 serves downtown East Stroudsburg and East Stroudsburg University of Pennsylvania.

I-80 splits with US 209 at exit 309, which also serves PA 447. Shortly after at exit 310 (the easternmost interchange in Pennsylvania), PA 611 intersects I-80 for the last time before starting its southerly route down the Delaware River, gradually moving away from I-80. I-80 continues east into the Delaware Water Gap, entering the state of New Jersey via the Delaware Water Gap Toll Bridge, with eastbound signage pointing toward New York City.

== History ==
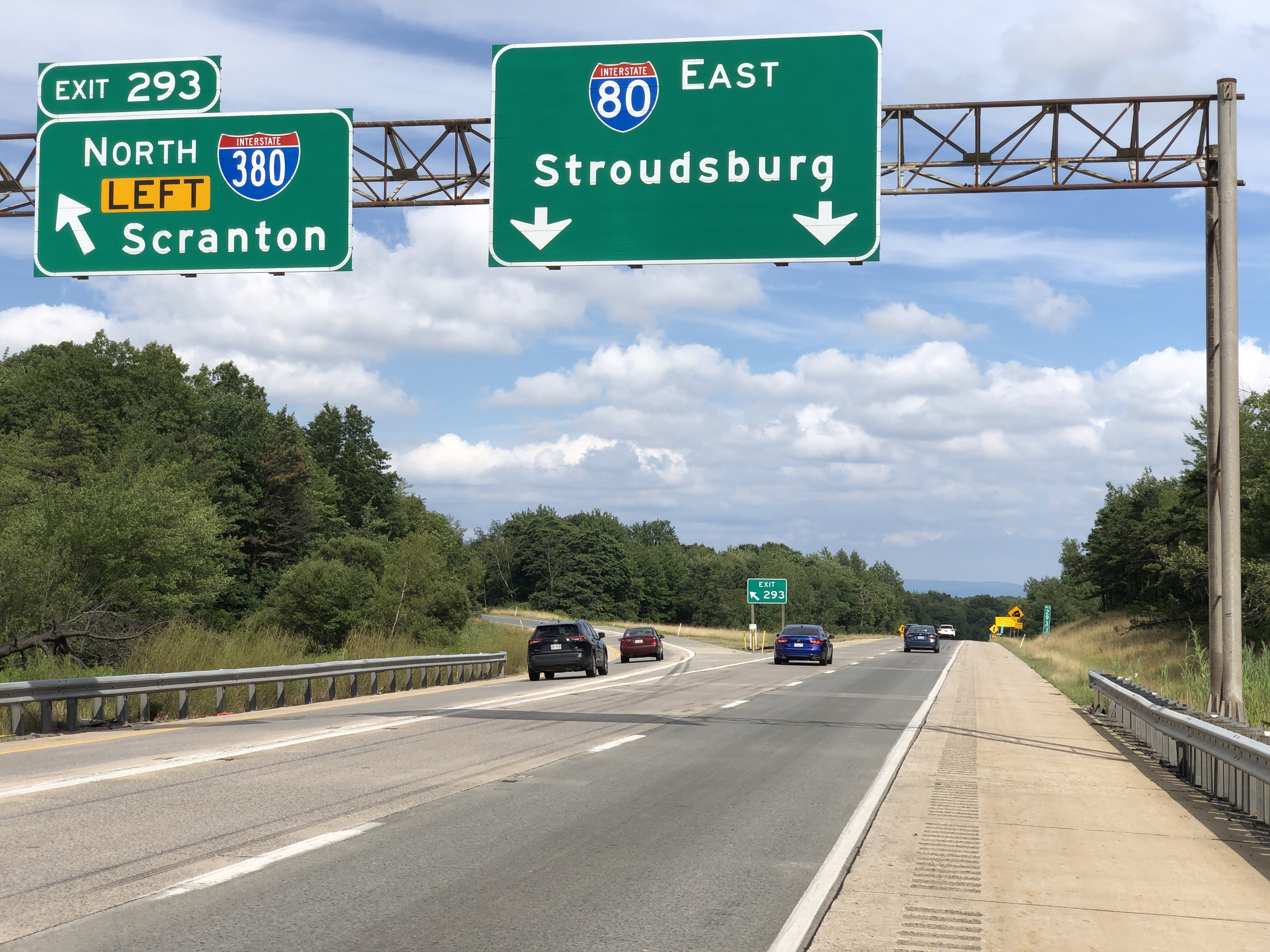
I-80 eastbound at I-380 exit near Pocono Pines

The corridor now served by I-80 was originally to be a branch of the Pennsylvania Turnpike from Sharon to Stroudsburg. Planning was shifted to the Pennsylvania Department of Highways in 1956 with the passage of the National Interstate and Defense Highways Act.

In early plans for the Interstate Highway System, the connection across Northern Pennsylvania would have paralleled US 6N and US 6 from what became I-90 near West Springfield east to Scranton. East of Scranton, I-84 was built parallel to US 6. From Scranton, a route went southeast along US 611 to the Stroudsburg area and then east along US 46 to near New York City.

On May 22, 1957, a request by Pennsylvania to move the corridor south was approved by the Federal Highway Administration (FHWA). (The Scranton–Stroudsburg connection was kept, and the new alignment merged with it west of Stroudsburg. However, when the initial numbers were assigned later that year, they were drawn on a 1947 map, and so the corridor across Northern Pennsylvania became part of I-84, while the Scranton–New York route became I-82. I-80 ran along the Pennsylvania Turnpike to Harrisburg, where it split into I-80S to Philadelphia and I-80N to New York. This was corrected the following year when the Keystone Shortway became part of I-80, the Pennsylvania Turnpike west of Harrisburg became I-80S (later I-76), and I-80N became I-78. I-84 was truncated to Scranton, and the Scranton–Stroudsburg connection became I-81E (later renumbered I-380).

The first section of present I-80 to open was the Delaware Water Gap Toll Bridge, opened December 16, 1953. This had been built as part of US 611 and connected back to its old alignment soon after crossing into Pennsylvania. Construction on the rest of I-80 began in 1959 and was completed in 1970.

Pennsylvania's Name Designation Act of 1984 designated I-80 as the Z. H. Confair Memorial Highway.

In 1993, exit 43 (now exit 284) of I-80, which serves the Pocono Raceway, was designated the Richard Petty Interchange in honor of the NASCAR driver that drove the #43 car.

By 2000, most of the road had been rebuilt to meet modern standards.

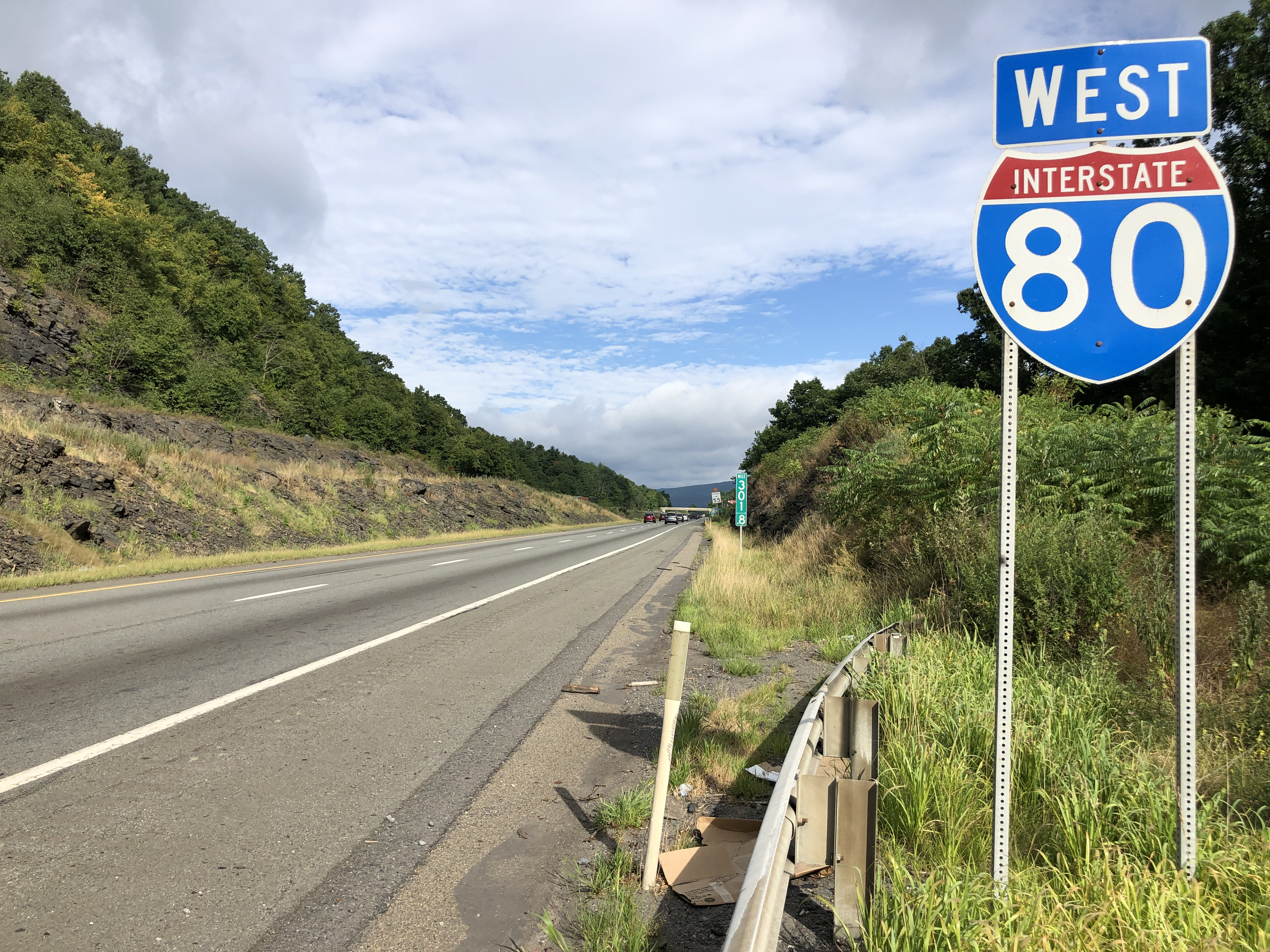
I-80 westbound past PA 33 in Bartonsville

In response to Act 44, which requires the Pennsylvania Turnpike Commission (PTC) to provide funding to PennDOT for transportation projects, in June 2007, the PTC proposed tolling I-80 as a means of raising revenue. It sought the permission to put tolls on the highway through an FHWA pilot program that allowed three states to place tolls on Interstates. Missouri and Virginia had already taken two of the spots. Under the plan, the PTC would assume all maintenance and toll-taking operations on I-80. The plan called for up to 10 toll plazas along the length of I-80 in Pennsylvania with a toll rate of $0.08 per mile ($0.050/km), which would have been comparable to the rate on the Pennsylvania Turnpike following a projected toll increase. Currently, the only toll on I-80 in Pennsylvania is for westbound traffic crossing the Delaware Water Gap Toll Bridge between Pennsylvania and New Jersey. On October 15, 2007, the lease for the PTC to toll I-80 was signed, and tolls were to be implemented by 2010. This plan faced opposition from Northeastern Pennsylvania politicians who feared tolls would hurt the economy in the region and who did not want their tolls going toward funding mass transit. Representatives John E. Peterson and Phil English proposed a federal transportation bill that would ban the tolling of I-80. The chief executive officer of the PTC promised that the tolls would be used on highway projects in Pennsylvania and not on mass transit. On December 12, 2007, the FHWA rejected the plan and returned Pennsylvania's application for tolling I-80 with "fourteen items identified as insufficient by the FHWA", including a statement that revenue from tolls on I-80 was proposed to be used for purposes other than maintenance of I-80, contrary to the FHWA program requirements. On September 11, 2008, the FHWA rejected Pennsylvania's application to toll I-80 a second time, stating: "There is simply no evidence that the lease payments [by the Turnpike Authority] are related to the actual costs of acquiring an interest in the facility." On April 6, 2010, the FHWA rejected the application for the third time, with the statement: "We based today's decision on what is allowable under federal law. The Interstate System Reconstruction and Rehabilitation Pilot Program requires that revenue from tolls be used only to improve the tolled facility, in this case I-80, and not be directed toward other state funding needs or transportation projects elsewhere in the state, as is the case in the Pennsylvania application."

I-80 westbound approaching the PA 611 interchange in Delaware Water Gap

On March 7, 2011, the supporting wall on the eastbound I-80 bridge over Sullivan Trail in Tannersville collapsed from snow and rain. As a result, eastbound I-80 was reduced to one lane and Sullivan Trail was closed.

On July 10, 2014, a criminal rock throwing incident known as the I-80 rock throwing took place along I-80 in Union County, critically injuring and permanently disfiguring a passenger. Four local youths were responsible.

On December 18, 2020, a snow squall caused an accident on this highway that generated a massive pileup of 66 vehicles (mainly trucks). One person was killed on the scene and at least 43 others were injured. One other person later died from injuries. Eastbound lanes in Clinton County were closed due to the accident and Governor Tom Wolf and the Pennsylvania Department of Transportation (PennDOT) held a press conference discussing the accident.

== Future ==
=== I-99 interchange ===
PennDOT has plans to build a high-speed interchange connecting I-99 to I-80 near Bellefonte. The new interchange will eliminate local access between PA 26 (Jacksonville Road) and I-80, which will be provided by a new exit two miles (3.2 km) to the east. The first phase of the project built the local access interchange between PA 26 and I-80. Construction on the local access interchange began on July 27, 2020. The local access interchange was opened to traffic on November 10, 2022, with a ribbon-cutting ceremony held. The local access interchange between PA 26 and I-80 was funded in part by a $35-million federal grant, with a total estimated cost of $52 million. The second phase of the project will make improvements to Jacksonville Road between the new interchange and the junction between I-80, and the third phase will build the high-speed interchange between I-80 and I-99. Bidding on the second and third phases was planned to begin in March 2022, with the improvements to Jacksonville Road to be finished by December 2023 and the high-speed interchange to be completed by December 2025. However, the bids for the other phases have not been released as of May 2023.

=== Stroudsburg widening ===
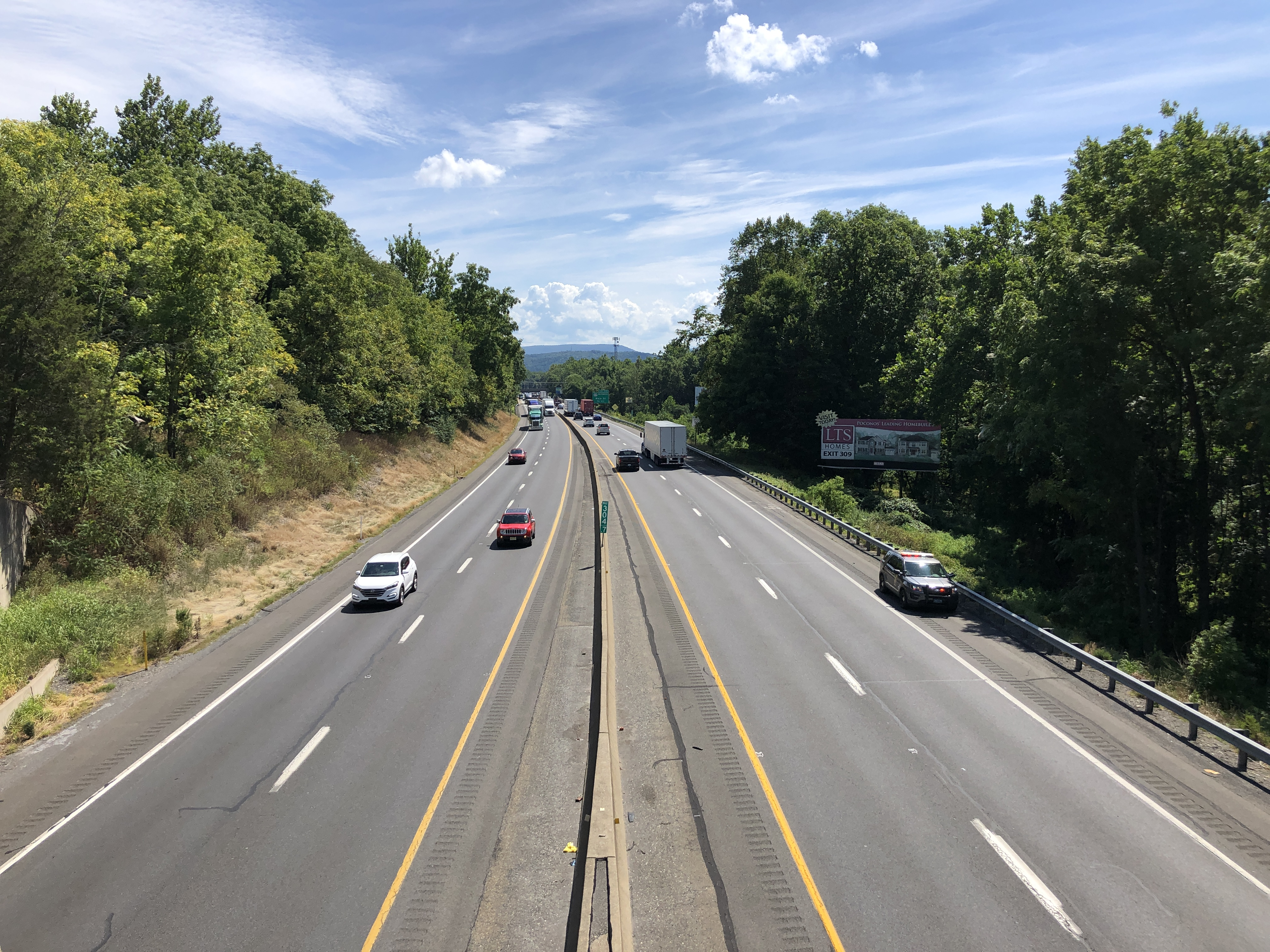
I-80 eastbound in Stroud Township

Due to increasing suburbanization and a rapidly increasing population in the Stroudsburg area, I-80 is to be widened to three lanes in each direction from its current two between I-380 (exit 293) in Pocono Pines and the Delaware Water Gap Bridge (New Jersey state line). The project had a completion date of 2023, has been approved by PennDOT and the US Department of Transportation (USDOT), and is in the final design phase. The project will widen I-80 to three lanes in each direction between exit 298 and exit 308, as well as reconstruct all interchanges included in this part of the project. This section of road was built in the 1950s and is one of the oldest stretches of Interstate Highway in the US, starting out as a simple bypass of Stroudsburg for US 209 before becoming part of I-80. It has one of the highest accident rates in Pennsylvania due to major issues such as most entrances not having acceleration lanes, multiple overpasses that are structurally deficient, and shoulders that are as narrow as a tenth the required length for Interstate Highways. Exits 304 and 305 on the westbound side are close together that they are only a half of the length apart required between exits, according to Interstate standards. Exits 298, 303, and 306 all do not provide full access. I-80 is a designated route so that the lanes have to be open during construction. In addition, this stretch of highway has large local usage, with 48 percent of drivers that enter at exit 307 getting off at either exit 306, 305, or 304 so most of the current connections must be preserved to prevent local opposition.

All of the details of the project include widening I-80 to three lanes in each direction between exit 298 and exit 308 and rebuilding exits 298, 303, 306, 307, and 308. Exits 307 and 308 will both be reconstructed, and no minor improvements allowed.

== Exit list ==
County	Location	mi	km	Old exit	New exit	Destinations	Notes
Mercer	Shenango Township	0.00	0.00	–	–	I-80 west – Youngstown	Continuation into Ohio
Mercer	Shenango Township	4.00	6.44	1	4	I-376 east / PA 760 north to PA 18 – New Castle, Sharon, Hermitage	Split into exits 4A (east) and 4B (south); western terminus and exits 1A-B on I-376; southern terminus of PA 760; former PA 60
Mercer	East Lackawannock Township	14.90	23.98	2	15	US 19 – Mercer	Access to Thiel College and Westminster College
Mercer	Findley Township	19.10	30.74	–	19	I-79 – Pittsburgh, Erie	Split into exits 19A (south) and 19B (north); exit 116 on I-79
Mercer	Worth Township	23.70	38.14	3A	24	PA 173 – Grove City, Sandy Lake	Access to Grove City College
Venango	Barkeyville	28.90	46.51	3	29	PA 8 – Franklin, Oil City, Barkeyville	Access to Butler
Venango	Clinton Township	34.70	55.84	4	35	PA 308 – Clintonville	
Venango	Scrubgrass Township	41.90	67.43	5	42	PA 38 – Emlenton	
Butler	No major junctions						
Allegheny River		44.30	71.29	Emlenton Bridge			
Clarion	Richland Township	45.70	73.55	6	45	PA 478 – Emlenton, St. Petersburg	Westbound ramps are via PA 38 / PA 208; access to Foxburg
Clarion	Beaver Township	53.50	86.10	7	53	To PA 338 – Knox	Access via Canoe Ripple Road
Clarion	Paint Township	60.10	96.72	8	60	PA 66 north – Shippenville	West end of concurrency with PA 66; access to Cook Forest State Park and Allegheny National Forest
Clarion	Monroe Township	61.90	99.62	9	62	PA 68 – Clarion	Access to Clarion University
Clarion	Clarion Township	64.50	103.80	10	64	PA 66 south – Clarion, New Bethlehem	East end of concurrency with PA 66; access to Clarion University
Clarion	Clarion Township	70.30	113.14	11	70	US 322 – Strattanville	
Jefferson	Union Township	72.90	117.32	12	73	PA 949 – Corsica	
Jefferson	Brookville	78.30	126.01	13	78	PA 36 / PA 28 Truck south – Sigel, Brookville	West end of concurrency with PA 28 Truck; access to Cook Forest State Park and Punxsutawney
Jefferson	Pine Creek Township	81.10	130.52	14	81	PA 28 – Hazen PA 36 / PA 28 Truck ends	East end of concurrency with PA 28 Truck
Jefferson	Winslow Township	86.40	139.05	15	86	Reynoldsville	Access via Fuller Road
Jefferson	Winslow Township	90.60	145.81	–	90	PA 830 east – DuBois Regional Airport	Western terminus of PA 830
Clearfield	Sandy Township	96.40	155.14	16	97	US 219 – DuBois, Brockway	Access to Allegheny National Forest
Clearfield	Sandy Township	100.90	162.38	17	101	PA 255 – DuBois, Penfield	
Clearfield	Pine Township	110.40	177.67	18	111	PA 153 – Clearfield, Penfield	Clearfield signed eastbound; Penfield signed westbound
Clearfield	Lawrence Township	119.40	192.16	19	120	PA 879 – Clearfield, Shawville	
Clearfield	Bradford Township	122.70	197.47	20	123	PA 970 – Woodland, Shawville	Shawville signed westbound
Clearfield	Cooper Township	132.60	213.40	21	133	PA 53 – Kylertown, Philipsburg	Access to Black Moshannon State Park
Centre	Snow Shoe	147.00	236.57	22	147	To PA 144 – Snow Shoe	Access via local roads
Centre	Boggs Township	157.40	253.31	23	158	PA 150 (US 220 Alt. south) – Milesburg	West end of concurrency with US 220 Alt.; access to Bald Eagle State Park and Black Moshannon State Park
Centre	Spring Township	160.20	257.82	24	161	Future I-99 south / US 220 south / PA 26 – Bellefonte US 220 Alt. ends	Eastern terminus of US 220 Alt.; west end of concurrency with Future I-99/US 220; access to State College and Penn State University
Centre	Marion Township	163.4	263.0	–	163	To PA 26 north – Jacksonville, Howard	Opened on November 10, 2022
Clinton	Porter Township	172.70	277.93	25	173	PA 64 – Lamar	
Clinton	Lamar Township	177.50	285.66	26	178	Future I-99 north / US 220 north – Lock Haven	East end of concurrency with Future I-99/US 220; access to Williamsport and Lock Haven University
Clinton	Greene Township	185.20	298.05	27	185	PA 477 – Loganton	Access to R. B. Winter State Park
Clinton	Greene Township	191.90	308.83	28	192	To PA 880 – Jersey Shore	Access via East Valley Road
Union	West Buffalo Township	198.90	320.10	29	199	Mile Run	Access via Mile Run Road; access to Bald Eagle State Forest
Union	White Deer Township	209.70	337.48	30	210	US 15 – Lewisburg, Williamsport	Signed as exits 210A (south) and 210B (north); access to Sunbury, Bucknell University, Reptiland, and Little League Museum
Northumberland	Milton	211.40	340.22	31	212	I-180 west / PA 147 south – Williamsport, Milton	Signed as exits 212A (south) and 212B (west); Eastern terminus of I-180, northern terminus of PA 147
Northumberland	East Chillisquaque Township	214.80	345.69	32	215	PA 254 – Limestoneville	
Montour	Valley Township	223.50	359.69	33	224	PA 54 – Danville	Access to Shamokin, Mount Carmel, and Sunbury
Columbia	Hemlock Township	231.70	372.89	34	232	PA 42 – Buckhorn	
Columbia	Bloomsburg	235.30	378.68	35	236	PA 487 – Lightstreet, Bloomsburg	Signed as exits 236A (north) and 236B (south) westbound; access to Bloomsburg University
Columbia	South Centre Township	240.20	386.56	36	241	US 11 – Lime Ridge, Berwick	Signed as exits 241A (south) and 241B (north) eastbound
Columbia	Main Township	241.40	388.50	37	242	PA 339 – Mifflinville, Mainville	
Luzerne	Sugarloaf Township	255.50	411.19	38	256	PA 93 – Nescopeck, Conyngham	Access to Penn State Hazleton
Luzerne	Butler Township	259.20	417.14	–	260	I-81 to I-84 – Harrisburg, Wilkes-Barre, New England	Split into exits 260A (south) and 260B (north); exit 151 on I-81; I-84 and New England signed eastbound
Luzerne	Butler Township	262.10	421.81	39	262	PA 309 – Mountain Top, Hazleton	Access to Nescopeck State Park and Eckley Miners' Village
Luzerne	White Haven	273.00	439.35	40	273	PA 940 / PA 437 – White Haven, Freeland	
Carbon	Kidder Township	274.50	441.76	41	274	PA 534 – Hickory Run State Park	
Carbon	Kidder Township	277.20	446.11	42	277	I-476 Toll / Penna Turnpike NE Extension / PA 940 – Wilkes-Barre, Allentown	Exit 95 (Pocono) on I-476 / Penna Turnpike NE Extension; access to Lake Harmony
Monroe	Blakeslee	284.00	457.05	43	284	PA 115 – Blakeslee	Access to Wilkes-Barre, Jack Frost–Big Boulder Ski Resort, and Pocono Raceway
Monroe	Pocono Pines	293.60	472.50	–	293	I-380 north – Scranton	Southern terminus and exit 1 on I-380; access to Kalahari Resort
Monroe	Scotrun	298.00	479.58	44	298	PA 611 – Scotrun	Westbound exit and eastbound entrance; access to Mount Pocono and Camelback Mountain Resort
Monroe	Tannersville	298.90	481.03	45	299	PA 715 – Tannersville	Access to Pocono Premium Outlets, Camelback Mountain Resort, and Big Pocono State Park
Monroe	Bartonsville	302.80	487.31	46	302	PA 33 south / PA 611 to US 209 – Snydersville, Bartonsville	No westbound access to PA 33; northern terminus of PA 33; signed as exits 302A (PA 33) and 302B (PA 611) eastbound
Monroe	Arlington Heights	304.90	490.69	47	303	Ninth Street (PA 611)	Eastbound exit and westbound entrance
Monroe	Stroudsburg	305.50	491.65	46A	304	US 209 south to PA 33 south – Snydersville	Westbound exit and eastbound entrance; western end of concurrency with US 209; access to Lehighton and Bethlehem
Monroe	Stroudsburg	305.60	491.82	48	305	US 209 Bus. (Main Street)	
Monroe	Stroudsburg	306.00	492.46	49	306	Dreher Avenue	Westbound exit and eastbound entrance
Monroe	Stroudsburg	307.00	494.07	50	307	PA 611 (Park Avenue) to PA 191	Eastbound exit and entrance
Monroe	Stroudsburg	307.00	494.07	50	307	PA 191 (Broad Street) to PA 611	Westbound exit and entrance
Monroe	East Stroudsburg	308.00	495.68	51	308	East Stroudsburg	Access via Prospect Street; access to East Stroudsburg University
Monroe	East Stroudsburg	309.50	498.09	52	309	US 209 north / PA 447 north – Marshalls Creek	Eastern end of concurrency with US 209; access to Shawnee Mountain Ski Area and Bushkill Falls
Monroe	Delaware Water Gap	310.50	499.70	53	310	PA 611 – Delaware Water Gap, Welcome Center	Access via Foxtown Hill Road
Delaware River		311.07	500.62	Delaware Water Gap Toll Bridge (westbound toll)			
Delaware River		311.07	500.62	–	–	I-80 east – New Jersey, New York City	Continuation into New Jersey
1.000 mi = 1.609 km; 1.000 km = 0.621 mi: Concurrency terminus; Electronic toll collection; Incomplete access

== See also ==
Interstate 80
Previous state: Ohio	Pennsylvania	Next state: New Jersey
