= St. Petersburg, Pennsylvania =

Borough in Pennsylvania, US

- Borough
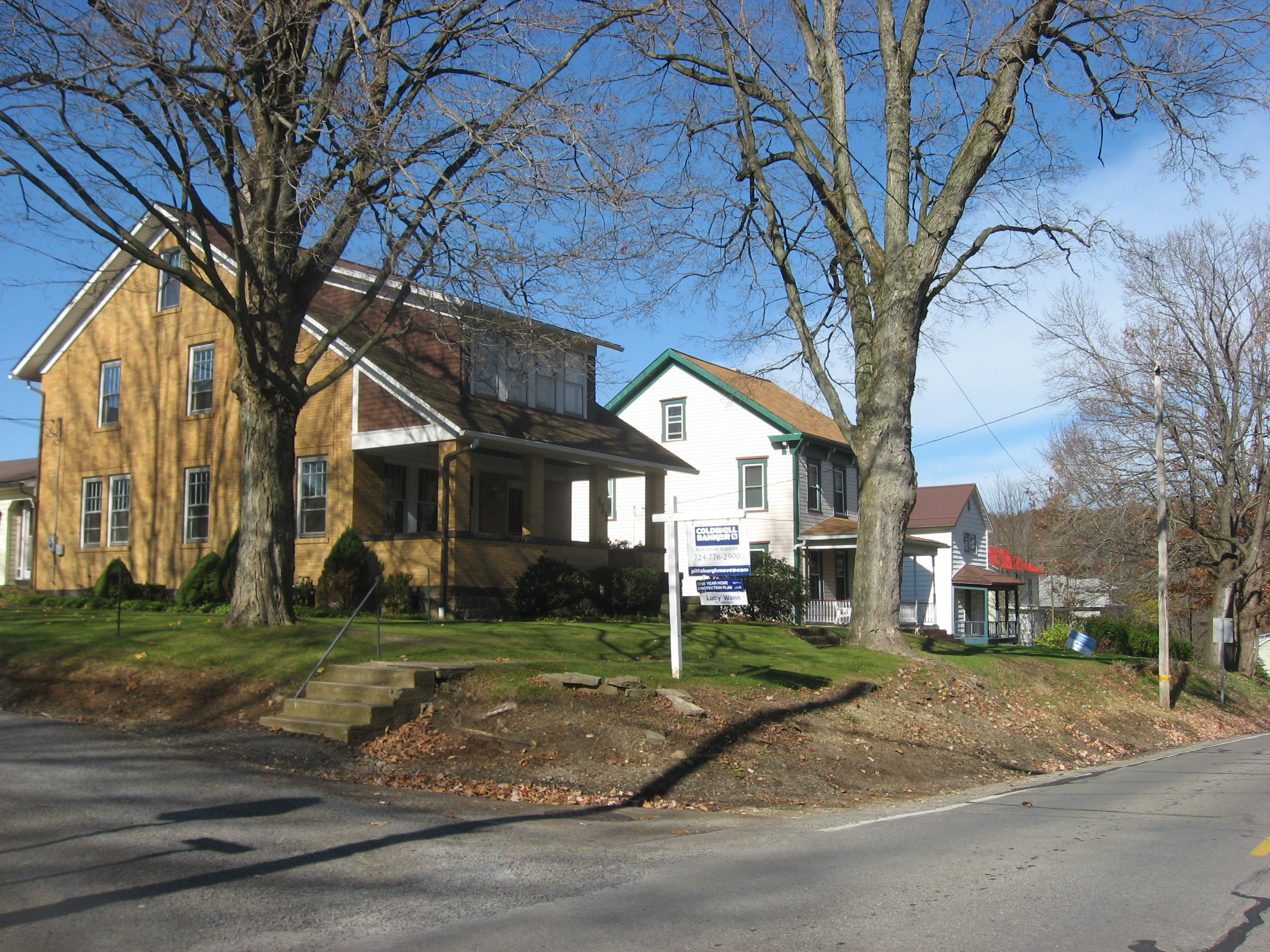
- Houses on Main Street

- Location of St. Petersburg in Clarion County, Pennsylvania.

- Map showing Clarion County in Pennsylvania

- Location within Pennsylvania
- Coordinates: 41°09′39″N 79°39′14″W
- Country: United States
- State: Pennsylvania
- County: Clarion

Government
  - Type: Borough Council

Area
  - Total: 0.32 sq mi (0.83 km^{2})
  - Land: 0.32 sq mi (0.83 km^{2})
  - Water: 0 sq mi (0.00 km^{2})
- Elevation: 1,390 ft (420 m)

Population (2020)
  - Total: 336
  - Density: 1,053.3/sq mi (406.68/km^{2})
- Time zone: UTC-5 (Eastern (EST))
  - Summer (DST): UTC-4 (EDT)
- ZIP code: 16054
- FIPS code: 42-67384
- Website: http://www.stpetersburgpa.com/

St. Petersburg is a borough in Clarion County, Pennsylvania, United States. The population was 338 at the 2020 census.

== Geography ==
St. Petersburg is located in western Clarion County at 41°09′39″N 79°39′14″W. Pennsylvania Route 58 passes through the borough, leading 2 miles (3 km) southwest to Foxburg on the Allegheny River and east 7 miles (11 km) to Callensburg on the Clarion River. Pennsylvania Route 478 leads northwest 2 miles (3 km) to Interstate 80 east of Emlenton.

According to the United States Census Bureau, St. Petersburg has a total area of 0.32 square miles (0.83 km^{2}), all land.

== Demographics ==
Historical population
Census	Pop.	Note	%±
1880	1,044		—
1890	655		−37.3%
1900	482		−26.4%
1910	453		−6.0%
1920	454		0.2%
1930	487		7.3%
1940	510		4.7%
1950	451		−11.6%
1960	417		−7.5%
1970	416		−0.2%
1980	452		8.7%
1990	349		−22.8%
2000	405		16.0%
2010	400		−1.2%
2020	336		−16.0%
2021 (est.)	337	▲	0.3%
U.S. Decennial Census

As of the census of 2000, there were 405 people, 164 households, and 115 families residing in the borough. The population density was 1,189.8 inhabitants per square mile (459.4/km^{2}). There were 168 housing units at an average density of 493.6 per square mile (190.6/km^{2}). The racial makeup of the borough was 99.26% White, 0.25% from other races, and 0.49% from two or more races. Hispanic or Latino of any race were 0.49% of the population.

There were 164 households, out of which 31.7% had children under the age of 18 living with them, 55.5% were married couples living together, 10.4% had a female householder with no husband present, and 29.3% were non-families. 27.4% of all households were made up of individuals, and 11.6% had someone living alone who was 65 years of age or older. The average household size was 2.47 and the average family size was 2.97.

In the borough the population was spread out, with 26.9% under the age of 18, 6.9% from 18 to 24, 27.4% from 25 to 44, 25.9% from 45 to 64, and 12.8% who were 65 years of age or older. The median age was 38 years. For every 100 females there were 108.8 males. For every 100 females age 18 and over, there were 101.4 males.

The median income for a household in the borough was $30,083, and the median income for a family was $33,333. Males had a median income of $30,000 versus $16,875 for females. The per capita income for the borough was $14,703. About 8.7% of families and 11.0% of the population were below the poverty line, including 11.8% of those under age 18 and 9.2% of those age 65 or over.

== Notable people ==
St. Petersburg is the birthplace of silent film actress and thelemite Jane Wolfe (1875–1958). It was also the longtime home of author Randall Silvis.
