= Scotrun, Pennsylvania =

Unincorporated community in Pennsylvania, US

- Unincorporated community
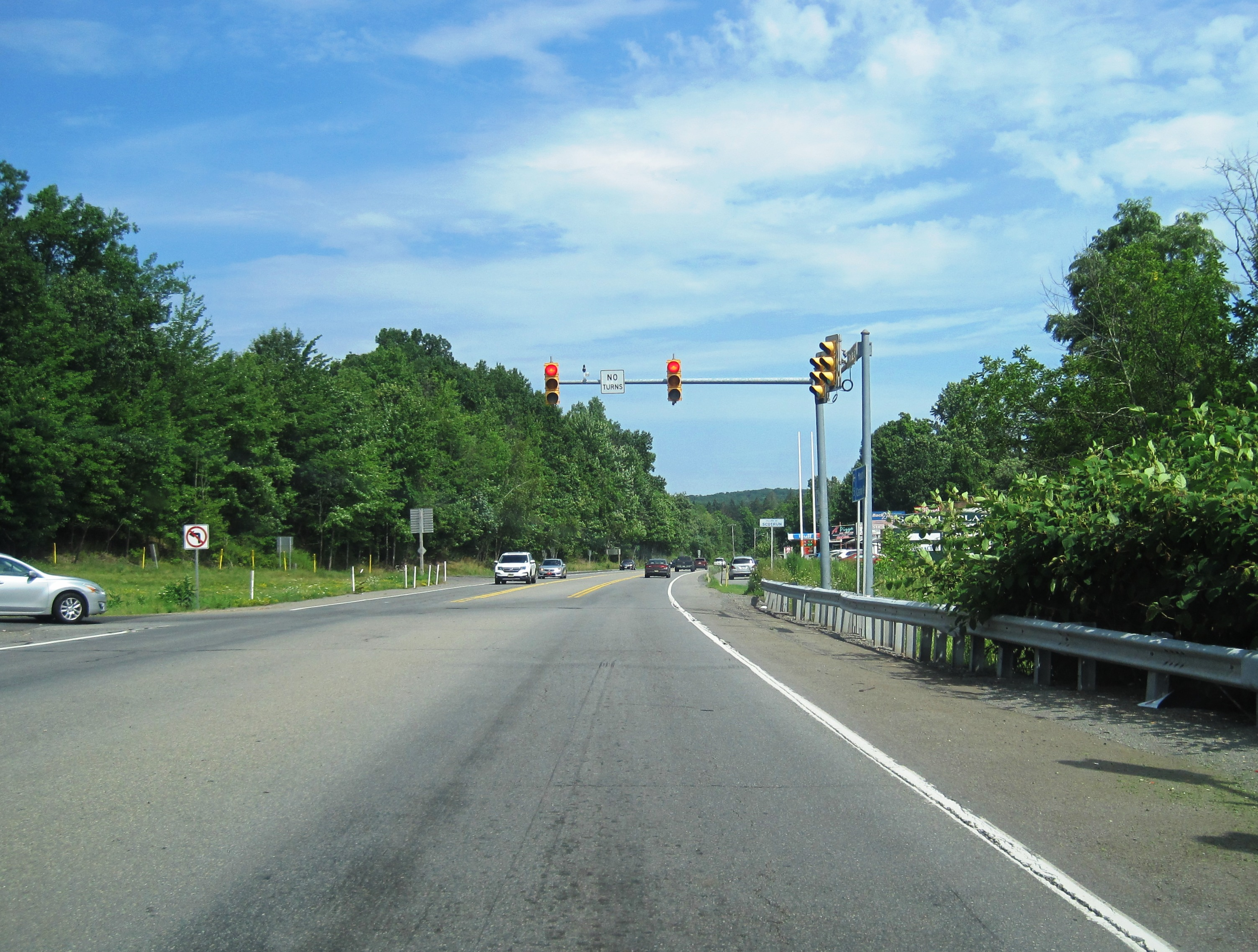
- Southerly entrance to Scotrun along PA 611

- Location within Pennsylvania Location within the United States
- Coordinates: 41°3′57″N 75°19′12″W
- Country: United States
- State: Pennsylvania
- County: Monroe
- Township: Pocono
- Elevation: 1,033 ft (315 m)
- Time zone: UTC-5 (Eastern (EST))
  - Summer (DST): UTC-4 (EDT)
- ZIP code: 18355
- Area codes: 570 and 272
- GNIS feature ID: 1187158

Scotrun is an unincorporated community in Pocono Township in Monroe County, Pennsylvania, United States. It is located in the Pocono Mountains along Pennsylvania Route 611, north of Tannersville and south of Mount Pocono. Popular attractions in Scotrun include the Great Wolf Lodge and the Four Seasons Campground.
