= Richey Run =

Stream in Pennsylvania, U.S.

Coordinates: 41°10′34″N 79°42′00″W

Richey Run is a stream in the U.S. state of Pennsylvania. It is a tributary of the Allegheny River.

A variant name is "Richies Run". The stream was named after the family of James Ritchey, a pioneer settler.

== See also ==
- List of rivers in Pennsylvania
- List of rivers in the United States
- List of canals in the United States
