= Richland Township, Clarion County, Pennsylvania =

Township in Pennsylvania, US

Coordinates: 41°10′25″N 79°38′17″W

- Township
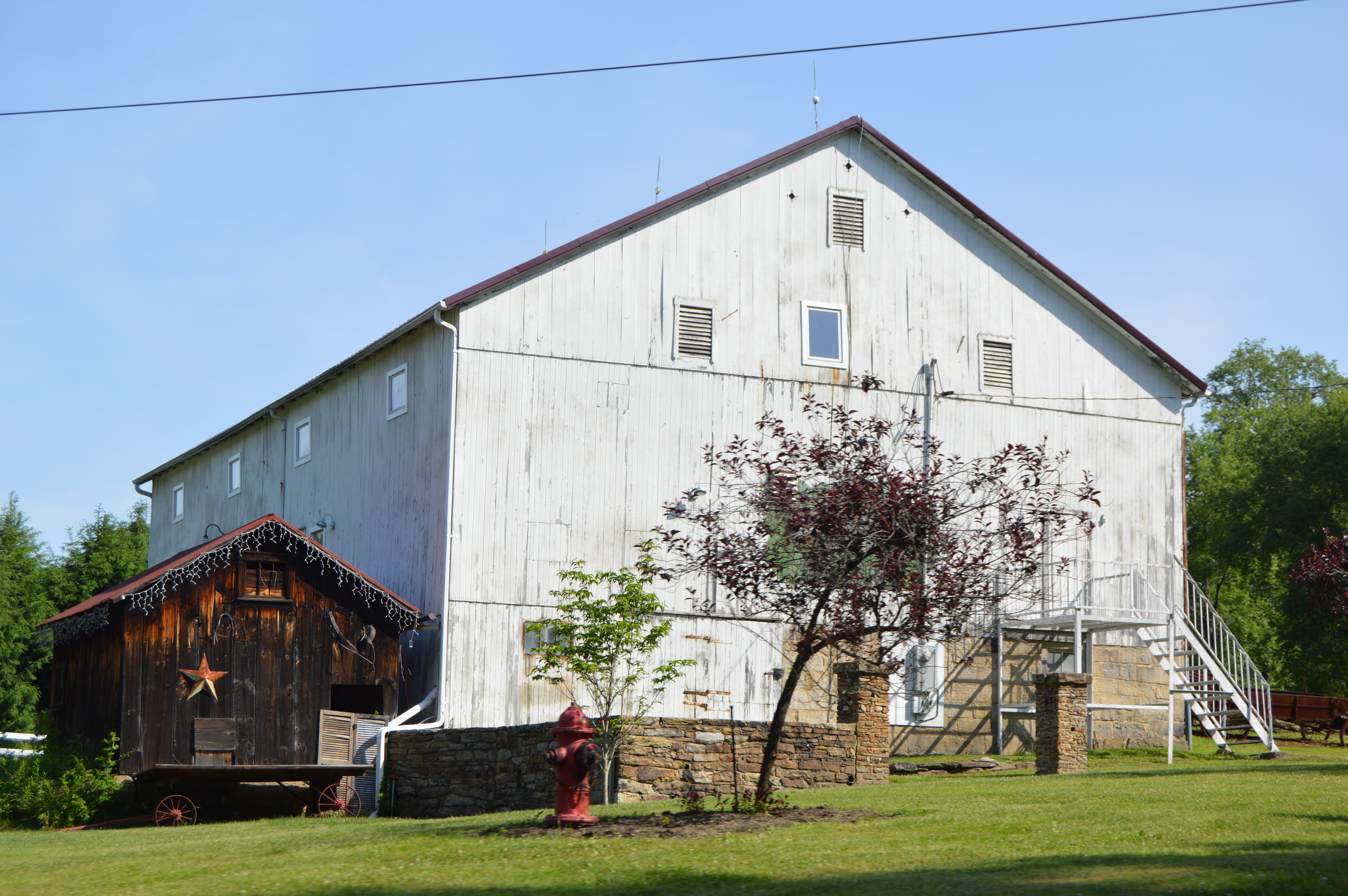
- Barn along Pennsylvania Route 368 west of St. Petersburg

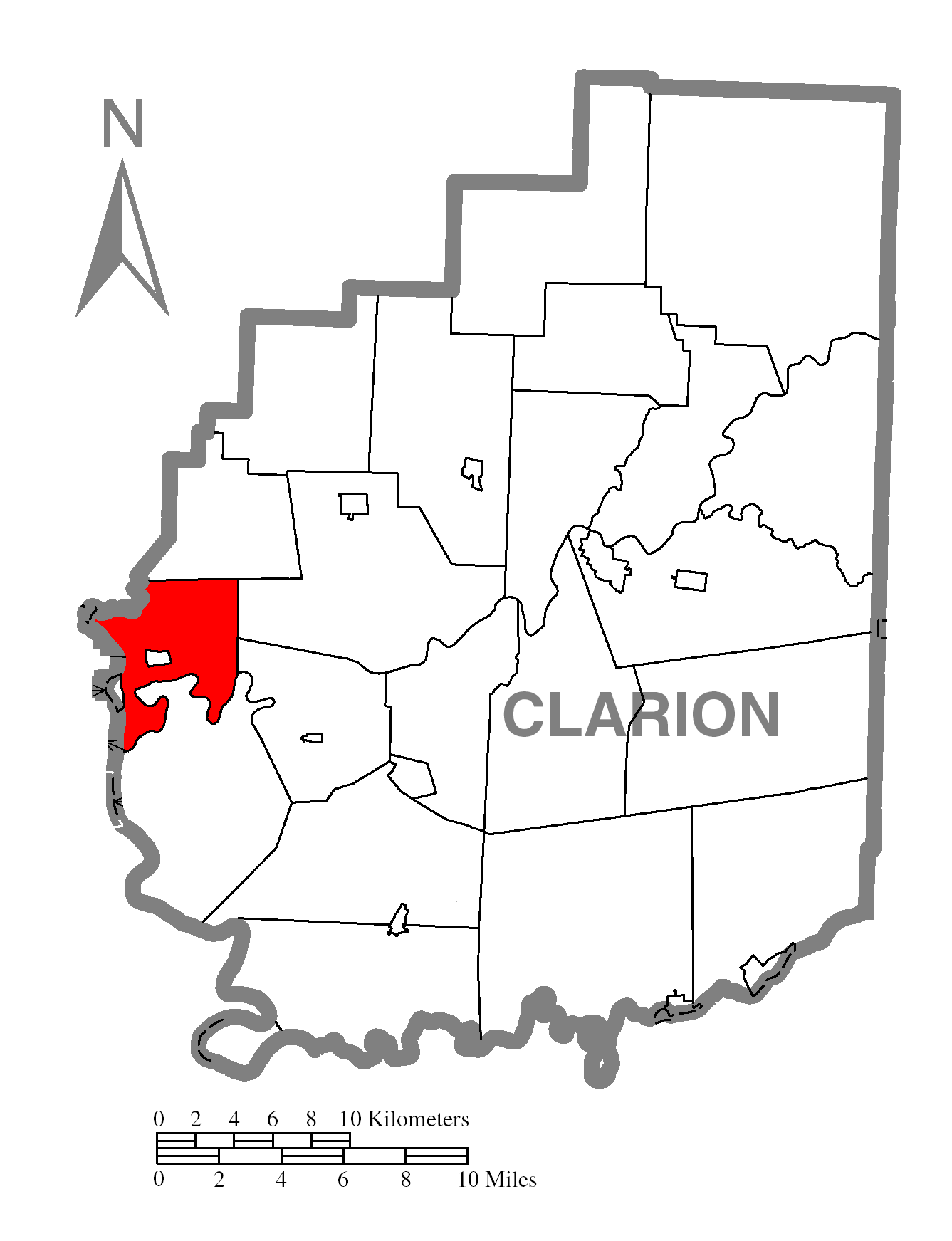
- Map of Clarion County, Pennsylvania highlighting Richland Township

- Map of Clarion County, Pennsylvania
- Country: United States
- State: Pennsylvania
- County: Clarion
- Settled: 1806

Area
  - Total: 15.79 sq mi (40.89 km^{2})
  - Land: 15.07 sq mi (39.04 km^{2})
  - Water: 0.71 sq mi (1.84 km^{2})

Population (2020)
  - Total: 473
  - Estimate (2021): 478
  - Density: 31.1/sq mi (11.99/km^{2})
- Time zone: UTC-5 (Eastern (EST))
  - Summer (DST): UTC-4 (EDT)
- FIPS code: 42-031-64552

Richland Township is a township in Clarion County, Pennsylvania, United States. The population was 473 at the 2020 census, a decrease from the figure of 494 tabulated in 2010.

== Geography ==
Richland Township is located in western Clarion County and is bordered to the west by the Allegheny River, which forms the Armstrong County line. A small portion of the river border touches Butler County. The township is bordered to the northwest by Venango County. The winding Clarion River forms the southern boundary of the township. The borough of St. Petersburg is south of the center of the township, and the borough of Foxburg is along the western edge of the township at a crossing of the Allegheny. A small portion of the borough of Emlenton touches the northwestern corner of the township. All of the boroughs are separate municipalities from the township.

Interstate 80 runs east–west along the northern edge of the township. Exit 45 (Pennsylvania Route 478) is partially within the township at the northern border.

According to the United States Census Bureau, the township has a total area of 15.8 square miles (40.9 km^{2}), of which 15.1 square miles (39.0 km^{2}) is land and 0.69 square miles (1.8 km^{2}), or 4.51%, is water.

== Demographics ==
Historical population
Census	Pop.	Note	%±
2010	494		—
2020	473		−4.3%
2021 (est.)	478		1.1%
U.S. Decennial Census

As of the census of 2000, there were 553 people, 213 households, and 161 families residing in the township. The population density was 36.6 inhabitants per square mile (14.1/km^{2}). There were 279 housing units at an average density of 18.5/sq mi (7.1/km^{2}). The racial makeup of the township was 99.28% White, 0.36% African American, 0.18% Native American and 0.18% Asian. Hispanic or Latino of any race were 0.54% of the population.

There were 213 households, out of which 33.3% had children under the age of 18 living with them, 66.2% were married couples living together, 6.1% had a female householder with no husband present, and 24.4% were non-families. 20.7% of all households were made up of individuals, and 8.0% had someone living alone who was 65 years of age or older. The average household size was 2.60 and the average family size was 3.01.

In the township the population was spread out, with 24.4% under the age of 18, 6.3% from 18 to 24, 27.7% from 25 to 44, 27.1% from 45 to 64, and 14.5% who were 65 years of age or older. The median age was 38 years. For every 100 females there were 107.1 males. For every 100 females age 18 and over, there were 98.1 males.

The median income for a household in the township was $32,083, and the median income for a family was $36,250. Males had a median income of $28,594 versus $19,531 for females. The per capita income for the township was $14,764. About 12.0% of families and 12.9% of the population were below the poverty line, including 23.0% of those under age 18 and 11.3% of those age 65 or over.
