= Scrubgrass Township, Pennsylvania =

Township in Pennsylvania, US

Coordinates: 41°16′00″N 79°47′59″W

- Township
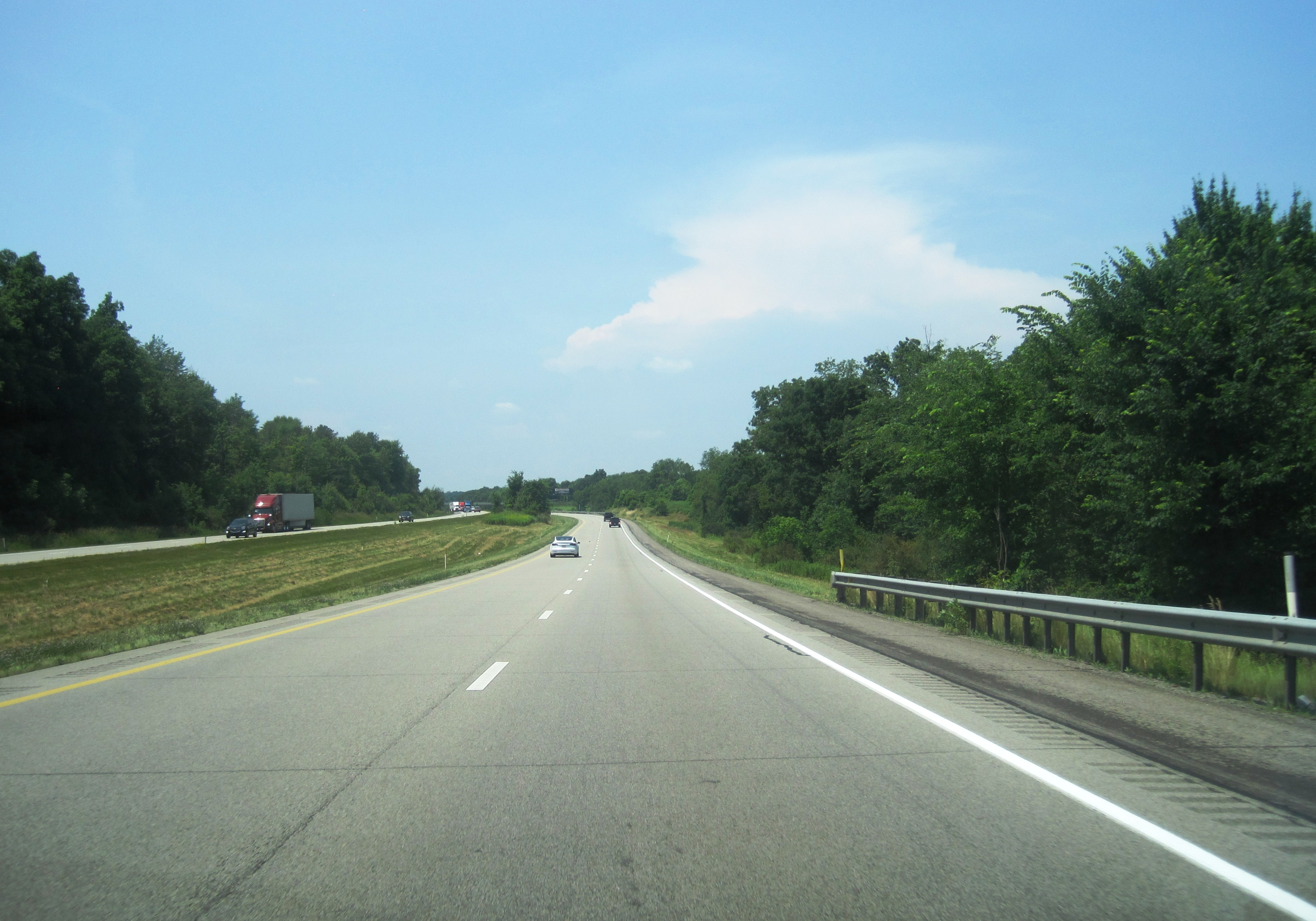
- I-80 westbound in Scrubgrass Township

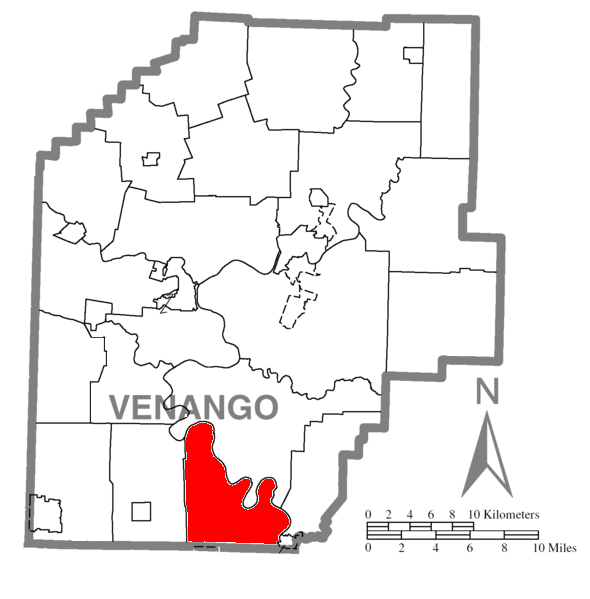
- Map of Venango County, Pennsylvania highlighting Scrubgrass Township

- Map of Venango County, Pennsylvania
- Country: United States
- State: Pennsylvania
- County: Venango
- Settled: 1795
- Incorporated: 1806

Government
  - Type: Board of Supervisors

Area
  - Total: 27.81 sq mi (72.03 km^{2})
  - Land: 25.87 sq mi (67.01 km^{2})
  - Water: 1.94 sq mi (5.02 km^{2})

Population (2020)
  - Total: 750 ▼
  - Estimate (2024): 733
  - Density: 27.9/sq mi (10.76/km^{2})
- Time zone: UTC-5 (Eastern (EST))
  - Summer (DST): UTC-4 (EDT)
- Area code: 814
- FIPS code: 42-121-69016

Scrubgrass Township is a township in Venango County, Pennsylvania, United States. The population was 750 at the 2020 census.

== Geography ==
According to the United States Census Bureau, the township has a total area of 27.5 square miles (71.1 km^{2}), of which 25.8 square miles (66.7 km^{2}) is land and 1.7 square miles (4.5 km^{2}) (6.26%) is water.

== Demographics ==
Historical population
Census	Pop.	Note	%±
2010	751		—
2020	750		−0.1%
2024 (est.)	733		−2.3%
U.S. Decennial Census

As of the census of 2000, there were 799 people, 320 households, and 240 families residing in the township. The population density was 31.0 inhabitants per square mile (12.0/km^{2}). There were 600 housing units at an average density of 23.3/sq mi (9.0/km^{2}). The racial makeup of the township was 97.37% White, 0.88% African American, 0.13% Native American, 0.13% Asian, and 1.50% from two or more races.

There were 320 households, out of which 29.4% had children under the age of 18 living with them, 62.8% were married couples living together, 9.1% had a female householder with no husband present, and 24.7% were non-families. 21.6% of all households were made up of individuals, and 9.7% had someone living alone who was 65 years of age or older. The average household size was 2.50 and the average family size was 2.88.

In the township the population was spread out, with 22.3% under the age of 18, 7.6% from 18 to 24, 27.4% from 25 to 44, 23.7% from 45 to 64, and 19.0% who were 65 years of age or older. The median age was 41 years. For every 100 females, there were 106.5 males. For every 100 females age 18 and over, there were 103.6 males.

The median income for a household in the township was $37,083, and the median income for a family was $40,655. Males had a median income of $37,500 versus $20,417 for females. The per capita income for the township was $16,839. About 7.7% of families and 14.3% of the population were below the poverty line, including 25.1% of those under age 18 and 3.4% of those age 65 or over.
