= Richland Township, Venango County, Pennsylvania =

Township in Pennsylvania, US

Coordinates: 41°15′48″N 79°39′23″W

- Township
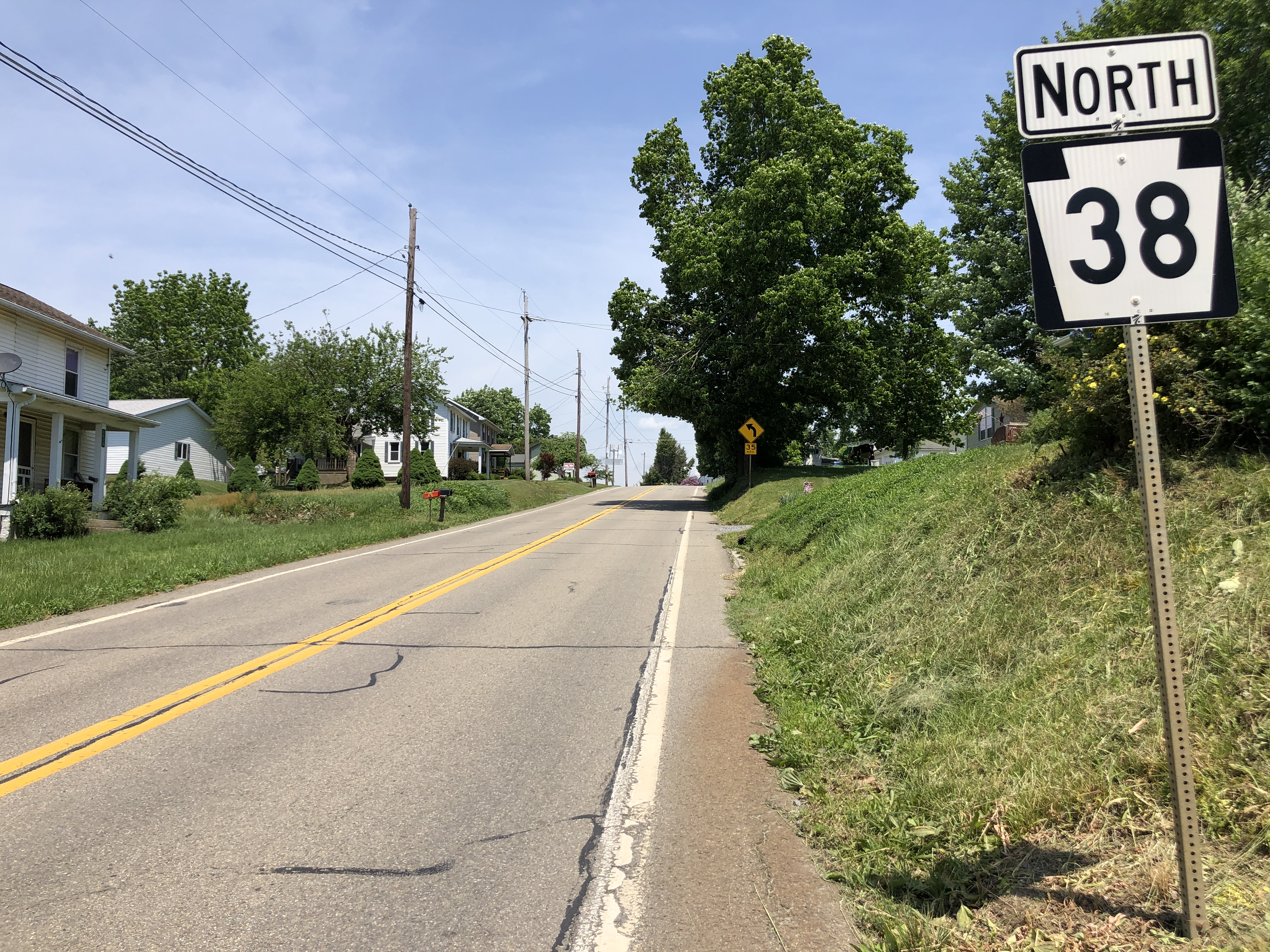
- PA 38 in Richland Township

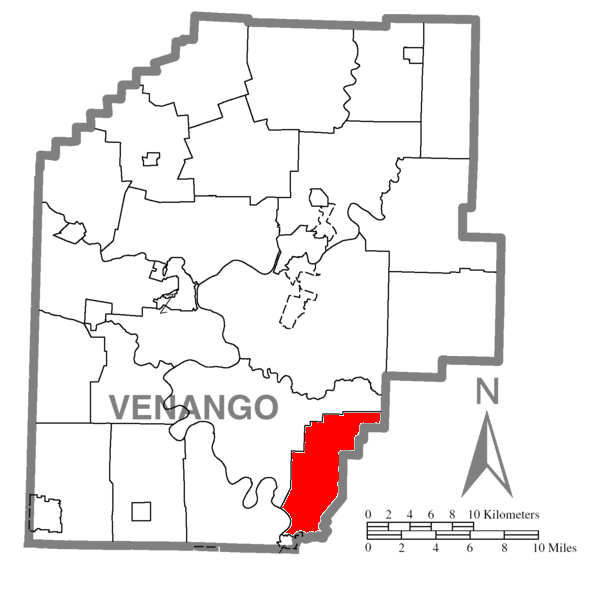
- Map of Venango County, Pennsylvania highlighting Richland Township

- Map of Venango County, Pennsylvania
- Country: United States
- State: Pennsylvania
- County: Venango
- Settled: 1796
- Incorporated: 1806

Government
  - Type: Board of Supervisors

Area
  - Total: 22.41 sq mi (58.05 km^{2})
  - Land: 22.22 sq mi (57.56 km^{2})
  - Water: 0.19 sq mi (0.50 km^{2})

Population (2020)
  - Total: 776 ▼
  - Estimate (2024): 764
  - Density: 33.9/sq mi (13.08/km^{2})
- Time zone: UTC-5 (Eastern (EST))
  - Summer (DST): UTC-4 (EDT)
- Area code: 814
- FIPS code: 42-121-64568

Richland Township is a township in Venango County, Pennsylvania, United States. The population was 776 at the 2020 census.

== Geography ==
According to the United States Census Bureau, the township has a total area of 22.4 square miles (58.0 km^{2}), of which 22.2 square miles (57.4 km^{2}) is land and 0.2 square mile (0.5 km^{2}) (0.85%) is water.

== Demographics ==
Historical population
Census	Pop.	Note	%±
2010	777		—
2020	776		−0.1%
2024 (est.)	764		−1.5%
U.S. Decennial Census

As of the census of 2000, there were 744 people, 291 households, and 213 families residing in the township. The population density was 33.5 inhabitants per square mile (12.9/km^{2}). There were 341 housing units at an average density of 15.4/sq mi (5.9/km^{2}). The racial makeup of the township was 99.33% White, 0.13% Native American, 0.40% Asian, and 0.13% from two or more races. Hispanic or Latino of any race were 0.67% of the population.

There were 291 households, out of which 27.8% had children under the age of 18 living with them, 61.9% were married couples living together, 8.9% had a female householder with no husband present, and 26.5% were non-families. 22.7% of all households were made up of individuals, and 10.3% had someone living alone who was 65 years of age or older. The average household size was 2.56 and the average family size was 3.01.

In the township the population was spread out, with 21.8% under the age of 18, 8.1% from 18 to 24, 27.2% from 25 to 44, 26.7% from 45 to 64, and 16.3% who were 65 years of age or older. The median age was 42 years. For every 100 females, there were 97.9 males. For every 100 females age 18 and over, there were 97.3 males.

The median income for a household in the township was $33,661, and the median income for a family was $39,688. Males had a median income of $27,500 versus $20,972 for females. The per capita income for the township was $16,940. About 8.7% of families and 11.9% of the population were below the poverty line, including 19.0% of those under age 18 and 7.8% of those age 65 or over.
