= Emlenton, Pennsylvania =

Borough in Pennsylvania, US

- Borough
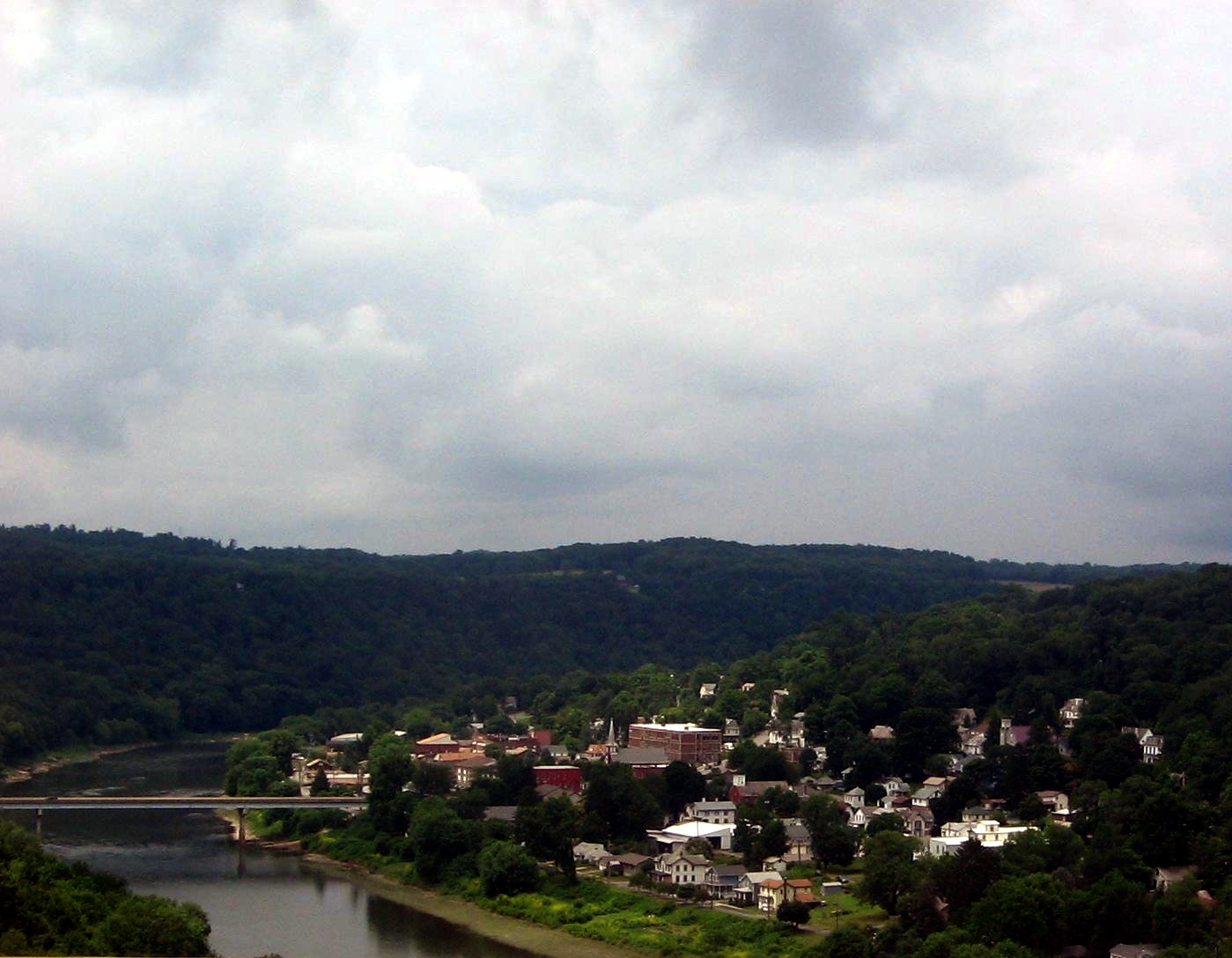
- Emlenton in July 2009

- Location of Emlenton in Clarion County, Pennsylvania

- Map showing Clarion County in Pennsylvania

- Location within Pennsylvania
- Coordinates: 41°10′42″N 79°42′37″W
- Country: United States
- State: Pennsylvania
- Counties: Clarion and Venango
- Settled: 1820
- Incorporated: 1859

Government
  - Type: Borough Council
  - Mayor: Judy Lentz
  - Council President: Barry Louise

Area
  - Total: 0.59 sq mi (1.52 km^{2})
  - Land: 0.58 sq mi (1.51 km^{2})
  - Water: 0.0039 sq mi (0.01 km^{2})
- Elevation: 920 ft (280 m)

Population (2020)
  - Total: 614
  - Density: 1,055/sq mi (407.5/km^{2})
- Time zone: UTC-5 (Eastern (EST))
  - Summer (DST): UTC-4 (EDT)
- ZIP Code: 16373
- Area code: 724
- FIPS code: 42-23568
- Website: emlentonpaborough.com

Emlenton is a borough in Clarion and Venango counties in the U.S. state of Pennsylvania. As of the 2020 census, Emlenton had a population of 614. The borough is home to the Emlenton Bridge on I-80, which spans the Allegheny River.

== History ==
Emlenton is named for Hannah Emlen Fox, the wife of Joseph Mickle Fox, one of its founders and original land owner.

The Emlenton Historic District was added to the National Register of Historic Places in 1997.

Since 1979, Emlenton has been home to Kobzarska Sich an annual intensive two-week Ukrainian Bandura music camp along the banks for the Allegheny River. The camp was founded and run for many years by renowned composer Hryhory Kytasty, who was posthumously rewarded the title of Hero of Ukraine by President Viktor Yushchenko in 2008.

== Geography ==
According to the U.S. Census Bureau, the borough has a total area of 0.59 square miles (1.52 km^{2}), of which 0.004 square miles (0.01 km^{2}), or 0.77%, is water.

== Demographics ==
Historical population
Census	Pop.	Note	%±
1870	488		—
1880	1,140		133.6%
1890	1,126		−1.2%
1900	1,190		5.7%
1910	1,110		−6.7%
1920	1,025		−7.7%
1930	1,137		10.9%
1940	986		−13.3%
1950	945		−4.2%
1960	844		−10.7%
1970	854		1.2%
1980	807		−5.5%
1990	834		3.3%
2000	784		−6.0%
2010	625		−20.3%
2020	614		−1.8%

As of the 2000 census, there were 784 people, 322 households, and 200 families residing in the borough. The population density was 947.1 inhabitants per square mile (365.7/km^{2}). There were 360 housing units at an average density of 434.9 units per square mile (167.9 units/km^{2}). The racial makeup of the borough was 98.85% White, 0.26% Native American, 0.38% Asian, and 0.51% from two or more races.

There were 322 households, out of which 29.2% had children under the age of 18 living with them, 45.3% were married couples living together, 12.7% had a female householder with no husband present, and 37.6% were non-families. 35.4% of all households were made up of individuals, and 17.7% had someone living alone who was 65 years of age or older. The average household size was 2.30 and the average family size was 2.94.

In the borough, the population was spread out, with 23.5% under the age of 18, 7.0% from 18 to 24, 23.3% from 25 to 44, 22.7% from 45 to 64, and 23.5% who were 65 years of age or older. The median age was 42 years. For every 100 females there were 77.8 males. For every 100 females age 18 and over, there were 77.5 males.

The median income for a household in the borough was $30,227, and the median income for a family was $40,893. Males had a median income of $33,125 versus $21,875 for females. The per capita income for the borough was $16,952. About 10.7% of families and 15.1% of the population were below the poverty line, including 19.0% of those under age 18 and 11.4% of those age 65 or over.

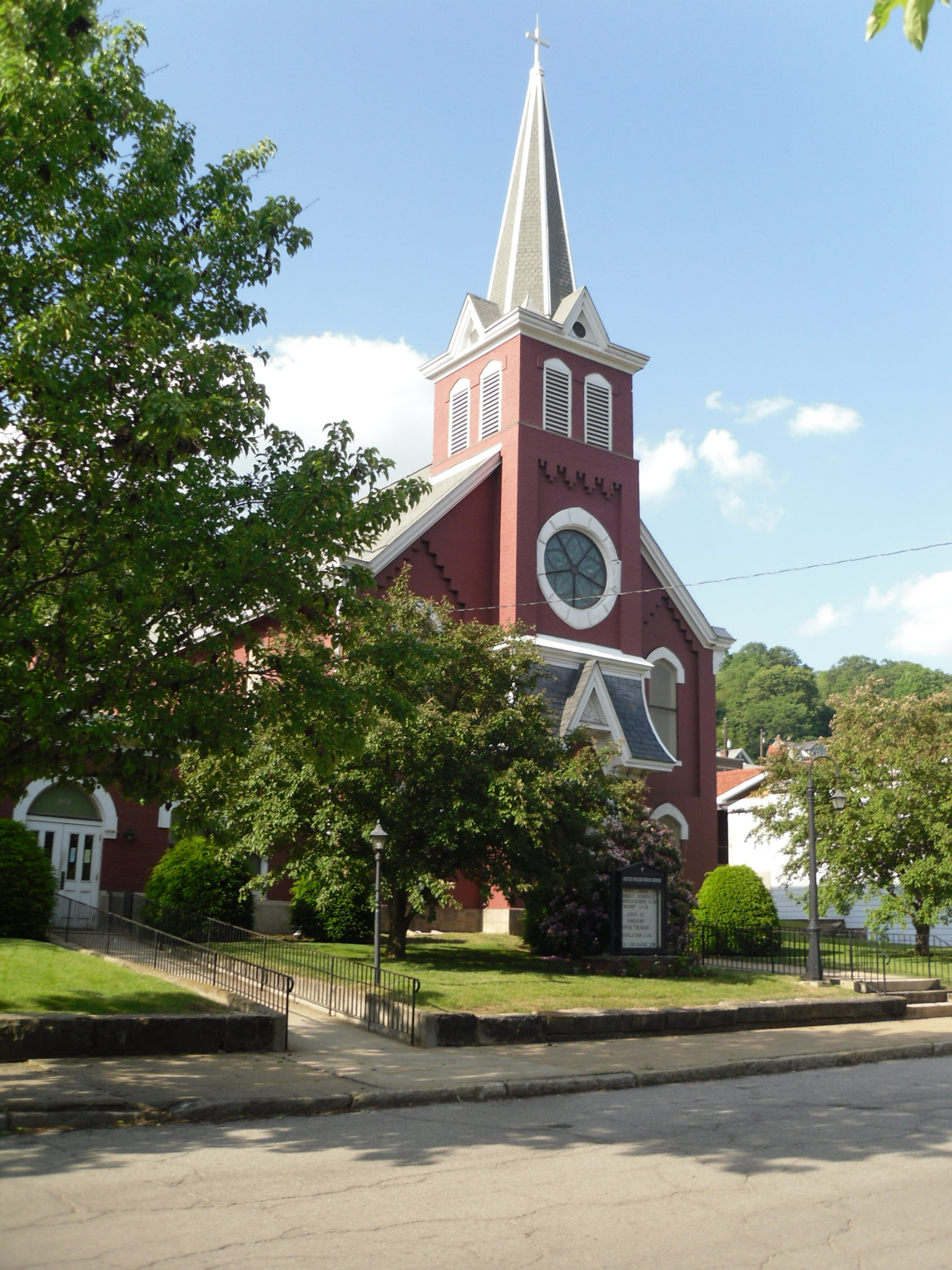
Emlenton Presbyterian Church

== See also ==
- East Brady, Pennsylvania
- Foxburg, Pennsylvania
- Parker, Pennsylvania
