= Allegheny-Clarion Valley School District =

Public school district in Pennsylvania, United States

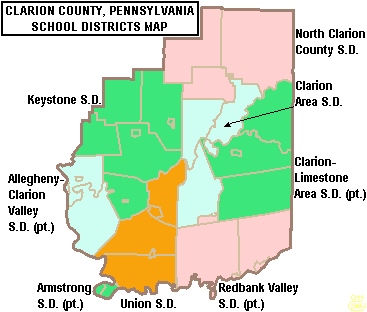

Address
- 776 State Route 58 Foxburg, Clarion County, Bulter County, Armstrong County, Venango County, Pennsylvania, 16036; United States

District information
- Type: Public

Students and staff
- District mascot: Falcons
- Colors: Blue and white

Other information
- Website: www.acvsd.org

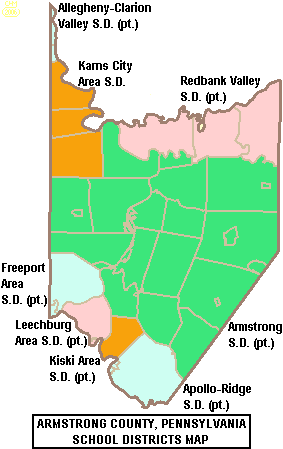
Allegheny-Clarion Valley School District region in Armstrong County

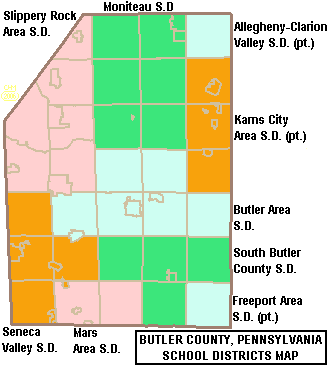
Allegheny-Clarion Valley School District region in Butler County

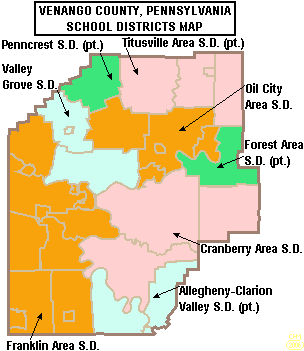
Allegheny-Clarion Valley School District region in Venango County

Allegheny-Clarion Valley School District (ACVSD) is a small, rural, public school district in western Pennsylvania. It spans portions of four counties and is the only Pennsylvania public school district to do so. The district is one of the 500 public school districts of Pennsylvania. The Allegheny-Clarion Valley School District encompasses approximately 121 square miles (310 km^{2}). In Armstrong County it covers the City of Parker and Hovey Township. In Butler County it serves Allegheny Township. In Clarion County it serves the Boroughs of Emlenton, Foxburg and St. Petersburg and Perry Township and Richland Township. In Venango County it serves the Borough of Emlenton and Richland Township and Scrubgrass Township. According to 2000 federal census data, Allegheny-Clarion Valley School District serves a resident population of 5,944. By 2010, the district's population declined to 5,749 people. In 2009, the district residents' per capita income was $15,525, while the median family income was $36,867. In the Commonwealth of Pennsylvania, the median family income was $49,501 and the United States median family income was $49,445, in 2010. By 2013, the median household income in the United States rose to $52,100.

The district operates:

- Allegheny-Clarion Valley Elementary School – Grades K-6
- Address: 776 Route 58, Foxburg, PA 16036
- Allegheny-Clarion Valley Jr./Sr. High School – Grades 7–12
- Address: 762 Route 58, Foxburg, PA 16036

== Extracurriculars ==
=== Sports ===
The district funds:

Varsity

Boys

- Baseball - A
- Basketball- A
- Cross Country - A
- Football - A
- Golf - AA
- Track and Field - AA

Girls

- Basketball - A
- Cheer - AAAA
- Cross Country - A
- Golf - AA
- Softball - A
- Track and Field - AA
- Volleyball - A

Junior High School Sports

Boys

- Basketball
- Cross Country
- Football
- Golf
- Track and Field

Girls

- Basketball
- Cross Country
- Golf
- Track and Field
- Volleyball

According to PIAA directory July 2013
