= Hovey Township, Armstrong County, Pennsylvania =

Township in Pennsylvania, US

Coordinates: 41°08′00″N 79°40′59″W

Hovey Township, Pennsylvania
- Township
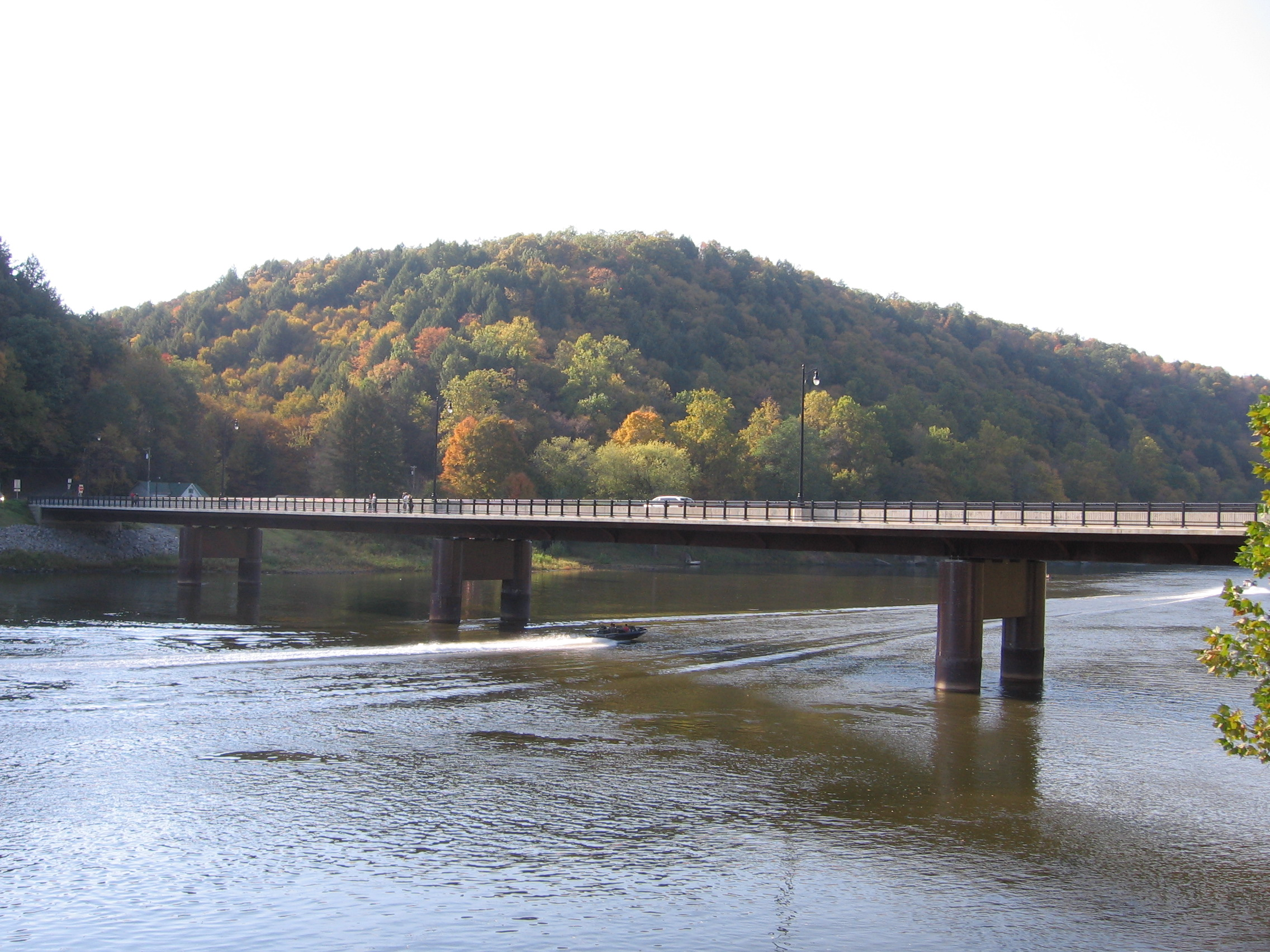
- Foxburg Bridge over the Allegheny River

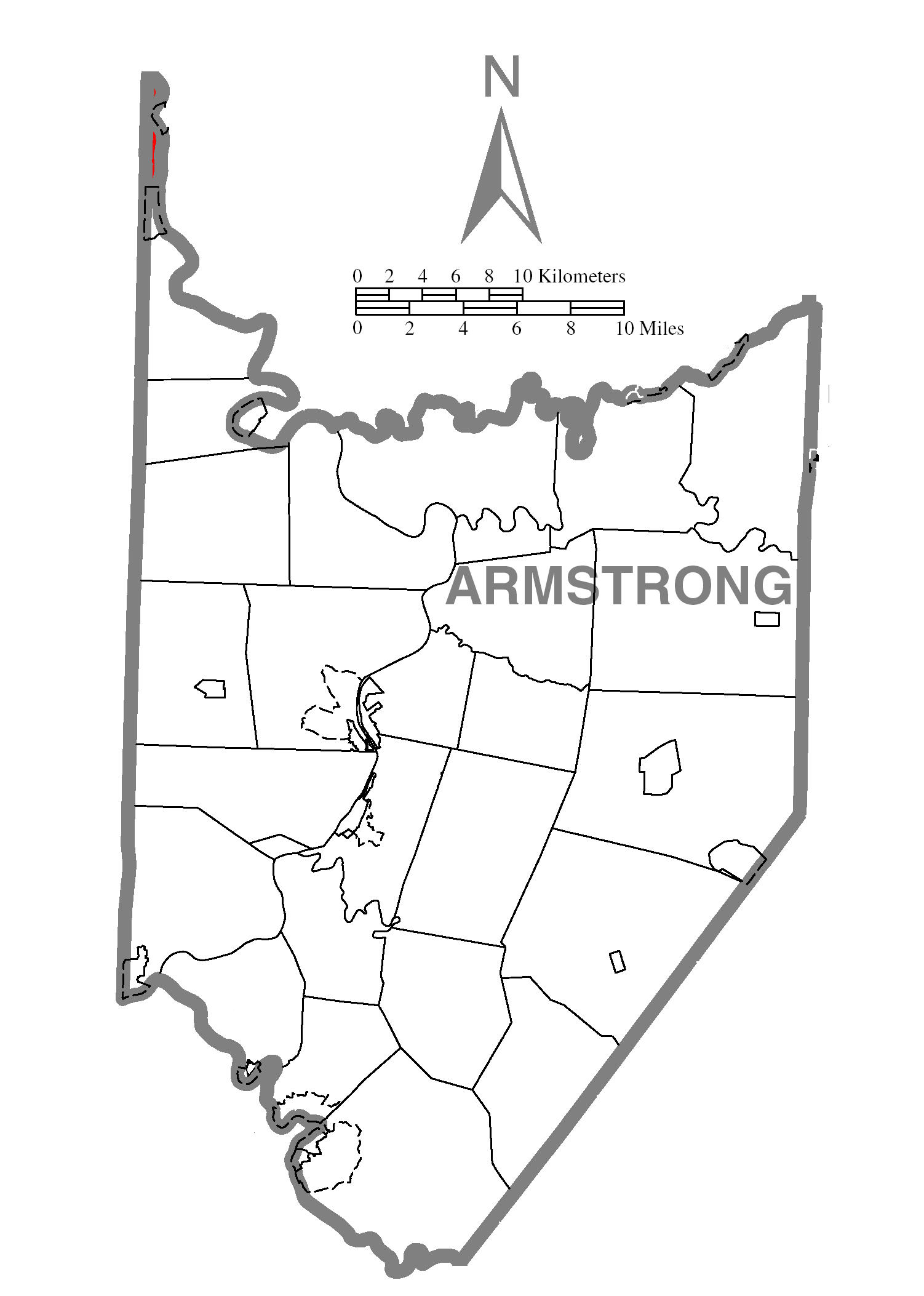
- Map of Armstrong County, Pennsylvania, highlighting Hovey Township

- Map of Armstrong County, Pennsylvania
- Country: United States
- State: Pennsylvania
- County: Armstrong
- Settled: 1797
- Incorporated: 1870

Area
  - Total: 2.15 sq mi (5.58 km^{2})
  - Land: 2.15 sq mi (5.58 km^{2})
  - Water: 0 sq mi (0.00 km^{2})

Population (2020)
  - Total: 74
  - Estimate (2021): 73
  - Density: 44.1/sq mi (17.04/km^{2})
- Time zone: UTC-5 (Eastern (EST))
  - Summer (DST): UTC-4 (EDT)
- FIPS code: 42-005-35936

Hovey Township is a township which is located in far northern Armstrong County, Pennsylvania, United States. The population was seventy-four at the time of the 2020 census, a decrease from the figure of 97 tabulated in 2010.

== Geography ==
Hovey Township occupies a narrow strip of land between the Allegheny River to the east and the Butler County border to the west, ending where the river intersects the county line.

Pennsylvania Route 268 runs the length of the township along the Allegheny River, leading north 2 miles (3 km) to Emlenton and south beyond Parker 28 miles (45 km) to West Kittanning. Pennsylvania Route 58 crosses the township east–west, leading east across the river to Foxburg and Sligo and west via Eau Claire to Grove City.

According to the United States Census Bureau, the township has a total area of 2.2 square miles (5.6 km^{2}), all land.

== Surrounding and adjacent neighborhoods ==
Hovey Township has two land borders, with Parker to the south and Allegheny Township in Butler County to the west.

Across the Allegheny River to the east, Hovey Township runs adjacent with the Clarion County neighborhoods of Richland Township, Foxburg (with a direct connection via Foxburg Bridge), and Perry Township.

== Demographics ==
Historical population
Census	Pop.	Note	%±
2010	97		—
2020	74		−23.7%
2021 (est.)	73		−1.4%
U.S. Decennial Census

As of the 2000 census, there were 93 people, 38 households, and 25 families residing in the township.

The population density was 45.3 inhabitants per square mile (17.5/km^{2}). There were 97 housing units at an average density of 47.3 per square mile (18.3/km^{2}).

The racial makeup of the township was 97.85% White and 2.15% African American.

There were 38 households, out of which 26.3% had children under the age of eighteen living with them; 63.2% were married couples living together, 2.6% had a female householder with no husband present, and 34.2% were non-families. 26.3% of all households were made up of individuals, and 5.3% had someone living alone who was sixty-five years of age or older.

The average household size was 2.45 and the average family size was 3.00.

The township median age of forty-five years was significantly more than the county median age of forty years. The distribution by age group was 17.2% under the age of eighteen, 8.6% from eighteen to twenty-four, 23.7% from twenty-five to forty-four, 43.0% from forty-five to sixty-four, and 7.5% who were sixty-five years of age or older.

For every one hundred females, there were 132.5 males. For every one hundred females who were aged eighteen or older, there were 120.0 males.

The median income for a household in the township was $35,938, and the median income for a family was $36,563. Males had a median income of $28,750 compared with that of $18,750 for females.

The per capita income for the township was $16,573.

There were 9.5% of families and 17.9% of the population living below the poverty line, including 26.7% of those who were under age eighteen with no one who was over the age of sixty-four impoverished.

== History ==
Hovey Township appears in the 1876 Atlas of Armstrong County, Pennsylvania.
