= Northern Subdivision (Pennsylvania) =

The Northern Subdivision is a railroad line owned and operated by the Buffalo and Pittsburgh Railroad (BPRR), which is owned by Genesee and Wyoming Industries, in the U.S. state of Pennsylvania. The line is one of the oldest in Pennsylvania, and at one time, stretched all the way from Callery, to Mount Jewett, Pennsylvania. Today, more than half the line is gone.

== History ==
=== Callery Junction ===
The line was originally a 3 ft (914 mm) narrow gauge railway line built by the Pittsburgh and Western Railroad, which later became part of the Baltimore and Ohio Railroad. At the turn of the 20th century, a junction was built in Callery Junction (present-day Callery). The mainline headed northwest towards New Castle, while a small branch headed northeast towards Butler. The branch was eventually abandoned, and Callery Junction was no more. A new junction was built just north of Callery in the small village of Eidenau. The junction was named Harmony Junction, and it still exists today. The junction is now used to connect the Northern Subdivision with the P&W Subdivision. The P&W runs from the southeast to the northwest of Pittsburgh by way of Rankin to West Pittsburg near New Castle, while the Northern heads northeast towards Butler.

=== Harmony Junction to Bruin ===
From Harmony Junction, the line (operated by the B&P) runs along the scenic Connoquenessing Creek past Buhl's Station and Renfrew, Pennsylvania. Just past Renfrew, the B&P runs parallel with the Canadian National Railway (originally the Bessemer and Lake Erie Railroad) into Butler. Just north of the city is Calvin Yard where the B&P and CN share right-of-ways with each other. The B&P also has a large shop located at Calvin, and many of the railroad's locomotives are located at the site. Just outside East Butler, the line splits. The mainline continues east towards Punxsutawney, while a branch (original Northern Subdivision) heads north towards Petrolia. This part of the line is very popular among railfans for its old wooden trestles near the borough of Chicora. In Karns City and Petrolia, the B&P delivers and hauls chemicals from the large chemical plants located in the boroughs. The official end of the line is in Petrolia, but an abandoned section of track continues on to Bruin. The line and tracks end here, but there is still a mile long section of track between Bruin and Parker that has not seen service for decades.

=== Parker to Clarion Jct. ===
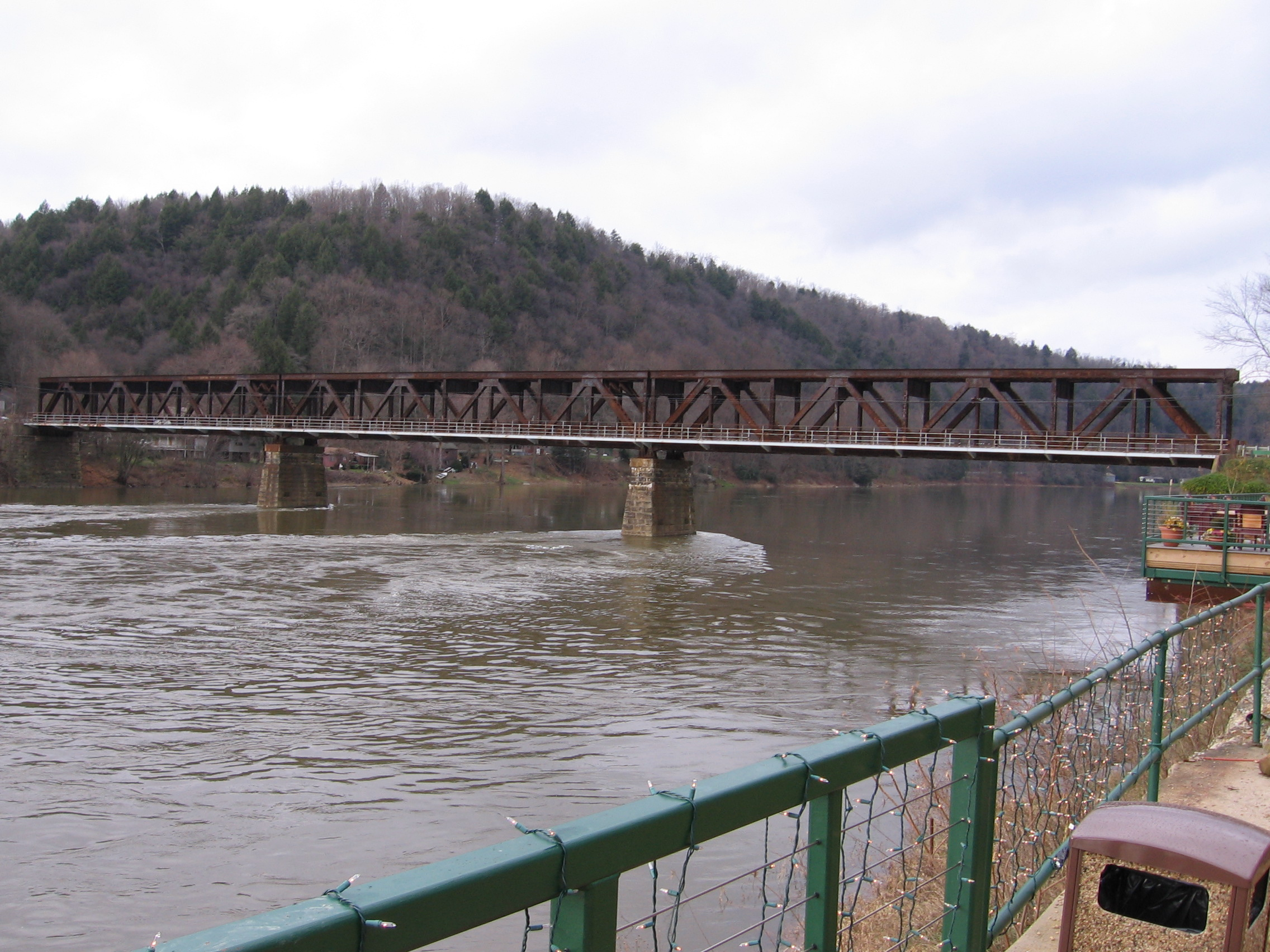
The old Foxburg Bridge carried trains on the Northern Subdivision over the Allegheny River from 1921 to 1964. The bridge was demolished in 2008.

The section of the line between Parker and Knox was abandoned by the B&O in 1964, but the tracks were not removed until 1982. The railroad ran north along the Allegheny River for about four miles until it reached the small borough of Foxburg where it crossed over the river, and the Allegheny Division of the Pennsylvania Railroad on the old Foxburg Bridge. The Pennsylvania RR in downtown Foxburg has been gone for many years, but a new rail trail is in development along the old right-of-way. The B&O's Foxburg Bridge was demolished on July 24, 2008. The Northern continued northeast of Foxburg, passing through the communities of St. Petersburg, Turkey City, and Knox. Before 2001, the Northern had tracks in the borough of Knox, which were used by the Knox and Kane Railroad. The main customer of the line was the Knox Glass Bottle Company, but once the company shut down, the line was abandoned. Attempts were made to create a tourist railroad to Knox, but this plan was not successful. The tracks were eventually removed and more of the Northern Subdivision was lost to history. The K&K made the southwest end of the line at Clarion Junction, just past Shippenville.

=== Clarion Jct. to Mount Jewett ===
From Clarion Jct., the K&K wound its way through fields and woods just outside Clarion, and then passed through the village of Lucinda. Between 1987 and 2005, the K&K had its rolling stock and locomotives located in the small village Marienville. The trains were eventually moved to Kane in early 2006. Between 1987 and 2004, the railroad ran a tourist railroad from Marienville to Kane, then passed through the borough of Mount Jewett to Kinzua Bridge State Park. The Northern Sub. had its official north end of the line located in Mount Jewett, but the K&K decided to extend the line to the Kinzua Bridge (that was once owned by the Erie Railroad) where the train would take tourists over the viaduct. In 2003, half the viaduct was toppled over by a tornado. The K&K ran the train to the park for another year, but service was ultimately cut, due to the loss of riders wanting to go over the bridge. Another tragedy struck in March 2008. Arsonists set fire to the enginehouse where the locomotives were kept after being moved from Marienville. Later that year, the Knox and Kane was sold at auction, but the stretch of rails operated by the K&K were left in place. Most of the tracks dated back to the 1920s when most of the original 3 ft (914 mm) gauge rail was replaced with 4 ft 8 1/2 in (1,435 mm) standard gauge rail on the Northern Subdivision. In the spring of 2010, the Kovalchick Corporation began the long process of removing the rail crossings along state roads between Clarion and McKean counties.
