= Pennsylvania Route 368 =

State highway in Pennsylvania, US

Pennsylvania Route 368

Route information
- Maintained by PennDOT
- Length: 7.367 mi (11.856 km)
- Existed: 1928–present

Major junctions
- West end: PA 268 in Parker
- East end: PA 58 in Callensburg

Location
- Country: United States
- State: Pennsylvania
- Counties: Armstrong, Clarion

Highway system
- Pennsylvania State Route System; Interstate; US; State; Scenic; Legislative
← PA 367	→ PA 370

Pennsylvania Route 368 (PA 368, designated by the Pennsylvania Department of Transportation as SR 0368) is an 7.37-mile-long (11.86 km) state highway located in Armstrong and Clarion counties in Pennsylvania. The western terminus is at PA 268 in Parker. The eastern terminus is at PA 58 in Callensburg. The highway was assigned in 1928 and on its current alignment by 1935, except for a change at the eastern terminus in 1967.

== Route description ==
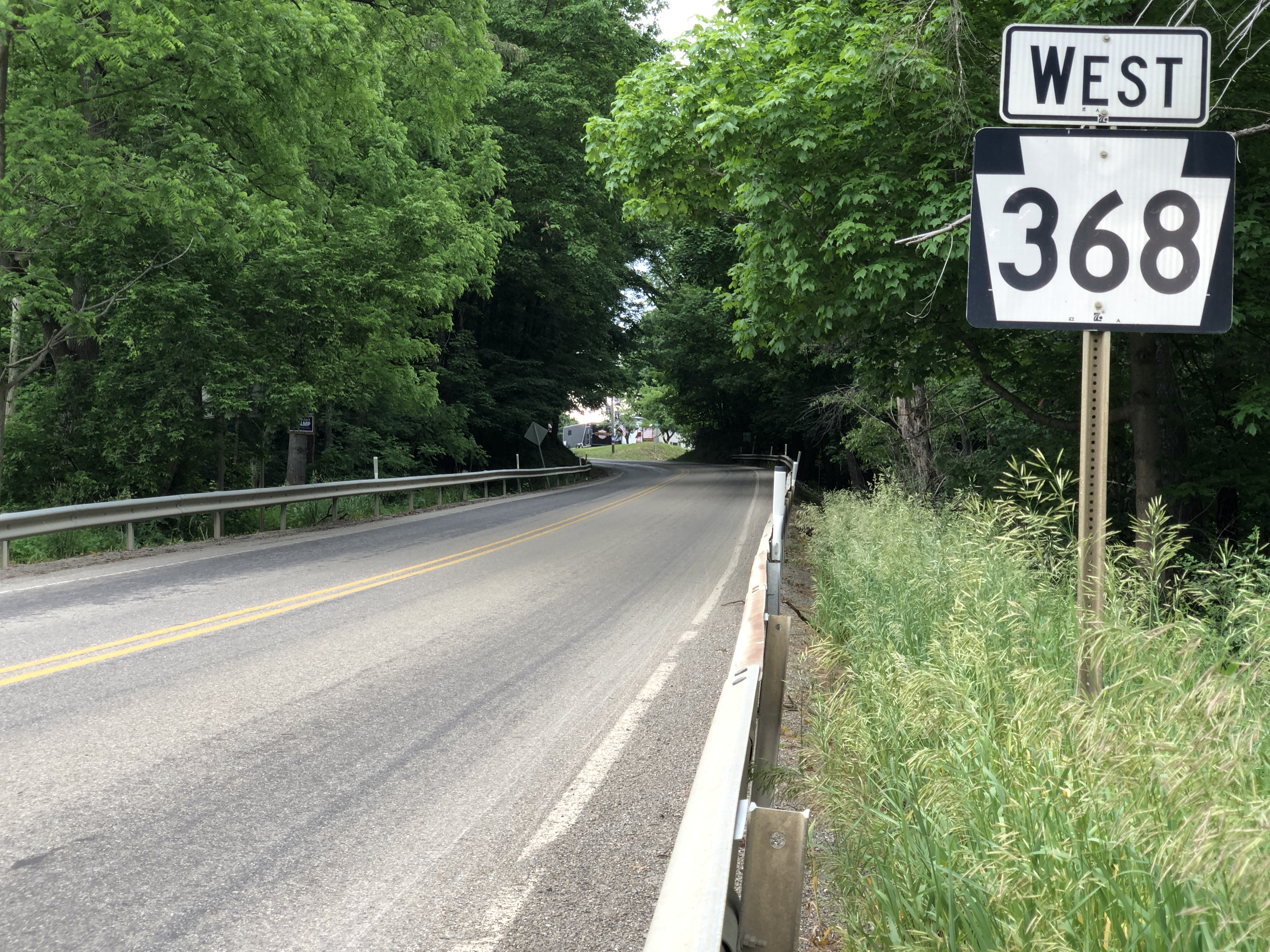
PA 368 westbound past PA 58 near Callensburg

PA 368 begins at an intersection with PA 268 (River Road) on the shores of the Allegheny River in the city of Parker. Just after the eastern terminus, the highway crosses over the Allegheny on the Parker Bridge. The highway crosses Perryville Road on an overpass, just before intersecting at a jughandle. After Perryville Road, PA 368 enters a small, rural region of Parker Township. At the intersection of Terwillger Road, the highway enters the community of Parkers Landing. Paralleling Perryville Road to the south, PA 368 passes a more suburban area of Parker Township. Just after leaving Parkers Landing, Perryville Road, which had been paralleling, merges back into the state route.

Hagertown Road then starts to parallel, but this also ends, with Hagertown merging in less than a half-mile later. After Hagertown Road, PA 368 progresses straight to the northeast through a rural, undeveloped terrain. At a break in a surrounding forest, the highway begins to re-develop its surroundings, entering Perry Township. At Lime Plank Road and Doc Walker Road, PA 368 enters the "downtown" community of Perry Township, leaving soon after for more forests. The highway continues farther, intersecting with Keefer Road. To the north, there is a large clearing, which also follows Keefer Road.

At the Myers Hollow Road intersection, PA 368 turns off its eastern progression and onto a northeastern one. There is some development along the highway, but this is uncommon. Nearing another change in direction, the area becomes more developed. After Callensburg Road, PA 368 makes a curve to the east, entering the borough of Callensburg. Changing official names from Route 368 to Main Street, the highway enters the downtown area. At Scott Street, the highway is well-developed. However, this changed in reverse, crossing into a small patch of forests. After the forest turns to clearing, PA 368 terminates at an intersection with PA 58, Craig Road and High Lane, locally maintained roads.

== History ==
PA 368 was assigned in the mass numbering of state highways in Pennsylvania during 1928. Also, the highway extended farther than PA 58 to PA 68 in Sligo. The entire highway at the time of assignment was not paved, save a couple of pieces. The highway was paved in 1930 from PA 268 in Parker to the Perryville Road intersection. However, one piece was yet to be completed. In 1932, the section from West Freedom to Sligo was paved, completing the highway. In 1935, the highway was realigned off Perryville Road, and onto a constructed alignment. In 1967, the eastern terminus of PA 368 was moved from its parent route (PA 68) to an intersection with PA 58 in Callensburg.

== Major intersections ==
County	Location	mi	km	Destinations	Notes
Armstrong	Parker	0.000	0.000	PA 268 (North River Avenue) to I-80	Western terminus
Clarion	Licking Township	7.367	11.856	PA 58	Eastern terminus
1.000 mi = 1.609 km; 1.000 km = 0.621 mi
