= Knox and Kane Railroad =

Defunct tourist railroad formerly based in Marienville, Pennsylvania

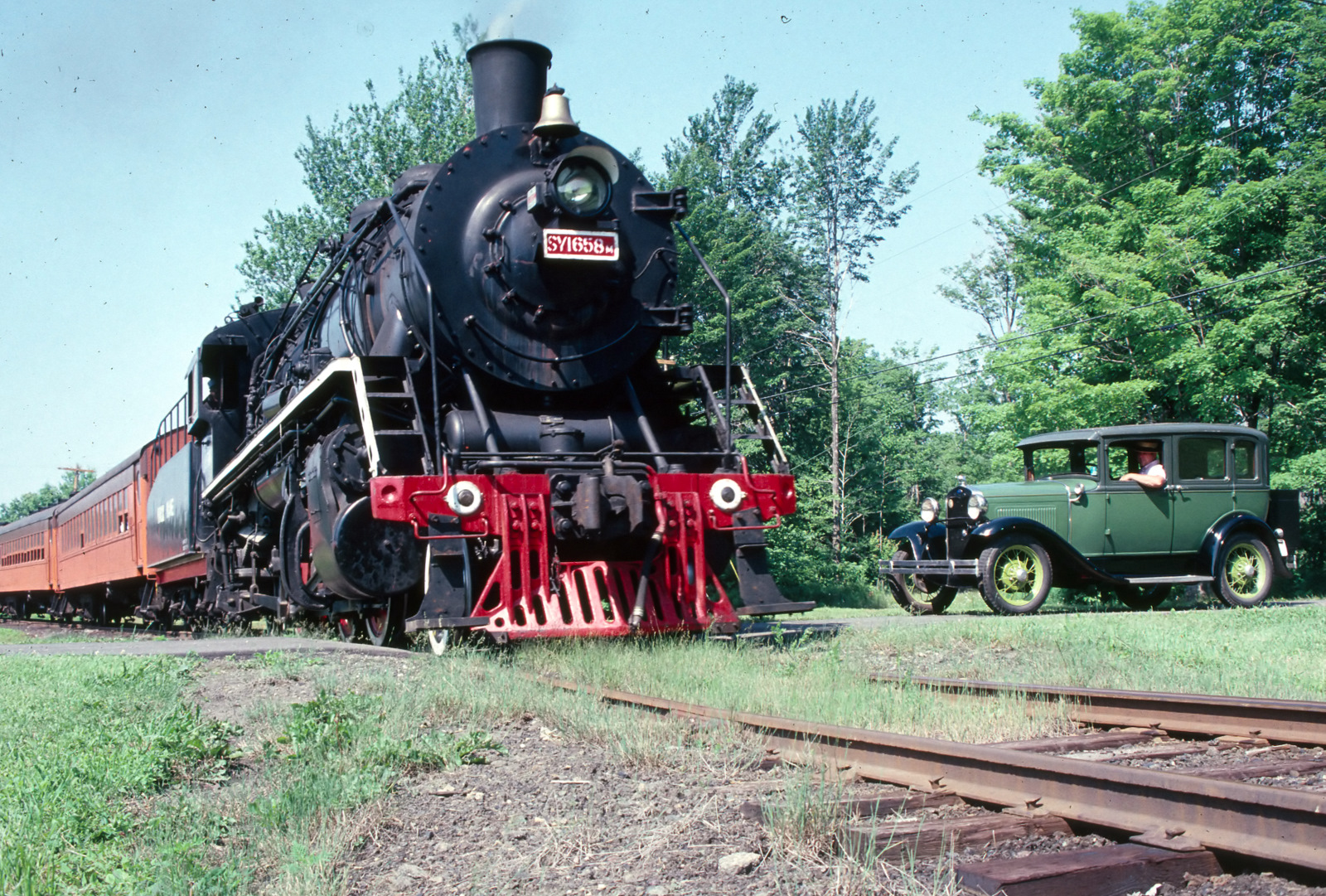
- No. 1658 hauling an excursion train on the KKRR, July 1990

Overview
- Headquarters: Marienville, Pennsylvania
- Reporting mark: KKRR
- Locale: Northwestern Pennsylvania
- Dates of operation: 1982–2008
- Predecessor: Baltimore and Ohio Railroad

Technical
- Track gauge: 4 ft 8 1/2 in (1,435 mm) standard gauge
- Length: 82 miles (132 km)

The Knox and Kane Railroad (reporting mark KKRR) was a shortline railroad located in Marienville, Pennsylvania that operated between Knox, in Clarion County, to Kane and then on to Mount Jewett, in McKean County.

== History ==
=== Early years ===
The track and right of way was bought from the Baltimore and Ohio Railroad in 1982 when the B&O discontinued operations on the old Northern Subdivision between Foxburg and Kane. This line was a part of the old Pittsburgh and Western Railroad, originally a 3 ft (914 mm) narrow-gauge line created in the latter third of the 19th century from a merging of various earlier narrow-gauge lines.

When the segment of the B&O from Foxburg to Knox was taken out of service, shipping raw materials, mostly glassmaking sand, to Knox Glass became difficult. To ease this situation, a connection with the Conrail (originally the New York Central Railroad) line through Shippenville was put in place. The B&O and NYC crossed each other not too far west of Shippenville for many years, but there had never been provision for interchange between the two roads. Operations in to Knox, which had been the original southern terminus of the KKRR, were discontinued around the time the only real customer in Knox, the Knox glass bottle company, ceased operations. This ended the use of the Shippenville interchange.

After the Knox segment was embargoed, the southern terminus became what was known as North Clarion Junction, where there was a fibreboard plant and a wye, the tail track of which had been the P&W's line across to the east side of the Clarion River to the borough of Clarion (county seat of Clarion County). This branch was discontinued at around the time the B&O purchased the P&W. The bridge over the Clarion River needed replacement and the railroad requested that the town help with funding the project. Clarion's town fathers declined this honor, so the railroad cut back service to the west side of the river, which was eventually abandoned as well.

At one time, the KKRR derived some revenue from shipping out car loadings of coal from what had once been an extensive coal mining complex in and around the village of Lucinda, a few miles north of North Clarion Junction. During the 1940s, 1950s and early 1960s, under B&O ownership, coal loadings from this area were quite extensive. A conductor's report from one northbound freight train (Foxburg to Kane) in the early 1960s showed in excess of fifty loads of coal shipped north out of Lucinda, most of it bound for ports on the Great Lakes. The last coal shipper on the line, Zacheryl Coal, went bankrupt not too many years after the KKRR acquired the line, which materially reduced shipping over the line, and thus reduced income.

=== Tourist ===
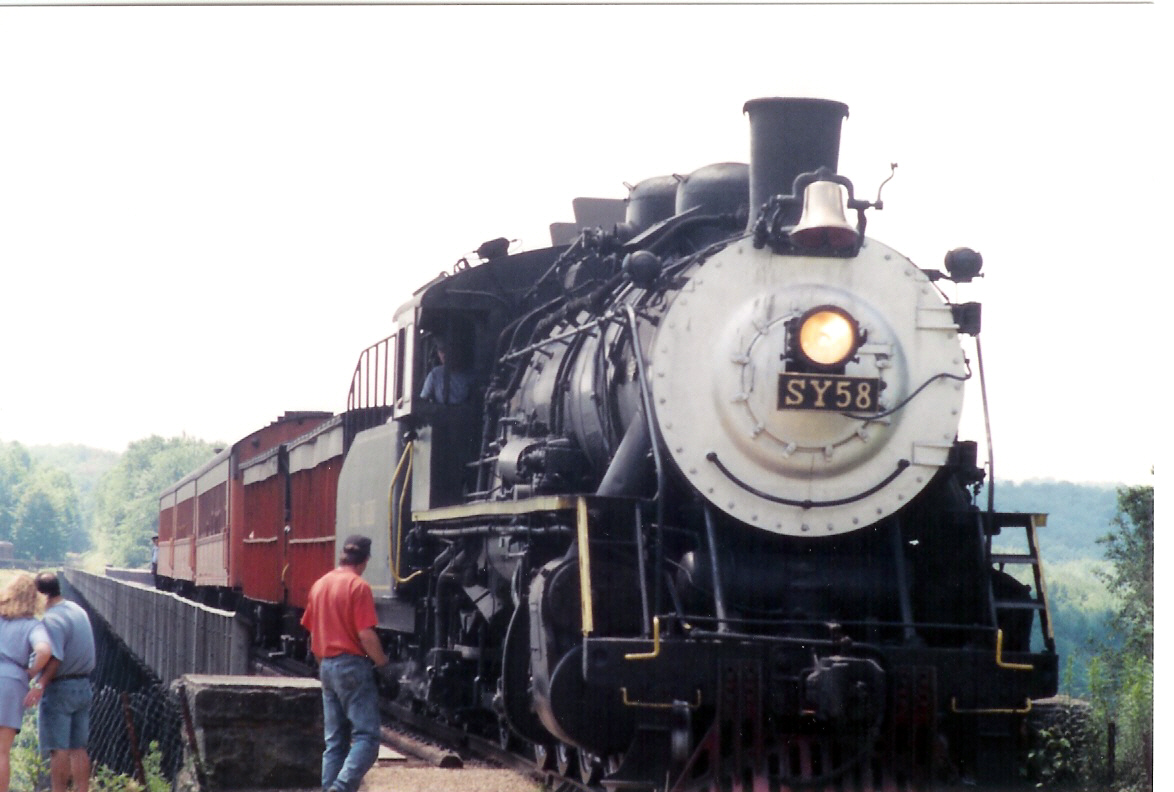
No. 58 on the Kinzua Bridge

Sloan Cornell purchased a portion the KKRR line in 1982 for use as a shortline freight railroad, and it later began operations in August 1987 as a tourist railroad, operating over the segment of the line from Kane to Marienville (originally the site of another of the Knox Glass Bottle Company's plants), and back to Kane. A portion of the Erie Railroad was purchased so that the tourist trains could cross the Kinzua Bridge. The KKRR had rostered two steam locomotives, and their first one was No. 38, a 2-8-0 that was transferred from the Gettysburg Railroad in 1986. It was built by Baldwin in 1927 for the Huntington and Broad Top Mountain Railroad. No. 38 had not run since 1988, but was under restoration to be returned to steam. A new tender tank had been constructed.

Their second steam locomotive was Tangshan Locomotive and Rolling Stock Works-built 2-8-2 No. 58, which was built as SY1658 in 1989. It was imported new to the Knox and Kane, (one of only six steam engines imported from China after the end of steam in the States) and it was the KKRR's main steam locomotive for several years. As the B&O never saw a need to turn locomotives at Marienville, there was no wye or turntable in that community. So the KKRR built a turn table there, specifically to turn its steam locomotive. There was also a four bay roundhouse built in Marienville. Today, the roundhouse is in a considerable amount of disrepair, with three of the four tracks having been removed. The coaches used on the Knox & Kane were mostly an old type of Long Island Rail Road commuter cars. They were called Ping-Pong cars as they had round windows on the ends and being commuter cars going back and forth they resembled a ping pong ball going back and forth across the ping pong table. This type of car had been dubbed ping pong cars because of their tendency to rock and bounce all over, even when new on well maintained track. The cars were also notorious for rusting, making maintenance on these cars a constant chore. This collection of old and new equipment made for one of the more distinctive tourist train operations in the country, although it was often overlooked because of its remote location.

On June 27, 2002, the Pennsylvania Department of Conservation and Natural Resources (DCNR) banned all trains from crossing the Kinzua Bridge after it was determined that the deteriorating bridge was at risk of collapse from heavy winds.

In February 2003, workers from an Ohio-based construction and repair company began to restore and stabilize the Kinzua Bridge to eventually reopen it for the KKRR. On July 21, after all of the workers left for the day, a major storm spawned a tornado which struck the bridge, resulting in eleven of its twenty support towers toppling over. Rebuilding the bridge from its collapsed state was deemed too costly by state officials, so they instead left the ruins on display as a demonstration of the forces of nature. Following the collapse, the KKRR experienced a 75% decline in passenger ridership.

=== Final years ===
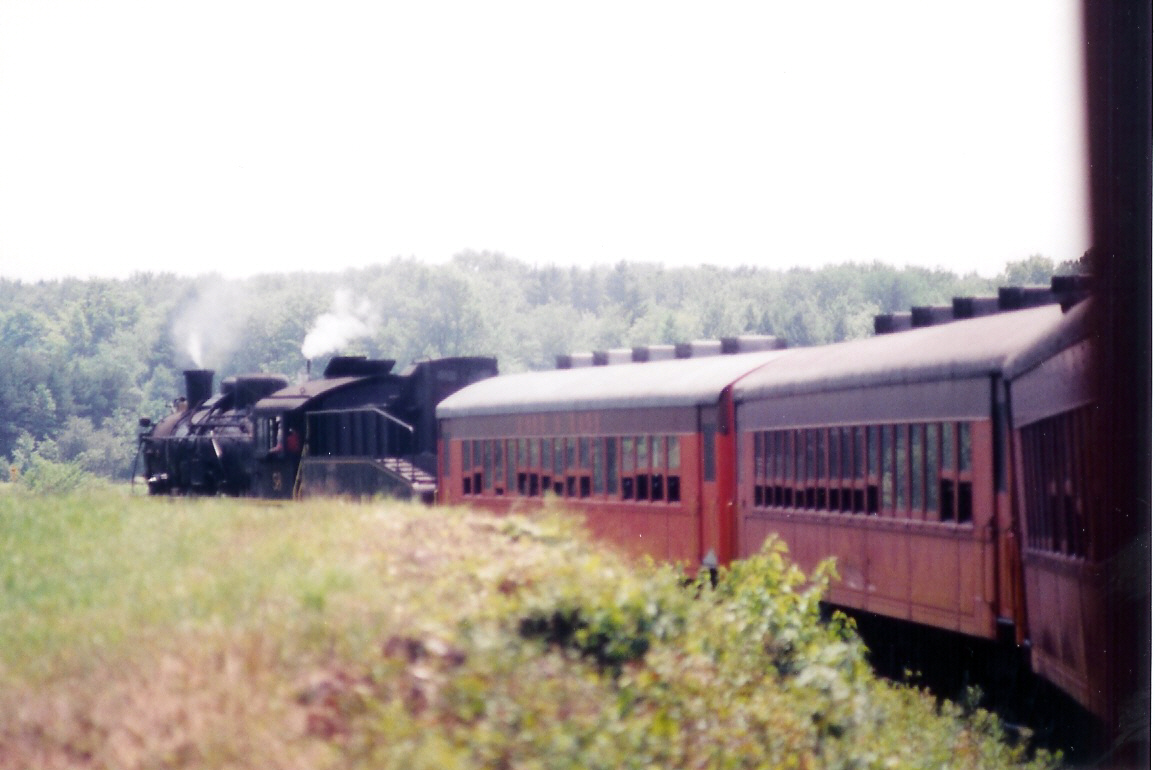
No. 58 hauling a tourist train on the K&K

The KKRR officially ceased tourist operations in October 2004 and freight operations followed suit by 2006. One reason was that freight shipments over the line had declined seriously over the years. An additional reason the line was abandoned as a tourist operation was that the main attraction of the ride was a trip over the Kinzua Bridge. When the Commonwealth of Pennsylvania, which owns the viaduct, could not afford to repair it, the railroad lost its major tourist draw.

In another devastating blow, on early Sunday March 16, 2008 the locomotives used to carry sightseers across the Kinzua Bridge were severely damaged by a fire set by arsonists. The fire, which burned the Biddle Street building used to house the trains in Kane, Pennsylvania caused $1 million in damage. This further dampened the dream of reopening the railroad.

=== End of the line ===
On October 10 and 11, 2008, the KKRR's rolling stock was auctioned off as part of a liquidation sale. The Kovalchick Corporation (which also owned the East Broad Top Railroad) bought the property. According to an article published in the Bradford Era newspaper immediately following the auction, the Kovalchicks reportedly had "little interest in resuming tourist rides along the rails."

In the spring of 2010, Kovalchick removed the rail crossings between Clarion and McKean counties. The section between the Bridge State Park and Center St. and Peterson St. (Mount Jewett) is now the Knox Kane Rail Trail.

== Locomotives ==
Locomotive details
Number	Image	Type	Model	Built	Builder	Owner
38		Steam	2-8-0	1927	Baldwin Locomotive Works	Everett Railroad
1658 / 58		Steam	2-8-2	1989	Tangshan Locomotive and Rolling Stock Works	Valley Railroad
1		Diesel	80-ton switcher	Unknown	Unknown	None (scrapped)
39		Diesel	GP9	1957	Electro-Motive Diesel	Western Maryland Scenic Railroad
44		Diesel	S-6	1919	American Locomotive Company	Genesee Valley Railroad
70		Diesel	RS-36	1962	American Locomotive Company	None (scrapped)
9090		Diesel	SW7	Unknown	Electro-Motive Diesel	Texas Northwestern Railway (later scrapped)

== Sources ==
- Burns, Robert W (1999). Ex-Baltimore & Ohio Lines in Northwestern Pennsylvania. Robert W. Burns.
- "Running up the Stumps". The Sentinel. Baltimore, Maryland: Baltimore and Ohio Railroad Historical Society. Spring 2002.
- Springirth, Kenneth C. (2010). Northwestern Pennsylvania Railroads. United States: Arcadia Publishing. pp. 89–98. ISBN 978-0738573472.
- Nanos, Tom (March 2012). "Mikado Reborn". Railfan & Railroad. Vol. 31, no. 3. Carstens Publications. pp. 28–33.
