= Callensburg, Pennsylvania =

Borough in Pennsylvania, US

- Borough
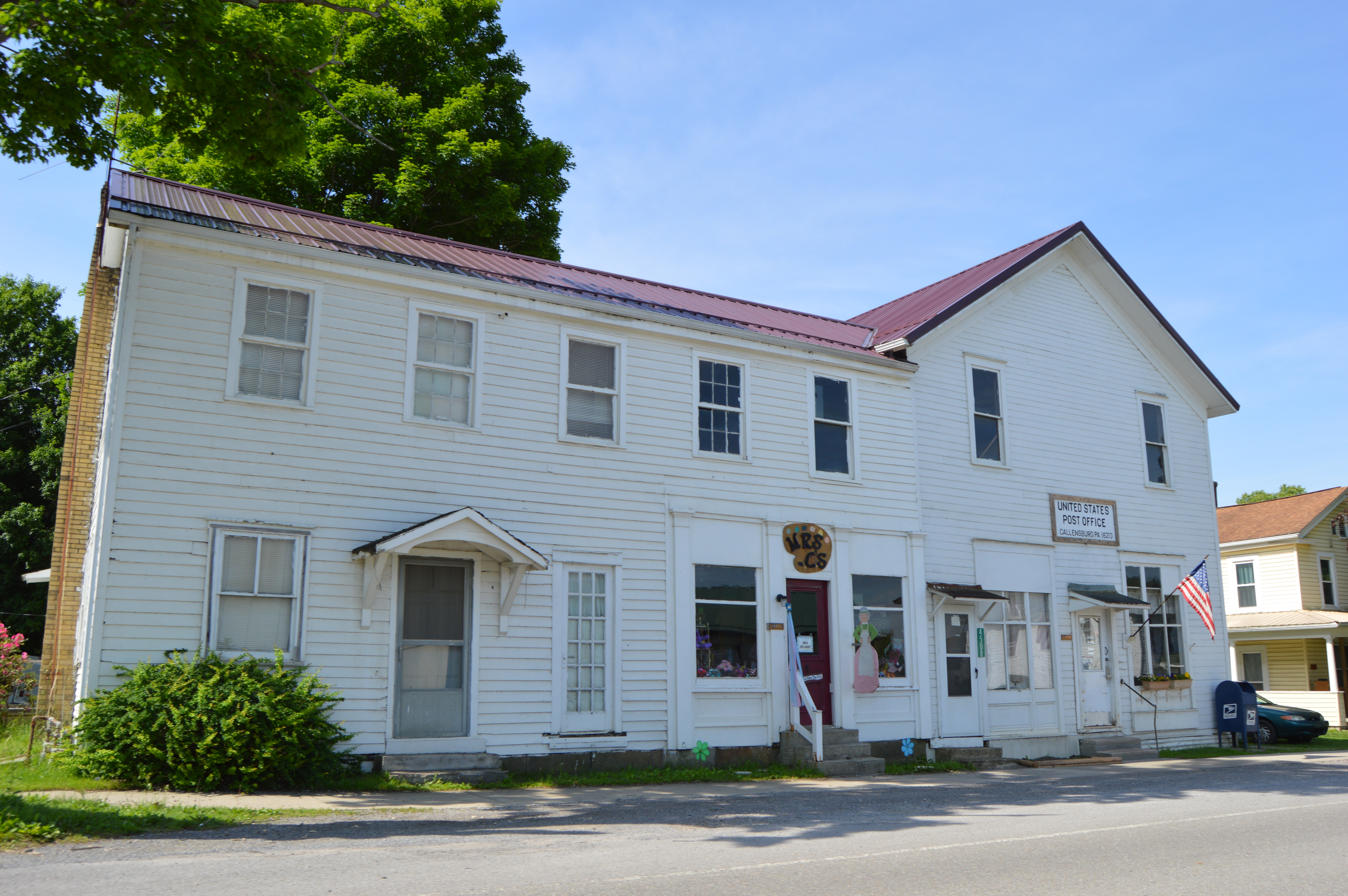
- Post office and adjacent store

- Location of Callensburg in Clarion County, Pennsylvania.

- Map showing Clarion County in Pennsylvania

- Location within Pennsylvania
- Coordinates: 41°07′33″N 79°33′28″W
- Country: United States
- State: Pennsylvania
- County: Clarion
- Settled: 1826
- Incorporated: 1851

Government
  - Type: Borough Council

Area
  - Total: 0.14 sq mi (0.37 km^{2})
  - Land: 0.14 sq mi (0.37 km^{2})
  - Water: 0 sq mi (0.00 km^{2})
- Elevation: 1,110 ft (340 m)

Population (2020)
  - Total: 150
  - Density: 1,037.7/sq mi (400.65/km^{2})
- Time zone: UTC-5 (Eastern (EST))
  - Summer (DST): UTC-4 (EDT)
- ZIP code: 16213
- FIPS code: 42-10792

Callensburg is a borough in Clarion County, Pennsylvania, United States. As of the 2020 census, Callensburg had a population of 150.

== Geography ==
Callensburg is located in western Clarion County at 41°7′33″N 79°33′28″W (41.125698, -79.557682). It is situated on a hill overlooking the confluence of Licking Creek with the Clarion River, part of the Allegheny River watershed.

Pennsylvania Route 368 passes through the center of Callensburg, leading west 7 miles (11 km) to Parker on the Allegheny River. Just east of Callensburg, PA 368 ends at Pennsylvania Route 58, which leads east 3 miles (5 km) to Sligo and northwest 7 miles (11 km) to St. Petersburg, which is 2 miles (3 km) south of Interstate 80.

According to the United States Census Bureau, Callensburg has a total area of 0.2 square miles (0.4 km^{2}), all land.

== History ==
Callensburg was surveyed in 1826, by Hugh Callen Sr., who commissioned a young surveyor named Sidle Lobaugh to lay out a town on part of the 300 acres he had purchased in 1812. Callen anticipated the building of the Pennsylvania Canal through that region, and while the eventual route of the canal did not pass near Callensburg, the area still attracted enough settlers to form a borough. It was incorporated in 1851, and held the first town election on March 21, 1851.

In laying out the town, Mr. Callen reserved three acres for building a Presbyterian Church and cemetery, and deeded an open lot north of Main street, where the town spring was located, to the town. He built his house south of Licking Township, where local legend claimed there was a large poplar tree:

"This tree grew from a twig used by Mr. Callen as a riding whip. On his return from church at Concord one Sunday he stuck the whip into the ground, and this lone poplar stands today as a monument to the piety of him who planted it."

== Demographics ==
Historical population
Census	Pop.	Note	%±
1860	319		—
1870	255		−20.1%
1880	277		8.6%
1890	241		−13.0%
1900	248		2.9%
1910	198		−20.2%
1920	215		8.6%
1930	208		−3.3%
1940	280		34.6%
1950	261		−6.8%
1960	280		7.3%
1970	249		−11.1%
1980	248		−0.4%
1990	205		−17.3%
2000	224		9.3%
2010	207		−7.6%
2020	150		−27.5%

As of the census of 2000, there were 224 people, 96 households, and 54 families residing in the borough. The population density was 1,489.9 inhabitants per square mile (575.3/km^{2}). There were 100 housing units at an average density of 665.1 per square mile (256.8/km^{2}). The racial makeup of the borough was 99.55% White, and 0.45% from two or more races. Hispanic or Latino of any race were 0.89% of the population.

There were 96 households, out of which 26.0% had children under the age of 18 living with them, 46.9% were married couples living together, 7.3% had a female householder with no husband present, and 43.8% were non-families. 34.4% of all households were made up of individuals, and 17.7% had someone living alone who was 65 years of age or older. The average household size was 2.33 and the average family size was 3.20.

In the borough the population was spread out, with 22.8% under the age of 18, 11.6% from 18 to 24, 27.2% from 25 to 44, 25.4% from 45 to 64, and 12.9% who were 65 years of age or older. The median age was 37 years. For every 100 females there were 91.5 males. For every 100 females age 18 and over, there were 92.2 males.

The median income for a household in the borough was $28,000, and the median income for a family was $37,083. Males had a median income of $29,375 versus $19,583 for females. The per capita income for the borough was $13,654. About 17.3% of families and 24.3% of the population were below the poverty line, including 38.5% of those under the age of eighteen and 36.7% of those sixty five or over.

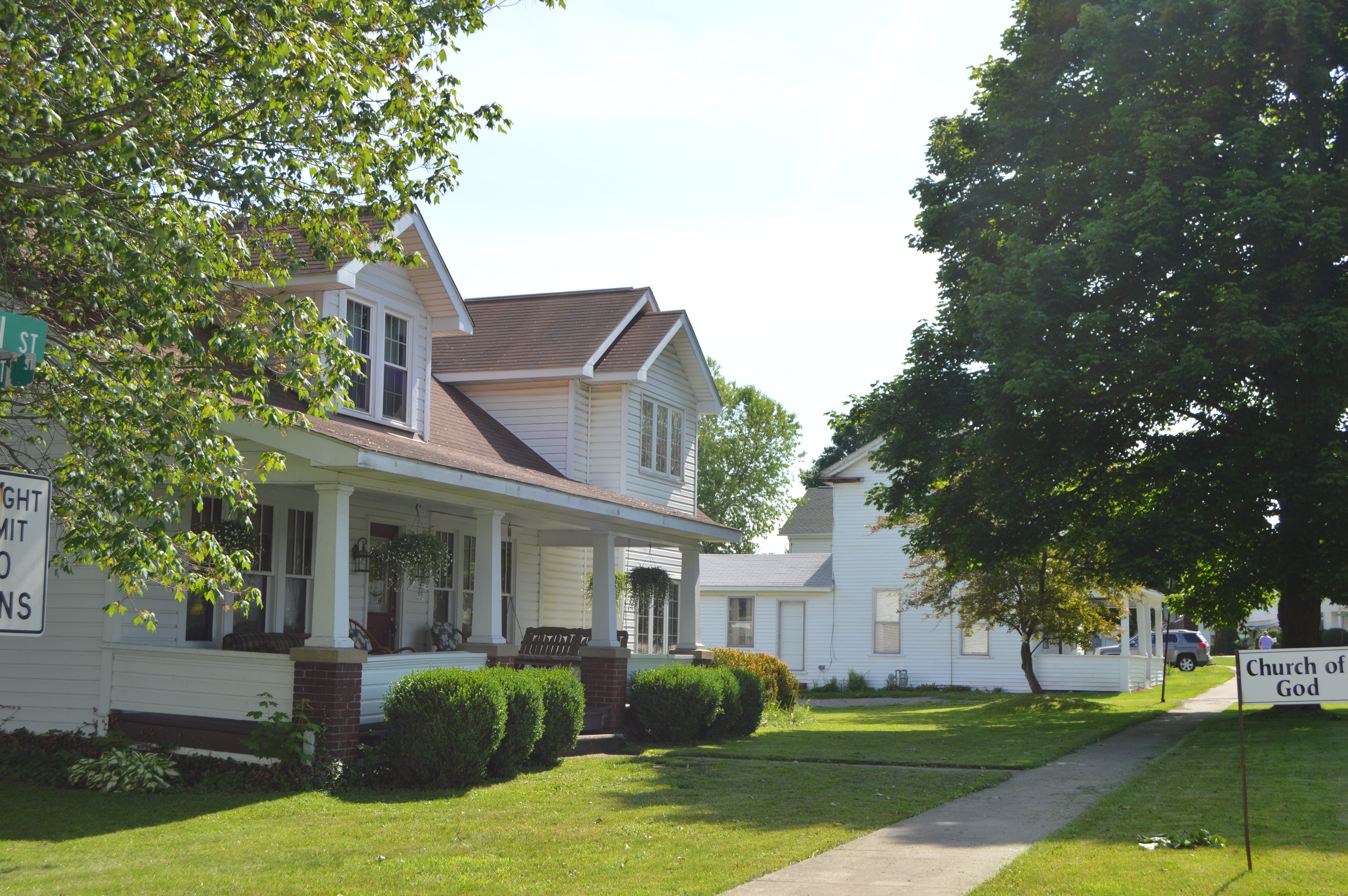
Houses on Main Street
