= Allegheny-Clarion Valley Junior/Senior High School =

Allegheny-Clarion Valley Jr./Sr. High School
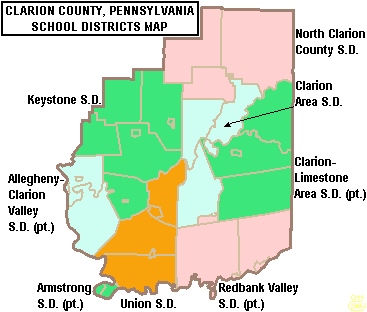

Location
- 776 Route 58; Foxburg, Pennsylvania 16036; United States; 41.14442°N 79.67555°W

Information
- Type: Public Junior/Senior High School
- School district: Allegheny-Clarion Valley School District
- Principal: William Jordan
- Staff: 15
- Faculty: 25
- Teaching staff: 20.40 (FTE)
- Grades: 7–12
- Enrollment: 275 (2023-2024)
- Student to teacher ratio: 13.48
- Colors: Blue and white
- Athletics conference: PIAA District IX /KSAC
- Team name: Falcons
- Yearbook: QUADCO
- Feeder schools: Allegheny-Clarion Valley Elementary School
- Website: www.acvsd.org/high-school

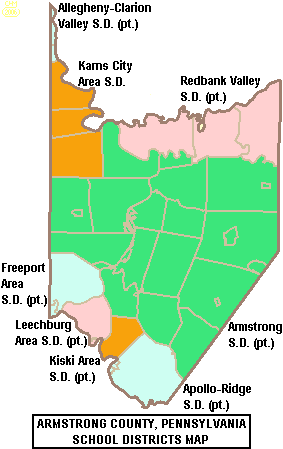
Allegheny-Clarion Valley School District region in Armstrong County

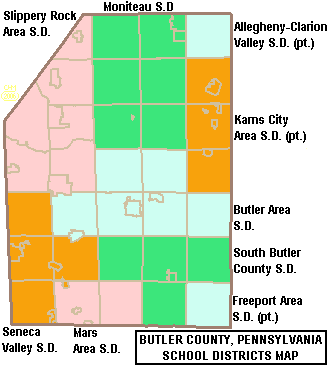
Allegheny-Clarion Valley School District region in Butler County

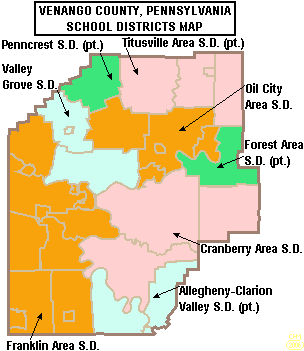
Allegheny-Clarion Valley School District region in Venango County

Allegheny-Clarion Valley Junior/Senior High School, or A-C Valley, is a rural, public high school near Foxburg, in southwestern Clarion County, Pennsylvania, United States. In 2012, the school had 368 students in grades 7th through 12th. and 40 staff Members in 2013.

Allegheny-Clarion Valley Junior Senior High School students can receive vocational training at Clarion County Career Center.

== Extracurriculars ==
The Allegheny-Clarion Valley School District offers a variety of clubs, activities and an extensive sports program. Beginning in 2016, Allegheny-Clarion Valley Junior/Senior High School entered into an athletic co-op agreement with Union Junior/Senior High School with regard to football, cross country, and golf. Under the agreement, Union High School would act as the host school for football (Though games are expected to be played at both schools evenly), while A-C is the host school for golf and cross-country.

=== Athletics ===
The district funds:

Varsity

Boys

- Baseball - A
- Basketball- A
- Cross Country - A (Co-op with Union)
- Football - A (Co-op with Union)
- Golf - AA (Co-op with Union)
- Track and Field - AA

Girls

- Basketball - A
- Cheer - AAAAAA
- Cross Country - A (Co-op with Union)
- Golf - AA (Co-op with Union)
- Softball - A
- Track and Field - AA
- Volleyball - A

According to PIAA directory January 2018
