= Foxburg Bridge (1921) =

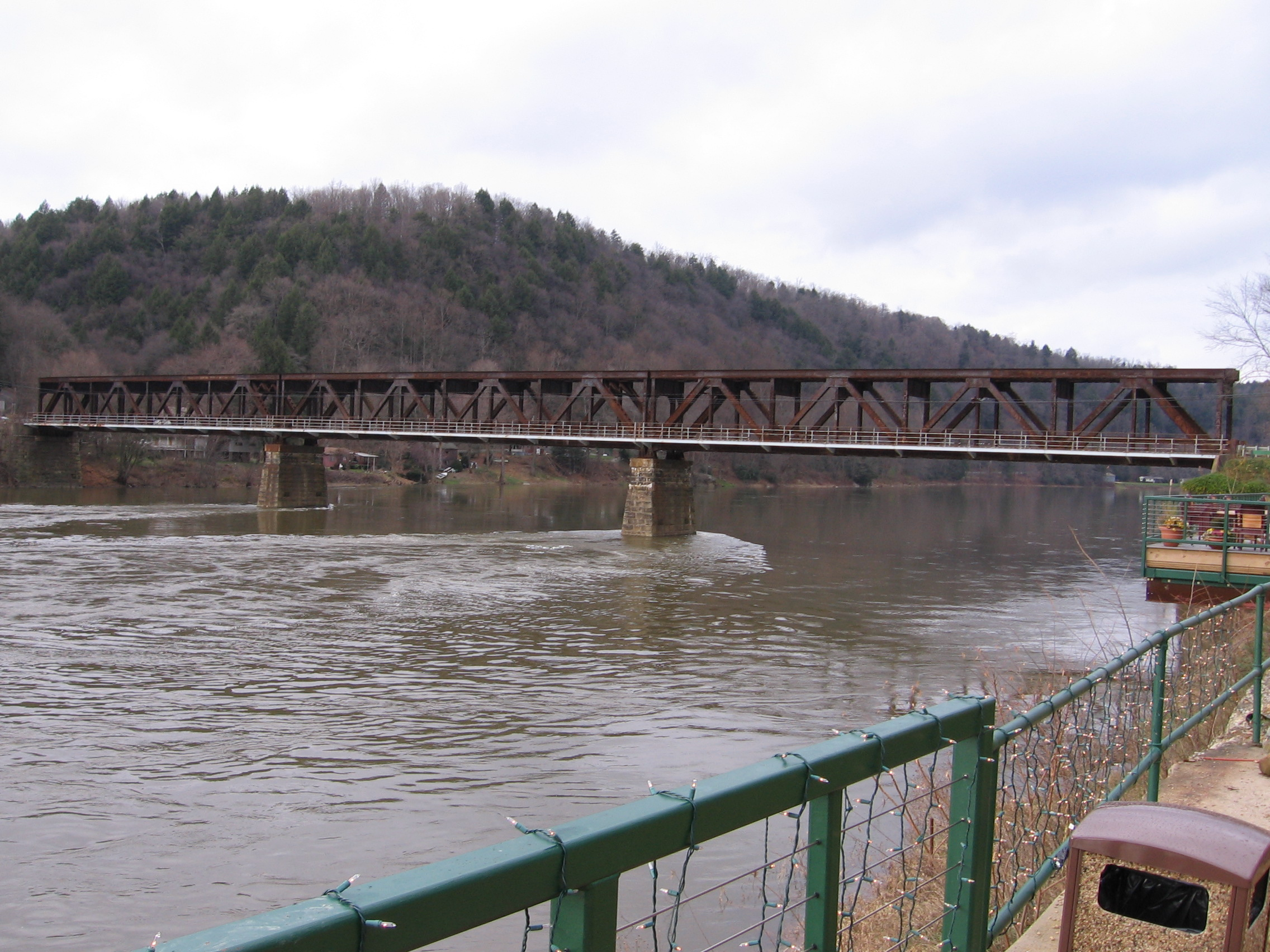
- Coordinates: 41.140°N 79.681°W
- Carries: Motor vehicles, pedestrians, PA 58, trains (1921-1964)
- Crosses: Allegheny River
- Locale: Foxburg, Pennsylvania
- Official name: Foxburg Bridge
- Other name(s): Old Foxburg Bridge

Characteristics
- Design: Truss bridge
- Material: Steel
- Width: single carriageway (road), single line (rail), stacked.
- No. of spans: 3
- Piers in water: 2

History
- Opened: October 16, 1921
- Closed: July 3, 2008 (destroyed July 24, 2008)

Statistics
- Toll: October 16, 1921 - April 1, 1926

Foxburg Bridge was a steel-built truss bridge in Foxburg, Pennsylvania. The crossing, which spanned the Allegheny River, was built by the Baltimore and Ohio Railroad in the 1920s. It originally had a two-tier design in which the top level carried a branch of Northern Subdivision railroad while the lower level was used by road traffic and pedestrians.

This bridge was the third in a series of four bridges to have crossed the Allegheny at this point between Armstrong County on the western bank with Foxburg, Clarion County, on the eastern side. Although the railroad was closed in the 1960s, the bridge remained open to vehicular traffic until July 3, 2008. It was demolished by explosive implosion on July 24, 2008.

The replacement bridge was built adjacent to the old bridge prior to its demolition.

== Predecessors ==
The first bridge was an iron bowstring arch truss completed in summer 1873 by the Wrought Iron Bridge Company of Canton, Ohio. It had a total length of 530 feet (160 m). Each of its two spans were 265 feet (81 m). They were supported by one pier in the Allegheny River. Revenues for all traffic were collected at a tollhouse.

A decade later the bridge was replaced when the Pittsburgh and Western Railroad (later part of the Baltimore and Ohio Railroad) laid a line through the area. Due to the demands of a steam haulage, the second bridge was a Howe truss type built of wood. Work began in September 1882 and was completed in April 1883. The new bridge had a two-tier design: rail traffic would pass over its upper level while horse-drawn transport and pedestrians would use the bottom. The bridge reused the abutments and tollhouse of its predecessor but its central pier was replaced with two columns in the river.

== 1921 bridge ==
The double-level steel bridge was built by the Bethlehem Steel Bridge Corporation in 1921. The bridge was constructed in three parts adjacent to the wooden bridge. Shortly after the first section was completed, the Oil City Derrick described the work on August 23, 1921:

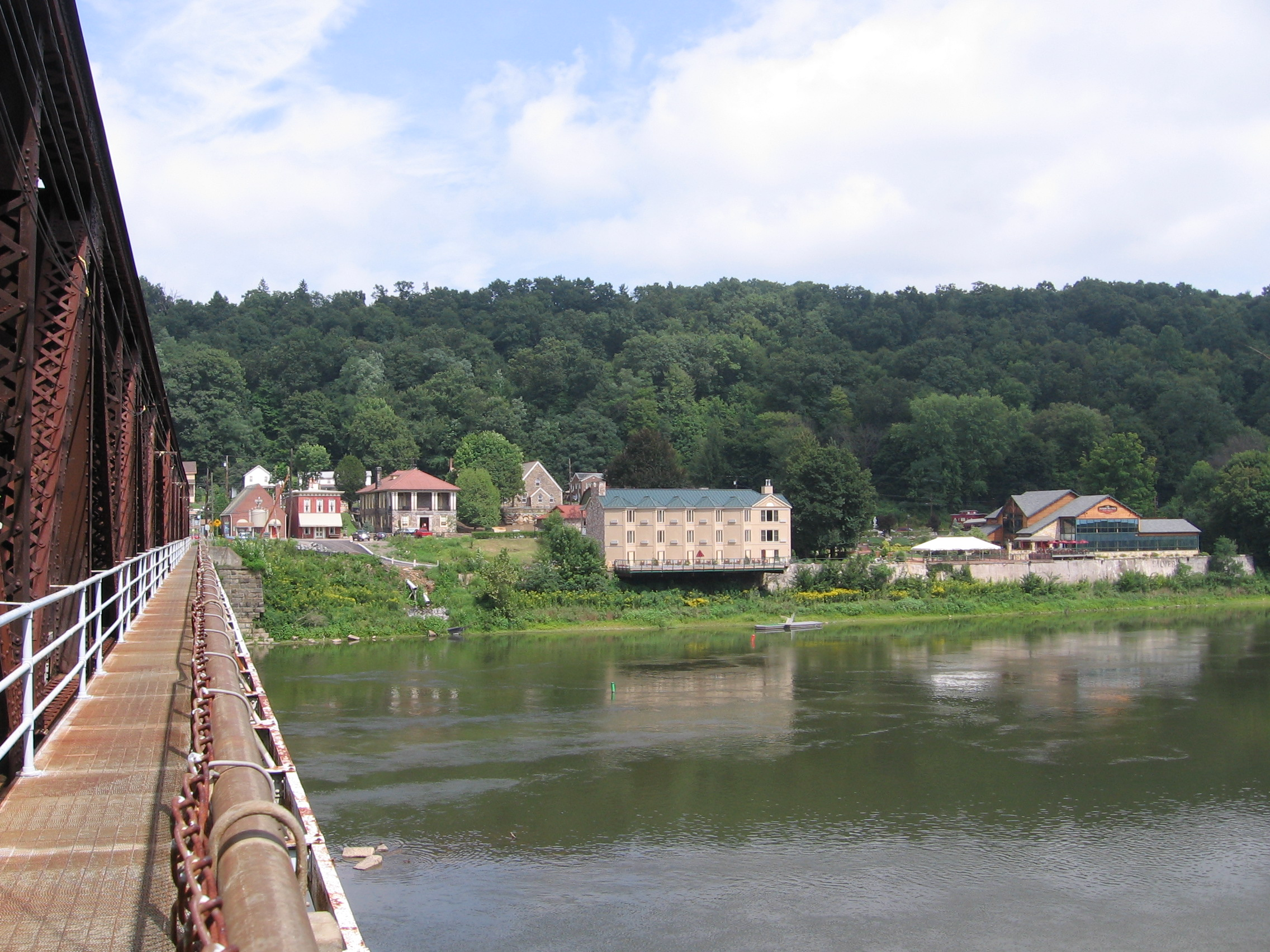
The borough of Foxburg seen from the bridge's steel-decked walkway, August 2007.

MODERN ENGINEERING ACCOMPLISHED WONDER

Foxburg, Pa. Aug 22. The substitution of a new steel span, 180 feet long and weighing 400 tons, for a section of the old double decked wooden railroad bridge over the Allegheny at this point, the work of making the change occupying an actual period of only 10 minutes, was an engineering fete witnessed early today by practically all the inhabitants of this place.

Placing of the new span was the first step in the reconstruction of the old bridge which is one of the last wooden railroad bridges left in the country. Two more spans of the same weight and dimensions as the first will be put in place, one on September 18 and the other October 16.

The method employed by the engineers in making the substitution was apparently simple. The new steel structure was built alongside of the old wooden span, false work erected on the upstream side. Similar false work was built out on the down stream side. Both old and the new structures were set on several hundred small rollers and when all was ready cables which had been rigged from two railroad cranes were attached to the steel span and the signal to pull was given.

As the new span rolled from its position it pushed the old structure from its place on the stone piers to a resting place on the false work on the down stream side. Both spans made the journey in less than 10 minutes and an hour later the bridge was ready for regular train service. The work was under the direction of P. J. Lang, bridge engineer for the Baltimore & Ohio railroad and A. C. Clark, district engineer of the same road.

The third and final section was put into place on October 16, 1921.

For more than 40 years, the bridge carried a branch of the Baltimore and Ohio Railroad's Northern Subdivision over the river. Embankments carrying the line on each side of the river were connected to the bridge by wooden trestles. The branch was closed in 1964; but the rails were not removed until the early 1990s. The route is now in the process of being converted to a rail trail. At the same time the Pennsylvania Railroad also had a line that ran through Foxburg but it too has been removed and is now in the process of becoming a long-distance walking route.

== Removal ==
The Foxburg Bridge was demolished shortly after 9:30 AM on July 24, 2008, using shaped charges. These were placed at load-bearing points on the bridge causing it to collapse in on itself. The demolition featured in an episode of The Detonators on the Discovery Channel. The iron work and the piers were removed shortly afterwards.
