= Foxburg Bridge (2008) =

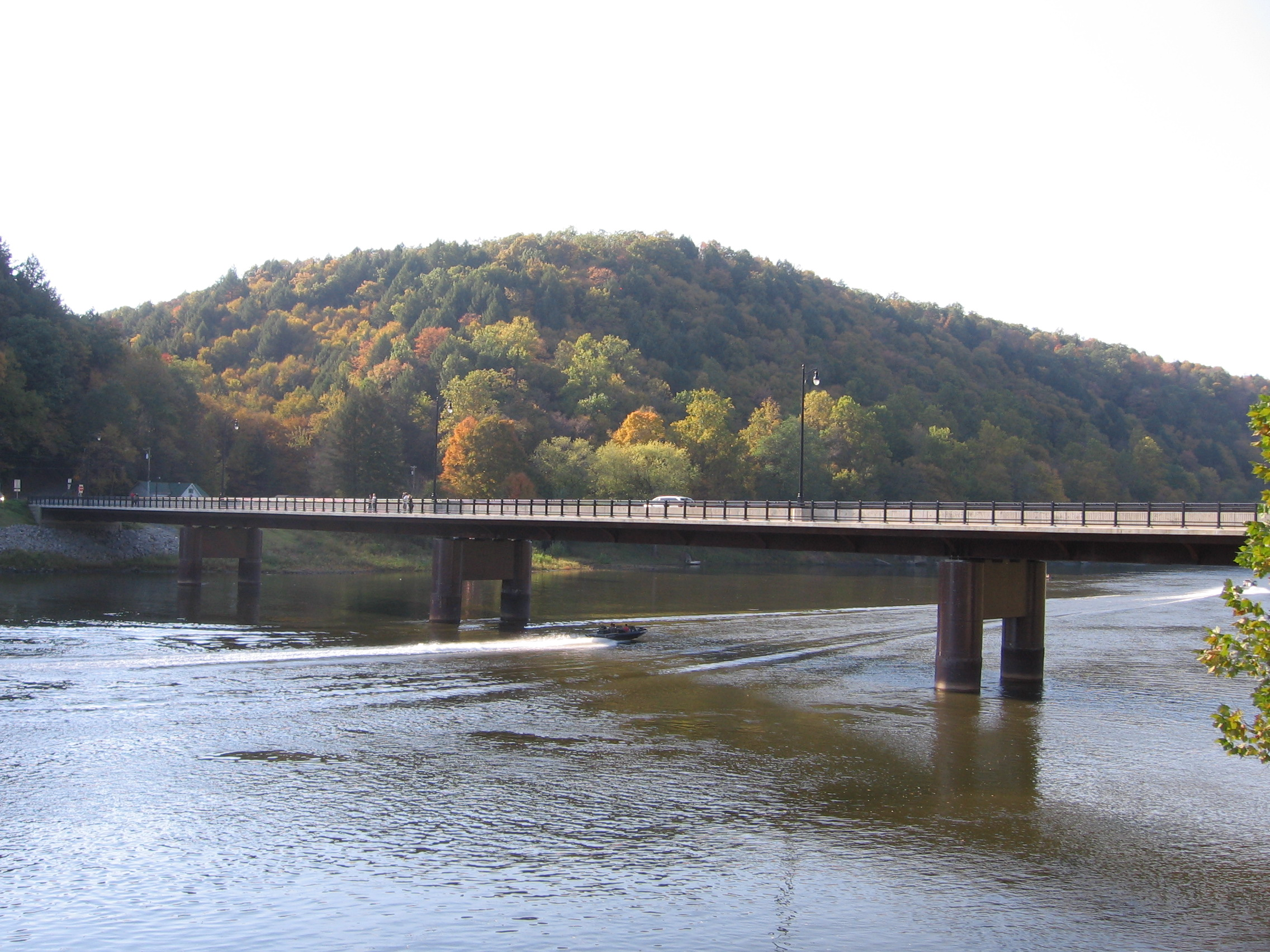
- The Foxburg Bridge on 10/10/2010 during the Foxburg Fall Festival
- Coordinates: 41.140°N 79.681°W
- Carries: 2 lanes of PA 58
- Crosses: Allegheny River
- Locale: Foxburg, Pennsylvania
- Official name: Foxburg Bridge
- Other name(s): New Foxburg Bridge
- Maintained by: PennDOT

Characteristics
- Design: multi-girder bridge
- Material: Steel
- No. of spans: 4
- Piers in water: 3

History
- Constructed by: Beech Construction, Carnegie, Pennsylvania
- Opened: July 2, 2008

The Foxburg Bridge carries PA 58 over the Allegheny River between Armstrong County, Pennsylvania and Clarion County, Pennsylvania in Foxburg, Pennsylvania, USA.

== History ==
The new bridge was completed alongside the old Foxburg Bridge which was demolished to allow the pedestrian walkway to be added. The project began in 2007 and was due to end in 2009 but the bridge opened to traffic ahead of schedule. The cost of the project was $10.1 million.

== See also ==
- List of crossings of the Allegheny River
