= Pittsburgh and Western Railroad =

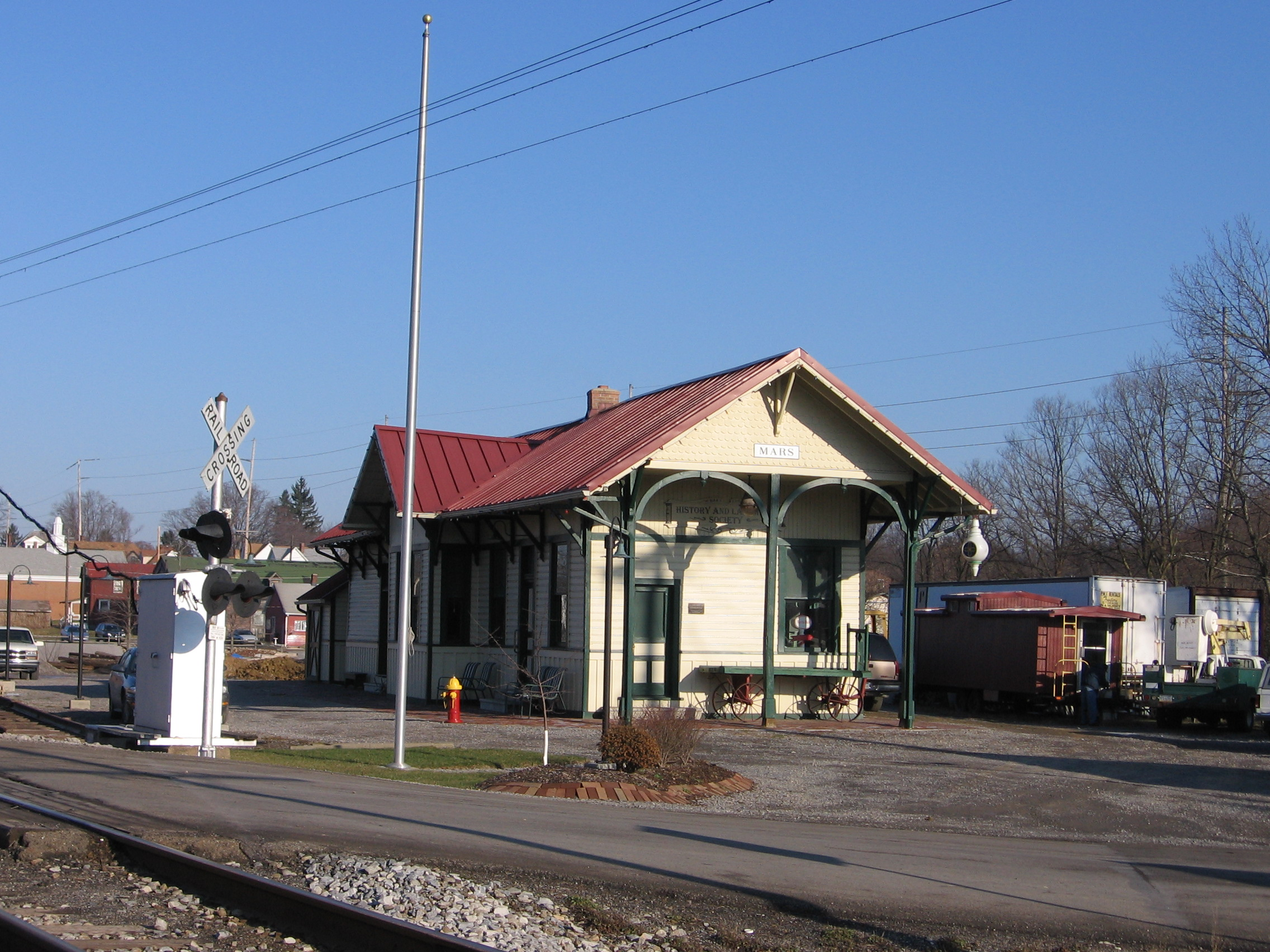
- The Mars railroad station in Mars, Pennsylvania, is one of the last stations still standing that was built by the P&W Railroad.

Overview
- Headquarters: Pittsburgh, Pennsylvania
- Locale: Northwestern Pennsylvania
- Dates of operation: 1873–1911
- Successor: Baltimore and Ohio Railroad

Technical
- Track gauge: 4 ft 8 1/2 in (1,435 mm) standard gauge
- Previous gauge: originally 3 ft (914 mm) gauge
- Length: 200 miles (320 km) (approximate)

The Pittsburgh and Western Railroad (reporting mark PW) was a nineteenth-century, 3 ft (914 mm) narrow gauge railroad connecting Pittsburgh with coal supplies and the oil field around Titusville, Pennsylvania. Its right-of way formed the main line of the Baltimore and Ohio Railroad west from Pittsburgh. It was reorganized in 1889 under Malcolm A. McDonald.

The railroad constructed another 3 ft (914 mm) narrow gauge line from Callery Junction to Foxburg, Pennsylvania. This line would later become known as the Northern Subdivision of the Baltimore and Ohio Railroad (B&O). In 1883, upon the financially failure of the Pittsburgh, Bradford and Buffalo Railroad, the railroad took control of its line from Foxburg to Mount Jewett. The railroad would later merge with the Bradford, Bordell and Kinzua Railroad, which ran from Bradford to Smethport with a branch to Bordell at Kinzua, and the Big Level and Kinzua Railroad, which extended the PW to the BB&K at Ormsby. These mergers would prove to be ineffective; by 1902 these joint railways were in financial ruin.

The Bradford, Bordell and Kinzua Railroad handled significant interchange traffic with standard gauge lines by use of truck exchange. Cars were hoisted at interchange points and trucks were rolled out and replaced with new ones of the appropriate gauge. On at least one occasion, the blocking used to adapt a standard-gauge car to narrow gauge trucks failed, leading to a fatal accident.

In 1902, the Baltimore and Ohio Railroad (B&O) took control of the P&W, while the rest of the BB&K lines were largely abandoned. By 1911, the P&W was dissolved, and the B&O took over all operations. That same year, most of the narrow gauge was converted to 4 ft 8 1/2 in (1,435 mm) standard gauge track. The B&O would continue to operate the line until 1982 when it was acquired by Sloan Cornell of the Knox and Kane Railroad.

Trackage between Ribold and Butler, Pennsylvania, as well as the Petrolia Branch is used by the Buffalo and Pittsburgh Railroad. The Clarion Junction-Kane section ceased operations in 2006; it was abandoned in 2008 when the Knox and Kane Railroad was sold at auction.

== See also ==
- Northern Subdivision (Pennsylvania)
- P&W Subdivision
