= Parker Bridge =

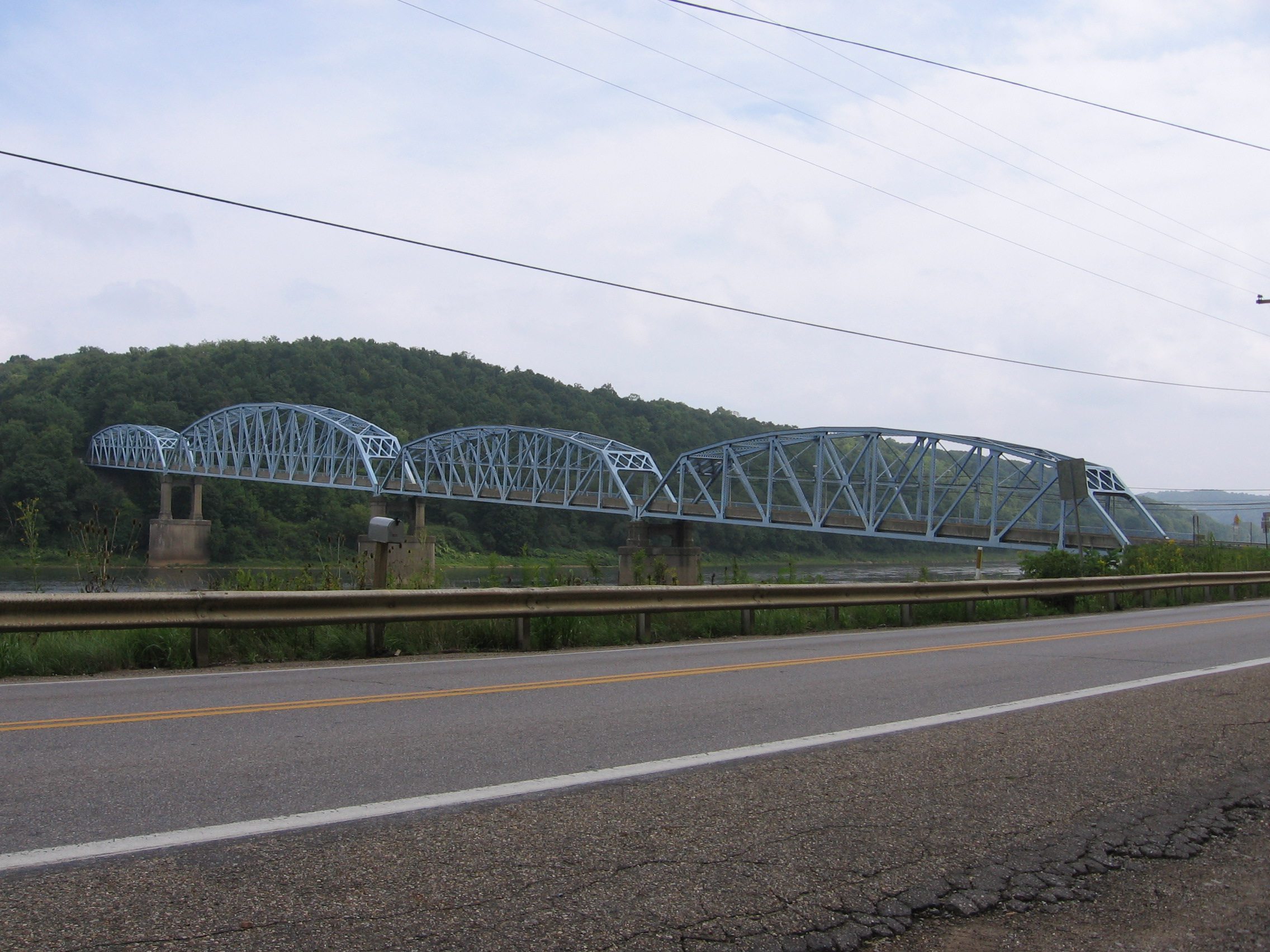
- Coordinates: 41.1020°N 79.6795°W
- Carries: PA 368, pedestrians
- Crosses: Allegheny River
- Locale: Parker, Pennsylvania

Characteristics
- Design: Truss bridge
- Material: Steel
- Total length: 1,140 feet (350 m)
- Width: 24.9 feet (7.6 m)
- Piers in water: 3

History
- Opened: 1934

Parker Bridge is a truss bridge in the city of Parker, Pennsylvania, United States. The bridge, constructed in 1934, carries motor vehicles and pedestrians over the Allegheny River. The Parker Bridge is a variation of the Pratt truss bridge, a design invented by the late Charles H. Parker in the 20th century.

== See also ==
- List of crossings of the Allegheny River
