= Licking Township, Pennsylvania =

Township in Pennsylvania, US

Coordinates: 41°08′16″N 79°33′13″W

Licking Township, Clarion County, Pennsylvania
- Township
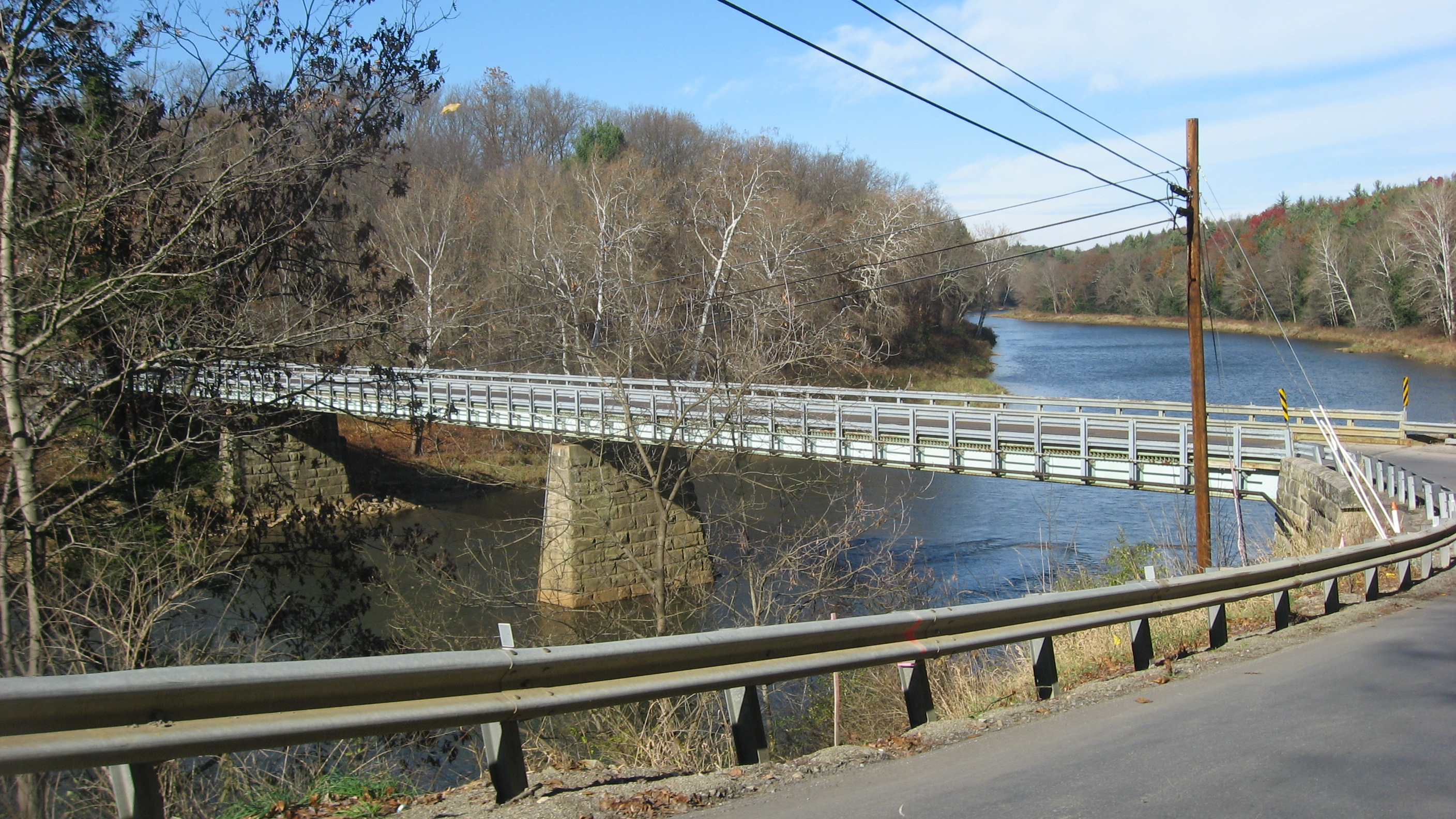
- Bridge over the Clarion River north of Callensburg

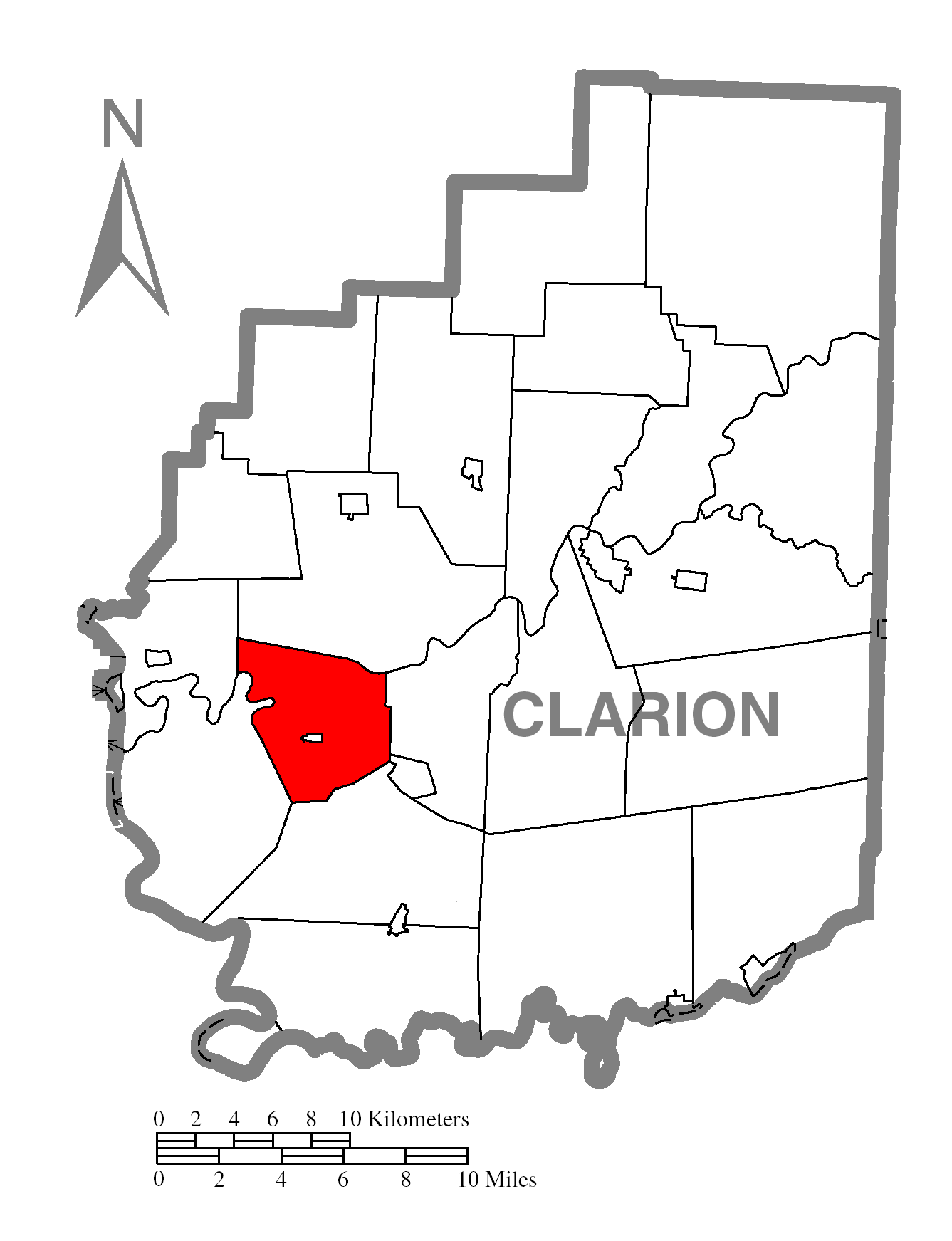
- Map of Clarion County, Pennsylvania highlighting Licking Township

- Map of Clarion County, Pennsylvania
- Country: United States
- State: Pennsylvania
- County: Clarion
- Incorporated: 1804

Area
  - Total: 17.92 sq mi (46.42 km^{2})
  - Land: 17.52 sq mi (45.38 km^{2})
  - Water: 0.40 sq mi (1.04 km^{2})

Population (2020)
  - Total: 573 ▲
  - Estimate (2022): 566
  - Density: 32.7/sq mi (12.6/km^{2})
- Time zone: UTC-5 (Eastern (EST))
  - Summer (DST): UTC-4 (EDT)
- FIPS code: 42-031-43192

Licking Township is a township that is located in Clarion County, Pennsylvania, United States. The population was 573 at the time of the 2020 census, an increase from the figure of 536 tabulated in 2010.

== Geography ==
The township is located in western Clarion County. The Clarion River winds through the township, forming part of the northern border and part of the western border but also bending southwards to pass through the center of the township, past the borough of Callensburg, a separate municipality surrounded by the township. Licking Creek joins the Clarion River at Callensburg.

According to the United States Census Bureau, the township has a total area of 17.9 square miles (46.4 km^{2}), of which 17.5 square miles (45.4 km^{2}) is land and 0.39 square miles (1.0 km^{2}), or 2.24%, is water.

== Demographics ==
Historical population
Census	Pop.	Note	%±
2010	536		—
2020	573		6.9%
2022 (est.)	566		−1.2%
U.S. Decennial Census

As of the census of 2000, there were 479 people, 183 households, and 135 families residing in the township.

The population density was 27.5 inhabitants per square mile (10.6/km^{2}). There were 235 housing units at an average density of 13.5/sq mi (5.2/km^{2}).

The racial makeup of the township was 99.16% White, 0.21% African American, and 0.63% from two or more races.

There were 183 households, out of which 29.5% had children under the age of eighteen living with them; 59.6% were married couples living together, 9.3% had a female householder with no husband present, and 25.7% were non-families. 21.9% of all households were made up of individuals, and 9.3% had someone living alone who was sixty-five years of age or older.

The average household size was 2.62 and the average family size was 2.98.

Within the township, the population was spread out, with 24.6% of residents who were under the age of eighteen, 9.8% who were aged eighteen to twenty-four, 26.7% who were aged twenty-five to forty-four, 24.6% who were aged forty-five to sixty-four, and 14.2% who were sixty-five years of age or older. The median age was thirty-seven years.

For every one hundred females there were 103.8 males. For every one hundred females who were aged eighteen or older, there were 108.7 males.

The median income for a household in the township was $27,708, and the median income for a family was $33,250. Males had a median income of $29,444 compared with that of $15,500 for females.

The per capita income for the township was $15,553.

Approximately 15.1% of families and 18.0% of the population were living below the poverty line, including 24.8% of those who were under the age of eighteen and 12.3% of those who were aged sixty-five or older.
