= Parker, Pennsylvania =

City in Pennsylvania, US

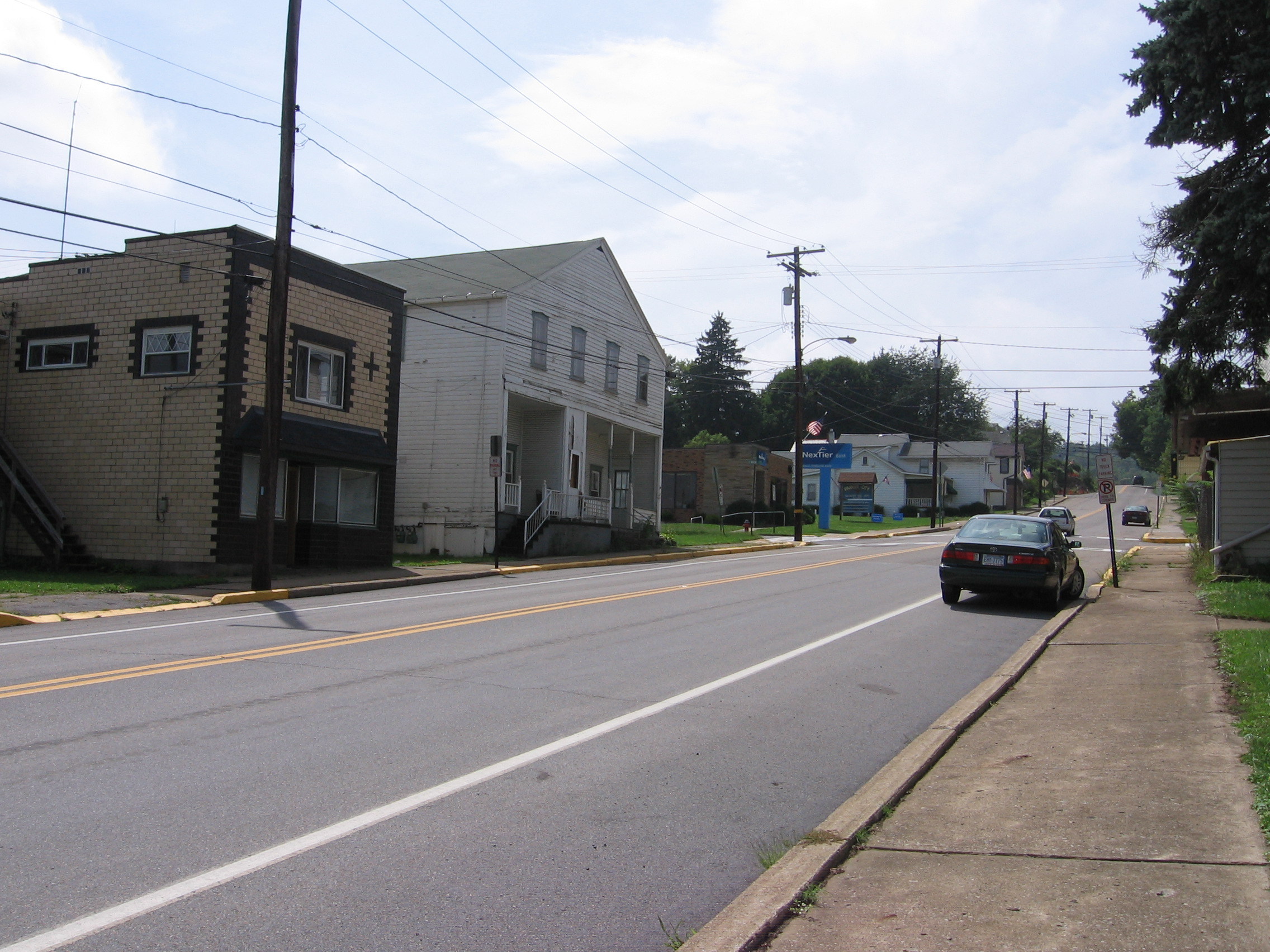
- The Old Lawrenceburg section of Parker
- Nickname: Smallest City in the U.S.A.
- Location of Parker in Armstrong County, Pennsylvania.

- Location in the state of Pennsylvania
- Coordinates: 41°5′39″N 79°40′58″W
- Country: United States
- State: Pennsylvania
- County: Armstrong County
- Settled: 1797
- Incorporated: 1873

Government
  - Mayor: William R. McCall Jr.

Area
  - Total: 0.96 sq mi (2.48 km^{2})
  - Land: 0.96 sq mi (2.48 km^{2})
  - Water: 0 sq mi (0.00 km^{2})

Population (2020)
  - Total: 695
  - Density: 726.7/sq mi (280.58/km^{2})
- Time zone: UTC-5 (EST)
  - Summer (DST): UTC-4 (EDT)
- ZIP code: 16049
- Area code: 724
- FIPS code: 42-57976
- Website: www.visitparker.us/index.html

Parker is a city located in Armstrong County, Pennsylvania, United States. It is in the extreme northwestern portion of the county. The population was 695 at the 2020 census. The city was named for Judge John Parker, a lead surveyor of Lawrenceburg and founder/owner of Parker's Landing, the two villages combined to create Parker.

Parker is sometimes referred to as the "Smallest City in the USA". Parker was incorporated as a city on March 1, 1873, by special state legislation in the midst of the northwestern Pennsylvania oil boom. The new municipality was called "Parker" and made up the earlier villages of Parker's Landing (on the Allegheny River) and Lawrenceburg (on the bluff above the river). Residents assumed that Parker would quickly become a major population center, and at the height of the oil boom, the population of Parker grew to over 20,000. The boom quickly went bust, however, and by the 1880s the "city" returned to its historic small village size—a population of approximately 1,000.

Parker received national attention again in 2014 when a massive ice jam along the Allegheny River formed and started some minor flooding. The jam was so massive that it attracted tourists to the area, and a local bar even named a drink after the ice jam. The ice jam was severe enough that the National Weather Service issued a flood warning for the area in case the ice started melting.

== Transportation ==
=== Roads ===
There are two highways that pass through Parker. From the east, PA 268 goes right through downtown, then proceeds north towards Foxburg and Emlenton. There is also an intersection with PA 368 at the Parker Bridge.

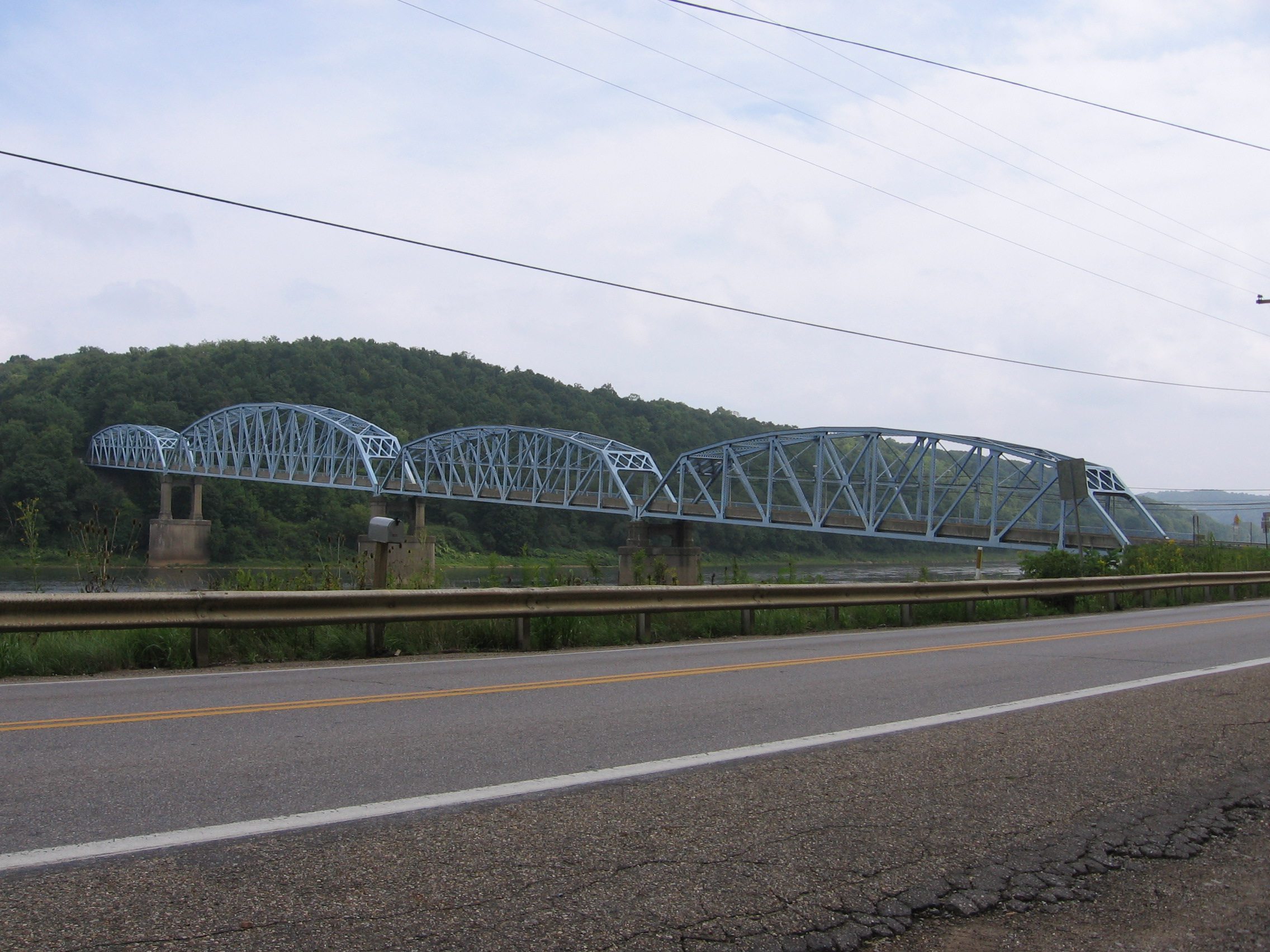
Parker Bridge

=== Waterways ===
The Allegheny River, at this point, is not used to transport goods and materials, but is still a navigable waterway for boating. The first lock, Allegheny River Lock and Dam No. 9, is located south of Parker, just past the borough of East Brady.

== Geography ==
Parker is located at 41°5′39″N 79°40′58″W (41.090639, -79.684590).

According to the United States Census Bureau, the city has a total area of 0.956 square miles (2.48 km^{2}), all of which is land.

== Surrounding and adjacent neighborhoods ==
Parker has two land borders, with the townships of Hovey to the north and Perry to the south. Across the Allegheny River to the east, Parker runs adjacent with Clarion County's Perry Township with a direct connection via Parker Bridge.

== Demographics ==
Historical population
Census	Pop.	Note	%±
1880	1,835		—
1890	1,317		−28.2%
1900	1,070		−18.8%
1910	1,244		16.3%
1920	1,188		−4.5%
1930	902		−24.1%
1940	976		8.2%
1950	979		0.3%
1960	945		−3.5%
1970	843		−10.8%
1980	808		−4.2%
1990	853		5.6%
2000	799		−6.3%
2010	840		5.1%
2020	695		−17.3%

=== 2020 census ===
As of the 2020 census, Parker had a population of 695. The median age was 46.8 years. 19.6% of residents were under the age of 18 and 21.7% of residents were 65 years of age or older. For every 100 females there were 93.6 males, and for every 100 females age 18 and over there were 89.5 males age 18 and over.

0.0% of residents lived in urban areas, while 100.0% lived in rural areas.

There were 298 households in Parker, of which 26.8% had children under the age of 18 living in them. Of all households, 41.9% were married-couple households, 21.8% were households with a male householder and no spouse or partner present, and 26.5% were households with a female householder and no spouse or partner present. About 32.6% of all households were made up of individuals and 18.8% had someone living alone who was 65 years of age or older.

There were 345 housing units, of which 13.6% were vacant. The homeowner vacancy rate was 4.4% and the rental vacancy rate was 8.8%.

Racial composition as of the 2020 census
Race	Number	Percent
White	667	96.0%
Black or African American	1	0.1%
American Indian and Alaska Native	0	0.0%
Asian	1	0.1%
Native Hawaiian and Other Pacific Islander	0	0.0%
Some other race	5	0.7%
Two or more races	21	3.0%
Hispanic or Latino (of any race)	9	1.3%

=== 2000 census ===
As of the 2000 census, there were 799 people, 309 households, and 221 families residing in the city. The population density was 728.6 inhabitants per square mile (281.3/km^{2}). There were 356 housing units at an average density of 324.6 per square mile (125.3/km^{2}). The racial makeup of the city was 98.12% White and 1.88% African American.

There were 309 households, out of which 32.4% had children under the age of 18 living with them, 58.9% were married couples living together, 8.7% had a female householder with no husband present, and 28.2% were non-families. 25.2% of all households were made up of individuals, and 15.9% had someone living alone who was 65 years of age or older. The average household size was 2.59 and the average family size was 3.09.

In the city, the population was spread out, with 26.0% under the age of 18, 10.1% from 18 to 24, 26.0% from 25 to 44, 21.2% from 45 to 64, and 16.6% who were 65 years of age or older. The median age was 36 years. For every 100 females, there were 95.4 males. For every 100 females age 18 and over, there were 89.4 males.

The median income for a household in the city was $29,844, and the median income for a family was $35,250. Males had a median income of $28,750 versus $21,875 for females. The per capita income for the city was $14,627. About 10.2% of families and 9.8% of the population were below the poverty line, including 9.7% of those under age 18 and 9.0% of those age 65 or over.

== History ==
A post office called Parker's Landing was established in 1871. In 1894, its name was changed to Parkers Landing and in 1950, the name was changed to Parker. It remains in operation to the present. Parker appears in the 1876 Atlas of Armstrong County, Pennsylvania.

== Cemeteries ==
- Grand Army of the Republic Cemetery
- Parker Presbyterian Cemetery
