= Sligo, Pennsylvania =

Borough in Pennsylvania, US

- Borough
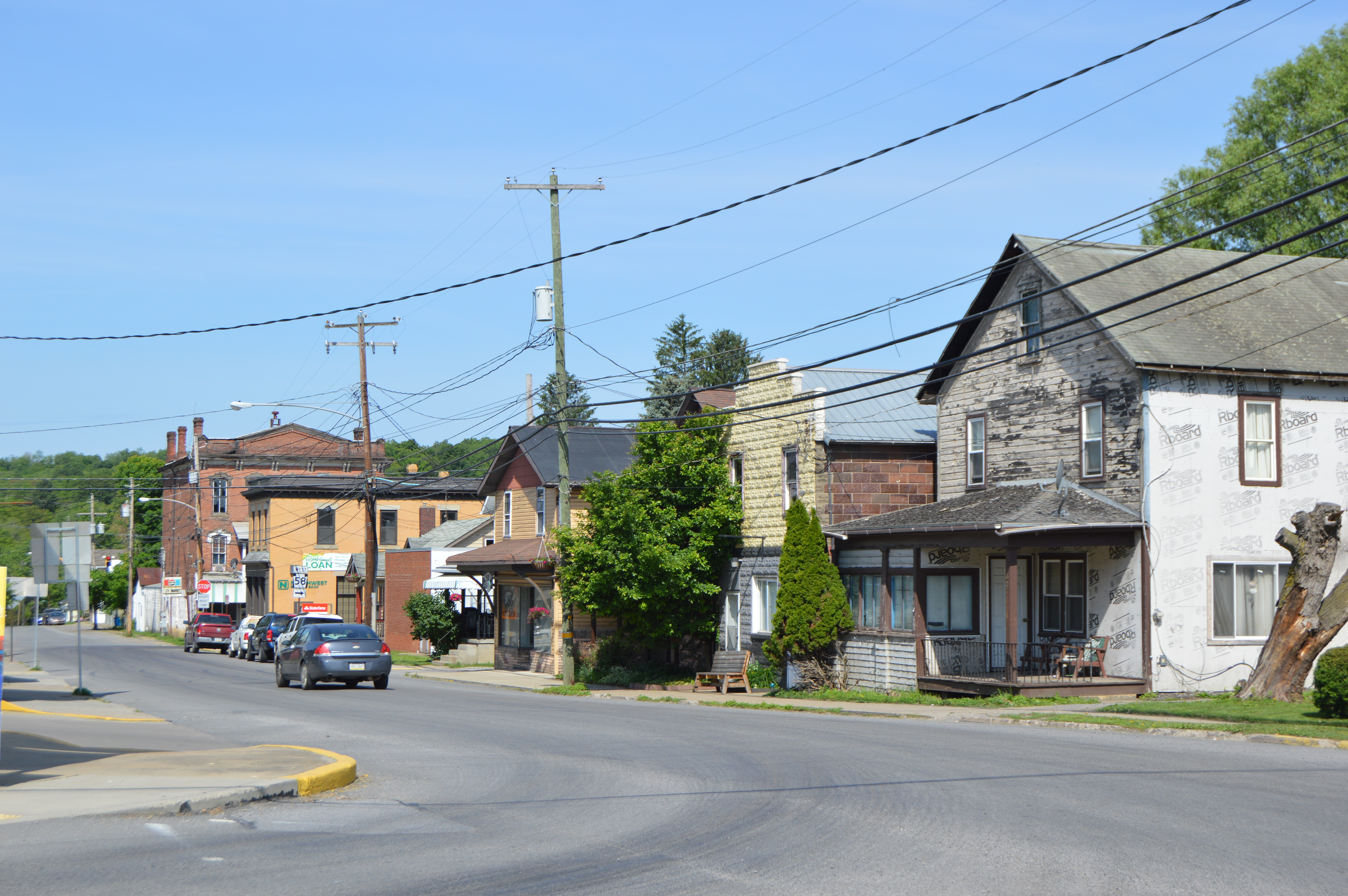
- Bald Eagle Street downtown

- Location of Sligo in Clarion County, Pennsylvania.

- Map showing Clarion County in Pennsylvania

- Location within Pennsylvania
- Coordinates: 41°06′28″N 79°29′36″W
- Country: United States
- State: Pennsylvania
- County: Clarion
- Settled: 1828
- Incorporated: 1878

Government
  - Type: Borough Council
  - Mayor: Jeremy Shumaker
  - President: Lyle Foringer
  - Vice President: Chuck Marsh

Area
  - Total: 1.41 sq mi (3.65 km^{2})
  - Land: 1.41 sq mi (3.64 km^{2})
  - Water: 0.0039 sq mi (0.01 km^{2})
- Elevation: 1,150 ft (350 m)

Population (2020)
  - Total: 681
  - Density: 484.0/sq mi (186.88/km^{2})
- Time zone: UTC-5 (Eastern (EST))
  - Summer (DST): UTC-4 (EDT)
- ZIP code: 16255
- Area code: 814
- FIPS code: 42-71176
- Website: http://www.sligoborough.com/

Sligo (/ˈslaɪɡoʊ/ SLY-goh) is a borough in Clarion County, Pennsylvania, United States. The population was 686 at the 2020 census.

It was named after the town of Sligo in Ireland.

== Geography ==
Sligo is located in southwestern Clarion County at 41°6′28″N 79°29′36″W (41.107700, -79.493350), in the valley of Licking Creek, a tributary of the Clarion River. The borough is surrounded by rolling hills. Formerly, the area sat upon a rich vein of coal.

Pennsylvania Route 68 passes through the borough, leading northeast 11 miles (18 km) to Clarion, the county seat, and southwest 13 miles (21 km) to East Brady on the Allegheny River. Pennsylvania Route 58 leads west from Sligo 13 miles (21 km) to Foxburg on the Allegheny.

According to the United States Census Bureau, the borough of Sligo has a total area of 1.4 square miles (3.7 km^{2}), of which 0.004 square miles (0.01 km^{2}), or 0.23%, is water.

== Demographics ==
Historical population
Census	Pop.	Note	%±
1880	543		—
1890	495		−8.8%
1900	505		2.0%
1910	754		49.3%
1920	801		6.2%
1930	750		−6.4%
1940	948		26.4%
1950	913		−3.7%
1960	814		−10.8%
1970	825		1.4%
1980	798		−3.3%
1990	706		−11.5%
2000	728		3.1%
2010	720		−1.1%
2020	681		−5.4%
2021 (est.)	685	▲	0.6%

As of the census of 2000, there were 728 people, 280 households, and 211 families residing in the borough. The population density was 509.9 inhabitants per square mile (196.9/km^{2}). There were 300 housing units at an average density of 210.1 per square mile (81.1/km^{2}). The racial makeup of the borough was 97.39% White, 0.69% Native American, 0.14% Asian, 0.96% from other races, and 0.82% from two or more races. Hispanic or Latino of any race were 1.10% of the population.

There were 280 households, out of which 38.6% had children under the age of 18 living with them, 58.6% were married couples living together, 14.6% had a female householder with no husband present, and 24.6% were non-families. 21.1% of all households were made up of individuals, and 10.4% had someone living alone who was 65 years of age or older. The average household size was 2.60 and the average family size was 3.00.

In the borough the population was spread out, with 27.5% under the age of 18, 10.0% from 18 to 24, 26.1% from 25 to 44, 21.6% from 45 to 64, and 14.8% who were 65 years of age or older. The median age was 36 years. For every 100 females there were 96.2 males. For every 100 females age 18 and over, there were 92.7 males.

The median income for a household in the borough was $30,417, and the median income for a family was $35,500. Males had a median income of $26,429 versus $21,250 for females. The per capita income for the borough was $13,807. About 15.2% of families and 17.1% of the population were below the poverty line, including 19.6% of those under age 18 and 14.8% of those age 65 or over.
