= Knox Glass Bottle Company =

American glass manufacturing company

The Knox Glass Bottle Company was an American glass manufacturing company based in Knox, Clarion County, Pennsylvania.

The great majority of the company's production was in the form of glass bottles many of which were beer bottles, milk bottles, and many glass medicine bottles in a variety of standard sizes. Bottle collectors identify the company's products through the mould numbers and distinctive letter-in-a-keystone mark on the base of the bottles.

== History ==
The founder of the Knox Glass Bottle Company was Roy Underwood (1887−1951). During its operations, from 1917 to 1968, the company acquired 16 other glassmaking companies−plants in the United States.

A lawsuit between the company and a former executive (Knox Glass Bottle Company v. Underwood, 89 So.2d 799 (Miss. 1956)) "was the first Mississippi Supreme Court case to define in detail the fiduciary duties of a corporate director and officer," according to a law firm that represented one of the parties.

The company was acquired by the Glass Container Corporation in 1968, which filed a Chapter 11 bankruptcy petition in Delaware in 1999.
