= Perry Township, Clarion County, Pennsylvania =

Township in Pennsylvania, US

Coordinates: 41°08′00″N 79°35′59″W

- Township
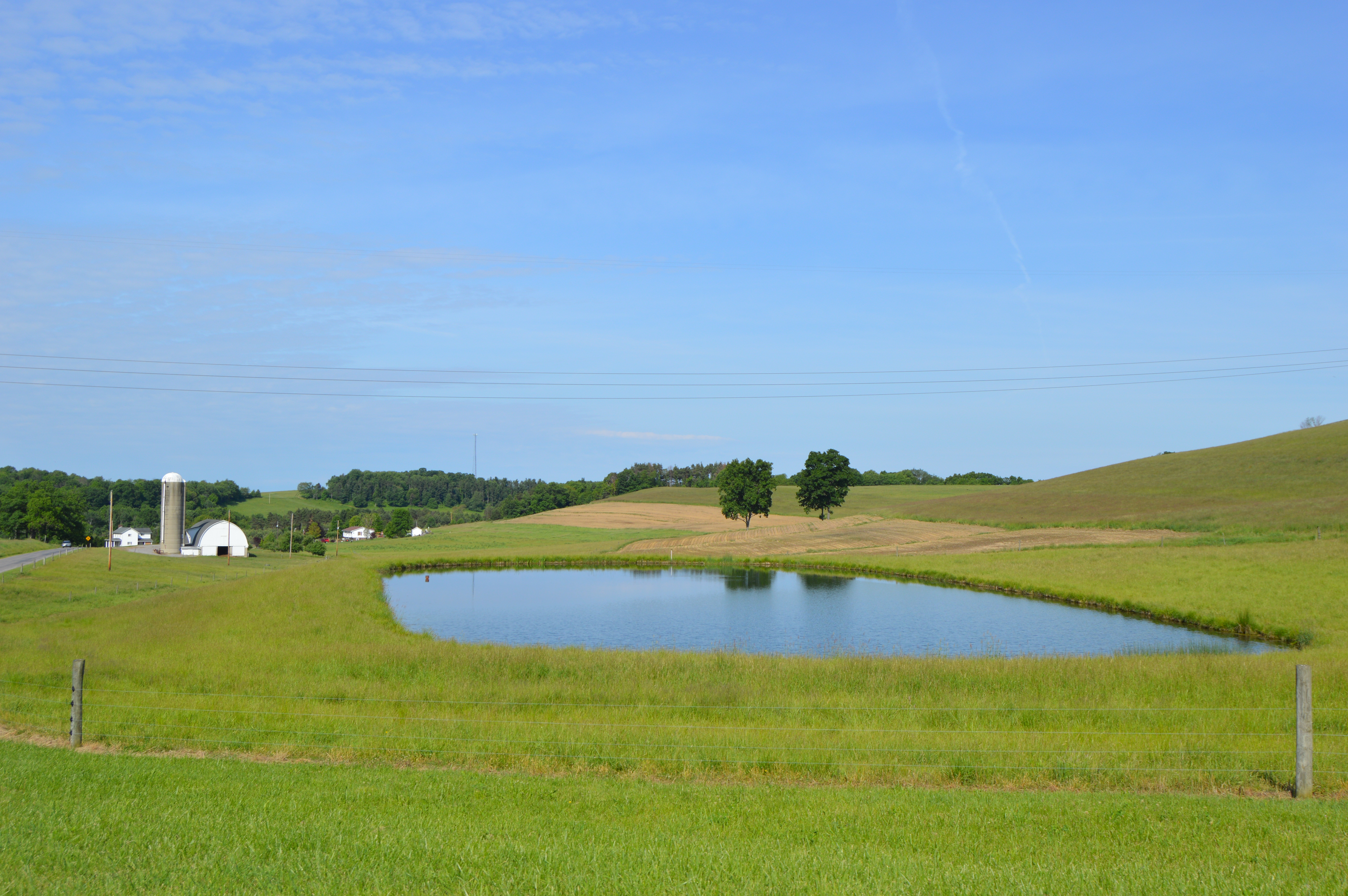
- Farmstead southwest of Callensburg

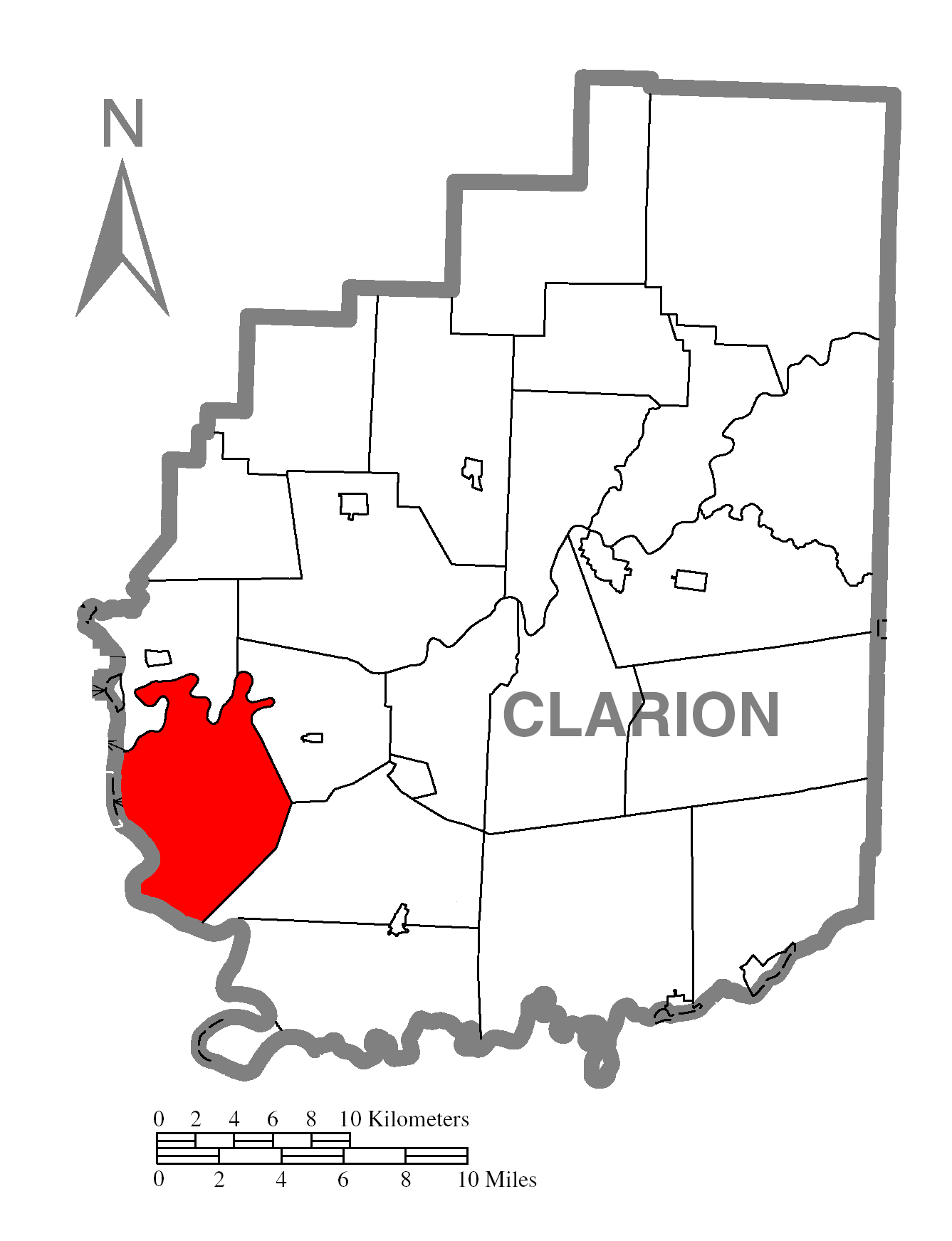
- Map of Clarion County, Pennsylvania highlighting Perry Township

- Map of Clarion County, Pennsylvania
- Country: United States
- State: Pennsylvania
- County: Clarion
- Settled: 1800

Area
  - Total: 30.14 sq mi (78.07 km^{2})
  - Land: 28.80 sq mi (74.60 km^{2})
  - Water: 1.34 sq mi (3.46 km^{2})

Population (2020)
  - Total: 922
  - Estimate (2022): 909
  - Density: 31.3/sq mi (12.08/km^{2})
- Time zone: UTC-5 (Eastern (EST))
  - Summer (DST): UTC-4 (EDT)
- FIPS code: 42-031-59456

Perry Township is a township in Clarion County, Pennsylvania, United States. The population was 922 at the 2020 census, a decrease from the figure of 947 tabulated in 2010.

== Geography ==
Perry Township is in southwestern Clarion County, bordered to the north by the Clarion River and to the west by the Allegheny River. Armstrong County is to the west across the Allegheny. The township contains the communities of Perryville, Hagantown, West Freedom, Dutch Hill, and West Monterey. Former communities, now abandoned, include Pickard Valley and Matildaville. According to the United States Census Bureau, the township has a total area of 30.2 square miles (78.1 km^{2}), of which 28.8 square miles (74.6 km^{2}) is land and 1.4 square miles (3.5 km^{2}), or 4.43%, is water.

== Demographics ==
Historical population
Census	Pop.	Note	%±
2010	947		—
2020	922		−2.6%
2022 (est.)	909		−1.4%
U.S. Decennial Census

As of the census of 2000, there were 1,064 people, 409 households, and 314 families residing in the township. The population density was 36.7 inhabitants per square mile (14.2/km^{2}). There were 539 housing units at an average density of 18.6/sq mi (7.2/km^{2}). The racial makeup of the township was 99.15% White, 0.09% Native American, 0.09% Asian, and 0.66% from two or more races. Hispanic or Latino of any race were 0.28% of the population.

There were 409 households, out of which 31.3% had children under the age of 18 living with them, 64.5% were married couples living together, 7.6% had a female householder with no husband present, and 23.2% were non-families. 18.8% of all households were made up of individuals, and 9.3% had someone living alone who was 65 years of age or older. The average household size was 2.60 and the average family size was 2.98.

In the township the population was spread out, with 24.3% under the age of 18, 6.9% from 18 to 24, 27.0% from 25 to 44, 23.9% from 45 to 64, and 18.0% who were 65 years of age or older. The median age was 40 years. For every 100 females there were 101.5 males. For every 100 females age 18 and over, there were 97.3 males.

The median income for a household in the township was $31,563, and the median income for a family was $36,985. Males had a median income of $26,771 versus $18,875 for females. The per capita income for the township was $13,795. About 9.3% of families and 9.8% of the population lived below poverty line, including 11.2% of those under age 18 and 9.0% of those age 65 or over.
