= Foxburg, Pennsylvania =

Borough in Pennsylvania, US

- Borough
- Borough of Foxburg
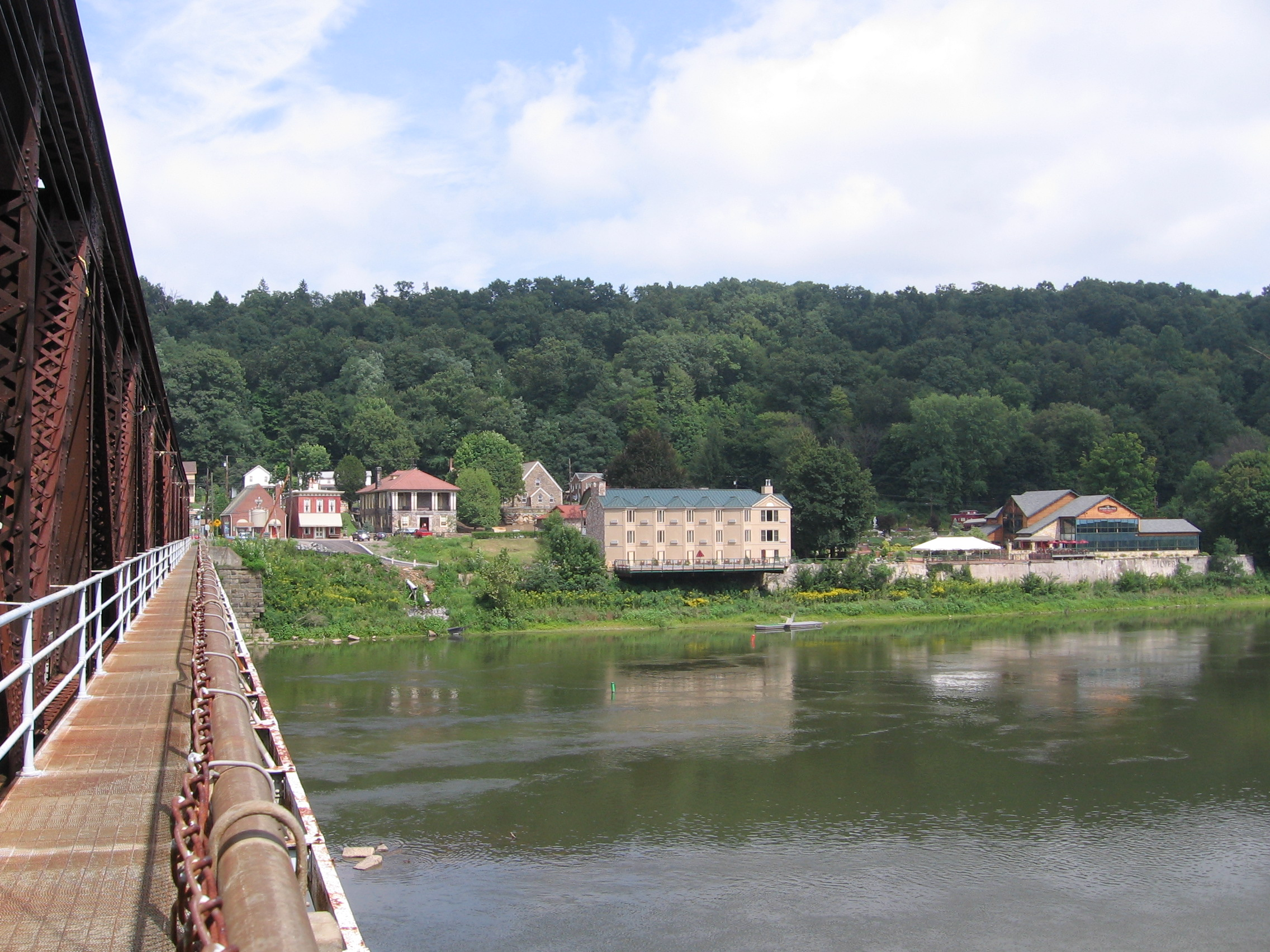
- Foxburg seen from the old Foxburg Bridge in August 2007

- Location of Foxburg in Clarion County, Pennsylvania.

- Location of Pennsylvania in the United States
- Coordinates: 41°8′35″N 79°40′48″W
- Country: United States
- State: Pennsylvania
- County: Clarion
- Settled: 1870
- Incorporated: 1930

Area
  - Total: 0.50 sq mi (1.30 km^{2})
  - Land: 0.37 sq mi (0.95 km^{2})
  - Water: 0.13 sq mi (0.34 km^{2})
- Elevation: 920 ft (280 m)

Population (2020)
  - Total: 181
  - Density: 492.3/sq mi (190.08/km^{2})
- Time zone: UTC−5 (EST)
  - Summer (DST): UTC−4 (EDT)
- ZIP Code: 16036
- FIPS code: 42-27112
- School district: Allegheny-Clarion Valley School District
- Website: www.foxburgboro.com

Foxburg is a borough in Clarion County, Pennsylvania, United States. It is located along the east bank of the Allegheny River, about 2 miles (3 km) north of the mouth of the Clarion River. As of the 2020 census it had a population of 181.

== History ==
The town takes its name from the Fox family of Philadelphia, former owners of the land upon which the town was built. Samuel Mickle Fox (1763–1808), along with his brother George and brothers-in-law Joseph Parker Norris and George Roberts, purchased a number of tracts of land in western Pennsylvania from the Commonwealth during the 1790s. Six of these tracts, numbered #5725–5730, comprising 6,600 acres (2,700 ha), were contiguous and located along the Allegheny north of its confluence with Toby's Creek (today's Clarion River). The present town of Foxburg is located on what was designated tract #5729.

Samuel's son Joseph purchased these tracts from his father's estate in 1816 and established a residence here ten years later. This was south of the town near the mouth of the Clarion. It became known to generations as "the Fox Mansion" or simply "the Mansion". Succeeding generations would make it a seasonal residence for the next 140 years.

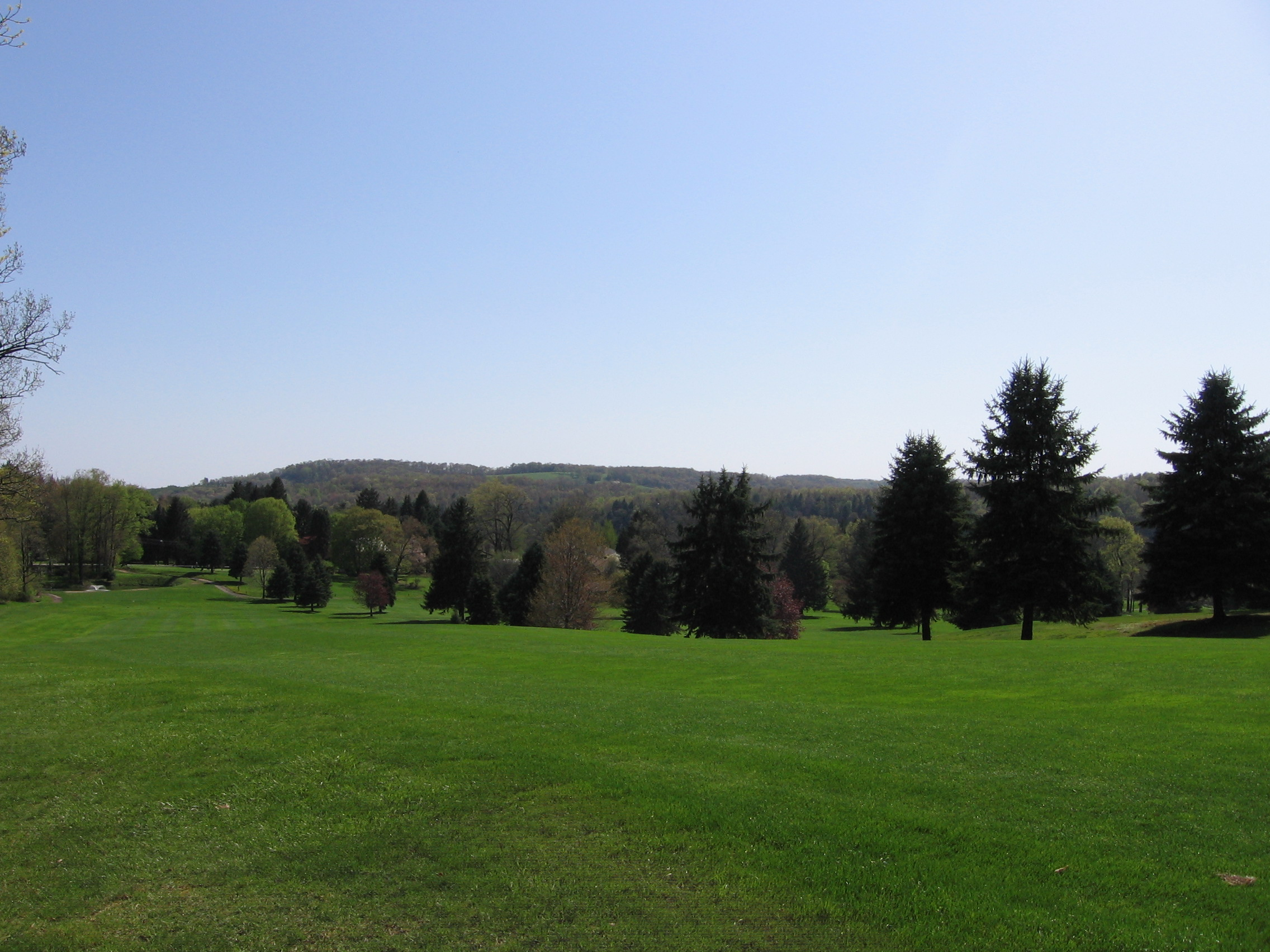
Foxburg Country Club

The town of Foxburg was founded amidst the oil developments in western Pennsylvania in 1870. At its height during the early 1870s it had a population of over 1,000. It remained a village until its incorporation as a borough on February 6, 1930. The borough was once served by two railroads. One was the Allegheny Division of the Pennsylvania Railroad, and the other was the Baltimore and Ohio Railroad. The B&O actually ran over the old Foxburg Bridge from 1921 to 1964. Today, both railroads are gone, as is the bridge, which was demolished on July 24, 2008.

The town is home to the nine-hole Foxburg Country Club, founded in 1887. It has been recognized as the oldest continuously operated course in the United States.

The town is also where the character John Nolan from the ABC series The Rookie is from. Before he moved to Los Angeles to become a police officer.

== Geography ==
Foxburg is located in western Clarion County at 41°8′35″N 79°40′48″W (41.142937, -79.679926), along the east bank of the Allegheny River, which forms the boundary with Armstrong County. Pennsylvania Route 58 passes through the borough, crossing the Allegheny on the new Foxburg Bridge, which opened in 2009. PA 58 leads northeast and uphill 2 miles (3 km) to St. Petersburg and west 6 miles (10 km) to Eau Claire. From the west end of the bridge, Pennsylvania Route 268 leads south 3 miles (5 km) to Parker and north 3 miles (5 km) to Emlenton.

According to the United States Census Bureau, Foxburg has a total area of 0.50 square miles (1.3 km^{2}), of which 0.39 square miles (1.0 km^{2}) is land and 0.12 square miles (0.3 km^{2}), or 26.45%, is water.

== Demographics ==
Historical population
Census	Pop.	Note	%±
1880	514		—
1930	472		—
1940	441		−6.6%
1950	422		−4.3%
1960	383		−9.2%
1970	353		−7.8%
1980	289		−18.1%
1990	262		−9.3%
2000	275		5.0%
2010	183		−33.5%
2020	181		−1.1%
2021 (est.)	180	▼	−0.6%

As of the census of 2000, there were 275 people, 101 households, and 81 families residing in the borough. The population density was 859.3 inhabitants per square mile (331.8/km^{2}). There were 116 housing units at an average density of 362.5 per square mile (140.0/km^{2}). The racial makeup of the borough was 100.00% White. Hispanic or Latino of any race were 1.82% of the population.

There were 101 households, out of which 33.7% had children under the age of 18 living with them, 67.3% were married couples living together, 9.9% had a female householder with no husband present, and 19.8% were non-families. 18.8% of all households were made up of individuals, and 10.9% had someone living alone who was 65 years of age or older. The average household size was 2.72 and the average family size was 3.07.

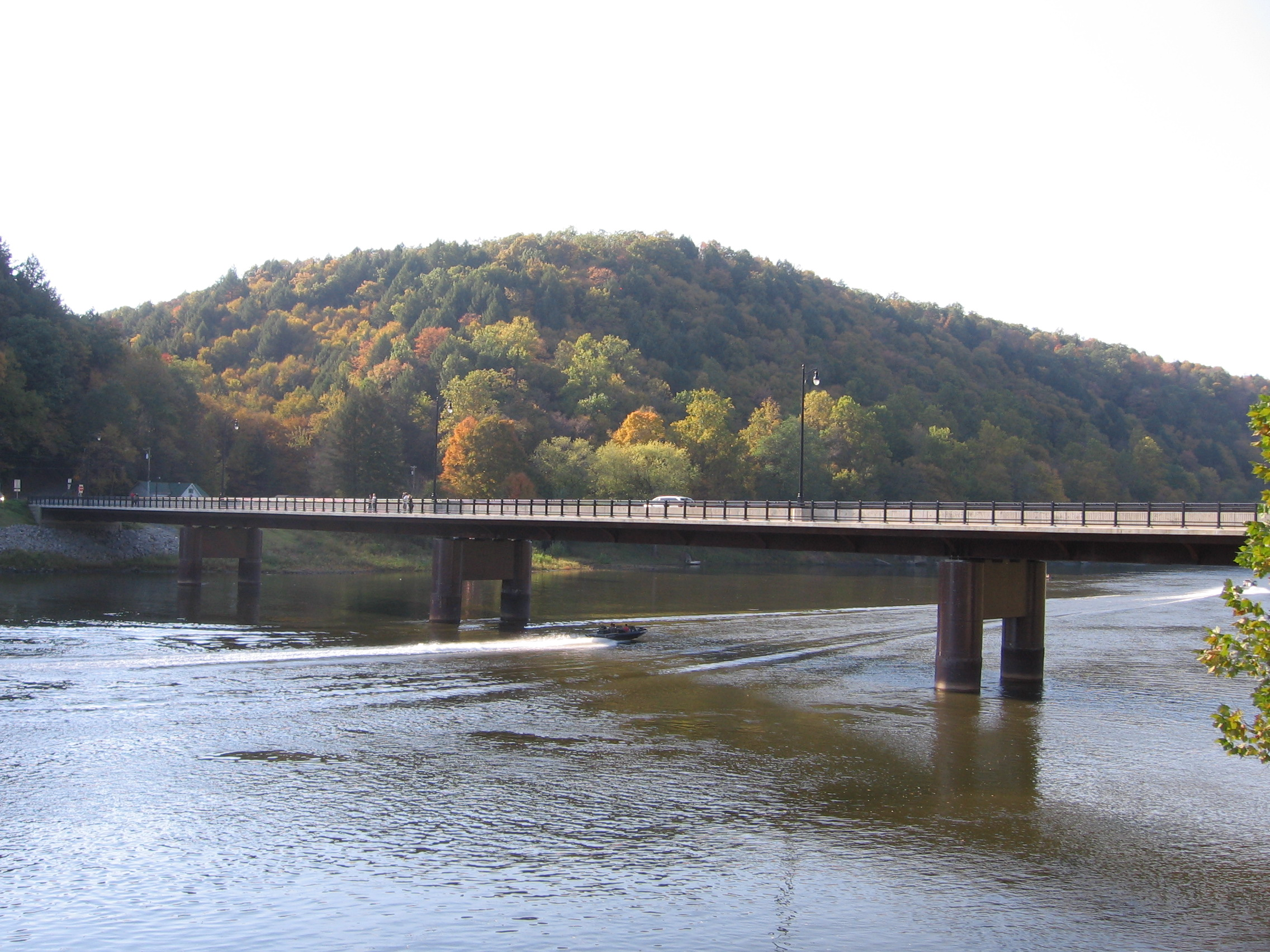
Foxburg Bridge, built 2008

In the borough the population was spread out, with 24.7% under the age of 18, 7.3% from 18 to 24, 28.4% from 25 to 44, 24.7% from 45 to 64, and 14.9% who were 65 years of age or older. The median age was 37 years. For every 100 females there were 102.2 males. For every 100 females age 18 and over, there were 109.1 males.

The median income for a household in the borough was $30,938, and the median income for a family was $31,719. Males had a median income of $31,000 versus $31,250 for females. The per capita income for the borough was $16,251. About 14.7% of families and 20.8% of the population were below the poverty line, including 39.0% of those under the age of eighteen and 7.0% of those sixty five or over.

== See also ==
- East Brady, Pennsylvania
- Emlenton, Pennsylvania
- Parker, Pennsylvania
