= List of crossings of the Allegheny River =

This is a list of current bridges and other crossings of the Allegheny River starting from Pittsburgh, Pennsylvania, where it joins the Monongahela to form the Ohio River.

== Crossings ==
=== Pennsylvania ===
| Crossing | Carries | Location | Image | Coordinates |
|---|---|---|---|---|
| Fort Duquesne Bridge | I-279 | Pittsburgh | | 40.4443°N 80.0093°W |
| Allegheny River Tunnel | Port Authority T Light Rail | Pittsburgh | | |
| Roberto Clemente Bridge | 6th Street | Pittsburgh | | 40.4456°N 80.0033°W |
| Andy Warhol Bridge | 7th Street | Pittsburgh | | 40°26′46″N 80°00′05″W |
| Rachel Carson Bridge | 9th Street | Pittsburgh | | 40.4467°N 79.9998°W |
| Fort Wayne Railroad Bridge | Allegheny Valley Railroad, Capitol Limited (Amtrak train), Norfolk Southern Railway Fort Wayne Line | Pittsburgh | | 40.4482°N 79.9962°W |
| Veterans Bridge | I-579 | Pittsburgh | | 40.4499°N 79.9934°W |
| David McCullough Bridge (16th Street Bridge) | 16th Street | Pittsburgh | | 40.4517°N 79.9909°W |
| Herr's Island Railroad Bridge (West Penn Bridge) (rails removed, crosses back channel only) | Three Rivers Heritage Bicycle Trail | Pittsburgh | | |
| 30th Street Bridge (crosses back channel only) | 30th Street | Pittsburgh | | |
| William R. Prom Memorial Bridge (31st Street Bridge) | 31st Street | Pittsburgh | | 40.4630°N 79.9758°W |
| 33rd Street Railroad Bridge | Allegheny Valley Railroad P&W Subdivision | Pittsburgh | | 40.4657°N 79.9736°W |
| Washington Crossing Bridge (40th Street Bridge) | 40th Street | Pittsburgh and Millvale | | 40.4728°N 79.9686°W |
| Senator Robert D. Fleming Bridge (62nd Street Bridge) | PA 8 | Pittsburgh and Sharpsburg | | 40.4912°N 79.9381°W |
| Allegheny River Lock and Dam Two | Allegheny River | Pittsburgh and O'Hara Township | | 40.4867°N 79.9147°W |
| Highland Park Bridge | Blue Belt/Green Belt | Pittsburgh and O'Hara Township | | 40.4891°N 79.9120°W |
| Brilliant Branch Railroad Bridge | Allegheny Valley Railroad Brilliant Branch | Pittsburgh and Aspinwall | | 40.4866°N 79.9053°W |
| Jonathon Hulton Bridge | Hulton Road | Oakmont and Harmar Township | | 40.5283°N 79.8467°W |
| Allegheny River Turnpike Bridge | I-76 (Pennsylvania Turnpike) | Plum and Harmar Township | | 40.5373°N 79.8222°W |
| Bessemer & Lake Erie Railroad Bridge | Bessemer and Lake Erie Railroad | Plum and Harmar Township | | 40.5376°N 79.8209°W |
| C. W. Bill Young Lock and Dam (Allegheny River Lock and Dam Three) | Allegheny River | Plum and Harmar Township | | 40.5382°N 79.8154°W |
| Logans Ferry Mine Tunnel (abandoned) | Logans Ferry Coal Mine to Springdale Reliant Energy Power Plant | Plum and Springdale | | 40.5450°N 79.7640°W |
| C.L. Schmitt Bridge (9th Street Bridge) | 9th Street | New Kensington and Springdale Township | | |
| George D. Stuart Bridge (Tarentum Bridge) | PA 366 | New Kensington and Tarentum | | |
| Allegheny River Lock and Dam Four | Allegheny River | Lower Burrell and Harrison Township | | 40.6150°N 79.7181°W |
| Donald R. Lobaugh Bridge (Freeport Bridge) | PA 356 | Allegheny Township and Buffalo Township | | |
| Freeport Rail Bridge | Norfolk Southern Railway Pittsburgh Line | Allegheny Township and Freeport | | |
| Allegheny River Lock and Dam Five | Allegheny River | Gilpin Township and South Buffalo Township | | 40.6833°N 79.6664°W |
| Allegheny River Lock and Dam Six | Allegheny River | Bethel Township and South Buffalo Township | | 40.7167°N 79.5797°W |
| Ford City Veterans Bridge | PA 128 | Ford City and North Buffalo Township | | |
| Judge J. Frank Graff Bridge (Kittanning–Ford City Bridge) | US 422 / PA 28 | Manor Township and North Buffalo Township | | |
| Kittanning Citizens Bridge | US 422 Bus. | Kittanning and West Kittanning | | |
| Allegheny River Lock and Dam Seven | Allegheny River | Kittanning and West Kittanning | | 40.8183°N 79.5281°W |
| Bridgeburg Rail Bridge | Buffalo and Pittsburgh Railroad mainline, formerly the Buffalo, Rochester and Pittsburgh Railway | Rayburn Township and East Franklin Township | | |
| Allegheny River Lock and Dam Eight | Allegheny River | Pine Township and Washington Township | | 40.8950°N 79.4780°W |
| Reesedale Railroad Bridge | Buffalo and Pittsburgh Railroad, Pittsburg and Shawmut Railroad branch | Pine Township and Washington Township | | |
| Allegheny River Lock and Dam Nine | Allegheny River | Madison Township and Washington Township | | 40.9550°N 79.5481°W |
| Sergeant Carl F. Curran II Bridge (East Brady Bridge) | PA 68 | East Brady and Brady's Bend Township | | |
| Parker Bridge | PA 368 | Perry Township and Parker | | |
| Foxburg Bridge | PA 58 | Foxburg and Hovey Township | | |
| Emlenton Bridge | I-80 | Richland Township and Allegheny Township | | |
| Emlenton Low Level Bridge | PA 38 | Emlenton | | 41.1757°N 79.7081°W |
| Kennerdell Bridge | Kenderell Road | Rockland Township and Clinton Township | | |
| Belmar Railroad Bridge (rails removed) | Allegheny River Bike Trail | Cranberry Township and Sandycreek Township | | |
| Eighth Street Bridge | US 322 | Cranberry Township and Franklin | | |
| Petroleum Street Bridge | US 62 | Oil City | | |
| Veterans Memorial Bridge | State Street | Oil City | | |
| Oil City Pennsylvania Railroad Bridge | Western New York and Pennsylvania Railroad | Oil City and Cranberry Township | | |
| Hunter Station Bridge | US 62 | Tionesta Township | | |
| Tionesta Bridge | US 62 / PA 36 | Tionesta and Tionesta Township | | |
| West Hickory Bridge | PA 127 | Hickory Township and Harmony Township | | |
| Tidioute Bridge | PA 127 | Limestone Township and Tidioute | | |
| Irvine Bridge | US 62 | Pleasant Township and Conewango Township | | |
| National Forge Bridge | US 6 | Pleasant Township and Warren | | |
| West Warren Railroad Bridge | Buffalo and Pittsburgh Railroad Northern Subdivision | Pleasant Township and Warren | | |
| Hickory Street Bridge | Hickory Street | Pleasant Township and Warren | | |
| East Warren Railroad Bridge | Buffalo and Pittsburgh Railroad Warren Branch | Mead Township and Warren | | |
| Glade Bridge | US 6 Bus. | Mead Township and Warren | | |
| Kinzua Dam | Allegheny River | Mead Township and Glade Township | | |

=== New York ===
| Crossing | Carries | Location | Coordinates |
|---|---|---|---|
| Quaker Bridge (demolished) | NY 280 | Coldspring | Electric lines still cross river at the site. |
| Kinzua High Level Bridge | I-86 | Red House and Coldspring | |
| Allegheny Reservation Bridge (closed to all traffic) | NY 17 (old) | Red House and Allegheny Indian Reservation | |
| Cornplanter Bridge | NY 353 | Salamanca | |
| Main Street Bridge | | Salamanca | |
| Clinton Street Bridge | US 219 / NY 417 | Salamanca | |
| Riverside Junction Railroad Bridge | Buffalo and Pittsburgh Railroad Salamanca line | Great Valley and Carrollton | |
| Old Riverside Junction Railroad Bridge (abandoned) | former Buffalo and Pittsburgh Railroad Salamanca line | Great Valley and Carrollton | |
| Cattaraugus County Veterans Memorial Bridge | I-86 | Great Valley and Carrollton | |
| Bemus Bridge | US 219 | Great Valley and Carrollton | |
| Nine Mile Road Bridge (abandoned) | | Allegeny and Carrollton | |
| Allegany Bridge | I-86 | Allegeny and Olean | |
| First Street Bridge | | Allegeny and Olean | |
| South Union Street- Veterans Memorial Bridge | NY 16 | Olean | |
| Steam Valley Bridge | | Portville | |
| Gleason Hollow Bridge | | Portville | |

=== Pennsylvania ===
| Crossing | Carries | Location | Coordinates |
|---|---|---|---|
| Kendall Bridge | PA 346 | Eldred and Eldred Township | |
| Larabee Bridge | PA 446 | Eldred Township | |
| WNY&P Bridge | Western New York and Pennsylvania Railroad | Eldred Township | |
| Champlain Hill Bridge | | Annin Township | |
| Richard Lilli Bridge | US 6 | Port Allegany and Liberty Township | |
| West Mill Street Bridge | PA 155 | Port Allegany and Liberty Township | |
| Emporium Bridge | PA 155 | Port Allegany and Liberty Township | |
| South Turtle Road Bridge | | Liberty Township | |
| Kim Hill Road Bridge | | Roulette Township | |
| Pomeroy Street Bridge | | Roulette Township | |
| Maple Street Bridge | | Roulette Township | |
| Celaschi Covered Bridge | | Eulalia Township | |
| Olastead Road Bridge | | Eulalia Township | |
| Toles Hollow Bridge | | Coudersport and Eulalia Township | |
| Chestnut Street Bridge | | Coudersport | |
| Coudersport Main Street Bridge | US 6 | Coudersport | |
| Allegheny Avenue Bridge | | Coudersport | |
| Second Street Bridge | US 6 | Coudersport | |
| Fourth Street Bridge (abandoned) | | Coudersport | |
| Seventh Street Bridge | | Coudersport | |
| Avenue A Bridge | | Coudersport and Eulalia Township | |
| Prosser Hollow Bridge | | Eulalia Township and Sweden Township | |
| Colesburg Bridge | | Sweden Township | |
| PA 49 Bridge | PA 49 | Sweden Township and Ulysses Township | |

== See also ==
- List of crossings of the Ohio River
- List of crossings of the Monongahela River
