= Pennsylvania Route 227 =

State highway in Pennsylvania, United States

Pennsylvania Route 227

Route information
- Maintained by PennDOT
- Length: 21.3 mi (34.3 km)

Major junctions
- West end: PA 8 in Rouseville
- PA 27 / PA 36 in Pleasantville
- East end: PA 127 in Harmony Township

Location
- Country: United States
- State: Pennsylvania
- Counties: Venango, Forest

Highway system
- Pennsylvania State Route System; Interstate; US; State; Scenic; Legislative
← PA 226	→ PA 228

Pennsylvania Route 227 (PA 227) is a 21.3-mile-long (34.3 km) state highway located in Venango and Forest counties in Pennsylvania. The western terminus is at PA 8 in Rouseville. The eastern terminus is at PA 127 in Harmony Township.

== Route description ==
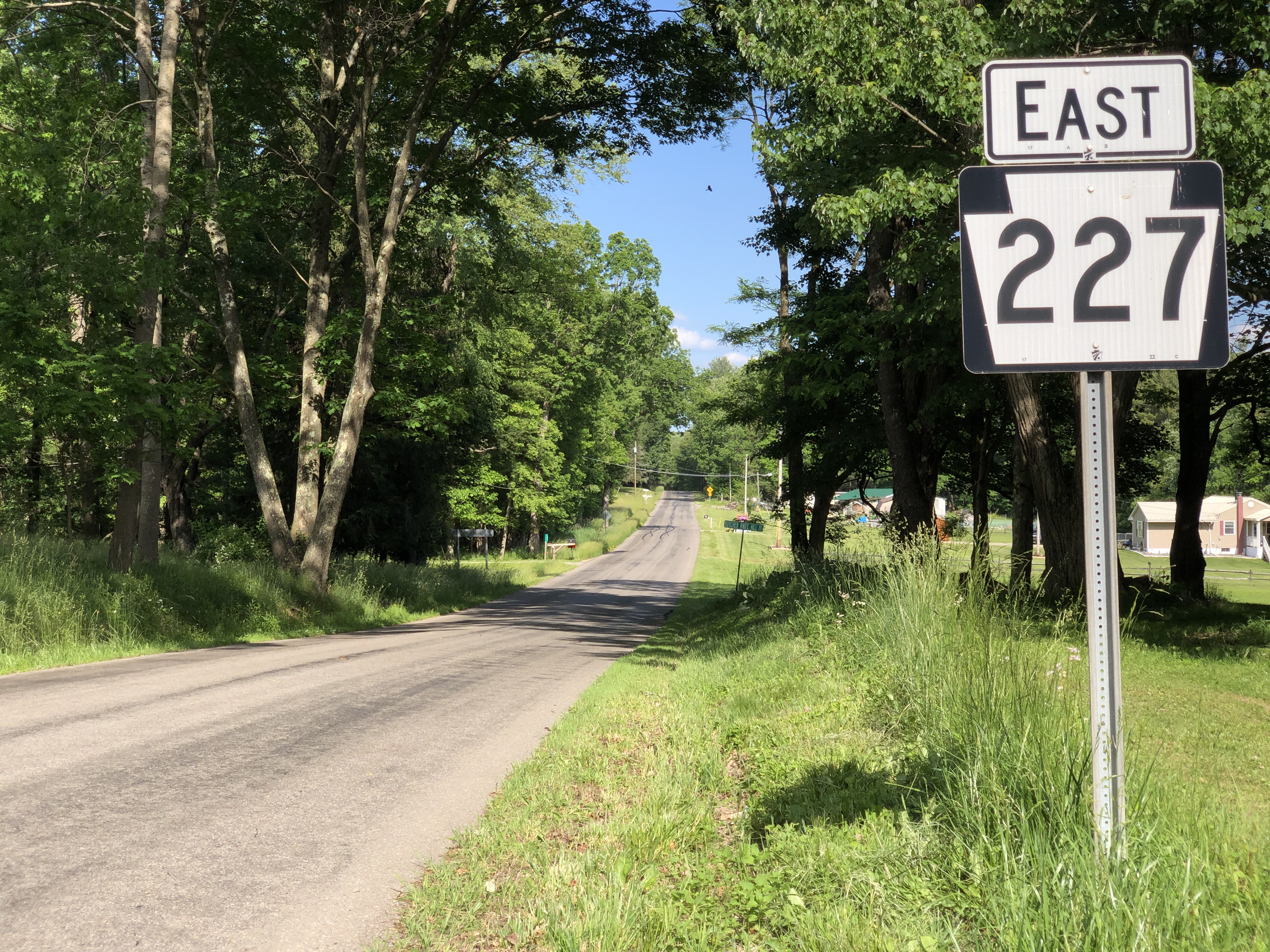
PA 227 eastbound in Harmony Township

PA 227 begins at an intersection with PA 8 in the borough of Rouseville in Venango County, heading northeast on two-lane undivided Cherry Run Road. The road heads through wooded areas of homes, heading into more forested areas and crossing into Cornplanter Township. The route curves east before turning northeast again, heading through more wooded areas with some fields and homes as Rouseville Road and passing through Plumer. PA 227 runs through more forests and turns to the north, heading into Oil Creek Township. The road continues through woodland with a few small farms and residences, heading through East Shamburg. In the community of Jerusalem Corners, the route turns northeast onto Shreve Run Road and runs through more rural areas. PA 227 comes to an intersection with PA 27, at which point it turns southeast to form a concurrency with that route on West State Street, entering the borough of Pleasantville. The road passes homes, coming to an intersection with Main Street. At this point, PA 27 and PA 227 turn north onto North Main Street and PA 36 continues southeast on East State Street. The two routes pass more residences, with PA 227 splitting from PA 27 by turning east onto 3rd Street. The route continues through residential areas, turning northeast onto Neiltown Road and heading into wooded areas with some homes. The road curves to the north and becomes the border between Pleasantville to the west and Allegheny Township to the east, passing fields. PA 227 turns northeast to fully enter Allegheny Township, running through more farmland and woodland with some homes. The road turns to the east and heads through more wooded areas with some agricultural clearings.

PA 227 enters Harmony Township in Forest County and becomes Butcher Knife Hill Road, passing through fields before heading into dense forests, turning northeast and back to the east. The route winds northeast through more forests, reaching its eastern terminus at PA 127.

== Major intersections ==
County	Location	mi	km	Destinations	Notes
Venango	Rouseville	0.0	0.0	PA 8 (Main Street) – Oil City, Titusville	Western terminus of PA 227
Venango	Pleasantville	11.7	18.8	PA 27 west (Titusville Road) – Titusville	Western terminus of PA 27 concurrency
Venango	Pleasantville	12.4	20.0	PA 36 south (East State Street) – Tionesta	Northern terminus of PA 36
Venango	Pleasantville	12.6	20.3	PA 27 east (North Main Street) – Youngsville	Eastern terminus of PA 27 concurrency
Forest	Harmony Township	21.3	34.3	PA 127 (Fleming Hill Road) – West Hickory, Tidioute	Eastern terminus of PA 227
1.000 mi = 1.609 km; 1.000 km = 0.621 mi: Concurrency terminus
