= Pennsylvania Route 127 =

State highway in Pennsylvania, US

Pennsylvania Route 127

Route information
- Maintained by PennDOT
- Length: 10.01 mi (16.11 km)
- Existed: 1928–present

Major junctions
- South end: US 62 in West Hickory
- PA 227 in Trunkeyville
- North end: US 62 near Tidioute

Location
- Country: United States
- State: Pennsylvania
- Counties: Forest, Warren

Highway system
- Pennsylvania State Route System; Interstate; US; State; Scenic; Legislative
| ← PA 126 | → PA 128 |

Pennsylvania Route 127 (PA 127) is a 10-mile-long (16 km) state highway located in Forest and Warren counties in Pennsylvania. The southern terminus is at U.S. Route 62 (US 62) in West Hickory. The northern terminus is at US 62 outside of Tidioute.

== Route description ==
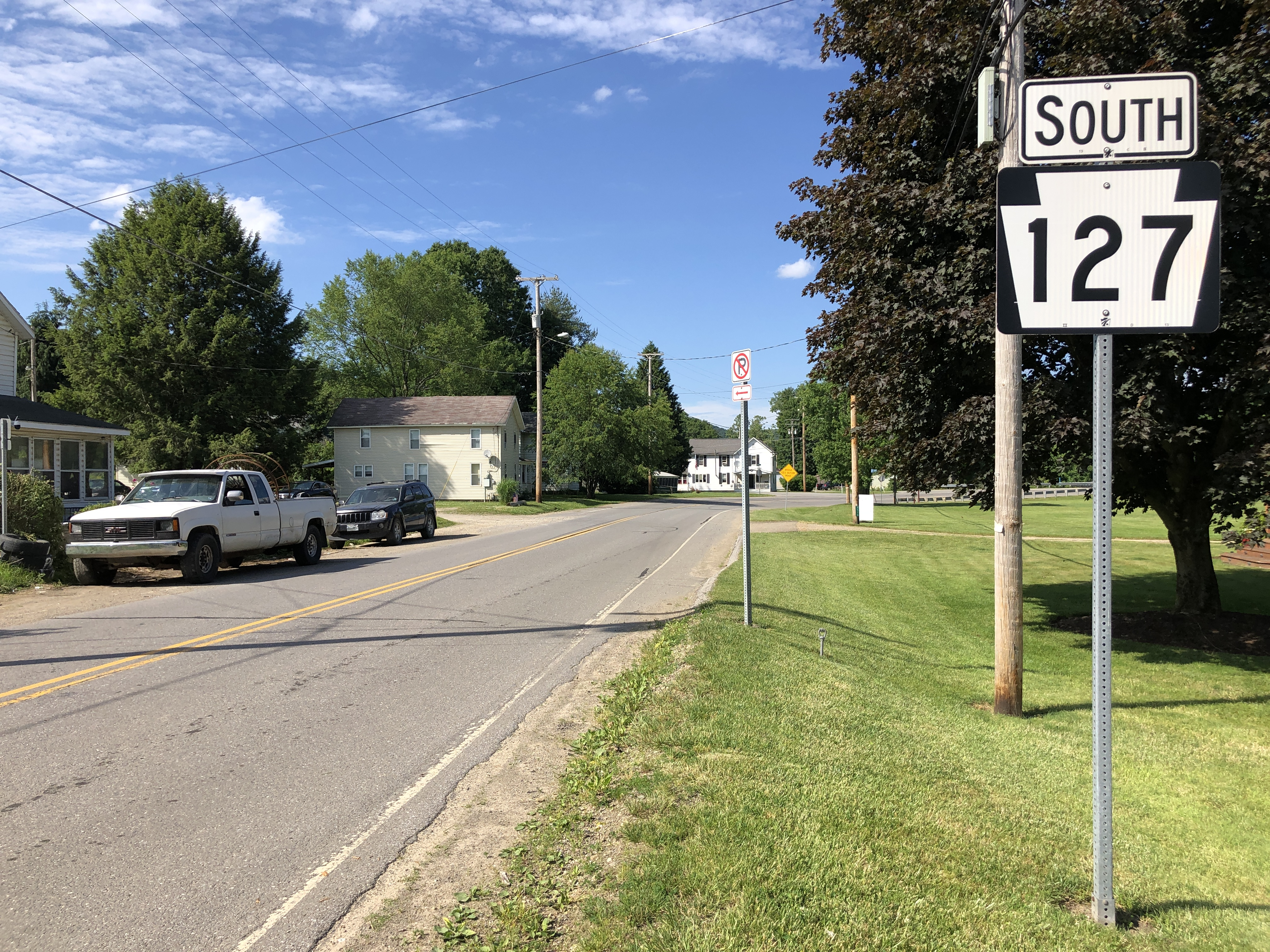
PA 127 southbound in West Hickory

PA 127 begins at an intersection with US 62 in Hickory Township, Forest County, heading west on two-lane undivided Main Street. The route immediately crosses the Allegheny River into the residential community of West Hickory in Harmony Township. PA 127 turns south before turning northwest onto Fleming Hill Road and leaving West Hickory. The road curves north and enters dense hilly forests. PA 127 continues through more forests with a few areas of homes and fields, reaching a junction with the eastern terminus of PA 227 in Fagundus Corners. A short distance later, the road heads into Triumph Township in Warren County, becoming an unnamed road that passes through Fagundus and running through more dense forests. Along this stretch, PA 127 forms the west border of the Allegheny National Forest. The route turns northeast and becomes Babylon Hill Road before turning into Main Street as it enters the borough of Tidioute. Here, PA 127 passes homes before turning south onto Buckingham Street and running past businesses. The route crosses the Allegheny River again into Limestone Township and immediately ends at US 62.

== Major intersections ==
| County | Location | mi | km | Destinations | Notes |
|---|---|---|---|---|---|
| Forest | Hickory Township | 0.00 | 0.00 | US 62 – Tionesta | Southern terminus |
| Forest | Harmony Township | 4.58 | 7.37 | PA 227 west (Butcher Knife Hill Road) – Pleasantville | Eastern terminus of PA 227 |
| Warren | Limestone Township | 10.01 | 16.11 | US 62 – Warren | Northern terminus |
1.000 mi = 1.609 km; 1.000 km = 0.621 mi
