= U.S. Route 62 in Pennsylvania =

Segment of American highway

U.S. Route 62
- US 62 highlighted in red and US 62 Business in blue

Route information
- Maintained by PennDOT
- Length: 119 mi (192 km)
- Existed: 1932–present

Major junctions
- South end: US 62 at the Ohio state line in Sharon
- PA 18 in Hermitage; US 19 / PA 58 in Mercer; I-79 near Mercer; PA 173 / PA 358 in Sandy Lake; US 322 / PA 8 in Franklin; PA 36 in Tionesta; US 6 in Warren
- North end: US 62 at the New York state line near Kiantone, NY

Location
- Country: United States
- State: Pennsylvania
- Counties: Mercer, Venango, Forest, Warren

Highway system
- United States Numbered Highway System; List; Special; Divided; Pennsylvania State Route System; Interstate; US; State; Scenic; Legislative
← PA 61	→ PA 62

U.S. Route 62 (US 62) is a signed north-south U.S. Highway that is located in the Commonwealth of Pennsylvania in the United States. It stretches diagonally southwest-northeast through the industrial northwestern part of the commonwealth.

Although initial portions of the route opened in 1926 in other areas of the country, US 62 was not designated in the commonwealth until 1932. The highway connects the small cities of Sharon, Franklin, Oil City, and Warren to larger markets, such as Youngstown, Ohio and Buffalo, New York.

== Route description ==
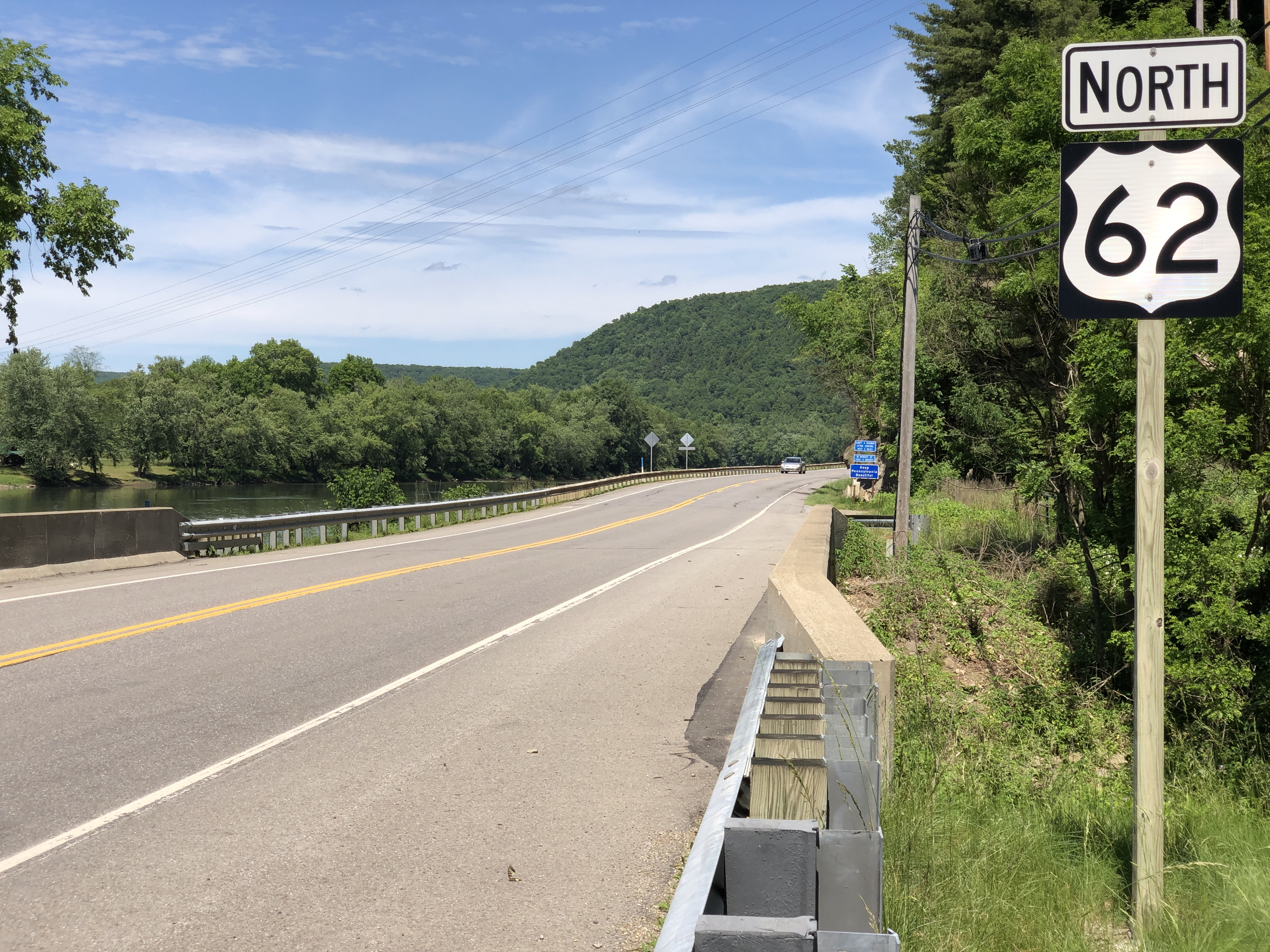
US 62 northbound in Hickory Township

U.S. Route 62 enters Pennsylvania from Ohio as part of the Shenango Valley Freeway. Four lanes, winding, and with limited stop lights, the road, which was built in 1958, bypasses the city of Sharon. A business route is signed on the former path of the highway. After passing through Sharon, the road reverts to two lane status, as it travels toward Mercer, the county seat of Mercer County.

Here, it briefly joins US 19 through the center of town. The road then turns sharply toward a north-northeast alignment and features an interchange with Interstate 79. After cutting through rural Mercer and Venango counties, US 62 reaches the twin industrial towns of Franklin and Oil City. In Franklin, the highway is briefly cosigned with US 322, as it passes through the west side of town. The road then joins PA 8 to form a four–lane riverfront connector between the two towns.

Immediately before entering Oil City, the roads split, with US 62 branching off to cross the Allegheny River over the Petroleum Street Bridge and serve the south side of town. After crossing this 1995 girder structure, which replaced a 1910 truss bridge, the highway remains four lanes until leaving the municipality.

The Allegheny River is only rarely out of sight as the highway winds its way through Venango and Forest Counties, crossing from the south bank to the north by way of the Hunter Station Bridge, an unusual 1934 truss design. It crosses the river a third time on the Tionesta Bridge, a 1961 girder structure that set the tone for 1980s–90s replacements of a series of historic bridges along the waterway.

While traveling through Forest and into Warren County, the road is oriented in a north-south direction, which is reflected in its guide signs, despite the national route’s east-west direction. The route passes through the Allegheny Islands Wilderness, crosses the river again via the Irvine Bridge, and subsequently joins with US 6 via a trumpet interchange to form part of the freeway bypass of Warren, which was constructed in 1969. The routes divide near the city center, and US 62 follows a narrow path of city streets in the old city core before becoming a four–lane highway north of the town. The highway becomes a two–lane road again as it heads toward the New York boundary.

== History ==
US 62 was designated in Pennsylvania in 1932, replacing PA 65 between the Ohio border near Sharon and Franklin, PA 8 between Franklin and Oil City, PA 57 between Oil City and Fryburg, and PA 66 between Fryburg and the New York border. Signs were installed by June 1 of that year.

== Major intersections ==
County	Location	mi	km	Destinations	Notes
Mercer	Sharon	0.0	0.0	US 62 west – Youngstown	Continuation into Ohio
Mercer	Sharon	0.1	0.16	US 62 Bus. north (Irvine Avenue)	Southern terminus of US 62 Bus.
Mercer	Sharon	0.8	1.3	PA 718 / PA 760 (South Dock Street) – Farrell, Wheatland	Interchange
Mercer	Sharon	1.8	2.9	PA 518 (Stambaugh Avenue)	
Mercer	Hermitage	3.7	6.0	PA 418 (Maple Drive)	
Mercer	Hermitage	4.2	6.8	PA 18 (South Hermitage Road) to I-80 east / I-376	
Mercer	Hermitage	4.6	7.4	US 62 Bus. south (State Street) to PA 18 north	Roundabout; northern terminus of US 62 Bus.
Mercer	Mercer	15.6	25.1	PA 258 north (North Maple Street) – Clark	Southern end of PA 258 concurrency
Mercer	Mercer	15.7	25.3	PA 158 south (South Shenango Street) to PA 318	Northern terminus of PA 158
Mercer	Mercer	15.8	25.4	US 19 south (South Erie Street) / PA 58 east / PA 258 south (Diamond Street) to I-80 – Zelienople	Northern end of PA 258 concurrency; southern end of US 19 / PA 58 concurrency
Mercer	Mercer	16.0	25.7	PA 58 west (Greenville Road) – Greenville	Northern end of PA 58 concurrency
Mercer	Coolspring Township	16.4	26.4	US 19 north (Perry Highway) – Meadville	Northern end of US 19 concurrency
Mercer	Jackson Township	20.7	33.3	I-79 – Erie, Pittsburgh	I-79 exit 121
Mercer	Jackson Township	23.0	37.0	PA 965 east (Henderson Road) – Polk, Franklin	Western terminus of PA 965
Mercer	Sandy Lake Township	28.1	45.2	PA 845 north (Walnut Street) – Stoneboro	Southern terminus of PA 845
Mercer	Sandy Lake	29.0	46.7	PA 173 south (South Main Street)	Southern end of PA 173 concurrency
Mercer	Sandy Lake	29.1	46.8	PA 173 north (North Main Street) / PA 358 west (Lake Street) to I-79	Northern end of PA 173 concurrency; eastern terminus of PA 358
Venango	Victory Township	37.0	59.5	PA 965 west (Jackson Center-Polk Road) – Jackson Center	Eastern terminus of PA 965
Venango	French Creek Township	42.7	68.7	PA 8 south (Pittsburgh Road) to I-80 – Butler	Southern end of PA 8 concurrency
Venango	Franklin	44.2	71.1	US 322 west (13th Street)	Southern end of US 322 concurrency
Venango	Franklin	44.7	71.9	US 322 east (Liberty Street)	Northern end of US 322 concurrency
Venango	Oil City	52.2	84.0	PA 8 north (Main Street) / PA 428 north (Halyday Street) – Titusville	Northern end of PA 8 concurrency; southern terminus of PA 428
Venango	Oil City	53.5	86.1	PA 257 south – Cranberry	Northern terminus of PA 257
Venango	Cranberry Township	56.6	91.1	PA 157 east – Fryburg	Eastern terminus of PA 157
Forest	Tionesta Township	70.4	113.3	PA 36 north (Colonel Drake Highway) – Pleasantville	Southern end of PA 36 concurrency
Forest	Tionesta	70.8	113.9	PA 36 south (Elm Street) – Brookville	Northern end of PA 36 concurrency
Forest	Hickory Township	76.9	123.8	PA 127 north (Main Street) – West Hickory	Southern terminus of PA 127
Forest	Hickory Township	77.9	125.4	PA 666 east – Endeavor	Western terminus of PA 666
Warren	Limestone Township	84.9	136.6	PA 127 south (Buckingham Street) – Tidioute	Northern terminus of PA 127
Warren	Brokenstraw Township	100.6	161.9	US 6 west (Grand Army of the Republic Highway) – Youngsville	Southern end of US 6 concurrency; interchange
Warren	Warren	105.6	169.9	US 6 east (Grand Army of the Republic Highway) US 6 Bus. begins	Northern end of US 6 concurrency; southern end of US 6 Bus. concurrency; interchange
Warren	Warren	107.1	172.4	US 6 Bus. east (Pennsylvania Avenue West)	Northern end of US 6 Bus. concurrency
Warren	Conewango Township	109.8	176.7	PA 69 north (Jackson Run Road) – Sugar Grove	Southern terminus of PA 69
Warren	Pine Grove Township	114.5	184.3	PA 957 west – Sugar Grove	Eastern terminus of PA 957
Warren	Pine Grove Township	118.8	191.2	US 62 north – Jamestown	Continuation into New York
1.000 mi = 1.609 km; 1.000 km = 0.621 mi: Concurrency terminus

== See also ==
U.S. Route 62
Previous state: Ohio	Pennsylvania	Next state: New York
