= Tionesta Bridge =

- Coordinates: 41°29′43″N 79°27′37″W
- Carries: Two lanes of US 62 / PA 36
- Crosses: Allegheny River
- Locale: Tionesta Township and Tionesta

Characteristics
- Design: Girder bridge
- Total length: 761 feet (232 m)
- Width: 33 feet (10 m)

History
- Opened: 1961

The Tionesta Bridge is a girder bridge that carries U.S. Route 62 and Pennsylvania Route 36 across the Allegheny River in rural Forest County, Pennsylvania. The borough of Tionesta on the east bank of the river is connected with an unpopulated section of Tionesta Township on the west bank.

This 1961 structure was the first girder bridge completed along the river between the edge of suburban Pittsburgh and Kinzua Dam. Over the last 30 years, many nearby structures were completed with a similar design; this bridge was rehabilitated in 1988.

== See also ==
- List of crossings of the Allegheny River
