= Freeport Bridge =

'Freeport bridge may refer to:

- Freeport Bridge is an alternate name for the Donald R. Lobaugh Bridge in Pennsylvania
- Freeport Bridge (Grand River, Ontario) is a heritage multispan concrete truss span bridge -- a companion to the Cambridge Main Street Bridge
- Freeport Bridge (Quebec) see List of covered bridges in Quebec
- Freeport Rail Bridge, a railroad bridge in Pennsylvania
