= Triumph Township, Pennsylvania =

Township in Pennsylvania, United States

Coordinates: 41°40′00″N 79°27′59″W

Triumph Township
- Township
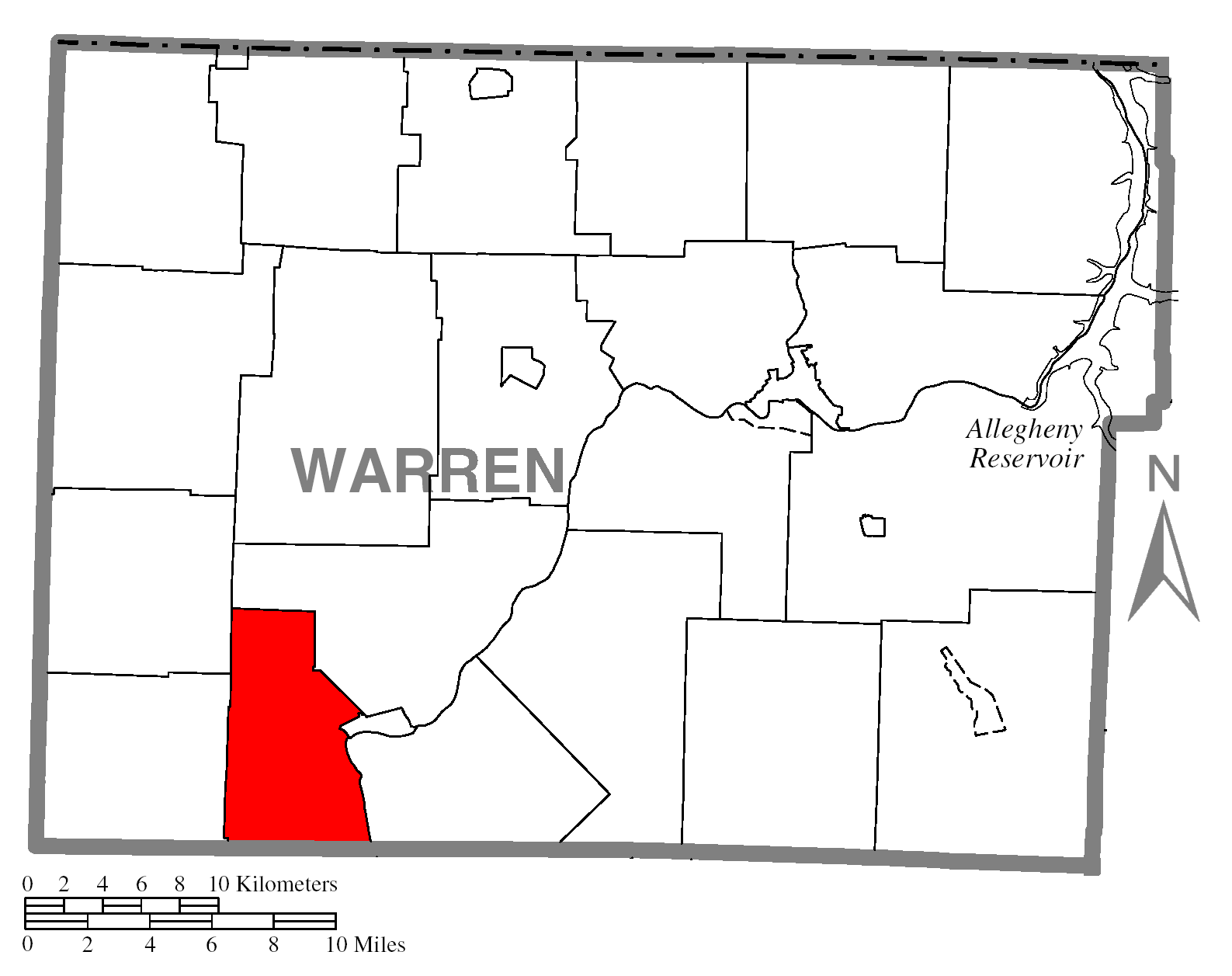
- Location of Triumph Township in Warren County

- Location of Warren County in Pennsylvania
- Country: United States
- State: Pennsylvania
- County: Warren County

Area
  - Total: 28.46 sq mi (73.72 km^{2})
  - Land: 28.23 sq mi (73.12 km^{2})
  - Water: 0.23 sq mi (0.60 km^{2})

Population (2020)
  - Total: 275
  - Estimate (2023): 267
  - Density: 10.7/sq mi (4.13/km^{2})
- Time zone: UTC-4 (EST)
  - Summer (DST): UTC-5 (EDT)
- Area code: 814
- FIPS code: 42-123-77512

Triumph Township is a township in Warren County, Pennsylvania, United States. The population was 275 at the 2020 census, down from 316 at the 2010 census.

== Geography ==
According to the United States Census Bureau, the township has a total area of 28.7 square miles (74 km^{2}), of which 28.5 square miles (74 km^{2}) is land and 0.2 square miles (0.52 km^{2}) (0.70%) is water.

== Demographics ==
Historical population
Census	Pop.	Note	%±
2000	286		—
2010	316		10.5%
2020	275		−13.0%
2023 (est.)	267		−2.9%
U.S. Decennial Census

As of the census of 2000, there were 286 people, 129 households, and 90 families residing in the township. The population density was 10.0 people per square mile (3.9 people/km^{2}). There were 415 housing units at an average density of 14.5 per square mile (5.6/km^{2}). The racial makeup of the township was 99.65% White, and 0.35% from two or more races.

There were 129 households, out of which 18.6% had children under the age of 18 living with them, 59.7% were married couples living together, 7.0% had a female householder with no husband present, and 29.5% were non-families. 24.8% of all households were made up of individuals, and 9.3% had someone living alone who was 65 years of age or older. The average household size was 2.22 and the average family size was 2.64.

In the township the population was spread out, with 14.3% under the age of 18, 7.7% from 18 to 24, 22.0% from 25 to 44, 36.7% from 45 to 64, and 19.2% who were 65 years of age or older. The median age was 47 years. For every 100 females, there were 110.3 males. For every 100 females age 18 and over, there were 116.8 males.

The median income for a household in the township was $30,536, and the median income for a family was $30,417. Males had a median income of $32,917 versus $18,125 for females. The per capita income for the township was $15,621. About 20.2% of families and 17.6% of the population were below the poverty line, including 30.0% of those under the age of 18 and 8.8% of those 65 or over.

== Communities and locations ==
- Allegheny National Forest - A small part of this national forest is located in southeastern Triumph Township.
- Allegheny River - A major river forming part of the township's eastern border.
- Excelsior (also "Excelsior Corners) - A village at the corner of Campbell Hill Road and Youngsville Road in the northwestern part of the township.
- Fagundus - A village on Pennsylvania Route 127 near the southern township line.
- Hemlock - A village at the corner of Tidioute Creek Road and Youngsville Road in the northern part of the township.
- McGraw Corners - A location at the corner of Pineville Road and Youngsville Road in the western part of the township.
- New London - A village kitty-corner from McGraw Corners.
- Tidioute - A borough bordering Triumph Township to the east.
- Whitehead Corners - A location at the corner of Seldom Seen Road and Youngsville Road in the western part of the township.
