= Pennsylvania Route 62 =

Pennsylvania Route 62 may refer to:

- U.S. Route 62 in Pennsylvania
- Pennsylvania Route 62 (1920s)
