= Tidioute Bridge =

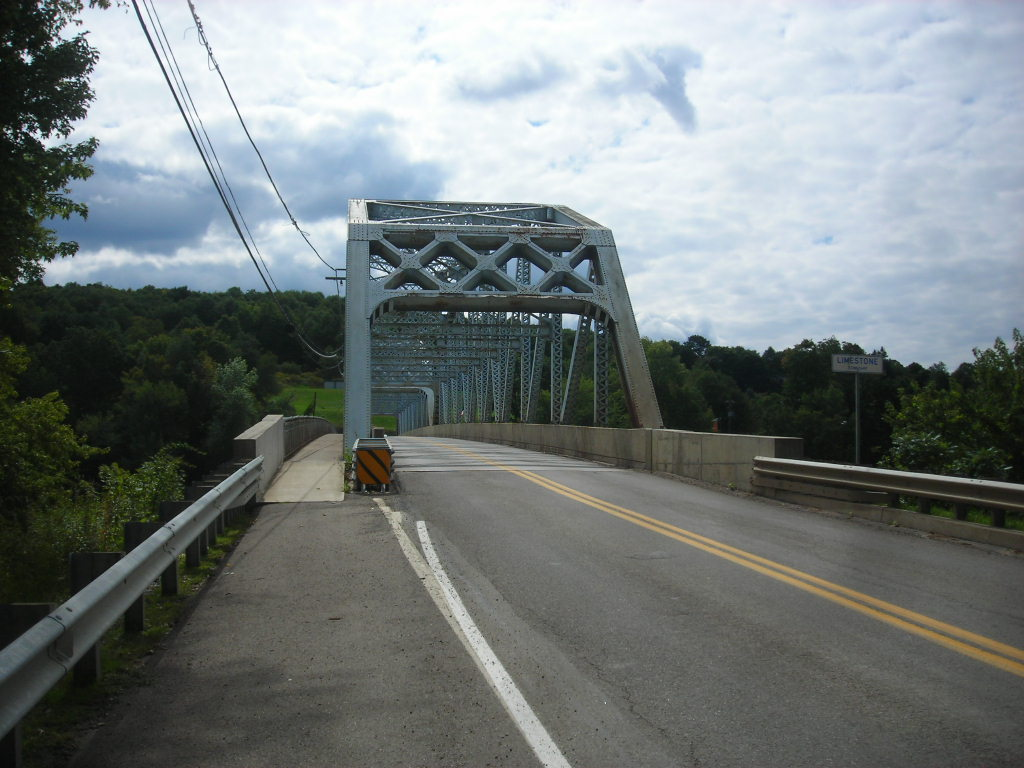
- Coordinates: 41°40′50.5″N 79°24′45″W
- Carries: PA 127
- Crosses: Allegheny River
- Locale: Warren, Pennsylvania, United States
- Maintained by: PennDOT
- NBI #: 601011001014800

Characteristics
- Total length: 167.9 m (551 ft)
- Width: 7.3 m (24 ft)

History
- Constructed by: Bates & Rogers
- Built: 1933
- Rebuilt: 2002

The Tidioute Bridge is a truss bridge that carries Pennsylvania Route 127 across the Allegheny River between Tidioute and Limestone Township in Warren County, Pennsylvania. PA 127 uses the bridge to reach its terminus at U.S. Route 62.

The 1933 structure sits on the piers of a previous 19th-century bridge. It was rehabilitated in 2002 and forms a gateway into the small town of Tidioute.

== See also ==
- List of crossings of the Allegheny River
