= Hunter Station Bridge =

- Coordinates: 41°31′N 79°29′W
- Carries: Two lanes of US 62
- Crosses: Allegheny River
- Locale: Tionesta Township

Characteristics
- Design: Truss bridge
- Total length: 1,050 feet (320 m)
- Width: 32 feet (9.8 m)

History
- Opened: 1934

The Hunter Station Bridge is a truss bridge that carries U.S. Route 62 (US 62) across the Allegheny River in rural Tionesta Township in Forest County, Pennsylvania. The structure was named for a railroad stop on the long defunct Ridgway & Oil City Railroad.

The bridge features an unusual design, in which the roadway is built into the middle of the truss, as opposed to the bottom of the structure. This was done to prevent flooding from submerging the highway, which was relatively common before the upstream construction of the Kinzua Dam. In 1971, the bridge was reconstructed, several years after the completion of the dam.

== See also ==
- List of crossings of the Allegheny River
