= Eighth Street Bridge =

Eighth Street Bridge may refer to:

- Eighth Street Bridge (Allegheny River)
- Albertus L. Meyers Bridge, also known as Eighth Street Bridge, in Allentown, Pennsylvania
- Eighth Street Bridge (Passaic River)
- Eighth Street Bridge (Sioux Falls, South Dakota), listed on the National Register of Historic Places
