= Petroleum Street Bridge =

- Coordinates: 41°25′49″N 79°42′46″W
- Carries: Two lanes of US 62
- Crosses: Allegheny River
- Locale: Oil City, Pennsylvania

Characteristics
- Design: Girder bridge
- Total length: 705 feet
- Width: 36 ft

History
- Opened: 1995

Location
- Interactive map of Petroleum Street Bridge

The Petroleum Street Bridge is a girder bridge connecting the North Side and South Side neighborhoods of Oil City, Pennsylvania and crosses the Allegheny River. The bridge sits just downstream from the confluence of Oil Creek and the Allegheny River. The 1995 structure carries two lanes of U.S. Route 62 and was built during a decade of major refurbishments of Upper Allegheny crossings. Previously, a 1910 truss bridge stood on the site; this structure replaced an earlier wooden bridge.

== See also ==
- List of crossings of the Allegheny River
