= Allegheny River Turnpike Bridge =

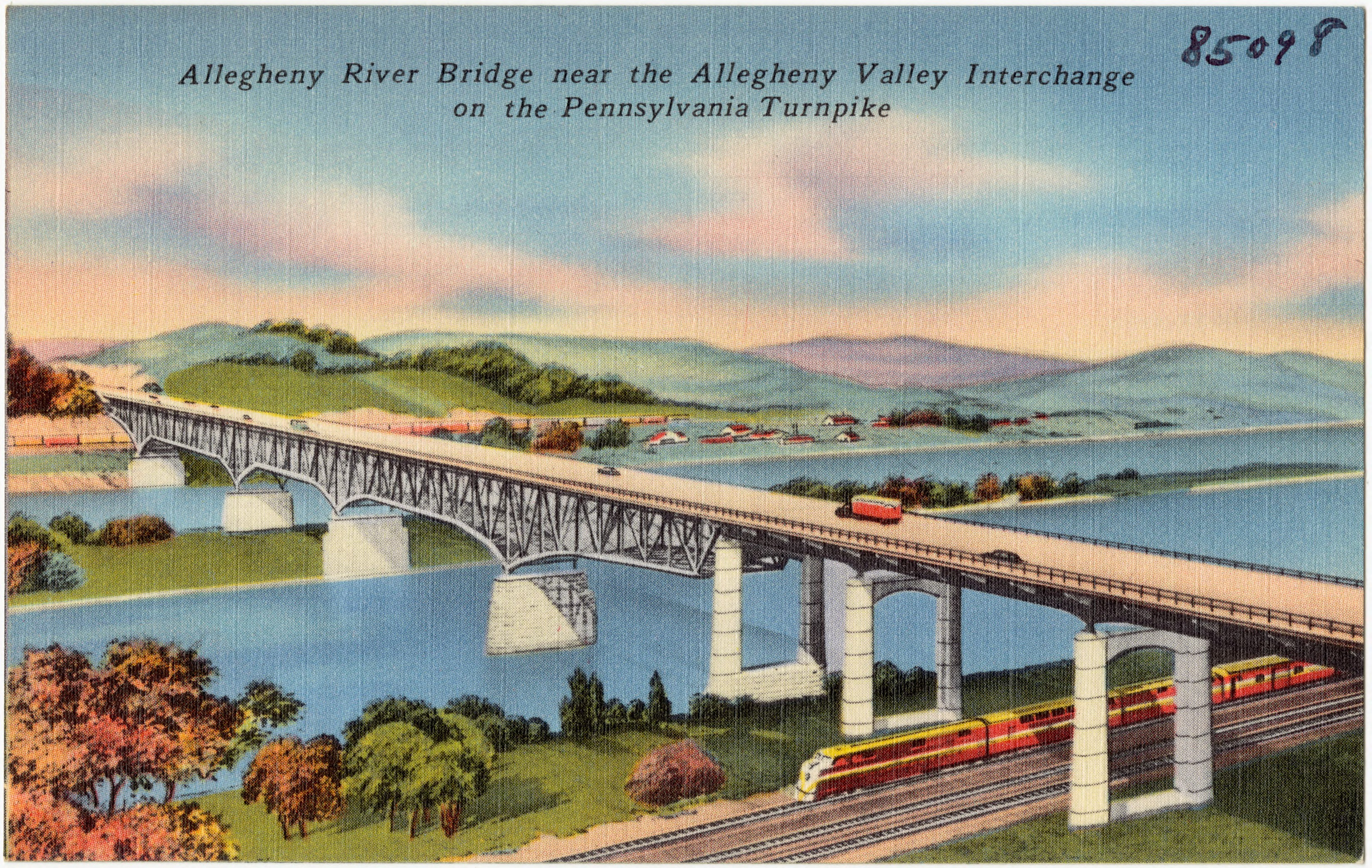
- The original Turnpike Bridge in a contemporary postcard
- Coordinates: 40.5373°N 79.8222°W
- Carries: 6 lanes of I-76 / Penna Turnpike
- Crosses: Allegheny River
- Locale: Harmar Township and Plum, Pennsylvania
- Official name: Pennsylvania Turnpike Allegheny River Bridge #21
- Maintained by: Pennsylvania Turnpike Commission

Characteristics
- Design: cast-in-place concrete segmental bridges
- Total length: 2,350 feet (720 m)
- Width: 61 feet (19 m)
- Longest span: 523 feet (159 m)

History
- Opened: November 2009
- Closed: 2008 (original)

Statistics
- Daily traffic: 34,800
- Toll: none

The Allegheny River Turnpike Bridge carries the Pennsylvania Turnpike (I-76) over the Allegheny River. The structure features a pair of twin 2,350’ cast-in-place concrete segmental bridges. This is the first of its type in Pennsylvania. It was constructed between 2007 and 2010 and is the second bridge to stand on this site. The original truss bridge was built between 1949 and 1951 by the engineering firm Modjeski & Masters; the crossing predates the Interstate System by several years.

The replacement bridge was designed by the engineering firm FIGG and built by Walsh Construction. The purpose of the new structure was to increase the capacity of traffic from two lanes in each direction to three; this was done to eliminate a bottleneck at the exit with Pennsylvania Route 28, which branches off at the bridge approach on the Harmar side of the river.

The replacement eastbound bridge opened in November 2009. It carried both eastbound and westbound traffic across the Allegheny River until the project was finished one year later.

On Tuesday, July 13, 2010, just after 10 a.m., the old steel structure of the Allegheny River Bridge was imploded with controlled demolition explosives. Roadway traffic was stopped for approximately 15–20 minutes, and river traffic was stopped for 24 hours for cleanup of the debris from the bridge.

== See also ==
- List of crossings of the Allegheny River
