= Veterans Memorial Bridge (Oil City, Pennsylvania) =

- Coordinates: 41°26′N 79°43′W
- Carries: State Street
- Crosses: Allegheny River
- Locale: Cranberry Township and Oil City, Pennsylvania
- Other name(s): State Street Bridge

Characteristics
- Design: Girder bridge
- Total length: 1013 feet
- Width: 42 ft

History
- Opened: 1990

The Veterans Memorial Bridge is a girder bridge connecting the North Side and South Side neighborhoods of Oil City, Pennsylvania. Built in 1990, the bridge was one of several similar structures constructed during a decade that saw major replacements of Upper Allegheny crossings; an original truss bridge on the site dated to the 1910s. The bridge, which features one northbound and two southbound lanes, is significantly longer than others along this stretch of river. This is mainly due to its crossing of a riverfront park on the Oil City shores.

== See also ==
- List of crossings of the Allegheny River
