= Allegheny Baptist Church =

Historic church in Pennsylvania, United States

- U.S. National Register of Historic Places
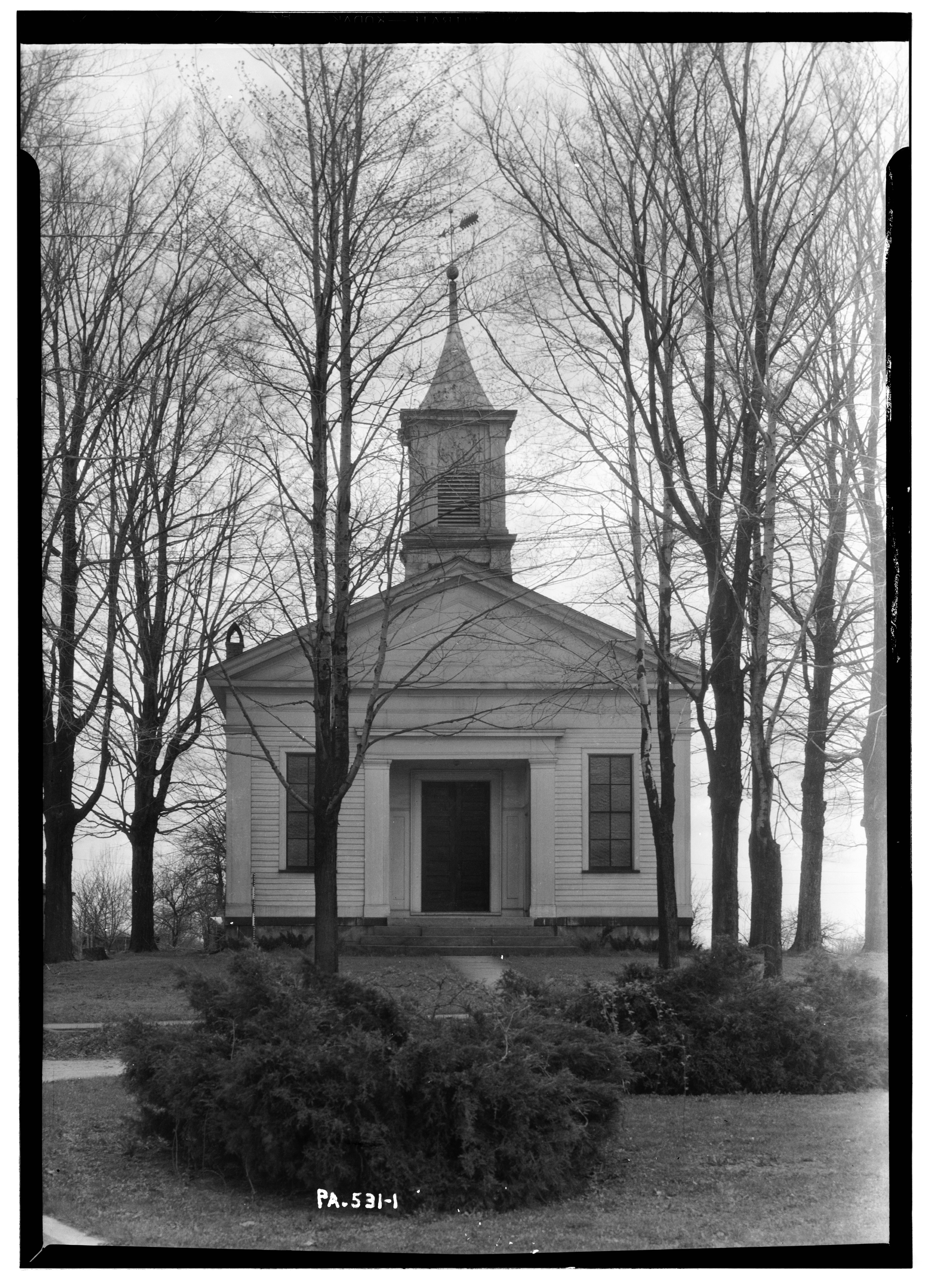
- Front of the church

- Location within Pennsylvania Location within the United States
- Location: PA 27 and Main St., Pleasantville, Pennsylvania
- Coordinates: 41°35′50″N 79°34′51″W
- Area: 0.2 acres (810 m^{2})
- Built: 1847-1849
- Architect: Beebe, Mamley Colton
- Architectural style: Greek Revival
- NRHP reference No.: 78002478
- Added to NRHP: December 15, 1978

Allegheny Baptist Church, known since 1890 as the Free Methodist Church of Pleasantville, is a historic Baptist church located at Pleasantville, Venango County, Pennsylvania. It was built between 1847 and 1849, and is a one-story, frame building, three bays by four bays, with a square tower. It features a wide, recessed front entrance. The tower includes a bell tower that rises 22 feet (6.7 m) above the roof.

The church was listed on the National Register of Historic Places in 1978.
