= Connely-Holeman House =

Historic house in Pennsylvania, United States

- U.S. National Register of Historic Places
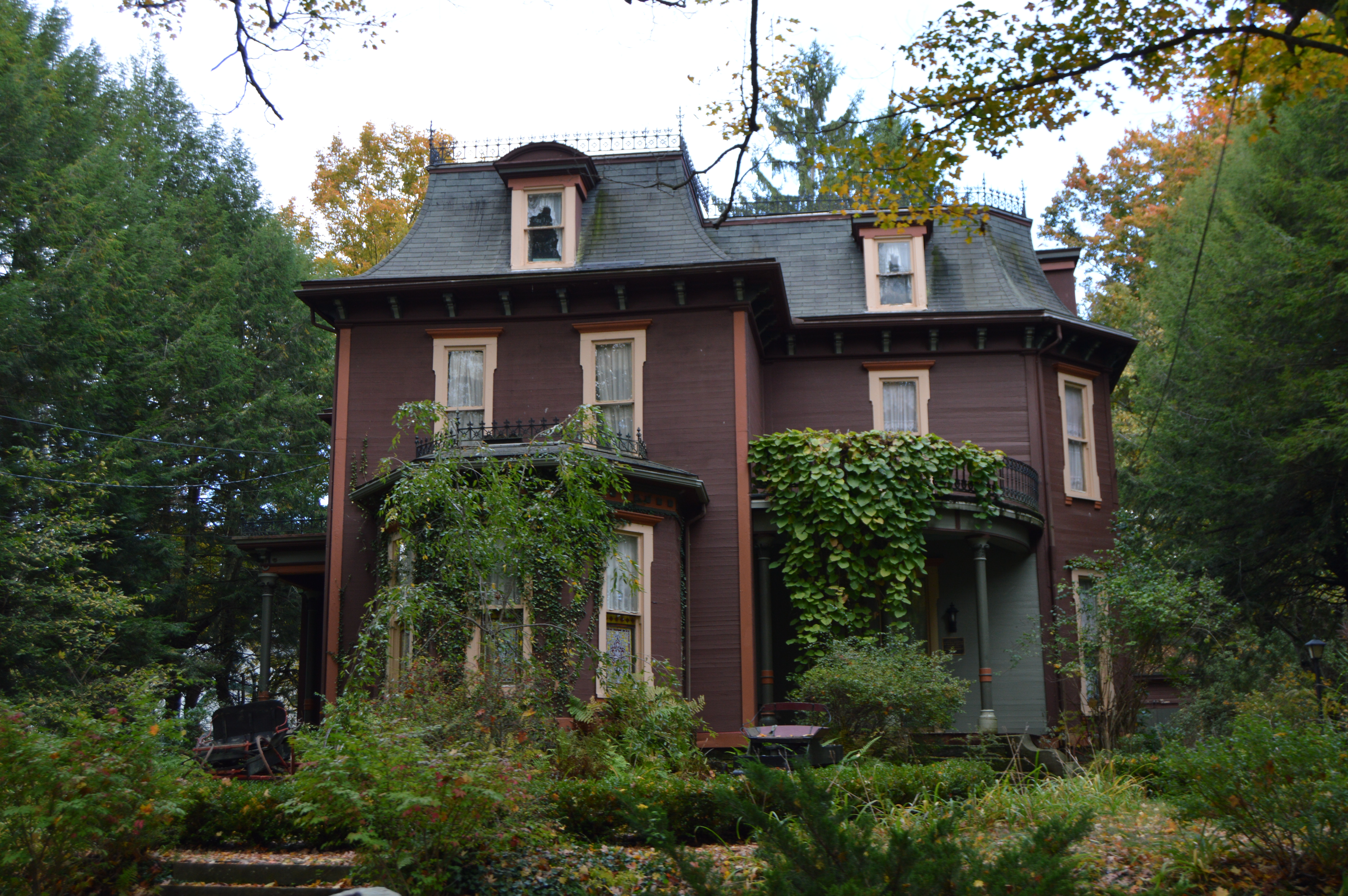
- Front of the house

- Location within Pennsylvania Location within the United States
- Location: 317 Chestnut St., Pleasantville, Pennsylvania
- Coordinates: 41°35′41″N 79°35′49″W
- Area: 7 acres (2.8 ha)
- Built: 1869-1871
- Architectural style: Second Empire
- NRHP reference No.: 07001080
- Added to NRHP: October 11, 2007

Connely-Holeman House is a historic home located at Pleasantville, Venango County, Pennsylvania. It was built between 1869 and 1871, and is a large three-story, square wood-frame building in the Second Empire style. It measures 50 feet by 50 feet and features two projecting bays, covered porches with Corinthian order columns, and a mansard roof with cast iron cresting. A rear addition was built in 1887.

It was listed on the National Register of Historic Places in 2007.
