= Kennerdell Bridge =

- Coordinates: 41°15′47″N 79°50′30″W
- Carries: Two lanes of Kennerdell Road (PA 3008)
- Crosses: Allegheny River
- Locale: Rockland Township and Clinton Township

Characteristics
- Design: Girder bridge
- Total length: 905 feet
- Width: 28 ft

History
- Opened: 2000

The Kennerdell Bridge is a girder bridge connecting Rockland Township and Clinton Township in Venango County, Pennsylvania that serves the tiny village of Kennerdell (with a population of only about 200). Originally, a 1907 truss bridge stood on this site. It was rehabilitated in 1981, but ultimately replaced in 2000. Only about 250 cars use the bridge each day

== See also ==
- List of crossings of the Allegheny River
