= Emeline Harriet Howe =

American writer and social activist

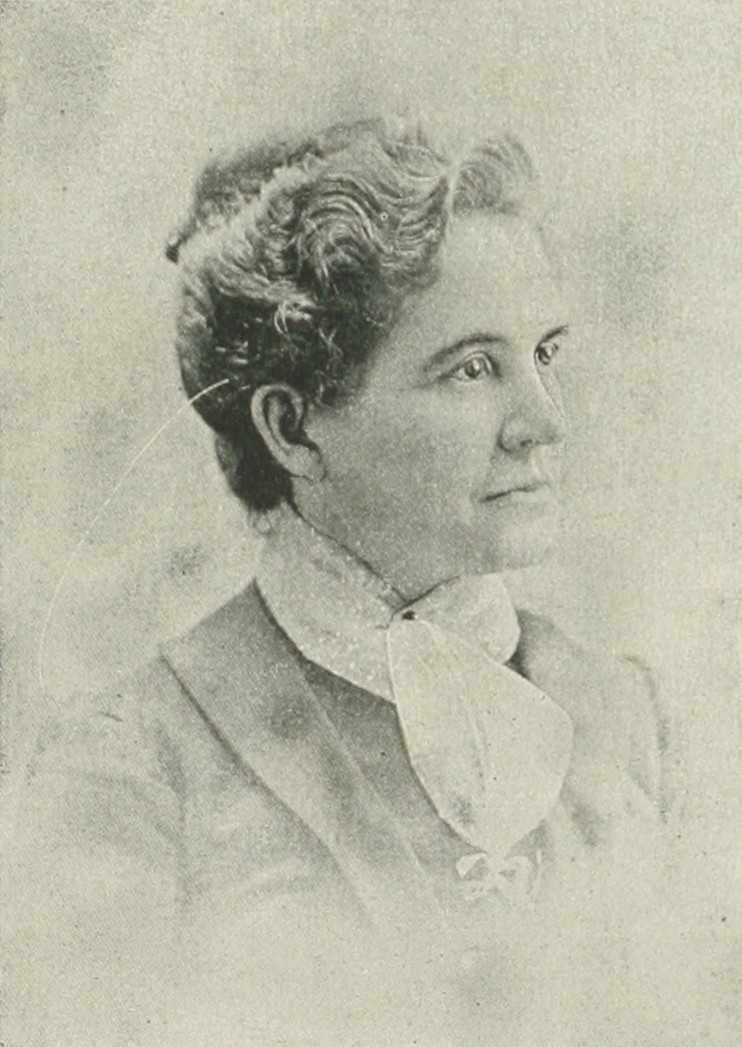
- Photo in A Woman of the Century
- Born: Emeline Harriet Siggins; January 2, 1844; West Hickory, Pennsylvania, U.S.
- Died: February 28, 1934 (aged 90); California, U.S.
- Resting place: Mount Washington Cemetery, Independence, Missouri, U.S.
- Education: Chautauqua Literary and Scientific Circle
- Occupations: Writer; poet; social activist
- Spouse: Wesley Curtis Howe (m. 1867; died 1914)
- Relatives: Matthew Simpson
- Writing career
- Language: English
- Notable work: A Basket of Fragments

Signature
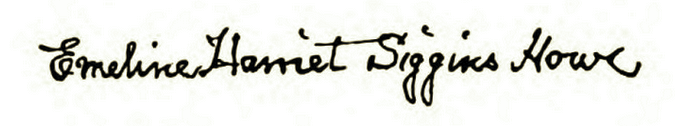

Emeline Harriet Howe (née, Siggins; pen name, Emeline Harriet Siggins Howe; January 2, 1844 – February 28, 1934) was an American poet, writer and social activist. She was a graduate of the first class of Chautauqua Literary and Scientific Circle (CLSC), in 1882, where she won the Bishop John H. Vincent gold medal, for passing the best examination in a class of over 200. Her poem, "From Height to Height", was read at Chautauqua. She served as the first President of the Ladies Circle of the Grand Army of the Republic known as the Lincoln Circle No. 19, of Kansas City, Missouri. A member of the Methodist Church for many years, Howe was also a long-time contributor to The Union Signal, Christian Advocate, and other religious publications. Howe died in 1934.

== Early life ==
Emeline Harriet Siggins was born in West Hickory, Pennsylvania, January 2, 1844. Of Scotch-Irish ancestry, she was the eldest daughter of Rachel Dawson and George Simpson Siggins. Her grandparents were among the pioneer settlers in that part of the country. Her father's farm had been the favored camping-ground of the Native Americans in early times. Her father was a lover of poets, and often, on his return from rafting lumber to Pittsburgh, brought to his home the best literature of ancient and modern times.

Howe acquired such an education as the schools of the time afforded. She grew up with a love of nature, art and literature, inspired at an early age to write verses for publication.

The family belonged to Methodist Episcopal Church from the days of John Wesley, whom they esteemed as a true spiritual descendant of the apostles, and were co-laborers with him. Howe had a pleasant memory of a visit of Bishop Matthew Simpson to her father's home, the bishop being a relative of the family.

== Career ==
At an early age, she began contributing to Peterson's Magazine, Godey's Lady's Book, Christian Advocate, Gospel in All Lands, Divine Life, Magazine of Poetry, and other journals. Writing poems was only an incident in her active life, although her published ones would make a volume. Not content with the education she received in her younger days, she became a lifelong and continual student, graduating in 1882 from the first class of the CLSC, "The Pioneers". There, she completed several courses in Normal and Bible Class work, and read many of the works of the best English authors. Her poem "From Height to Height", written on the motto of her class, was read at Chautauqua.

Howe was a thorough and constant Bible student. This explained her interest, activity, and success in religious and reformatory work. She was a member of the first organized Woman's Christian Temperance Union (W.C.T.U.), and filled many of the county and state offices. She was also an ardent supporter of the Woman's Foreign and Home missionary societies. In addition, she lectured and wrote for Christian and philanthropic organizations.

== Style and themes ==
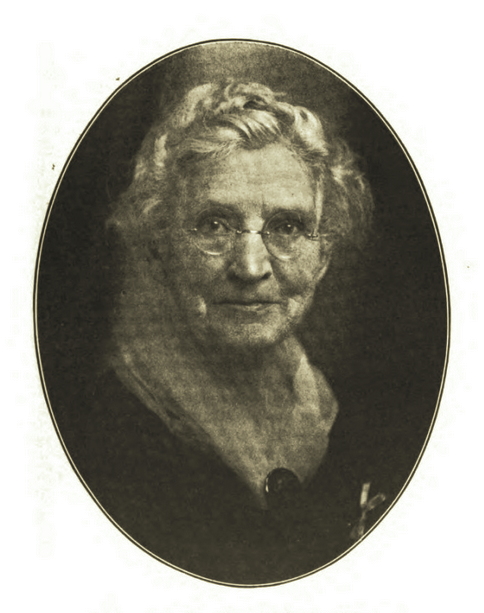
1924

Her interpretation of nature, if not deep, was always true, and her "verses", as she persisted in modestly calling them, showed genuine poetic feeling. After some years past, the cares of a family and the varied experiences connected with the large business enterprises in which her husband was engaged, had developed and matured the graces of Christian motherhood and womanhood. At this time, her poems became rich in religious sentiment, experience and comfort. Her poems grew out of her experience and sympathy with others. They were written with a purpose, presenting redeemed human nature without error, exaggeration, or awkwardness. She found that to write down the language of the heart brought submission, relief, comfort and joy.

== Personal life ==
On January 1, 1867, she married Capt. Wesley Curtis Howe (1833–1914). He served in the Civil War, shared with Chaplain Charles Caldwell McCabe the experiences of prison life, and left a record for distinguished military service Their home was in Franklin, Pennsylvania. Howe was the mother of five sons. She died February 28, 1934, in California, and was buried at the Mount Washington Cemetery in Independence, Missouri.

== Selected works ==
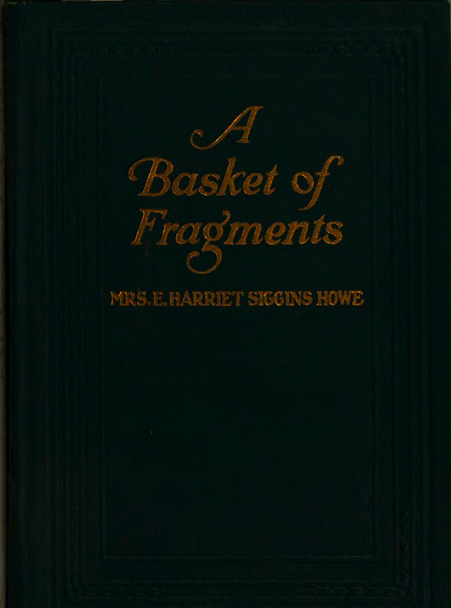
A basket of fragments, 1924

- Poems
- A Basket of Fragments, 1924
