= Emlenton Low Level Bridge =

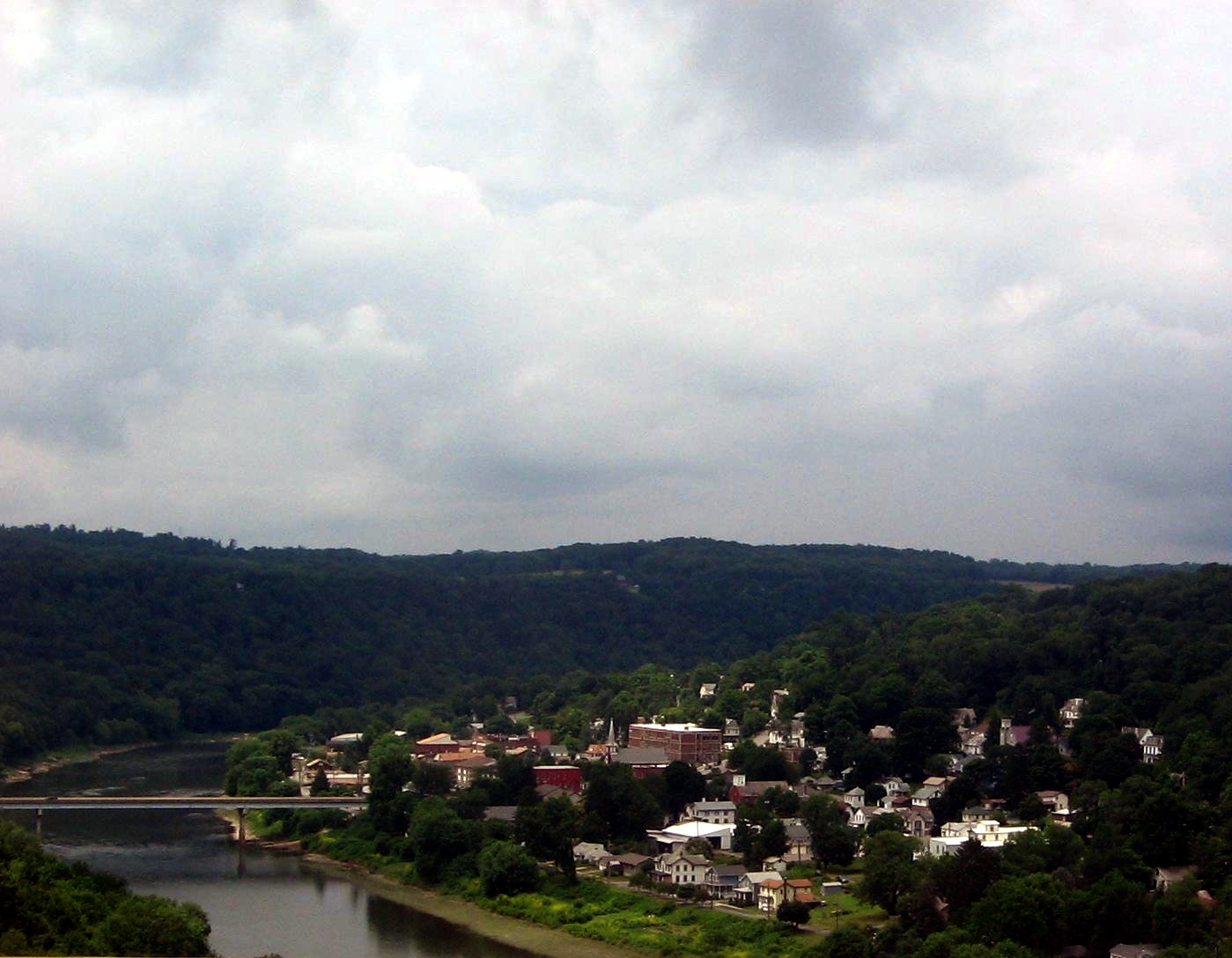
- The borough of Emlenton and the Emlenton Low Level Bridge, viewed from the Emlenton Bridge, Pennsylvania
- Coordinates: 41.1757°N 79.7081°W
- Carries: Two lanes of PA 38
- Crosses: Allegheny River
- Locale: Emlenton, Pennsylvania

Characteristics
- Design: Girder bridge
- Total length: 673 feet (205 m)
- Width: 36 feet (11 m)

History
- Opened: 1987

Location
- Interactive map of Emlenton Low Level Bridge

The Emlenton Low Level Bridge is a girder bridge that spans the Allegheny River at Emlenton in the U.S state of Pennsylvania. It connects two separate portions of the borough in Venango and Clarion counties. It replaced, an 1883 truss bridge that stood just upstream, which replaced several previous wooden structures; the modern bridge was constructed in 1987. This bridge is dwarfed by its more famous nearby cousin, the 1968 Emlenton Bridge along Interstate 80.

== See also ==
- List of bridges documented by the Historic American Engineering Record in Pennsylvania
- List of crossings of the Allegheny River
