= West Hickory, Pennsylvania =

Unincorporated community in Pennsylvania, US

- Unincorporated community
- Location within Pennsylvania
- Coordinates: 41°34′07″N 79°24′29″W
- Country: United States
- State: Pennsylvania
- County: Forest
- Elevation: 1,093 ft (333 m)
- Time zone: UTC-5 (Eastern (EST))
  - Summer (DST): UTC-4 (EDT)
- ZIP code: 16370
- Area code: 814
- GNIS feature ID: 1210100

West Hickory is an unincorporated community in Forest County, Pennsylvania, United States. The community is located along the Allegheny River and Pennsylvania Route 127, 5.6 miles (9.0 km) north-northeast of Tionesta. West Hickory has a post office with ZIP code 16370.

== Notable person ==
- Emeline Harriet Howe (1844–1934), poet
