= Eighth Street Bridge (Allegheny River) =

Bridge in Pennsylvania, United States

- Coordinates: 41.3890°N 79.8191°W
- Carries: Two lanes of US 322
- Crosses: Allegheny River
- Locale: Cranberry Township and Franklin, Pennsylvania

Characteristics
- Design: Girder bridge
- Total length: 921 feet
- Width: 30 ft

History
- Opened: 1986

The Eighth Street Bridge is a girder bridge connecting Cranberry Township and Franklin in the U.S. state of Pennsylvania. The current 1986 structure is similar to several others that were constructed along the river during the same era; it replaced a 1920s truss bridge that was an original construction from the founding of U.S. Route 322.

== See also ==
- List of crossings of the Allegheny River
