= Freeport Rail Bridge =

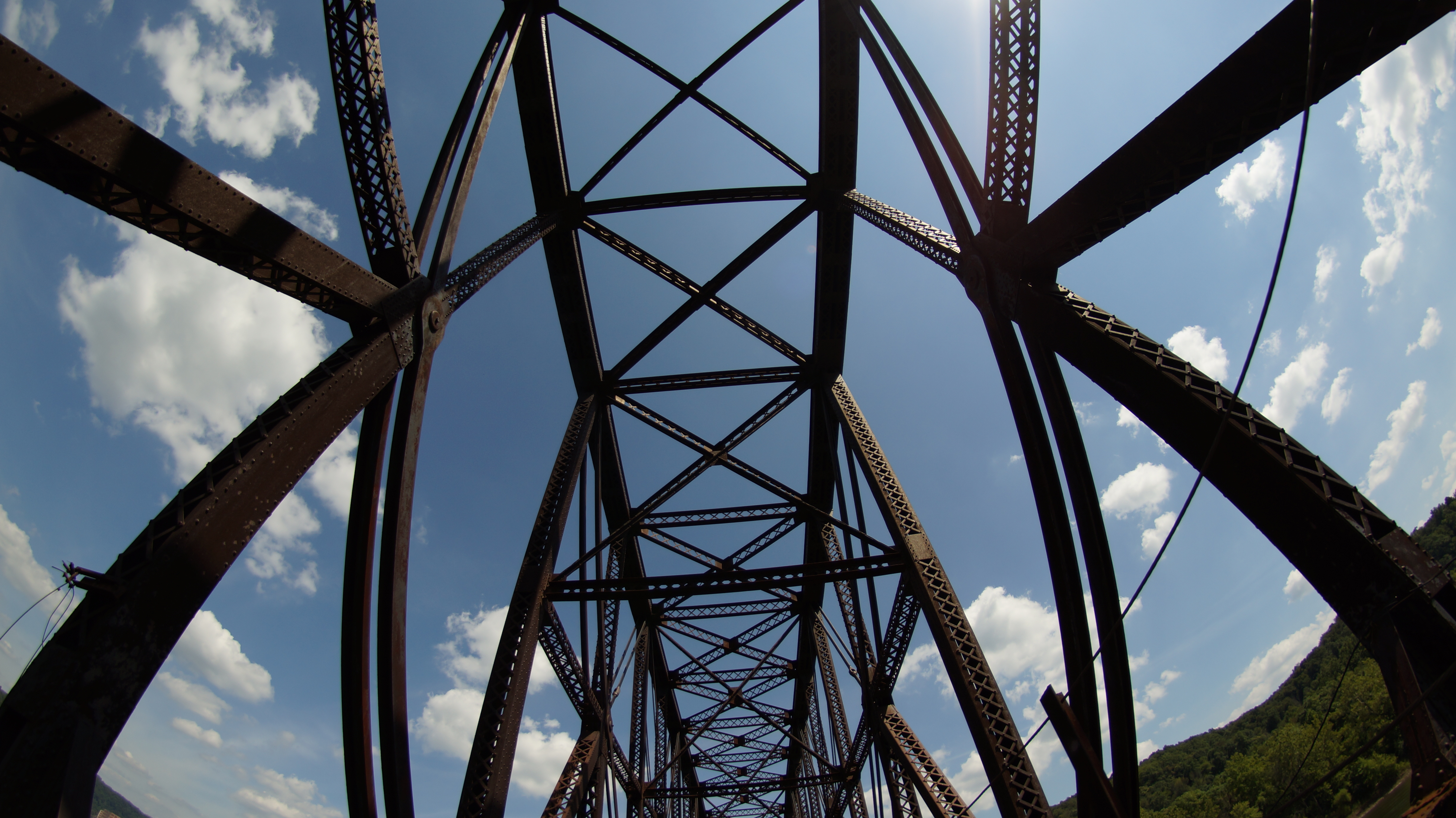
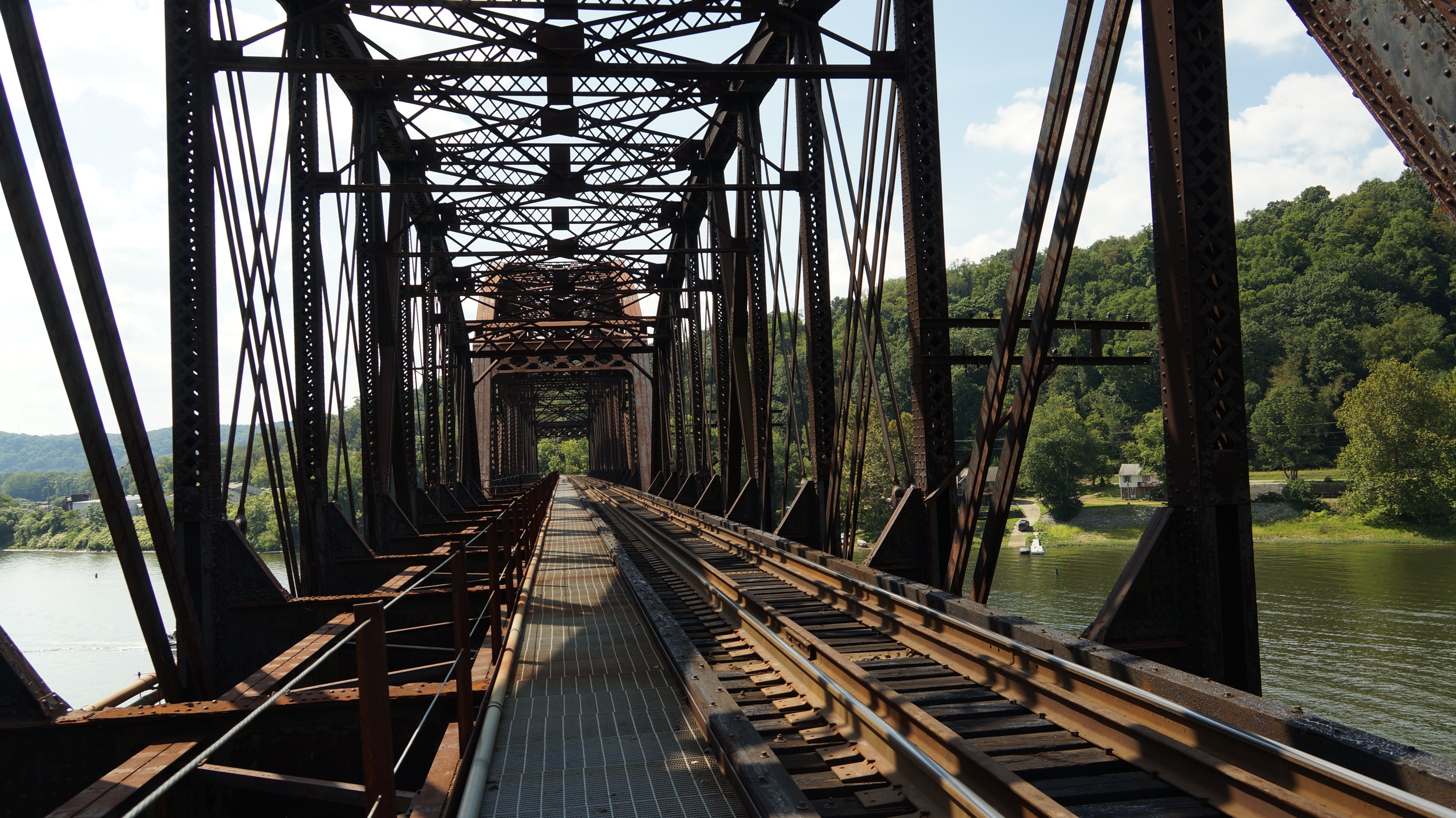
- Freeport Rail Bridge iron work Freeport Rail Bridge. Looking toward Freeport from Allegheny Township.
- Coordinates: 40.6773°N 79.6707°W
- Carries: 1 track of the Norfolk Southern Railway
- Crosses: Allegheny River
- Locale: Freeport and Allegheny Township

Characteristics
- Design: truss bridge
- Material: Steel
- Total length: 1105 ft.
- Piers in water: 4

History
- Opened: 1950

Location
- Interactive map of Freeport Rail Bridge

The Freeport Rail Bridge is a truss bridge that carries the Norfolk Southern Railway across the Allegheny River between Freeport and Allegheny Township in Pennsylvania.

A structure originally created on this site by the Pennsylvania Railroad as part of their West Penn Line in 1866. In 1895, the railroad replaced this bridge; the third and current incarnation was completed in 1950, along with new approach ramps that eliminated a narrow tunnel.

Prior to 1957, passenger service was carried along this line (the Conemaugh Line) alongside freight. Following the decline of the PRR, Conrail took over control of the bridge. Currently, it is operated as part of the Pittsburgh Division of Norfolk Southern.

== See also ==
- List of crossings of the Allegheny River
