= Cambridge Main Street Bridge =

Concrete bowstring arch bridge in Cambridge, Ontario

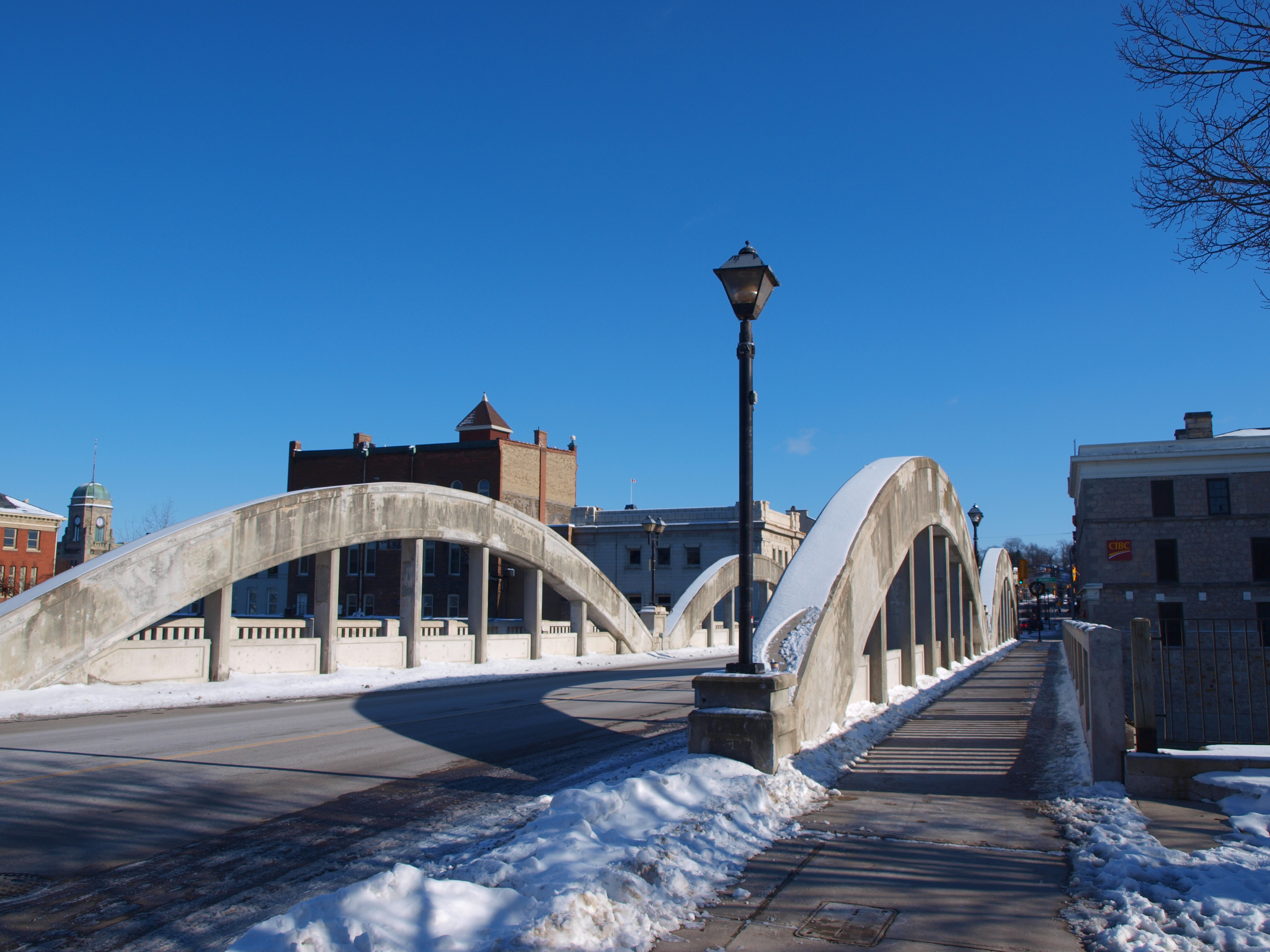
- Cambridge Main Street Bridge
- Coordinates: 43.3588°N 80.3166°W
- Carries: Motor vehicles Pedestrians and bicycles
- Crosses: Grand River
- Locale: Cambridge, Ontario

Characteristics
- Design: Bowstring arch bridge
- Total length: 57.3 m (188 ft)

History
- Designer: Archibald C. Crealock
- Opened: December 22, 1931; 94 years ago

Statistics
- Toll: Free both ways

Location
- Interactive map of Cambridge Main Street Bridge

The Cambridge Main Street Bridge is a concrete bowstring arch bridge located in Cambridge, Ontario. It cost approximately $55,000 and was built by W.H. Yates Construction Company Limited, with Archibald C. Crealock listed as the principal designer. Construction lasted throughout 1931 and the official opening was held on December 22, 1931.

The bridge has a total length of 57.3 meters (188 feet) and runs from the Melville Street portion of Queens Square on the west side of Galt to Water Street on the east side. There is a single support in the middle, resulting in two spans of approximately 28 meters (92 feet). There are two lanes for vehicular traffic and sidewalks on either side for pedestrians.

== History ==
The interwar period was a time of increased wealth and population growth in southern Ontario. As a result, the number of automobiles on the roads surged drastically, which created a need for updated roadways and increased means of crossing the Grand River. To meet this need, four bridges were built in the area: this bridge, the Freeport Bridge and Bridgeport Bridge in Kitchener, and the Caledonia Bridge (since renamed) in Caledonia.

On August 19, 1982, it was designated as a historic place under Part IV of the Ontario Heritage Act (By-law 2225) and given Municipal ID (IDM) number 10817. It is also listed on the Ontario Heritage Bridge list.

In 2009, the bridge underwent repairs and reconstruction. It re-opened to the public in July, 2009.

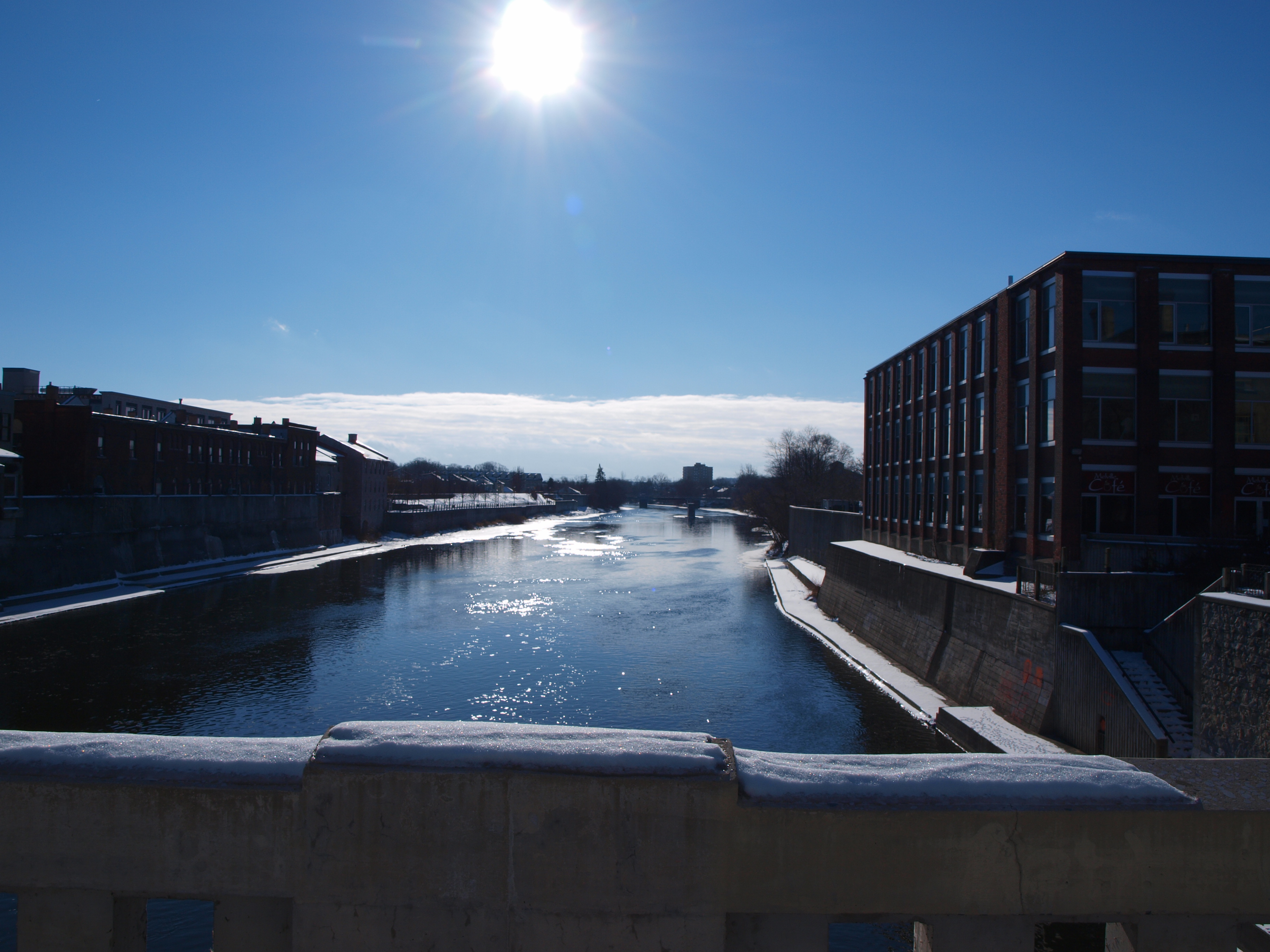
A view from the bridge, looking south to the Concession Street Bridge

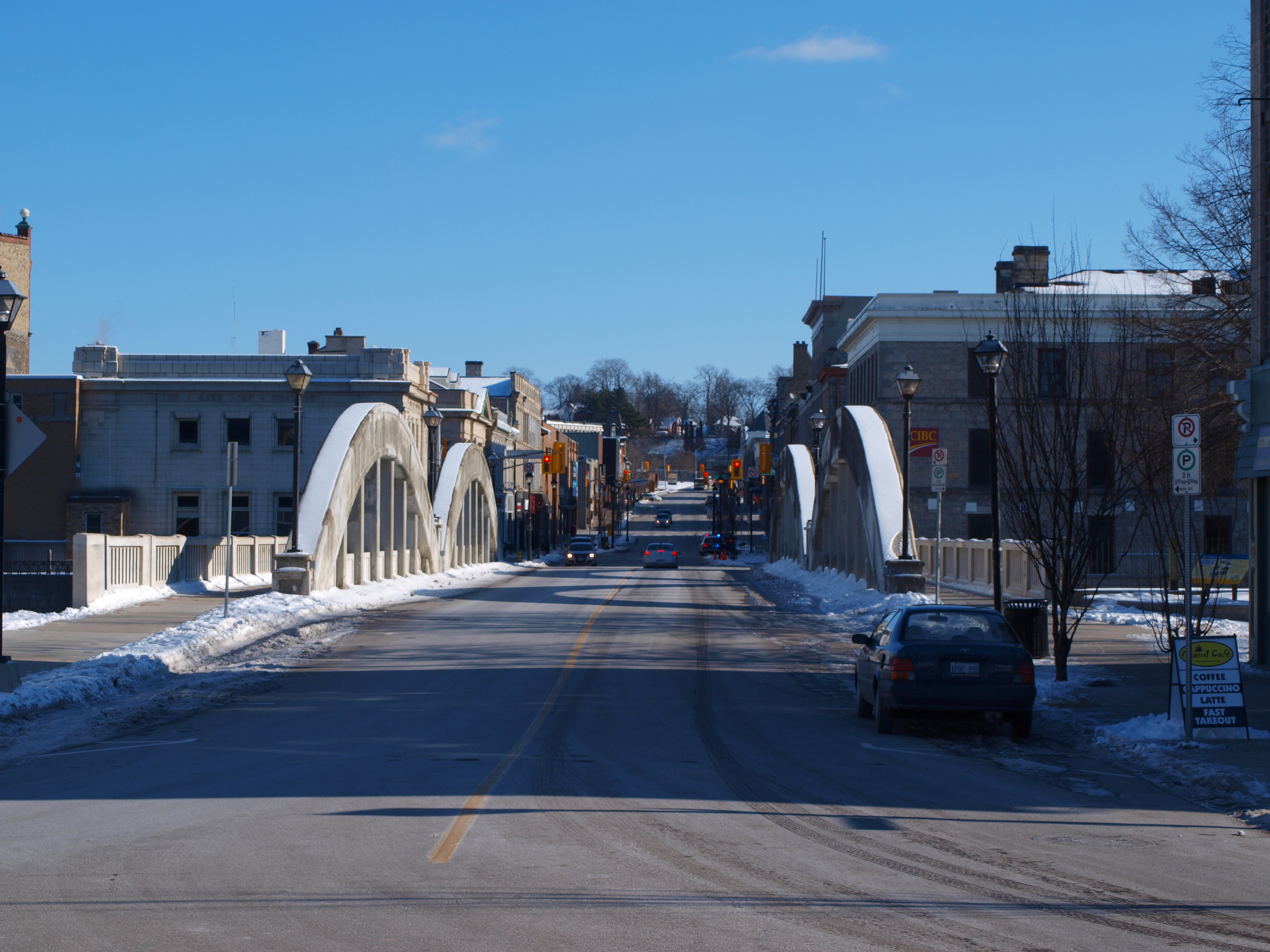
A view of the bridge from the west side.
