= Tionesta Township, Forest County, Pennsylvania =

Township in Pennsylvania, United States

Coordinates: 41°31′00″N 79°28′59″W

Tionesta Township, Pennsylvania
- Township
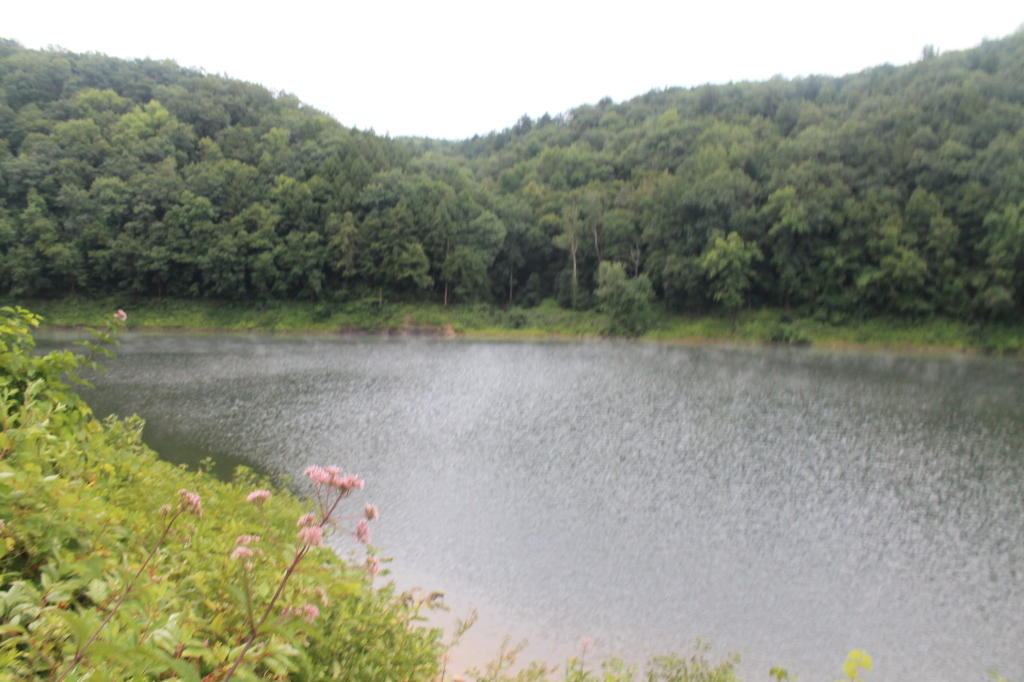
- Tionesta Lake, south of Tionesta Borough

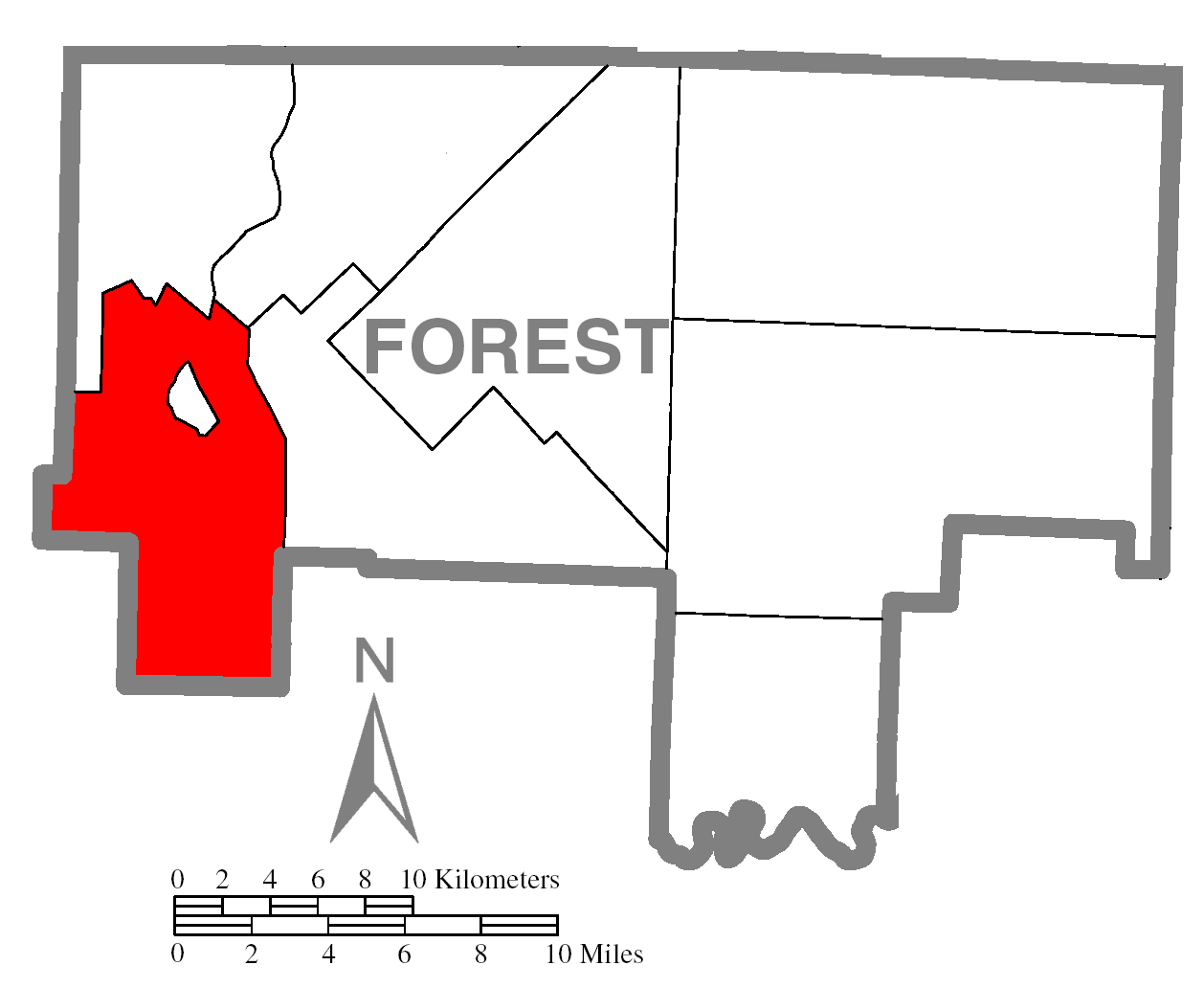
- Map of Forest County, Pennsylvania highlighting Tionesta Township

- Map of Forest County, Pennsylvania
- Country: United States
- State: Pennsylvania
- County: Forest
- Settled: 1795

Government
  - Type: Board of Supervisors

Area
  - Total: 46.46 sq mi (120.32 km^{2})
  - Land: 44.98 sq mi (116.49 km^{2})
  - Water: 1.48 sq mi (3.84 km^{2})

Population (2020)
  - Total: 666
  - Estimate (2023): 641
  - Density: 14.8/sq mi (5.72/km^{2})
- Time zone: UTC-5 (Eastern (EST))
  - Summer (DST): UTC-4 (EDT)
- Area code: 814
- FIPS code: 42-053-76864

Tionesta Township is a township in Forest County, Pennsylvania, United States. The population was 666 at the time of the 2020 census, up from the total of 729 that was documented by the 2010, up from 610 at the 2000 census.

== History ==
Tionesta Township took its name from Tionesta Creek.

== Geography ==
The township is located in the southwestern corner of Forest County, bordered to the south by Clarion County and to the west by Venango County. The township surrounds the borough of Tionesta, a separate municipality.

The Allegheny River crosses the township from its northern to its western border while forming part of the border between the township and Tionesta borough. Tionesta Creek joins the Allegheny from the east, just south of Tionesta borough. Tionesta Dam impounds the creek southeast of the borough, forming Tionesta Lake.

U.S. Route 62 passes through the township and the borough following the Allegheny, leading north to Warren and southwest to Oil City. Pennsylvania Route 36 crosses the township and joins US-62 to cross the Allegheny at Tionesta. PA 36 leads northwest to Pleasantville and southeast to Brookville.

According to the United States Census Bureau, Tionesta Township has a total area of 46.4 square miles (120.3 km^{2}), of which 45.0 square miles (116.5 km^{2}) is land and 1.5 square miles (3.8 km^{2}), or 3.19%, is water.

== Demographics ==
Historical population
Census	Pop.	Note	%±
2000	610		—
2010	729		19.5%
2020	666		−8.6%
2023 (est.)	641		−3.8%

As of the census of 2000, there were 610 people, 260 households, and 191 families residing in the township. The population density was 13.6 people per square mile (5.2/km^{2}). There were 898 housing units at an average density of 20.0/sq mi (7.7/km^{2}). The racial makeup of the township was 99.18% White, 0.16% African American, 0.16% Native American, and 0.49% from two or more races. Hispanic or Latino of any race were 0.49% of the population.

There were 260 households, out of which 24.6% had children under the age of 18 living with them, 62.7% were married couples living together, 6.2% had a female householder with no husband present, and 26.5% were non-families. 23.8% of all households were made up of individuals, and 11.9% had someone living alone who was 65 years of age or older. The average household size was 2.35 and the average family size was 2.73.

In the township the population was spread out, with 19.5% under the age of 18, 4.3% from 18 to 24, 23.8% from 25 to 44, 31.0% from 45 to 64, and 21.5% who were 65 years of age or older. The median age was 47 years. For every 100 females there were 106.8 males. For every 100 females age 18 and over, there were 99.6 males.

The median income for a household in the township was $35,455, and the median income for a family was $39,286. Males had a median income of $30,795 versus $21,442 for females. The per capita income for the township was $15,404. About 8.3% of families and 9.5% of the population were below the poverty line, including 12.9% of those under age 18 and 7.6% of those age 65 or over.
