= Fagundus, Pennsylvania =

Former community in Pennsylvania, US

Coordinates: 41°37′57″N 79°25′59″W

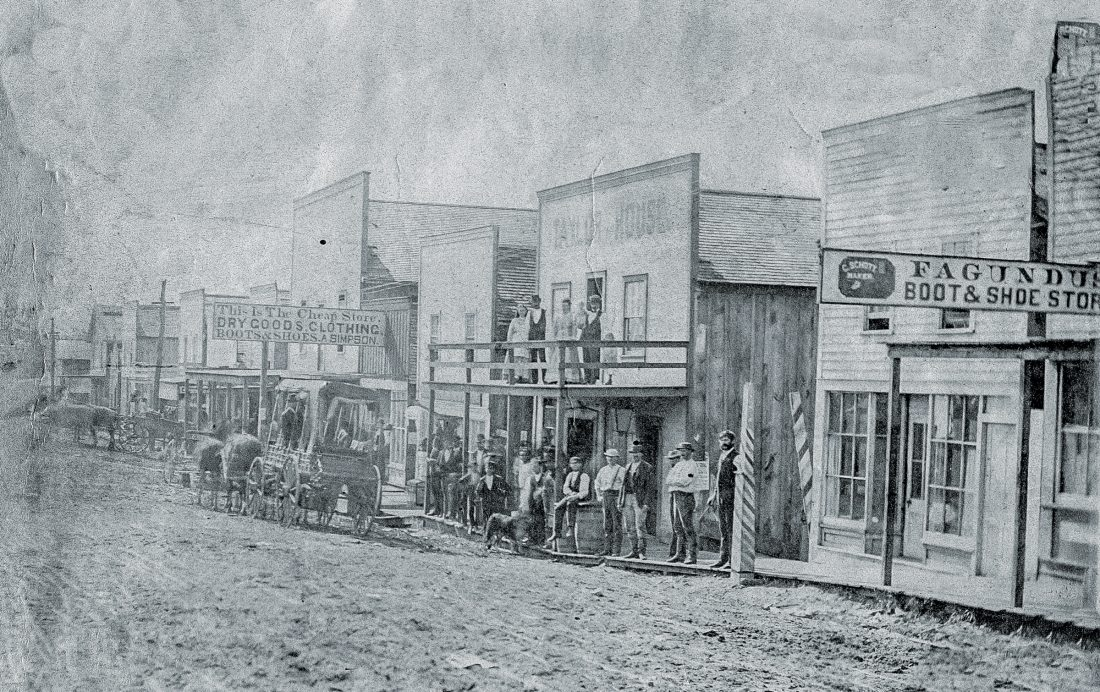
Fagundus

Fagundus is an extinct town in Forest and Warren counties, in the U.S. state of Pennsylvania.

== History ==
Fagundus had its start in the 1860s during an area oil boom. The community was named after Charles Fagundus, a pioneer settler. A variant name was "Fagundus Corners".
