= Limestone Township, Warren County, Pennsylvania =

Township in Pennsylvania, United States

Coordinates: 41°40′00″N 79°22′59″W

Limestone Township
- Township
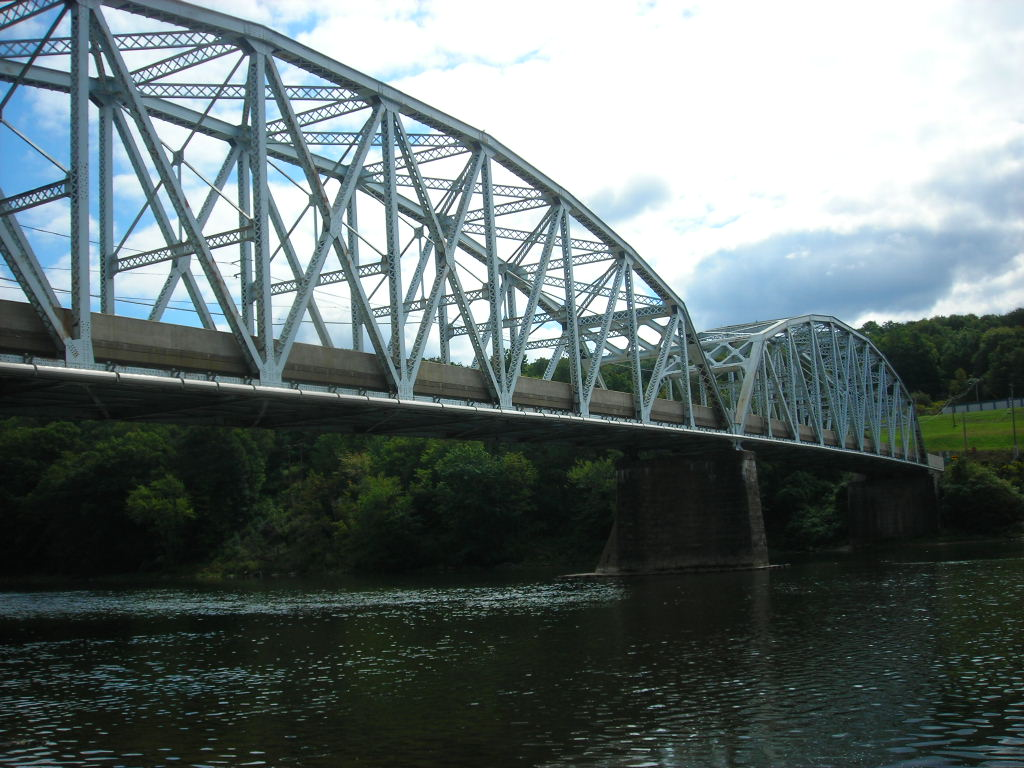
- The Tidioute Bridge over the Allegheny River

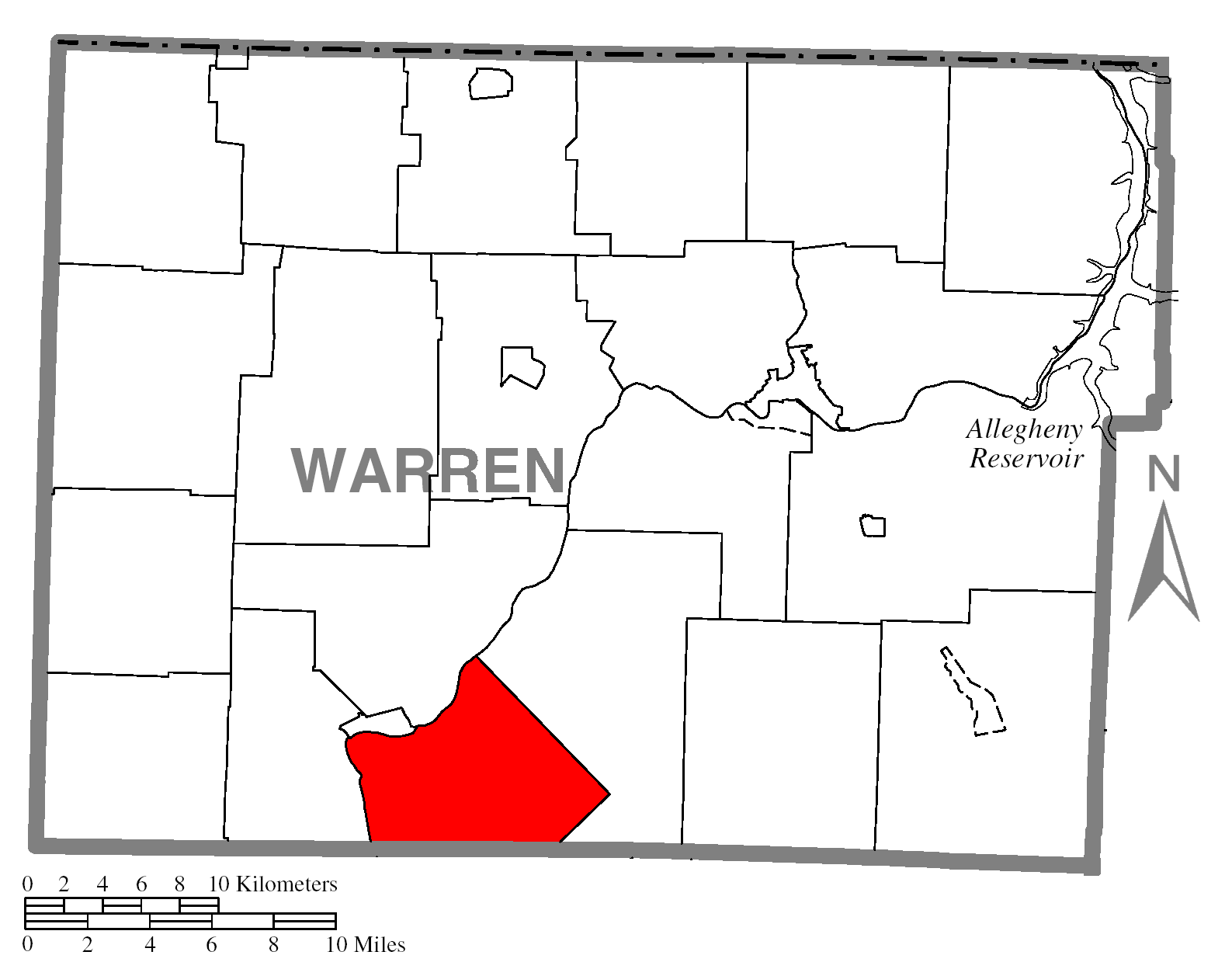
- Location of Limestone Township in Warren County

- Location of Warren County in Pennsylvania
- Country: United States
- State: Pennsylvania
- County: Warren

Area
  - Total: 31.91 sq mi (82.64 km^{2})
  - Land: 31.42 sq mi (81.39 km^{2})
  - Water: 0.48 sq mi (1.25 km^{2})

Population (2020)
  - Total: 311
  - Estimate (2024): 299
  - Density: 12.1/sq mi (4.69/km^{2})
- Time zone: UTC-4 (EST)
  - Summer (DST): UTC-5 (EDT)
- Area code: 814
- FIPS code: 42-123-43372

Limestone Township is a township in Warren County, Pennsylvania, United States. The population was 311 at the 2020 census, down from 403 at the 2010 census and 418 at the 2000 census.

== Geography ==
According to the United States Census Bureau, the township has a total area of 31.5 square miles (82 km^{2}), of which 31.1 square miles (81 km^{2}) is land and 0.4 square miles (1.0 km^{2}) (1.33%) is water.

== Demographics ==
Historical population
Census	Pop.	Note	%±
2000	418		—
2010	403		−3.6%
2020	311		−22.8%
2024 (est.)	299		−3.9%
U.S. Decennial Census

As of the census of 2000, there were 418 people, 190 households, and 118 families residing in the township. The population density was 13.4 people per square mile (5.2 people/km^{2}). There were 1,109 housing units at an average density of 35.6 per square mile (13.7/km^{2}). The racial makeup of the township was 99.28% White, 0.24% Asian, 0.24% from other races, and 0.24% from two or more races.

There were 190 households, out of which 24.7% had children under the age of 18 living with them, 50.0% were married couples living together, 10.0% had a female householder with no husband present, and 37.4% were non-families. 32.1% of all households were made up of individuals, and 14.7% had someone living alone who was 65 years of age or older. The average household size was 2.20 and the average family size was 2.81.

In the township the population was spread out, with 22.7% under the age of 18, 4.3% from 18 to 24, 23.9% from 25 to 44, 29.4% from 45 to 64, and 19.6% who were 65 years of age or older. The median age was 44 years. For every 100 females there were 101.9 males. For every 100 females age 18 and over, there were 101.9 males.

The median income for a household in the township was $27,143, and the median income for a family was $30,938. Males had a median income of $28,438 versus $20,278 for females. The per capita income for the township was $16,577. About 5.3% of families and 8.2% of the population were below the poverty line, including 9.1% of those under age 18 and none of those age 65 or over.

== Notable people ==
- Frank Saddler, (9 September 1864 –25 March 1921) Broadway orchestrator and music arranger; lived in Limestone Township for eight years during his childhood; was a member of Limestone's Harmony Society community
