= Pleasantville, Venango County, Pennsylvania =

Borough in Pennsylvania, US

Pleasantville, Pennsylvania
- Borough
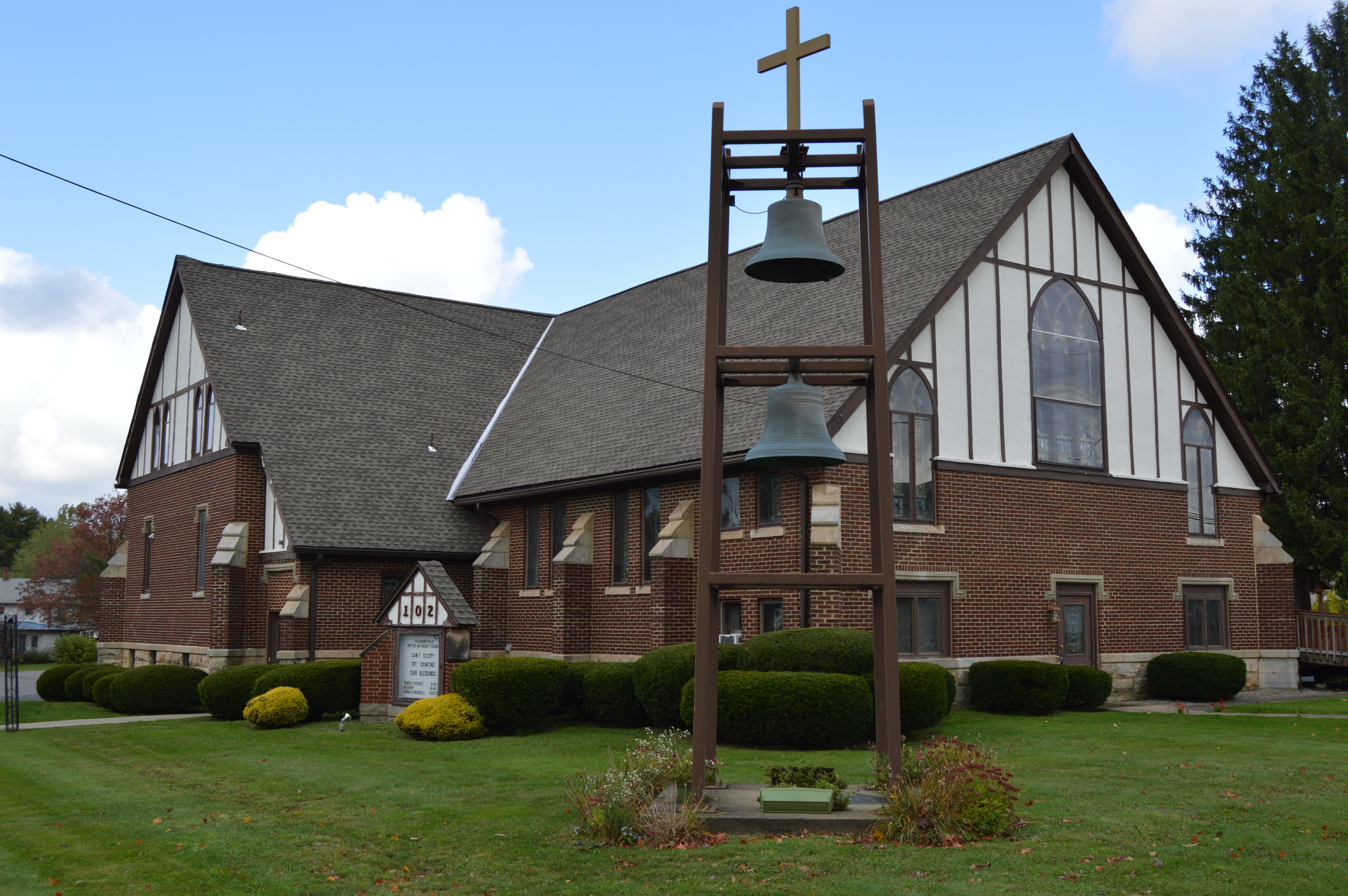
- Pleasantville United Methodist Church

- Location of Pleasantville in Venango County, Pennsylvania.

- Location within Pennsylvania Location within the United States
- Coordinates: 41°35′37″N 79°34′51″W
- Country: United States
- State: Pennsylvania
- County: Venango
- Settled: 1821
- Incorporated: 1850

Government
  - Type: Borough Council

Area
  - Total: 0.95 sq mi (2.46 km^{2})
  - Land: 0.95 sq mi (2.46 km^{2})
  - Water: 0 sq mi (0.00 km^{2})

Population (2020)
  - Total: 846
  - Density: 890.3/sq mi (343.75/km^{2})
- Time zone: UTC-5 (Eastern (EST))
  - Summer (DST): UTC-4 (EDT)
- Zip code: 16341
- Area code: 814
- FIPS code: 42-61512
- GNIS feature ID: 1215640
- Website: https://pleasantvilleboro.org/

Pleasantville is a borough in Venango County, Pennsylvania, United States. The population was 841 at the 2020 census, and 892 in 2010. It was an early oil 'boom town', and the population jumped from 291 to 1,598 between 1860 and 1870. But the boom soon passed, and the population shrank to 855 by 1880, and has remained fairly stable since then.

== History ==
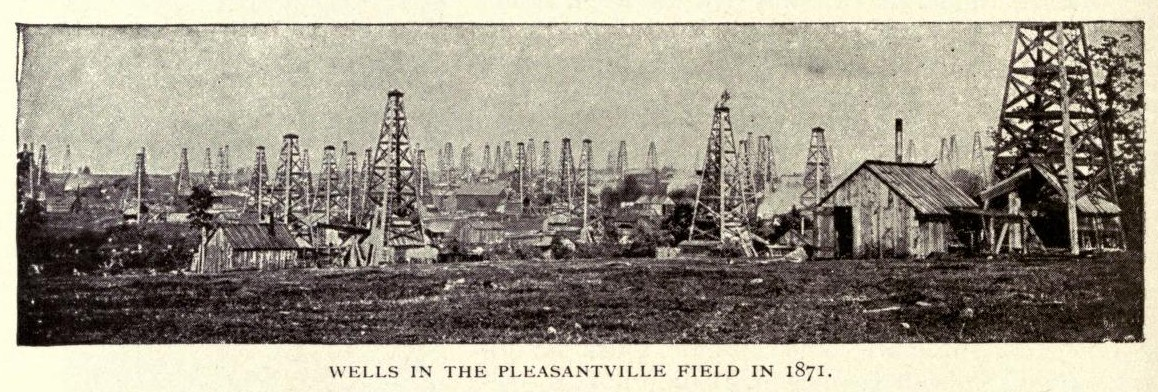
The Pleasantville Oil Field in 1871

The Allegheny Baptist Church and Connely-Holeman House are listed on the National Register of Historic Places.

== Geography ==
According to the United States Census Bureau, the borough has a total area of 1.0 square mile (2.5 km^{2}), all land.

== Demographics ==
Historical population
Census	Pop.	Note	%±
1860	291		—
1870	1,598		449.1%
1880	855		−46.5%
1890	928		8.5%
1900	671		−27.7%
1910	702		4.6%
1920	652		−7.1%
1930	627		−3.8%
1940	689		9.9%
1950	704		2.2%
1960	940		33.5%
1970	1,005		6.9%
1980	1,099		9.4%
1990	991		−9.8%
2000	850		−14.2%
2010	892		4.9%
2020	841		−5.7%
2021 (est.)	832		−1.1%

As of the census of 2000, there were 850 people, 340 households, and 249 families residing in the borough. The population density was 887.7 inhabitants per square mile (342.7/km^{2}). There were 369 housing units at an average density of 385.4 per square mile (148.8/km^{2}). The racial makeup of the borough was 98.71% White, 0.12% African American, 0.12% Native American, 0.24% Asian, and 0.82% from two or more races. Hispanic or Latino of any race were 0.24% of the population.

There were 340 households, out of which 30.6% had children under the age of 18 living with them, 63.8% were married couples living together, 5.9% had a female householder with no husband present, and 26.5% were non-families. 23.8% of all households were made up of individuals, and 14.7% had someone living alone who was 65 years of age or older. The average household size was 2.50 and the average family size was 2.94.

In the borough the population was spread out, with 24.4% under the age of 18, 7.2% from 18 to 24, 25.5% from 25 to 44, 23.6% from 45 to 64, and 19.3% who were 65 years of age or older. The median age was 40 years. For every 100 females there were 98.1 males. For every 100 females age 18 and over, there were 96.6 males.

The median income for a household in the borough was $32,426, and the median income for a family was $37,679. Males had a median income of $29,722 versus $20,909 for females. The per capita income for the borough was $15,608. About 7.5% of families and 11.4% of the population were below the poverty line, including 18.0% of those under age 18 and 10.4% of those age 65 or over.

== Education ==
Pleasantville is a part of the Titusville Area School District
