= Tidioute, Pennsylvania =

Borough in Pennsylvania, US

Tidioute
- Borough
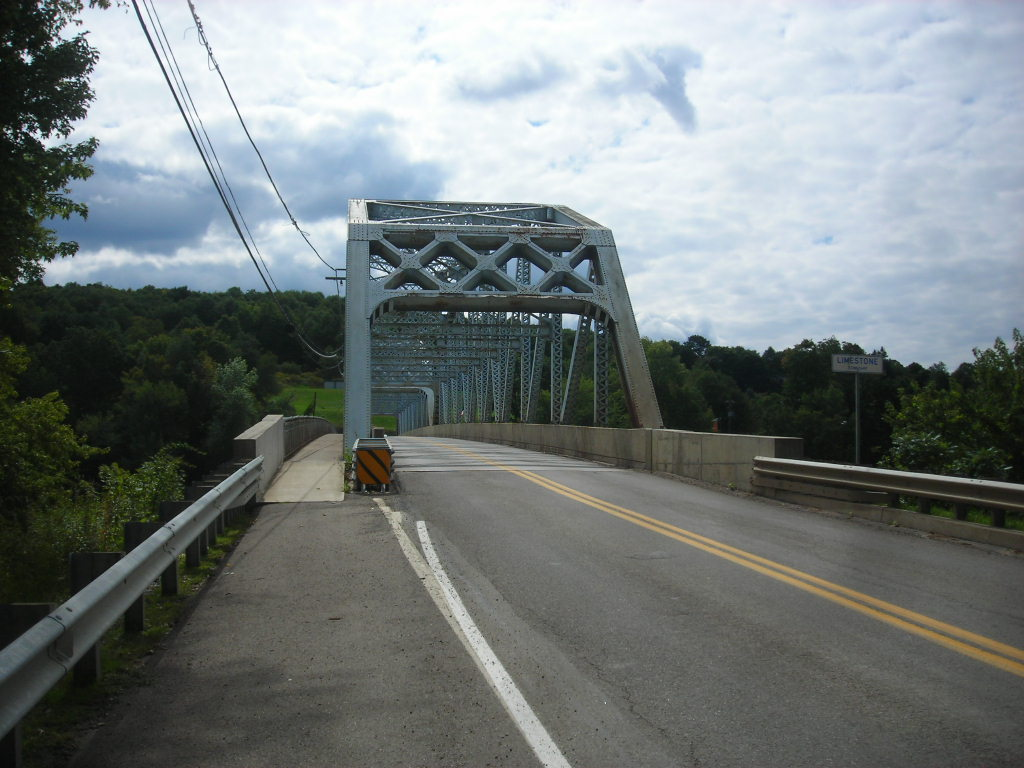
- Tidioute Bridge

- Flag Seal
- Etymology: tidioute, Iroquois for "protrusion of land"
- Location of Tidioute in Warren County, Pennsylvania.

- Location of Tidioute in Pennsylvania
- Coordinates: 41°41′4″N 79°24′14″W
- Country: United States
- State: Pennsylvania
- County: Warren
- Established: 1800

Area
  - Total: 1.20 sq mi (3.12 km^{2})
  - Land: 1.07 sq mi (2.78 km^{2})
  - Water: 0.13 sq mi (0.34 km^{2})

Population (2020)
  - Total: 626
  - Density: 583.4/sq mi (225.26/km^{2})
- Time zone: UTC-5 (EST)
  - Summer (DST): UTC-4 (EDT)
- ZIP code: 16351
- Area code: 814
- FIPS code: 42-76696
- Website: https://www.tidioute.org/

Tidioute is a borough in Warren County, Pennsylvania, United States. As of the 2020 census, Tidioute had a population of 626.

== Etymology ==
The name is an Iroquoian word meaning "protrusion of land", referring to a sharp bend in the Allegheny River.

== Geography ==
Tidioute is located at 41°41′4″N 79°24′14″W (41.684424, -79.403970).

According to the United States Census Bureau, the borough has a total area of 1.4 square miles (3.6 km^{2}), of which 1.1 square miles (2.8 km^{2}) is land and 0.3 square miles (0.78 km^{2}) (20.00%) is water.

== Demographics ==
Historical population
Census	Pop.	Note	%±
1870	1,638		—
1880	1,255		−23.4%
1890	1,328		5.8%
1900	1,237		−6.9%
1910	1,324		7.0%
1920	1,063		−19.7%
1930	970		−8.7%
1940	955		−1.5%
1950	998		4.5%
1960	860		−13.8%
1970	939		9.2%
1980	844		−10.1%
1990	791		−6.3%
2000	792		0.1%
2010	688		−13.1%
2020	626		−9.0%
U.S. Decennial Census

As of the census of 2000, there were 792 people, 314 households, and 221 families residing in the borough. The population density was 707.2 people per square mile (273.1 people/km^{2}). There were 366 housing units at an average density of 326.8 per square mile (126.2/km^{2}). The racial makeup of the borough was 98.99% White, 0.51% African American, 0.13% Asian, and 0.38% from two or more races.

There were 314 households, out of which 28.0% had children under the age of 18 living with them, 55.7% were married couples living together, 9.2% had a female householder with no husband present, and 29.3% were non-families. 26.1% of all households were made up of individuals, and 13.7% had someone living alone who was 65 years of age or older. The average household size was 2.52 and the average family size was 3.00.

Within the borough, the population was spread out, with 24.0% under the age of 18, 6.6% from 18 to 24, 25.3% from 25 to 44, 27.3% from 45 to 64, and 16.9% who were 65 years of age or older. The median age was 41 years. For every 100 females there were 92.2 males. For every 100 females age 18 and over, there were 10000.1 males.

The median income for a household in the borough was $31,058, and the median income for a family was $39,107. Males had a median income of $27,292 versus $18,409 for females. The per capita income for the borough was $15,272. About 7.4% of families and 10.0% of the population were below the poverty line, including 8.9% of those under age 18 and 13.3% of those age 65 or over.

== Recreation ==
Tidioute is a popular summer getaway spot. It is a well known fishing, kayaking and hunting spot. The area has become popular in recent years due to these attractions. Tidioute is home to the Pennsylvania State Championship Fishing Tournament, which is hosted during the last full weekend of September. The main events include the two-day main fishing tournament, a children's fishing derby, parade and carnival.

== Education ==
Tidioute is home to the Tidioute Community Charter School, a pre-K through 12th grade public school located on Main Street. Its current enrollment is 313 students. During the 2013–2014 school year, the school was recognized by U.S. Secretary of Education Arne Duncan as a National Blue Ribbon School. Its website can be found here.

The municipality is in the Warren County School District.
