= Tionesta, Pennsylvania =

Borough in Pennsylvania, US

- Borough
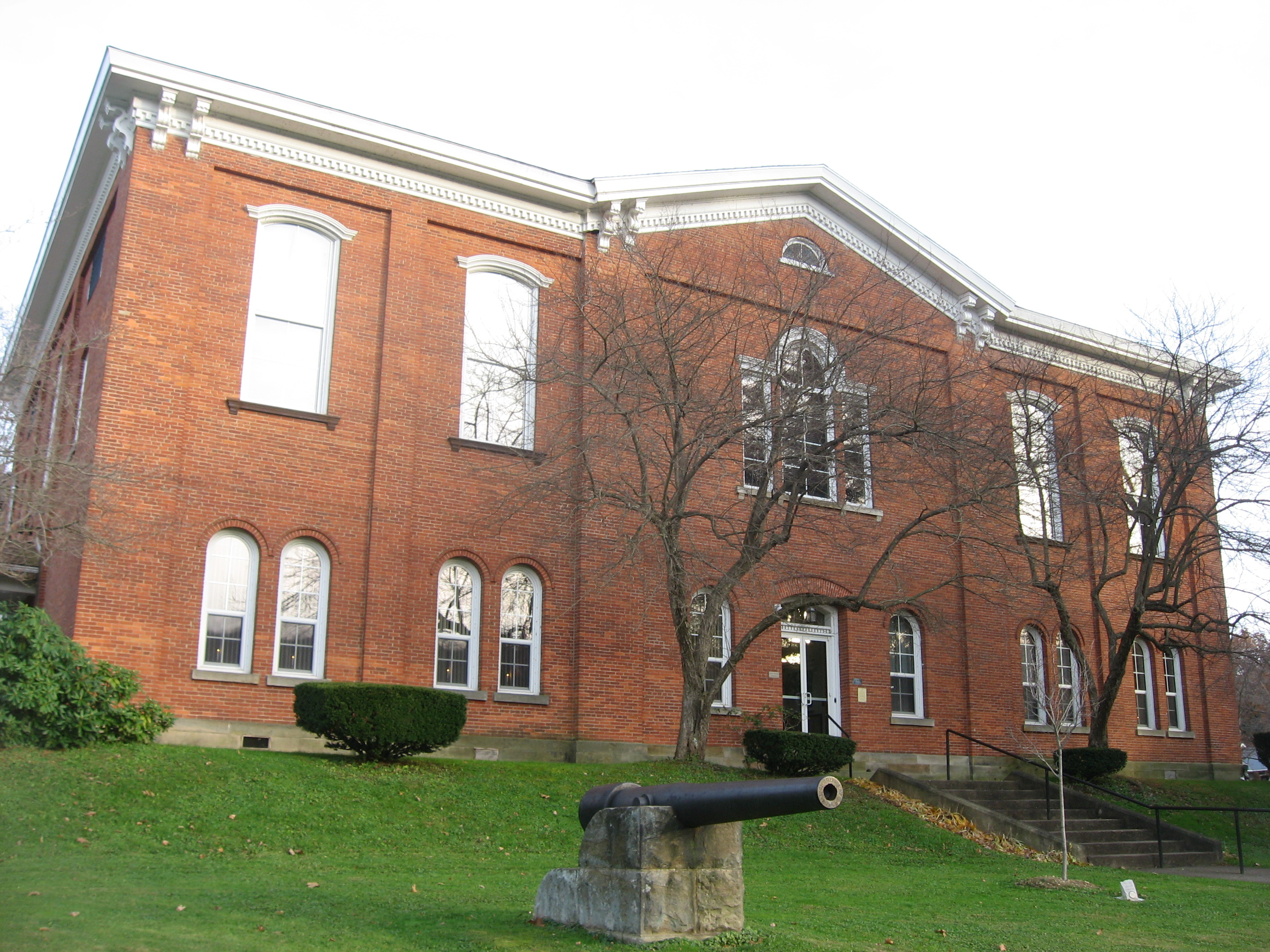
- Forest County Courthouse

- Location of Tionesta in Forest County, Pennsylvania.

- Location within Pennsylvania
- Coordinates: 41°29′42″N 79°27′21″W
- Country: United States
- State: Pennsylvania
- County: Forest
- Settled: 1805
- Incorporated: 1805

Area
  - Total: 1.37 sq mi (3.56 km^{2})
  - Land: 1.37 sq mi (3.56 km^{2})
  - Water: 0 sq mi (0.00 km^{2})

Population (2020)
  - Total: 428
  - Density: 311.3/sq mi (120.21/km^{2})
- Time zone: UTC-5 (Eastern (EST))
  - Summer (DST): UTC-4 (EDT)
- Zip code: 16353
- Area code: 814
- FIPS code: 42-76848
- Website: https://tionestaboro.org/

Tionesta is a borough in and the county seat of Forest County, Pennsylvania, United States. The population was 475 at the 2020 Census.

== Etymology ==
The name is a Native American word meaning "the home of the wolves".

== Geography ==
Tionesta is located at 41°29′42″N 79°27′21″W. The borough is located 54 miles (87 km) southeast of Erie and 78 miles (126 km) north of Pittsburgh.

According to the United States Census Bureau, the borough has a total area of 1.3 square miles (3.4 km^{2}), all land.

=== Climate ===
Climate data for Tionesta 2 SE Lake, Pennsylvania (1991–2020 normals, extremes 1921–present)
Month	Jan	Feb	Mar	Apr	May	Jun	Jul	Aug	Sep	Oct	Nov	Dec	Year
Record high °F (°C)	72 (22)	75 (24)	84 (29)	89 (32)	94 (34)	97 (36)	102 (39)	99 (37)	97 (36)	88 (31)	80 (27)	72 (22)	102 (39)
Mean daily maximum °F (°C)	35.0 (1.7)	37.7 (3.2)	46.9 (8.3)	60.6 (15.9)	71.6 (22.0)	79.2 (26.2)	83.1 (28.4)	81.6 (27.6)	74.9 (23.8)	63.2 (17.3)	50.2 (10.1)	39.2 (4.0)	60.3 (15.7)
Daily mean °F (°C)	27.0 (−2.8)	28.3 (−2.1)	36.3 (2.4)	48.2 (9.0)	59.1 (15.1)	67.9 (19.9)	71.9 (22.2)	70.6 (21.4)	63.9 (17.7)	52.5 (11.4)	41.3 (5.2)	32.1 (0.1)	49.9 (9.9)
Mean daily minimum °F (°C)	19.0 (−7.2)	18.8 (−7.3)	25.8 (−3.4)	35.8 (2.1)	46.6 (8.1)	56.5 (13.6)	60.7 (15.9)	59.6 (15.3)	52.9 (11.6)	41.8 (5.4)	32.4 (0.2)	25.0 (−3.9)	39.6 (4.2)
Record low °F (°C)	−28 (−33)	−27 (−33)	−14 (−26)	−3 (−19)	21 (−6)	29 (−2)	39 (4)	34 (1)	24 (−4)	11 (−12)	0 (−18)	−22 (−30)	−28 (−33)
Average precipitation inches (mm)	3.32 (84)	2.56 (65)	3.48 (88)	4.13 (105)	4.36 (111)	5.14 (131)	4.94 (125)	4.18 (106)	4.03 (102)	3.74 (95)	3.47 (88)	3.71 (94)	47.06 (1,195)
Average snowfall inches (cm)	14.5 (37)	10.4 (26)	7.8 (20)	1.0 (2.5)	0.0 (0.0)	0.0 (0.0)	0.0 (0.0)	0.0 (0.0)	0.0 (0.0)	0.2 (0.51)	3.6 (9.1)	13.3 (34)	50.8 (129)
Average precipitation days (≥ 0.01 in)	19.0	15.3	14.1	15.2	15.4	14.3	13.3	11.6	11.9	15.0	15.6	17.5	178.2
Average snowy days (≥ 0.1 in)	10.1	7.7	4.1	1.1	0.0	0.0	0.0	0.0	0.0	0.1	2.4	7.1	32.6
Source: NOAA

== Demographics ==
Historical population
Census	Pop.	Note	%±
1870	320		—
1880	469		46.6%
1890	677		44.3%
1900	815		20.4%
1910	803		−1.5%
1920	642		−20.0%
1930	670		4.4%
1940	845		26.1%
1950	726		−14.1%
1960	778		7.2%
1970	711		−8.6%
1980	659		−7.3%
1990	634		−3.8%
2000	615		−3.0%
2010	483		−21.5%
2020	428		−11.4%
2021 (est.)	481	▲	12.4%
U.S. Decennial Census

As of the census of 2000, there were 615 people (296 males, 319 females), 282 households, and 166 families residing in the borough. The population density was 457.5 inhabitants per square mile (176.6/km^{2}). There were 337 housing units at an average density of 250.7 per square mile (96.8/km^{2}). The racial makeup of the borough was 99.67% White, 0.16% Asian, and 0.16% from two or more races. Hispanic or Latino of any race were 0.49% of the population.

There were 282 households, out of which 22.0% had children under the age of 18 living with them, 49.6% were married couples living together, 7.1% had a female householder with no husband present, and 41.1% were non-families. 36.9% of all households were made up of individuals, and 24.1% had someone living alone who was 65 years of age or older. The average household size was 2.18 and the average family size was 2.88.

In the borough the population was spread out, with 21.8% under the age of 18, 6.0% from 18 to 24, 21.8% from 25 to 44, 29.4% from 45 to 64, and 21.0% who were 65 years of age or older. The median age was 45 years. For every 100 females there were 92.8 males. For every 100 females age 18 and over, there were 85.7 males.

The median income for a household in the borough was $26,806, and the median income for a family was $40,625. Males had a median income of $31,250 versus $23,889 for females. The per capita income for the borough was $17,799. About 9.2% of families and 14.1% of the population were below the poverty line, including 14.2% of those under age 18 and 12.7% of those age 65 or over.

== Notable people ==
- O. O. Spence, sergeant
- Howard Zahniser, conservationist
