= List of state routes in Pennsylvania =

Pennsylvania State Route System
- State route markers in Pennsylvania

System information
- Notes: All routes are assigned State Route (SR X) numbers, usually corresponding to the signed numbers. State Routes are generally state-maintained.

Highway names
- State: Pennsylvania Route X (PA X)
- Special Routes: Pennsylvania Route X Alternate (PA X Alt.); Pennsylvania Route X Alternate Truck (PA X Alt. Truck); Pennsylvania Route X Business (PA X Bus.); Pennsylvania Route X Bypass (PA X Byp.); Pennsylvania Route X Truck (PA X Truck)
- Quadrant Routes: State Route X (SR X)

System links
- Pennsylvania State Route System; Interstate; US; State; Scenic; Legislative

The Pennsylvania Department of Transportation (PennDOT) is responsible for the establishment and classification of a state highway network which includes Interstate Highways, U.S. Highways, and state routes. U.S. and Interstate highways are classified as state routes in Pennsylvania.

The Commonwealth of Pennsylvania established the Location Referencing System (LRS) in 1987, which registers all numbered routes in Pennsylvania as SR-X. A state route would be SR 39, a US Route would be SR 22, and an Interstate route would be SR 80. However, routes which are numbered between 0000 and 0999 are classified as Traffic Routes, which are abbreviated as PA 39, US 22, and I-80, instead.

There are also four-digit numbers for various "state roads" over which PennDOT has jurisdiction, but those numbers are not displayed on the roads, except in rural areas, where they are posted with index-card-sized small signs. In urban areas, these numbers are somewhat less prominently posted, and these streets are known by the names on the street signs.

== History ==
In 1911, when the Sproul Road Bill was passed, a large number of Legislative Routes (LR) were assigned. These were the primary internal numbering until the present Location Referencing System was adopted in 1987. See also: List of legislative routes in Pennsylvania.

Signed Traffic Route numbers from 1 to 12 were first assigned in 1924 to several of the national auto trails:

Italics denote former routes.

- Pennsylvania Route 1: Lincoln Highway
- Pennsylvania Route 2: Lackawanna Trail
- Pennsylvania Route 3: William Penn Highway
- Pennsylvania Route 4: Susquehanna Trail
- Pennsylvania Route 5: Lakes-to-Sea Highway
- Pennsylvania Route 6: Old Monument Trail (after 1924)
- Pennsylvania Route 7: Roosevelt Highway
- Pennsylvania Route 8: William Flinn Highway (after 1924)
- Pennsylvania Route 9: Yellowstone Trail, Chicago-Buffalo Highway
- Pennsylvania Route 10: Buffalo-Pittsburgh Highway (1927)
- Pennsylvania Route 11: National Pike, National Old Trails Road
- Pennsylvania Route 12: Baltimore Pike
- Pennsylvania Route 13: Chambersburg, Pennsylvania - Philadelphia, Pennsylvania (after 1924)
- Pennsylvania Route 14: York Trail (1927)
- Pennsylvania Route 17: Benjamin Franklin Highway (1927)
- Pennsylvania Route 18: Erie-Lincoln Highway (1927)
- Pennsylvania Route 19: Lewistown - Scranton, Anthracite Trail (after 1924)
- Pennsylvania Route 22: Keystone Trail (1927)
- Pennsylvania Route 24: Washington-Harrisburg Route (after 1924)
- Pennsylvania Route 33: Lykens Valley Trail (1927)
- Pennsylvania Route 41: Reading - Harrisburg (after 1924)
- Pennsylvania Route 44: Highway to the Stars (Potter County)
- Pennsylvania Route 46: Bradford Farmers' Valley Highway (1927)
- Pennsylvania Route 55: Bucktail Trail (1927)
- Pennsylvania Route 64: Horseshoe Trail, Altoona-Bellefonte-Cumberland Trail (1927)
- Pennsylvania Route 66: Anchor Line
- Pennsylvania Route 88: Perry Highway (1927)

Soon more numbers were assigned, including three-digit numbers for branches, like Pennsylvania Route 272 from Pennsylvania Route 72. The United States Numbered Highways were assigned in late 1926, and in 1928 State Routes concurrent with U.S. Routes were removed, while those that conflicted with U.S. Routes were assigned new numbers. In 1946, a mass decommissioning of highways around the state occurred, and many state routes were decommissioned, truncated, or rerouted. The establishment of the Interstate Highway System in 1959, as well as wanting to eliminate some concurrences in Pittsburgh, resulted in a small renumbering in 1961.

Evolution of Pennsylvania state route marker

1926

1948

1960

1962

1966

Since Pennsylvania first introduced numbered traffic routes in 1924, a keystone symbol shape has been used, in reference to Pennsylvania being the "Keystone State". The signs originally said "Penna" (a common abbreviation for Pennsylvania at the time), followed by the route number in block-style numbering in a keystone cutout. In the mid 1950s, the signs were modified to have "PA" instead of "Penna", with the lone exception being the mainline Pennsylvania Turnpike (which continues to use "Penna" today for both the mainline, the Northeast Extension, and the Pennsylvania Turnpike Commission logo); additionally, the numbers were made more round and the signs were made larger in order to be more legible while driving, and the keystone shape itself remained a cutout. By the late 1960s, as U.S. Routes were beginning to be made on rectangular cutouts with the U.S.-style shield painted onto them instead of the shield cutout in most states outside of California, the same was done with the keystone. The state initials were removed altogether and while the numbers remained rounded, they were standardized into FHWA Series E typeface, which was becoming the standard for the Interstate Highway System. Most of the 1950s vintage signs were replaced with the newer rectangular cutout with the painted-on keystone by the early 1970s, though a very few remain in scattered places on non-decommissioned roads. Pennsylvania has used the painted-on keystone signs since.

== List of state routes ==
Number	Length (mi)	Length (km)	Southern or western terminus	Northern or eastern terminus	Formed	Removed	Notes
PA 1	359	578	Hookstown	Morrisville	1924	1930	Replaced by US 30 and US 1.
PA 2	163	262	Philadelphia	Great Bend (New York state line)	1924	1930	Replaced by US 611 (now PA 611 and PA 435), and US 11.
PA 3	—	—	West Virginia	New Jersey	1924	1930	Replaced by US 22, US 422, and US 222.
PA 3	24.326	39.149	US 322 Bus. in West Chester	PA 611 in Philadelphia	1937	current	
PA 4	209	336	Shrewsbury	Lawrenceville	1924	1930	Replaced by US 111, US 15, PA 147, and I-180.
PA 5	—	—	Erie	Philadelphia	1924	1936	Now US 19, PA 99, US 322, PA 53, PA 350, US 220, PA 453, US 22, PA 655, US 322, and PA 3.
PA 5	44.849	72.177	US 20 in Springfield Township, Erie County	NY 5 at New York state line in North East Township	1936	current	
PA 6	249	401	US 219 in Salisbury (Maryland state line)	US 219 in Bradford (New York state line)	1924	1928	Renumbered as PA 60 and a portion of PA 10 to avoid conflict with US 6; now US 219.
PA 7	403	649	Erie	Matamoras	1924	1930	Replaced by US 6.
PA 8	148.60	239.15	I-376 / US 22 / US 30 in Wilkinsburg	US 20 in Erie	1924	current	Section south of Wilkinsburg decommissioned in 1930 and replaced by US 19.
PA 9	45.433	73.117	SR 2 in West Springfield (Ohio state line)	New York state line in North East	1924	1930	Replaced by US 20.
PA 9	111.04	178.70	I-276 / I-476 in Plymouth Meeting	I-81 / US 6 / US 11 in Clarks Summit	1974	1996	Redesignated as I-476.
PA 10	—	—	Blairsville	US 219 in Bradford (New York state line)	1928	1930	Replaced by US 119 and US 219.
PA 10	44.041	70.877	PA 472 in Oxford	US 222 Bus. in Reading	1956	current	Previously the southern portion of US 122; extended from Morgantown to Reading in 1963.
PA 11	82	132	US 40 in West Alexander (West Virginia state line)	US 40 in Addison (Maryland state line)	1924	1928	Renumbered PA 81 to avoid conflict with US 11; now US 40.
PA 12	—	—	Center Valley	Bartonsville	1924	1961	Replaced by PA 378, PA 191, PA 115, and Business US 209. Before 1930, it continued south to Maryland via what is now PA 309 and US 1.
PA 12	9.566	15.395	US 222 / US 422 in Wyomissing	PA 662 in Ruscombanor Township	1998	current	
PA 13	169	272	State Line	Chestnut Hill	1926	1928	Replaced by PA 33, PA 41, and PA 17 to avoid conflict with US 13; now US 11, US 22, and PA 120.
PA 14	53.09	85.44	I-99 / US 15 in Trout Run	NY 14 near Fassett (New York state line)	1928	current	Section south of Harrisburg decommissioned in 1930 and replaced by US 15; south end truncated to US 22 in 1955; section south of Trout Run split off and renumbered PA 147 in 1963 to eliminate a long overlap with US 15.
PA 15	33	53	Montoursville	Swiftwater	1927	1928	Renumbered PA 115 to avoid conflict with US 15.
PA 16	43.136	69.421	US 522 in McConnellsburg	MD 140 in Liberty Township (Maryland state line)	1928	current	
PA 17	35.689	57.436	PA 274 in Blain	US 11 / US 15 in Liverpool	1928	current	Section west of Millerstown decommissioned in 1932 and replaced by US 224, US 422, and US 22; extended to Blain in 1936.
PA 17	6.997	11.261	I-90 in North East	New York state line	1987	1999	Redesignated as I-86.
PA 18	209	336	WV 69 at West Virginia state line in Wayne Township	PA 5 in Lake City	1927	current	Currently the longest state route in Pennsylvania.
PA 19	174	280	Lewistown	Darbytown	1926	1928	Renumbered PA 39 to avoid conflict with US 19; now US 522, US 11, US 6, and PA 652.
PA 21	50.751	81.676	WV 891 at West Virginia state line in Richhill Township	US 40 Bus. in Uniontown	1927	current	
PA 22	60	97	Allentown	Wilkes-Barre	1927	1928	Renumbered PA 29 to avoid conflict with US 22; now PA 309.
PA 23	81.144	130.589	PA 441 in Marietta	US 1 in Philadelphia	1928	current	
PA 24	28.352	45.628	MD 23 at Maryland state line Stewartstown	PA 921 in Mount Wolf	1926	current	Section north of Red Lion replaced by PA 74 (overlap removed), PA 181, PA 382, and an extended PA 114 in 1961.
PA 25	34.975	56.287	US 209 in Millersburg	US 209 in Newtown	1928	current	
PA 26	128	206	Maryland state line in Union Township	PA 150 in Howard	1928	current	Extended north to Bellefonte in 1963, and to its current end in 1970.
PA 27	65.7	105.7	Park Avenue in Meadville	PA 69 in Sugar Grove	1928	current	
PA 28	98.10	157.88	Anderson Street in Pittsburgh's North Shore neighborhood	US 219 in Brockway	1927	current	Section west of Pittsburgh renumbered PA 50 in 1960.
PA 29	118.239	190.287	South: US 30 in Malvern; North: I-81 in Ashley	South: I-78 / PA 309 in Allentown; North: NY 7 at New York state line in Liberty Township	1928	current	Sections connected until 1966, when the middle section was replaced by US 309 (overlap removed), the new PA 873, an extended PA 93, and an extended PA 239; section south of US 30 decommissioned in 1930 and replaced by US 122 (now US 202).
PA 31	74.74	120.28	PA 136 in South Huntingdon Township	US 30 in Napier Township	1927	current	Sections west of South Huntingdon Township renumbered in 1964 to avoid multiple intersections with I-70; replaced by PA 136 and PA 844.
PA 32	40.605	65.347	US 1 in Morrisville	PA 611 near Upper Black Eddy	1927	current	Section from Morrisville to Philadelphia decommissioned in 1930 and replaced by US 13.
PA 33	—	—	Carlisle	Mecks Corner	1926	1936	Became part of an extended PA 34; section from Mecks Corner to Milford decommissioned in 1930 and replaced by PA 5 (now PA 274) and US 209 (part now PA 147; section south of Shippensburg decommissioned in 1930 and replaced by US 11.
PA 33	—	—	US 11 in Shippensburg	US 11 in Carlisle	1937	1941	Became part of rerouted US 11.
PA 33	—	—	Shippensburg	Carlisle	1941	1963	Former section of US 11; now PA 174 and PA 465.
PA 33	27.738	44.640	I-78 in Lower Saucon Township	PA 611 in Stroud Township	1972	current	
PA 34	62.289	100.244	US 15 Bus. in Gettysburg	US 11 / US 15 near Liverpool	1928	current	Section south of Gettysburg decommissioned in 1930 and replaced by US 15.
PA 35	70.4	113.3	US 522 near Shade Gap	US 11 / US 15 in Selinsgrove	1928	current	
PA 36	151.10	243.17	PA 26 in Hopewell Township	PA 27 / PA 227 in Pleasantville	1928	current	
PA 37	8	13	Lackawaxen	Greeley	1928	1946	Cancelled and reassigned to route below, replacing PA 137; now PA 590 and PA 434.
PA 37	8	13	New York state line at Shohola	Greeley	1946	1967	Now PA 434.
PA 38	40.2	64.7	US 422 / PA 68 in Summit Township	US 322 in Rockland Township	1928	current	
PA 39	—	—	Lewistown	Darbytown	1928	1930	Now US 522, US 11, US 6, and PA 652.
PA 39	17.829	28.693	North Front Street (SR 3009) in Susquehanna Township	US 322 / US 422 in Derry Township	1937	current	
PA 41	22.220	35.760	DE 41 at Delaware state line in Kennett Township	US 30 in Gap	1926	current	Section from Gap to Lampeter decommissioned in 1932 and replaced by PA 741; section from Lampeter to Carlisle decommissioned in 1930 and replaced by US 222, US 230 (now PA 230), and US 11.
PA 42	58.6	94.3	PA 61 in Centralia	US 220 in Laporte	1927	current	Section from Centralia to Reading decommissioned in 1930 as it overlapped US 120, splitting the route into two sections; section from Reading to Oxford became part of US 122 (PA 10) in 1935; southern section from Oxford to Chrome decommissioned in 1946.
PA 43	—	—	Allentown	Bethlehem	1928	1946	Section from Allentown to Harrisburg decommissioned in 1930 and replaced by US 22.
PA 43	—	—	King of Prussia	Philadelphia	1952	1964	Replaced by I-76.
PA 43	55.2	88.8	WV 43 in Springhill Township (West Virginia state line)	PA 51 in Jefferson Hills	1993	current	Known as the Mon–Fayette Expressway.
PA 44	149.24	240.18	I-80 / PA 42 in Buckhorn	NY 417 in Ceres Township (New York state line)	1927	current	In 1936, extended south from Jersey Shore to Turbotville; in 1941, extended southeast to Mahanoy City. Truncated to its current southern terminus in 1964; former southern segment by PA 42 (overlap removed), US 11 (overlap removed), and an extended PA 339.
PA 45	86	138	PA 453 in Water Street	PA 642 in Mooresburg	1928	current	Section from Water Street to Belsano decommissioned 1961; this section now US 22 and PA 271; section east of Mooresburg decommissioned in 1966 and replaced by PA 642 (overlap removed), an extended PA 54, US 209 (overlap removed), and new PA 248.
PA 46	43.0	69.2	PA 120 in Emporium	US 219 / PA 346 in Bradford	1927	current	
PA 46	—	—	PA 53 in Osceola	PA 350 Sandy Ridge	1932	1946	Partially replaced by PA 970.
PA 47	21	34	Kingsley	Carbondale	1927	1930	Replaced by US 106; now PA 106; segment from Meadville to Pittsfield Township section replaced by PA 27 in 1928; segment from Emporium to Smethport replaced by PA 46 in 1928.
PA 48	18.9	30.4	PA 51 in Forward Township	US 22 Bus. in Monroeville	1928	current	
PA 49	52.6	84.7	PA 44 in Coudersport	PA 287 in Lawrenceville	1928	current	
PA 50	—	—	Mill Hall	Bellefonte	1928	1930	Replaced by US 220; now PA 64 and PA 550.
PA 50	32.7	52.6	PA 844 in Independence Township	PA 60 in Pittsburgh's Crafton Heights neighborhood	1960	current	
PA 51	89	143	US 40 Bus. in Uniontown	SR 14 at the Ohio state line in Darlington Township	1928	current	
PA 52	12	19	DE 52 at Delaware state line in Pennsbury Township	US 322 Bus. in West Chester	1928	current	Section east of West Chester decommissioned in 1930 and replaced by US 122 (now US 202).
PA 53	83.0	133.6	US 219 in Summerhill	PA 144 in Snow Shoe	1928	current	Section from Snow Shoe Township to Potters Mills became part of an extended PA 144 in 1967; section south of Summerhill decommissioned in 1970 and is now PA 403, PA 281, and PA 523; section from Potters Mills to Reedsville became part of US 322 in 1932.
PA 54	81.4	131.0	US 15 near Montgomery	US 209 in Nesquehoning	1928	current	In 1936, section from Jersey Shore to Turbotville became part of an extended PA 44 and route was relocated to current west end; east end truncated from Ashland to Danville in the 1960s; overlap with PA 45 from Danville to Mt. Carmel removed; extended east from Danville to Nesquehoning in 1966, replacing part of PA 45
PA 55	80	130	Ridgway	Near Hyner	1927	1930	Replaced by US 120; now PA 120; section from Ohio state line at Sharon to Franklin renumbred PA 65 (now US 62) in 1928.
PA 56	108	174	Eastern end of the C.L. Schmitt Bridge in New Kensington	US 30 in Bedford Township	1928	current	
PA 57	14	23	Oil City	Fryburg	1927	1932	Now US 62 and PA 157.
PA 58	71.2	114.6	SR 5 at the Ohio state line in Greene Township	PA 68 in Sligo	1927	current	
PA 59	39.03	62.81	US 6 in Warren	US 6 in Smethport	1928	current	
PA 60	—	—	US 219 in Salisbury (Maryland state line)	US 119 in DuBois	1928	1930	Now US 219.
PA 60	9.4	15.1	US 19 / PA 51 / PA 837 in Pittsburgh's West End neighborhood	I-376 / US 22 / US 30 in Robinson Township	1956	current	Most of former route converted to I-376 in 2009; northernmost segment into Sharon became PA 760.
PA 61	—	—	Concordville	Chester	1928	1936	Now US 322.
PA 61	81.801	131.646	US 222 Bus. in Reading	US 11 / US 15 / PA 147 in Shamokin Dam	1963	current	Previously the western portion of US 122.
PA 62	67	108	Delaware state line at Chadds Ford	Pleasant Corners	1927	1932	Renumbered PA 100 to avoid conflict with US 62.
PA 63	37.417	60.217	PA 29 in Green Lane	I-95 in Bensalem Township	1928	current	
PA 64	—	—	US 220 in Milesburg	US 120 (now PA 120) near Lock Haven	1927	1946	Mostly replaced by US 220 (now PA 150); sections north of Lock Haven and south of Milesburg decommissioned in 1930 and replaced by US 220.
PA 64	21	34	PA 26 in Spring Township	PA 150 in Mill Hall	1946	current	Formerly a section of US 220.
PA 65	—	—	Ohio state line	Franklin	1928	1932	Now US 62.
PA 65	51	82	I-279 /US 19 Truck in Pittsburgh's North Shore neighborhood	PA 108 /PA 168 in New Castle	1960	current	
PA 66	139	224	US 119 in New Stanton	US 6 in Kane	1927	current	Section from Shippenville to Tionesta became part of PA 208 in 1968 and route was rerouted north to Kane; section north of Tionesta decommissioned in 1932 and replaced by US 62; section south of New Stanton decommissioned in 1930 and replaced by US 119
PA 67	33	53	Wyalusing	Milford	1927	1930	Replaced by US 106; now PA 706; Meadville to Riceville section became part of PA 77 in 1928.
PA 68	90.036	144.899	SR 39 at Ohio state line in Ohioville	US 322 in Clarion	1927	current	Extended north from Kane to Kinzua in 1935, but this section was decommissioned in 1962; section from Kane to Clarion replaced by PA 66 in 1968
PA 69	14.313	23.035	US 62 in Conewango Township	CR 69 at New York state line in Sugar Grove Township	1928	current	
PA 70	37	60	US 119/U.S. 106 in Carbondale	New York state line north of Hallsted	1928	1961	Now PA 171.
PA 71	40	64	US 40 in North Bethlehem Township	US 30 in Greensburg	1928	1964	Now PA 917, I-70, PA 201 and PA 136.
PA 72	37.757	60.764	US 222 /PA 272 in Lancaster	PA 443 in Union Township	1927	current	Section south of Lancaster decommissioned in 1930 and replaced by US 222; extended to Goshen in 1936, but this section became part of PA 272 in 1965.
PA 72	—	—	US 11 in Wilkes-Barre	US 309 in Wilkes-Barre	1928	1946	
PA 73	62.319	100.293	PA 61 near Leesport	NJ 73 at New Jersey state line in Philadelphia	1928	current	Section from Goodville to Mount Penn renumbered PA 625 in 1962; rerouted to end in Leesport rather than Mount Penn in 1964.
PA 74	96	154	MD 165 at Maryland state line near Delta	PA 75 near Port Royal	1927	current	
PA 75	71.249	114.664	MD 494 at Maryland state line in Montgomery Township	US 22 / US 322 in Port Royal	1928	current	Extended south from Fort Loudon in 1937.
PA 76	61.5	99.0	Blairsville	DuBois	1927	1928	Renumbered as part of PA 10; now US 119.
PA 76	80	130	Warfordsburg	Reedsville	1928	1964	Now PA 655.
PA 77	35.616	57.318	PA 27 in Meadville	PA 426 in Corry	1928	current	
PA 78	55	89	Brady Township	Richmond Township	1928	1961	Now PA 173 and PA 198.
PA 79	8	13	Concord Township	Union City	1928	1961	Renumbered PA 178, but that was decommissioned in 1983; section west of Union City was redesignated as US 6N in 1935.
PA 80	96	154	US 22 near Monroeville	US 219 in Burnside Township	1928	1961	Now PA 286; section from Monroeville to Pittsburgh replaced by US 22 (overlap removed; now PA 8) and an extended PA 380 in 1960.
PA 81	82.0	132.0	West Virginia state line near West Alexander	Maryland state line near Addison	1928	1930	Now US 40.
PA 82	31.630	50.904	DE 82 at Delaware state line near Kennett Square	PA 23 in Elverson	1928	current	Former segment north of Elverson decommissioned in 2008 due to storm damage; some of the route was added to an extended PA 345.
PA 83	71	114	Devon	Schuylkill Haven	1928	1961	Now PA 183, PA 724, PA 23, and PA 252.
PA 84	68	109	Larrys Creek	Tioga	1928	1961	Now PA 287 and PA 328.
PA 85	24.563	39.530	PA 28 / PA 66 near Kittanning	US 119 in Home	1928	current	
PA 86	12.440	20.020	PA 27 in Meadville	US 6 / US 19 / PA 408 in Cambridge Springs	1936	current	Officially designated as PA 886, due to Interstate 86.
PA 87	69.533	111.903	I-180 / US 220 in Montoursville	US 6 in Washington Township	1928	current	
PA 88	68.244	109.828	US 119 in Point Marion	PA 51 in Pittsburgh's Overbrook neighborhood	1927	current	Section north of Pittsburgh replaced by US 19 in 1930; extended north to Rochester in 1935, and to New Castle in 1937; segment north of Pittsburgh was renumbered PA 65 in 1960.
PA 89	47.86	77.02	PA 8 / PA 27 in Titusville	PA 5 near North East	1928	current	
PA 90	110	180	Easton	New York state line at Hancock, New York	1928	1961	Now PA 191 and PA 115.
PA 91	—	—	Delaware state line	Philadelphia	1928	1930	Replaced by US 13.
PA 91	11	18	Honesdale	Damascus Township	1936	1946	
PA 92	66.7	107.3	US 11 in West Pittston	NY 79 in Oakland Township (New York state line)	1928	current	In 1946, segment from Tunkhannock to Forty Fort was replaced by US 309 (now PA 29 and PA 309); route was extended south to West Pittston on a former segment of US 309.
PA 93	41.086	66.122	US 209 near Nesquehoning	PA 487 in Orangeville	1928	current	Extended southeast from PA 239 to Nesquehoning in 1966, replacing part of PA 29.
PA 94	30.738	49.468	MD 30 in West Manheim Township (Maryland state line)	PA 34 in Mount Holly Springs	1928	current	
PA 95	45	72	Centre Hall	Lewisburg	1928	1961	Now PA 192.
PA 96	42	68	MD 35 in Londonderry Township (Maryland state line)	PA 869 in Lincoln Township	1928	current	
PA 97	—	—	US 6N (now PA 97) in Waterford	US 19 (now PA 99) in Kearsarge	1928	1935	Replaced by rerouted US 19.
PA 97	20.14	32.41	PA 8 in Union City	PA 8 in Erie	1935	current	Officially designated as PA 197, due to PA 97 in Adams County; formerly segments of US 6N and US 6.
PA 97	9.363	15.068	MD 97 near Littlestown (Maryland state line)	US 15 near Gettysburg	1979	current	Formerly a segment of US 140.
PA 98	31.0	49.9	US 6 / US 19 / US 322 in Vernon Township	PA 5 in Avonia	1928	current	
PA 99	—	—	US 20 in Springfield Township, Erie County	NY 5 at New York state line in North East Township	1928	1936	Now PA 5.
PA 99	21.04	33.86	US 6 / US 19 in Cambridge Springs	US 19 near Erie	1936	current	Officially designated as PA 699, due to Interstate 99.
PA 100	59.409	95.610	US 202 near West Chester	PA 309 in Pleasant Corners	1932	current	Formerly PA 62.
PA 101	5	8.0	US 13 in Bristol	US 1 in South Langhorne	1928	1946	Became a segment of PA 413.
PA 102	—	—	Easton	Stockertown	1928	1936	Became a segment of PA 115.
PA 102	—	—	US 6 / US 19 / US 322 near Meadville	PA 98 in Vernon Township	1941	1955	Became a segment of PA 98.
PA 102	4.3	6.9	US 6 / US 19 / US 322 near Meadville	PA 98 in Vernon Township	1955	current	
PA 103	30.8	49.6	US 522 near Mount Union	Bus. US 22 in Lewistown	1932	current	
PA 104	22.92	36.89	US 11 / US 15 near Liverpool	PA 45 in Mifflinburg	1928	current	
PA 105	2	3.2	PA 3 in Bon Air	US 30 in Ardmore Park	1928	1946	
PA 106	20.685	33.289	US 11 in Kingsley	Bus. US 6 in Carbondale	1972	current	Formerly US 106.
PA 107	17.271	27.795	US 6 / US 11 in Factoryville	US 6 in Mayfield	1928	current	
PA 108	31.6	50.9	Ohio state line in North Beaver Township	PA 8 in Slippery Rock Township	1928	current	Extended southwest from New Castle in 1937.
PA 110	5.71	9.19	PA 954 in Creekside	US 119 near Ernest	1928	current	
PA 112	5	8.0	US 1 in Markham	PA 926 in Tanguy	1928	1946	
PA 113	46.915	75.502	Bus. US 30 in Downingtown	PA 611 in Tinicum Township	1928	current	In 1946, the segment southeast of PA 313 southeast was decommissioned; while the route was extended to the north to connect to PA 611.
PA 114	19.372	31.176	PA 944 in Wertzville	SR 1003 near New Market	1928	current	
PA 115	35.652	57.376	US 209 in Brodheadsville	I-81 / PA 309 near Wilkes-Barre	1928	current	Rerouted south from Blakeslee in 1935; the old route east to Swiftwater became part of PA 940; western portion of original route split off as PA 118 in 1961; section from Brodheadsville to Easton decommissioned in 1972.
PA 116	39.799	64.050	PA 16 in Carroll Valley	US 30 in West Manchester Township	1928	current	
PA 117	12.586	20.255	US 322 / PA 72 in Cornwall	US 422 in Palmyra	1928	current	North terminus relocated from Campbellton to Palmyra in 1946.
PA 118	—	—	PA 168 in Hookstown	PA 18 in Shippingport	1928	1946	In 1951, part of this route was restored as a rerouting of PA 168.
PA 118	42.248	67.992	PA 405 in Hughesville	PA 415 near Dallas	1961	current	Previously the western portion of PA 115.
PA 120	103.886	167.188	US 219 / PA 948 in Ridgway	US 220 near Lock Haven	1967	current	Formerly US 120.
PA 121	—	—	Maryland border	PA 21 near Waynesburg	1928	1950	
PA 121	4	6.4	US 19 in Mt. Lebanon	PA 50 on the border of Greentree and Pittsburgh's Westwood neighborhood	1961	current	
PA 123	4	6.4	PA 23 in Gulph	US 202 in Bridgeport	1928	1946	In 1967, restored as segments of PA 23 and PA 320.
PA 124	12.790	20.584	East Prospect Street in York	PA 425 / PA 624 in Lower Windsor Township	1928	current	South terminus was originally in Airville; sections became part of PA 324 in 1936; extended to Fawn Grove in 1937; Segment in Lancaster County decommissioned in 1941; the former southern segment was renumbered PA 425 in 1966.
PA 125	—	—	PA 25 in Hegins	US 209 near Swatara	1928	1936	Became a segment of PA 25.5
PA 125	32.045	51.571	PA 443 in Pine Grove	PA 61 near Shamokin	1936	current	Formerly segments of PA 25 and PA 325.
PA 126	23	37	Maryland state line near Warfordsburg	US 30 in Breezewood	1928	1964	Now I-70; before the freeway was built, the route included a segment of what is now PA 484.
PA 127	10.01	16.11	US 62 in West Hickory	US 62 in Tidioute	1928	current	
PA 128	15.746	25.341	PA 356 in Freeport	PA 66 in Ford City	1928	current	
PA 129	5	8.0	US 202 in Markham	PA 352 in Gradyville	1928	1946	
PA 130	49.1	79.0	PA 8 in Pittsburgh's Highland Park neighborhood	PA 381 in Cook Township	1961	current	
PA 131	3	4.8	PA 31 in New Buena Vista	US 30 near Schellsburg	1928	1946	
PA 132	15.155	24.390	PA 611 near Warrington	I-95 in Bensalem	1928	current	
PA 133	2	3.2	US 209 in Port Carbon	US 122 in Saint Clair	1928	1946	
PA 134	7.463	12.011	Maryland state line near Barlow	Bus. US 15 in Gettysburg	1928	current	
PA 135	7	11	US 22 / US 322 in Thompsontown	PA 35 in Cocolamus	1928	1946	Became a segment of PA 333 in 1965.
PA 136	—	—	PA 36 near Chest Springs	PA 53 in Fallentimber	1928	1946	
PA 136	44.8	72.1	US 40 / PA 18 in Washington	US 30 in Greensburg	1964	current	Previously a segment of PA 31.
PA 137	5	8.0	PA 37 in Greeley	New York state line at Shohola	1928	1946	
PA 138	10.618	17.088	PA 8 in West Liberty	PA 38 in North Washington	1928	current	
PA 139	8	13	PA 29 in Silkworth	US 11 in West Nanticoke	1928	1946	Became a segment of PA 29.
PA 141	8	13	PA 441 in Marietta	PA 230 in Mount Joy	1928	1984	Became a segment of PA 772.
PA 142	8	13	US 122 in Frackville	PA 44 in Zions Grove	1928	1946	Southern section now a segment of PA 924.
PA 143	20.039	32.250	PA 662 in Richmond Township	PA 309 in New Tripoli	1928	current	Extended from Lenhartsville to Richmond Township in 1962.
PA 144	109.3	175.9	US 322 in Potter Township	US 6 in Galeton	1928	current	
PA 145	20.887	33.614	PA 309 in Upper Saucon Township	PA 248 in Weiders Crossing	1928	current	
PA 146	10.144	16.325	US 6 in Hamlin Township	PA 46 in Norwich Township	1928	current	
PA 147	—	—	PA 247 in Montdale	PA 247 in Dundaff	1928	1946	Became segments of PA 247 and PA 438.
PA 147	58.346	93.899	US 22 / US 322 in Reed Township	I-80 / I-180 in Turbot Township	1963	current	Formerly a segment of PA 14.
PA 148	6.5	10.5	PA 48/Lincoln Way in McKeesport	US 30 in East McKeesport	1928	1946	Became a segment of part of PA 48.
PA 148	6.5	10.5	PA 48 in McKeesport	US 30 in East McKeesport	1946	current	
PA 149	4	6.4	PA 49 in Knoxville	New York state line north of Knoxville	1928	1946	Became a segment of PA 249.
PA 150	—	—	PA 64 in Howard	US 220 in Hublersburg	1928	1946	Replaced by a segment of PA 445.
PA 150	41.1	66.1	PA 26 in College Township	US 220 in Avis	1973	current	
PA 151	13.322	21.440	US 30 in Greene Township	PA 51 on the border of Hopewell Township and South Heights	1928	current	
PA 152	25.317	40.744	PA 309 in Cheltenham Township	PA 309 near Telford	1928	current	
PA 153	48.7	78.4	PA 253 / PA 453 in Gulich Township, Clearfield County near Viola	US 219 in Horton Township, Elk County near Brockport	1928	current	Segment from Bigler to PA 53 decommissioned in 1968 and overlap with US 322 from Bigler to Clearfield removed; extended south to PA 879 in 1970, to Houtsdale in 1971, and to Gulich Township in 1995.
PA 154	31.498	50.691	US 220 in Laporte	PA 414 in Canton	1928	current	Originally went from Milton to Jerseytown; section from Mausdale to Jerseytown became part of PA 115; a second section was added along the former routing of PA 115; in 1946, the southern section from Milton to Mausdale became part of PA 115.
PA 155	32.2	51.8	PA 120 in Emporium	PA 446 in Eldred Township	1928	current	
PA 156	16.386	26.371	PA 981 near Avonmore	US 422 / PA 56 in Shelocta	1928	current	
PA 157	13.6	21.9	US 62 near Seneca	PA 66 (now PA 36) in Tionesta	1930	1935	Became part of rerouted US 62.
PA 157	13.6	21.9	US 62 near Seneca	PA 208 in Fryburg	1935	current	Originally extended from US 62 to Tionesta; swapped with US 62 in 1935.
PA 158	11.864	19.093	PA 18 near New Wilmington	US 62 / PA 258 in Mercer	1928	current	
PA 159	10	16	PA 59 in Cornplanter	New York state line in Corydon	1928	1946	Much of this route is now under the Allegheny Reservoir.
PA 160	69.7	112.2	MD 47 at Maryland state line in Wellersburg	West High Street in Ebensburg	1928	current	
PA 161	4	6.4	PA 452 in Linwood	US 322 in Chelsea	1928	1954	
PA 162	10.1	16.3	PA 82 / PA 842 in Unionville	Bus. US 322 in West Chester	1928	current	
PA 163	—	—	PA 73 in Philadelphia	PA 63 in Bethayres	1928	1936	Became part of an extended PA 232.
PA 163	—	—	PA 63 near Willow Grove	PA 63 in Bethayres	1936	1946	
PA 163	2.384	3.837	MD 63 at Maryland state line in Antrim Township	US 11 in Antrim Township	1963	current	
PA 164	36.4	58.6	US 22 in Munster Township	PA 26 near Raystown Lake	1928	current	
PA 166	21.9	35.2	US 119 in Springhill Township	US 40 in Redstone Township	1928	current	
PA 167	28.7	46.2	US 11 in Hop Bottom	New York state line near Brackney	1928	current	
PA 168	55.3	89.0	PA 18 in Frankfort Springs	PA 208 in Volant	1928	current	Extended north from PA 68 to Leesburg in 1937; segment from Leesburg to Volant became part of rerouted PA 208.
PA 170	11.629	18.715	US 6 in Prompton	PA 670 in Mount Pleasant Township	1928	current	
PA 171	—	—	PA 71 (now PA 201) in Rostraver Township	PA 51 in Rostraver	1928	1946	
PA 171	40.170	64.647	Bus. US 6 in Carbondale	US 11 in Great Bend	1961	current	Formerly PA 70.
PA 172	10	16	US 222 near Wrightsdale	US 222 in Unicorn	1928	1946	
PA 173	45.7	73.5	PA 8 near Slippery Rock	PA 27 near Cochranton	1961	current	Formerly PA 78.
PA 174	28.088	45.203	US 11 / PA 533 in Shippensburg	PA 641 in Monroe Township	1929	current	Extended west from Boiling Springs in 1937.
PA 174	2	3.2	Near Allenwood	US 15 in Allenwood	1929	1936	This route was also designated as PA 974.
PA 176	20	32	US 522 near Fort Littleton	US 522 in Orbisonia	1928	1964	Became PA 475.
PA 177	—	—	US 6 in Corry	PA 77 in Spring Creek	1928	1946	Became part of PA 426.
PA 177	9.569	15.400	PA 74 in Fairview Township	PA 262 in Rossville	1961	current	
PA 178	8	13	US 6 / PA 8 in Union City	PA 89 in Concord Corners	1961	1983	Formerly PA 79.
PA 179	—	—	Ohio state line near Conneaut, Ohio	US 6N in Tracy	1928	1961	Now PA 226.
PA 179	1.213	1.952	US 202 in Solebury Township	New Jersey state line at New Hope	1975	current	
PA 180	44.4	71.5	PA 380 in Penn Hills	PA 381 in Cook Township	1928	1961	Now PA 130.
PA 181	—	—	Maryland state line	US 40 in Somerfield	1928	1946	
PA 181	9.089	14.627	Bus. I-83 / US 30 in North York	PA 382 in York Haven	1961	current	
PA 182	—	—	US 122 (now PA 10) in Cochranville	PA 82 in Ercildoun	1928	1946	
PA 182	6.671	10.736	PA 462 in West Manchester Township	PA 74 in Spry	1961	current	
PA 183	—	—	PA 83 near Linfield	PA 683 in Royersford	1928	1946	
PA 183	31.681	50.986	Bus. US 422 in Reading	PA 61 near Schuylkill Haven	1928	current	
PA 184	9.684	15.585	PA 287 in Brookside	I-99 / US 15 in Cogan House Township	1928	current	
PA 185	9	14	US 422 in Coyleville	PA 356 in Butler	1935	1946	
PA 186	4	6.4	Penn Hills	Turtle Creek	1936	1941	Now a segment of PA 130.
PA 187	43.1	69.4	PA 87 in Lovelton	New York in Windham Township	1928	current	
PA 188	9.747	15.686	US 19 / PA 21 in Morrisville	PA 88 in Dry Tavern	1928	current	
PA 189	5	8.0	US 6 in Corry	New York state line near Wheelock	1930	1946	Now a segment of PA 426.
PA 190	2	3.2	PA 90 in East Stroudsburg	US 209 near North Stroudsburg	1928	1946	Restored as part of PA 196 in 1956; now part of PA 447.
PA 191	—	—	PA 291 (now Passyunk Avenue) in Philadelphia	Baltimore Pike in Aldan	1928	1951	Partially replaced by rerouted PA 291.
PA 191	111.54	179.51	US 22 in Brodhead	New York state line near Hancock, NY	1961	current	Formerly PA 90.
PA 192	—	—	PA 415	PA 92 in Bowman Creek	1928	1936	Replaced by rerouted PA 29 which in turn was redesignated as PA 309.
PA 192	45.4	73.1	PA 144 in Centre Hall	US 15 in Lewisburg	1961	current	Formerly PA 95.
PA 193	2	3.2	Weatherly	US 309 in Hudsondale	1929	1946	
PA 194	31.974	51.457	MD 194 at Maryland state line near Kingsdale	PA 74 in Dillsburg	1928	current	
PA 196	25.736	41.418	PA 611 / PA 940 in Mount Pocono	PA 296 in Varden	1936	current	
PA 198	38.8	62.4	SR 167 at the Ohio state line in Beaver Township	PA 27 in Randolph Township	1928	current	
PA 199	—	—	US 20 in Asbury	PA 5 near Asbury	1928	1964	
PA 199	4.98	8.01	US 220 in Athens Township	I-86 / NY 17 / NY 34 at New York state line in Sayre	1974	current	
PA 201	—	—	US 1/US 13 in Philadelphia	US 30 in Bryn Mawr	1928	1946	
PA 201	25.2	40.6	US 119 / PA 711 / PA 711 Truck in Connellsville	PA 136 in Rostraver Township	1964	current	
PA 202	5	8.0	PA 12 in Wind Gap	US 611 in Bangor	1928	1935	Renumbered PA 702 to avoid conflict with US 202.
PA 203	15	24	US 164 in Clover Creek	US 22 near Point View	1928	1946	Partially replaced by PA 866.
PA 204	9.69	15.59	US 522 in Selinsgrove	US 304 in New Berlin	1928	current	
PA 205	2	3.2	US 322 in Little Washington	PA 282 in Lyndell	1928	1946	
PA 207	3	4.8	US 11 in Scranton	PA 347 in Throop	1928	1946	
PA 208	75	121	US 422 in Pulaski Township, near the Ohio state line	PA 36 in Washington Township	1928	current	
PA 210	29.8	48.0	PA 56 / PA 156 in South Bend Township	US 119 near Covode	1928	current	
PA 212	14.918	24.008	PA 313 in Quakertown	PA 611 in Durham Township	1928	current	
PA 213	6.948	11.182	PA 532 in Feasterville	Bus. US 1 near Fairless Hills	1928	current	
PA 214	—	—	PA 641 in Mechanicsburg	US 13 near Camp Hill	1928	1946	
PA 214	11.289	18.168	PA 616 in Seven Valleys	PA 74 in Dallastown	1961	current	
PA 215	—	—	PA 940 in Locust Lake Village	US 11 in Hughestown	1928	1946	
PA 215	7.9	12.7	US 6N near Albion	PA 5 in Springfield Township	1962	current	
PA 216	25.96	41.78	PA 116 near Hanover	PA 24 in Winterstown	1928	current	
PA 217	21.543	34.670	US 30 in Unity Township	PA 286 in Black Lick Township	1961	current	
PA 218	—	—	PA 18 in New Wilmington	PA 18 near Middlesex	1928	1929	Now segments of PA 208 and PA 551.
PA 218	13.460	21.662	WV 218 at the West Virginia state line in Wayne Township	US 19 / PA 21 in Waynesburg	1936	current	
PA 221	—	—	PA 121	PA 88 near Point Marion	1928	1946	
PA 221	31	50	PA 188 in Morgan Township	PA 231 in Blaine Township	1936	current	
PA 222	4.482	7.213	I-78 / US 222 / PA 309 in Dorneyville	PA 145 in Allentown	1991	current	
PA 223	—	—	PA 23 in Valley Forge	PA 23 near Valley Forge	1936	1941	
PA 223	23	37	US 422 in Strongstown	US 119 in Marion Center	1961	1964	Now parts of an extended PA 403.
PA 224	13	21	PA 74 in Red Lion	US 30 in Wrightsville	1928	1932	Renumbered PA 624 to avoid conflict with US 224.
PA 225	48.579	78.180	US 22 /US 322 in Dauphin	PA 61 in Shamokin	1928	current	
PA 226	—	—	PA 26	PA 126 in Bethel Township	1928	1946	
PA 226	4.868	7.834	Ohio state line near Conneaut, Ohio	US 6N in Tracy	1961	current	Formerly PA 179.
PA 227	21.3	34.3	PA 8 in Rouseville	PA 127 in Harmony Township	1928	current	
PA 228	21.1	34.0	US 19 in Cranberry Township	PA 356 in Buffalo Township	1928	current	In 1970, segment north of PA 28 decommissionedl in 1984, section from PA 356 to PA 28 decommissioned.
PA 229	5	8.0	PA 29 in Emmaus	US 22 in Allentown	1928	1946	Now partially a segment of Partially now a segment of PA 29.
PA 230	28.355	45.633	US 22 in Harrisburg	PA 283 in Salunga	1967	current	Formerly US 230.
PA 231	26.7	43.0	PA 18 in East Finley Township	PA 50 in Independence Township	1928	current	
PA 232	25.157	40.486	US 1 / US 13 in Philadelphia	PA 32 in New Hope	1928	current	
PA 233	53.257	85.709	PA 997 in Mont Alto	PA 274 near Green Park	1928	current	Extended south from Centreville in 1937.
PA 234	38.322	61.673	US 30 in Franklin Township	PA 462 in West York	1928	current	Extended east from East Berlin in 1937.
PA 235	43	69	US 11 / US 15 in Liverpool	PA 45 near Laurelton	1928	current	
PA 236	32	51	US 119 near Savan	US 322 in Barnett	1928	1984	
PA 237	4	6.4	PA 37 in Lackawaxen	PA 137 near Lackawaxen	1928	1946	
PA 238	—	—	PA 38 in Richland Township	US 322 in Shippenville	1928	1959	Became part of an extended PA 208.
PA 238	5.396	8.684	PA 74 in Shiloh	PA 181 in Emigsville	1961	current	
PA 239	36.842	59.291	PA 93 in Nescopeck Township	PA 42 in North Mountain	1928	current	Extended south from US 11 in 1966.
PA 240	8.5	13.7	PA 286 in Commodore	US 219 near Cherry Tree	1966	current	
PA 241	23.620	38.013	PA 441 in Conoy Township	PA 72 in Lebanon	1928	current	
PA 242	28	45	PA 61 in Paxinos	PA 93 in Nescopeck	1928	1966	Extended north from Bloomsburg to Nescopeck in 1964; now segments of PA 339 and PA 487.
PA 243	8	13	US 422 in Myerstown	US 22 near Bethel	1928	1946	Became part of an extended PA 501.
PA 244	17.191	27.666	PA 44 near Oswayo	New York state line in Genesee Township	1928	current	
PA 245	2	3.2	US 309 in Slatington	PA 45 in Berlinsville	1928	1946	
PA 246	8.456	13.609	PA 46 in Corwins Corners	PA 346 in Prentisvale	1928	current	
PA 247	50.471	81.225	I-84 in Mount Cobb	PA 370 in Preston Park	1928	current	
PA 248	—	—	US 6 in Blakely	PA 348 in Mount Cobb	1928	1946	Became part of an extended PA 247.
PA 248	31.285	50.348	US 209 in Weissport East	PA 611 in Easton	1966	current	
PA 249	22.1	35.6	PA 287 in Middlebury Township	New York state line in Brookfield Township	1928	current	
PA 250	—	—	PA 550 in Buffalo Run	PA 53 in Potters Mills	1928	1932	Now a segment of US 322.
PA 250	—	—	US 220/US 322 in Port Matilda	PA 45 in Pennsylvania Furnace	1932	1946	
PA 250	7	11	PA 74 in York	US 30 in Yorkshire	1961	1973	
PA 251	11.595	18.660	SR 154 at the Ohio state line in South Beaver Township	PA 18 in Beaver Falls	1928	current	
PA 252	19.880	31.994	PA 320 near Chester	PA 23 in Valley Forge	1928	current	Segment in King of Prussia decommissioned in 1962.
PA 253	15.958	25.682	PA 53 in Van Ormer	PA 53 in Houtzdale	1928	current	
PA 254	30.1	48.4	PA 405 in Milton	PA 487 near Benton	1928	current	
PA 255	39.7	63.9	US 219 in DuBois	US 219 in Johnsonburg	1928	current	Extended south from Weedville to DuBois in 1935.
PA 256	1	1.6	PA 56 in Weinels Crossroads	PA 66 in Leechburg	1928	1946	
PA 257	5.12	8.24	US 322 in Cranberry Township	US 62 in Oil City	1930	current	Segment from US 322 to Rockland decommissioned in 1958; segment from Rockland to Freedom Falls decommissioned in 1955.
PA 258	26.9	43.3	PA 108 / PA 173 in Slippery Rock	PA 18 in Clark	1928	current	
PA 259	33.4	53.8	US 30 in Ligonier Township	US 422 in Cherryhill Township	1936	current	
PA 260	1	1.6	PA 403 in Johnstown	US 219 in Goods Corners	1928	1960	Became part of an extended PA 271.
PA 261	2.260	3.637	Delaware state line in Zebleys Corner	US 322 in Bethel Township	1928	current	
PA 262	—	—	PA 100 in Macungie	PA 29 in Emmaus	1928	1946	
PA 262	11.993	19.301	PA 114 in Fairview Township	PA 382 near York Haven	1961	current	
PA 263	20.139	32.411	PA 611 in Willow Grove	PA 32 in Centre Bridge	1928	current	
PA 264	9	14	US 22 in Duncansville	US 220 in Altoona	1928	1935	Replaced by PA 764.
PA 266	24	39	PA 21 near Morrisville	US 119 in Smithfield	1928	1955	
PA 267	30.780	49.536	US 6 in Meshoppen	New York state line in Choconut Township	1928	current	
PA 268	35.126	56.530	US 422 in West Kittanning	PA 38 / PA 208 in Emlenton	1928	current	
PA 270	6	9.7	PA 92 in Gelatt	PA 70 near Burnwood	1928	1946	
PA 271	47	76	PA 711 in Ligonier Township	US 219 in Northern Cambria	1935	current	
PA 272	54.666	87.976	MD 272 at Maryland state line near Nottingham	US 222 / PA 568 near Adamstown	1928	current	
PA 274	43.988	70.792	PA 75 in Fannett Township	US 11 / US 15 in Duncannon	1928	current	
PA 276	16	26	PA 76 near Three Springs	US 522 in Mount Union	1928	1964	Now segments of PA 747 and PA 994.
PA 277	7	11	PA 77 near Spartansburg	PA 426 in Corry	1928	1977	Became part of rerouted PA 77.
PA 278	17	27	Ohio state line near New Bedford	US 19 near Springfield Falls	1929	1959	Extended east from New Wilmington to Volant in 1937, and segment from Pulaski to West Middlesex became part of PA 551 in 1937. Most of the route was added to PA 208.
PA 280	4	6.4	PA 503 in Linhart	PA 80 in Rodi	1928	1946	Restored as PA 791 in 1963.
PA 281	45.8	73.7	WV 26 at West Virginia state line in Henry Clay Township	US 30 in Stoystown	1928	current	
PA 282	11.528	18.553	PA 82 in West Nantmeal Township	Bus. US 30 in Downingtown	1928	current	
PA 283	—	—	PA 83 in Monocacy	US 422 in Monocacy Station	1928	1946	
PA 283	—	—	I-76 in Highspire	I-83 in Paxtang	1961	1969	Became part of I-283.
PA 283	29.112	46.851	South Eisenhower Boulevard in Highspire	US 30 in Lancaster	1971	current	Officially designated SR 0300 due to I-283.
PA 284	9.043	14.553	PA 287 in English Center	I-99 / US 15 in McNett Township	1928	current	
PA 285	27.1	43.6	Ohio state line near Lake Pymatuning	PA 173 in Cochranton	1936	current	
PA 286	68.8	110.7	US 22 in Monroeville	US 219 in Burnside Township	1961	current	
PA 287	—	—	PA 87 in Lovelton	PA 187 in Lovelton	1928	1946	Became part of rerouted PA 187.
PA 287	63.965	102.942	US 220 / in Piatt Township	PA 49 in Lawrenceville	1961	current	
PA 288	15	24	PA 18 in Wampum	US 19 / PA 68 in Zelienople	1928	current	
PA 290	—	—	PA 191 near Analomink	PA 191 / PA 507 in Dreher Township	1928	1964	Now PA 447.
PA 290	9.173	14.763	I-79 / PA 5 in Erie	I-90 / PA 430 in Harborcreek Township	2006	current	
PA 291	14.014	22.553	US 13 / US 13 Bus. in Trainer	I-76 in Philadelphia	1928	current	
PA 292	11.483	18.480	PA 29 in Evans Falls	PA 92 in Exeter Township	1928	current	
PA 293	6	9.7	PA 29 in Conyngham	US 309 near Drums	1928	1946	
PA 294	5	8.0	PA 194 near Big Dam	PA 74 in Wellsville	1928	1946	
PA 295	6.287	10.118	PA 921 in Conewago Township	PA 262 near York Haven	1961	2018	Redesignated PA 297 in 2018 in response to extension of Interstate 295 into Pennsylvania.
PA 296	16.177	26.034	PA 191 in Lake Ariel	PA 247 in Clinton Township	1936	current	
PA 297	6.287	10.118	PA 921 in Conewago Township	PA 262 near York Haven	2018	current	Formerly PA 295.
PA 299	0.052	0.084	Railroad bridge on Powell Avenue in Millcreek Township	Railroad bridge on Powell Avenue in Millcreek Township	1930	current	Now the shortest state route in Pennsylvania and no longer signed; former 1.25 mile route severed by airport expansion in 2011.
PA 301	4	6.4	US 30 near Devon	US 30 / PA 201 near Bryn Mawr	1928	1946	Replaced by a segment of US 30.
PA 302	0.5	0.80	PA 612 in Stroudsburg	PA 611 in Stroudsburg	1928	1930	Replaced by a segment of US 611.
PA 303	4	6.4	US 22 in Geeseytown	US 22 in Canoe Creek	1928	1946	
PA 304	12.842	20.667	PA 45 in Mifflinburg	US 15 in Winfield	1928	current	
PA 305	28.7	46.2	US 22 in Alexandria	PA 655 in Belleville	1928	current	
PA 307	31.510	50.710	PA 435 in Covington Township	PA 92 in Tunkhannock Township	1928	current	Extended south from Scranton in 1935.
PA 308	28.5	45.9	PA 8 near Butler	SR 3013 in Irwin Township	1928	current	
PA 309	134.043	215.721	PA 611 in Philadelphia	PA 29 in Monroe Township	1968	current	Formerly US 309.
PA 310	12.552	20.200	US 119 in Punxsutawney	US 322 in Reynoldsville	1928	current	
PA 312	7	11	PA 663 in Quakertown	US 309 in Center Valley	1928	1946	
PA 313	18.021	29.002	PA 309 / PA 663 in Quakertown	PA 263 in Doylestown Township	1928	current	
PA 314	—	—	PA 214 in Shiremanstown	PA 641 near Shiremanstown	1928	1946	
PA 314	7.265	11.692	PA 940 in Pocono Summit	PA 715 in Pocono Township	1964	current	Formerly a segment of PA 940.
PA 315	8.212	13.216	PA 309 in Wilkes-Barre	I-81 at Wilkes-Barre/Scranton International Airport	1928	current	
PA 316	16.641	26.781	MD 60 at Maryland state line near Waynesboro	US 11 in Chambersburg	1928	current	From 1937 to 1947, route was extended north from Chambersburg to PA 944.
PA 317	4.832	7.776	SR 630 at Ohio state line in North Beaver Township	PA 108 / PA 551 in North Beaver Township	1928	current	
PA 318	15.916	25.614	SR 304 at Ohio state line in Shenango Township	PA 158 in Mercer	1928	current	Extended east from West Middlesex in 1937.
PA 319	12	19	West Virginia state line near Springhill	US 40 in Hopwood	1936	1946	
PA 320	18.832	30.307	US 13 / PA 291 in Chester	PA 23 in Swedeland	1928	current	
PA 321	43.829	70.536	US 219 in Wilcox	PA 346 in Corydon Township	1962	current	
PA 324	13.308	21.417	SR 3038 in Martic Township	US 222 / PA 272 in Lancaster	1928	current	Extended beyond New Danville in 1936.
PA 325	—	—	US 15 near Herndon	PA 225 near Mandata	1928	1940	Now a segment of PA 147.
PA 325	30.311	48.781	Riverview Road in Middle Paxton Township	US 209 in Tower City	1949	current	
PA 326	23.882	38.434	Maryland state line near Flintstone, MD	US 30 in Bedford	1928	current	Segment south of Bedford rerouted in 1963.
PA 327	—	—	PA 227 in Neiltown	US 62 near West Hickory	1928	1936	Now segments of PA 127 and PA 227.
PA 327	6	9.7	PA 36 near Stewarts Run	PA 227 in Neiltown	1936	1946	
PA 328	—	—	Valencia	PA 8 near Unionville	1936	1952	
PA 328	13.228	21.288	PA 287 in Tioga Junction	New York state line near Millerton	1961	current	
PA 329	—	—	Allentown	PA 145 in Cementon	1928	1946	Now a segment of PA 145.
PA 329	12.881	20.730	PA 873 in Neffs	PA 248 / PA 987 in Bath	1946	current	
PA 331	14.508	23.348	WV 67 at the West Virginia state line in Independence Township	PA 844 in Canton Township	1935	current	
PA 332	17.522	28.199	PA 263 in Hatboro	PA 32 in Yardley	1928	current	
PA 333	—	—	PA 433 in Lurgan	PA 433 near Green Village	1928	1964	Now segments of PA 997, PA 641, and PA 696.
PA 333	31.2	50.2	PA 103 in Juniata Terrace	PA 235 near Thompsontown	1965	current	
PA 334	5	8.0	PA 234 near Center Mills	PA 34 in Idaville	1928	1946	
PA 335	9	14	US 22 / US 322 in Mifflintown	PA 135 near East Salem	1928	1946	
PA 336	11	18	PA 286 in Glen Campbell	PA 236 near Rossiter	1928	1984	
PA 337	22	35	US 62 in Tidioute	US 6 / US 62 in Warren	1936	1984	
PA 338	13.589	21.869	PA 58 in Richland Township	US 322 in Ashland Township	1930	current	One former segment now part of PA 58.
PA 339	32.840	52.851	PA 54 in Mahanoy City	PA 93 in Nescopeck	1928	current	Extended in 1964 and 1966; one former segment is now part of PA 487.
PA 340	30.064	48.383	PA 462 near Lancaster	Bus. US 30 in Thorndale	1928	current	
PA 341	10.694	17.210	PA 230 / PA 341 Truck in Londonderry Township	PA 241 in South Londonderry Township	1928	current	
PA 342	35	56	PA 45 in Mahanoy City	PA 115 near Jerseytown	1928	1941	Became segments of PA 44; PA 487, and PA 339
PA 343	8.159	13.131	PA 72 in Lebanon	I-78 in Fredericksburg	1928	current	
PA 344	10	16	PA 44 in Millport	New York state line near Eleven Mile	1928	1946	
PA 345	—	—	US 45 near Girardville	PA 45 near Gilberton	1928	1946	
PA 345	13.436	21.623	PA 82 in West Nantmeal Township	US 422 near Birdsboro	1972	current	
PA 346	34.177	55.003	New York state line in Corydon Township	PA 446 in Eldred	1928	current	
PA 347	10.803	17.386	SR 2020 in Dunmore	PA 524 in Scott Township	1928	current	
PA 348	7.211	11.605	PA 435 near Elmhurst	PA 590 near Hollisterville	1936	current	
PA 349	13.3	21.4	US 6 in Gaines Township	PA 49 in Westfield	1928	current	
PA 350	—	—	PA 550 near Port Matilda	PA 53 / US 322 in Philipsburg	1928	1932	Became a segment of rerouted US 322.
PA 350	21.9	35.2	PA 45 in Franklin Township	PA 53 / PA 504 in Philipsburg	1932	current	Truncated in 1975, with former segments added to US 220 and PA 453.
PA 351	17.3	27.8	SR 617 at the Ohio state line in Little Beaver Township	PA 65 / PA 288 in Ellwood City	1928	current	One former segment is now part of PA 551.
PA 352	18.583	29.906	US 13 Bus. in Chester	US 30 in East Whiteland Township	1928	current	
PA 353	9	14	PA 253 in Viola	Henderson	1928	1946	Some segments now part of PA 153.
PA 354	1	1.6	PA 254 near Washingtonville	PA 876 in Strawberry Ridge	1928	1946	
PA 356	32.3	52.0	PA 66 in Washington Township	US 422 in Butler Township	1928	current	
PA 358	25.2	40.6	Ohio state line near West Salem Township	US 62 / PA 173 in Sandy Lake	1928	current	
PA 359	16	26	PA 56 in Spring Church	PA 66 in Manorville	1936	1981	
PA 360	6	9.7	PA 580 in Cherry Tree	PA 80 in Arcadia	1928	1946	
PA 362	5.341	8.596	US 6 in Shippen Township	PA 660 in Delmar Township	1941	current	
PA 363	11.960	19.248	US 422 in Audubon	PA 63 in Lansdale	1928	current	
PA 364	10	16	Orviston	PA 150 in Beech Creek	1930	1992	
PA 366	14.8	23.8	PA 28 in Tarentum	PA 66 in Washington Township	1928	current	
PA 367	12.53	20.17	US 6 in Braintrim Township	PA 267 in Rush Township	1928	current	
PA 368	7.367	11.856	PA 268 in Parker	PA 58 in Callensburg	1928	current	One former segment now part of PA 58.
PA 370	16.733	26.929	PA 171 in Ararat Township	PA 191 in Buckingham Township	1928	current	Eastern segment added in 1946.
PA 371	23.541	37.886	PA 171 / PA 374 near Union Dale	New York state line in Damascus Township	1936	current	
PA 372	34.912	56.185	PA 74 in Lower Chanceford Township	PA 82 in Coatesville	1928	current	
PA 374	17.709	28.500	PA 92 in Lenox Township	PA 171 / PA 371 in Herrick Township	1961	current	
PA 376	22	35	PA 176 in Maddensville	US 22 in Mapleton	1928	1964	Now segments of PA 655 and PA 829.
PA 377	5	8.0	PA 376 in Three Springs	PA 176 in Orbisonia	1936	1946	Now a segment of PA 994.
PA 378	—	—	PA 38 / PA 208 near Emlenton	PA 58 in Callensburg	1936	1961	Most of route is now included in PA 478; one segment became part of PA 58.
PA 378	9.555	15.377	PA 309 in Upper Saucon Township	US 22 in Bethlehem	1971	current	Originated as I-378.
PA 380	32.8	52.8	I-579 in Downtown Pittsburgh	PA 286 in Bell Township	1928	current	Extended into downtown Pittsburgh in 1960. Officially designated SR 0400 due to I-380.
PA 381	49.3	79.3	CR 8 at the West Virginia state line in Wharton Township	US 30 near Ligonier	1928	current	
PA 382	—	—	Joanna	PA 82 near Joanna	1928	1946	
PA 382	11.786	18.968	PA 181 in York Haven	PA 114 near Bunches	1961	current	
PA 383	10	16	PA 183 in Pleasant Valley	US 222 in Maiden Creek	1928	1964	Portions became part of PA 73.
PA 387	1	1.6	PA 187 near Wyalusing	US 6 / US 309 in Wyalusing	1928	1946	
PA 388	—	—	PA 18 in New Brighton	US 13 in New Castle	1928	1937	Became part of PA 65.
PA 388	8.37	13.47	PA 65 in Shenango Township	PA 168 in Hickory Township	1937	current	
PA 390	25.301	40.718	PA 940 in Paradise Township	PA 507 in Tafton View	1928	current	
PA 391	2	3.2	US 13 in Ridley Park	PA 420 in Morton	1928	1954	
PA 392	—	—	PA 92 in Gelatt	PA 70 (now PA 171) in Thompson	1928	1936	Became part of an extended PA 570.
PA 392	5.168	8.317	PA 177 near Lewisberry	PA 262 near Goldsboro	1961	current	
PA 393	4	6.4	PA 93 in Nescopeck	PA 29 in Wapwallopen	1928	1946	Now a segment of PA 29.
PA 394	13.452	21.649	PA 234 in Biglerville	PA 94 in Hampton	1928	current	
PA 399	7	11	PA 5 in Erie	PA 5 in Erie	1936	1938	Now PA 5 Alternate.
PA 401	20.175	32.469	PA 23 near Elverson	US 30 in East Whiteland Township	1928	current	
PA 402	29.240	47.057	Bus. US 209 in Smithfield Township	US 6 in Palmyra Township	1928	current	
PA 403	63.7	102.5	US 30 in Quemahoning Township	US 119 in East Mahoning Township	1928	current	
PA 404	31	50	US 11 in Shamokin Dam	PA 554 in South Williamsport	1928	1941	Extended in 1935.
PA 405	—	—	US 322 in Phillipsburg	US 322 in Sandy Ridge	1928	1932	Now a segment of PA 350.
PA 405	35.124	56.527	PA 61 in Sunbury	US 220 in Hughesville	1941	current	
PA 407	12.470	20.069	US 6 / US 11 near Clarks Summit	PA 374 in Lenox Township	1928	current	
PA 408	24.2	38.9	US 6 / US 19 / PA 86 in Cambridge Springs	PA 8 in Hydetown	1928	current	
PA 409	4.012	6.457	US 6 in Standing Stone Township	PA 706 in Camptown	1935	current	
PA 410	8.97	14.44	US 119 in Henderson Township	US 219 / US 3221 in Brady Township	1928	current	
PA 412	17.745	28.558	PA 611 in Nockamixon Township	PA 378 in Bethlehem	1928	current	
PA 413	17.745	28.558	New Jersey state line in Bristol Township	PA 611 in Bedminster Township	1930	current	Until 1946, continued southwest to PA 313; that section is now part of PA 113.
PA 414	79.4	127.8	PA 44 near Waterville	US 220 in Monroe	1928	current	
PA 415	10.035	16.150	PA 309 in Dallas	PA 29 in Noxen Township	1928	current	Splits into two routes around Harveys Lake, both carrying two-way traffic.
PA 416	17.447	28.078	Maryland state line in Montgomery Township	US 30 in St. Thomas Township	1928	current	Extended in 1937.
PA 417	12.12	19.51	US 322 in Franklin	PA 8 in Cherrytree Township	1936	current	
PA 418	2.750	4.426	PA 718 / PA 760 in Wheatland	US 62 in Hermitage	1928	current	
PA 419	28.109	45.237	US 322 in West Cornwall Township	PA 183 in Bethel Township	1962	current	
PA 420	5.600	9.012	PA 291 in Tinicum Township	PA 320 in Springfield Township	1928	current	
PA 423	14.319	23.044	PA 940 in Pocono Pines	PA 191 near South Sterling	1965	current	Formerly PA 490.
PA 424	3.749	6.033	I-81 in Hazle Township	PA 93 near Hazleton	2000	current	May be extended westward to PA 924.
PA 425	—	—	US 15 (now PA 147) in Herndon	PA 225 in Red Cross	1928	1946	
PA 425	24.608	39.603	PA 851 in Fawn Grove	PA 124 / PA 624 near East Prospect	1966	current	Formerly a segment of PA 124.
PA 426	—	—	PA 26 in Yellow Creek	PA 867 in Bakers Summit	1928	1946	Renumbered as PA 868.
PA 426	27	43	North: NY 426 at New York state line in North East Township; South: PA 27 in Pittsfield Township	North: PA 89 in North East; South: NY 426 at New York state line in Wayne Township	1946	current	North: 7 miles, South: 20 miles.
PA 427	10.7	17.2	US 322 in Sugarcreek	PA 27 near Bradleytown	1928	current	
PA 428	19.4	31.2	US 62 / PA 8 in Oil City	PA 408 in Troy Township	1936	current	
PA 430	13.703	22.053	US 20 in Wesleyville	NY 430 at New York state line in Greenfield Township	1959	current	
PA 432	9	14	US 1 in Oakwood	PA 332 in Yardley	1928	1966	
PA 433	9.125	14.685	US 11 in Greene Township	PA 997 in Lurgan Township	1928	current	Some former segments now parts of PA 997 and PA 641.
PA 434	12.471	20.070	PA 739 in Lords Valley	New York state line in Shohola Township	1967	current	Formerly PA 37.
PA 435	—	—	PA 75 in Port Royal	PA 35 in Mifflin	1928	1946	Now a segment of PA 333.
PA 435	14.925	24.019	I-380 near Gouldsboro	I-84 / I-380 in Dunmore	1972	current	Formerly a segment of US 611.
PA 436	1.969	3.169	US 119 in Punxsutawney	PA 36 in Punxsutawney	1928	current	The shortest state route in Pennsylvania until 2011; supplanted by PA 299.
PA 437	11.2	18.0	PA 640 in White Haven	PA 309 in Mountain Top	1964	current	
PA 438	10.1	16.3	US 6 / US 11 near Dalton	PA 247 in Scott Township	1961	current	
PA 439	14	23	PA 254 near Jerseytown	PA 339 in Benton	1928	1936	Now a segment of PA 254.
PA 441	32.490	52.288	PA 999 in Manor Township	Paxton Street near Harrisburg	1928	current	
PA 442	14.701	23.659	PA 405 in Muncy	PA 42 in Iola	1928	current	
PA 443	80.514	129.575	North Front Street in Middle Paxton Township	US 209 in Lehighton	1928	current	
PA 445	11.998	19.309	PA 45 in Millheim	PA 64 in Nittany	1928	current	
PA 446	13.0	20.9	New York state line near Portville, New York	PA 46 in Keating Township	1928	current	
PA 447	—	—	US 106/PA 47 in Lenox	PA 547 in Hartford	1928	1929	
PA 447	26.665	42.913	US 209 in Smithfield Township	PA 191 / PA 507 in Dreher Township	1964	current	
PA 449	17.131	27.570	US 6 in Walton	New York state line in Genesee Township	1928	current	
PA 450	8	13	US 220 / PA 350 in Bald Eagle	PA 45 in Seven Stars	1928	1946	Now a segment of PA 350.
PA 451	4	6.4	PA 351 in New Galilee	PA 18 in Koppel	1928	1937	Now a segment of PA 351.
PA 452	7.097	11.422	US 13 in Marcus Hook	PA 352 in Lima	1928	current	
PA 453	43.7	70.3	US 22 in Water Street	PA 879 in Curwensville	1930	current	Extended in 1935.
PA 454	8	13	PA 115 / PA 254 in Jerseytown	PA 54 near Exchange	1928	1941	Now a segment of PA 44.
PA 456	12.140	19.537	Maryland state line in Warren Township	PA 16 near Cove Gap	1937	current	
PA 458	3	4.8	Ohio state line near Jamestown	US 322 in Jamestown	1930	1946	Became part of an extended PA 58.
PA 462	31.889	51.320	US 30 near West York	US 30 near Lancaster	1970	current	Formerly a segment of US 30.
PA 463	12.886	20.738	PA 63 in Hatfield Township	PA 611 in Horsham	1928	current	
PA 464	5	8.0	US 220 in Sonetown	PA 154 in Nordmont	1928	1946	
PA 465	6.644	10.692	PA 174 in Mooreville	PA 641 near Carlisle	1963	current	
PA 466	5	8.0	PA 66 in North Washington	PA 56 in Weinels Crossroads	1928	1946	Became part of an extended PA 356.
PA 467	17.056	27.449	PA 187 in Rome	PA 706 near Stevens Township	1928	current	
PA 468	10	16	PA 551 near Pulaski	PA 318 in Hoagland	1937	1985	
PA 470	9	14	PA 570 in Starrucca	PA 70 in Lanesboro	1928	1946	
PA 471	5	8.0	PA 267 near Friendsville	PA 858 near Friendsville	1936	1946	
PA 472	20.842	33.542	PA 841 in Elk Township	PA 372 in Quarryville	1928	current	
PA 474	3.2	5.1	PA 8 / PA 89 in Wattsburg	New York state line in Venango Township	1984	current	
PA 475	19.619	31.574	US 522 in Dublin Township	PA 994 near Rockhill Furnace	1964	current	Previously PA 176.
PA 476	1	1.6	US 522 / PA 126 in Warfordsburg	PA 76 near Warfordsburg	1930	1946	
PA 477	17.7	28.5	PA 192 in Miles Township	PA 64 near Mill Hall	1967	current	Previously a segment of PA 880.
PA 478	2.2	3.5	PA 38 / PA 208 near Emlenton	PA 58 in St. Petersburg	1961	current	Previously designated as PA 378.
PA 480	23	37	US 422 in Strongstown	US 119 in Marion Center	1928	1961	Replaced by PA 223 until that route was decommissioned in 1964; designation was changed because I-76 was originally proposed as I-480.
PA 481	12.947	20.836	US 40 in Centerville	PA 88 / PA 136 / PA 837 in Monongahela	1947	current	
PA 482	3	4.8	US 122 near New Morgan	PA 82 near Scarlets Mills	1928	1946	
PA 483	7	11	US 422 in Womelsdorf	PA 83 in Rehrersburg	1928	1946	Now a segment of PA 419.
PA 484	14.543	23.405	PA 26 in Union Township	PA 655 near Warfordsburg	1964	current	
PA 487	64.3	103.5	PA 61 in Shamokin Township	PA 87 near Dushore	1928	current	
PA 488	17	27	PA 65 / PA 288 in Ellwood City	US 422 in Franklin Township	1928	current	Extended in 1937, but truncated to Portersville in 1966.
PA 490	14	23	PA 940 in Pocono Pines	PA 191 near South Sterling	1928	1965	Now PA 423.
PA 491	6.02	9.69	US 202 in Concordville	Delaware state line in Lower Chichester Township	1928	current	
PA 492	8.189	13.179	US 11 in New Milford	PA 92 in Jackson Township	1928	current	
PA 501	38.695	62.274	US 222 / PA 272 in Lancaster	PA 895 near Pine Grove	1928	current	
PA 502	13.776	22.170	US 11 in Moosic	PA 435 in Covington Township	1928	current	
PA 503	6	9.7	PA 130 / PA 993 in Turtle Creek	PA 80 in Universal	1928	1946	
PA 504	81.4	131.0	US 15 (now I-180)	PA 54 in Turbotville	1928	1936	Became part of rerouted PA 54.
PA 504	24.540	39.493	PA 53 / PA 350 in Philipsburg	US 220 Alternate / PA 144 in Wingate	1941	current	
PA 505	—	—	US 19 (now PA 97) in Millcreek Township	US 20 in Erie	1928	1932	Became part of rerouted US 19.
PA 505	2.86	4.60	PA 97 in Millcreek Township	US 20 in Erie	1932	current	Assumed a former alignment of US 19.
PA 507	27.244	43.845	I-380 / PA 435 in Philipsburg	US 6 in Palmyra Township	1928	current	
PA 512	26.105	42.012	US 22 in Hanover Township	PA 611 in Upper Mount Bethel Township	1928	current	Moved to its current route southwest of Moorestown in 1940; the old route became part of an extended PA 946.
PA 513	6.522	10.496	US 13 in Bensalem Township	PA 413 in Penndel	1928	current	
PA 514	10.635	17.115	PA 14 in Troy Township	PA 414 in Franklin Township	1928	current	
PA 515	4	6.4	PA 415 near Idletown	PA 415 at Harveys Lake	1928	1946	Now the eastern spur of PA 415 around Harveys Lake.
PA 516	12.461	20.054	MD 86 at Maryland state line in Manheim Township	PA 116 in Spring Grove	1930	current	Extended south from PA 216 to New Freedom in 1937; rerouted west to current terminus 1966; the old route became part of PA 851.
PA 518	8.5	13.7	PA 18 in Hermitage	PA 18 in Hermitage	1928	current	
PA 519	18.7	30.1	US 40 in North Bethlehem Township	PA 50 in Mt. Pleasant Township	1936	current	
PA 520	7	11	PA 352 in Chester	US 13 in Darby	1928	1946	
PA 523	7.47	12.02	US 40 in Addison	PA 281 in Confluence	1970	current	
PA 524	4.733	7.617	PA 407 in Lackawanna State Park	PA 438 in Scott Township	1961	current	
PA 527	1	1.6	McArthur Run Road near West Hickory	PA 127 in West Hickory	1928	1946	
PA 528	22	35	US 19 in Jackson Township	PA 8 in Brady Township	1936	current	
PA 529	1	1.6	PA 29 in Exeter	PA 92 in West Pittston	1928	1933	
PA 531	4	6.4	PA 430 in Harborcreek Township	US 20 in Harborcreek Township	1962	current	
PA 532	19.125	30.779	US 1 in Philadelphia	PA 32 in Washington Crossing	1928	current	
PA 533	21.738	34.984	Mountain Road/Valley Road in Upper Strasburg	PA 233 in Newville	1930	current	Extended west from Pleasant Hall and east from Shippensburg in 1937.
PA 534	23.535	37.876	PA 940 in East Side	US 209 in Polk Township	1964	current	
PA 535	6	9.7	PA 75 near Spruce Hill	PA 35 in Nook	1928	1946	
PA 536	16.64	26.78	PA 28 in Redbank Township	PA 36 in Young Township	1928	current	
PA 539	11	18	PA 254 in Benton	PA 42 in North Mountain	1928	1966	Now a segment of PA 239.
PA 541	2	3.2	Pine Street in Steelton	PA 14 in Harrisburg	1928	1955	
PA 542	5	8.0	PA 44 in Exchange	PA 442 in Opp	1928	1946	
PA 543	5	8.0	PA 14 in Paxtang	PA 39 in Beaufort Farms	1928	1955	
PA 545	40	64	US 22 in Huntingdon	PA 550 in Bellefonte	1928	1963	Became parts of PA 26 and PA 150.
PA 546	3.586	5.771	PA 346 in Otto Township	New York state line in Otto Township	1928	current	
PA 547	11.000	17.703	US 11 in Harford Township	PA 492 in Jackson Township	1928	current	
PA 549	19.15	30.82	US 6 in Richmond Township	PA 328 in Wells Township	1928	current	
PA 550	36.4	58.6	PA 45 Truck / PA 453 in Snyder Township	PA 64 in Zion	1928	current	
PA 551	33.6	54.1	PA 18 in Beaver Falls	PA 18 in Shenango Township	1928	current	Section from New Castle to Mount Jackson became part of PA 108 in 1937; while the route was expanded to its current termini.
PA 552	3	4.8	PA 551 in Derringer Corners	PA 108 / PA 551 in Mount Jackson	1940	1946	
PA 553	19.5	31.4	US 422 in Cherryhill Township	US 219 in East Carroll Township	1928	current	Former eastern segment decommissioned in 1946.
PA 554	8.76	14.10	PA 44 in Washington Township	US 15 in South Williamsport	1928	current	
PA 555	26.332	42.377	PA 255 in Jay Township	PA 120 in Driftwood	1928	current	Former western segment added to PA 255 in 1935.
PA 562	13.920	22.402	US 422 Business in St. Lawrence	PA 73 in Boyertown	1930	current	
PA 563	21.151	34.039	PA 63 in Upper Salford Township	PA 412 in Nockamixon Township	1928	current	
PA 564	3	4.8	US 220 in Foley Corner	PA 487 near Bernice	1928	1966	
PA 566	8	13	PA 56 / PA 66 in North Vandergrift	PA 66 near Crooked Creek Lake State Park	1928	1938	Now PA 66 Alternate.
PA 568	11.603	18.673	US 222 / PA 272 near Adamstown	PA 724 in Robeson Township	1962	current	
PA 570	23	37	PA 92 in Gelatt	PA 90 near Starlight	1928	1946	One segment was added to PA 370.
PA 572	10	16	PA 372 in Christiana	PA 82 in Coatesville	1928	1946	Became part of rerouted PA 372.
PA Turnpike 576	19.2	30.9	I-376 in Findlay Township	I-79 in Cecil Township	2006	current	Also known as the Southern Beltway; sometimes described inaccurately as I-576.
PA 580	11.603	18.673	PA 403 in Cherryhill Township	US 219 in Cherry Tree	1928	current	Extended to its northern terminus in 1935.
PA 581	7.36	11.84	I-81 near Enola	I-83 in Lemoyne	1992	current	Part of the Capital Beltway.
PA 582	5	8.0	US 22 / US 119 in Blairsville	US 119 in Black Lick	1930	1946	
PA 588	15	24	PA 51 in Chippewa Township	US 19 / PA 68 in Zelienople	1928	current	
PA 590	45.064	72.523	PA 435 in Elmhurst Township	PA 434 in Lackawaxen Township	1928	current	
PA 591	1	1.6	PA 491 near Ogden	PA 161 in Gardendale	1928	1932	
PA 592	3	4.8	PA 92 in North Jackson	PA 570 near North Jackson	1928	1946	
PA 601	26.669	42.920	PA 31 / PA 281 in Somerset	PA 56 in Paint	1928	current	Includes a former segment of US 219.
PA 602	6	9.7	US 11 in Hallstead	New York state line near Hallstead	1928	1946	Now a segment of PA 171.
PA 604	6	9.7	PA 654 in Nisbet	PA 554 in South Williamsport	1928	1930	Now a segment of PA 654.
PA 607	6.76	10.88	PA 872 in Austin	PA 155 in Keating Township	1928	current	Segment northeast of Austin became part of an extended PA 872 in 1935.
PA 611	109.685	176.521	I-95 in Philadelphia	I-380 in Coolbaugh Township	1972	current	Formerly US 611.
PA 612	12	19	PA 115 in Saylorsburg	PA 402 in East Stroudsburg	1928	1946	
PA 613	9	14	PA 313 near Hagersville	PA 212 in Pleasant Valley	1928	1946	
PA 615	6	9.7	PA 940 in Pocono Summit	PA 90 in Paradise Valley	1928	1946	Restored as part of PA 940 in 1964; now a segment of PA 314.
PA 616	14.895	23.971	PA 851 in Railroad	US 30 in West Manchester Township	1930	current	Extended south to Maryland in 1937; truncated to current southern terminus 1966; the truncated segment is now part of PA 851.
PA 618	3	4.8	US 6 in Sadsbury Township	PA 18 in Summit Township	1928	current	
PA 624	13.379	21.531	PA 24 in Red Lion	PA 462 in Wrightsville	1932	current	Formerly PA 224.
PA 625	16.687	26.855	PA 23 in East Earl Township	Bus. US 222 in Reading	1966	current	
PA 629	17	27	US 11 in Pittston	US 6 near Clarks Summit	1928	1946	
PA 632	—	—	PA 532 in Newtown	New Jersey border at Washington Crossing	1928	1946	Became segments of PA 532 and PA 332.
PA 632	7.923	12.751	US 6 / US 11 in Dalton	PA 247 in Scott Township	1961	current	
PA 633	3	4.8	Upper Strasburg	PA 333 / PA 533 in Pleasant Hall	1930	1937	Now a segment of PA 533.
PA 639	5	8.0	US 522 near Paxtonville	PA 104 in Middleburg	1928	1946	
PA 641	57.896	93.175	US 522 near Shade Gap	US 11 / US 15 in Camp Hill	1928	current	Extended west of Carlisle in 1937, and to its western terminus in 1964.
PA 642	—	—	US 220 in Hughesville	PA 539 (now PA 239)	1928	1952	Now a segment of PA 118.
PA 642	21.5	34.6	US 15 in Kelly Township	PA 44 / PA 254 in Madison Township	1952	current	Formerly a segment of PA 115.
PA 643	—	—	US 322 in Paxtang	US 22 in Penbrook	1928	1930	
PA 643	7.34	11.81	I-70 in Brush Creek Township	US 522 in Bethel Township	1964	current	
PA 645	14.120	22.724	US 422 in Myerstown	PA 443 in Pine Grove Township	1962	current	
PA 646	19.153	30.824	PA 59 in Keating Township	New York state line in Foster Township	1928	current	
PA 647	4	6.4	PA 107 in Tompkinsville	US 106 in Clifford	1929	1946	
PA 651	12	19	Ohio state line near Cannelton	PA 18 in Homewood	1928	1946	
PA 652	—	—	US 30 in Strafford	PA 23 near Port Kennedy	1928	1946	
PA 652	10.559	16.993	US 6 in Indian Orchard	New York state line near Darbytown	1972	current	Formerly a segment of US 106.
PA 653	26.4	42.5	PA 381 in Springfield Township	Mason Dixon Highway in Garrett	1928	current	
PA 654	11.702	18.833	PA 44 in Limestone Township	US 15 in South Williamsport	1928	current	
PA 655	82.916	133.440	US 522 in Needmore	US 322 in Reedsville	1964	current	Formerly PA 76.
PA 660	24.307	39.118	Leonard Harrison State Park	I-99 / US 15 / US 15 Business in Richmond Township	1930	current	
PA 662	26.171	42.118	US 422 in Douglassville	PA 61 in Shoemakersville	1930	current	
PA 663	22.134	35.621	PA 100 in Pottstown	PA 309 / PA 313 in Quakertown	1930	current	
PA 664	17.591	28.310	PA 120 in Lock Haven	PA 44 in Haneyville	1930	current	
PA 666	33.557	54.005	US 62 in Hickory Township	US 6 in Sheffield	1928	current	
PA 669	5.824	9.373	MD 669 at Maryland state line in Elk Lick Township	US 219 in Salisbury	1963	current	
PA 670	21.264	34.221	PA 191 in Honesdale	PA 370 in Preston Township	1929	current	
PA 672	9	14	PA 72 in Lancaster	PA 72 in Manheim	1928	1946	Now a segment of PA 772.
PA 680	21.5	34.6	US 30 in Kingston	PA 80 near Jacksonville	1930	1961	Now PA 217; designation changed because I-676 was originally proposed as I-680.
PA 683	7	11	PA 23 in Hiestand	US 422 in Trappe	1930	1946	
PA 690	12.533	20.170	PA 502 in Spring Brook Township	PA 590 in Salem Township	1928	current	
PA 692	8	13	US 11 in Great Bend	PA 92 in Oakland	1928	1946	Now a segment of PA 171.
PA 696	16.017	25.777	PA 997 in Greene Township	PA 997 in Hopewell Township	1930	current	Extended north from Scotland in 1937.
PA 701	5	8.0	US 13 in Bristol	US 13 in Tullytown	1930	1932	
PA 702	5	8.0	PA 115 in Wind Gap	PA 712 in Bangor	1935	1946	Restored in 1971 as an extension of PA 512.
PA 706	36.1	58.1	US 6 in Wyalusing	US 11 in Milford	1972	current	Formerly segments of US 6 and US 106.
PA 707	2	3.2	US 6 / US 11 in Dalton	PA 407 in Waverly	1930	1946	Restored as part of PA 632 in 1961.
PA 709	6	9.7	US 611 near Martins Creek	New Jersey state line near Riverton	1940	1946	
PA 711	55	89	US 119 / PA 201 / PA 711 Truck in Connellsville	PA 403 in East Wheatfield Township	1928	current	
PA 712	11	18	US 611 in Martins Creek	US 611 in Mount Bethel	1933	1946	Northern half restored in 1971 as an extension of PA 512.
PA 713	5	8.0	US 13 in Croydon	US 1 in South Langhorne	1930	1946	
PA 715	17.656	28.415	US 209 in Chestnuthill Township	PA 191 in Paradise Township	1963	current	
PA 718	11	18	PA 65 in Shenango Township	SR 305 at Ohio State Line in South Pymatuning Township	1930	current	
PA 722	8.820	14.194	PA 283 in East Hempfield Township	PA 272 in Manheim Township	1930	current	
PA 724	30.553	49.170	US 422 in Sinking Spring	PA 23 in East Pikeland Township	1962	current	
PA 729	—	—	PA 100 in Clayton	PA 29 near Hereford	1930	1946	
PA 729	22.077	35.529	PA 253 / PA 453 in Gulich Township	US 219 / PA 879 in Grampian	1969	current	
PA 731	—	—	US 309 (now PA 309) in Fort Washington	PA 73 in Wyncote	1930	1952	
PA 731	4.80	7.72	PA 484 in Union Township	I-70 in Union Township	1964	current	
PA 732	4	6.4	US 1 in Morrisville	PA 532 in Yardley	1930	1946	
PA 737	10.588	17.040	US 222 in Kutztown	PA 143 in Kempton	1962	current	
PA 739	19.369	31.171	New Jersey state line near Dingmans Ferry	US 6 in Blooming Grove	1967	current	
PA 741	25.277	40.679	Rohrerstown Road near East Petersburg	PA 41 in Gap	1930	current	
PA 742	0.5	0.80	PA 61 in Paxinos	PA 242 near Paxinos	1928	1962	Now a segment of PA 487.
PA 743	24.685	39.727	PA 441 in Marietta	US 22 in Grantville	1930	current	
PA 746	3	4.8	PA 59 in Aiken	PA 46 in Rew	1930	1946	Became part of an extended PA 646 in 1952.
PA 747	15.28	24.59	PA 994 in Three Springs	US 22 in Mount Union	1964	current	Includes a former segment of US 522.
PA 752	1.8	2.9	PA 63 in Horsham	US 611 in Horsham	1930	1932	
PA 756	7.19	11.57	PA 403 in Johnstown	PA 160 in Adams Township	1930	current	
PA 760	5.5	8.9	I-80 / I-376 in Shenanago Township	Business U.S. 62 / PA 718 in Sharon	2009	current	Formerly a segment of PA 60.
PA 763	3	4.8	PA 263 in Hatboro	PA 232 in Albidale	1930	1932	
PA 764	11.40	18.35	US 22 in Allegheny Township	I-99 / US 220 in Antis Township	1935	current	Formerly a segment of US 220.
PA 766	2.10	3.38	PA 180 in Jeannette	PA 66 in Greensburg	1930	1946	
PA 770	12.2	19.6	PA 59 in Lafayette Township	PA 646 in Keating Township	1962	current	Formerly a segment of PA 59.
PA 772	38.495	61.952	PA 441 near Marietta	US 30 near Gap	1930	current	
PA 780	8.49	13.66	PA 64 in Lamar	PA 880 in Loganton	1930	1967	Now a segment of PA 880.
PA 780	8.49	13.66	PA 56 / PA 366 in New Kensington	PA 380 in Washington Township	1936	current	
PA 790	2	3.2	PA 290 near Hemlock Grove	PA 507 in Greentown	1930	1946	
PA 791	2.1	3.4	US 22 Bus. in Churchill	PA 380 in Penn Hills	1963	current	
PA 796	5.784	9.308	PA 896 in New London Township	PA 41 in Londonderry Township	1930	current	
PA 802	5	8.0	PA 28 / PA 519 in Heidelberg	US 19 / PA 51 in Pittsburgh	1940	1946	Now partially covered by PA 121.
PA 805	7	11	PA 8 / PA 28 in Pittsburgh	PA 8 / PA 28 in Millvale	1940	1946	
PA 808	2	3.2	PA 28 in Sharpsburg	PA 836 in O'Hara Township	1940	1946	
PA 813	4	6.4	PA 113 in Reliance	US 309 in Sellersville	1930	1946	
PA 819	46	74	PA 201 in Vanderbilt	PA 66 in Washington Township	1930	current	
PA 820	7	11	PA 241 near Colebrook	US 422 in Palmyra	1929	1946	Became part of an extended PA 117.
PA 821	1	1.6	US 222 near Temple	US 222 near Temple	1929	1946	
PA 823	3	4.8	Big Shanty	US 219 in Lewis Run	1929	1932	
PA 824	1	1.6	Bendersville	PA 34 near Bendersville	1928	1946	
PA 825	0.25	0.40	Janesville	PA 253 near Janesville	1929	1946	Restored as part of PA 729 in 1969. Southern segment running from PA 453 to US 220 in Tyrone, Pennsylvania was decommissioned in 1941.
PA 826	12	19	US 15 in Tioga Junction	PA 549 near Mosherville	1928	1941	Became part of an extended PA 84; now PA 328.
PA 827	1	1.6	US 611 in Martins Creek	Near Martins Creek	1929	1933	Became part of rerouted US 611; now PA 611.
PA 828	1	1.6	US 220 in Williamsport	US 15 in Garden View	1930	1975	
PA 829	—	—	PA 35 in Tell Township	PA 75 in Waterloo	1928	1946	
PA 829	17.04	27.42	PA 655 in Cass Township	US 22 in Mill Creek	1964	current	Formerly a segment of PA 376.
PA 830	10.99	17.69	I-80 in Washington Township	US 219 in Sandy Township	1928	current	
PA 831	2	3.2	US 220 in Altoona	US 220 in Greenwood	1928	1928	
PA 832	11.157	17.955	PA 98 in Fairview Township	Entrance to Presque Isle State Park near Erie	1928	current	
PA 833	5	8.0	PA 96 in Buffalo Mills	PA 96 near Sulfur Springs	1928	1946	
PA 834	7	11	PA 92 in Dallas	PA 292 in Center Moreland	1928	1946	
PA 835	4	6.4	PA 8 in Talley Cavey	PA 910 near Dorseyville	1928	1946	
PA 836	14	23	PA 910 in Dorseyville	PA 8 in Talley Cavey	1928	1946	
PA 837	40.3	64.9	PA 88 in Carroll Township	US 19 / PA 51 / PA 60 in Pittsburgh's West End neighborhood	1928	current	Extended south from New Eagle to Carroll Township in 1935.
PA 838	14	23	PA 187 in Windham Center	PA 858 in Little Meadows	1928	1946	
PA 839	21.29	34.26	PA 85 near Nu Mine	PA 28 / PA 66 in South Bethlehem	1928	current	
PA 840	7	11	PA 82 in Towerville	PA 162 near Romansville	1928	1946	
PA 841	17.316	27.867	MD 213 at Maryland state line in Lewisville	PA 82 in Doe Run	1928	current	
PA 842	15.019	24.171	PA 841 in West Marlborough Township	US 322 Business in West Chester	1928	current	
PA 843	7	11	PA 80 in Commodore	PA 580 in Uniontown (Indiana County)	1928	1946	Restored in 1966 as part of PA 240.
PA 844	—	—	PA 80 (now PA 286) in Clarksburg	Elders Ridge	1928	1946	
PA 844	14.970	24.092	WV 27 at the West Virginia state line in Independence Township	PA 18 in Washington	1964	current	Previously a segment of PA 31.
PA 845	3.03	4.88	US 62 in Stoneboro	PA 358 in Lake Township	1928	current	
PA 846	12.41	19.97	PA 718 in Hermitage	PA 18 in Greenville	1928	current	
PA 847	10	16	PA 913 in Broad Top City	PA 76 in Cassville	1928	1946	
PA 848	—	—	PA 915 in Wells Tannery	PA 913 in New Granada	1928	1946	
PA 848	6.664	10.725	PA 547 in Gibson	US 11 in New Milford	1961	current	Previously a segment of PA 371.
PA 849	24.779	39.878	PA 74 in Saville Township	US 22 / US 322 near Duncannon	1928	current	
PA 850	44.890	72.243	PA 35 in Tuscarora Township	US 11 / US 15 in Marysville	1929	current	
PA 851	—	—	Fawn Grove	PA 74 in Airville	1928	1937	Became part of an extended PA 124 (now PA 425).
PA 851	32.592	52.452	PA 516 in Codorus Township	PA 74 in Peach Bottom Township	1937	current	Extended west from Railroad in 1966.
PA 852	12	19	PA 73 in Pleasantville	PA 100 near Clayton	1928	1946	
PA 853	5	8.0	PA 241 in Campbelltown	PA 72 in Cornwall	1928	1946	Became part of an extended PA 117.
PA 854	20	32	PA 861 in Leatherwood	US 322 near Elk City	1928	1984	
PA 855	6	9.7	Mars	PA 68 in Evans City	1928	1946	
PA 856	20	32	PA 65 in Freedom	PA 65 in Emsworth	1928	1977	
PA 857	—	—	US 19 in Pittsburgh	PA 51 in Rochester	1928	1935	Became part of PA 88, now PA 65.
PA 857	11.047	17.778	West Virginia state line in Springhill Township	US 119 / PA 43 in Uniontown	1967	current	
PA 858	16.465	26.498	PA 706 in Rush Township	New York state line in Little Meadows	1928	current	
PA 859	6	9.7	PA 487 in Le Raysville	PA 858 in Middletown Center	1928	1946	
PA 860	3	4.8	PA 36 in Tylersburg	PA 36 in Frills Corners	1928	1946	Now a segment of PA 36.
PA 861	11.67	18.78	PA 68 in Rimersburg	PA 66 in New Bethlehem	1928	current	
PA 862	7	11	Templeton	PA 28 / PA 66 in Goheenville	1928	1946	
PA 863	—	—	US 62 near Raymilton	near Raymilton	1928	1946	
PA 863	13.988	22.512	US 222 in Upper Macungie Township	PA 143 in Lynnport	1962	current	
PA 864	13.11	21.10	PA 87 in Upper Fairfield Township	US 220 in Picture Rocks	1928	current	
PA 865	19.1	30.7	I-99 / US 220 in Bellwood	PA 53 in Coalport	1928	current	
PA 866	22.435	36.106	PA 36 in Woodbury	US 22 in Frankstown Township	1928	current	
PA 867	12.2	19.6	PA 869 in South Woodbury Township	PA 36 / PA 164 near Roaring Spring	1928	current	
PA 868	—	—	PA 867 in Bakers Summit	PA 866 in Martinsburg	1928	1946	
PA 868	5.23	8.42	PA 36 in South Woodbury Township	PA 867 in Bloomfield Township	1946	current	One segment transferred to PA 36 in the 1970s.
PA 869	32.776	52.748	US 219 in St. Michael	PA 36 in South Woodbury Township	1928	current	
PA 871	4	6.4	PA 56 in Springmeadow	PA 869 in Osterburg	1928	1946	
PA 872	39.974	64.332	PA 120 in Grove Township	US 6 / PA 44 in Coudersport	1928	current	Extended north from Wharton in 1935.
PA 873	—	—	US 120 (now PA 120) near Renovo	Cross Fork	1928	1935	Became part of an extended PA 144.
PA 873	8.860	14.259	PA 309 in Schnecksville	PA 248 in Lehigh Township	1966	current	
PA 875	1	1.6	PA 44 / PA 54 near Turbotville	Comly	1928	1946	
PA 876	5	8.0	PA 54 in Washingtonville	PA 44 near Strawberry Ridge	1928	1946	
PA 877	3	4.8	PA 53 near Ursina	Humbert	1928	1946	
PA 879	43	69	US 219 / PA 729 in Grampian	PA 144 in Snow Shoe Township	1928	current	Extended west from Karthaus to Clearfield in 1935.
PA 880	24.957	40.164	PA 192 in Miles Township	PA 44 in Limestone Township	1928	current	Segment west of Loganton transferred to PA 477 in 1967.
PA 881	5	8.0	PA 48 in Versailles	US 30 in East Pittsburgh	1928	1946	A small portion became part of rerouted PA 148.
PA 882	4	6.4	PA 886 in Lovedale	PA 48 in Boston	1928	1946	
PA 883	3	4.8	PA 48 near Boston	PA 48 in Boston	1928	1932	
PA 884	6	9.7	PA 31 near Mustard	PA 51 in Elizabeth	1928	1946	
PA 885	14	23	PA 837 in Clairton	I-579 in Pittsburgh	1928	current	
PA 886	2	3.2	PA 884 in Elizabeth	PA 48 near Lovedale	1928	1946	
PA 888	3	4.8	Glen Iron	PA 45 near Laurelton	1928	1946	Became part of an extended PA 235.
PA 889	3	4.8	PA 45 near Vicksburg	Mazeppa	1928	1946	
PA 890	9.003	14.489	PA 225 in Zerbe Township	PA 61 in Upper Augusta Township	1928	current	
PA 891	12	19	PA 125 near Pitman	US 122 in Ashland	1928	1946	
PA 891	—	—	US 13 in Chester	Delaware state line	1935	1946	
PA 892	3	4.8	PA 987 in Schoenersville	PA 145 in Howertown	1928	1946	
PA 893	28	45	PA 44 in Waterville	PA 84 / PA 414 in Morris	1928	1955	Became part of an extended PA 414.
PA 894	7	11	US 22 in Paxtonia	PA 443 near Pikestown	1928	1946	
PA 895	47.374	76.241	PA 443 in Pine Grove	PA 248 in Bowmanstown	1928	current	
PA 896	33.722	54.270	MD 896 at Maryland state line in London Britain Township	PA 340 in Smoketown	1928	current	
PA 897	41.678	67.074	US 30 in Gap	US 422 in Lebanon	1928	current	
PA 898	4	6.4	US 222 in Gouglersville	US 222 in Shillington	1928	1946	
PA 899	10.794	17.371	PA 36 in Barnett Township	PA 66 in Jenks Township	1928	current	
PA 900	6	9.7	US 222 in Loretto	PA 36 in Chest Springs	1928	1929	
PA 901	26.370	42.438	PA 61 in Coal Township	PA 183 in Cressona	1928	current	
PA 902	11.662	18.768	US 209 in Lansford	PA 443 in Lehighton	1928	current	
PA 903	17.733	28.538	US 209 in Jim Thorpe	PA 115 in Tunkhannock Township	1928	current	
PA 904	5	8.0	Kunkletown	US 209 in Kresgeville	1928	1946	
PA 905	7	11	PA 31 in East Monongahela	PA 51 in Elizabeth	1928	1946	
PA 906	11	18	PA 201 in Washington Township	PA 136 in Forward Township	1928	current	
PA 907	6	9.7	PA 553 in Loretto	PA 36 in Chest Springs	1929	1946	
PA 908	16	26	PA 28 in Acmetonia	PA 28 near Birdville	1928	1946	
PA 909	6	9.7	PA 28 in Oakmont	PA 366 in Lower Burrell	1928	1946	
PA 910	19	31	I-79 in Franklin Park	Freeport Rd. (Old PA 28) in Harmar Township	1928	current	
PA 911	3	4.8	PA 28 in Sygen	PA 519 in Woodville	1928	1946	
PA 913	17.690	28.469	PA 26 in Saxton	PA 655 in Taylor Township	1928	current	
PA 914	—	—	PA 26 in Riddlesburg	PA 913 in Dudley	1928	1946	
PA 914	4.432	7.133	US 11 in Guilford Township	PA 316 in Guilford Township	1968	current	
PA 915	22.2	35.7	I-70 in Brush Creek Township	PA 26 in Hopewell	1928	current	
PA 916	5	8.0	PA 26 near Clearville	Mattie	1928	1946	
PA 917	—	—	PA 326 (now Main Road)	PA 326 (now Main Road) near Bedford	1928	1946	
PA 917	11.2	18.0	US 40 in North Bethlehem Township	PA 136 on the border of Fallowfield and Nottingham Townships	1964	current	
PA 918	—	—	Maryland state line	PA 326 in Chaneyville	1928	1936	Became part of rerouted PA 326.
PA 918	4	6.4	PA 326 in Chaneyville	PA 26 in Millers Corners	1936	1946	
PA 919	14	23	PA 125 near Weishample	US 122 in Fountain Springs	1928	1946	
PA 920	2	3.2	PA 24 near Cly	Goldsboro	1928	1946	Restored as part of PA 262 in 1961.
PA 921	9.831	15.821	PA 74 in Dover	PA 24 in Mount Wolf	1928	current	
PA 922	3	4.8	Conestoga	PA 324 in New Danville	1928	1946	Extended in 1941.
PA 923	4	6.4	PA 74 / PA 851 in Airville	PA 124 in York Furnace	1928	1932	
PA 924	22.234	35.782	PA 61 in Frackville	PA 309 in Hazleton	1928	current	
PA 925	15	24	US 122 in Bohrmans Mill	PA 29 in South Tamaqua	1928	1946	Now a segment of PA 443.
PA 926	26.176	42.126	PA 10 in Upper Oxford Township	PA 3 in Willistown Township	1928	current	
PA 927	2	3.2	PA 252 in Rose Tree	PA 320 in Marple	1928	1947	
PA 928	11.42	18.38	Maryland state line in Thompson Township	US 522 in Ayr Township	1928	current	Formerly a segment of US 622.
PA 929	4	6.4	US 522 / PA 235 in Beaver Springs	Troxelville	1928	1946	Became part of an extended PA 235.
PA 930	—	—	PA 18 in West Pittsburg	PA 18 in New Castle	1928	1937	Became part of rerouted PA 168.
PA 930	25	40	PA 51 in Stoops Ferry	PA 168 in Ohioville	1937	1946	
PA 931	6	9.7	PA 18 in Frankfort Springs	US 30 near Clinton	1928	1946	
PA 932	6	9.7	US 422 in New Bedford	Ohio state line in Shenango Township	1928	1985	
PA 933	17	27	US 22 in Mundys Corner	US 219 in Northern Cambria	1928	1967	Became part of an extended PA 271.
PA 934	10.873	17.498	US 322 / PA 241 in South Annville Township	I-81 in Fort Indiantown Gap	1928	current	
PA 935	4	6.4	Milbach	US 422 in Millardsville	1928	1946	
PA 936	1	1.6	Lorane	US 422 near Lorane	1928	1946	
PA 937	2	3.2	Stoverstown	PA 616 in New Salem	1928	1946	
PA 938	5	8.0	PA 87 near Canton	PA 154 in Lincoln Falls	1928	1936	Became part of a rerouted PA 154.
PA 938	5	8.0	PA 87 near Hillsgrove	PA 154 in Lincoln Falls	1936	1946	
PA 940	43.208	69.537	PA 309 in Hazleton	PA 191 in Paradise Valley	1928	current	Extended east from Blakeslee to Swiftwater in 1935; east end relocated to Paradise Valley in 1964.
PA 941	3	4.8	PA 14 in Cedarledge	Gleason	1928	1941	Became part of an extended PA 414.
PA 942	7	11	Ellentown	PA 154 in Grover	1928	1946	
PA 943	3	4.8	Calvert	PA 14 near Gray	1928	1955	
PA 944	30.869	49.679	PA 233 in Lower Mifflin Township	US 11 / US 15 in East Pennsboro Township	1928	current	Extended southwest from PA 233 in 1937; section from Roxbury to US 30 cancelled in 1947; section from Lower Mifflin Township to Roxbury became part of an extended PA 997 in 1964.
PA 945	6	9.7	PA 402 in Minisink Hills	US 209 in Coolbaughs	1928	1946	
PA 946	18.226	29.332	PA 248 in Berlinsville	PA 191 in Newburg	1928	current	
PA 948	38.5	62.0	PA 255 in Fox Township	PA 666 in Sheffield Township	1928	current	
PA 949	44.9	72.3	PA 28 in Summerville	PA 948 in Ridgway	1928	current	
PA 950	6.63	10.67	US 322 in Reynoldsville	PA 830 in Falls Creek	1928	current	
PA 951	10	16	US 322 in Prescottville	US 219 / US 322 in Luthersburg	1928	1946	
PA 952	10	16	PA 236 near Panic	US 119 in Stump Creek	1928	1984	
PA 953	4	6.4	Hamilton	PA 210 near Valier	1928	1946	
PA 954	35.321	56.844	PA 56 in Center Township	PA 210 in North Mahoning Township	1928	current	
PA 955	3.85	6.20	PA 5 in Lawrence Park	US 20 in Harborcreek	1928	current	
PA 956	—	—	PA 108 in New Castle	US 19 in Leesburg	1928	1937	Now PA 168.
PA 956	10.986	17.680	US 19 in Scott Township	PA 158 / PA 208 in New Wilmington	1937	current	
PA 957	25.044	40.304	US 6 in Columbus Township	US 62 in Elk Township	1928	current	
PA 958	8.633	13.893	New York state line in Freehold Township	US 6 in Pittsfield Township	1928	current	
PA 959	8	13	PA 872 in Wharton	PA 607 in Austin	1928	1935	Became part of an extended PA 872.
PA 960	12	19	PA 660 in Thumptown	PA 660 in Wellsboro	1928	1955	
PA 961	10	16	PA 84 near Antrim	US 6 / PA 660 in Pitts	1928	1946	
PA 962	3	4.8	Silver Spring	US 6 in Milford	1928	1946	
PA 963	4	6.4	US 6 in Matamoras	Millrift	1928	1946	
PA 964	6	9.7	PA 285 in J. C. Haylett Corners	US 322 in Canal Center	1928	1966	
PA 965	—	—	Freedom Falls in Rockland Township	US 322 in Cranberry Township	1928	1936	Became part of an extended PA 257.
PA 965	11.552	18.591	US 62 in Jackson Township	US 62 in Frenchcreek Township	1936	current	
PA 966	11	18	US 322 / PA 66 in Clarion	PA 36 in Scotch Hill	1928	1969	
PA 967	1	1.6	Henderson	US 322 in Day	1928	1946	
PA 968	15	24	US 322 in Brookville	PA 949 in Green Briar	1928	1984	
PA 969	10.384	16.711	US 219 in Greenwood Township	PA 453 in Curwensville	1928	current	
PA 970	5.20	8.37	US 322 in Woodland	PA 879 in Shawville	1928	current	Segment south of US 322 decommissioned in 2002.
PA 971	15	24	US 220 in Altoona	PA 350 in Union Furnace	1928	1946	
PA 972	8	13	US 322 / PA 76 in Reedsville	PA 983 in Siglerville	1928	1946	
PA 973	27.3	43.9	PA 44 in Tomb	PA 87 in Loyalsock	1928	current	
PA 974	2	3.2	Near Allenwood	US 15 in Allenwood	1928	1929	Temporarily renumbered as PA 174, then recreated as PA 974 in 1938.
PA 974	2	3.2	Near Allenwood	US 15 in Allenwood	1938	1946	
PA 975	3	4.8	US 15 in White Deer	White Deer Furnace	1928	1946	
PA 976	4	6.4	Kelly Crossroads	US 15 in West Milton	1928	1946	
PA 977	1	1.6	US 15 in Lewisburg	Montandon	1928	1936	Replaced by rerouted PA 45.
PA 978	10	16	PA 50 in South Fayette Township	US 22 / US 30 in North Fayette Township	1928	current	
PA 979	4	6.4	PA 980 near McDonald	PA 978 near Imperial	1928	1946	
PA 980	17	27	PA 519 in South Strabane Township	US 22 in North Fayette Township	1928	current	
PA 981	49	79	PA 51 in Rostraver Township	PA 819 in Bell Township	1928	current	
PA 982	33	53	US 119 in Bullskin Township	US 22 / US 119 in Derry Township	1928	current	
PA 983	4	6.4	US 322 in Milroy	PA 972 in Siglerville	1930	1946	
PA 984	5	8.0	Royer	PA 203 in Williamsburg	1928	1932	Became part of an extended PA 866.
PA 985	4	6.4	US 22 in Huntingdon	PA 545 (now PA 26) near Donation	1928	1946	
PA 985	20.95	33.72	PA 601 in Lincoln Township	PA 403 near Ferndale	1980	current	
PA 986	2	3.2	US 22 / US 522 near Newton Hamilton	PA 103 in Newton Hamilton	1928	1946	
PA 987	—	—	US 611 in Portland	New Jersey border	1928	1935	Became part of US 46.
PA 987	10.351	16.658	US 22 in Bethlehem	PA 946 in Klecknersville	1940	current	
PA 989	15.10	24.30	PA 65 in Ambridge	PA 68 in New Sewickley Township	1928	current	
PA 990	0.3	0.48	PA 881 in North Versailles	US 30 in North Versailles	1928	1946	The shortest known state route in Pennsylvania history until 2011; supplanted by PA 299.
PA 991	2	3.2	PA 881 in North Versailles	US 30 in East McKeesport	1928	1946	Became part of PA 148.
PA 992	4	6.4	US 30 in Adamsburg	PA 130 in Penn Township	1928	1946	
PA 993	14.4	23.2	PA 130 in Trafford	Bus. PA 66 in Hempfield Township	1928	current	
PA 994	27.497	44.252	PA 26 in Entriken	US 522 in Orbisonia	1928	current	
PA 995	19.557	31.474	PA 75 near Mercersburg	US 30 near Chambersburg	1928	current	Extended southwest from Upton in 1937.
PA 996	3	4.8	US 30 in Guilford Hills	PA 997 in Scotland	1928	1946	
PA 997	48.966	78.803	MD 64 at Maryland state line near Waynesboro	PA 233 in McCrea	1928	current	Extended south from Waynesboro in 1937.
PA 998	4	6.4	US 30 in Paradise Township	PA 234 in Paradise Township	1928	1946	
PA 999	9.445	15.200	PA 441 in Manor Township	PA 462 in Lancaster	1928	current	
Former; Proposed and unbuilt

=== State routes with a different route number ===
- PA 86 - assigned as SR 0886 (SR 0086 currently assigned to I-86)
- PA 97 (Erie County) - assigned as SR 0019 and SR 0197 (to differentiate from the other PA 97 in Adams County)
- PA 99 - assigned as SR 0699 (never designated as a PA route; SR 0099 currently assigned to I-99)
- PA 283 - assigned as SR 0300 (SR 0283 currently assigned to I-283)
- PA 380 - assigned as SR 0400 (SR 0380 currently assigned to I-380)

== See also ==
- Keystone Marker
- Former state routes in Pennsylvania
- New York State Route 17, which briefly dips into Pennsylvania in South Waverly, but is signed and maintained by New York
