= Pennsylvania Route 436 =

State highway in Jefferson County, Pennsylvania, US

Pennsylvania Route 436

Route information
- Maintained by PennDOT
- Length: 1.969 mi (3.169 km)
- Existed: 1928–present

Major junctions
- South end: US 119 near Punxsutawney
- North end: PA 36 in Punxsutawney

Location
- Country: United States
- State: Pennsylvania
- Counties: Jefferson

Highway system
- Pennsylvania State Route System; Interstate; US; State; Scenic; Legislative
← PA 435	→ PA 437

Pennsylvania Route 436 (PA 436) is a 1.969-mile-long (3.169 km) state highway located in Jefferson County in Pennsylvania. The southern terminus is at U.S. Route 119 (US 119) near Punxsutawney. The northern terminus is at PA 36 in Punxsutawney. PA 436 was assigned in the 1928 numbering of roads in Pennsylvania and not paved until 1932. The road's other lone major intersection on PA 436 is for State Route 3010 (SR 3010). The route is highly elevated for most of its length, reaching as high as 1,500 feet (460 m).

PA 436 is the second-shortest signed route in Pennsylvania, and third-shortest overall after Pennsylvania Route 179 and Pennsylvania Route 299. However, since PA 179 is a multi-state route, PA 436 is the shortest single-state route.

== Route description ==
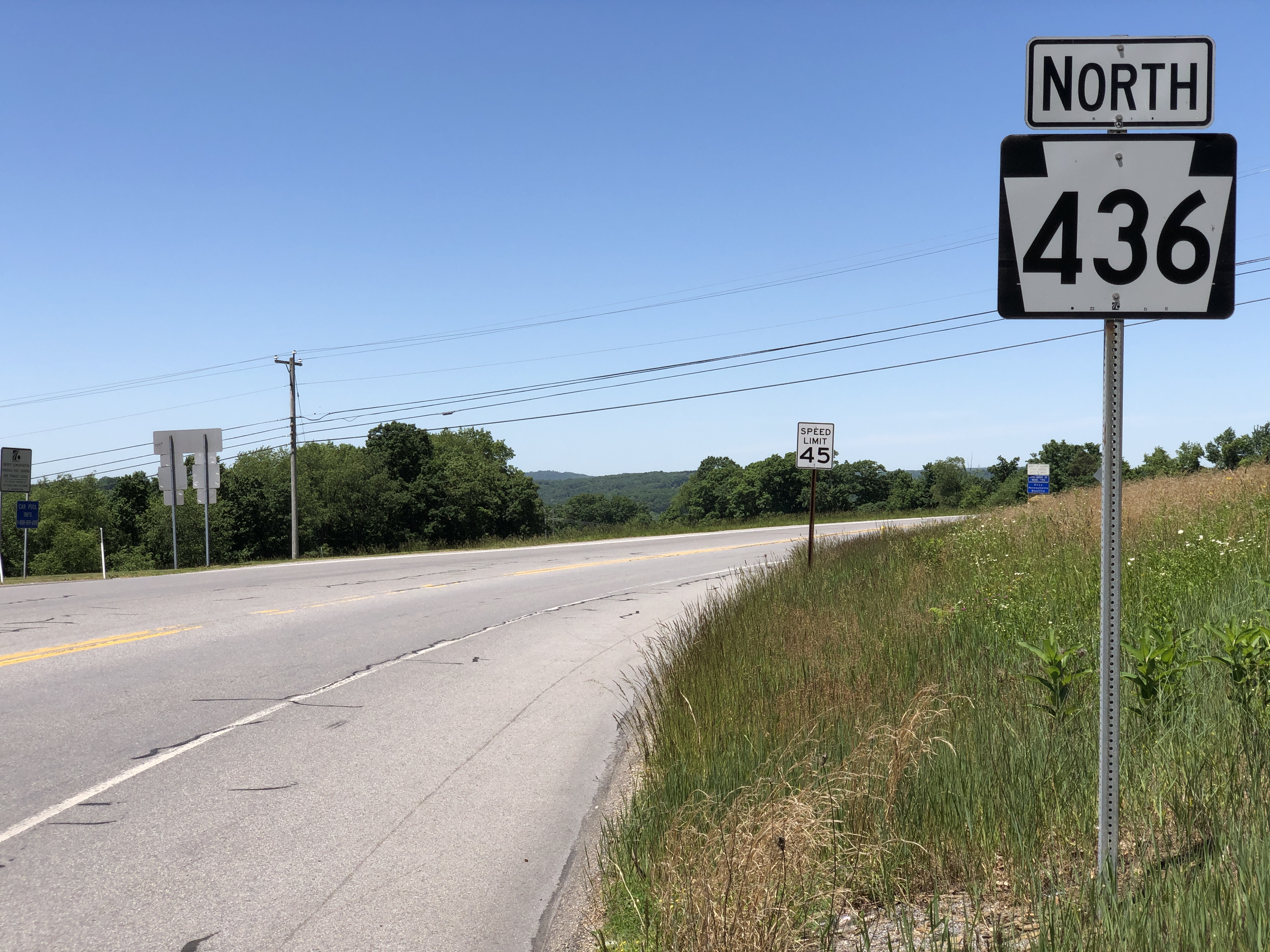
PA 436 northbound past US 119 near Punxsutawney

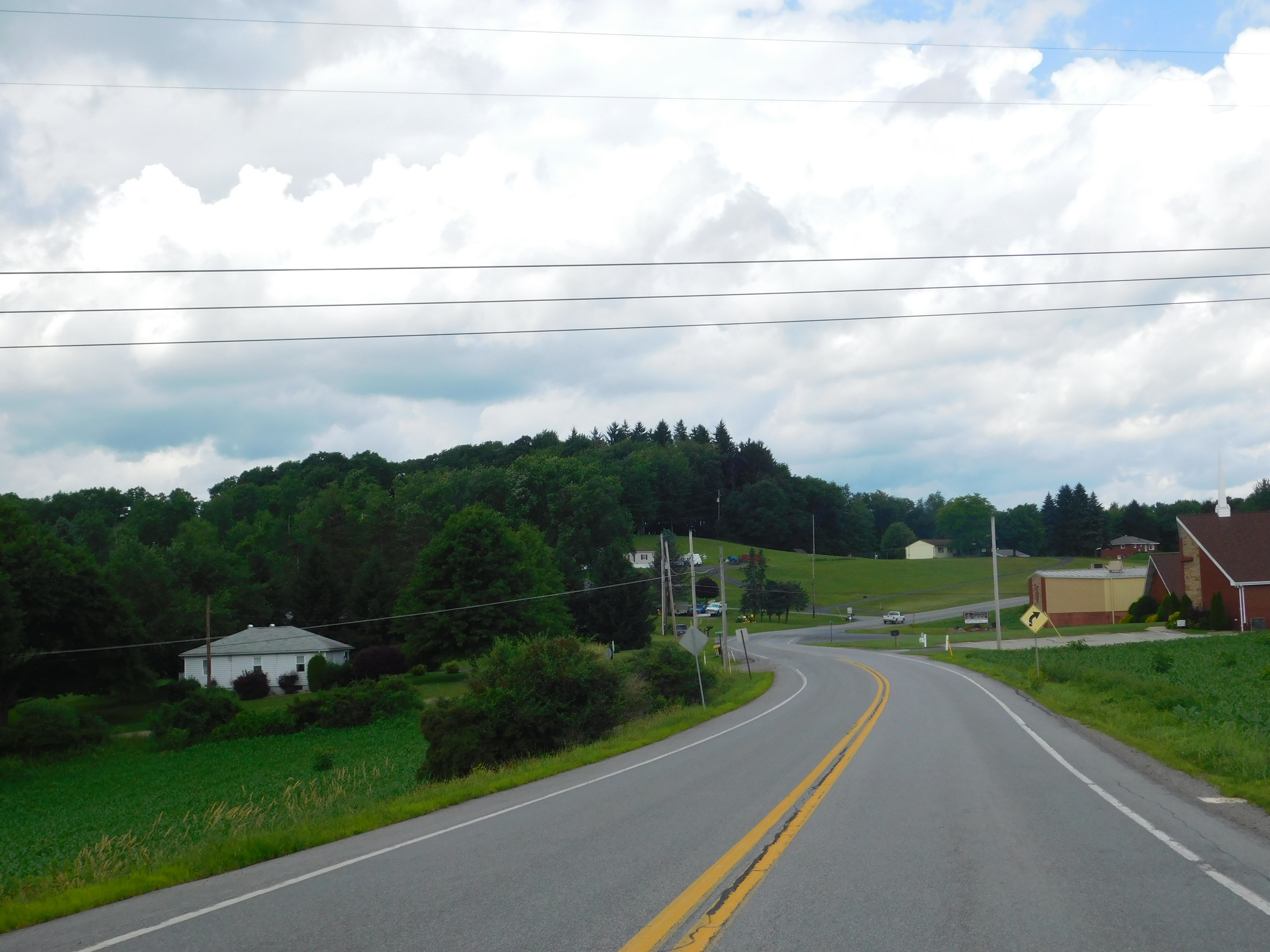
PA 436 in Punxsutawney

PA 436 begins at an intersection with US 119 in Punxsutawney. A park and ride lot is located at the southwest corner of the intersection. The elevation of the highway is at about 1,500 feet (460 m) high. The route goes northward, parallelling US 119 for most of its length. The highway intersects with SR 3010 (Sportsburg Road), which heads westward and ends in the small village of Sportsburg. PA 436 continues northward, intersecting with local roads and beginning to go down in elevation. There it enters downtown Punxsutawney and terminates at an intersection with PA 36 (North Main Street).

== History ==
PA 436 was signed along its current routing in 1928, like most routes in Pennsylvania. The route then was not paved and this did not occur for another four years, when the road was paved in 1932.

== Major intersections ==
The entire route is in Jefferson County.

Location	mi	km	Destinations	Notes
Young Township	0.000	0.000	US 119 – Indiana	Southern terminus
Punxsutawney	1.969	3.169	PA 36 – Brookville	Northern terminus
1.000 mi = 1.609 km; 1.000 km = 0.621 mi
