= Henderson Township, Pennsylvania =

Henderson Township is the name of some places in the U.S. state of Pennsylvania:

- Henderson Township, Huntingdon County, Pennsylvania
- Henderson Township, Jefferson County, Pennsylvania
