= Pennsylvania Route 326 =

State highway in Bedford County, Pennsylvania, US

Pennsylvania Route 326

Route information
- Maintained by PennDOT
- Length: 23.883 mi (38.436 km)

Major junctions
- South end: Black Valley Road / Gap Road NE at Maryland state line near Flintstone, MD
- North end: US 30 near Bedford

Location
- Country: United States
- State: Pennsylvania
- Counties: Bedford

Highway system
- Pennsylvania State Route System; Interstate; US; State; Scenic; Legislative
← PA 325	→ PA 327

Pennsylvania Route 326 (PA 326) is a 24-mile-long (39 km) state highway located in Bedford County, Pennsylvania. The southern terminus is at the Maryland state line near Flintstone, Maryland. The northern terminus is at U.S. Route 30 (US 30) east of Bedford.

== Route description ==
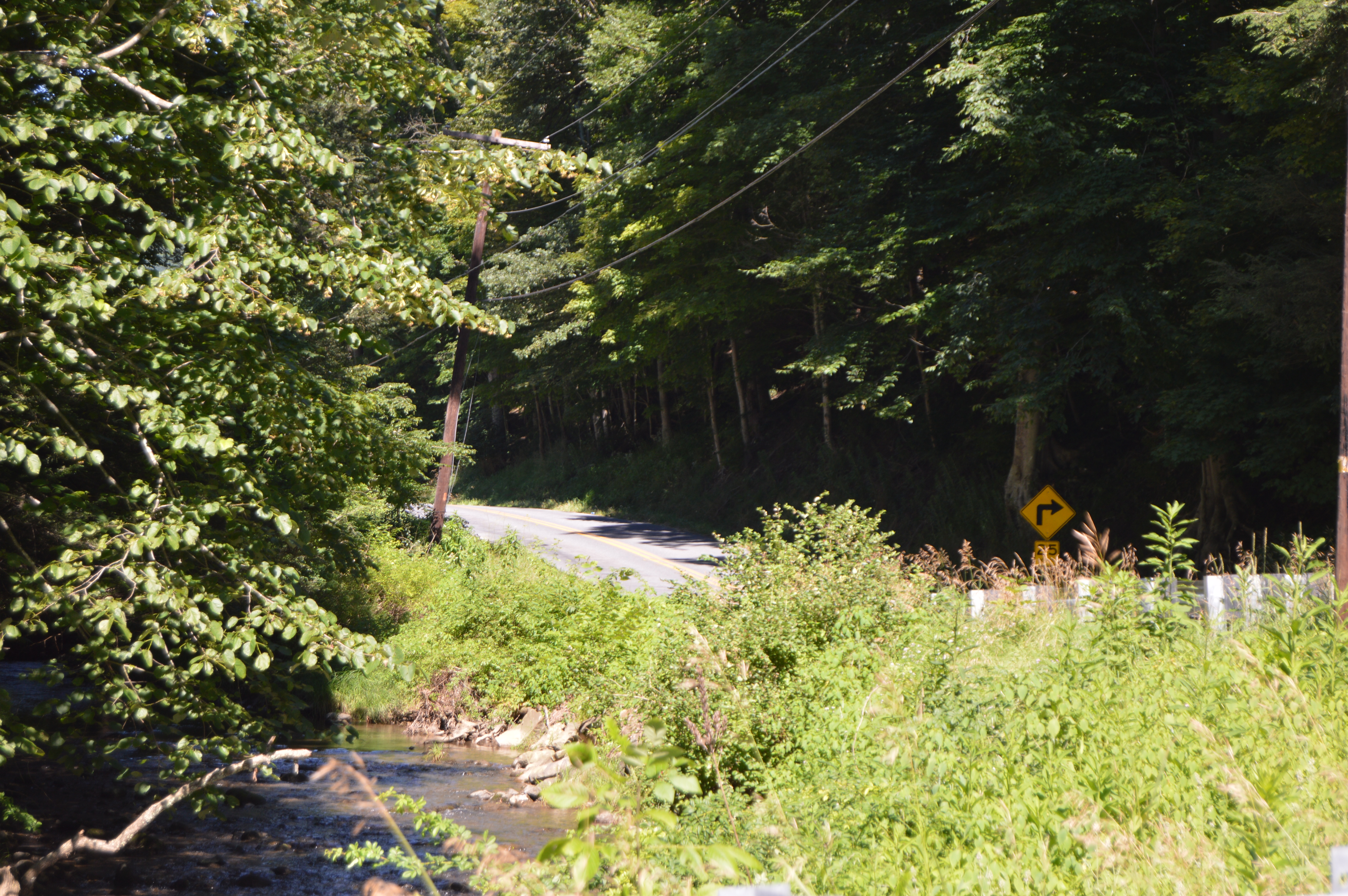
PA 326 at Black Valley Gap in Warrior Ridge

PA 326 begins at the Maryland border in Southampton Township, where the road connects to Black Valley Road and Gap Road NE south of the state line. From this point, the route heads north on two-lane undivided South Black Valley Road, passing through an agricultural valley with some woods and homes. The road curves more to the northeast, turning east onto Chaneysville Road and passing through a gap in Warrior Ridge. PA 326 reaches the community of Hewitt, at which point the road winds north through farmland and woodland in another narrow valley. The route continues through the valley for several miles, curving east before turning north onto Chaneysville Cove Road near the community of Chaneysville. The road curves northwest and passes through another gap in warrior ridge, at which point it passes through a portion of the Buchanan State Forest. PA 326 turns north onto Black Valley Road and runs through forested areas with some farms. The route bears west onto Main Road, turning west into forests and crossing Tussey Mountain. After a bend to the north, the road heads into Monroe Township and passes through more of the Buchanan State Forest.

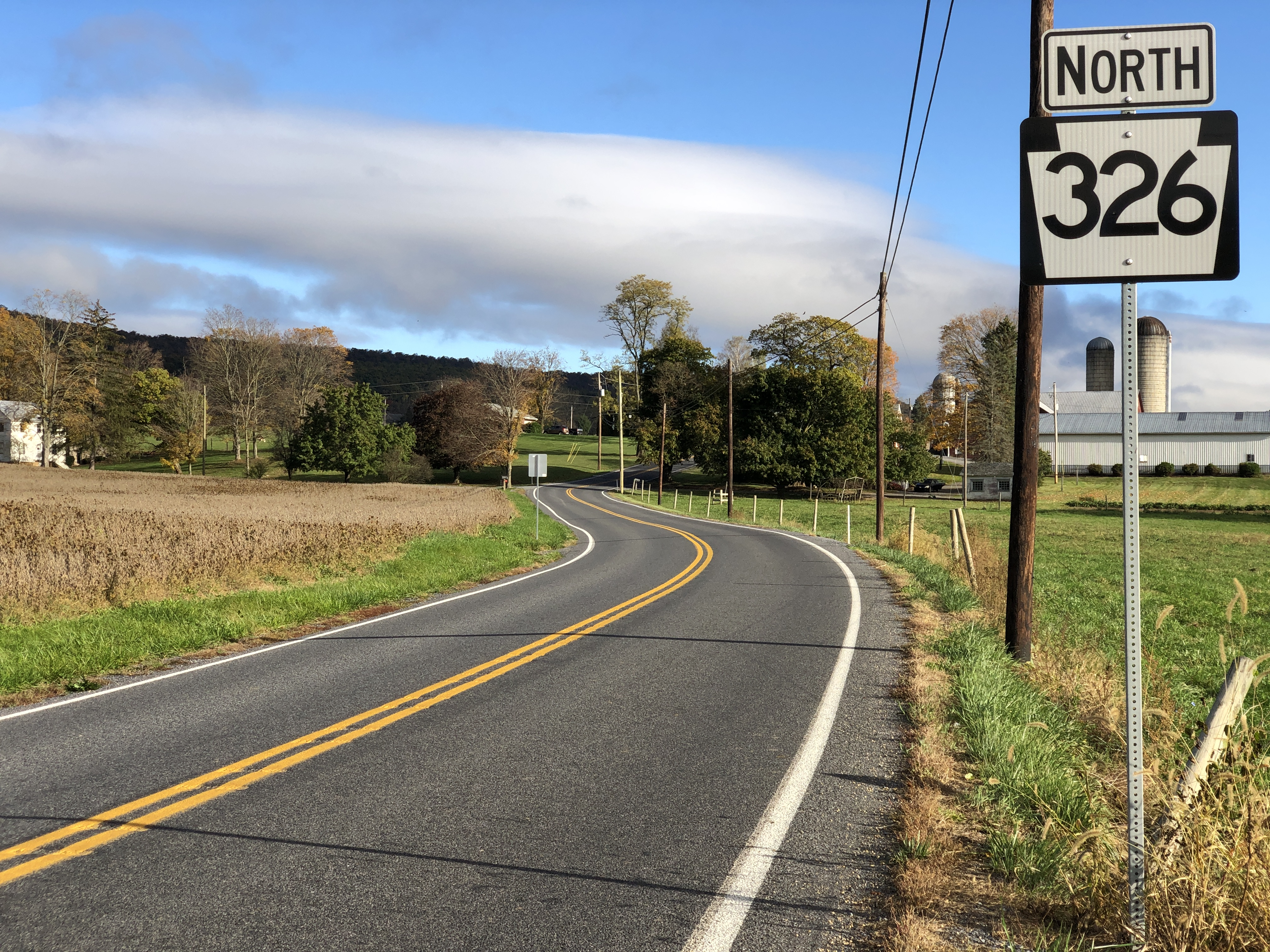
PA 326 northbound in Colerain Township

PA 326 enters Colerain Township and leaves the state forest, curving to the northwest. The road heads into an agricultural valley and turns north, crossing into the borough of Rainsburg. Here, the route passes several homes. PA 326 heads back into Colerain Township and enters open agricultural areas, passing through Beegletown and Charlesville. After the latter, the route turns north onto Egolf Road, heading through more agricultural areas with some woods and homes. The surroundings become more forested before the road passes through more farmland with a few woods and residences, bending to the north-northeast. PA 326 crosses into Snake Spring Township, where it makes a turn northwest to continue along Egolf Road. The road passes through wooded areas with a few homes, running to the southwest of the Raystown Branch Juniata River. PA 326 reaches its northern terminus at an intersection with US 30 east of the borough of Bedford.

== Major intersections ==
The entire route is in Bedford County.

Location	mi	km	Destinations	Notes
Southampton Township	0.000	0.000	Black Valley Road / Gap Road NE – Flintstone	Maryland border; southern terminus
Snake Spring Township	23.883	38.436	US 30 (Lincoln Highway) – Bedford, Everett	Northern terminus
1.000 mi = 1.609 km; 1.000 km = 0.621 mi
