= Pennsylvania Route 97 =

Pennsylvania Route 97 can refer to either of two state highways in Pennsylvania that share the same number, but were never connected:

- Pennsylvania Route 97 (Adams County)
- Pennsylvania Route 97 (Erie County)

Browse numbered routes
← PA 96	PA	→ PA 98
