= Pennsylvania Route 55 =

Pennsylvania Route 55 was an American state highway split into two segments in Pennsylvania. The two segments, signed in 1927, never connected with one another.

- The western segment, deleted in 1928, became part of then-Pennsylvania Route 65, now U.S. Route 62.
- The eastern segment, deleted in 1930, became part of then-U.S. Route 120, now Pennsylvania Route 120.

Browse numbered routes
← PA 54	PA	→ PA 56
