= Desire, Pennsylvania =

- Unincorporated community
- Location within Pennsylvania Location within the United States
- Coordinates: 41°01′31″N 78°53′25″W
- Country: United States
- State: Pennsylvania
- County: Jefferson
- Township: Henderson
- Elevation: 1,519 ft (463 m)
- Time zone: UTC-5 (Eastern (EST))
  - Summer (DST): UTC-4 (EDT)
- GNIS feature ID: 1173179

Desire is an unincorporated community in Henderson Township in Jefferson County, Pennsylvania, United States.

A post office was established at Desire in 1898, and remained in operation until 1923. The origin of the name "Desire" is obscure. Journalist William A. White visited Desire in 1953 and wrote "there is nothing sensational about the name Desire". White described the community as having a few houses, a gas station, and a post office named Desire.
