= Exchange, Pennsylvania =

Unincorporated community in Pennsylvania, U.S.

Coordinates: 41.1131°N 76.6840°W

Exchange is an unincorporated community in Montour County, Pennsylvania.

== History ==
A post office called Exchange was established in 1857, and remained in operation until 1935. The community was named for the fact carriage horses were "exchanged" at the site, which was formerly located on a turnpike.
