= Stump Creek, Pennsylvania =

- Unincorporated community
- Location within Pennsylvania Location within the United States
- Coordinates: 41°00′45″N 78°50′14″W
- Country: United States
- State: Pennsylvania
- County: Jefferson
- Township: Henderson
- Elevation: 1,463 ft (446 m)
- Time zone: UTC-5 (Eastern (EST))
  - Summer (DST): UTC-4 (EDT)
- ZIP code: 15863
- Area code: 814
- GNIS feature ID: 1188902

Stump Creek is an unincorporated community in Jefferson County, Pennsylvania, United States. The community is located on U.S. Route 119, 2.7 miles (4.3 km) south of Sykesville. Stump Creek has a post office with ZIP code 15863.
