= Pennsylvania Route 299 =

State highway in Pennsylvania, US

Pennsylvania Route 299
- Powell Avenue
- PA 299 highlighted in red; the route prior to 2011 is in blue

Route information
- Maintained by PennDOT
- Length: 0.052 mi (84 m)
- Existed: 1930–present
- History: Signage removed in 2011

Major junctions
- South end: Powell Avenue in Millcreek Township
- North end: Powell Avenue in Millcreek Township

Location
- Country: United States
- State: Pennsylvania
- Counties: Erie

Highway system
- Pennsylvania State Route System; Interstate; US; State; Scenic; Legislative
← PA 297	→ PA 301

Pennsylvania Route 299 (PA 299) is a 0.05-mile-long (260 ft; 80 m) state highway located in Erie County in Pennsylvania. The route is the designation for the Staff Sergeant Jeremy R. Horton Memorial Bridge that carries Powell Avenue over two railroad lines in Millcreek Township. PA 299 was designated in 1930 between US 20 and PA 99, which is now PA 5 Alternate (PA 5 Alt.), running along Powell Avenue. In 2006, the current bridge over the railroad tracks was built. In 2011, all of PA 299 was decommissioned except for the Staff Sergeant Jeremy R. Horton Memorial Bridge, and is no longer signed as a traffic route. The section of Powell Avenue north of the bridge was realigned in 2012 as a result of runway expansion at Erie International Airport.

== Route description ==
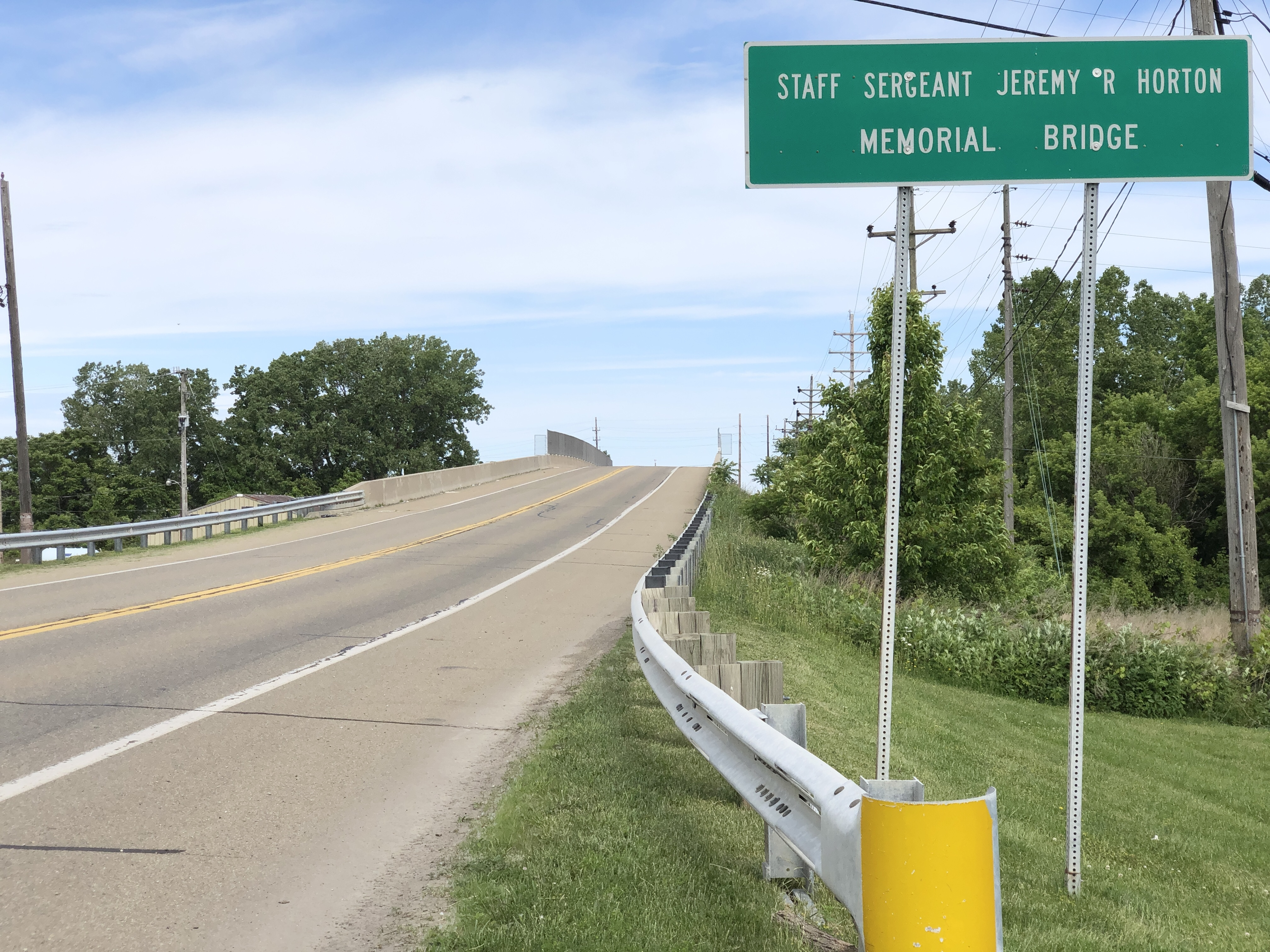
PA 299 northbound past its southern terminus in Millcreek Township

PA 299 begins at the south end of the Staff Sergeant Jeremy R. Horton Memorial Bridge in Millcreek Township, where the road continues south as township-maintained Powell Avenue to an intersection with US 20. The bridge runs past industrial areas before carrying the route over Norfolk Southern's Lake Erie District railroad line followed by CSX's Erie West Subdivision railroad line. At the north end of the bridge, the PA 299 designation ends and Powell Avenue continues north as a township-maintained road to Erie International Airport, where the road bypasses the runway to the east as 20th Street and Marshall Drive. Past the runway, Powell Avenue resumes at Oxer Road and intersects PA 5 (West 12th Street) and PA 5 Alt. (West Lake Road) before continuing several more blocks to the Lake Erie shoreline.

== History ==
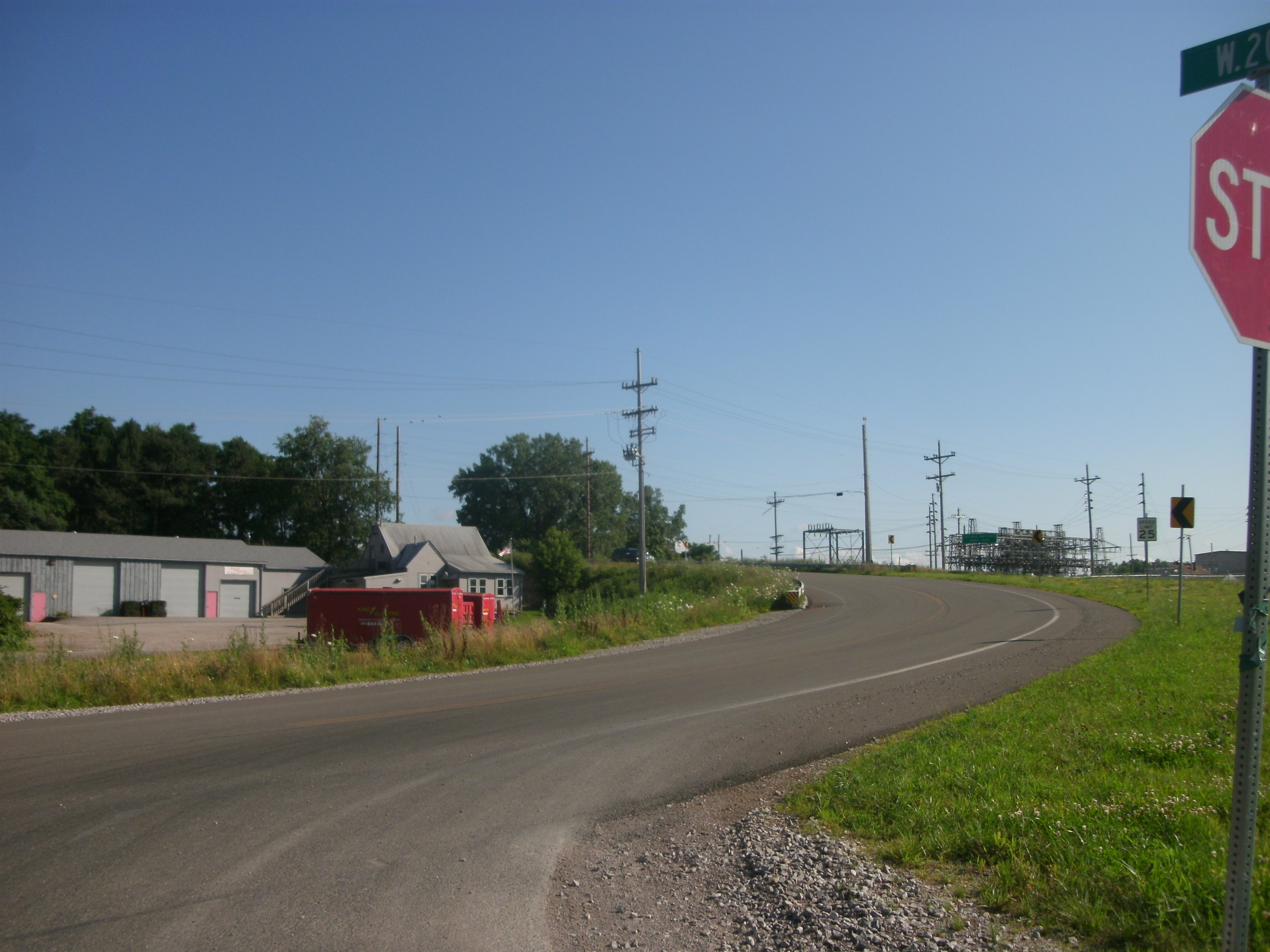
Approaching PA 299's current alignment, the Horton Bridge, as seen from 20th Street along the former northern extension of PA 299

When Pennsylvania legislated routes in 1911, what would become PA 299 was not given a number. PA 299 was established in 1930 as a spur of PA 99 running south to US 20 on Powell Avenue. PA 99 ran on what is now PA 5 Alternate. Upon designation, the entire length of PA 299 was paved. In 2006, the Powell Avenue Bridge was replaced with the Staff Sergeant Jeremy R. Horton Memorial Bridge. In 2011, the entire length of PA 299 with the exception of the Staff Sergeant Jeremy R. Horton Memorial Bridge was removed from the state highway system. Between 2010 and 2012, the runway at Erie International Airport was expanded, forcing Powell Avenue to be relocated around it.

== Major intersections ==
The entire route is in Millcreek Township, Erie County.

mi	km	Destinations	Notes
0.000	0.000	Powell Avenue south	Southern terminus
0.052	0.084	Powell Avenue north	Northern terminus
1.000 mi = 1.609 km; 1.000 km = 0.621 mi
