= Henderson Township, Jefferson County, Pennsylvania =

Township in Pennsylvania, US

Coordinates: 40°59′00″N 78°52′59″W

- Township
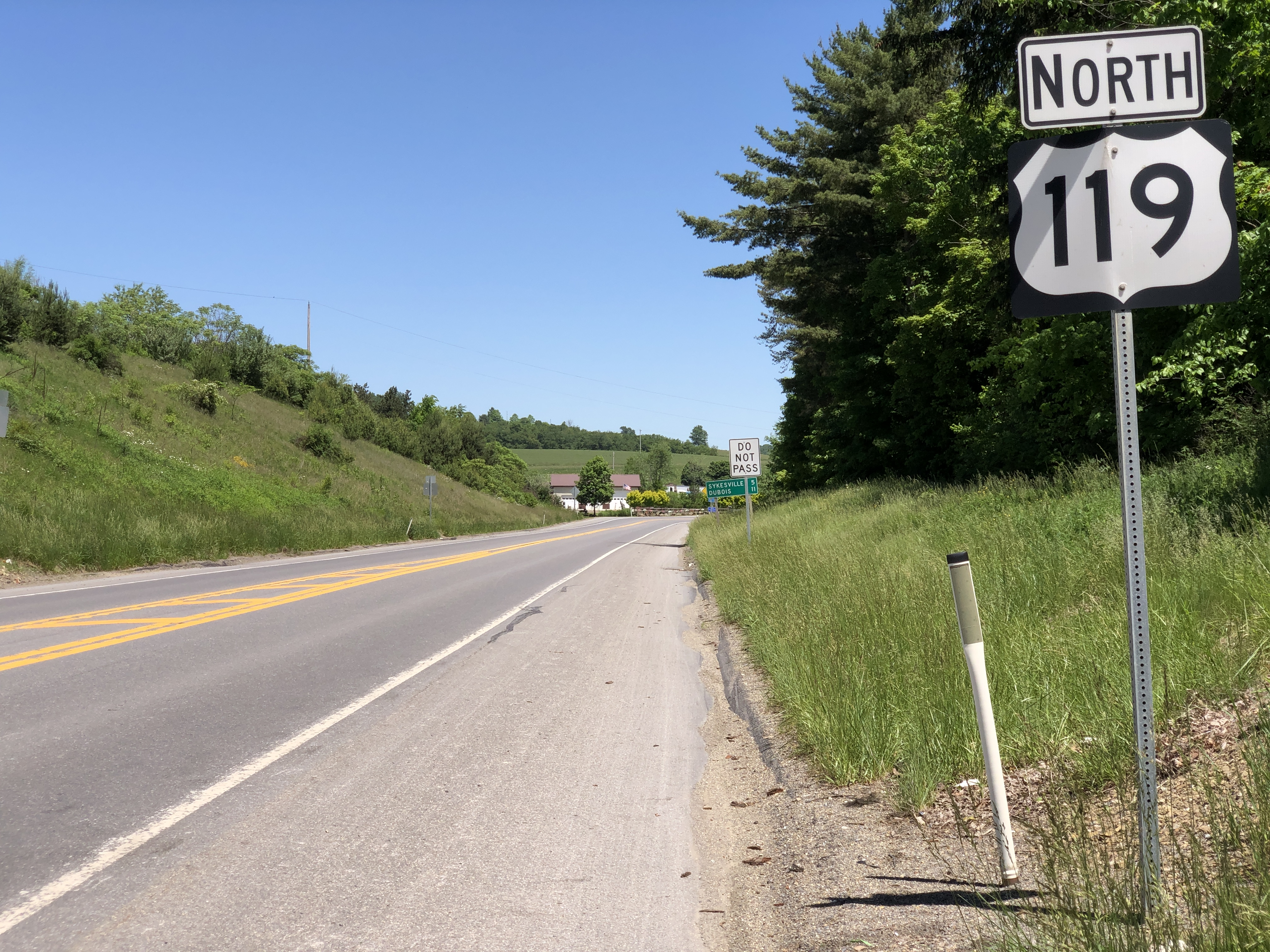
- US 119 in Henderson Township

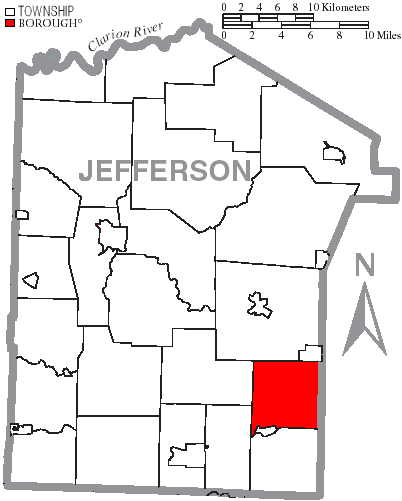
- Map of Jefferson County, Pennsylvania Highlighting Henderson Township

- Map of Jefferson County, Pennsylvania
- Country: United States
- State: Pennsylvania
- County: Jefferson
- Settled: 1829
- Incorporated: 1857

Area
  - Total: 22.00 sq mi (56.99 km^{2})
  - Land: 21.94 sq mi (56.83 km^{2})
  - Water: 0.062 sq mi (0.16 km^{2})

Population (2020)
  - Total: 1,941 ▲
  - Estimate (2023): 1,906
  - Density: 88.46/sq mi (34.15/km^{2})
- Time zone: UTC-5 (Eastern (EST))
  - Summer (DST): UTC-4 (EDT)
- FIPS code: 42-065-33816

Henderson Township is a township in Jefferson County, Pennsylvania, United States. The population was 1,941 at the 2020 census. It was named for Jefferson County Associate Judge Joseph Henderson.

== Geography ==
Henderson Township is in southeastern Jefferson County and is bordered to the east by Clearfield County. The township is bordered to the northeast by the borough of Sykesville and to the southwest by the borough of Big Run. Unincorporated communities in the township include Desire and Stump Creek.

According to the United States Census Bureau, Henderson Township has a total area of 22.0 square miles (57.0 km^{2}), of which 21.9 square miles (56.8 km^{2}) are land and 0.1 square miles (0.2 km^{2}), or 0.28%, are water. Mahoning Creek forms part of the southwest border of the township. Stump Creek, crosses the township from north to south to flow into Mahoning Creek. The entire township is part of the Allegheny River watershed.

== Demographics ==
Historical population
| Census | Pop. | Note | %± |
|---|---|---|---|
| 1860 | 627 | | — |
| 1870 | 884 | | 41.0% |
| 1880 | 872 | | −1.4% |
| 1890 | 1,024 | | 17.4% |
| 1900 | 1,041 | | 1.7% |
| 1910 | 1,316 | | 26.4% |
| 1920 | 1,273 | | −3.3% |
| 1930 | 1,527 | | 20.0% |
| 1940 | 1,784 | | 16.8% |
| 1950 | 1,521 | | −14.7% |
| 1960 | 1,177 | | −22.6% |
| 1970 | 1,006 | | −14.5% |
| 1990 | 1,376 | | — |
| 2000 | 1,727 | | 25.5% |
| 2010 | 1,816 | | 5.2% |
| 2020 | 1,941 | | 6.9% |
| 2023 (est.) | 1,906 | | −1.8% |
U.S. Decennial Census

As of the census of 2000, there were 1,727 people, 563 households, and 459 families residing in the township. The population density was 78.6 inhabitants per square mile (30.3/km^{2}). There were 604 housing units at an average density of 27.5 per square mile (10.6/km^{2}). The racial makeup of the township was 99.31% White, 0.06% African American, 0.29% Native American, 0.06% Pacific Islander, and 0.29% from two or more races. Hispanic or Latino of any race were 0.52% of the population.

There were 563 households, out of which 41.6% had children under the age of 18 living with them, 71.6% were married couples living together, 5.2% had a female householder with no husband present, and 18.3% were non-families. 16.3% of all households were made up of individuals, and 7.6% had someone living alone who was 65 years of age or older. The average household size was 3.07 and the average family size was 3.43.

In the township the population was spread out, with 32.6% under the age of 18, 10.0% from 18 to 24, 25.9% from 25 to 44, 20.4% from 45 to 64, and 11.2% who were 65 years of age or older. The median age was 31 years. For every 100 females, there were 107.8 males. For every 100 females age 18 and over, there were 105.3 males.

The median income for a household in the township was $31,625, and the median income for a family was $33,869. Males had a median income of $29,643 versus $20,119 for females. The per capita income for the township was $12,716. About 17.3% of families and 22.8% of the population were below the poverty line, including 35.1% of those under age 18 and 15.8% of those age 65 or over.
