= Pennsylvania House of Representatives, District 17 =

American legislative district

Pennsylvania's 17th State House of Representatives district
Representative
Timothy R. Bonner; R–Grove City
- Population (2022): 65,933

The 17th Pennsylvania House of Representatives District is located in western Pennsylvania and has been represented by Republican Timothy R. Bonner since 2023.

== District profile ==
The 17th District is located in Butler County and Mercer County and includes the following areas:

Butler County

- Allegheny Township
- Bruin
- Cherry Township
- Cherry Valley
- Concord Township
- Eau Claire
- Fairview
- Fairview Township
- Harrisville
- Karns City
- Marion Township
- Mercer Township
- Parker Township
- Petrolia
- Slippery Rock
- Slippery Rock Township
- Venango Township
- Washington Township

Mercer County

- Coolspring Township
- Deer Creek Township
- Delaware Township
- East Lackawannock Township
- Fairview Township
- Findley Township
- Fredonia
- French Creek
- Grove City
- Jackson Center
- Jackson Township
- Jefferson Township
- Lake Township
- Liberty Township
- Mercer
- Mill Creek Township
- New Lebanon
- New Vernon
- Otter Creek Township
- Perry Township
- Pine Township
- Salem Township
- Sandy Creek Township
- Sandy Lake
- Sandy Lake Township
- Sheakleyville
- Springfield Township
- Stoneboro
- Sugar Grove Township
- Wilmington Township
- Wolf Creek Township
- Worth Township

== Representatives ==
Representative	Party	Years	District home	Note
Prior to 1969, seats were apportioned by county.
Eugene F. Scanlon	Democrat	1969 – 1974		
Leonard E. Sweeney	Democrat	1975		Convicted of mail fraud and expelled on August 27, 1975
Robert P. Ravenstahl	Democrat	1975 – 1978		
Thomas J. Murphy, Jr.	Democrat	1979 – 1982		Moved to the 20th District
Robert D. Robbins	Republican	1983 – 1990	Greenville	Elected to the Pennsylvania Senate
David Orr King	Republican	1991 – 1996		
Rod E. Wilt	Republican	1997 – 2006		
Michele Brooks	Republican	2007 – 2014	Jamestown	
Parke Wentling	Republican	2015 – 2022	Greenville	Redistricted to 7th District
Timothy R. Bonner	Republican	2023 – present	Grove City	Redistricted from 8th District

== Recent election results ==
PA House election, 2024: Pennsylvania House, District 17
Party	Candidate	Votes	%
Republican	Tim Bonner (incumbent)	Unopposed	
Total votes		29,143	100.00
Republican hold			

PA House election, 2022: Pennsylvania House, District 17
Party	Candidate	Votes	%
Republican	Tim Bonner (incumbent)	Unopposed	
Total votes		22,001	100.00
Republican hold			

PA House election, 2020: Pennsylvania House, District 17
Party	Candidate	Votes	%
Republican	Parke Wentling (incumbent)	Unopposed	
Total votes		26,574	100.00
Republican hold			

PA House election, 2018: Pennsylvania House, District 17
Party	Candidate	Votes	%
Republican	Parke Wentling (incumbent)	Unopposed	
Total votes		17,434	100.00
Republican hold			

PA House election, 2016: Pennsylvania House, District 17
Party	Candidate	Votes	%
Republican	Parke Wentling (incumbent)	18,937	71.27
Democratic	Wayne Hanson	7,633	28.73
Total votes		26,570	100.00
Republican hold			

PA House election, 2014: Pennsylvania House, District 17
Party	Candidate	Votes	%
Republican	Parke Wentling	11,197	67.32
Democratic	Wayne Hanson	5,435	32.68
Total votes		16,632	100.00
Republican hold			

PA House election, 2012: Pennsylvania House, District 17
Party	Candidate	Votes	%
Republican	Michele Brooks (incumbent)	Unopposed	
Total votes		19,904	100.00
Republican hold			

PA House election, 2010: Pennsylvania House, District 17
Party	Candidate	Votes	%
Republican	Michele Brooks (incumbent)	Unopposed	
Total votes		15,563	100.00
Republican hold			
