= Lakeview School District (Mercer County, Pennsylvania) =

School district in Pennsylvania, USA

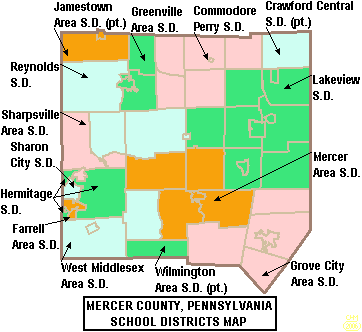

Address
- 2482 Mercer Street Stoneboro, Mercer County, Pennsylvania, 16153-2799; United States

District information
- Type: Public

Students and staff
- District mascot: Sailors

Other information
- Website: www.lakeview.k12.pa.us

The Lakeview School District is a small, rural public school district serving parts of Mercer County, Pennsylvania. The district encompasses multiple rural communities, including Fairview Township, New Vernon Township, New Lebanon, Mill Creek Township, Stoneboro, Lake Township, Sandy Lake, Sandy Lake Township, Jackson Township, Jackson Center, and Worth Township. Lakeview School District encompasses approximately 146 square miles (380 km^{2}). According to 2000 federal census data, Lakeview School District served a district population of 8,462. By 2010, the district's population increased to 8,604 people. In 2009, Lakeview School District residents' per capita income was $16,811, while the median family income was $40,063. The district is one of the 500 public school districts of Pennsylvania.

Lakeview School District operates Oakview Elementary School, Lakeview Middle School, and Lakeview High School. The District provides a full-day kindergarten and preschool.

== Extracurriculars ==
Lakeview School District offers a variety of clubs, activities and sports programs for middle school and high school students. The high school is a District 10 member of the Pennsylvania Interscholastic Athletic Association (PIAA).

=== Sports ===
The District funds:

Boys

- Baseball - AA
- Basketball- AA
- Cross Country - A
- Football - A (coop)
- Golf - AA
- Soccer - A
- Track and Field - AA
- Wrestling - AA

Girls

- Basketball - AAA
- Cheer - AAAAAA
- Cross Country - A
- Softball - AA
- Track and Field - AA
- Volleyball - AA

Junior High School Sports

Boys

- Basketball
- Cross Country
- Football
- Track and Field
- Wrestling

Girls

- Basketball
- Cross Country
- Track and Field
- Volleyball

According to PIAA directory January 2018
