= Commodore Perry School District =

School district in Pennsylvania

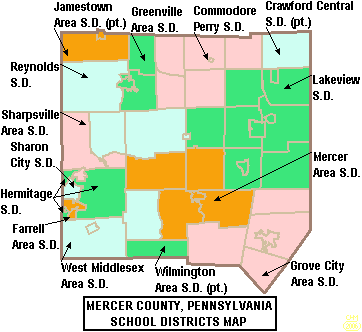
- Commodore Perry School District located in northern Mercer County

Address
- 3002 Perry Highway Mercer County, Pennsylvania, 16103-2628; United States

District information
- Type: Public

Other information
- Website: www.cppanthers.org

The Commodore Perry School District is a diminutive, rural public school district serving parts of Mercer County, Pennsylvania. The district encompasses the communities of Sheakleyville, Deer Creek Township, Sandy Creek Township, Salem Township, Otter Creek Township, and Perry Township. Commodore Perry School District encompasses approximately 74 square miles (190 km^{2}). According to 2000 federal census data, it served a resident population of 4,328. By 2010, the District's population was 4,232 people. In 2009 the Commodore Perry School District residents' per capita income was $16,448, while the median family income was $40,453.

Commodore Perry School District operates two small schools: Commodore Perry School, an elementary school; and Commodore Perry Junior Senior High School, a combined junior/senior high school. The district is named in honor of Commodore Oliver Hazard Perry, a U.S. naval officer and hero of the Battle of Lake Erie during the War of 1812.

== Extracurriculars ==
The district offers a variety of club activities and an extensive sports program. Activities offered include: Academic Decathlon, FBLA, Foreign Language, Panther Broadcasting, Yearbook, Band and Chorus. Sports offered include: Baseball, Basketball Boys Sr. High and Girls Sr. High, Basketball Boys Jr. High and Girls Jr. High, Soccer, and Volleyball.

=== Sports ===
The District funds:

Boys

- Baseball - AA
- Basketball- A
- Cross Country - A
- Soccer - AA
- Track and Field - AA
- Wrestling - AA

Girls

- Basketball - A
- Cross Country - A
- Softball - A
- Track and Field - AA
- Volleyball - A

Junior High School Sports

Boys

- Basketball
- Cross Country
- Wrestling

Girls

- Basketball
- Cross Country
- Volleyball

According to PIAA directory July 2013
