= Mill Creek Township, Pennsylvania =

Mill Creek Township is the name of some places in the U.S. state of Pennsylvania:

- Mill Creek Township, Lycoming County, Pennsylvania
- Mill Creek Township, Mercer County, Pennsylvania

== See also ==
- Millcreek Township, Pennsylvania (disambiguation)
