= Jackson Center =

Jackson Center may refer to:

- Jackson Center, Ohio
- Jackson Center, Pennsylvania
