= Reynolds Heights, Pennsylvania =

Unincorporated community in Pennsylvania, US

Coordinates: 41°20′46″N 80°24′13″W

- Census-designated place
- Interactive map of Reynolds Heights, Pennsylvania
- Country: United States
- State: Pennsylvania
- County: Mercer

Area
  - Total: 2.91 sq mi (7.53 km^{2})
  - Land: 2.90 sq mi (7.52 km^{2})
  - Water: 0.0039 sq mi (0.01 km^{2})

Population (2020)
  - Total: 1,974
  - Density: 679.8/sq mi (262.49/km^{2})
- Time zone: UTC-5 (Eastern (EST))
  - Summer (DST): UTC-4 (EDT)
- FIPS code: 42-64368

Reynolds Heights is a census-designated place located in Pymatuning Township and in Mercer County in the state of Pennsylvania. The community is located off Pennsylvania Route 18. As of the 2010 census the population was 2,061 residents, which fell to 1,974 inhabitants at the 2020 Census. It is part of the Hermitage micropolitan area.

== Demographics ==
Historical population
Census	Pop.	Note	%±
2010	2,061		—
2020	1,974		−4.2%
U.S. Decennial Census
