= Lake Latonka, Pennsylvania =

Unincorporated community in Pennsylvania, US

Coordinates: 41°17′00″N 80°11′06″W

- Census-designated place
- Interactive map of Lake Latonka, Pennsylvania
- Country: United States
- State: Pennsylvania
- County: Mercer

Area
  - Total: 2.76 sq mi (7.15 km^{2})
  - Land: 2.36 sq mi (6.10 km^{2})
  - Water: 0.41 sq mi (1.05 km^{2})

Population (2020)
  - Total: 951
  - Density: 403.8/sq mi (155.89/km^{2})
- Time zone: UTC-5 (Eastern (EST))
  - Summer (DST): UTC-4 (EDT)
- ZIP code: 16137
- Area code: 724
- FIPS code: 42-40982

Lake Latonka is a census-designated place in Coolspring and Jackson Townships in Mercer County, Pennsylvania, United States. It surrounds the Lake Latonka reservoir. The population was 951 at the 2020 census. It is part of the Hermitage micropolitan area.

== Demographics ==
As of the 2020 census, there were 951 people, 346 families, and 610 housing units in Lake Latonka. The median age in the CDP was 55.5 years old. 28.9% of the population was 65 years old or older, with 19.1% being between the ages of 65 and 74, 9.1% between the ages of 75 and 84, and 0.7% were 85 or older. The racial demographics of the CDP were 96.5% White, 0.1% African American, 0.5% Asian, 0.1% from some other race, and 2.7% from two or more races. Hispanic and Latino people made up 1% of the population.

The ancestry of the CDP was 19.6% German, 17.4% English, 14.4% Italian, 13.3% Irish, 8.0% Scotch-Irish, 5.7% French, 5.1% Polish, and 3.2% Hungarian. 2.1% of the population spoke languages other than English at home, which are Asian and Pacific Islander languages. 1.1% of the population were foreign born.

Historical population
Census	Pop.	Note	%±
2010	1,012		—
2020	951		−6.0%
U.S. Decennial Census
