= Millcreek Township, Pennsylvania =

Millcreek Township is the name of some places in the U.S. state of Pennsylvania:

- Millcreek Township, Clarion County, Pennsylvania
- Millcreek Township, Erie County, Pennsylvania
- Millcreek Township, Lebanon County, Pennsylvania

== See also ==
- Mill Creek Township, Pennsylvania (disambiguation)
