= Mercer County, Pennsylvania =

County in Pennsylvania, United States

- County
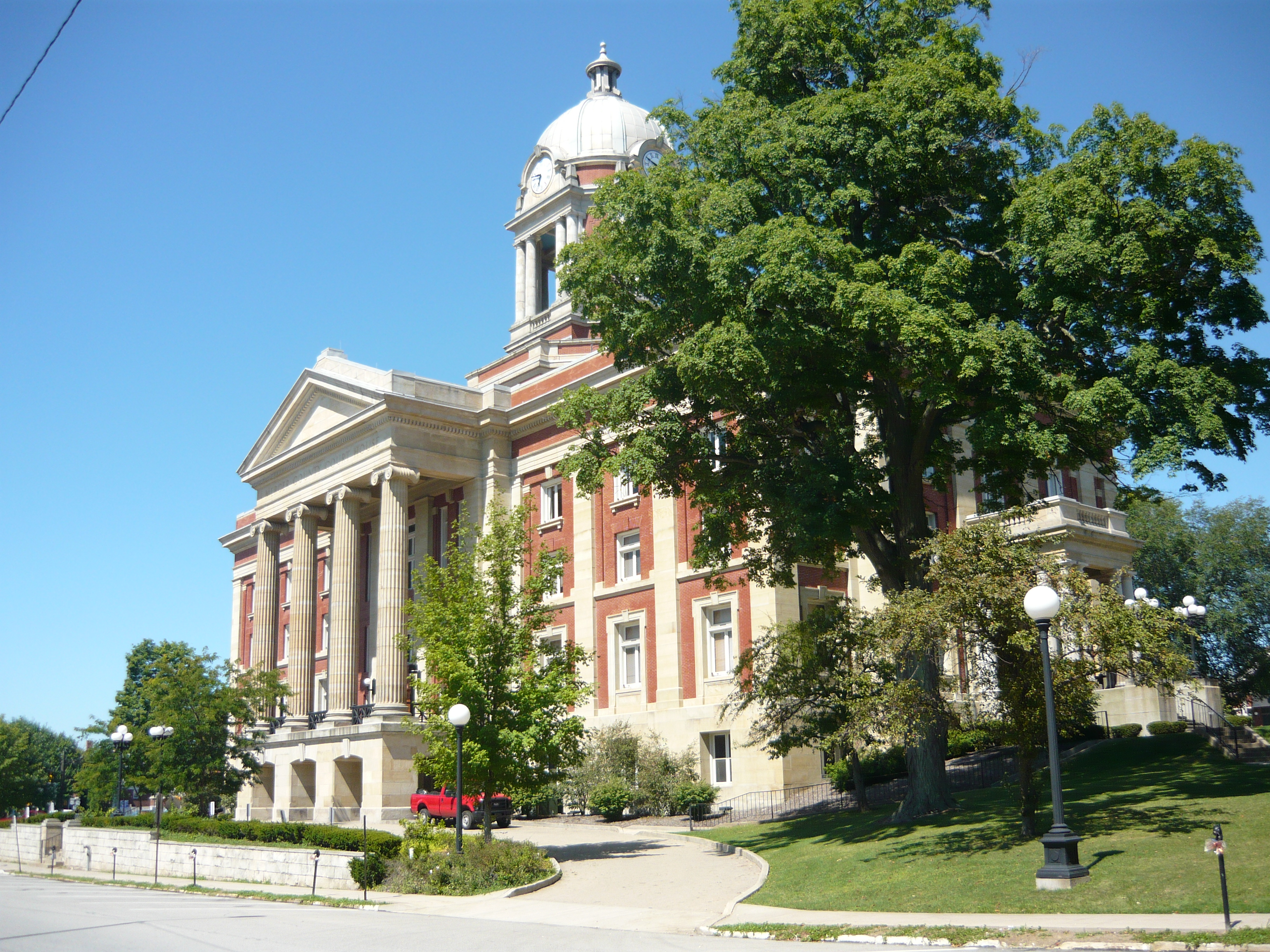
- Mercer County Courthouse (1909)

- Seal

- Location within the U.S. state of Pennsylvania
- Coordinates: 41°19′N 80°15′W
- Country: United States
- State: Pennsylvania
- Founded: November 7, 1803
- Named for: Hugh Mercer
- Seat: Mercer
- Largest city: Hermitage

Area
  - Total: 683 sq mi (1,770 km^{2})
  - Land: 673 sq mi (1,740 km^{2})
  - Water: 10 sq mi (26 km^{2}) 1.5%

Population (2020)
  - Total: 110,652
  - Estimate (2025): 107,860 ▼
  - Density: 160.7/sq mi (62.0/km^{2})
- Time zone: UTC−5 (Eastern)
  - Summer (DST): UTC−4 (EDT)
- Congressional district: 16th
- Website: www.mercercountypa.gov

Mercer County is a county in the Commonwealth of Pennsylvania. As of the 2020 census, the population was 110,652. Its county seat is Mercer, and its largest city is Hermitage. The county is part of the Northwest Pennsylvania region of the state. (Note: Includes Erie, Mercer, Crawford and Venango Counties)

Mercer County compromises the Hermitage, PA Micropolitan Statistical Area, which is included in the Greater Pittsburgh area.

== History ==
Mercer County was created in 1800 and later organized in 1803.

== Geography ==
According to the U.S. Census Bureau, the county has a total area of 683 square miles (1,770 km^{2}), of which 673 square miles (1,740 km^{2}) is land and 10 square miles (26 km^{2}) (1.5%) is water. It has a humid continental climate (Dfa/Dfb) and average monthly temperatures in Sharon range from 27.1 °F in January to 72.2 °F in July, while in Mercer borough they range from 25.4 °F in January to 70.1 °F in July. Mercer County is one of the 423 counties served by the Appalachian Regional Commission, and it is identified as part of the "Midlands" by Colin Woodard in his book American Nations: A History of the Eleven Rival Regional Cultures of North America.

=== Adjacent counties ===
- Crawford County (north)
- Venango County (east)
- Butler County (southeast)
- Lawrence County (south)
- Mahoning County, Ohio (southwest)
- Trumbull County, Ohio (west)

=== Major highways ===
- I-79
- I-80
- I-376
- US 19
- US 62
- US 322
- PA 18
- PA 58
- PA 158
- PA 173
- PA 208
- PA 258
- PA 318
- PA 358
- PA 418
- PA 518
- PA 718
- PA 760
- PA 846
- PA 965

== Demographics ==
Historical population
Census	Pop.	Note	%±
1800	3,228		—
1810	8,277		156.4%
1820	11,681		41.1%
1830	19,729		68.9%
1840	32,873		66.6%
1850	33,172		0.9%
1860	36,856		11.1%
1870	49,977		35.6%
1880	56,161		12.4%
1890	55,744		−0.7%
1900	57,387		2.9%
1910	77,699		35.4%
1920	93,788		20.7%
1930	99,246		5.8%
1940	101,039		1.8%
1950	111,954		10.8%
1960	127,519		13.9%
1970	127,175		−0.3%
1980	128,299		0.9%
1990	121,003		−5.7%
2000	120,293		−0.6%
2010	116,638		−3.0%
2020	110,652		−5.1%
2025 (est.)	107,860	▼	−2.5%
U.S. Decennial Census; 1790–1960 1900–1990; 1990–2000 2010–2019 2020 2024

=== Racial and ethnic composition ===
Mercer County, Pennsylvania – Racial and ethnic composition Note: the US Census treats Hispanic/Latino as an ethnic category. This table excludes Latinos from the racial categories and assigns them to a separate category. Hispanics/Latinos may be of any race.
Race / Ethnicity (NH = Non-Hispanic)	Pop 1980	Pop 1990	Pop 2000	Pop 2010	Pop 2020	% 1980	% 1990	% 2000	% 2010	% 2020
White alone (NH)	122,074	114,086	111,507	106,176	96,998	95.15%	94.28%	92.70%	91.03%	87.66%
Black or African American alone (NH)	5,392	5,858	6,279	6,620	6,289	4.20%	4.84%	5.22%	5.68%	5.68%
Native American or Alaska Native alone (NH)	94	108	113	132	116	0.07%	0.09%	0.09%	0.11%	0.10%
Asian alone (NH)	242	381	477	726	683	0.19%	0.31%	0.40%	0.62%	0.62%
Native Hawaiian or Pacific Islander alone (NH)	x	x	21	15	14	x	x	0.02%	0.01%	0.01%
Other race alone (NH)	106	64	85	103	342	0.08%	0.05%	0.07%	0.09%	0.31%
Mixed race or Multiracial (NH)	x	x	1,008	1,618	4,601	x	x	0.84%	1.39%	4.16%
Hispanic or Latino (any race)	391	506	803	1,248	1,609	0.30%	0.42%	0.67%	1.07%	1.45%
Total	128,299	121,003	120,293	116,638	110,652	100.00%	100.00%	100.00%	100.00%	100.00%

=== 2020 census ===
As of the 2020 census, the county had a population of 110,652 and a median age of 45.1 years. 19.5% of residents were under the age of 18 and 22.8% of residents were 65 years of age or older. For every 100 females there were 98.1 males, and for every 100 females age 18 and over there were 96.2 males age 18 and over.

The racial makeup of the county was 88.1% White, 5.8% Black or African American, 0.1% American Indian and Alaska Native, 0.6% Asian, <0.1% Native Hawaiian and Pacific Islander, 0.6% from some other race, and 4.7% from two or more races. Hispanic or Latino residents of any race comprised 1.5% of the population.

52.1% of residents lived in urban areas, while 47.9% lived in rural areas.

There were 45,478 households in the county, of which 24.6% had children under the age of 18 living in them. Of all households, 46.2% were married-couple households, 18.9% were households with a male householder and no spouse or partner present, and 28.3% were households with a female householder and no spouse or partner present. About 31.7% of all households were made up of individuals and 15.9% had someone living alone who was 65 years of age or older.

There were 50,828 housing units, of which 10.5% were vacant. Among occupied housing units, 72.1% were owner-occupied and 27.9% were renter-occupied. The homeowner vacancy rate was 1.9% and the rental vacancy rate was 10.5%.

=== 2000 census ===
As of the census of 2000, there were 120,293 people, 46,712 households, and 32,371 families residing in the county. The population density was 179 inhabitants per square mile (69 inhabitants/km^{2}). There were 49,859 housing units at an average density of 74 units per square mile (29/km^{2}). The racial makeup of the county was 93.13% White, 5.25% Black or African American, 0.11% Native American, 0.40% Asian, 0.02% Pacific Islander, 0.17% from other races, and 0.91% from two or more races. 0.67% of the population were Hispanic or Latino of any race. 37.7% were of German, 20.0% Irish, 14.9% Italian, 12.0% English, 6.4% American, 6.2% Polish, 3.7% Scotch-Irish, 3.3% Dutch ancestry.

There were 46,712 households, out of which 29.30% had children under the age of 18 living with them, 54.80% were married couples living together, 10.90% had a female householder with no husband present, and 30.70% were non-families. 27.00% of all households were made up of individuals, and 13.20% had someone living alone who was 65 years of age or older. The average household size was 2.44 and the average family size was 2.96.

In the county, the population was spread out, with 23.40% under the age of 18, 8.90% from 18 to 24, 26.10% from 25 to 44, 23.50% from 45 to 64, and 18.10% who were 65 years of age or older. The median age was 40 years. For every 100 females there were 94.70 males. For every 100 females age 18 and over, there were 90.80 males.

== Government and politics ==
United States presidential election results for Mercer County, Pennsylvania
Year	Republican		Democratic		Third party(ies)	
Year	No.	%	No.	%	No.	%
1880	6,079	51.33%	5,029	42.46%	735	6.21%
1884	6,357	51.81%	4,861	39.62%	1,052	8.57%
1888	6,428	53.91%	4,806	40.31%	689	5.78%
1892	5,874	50.80%	4,931	42.65%	757	6.55%
1896	7,262	55.53%	5,500	42.06%	315	2.41%
1900	6,950	55.94%	4,916	39.57%	559	4.50%
1904	8,574	60.67%	3,845	27.21%	1,714	12.13%
1908	6,497	47.27%	5,473	39.82%	1,774	12.91%
1912	1,873	14.73%	4,039	31.76%	6,806	53.51%
1916	5,866	42.66%	6,390	46.47%	1,495	10.87%
1920	11,575	60.29%	4,823	25.12%	2,801	14.59%
1924	14,639	65.29%	3,688	16.45%	4,093	18.26%
1928	22,599	72.71%	8,204	26.39%	280	0.90%
1932	14,057	53.53%	10,961	41.74%	1,240	4.72%
1936	18,493	45.88%	20,879	51.79%	939	2.33%
1940	21,058	55.10%	16,968	44.40%	189	0.49%
1944	19,606	53.85%	16,589	45.57%	212	0.58%
1948	18,916	52.71%	16,108	44.89%	862	2.40%
1952	26,424	55.59%	20,770	43.69%	343	0.72%
1956	28,785	59.14%	19,769	40.62%	120	0.25%
1960	29,109	54.43%	24,243	45.33%	128	0.24%
1964	18,153	35.90%	32,199	63.68%	211	0.42%
1968	23,131	47.11%	22,814	46.46%	3,160	6.44%
1972	27,961	59.37%	18,087	38.40%	1,052	2.23%
1976	22,469	46.58%	25,041	51.91%	725	1.50%
1980	22,372	48.54%	19,716	42.78%	4,002	8.68%
1984	24,211	49.11%	24,658	50.01%	434	0.88%
1988	21,301	46.43%	24,278	52.92%	301	0.66%
1992	16,081	32.27%	23,264	46.68%	10,491	21.05%
1996	17,213	37.60%	23,003	50.25%	5,563	12.15%
2000	23,132	47.47%	23,817	48.87%	1,783	3.66%
2004	26,311	51.03%	24,831	48.16%	422	0.82%
2008	26,565	49.04%	26,411	48.76%	1,192	2.20%
2012	25,925	50.79%	24,232	47.48%	882	1.73%
2016	31,544	59.70%	18,733	35.45%	2,562	4.85%
2020	36,143	62.19%	21,067	36.25%	907	1.56%
2024	37,761	64.45%	20,145	34.38%	685	1.17%

United States Senate election results for Mercer County, Pennsylvania1
Year	Republican		Democratic		Third party(ies)	
Year	No.	%	No.	%	No.	%
1994	18,133	51.67%	16,288	46.42%	671	1.91%
2000	23,157	50.23%	22,191	48.13%	755	1.64%
2006	16,274	42.92%	21,640	57.08%	0	0.00%
2012	24,772	49.36%	24,314	48.45%	1,101	2.19%
2018	22,290	54.24%	18,136	44.13%	671	1.63%
2024	36,468	62.78%	20,302	34.95%	1,318	2.27%

United States Senate election results for Mercer County, Pennsylvania3
Year	Republican		Democratic		Third party(ies)	
Year	No.	%	No.	%	No.	%
1992	19,749	43.20%	24,113	52.74%	1,855	4.06%
1998	15,904	54.52%	12,122	41.55%	1,145	3.93%
2004	24,620	51.96%	19,739	41.66%	3,025	6.38%
2010	20,095	55.67%	16,000	44.33%	0	0.00%
2016	30,567	59.00%	19,193	37.05%	2,046	3.95%
2022	27,049	59.64%	17,080	37.66%	1,223	2.70%

Pennsylvania Gubernatorial election results for Mercer County
Year	Republican		Democratic		Third party(ies)	
Year	No.	%	No.	%	No.	%
1970	15,740	40.89%	21,601	56.12%	1,153	3.00%
1974	18,808	50.89%	17,518	47.40%	634	1.72%
1978	17,052	49.30%	17,119	49.49%	420	1.21%
1982	18,217	46.87%	20,043	51.57%	607	1.56%
1986	15,577	44.03%	19,406	54.85%	398	1.12%
1990	10,479	30.32%	24,078	69.67%	1	0.00%
1994	19,617	55.33%	12,294	34.67%	3,546	10.00%
1998	15,958	52.77%	10,349	34.23%	3,931	13.00%
2002	16,429	52.36%	14,161	45.13%	787	2.51%
2006	18,237	47.83%	19,888	52.17%	0	0.00%
2010	21,146	58.43%	15,047	41.57%	0	0.00%
2014	15,397	51.56%	14,466	48.44%	0	0.00%
2018	22,211	54.72%	18,200	44.84%	182	0.45%
2022	26,273	57.96%	18,282	40.33%	776	1.71%

=== Voter registration ===
As of June 12, 2023, there are 70,553 registered voters in the county. Republicans hold a plurality of voters by a margin of 10,354 voters (14.67% of the total registered). There are 35,735 registered Republicans, 25,381 registered Democrats, 7,319 registered non-affiliated voters, and 2,118 voters registered to third parties.

Chart of Voter Registration
1. Republican (50.6%)
2. Democratic (36.0%)
3. Independent (10.4%)
4. Third Party (3.01%)

Voter registration and party enrollment
Party	Number of voters	Percentage
Republican	35,735	50.65
Democratic	25,381	35.97
Independent	7,319	10.37
Third Party	2,118	3.01
Total	70,553	100%

=== Political bellwether ===
Mercer County was previously considered a political bellwether for the state of Pennsylvania since its demographics, urban-rural ratio, and party affiliation once closely mirrored the state as a whole. In 2000, Al Gore carried it against George W. Bush. This trend failed to hold true in 2004 and 2008, in which Mercer County voted more conservatively than the rest of the state. In 2004, Bush won Mercer County with 51% of the vote. That year, John Kerry won the state as a whole with 51% of the popular vote. In 2008, John McCain won Mercer County by fewer than 200 votes, as he and Barack Obama each received roughly 49% of the popular vote. Obama won Pennsylvania as a whole with 55% of the popular vote. Each of the three statewide office winners also carried Mercer in 2008. In 2016, Donald Trump won Mercer County by 12,403 votes, and he also won all of Pennsylvania. Each of the three Republican candidates for statewide office carried Mercer County in 2016. In 2020, Trump again carried the county, despite Pennsylvania narrowly voting for Joe Biden. Trump won 62% of the vote, the largest majority for any major party candidate since 1964, and the largest majority for a Republican since 1928.. In 2024, Trump won the county for a third time, receiving 64.45% of the vote, and breaking the record set in the last election.

=== County officials ===
Commissioner	Party	Title
Ann Coleman	Republican	Chairman
William A Finley, Jr.	Republican	Vice Chairman
Timothy McGonigle	Democrat	Secretary

Office	Official	Party
President Judge of Court of Common Pleas	Daniel P. Wallace	Republican
Judge of Court of Common Pleas	D. Neil McEwen	Republican
Judge of Court of Common Pleas	Tedd C. Nesbit	Republican
Judge of Court of Common Pleas	Ronald D. Amrhein Jr.	Republican
Clerk of Courts/Register of Wills	Mary Jo Basilone DePreta	Republican
District Attorney	Pete Acker	Republican
Coroner	John A. Libonati	Republican
Sheriff	Bruce Rosa	Republican
Treasurer	Amber White	Republican
Prothonotary	Ruth Bice	Republican
Recorder of Deeds	Dee Dee Zickar	Republican
Controller	Steve Sherman	Republican

=== State House of Representatives ===
District	Representative	Party
7	Parke Wentling	Republican
17	Timothy R. Bonner	Republican

=== State Senate ===
District	Senator	Party
50	Michele Brooks	Republican

=== United States House of Representatives ===
District	Representative	Party
16	Mike Kelly	Republican

=== United States Senate ===
Senator	Party
John Fetterman	Democrat
Dave McCormick	Republican

== Education ==
=== Higher education ===
- Grove City College (Grove City)
- Thiel College (Greenville)
- Pennsylvania State University, Shenango Campus (Sharon)
- Butler County Community College, BC3 @ Linden Pointe (Hermitage)

=== Career-based education ===
- Laurel Technical Institute, Sharon
- Mercer County Career and Technical Center, Mercer
- Penn State Cosmetology Academy, Hermitage
- Sharon Regional Health System Schools of Nursing and Radiology, Sharon

=== Public school districts ===
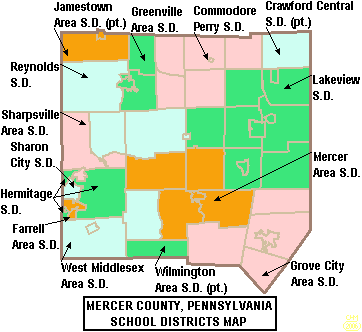
Map of Mercer County, Pennsylvania Public School Districts

- Crawford Central School District
- Commodore Perry School District
- Farrell Area School District
- Greenville Area School District
- Grove City Area School District
- Hermitage School District
- Jamestown Area School District
- Lakeview School District
- Mercer Area School District
- Reynolds School District
- Sharon City School District
- Sharpsville Area School District
- West Middlesex Area School District
- Wilmington Area School District

=== Charter schools ===
- Keystone Education Center Charter School, Greenville, PA. 256 pupils grades 7–12 Report Card 2010.

=== Private schools ===
- Kennedy Catholic High School, Hermitage, PA.
- Hermitage Christian Academy, Hermitage, PA

== Recreation ==
There is one Pennsylvania state park in Mercer County. Maurice K. Goddard State Park, named for Maurice K. Goddard, former Secretary of the Pennsylvania Department of Environmental Resources, is just off exit 130 of Interstate 79 on Pennsylvania Route 358 near Stoneboro.

The Shenango River Lake has camping and boating facilities operated by the Army Corps of Engineers.

The Wendell August Forge, the last remaining working forge in the state, was open to the public for tours, but it burned down on March 6, 2010. It has since reopened in new facilities.

Mercer County Court House built in 1909.

== Communities ==
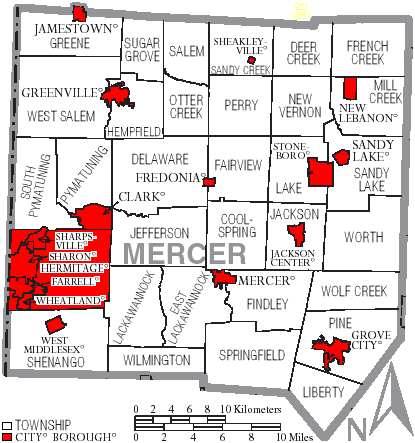
Map of Mercer County, Pennsylvania with Municipal Labels showing Cities and Boroughs (red) and Townships (white)

Under Pennsylvania law, there are four types of incorporated municipalities: cities, boroughs, townships, and, in one case, towns. The following cities, boroughs and townships are located in Mercer County:

=== Cities ===
- Farrell
- Hermitage (largest city in Mercer County)
- Sharon

=== Boroughs ===
- Clark
- Fredonia
- Greenville
- Grove City
- Jackson Center
- Jamestown
- Mercer (county seat)
- New Lebanon
- Sandy Lake
- Sharpsville
- Sheakleyville
- Stoneboro
- West Middlesex

=== Townships ===
- Coolspring
- Deer Creek
- Delaware
- East Lackawannock
- Fairview
- Findley
- French Creek
- Greene
- Hempfield
- Jackson
- Jefferson
- Lackawannock
- Lake
- Liberty
- Mill Creek
- New Vernon
- Otter Creek
- Perry
- Pine
- Pymatuning
- Salem
- Sandy Creek
- Sandy Lake
- Shenango
- South Pymatuning
- Springfield
- Sugar Grove
- West Salem
- Wilmington
- Wolf Creek
- Worth

=== Census-designated places ===
- Lake Latonka
- Reynolds Heights

=== Unincorporated communities ===
- Blacktown
- Briscoe Springs
- Carlton
- Charleston
- Clarks Mills
- Delaware Grove
- Fairview (village)
- Hadley
- Kennard
- Kremis
- London
- Maysville
- Milledgeville
- New Vernon
- North Liberty
- Oniontown
- Osgood
- Perrine Corners
- Petersburg
- Salem
- Shenango (village)
- Transfer
- Williams Corners

=== Former communities ===
- Hickory Township, which became the Municipality of Hermitage in 1976, and then the City of Hermitage in 1984.
- Mahoning Township, was part of Mercer County from 1806 until 1849, when Lawrence County was created.
- Neshannock Township, was part of Mercer County from the county's creation in 1803 until 1849, when Lawrence County was created.
- New Castle Borough, which was part of Mercer County from 1825 until 1849, when it joined Lawrence County and became its county seat.
- Pulaski Township, which was part of Mercer County from 1846 until 1849, when Lawrence County was created.
- Wheatland, which was annexed by the City of Hermitage in 2024.

=== Mixed Nomenclature ===
- Borough of Greenville, is interchangeably designated as Town of Greenville with exact municipal designation currently unclear.

=== Population ranking ===
The population ranking of the following table is based on the 2010 census and 2020 census of Mercer County.

† county seat

Rank	City/Town/etc.	Municipal type	Population (2010 Census)	Population (2020 Census)
1	Hermitage	City	16,413	16,231
2	Sharon	City	14,021	13,150
3	Grove City	Borough	8,334	7,884
4	Greenville	Borough	5,953	5,540
5	Farrell	City	4,953	4,259
6	Sharpsville	Borough	4,417	4,252
7	† Mercer	Borough	2,042	1,985
8	Reynolds Heights	CDP	2,061	1,974
9	Lake Latonka	CDP	1,012	951
10	Stoneboro	Borough	1,051	947
11	West Middlesex	Borough	863	816
12	Sandy Lake	Borough	657	650
13	Wheatland	Borough	632	583
14	Jamestown	Borough	617	582
15	Clark	Borough	640	575
16	Fredonia	Borough	494	435
17	Jackson Center	Borough	224	191
18	New Lebanon	Borough	189	185
19	Sheakleyville	Borough	142	150

== See also ==
- National Register of Historic Places listings in Mercer County, Pennsylvania
