= Wolf Creek Township, Pennsylvania =

Township in Pennsylvania, US

Coordinates: 41°13′24″N 80°02′28″W

Wolf Creek Township, Mercer County, Pennsylvania
- Township
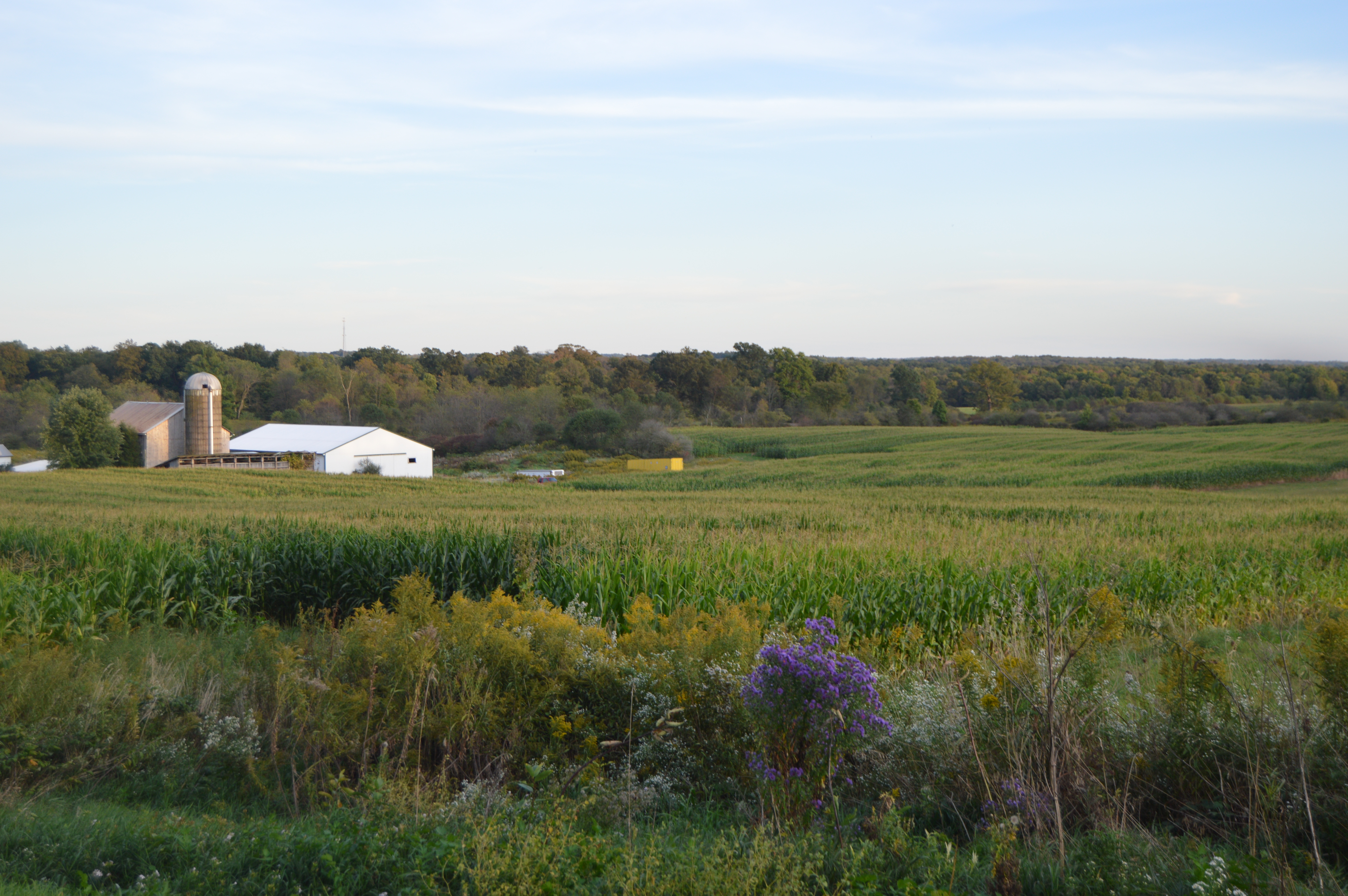
- Farm on Gilmore Road

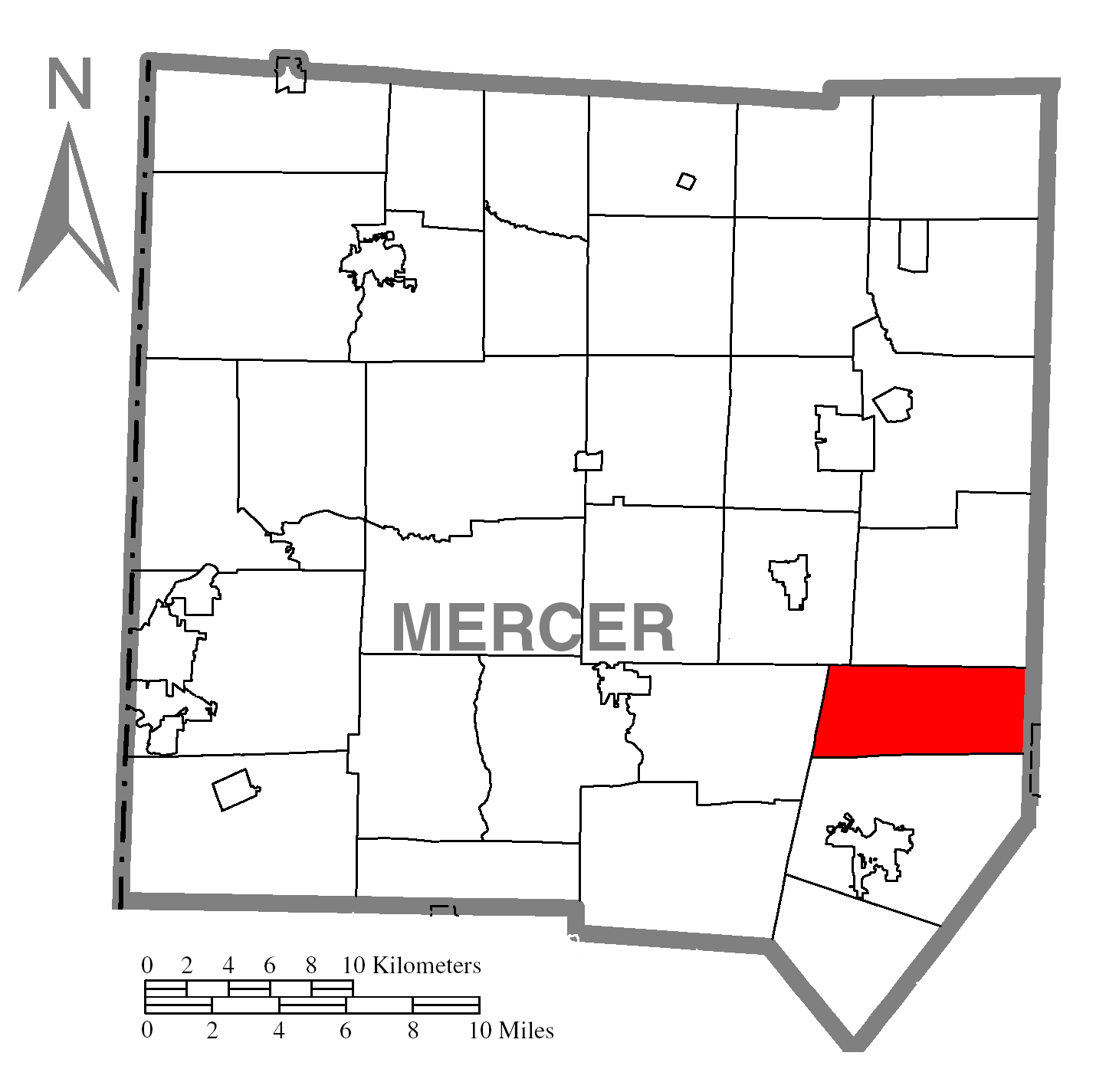
- Location of Wolf Creek Township in Mercer County

- Location of Mercer County in Pennsylvania
- Country: United States
- State: Pennsylvania
- County: Mercer County

Area
  - Total: 17.08 sq mi (44.23 km^{2})
  - Land: 16.93 sq mi (43.85 km^{2})
  - Water: 0.15 sq mi (0.38 km^{2})

Population (2020)
  - Total: 716
  - Estimate (2022): 708
  - Density: 49/sq mi (19/km^{2})
- Time zone: UTC-4 (EST)
  - Summer (DST): UTC-5 (EDT)
- Area codes: 724, 814
- FIPS code: 42-085-85992
- Website: http://www.wolfcreektownship.com/

Historical population
Census	Pop.	Note	%±
2000	729		—
2010	832		14.1%
2020	716		−13.9%
2022 (est.)	708		−1.1%
U.S. Decennial Census

Wolf Creek Township is a township in Mercer County, Pennsylvania, United States. The population was 716 at the 2020 census, a decrease from 832 in 2010.

== Geography ==
According to the United States Census Bureau, the township has a total area of 16.8 square miles (43.6 km^{2}), of which 16.6 square miles (43.0 km^{2}) is land and 0.2 square mile (0.6 km^{2}) (1.31%) is water.

== Demographics ==
As of the census of 2000, there were 729 people, 277 households, and 219 families residing in the township. The population density was 43.9 inhabitants per square mile (16.9/km^{2}). There were 292 housing units at an average density of 17.6/sq mi (6.8/km^{2}). The racial makeup of the township was 96.84% White, 0.27% Native American, 1.37% Asian, 0.14% from other races, and 1.37% from two or more races.

There were 277 households, out of which 33.2% had children under the age of 18 living with them, 70.0% were married couples living together, 6.5% had a female householder with no husband present, and 20.9% were non-families. 17.7% of all households were made up of individuals, and 7.9% had someone living alone who was 65 years of age or older. The average household size was 2.63 and the average family size was 2.95.

In the township the population was spread out, with 24.4% under the age of 18, 6.9% from 18 to 24, 28.4% from 25 to 44, 29.4% from 45 to 64, and 11.0% who were 65 years of age or older. The median age was 40 years. For every 100 females there were 101.4 males. For every 100 females age 18 and over, there were 98.9 males.

The median income for a household in the township was $37,500, and the median income for a family was $44,219. Males had a median income of $29,500 versus $21,058 for females. The per capita income for the township was $16,538. About 5.8% of families and 7.0% of the population were below the poverty line, including 8.0% of those under age 18 and 3.9% of those age 65 or over.
