= New Lebanon, Pennsylvania =

Borough in Pennsylvania, US

- Borough
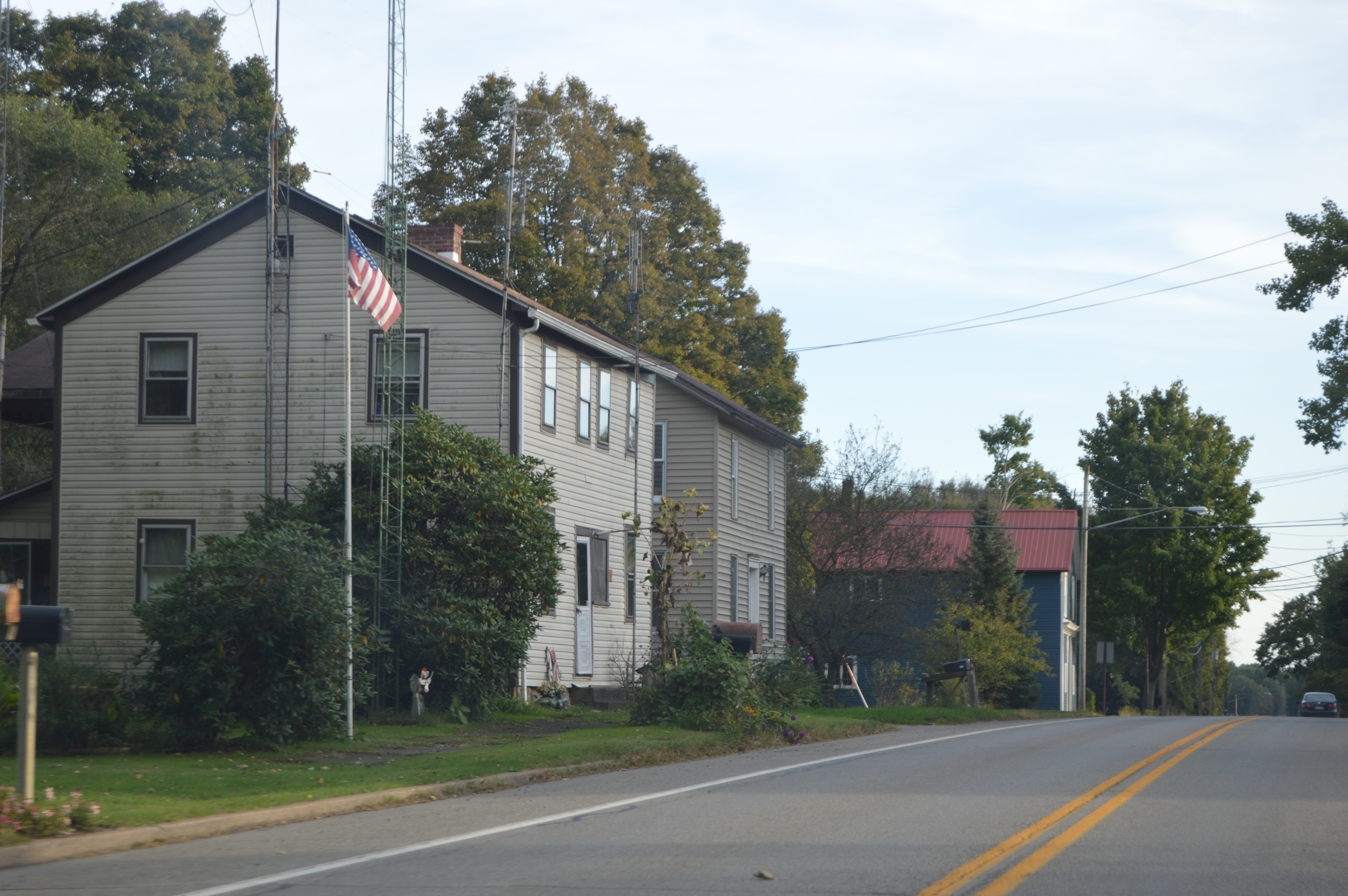
- Houses on Mercer Street

- Location of New Lebanon in Mercer County, Pennsylvania.
- Coordinates: 41°24′53″N 80°4′29″W
- Country: United States
- State: Pennsylvania
- County: Mercer
- Established: 1866

Area
  - Total: 1.28 sq mi (3.31 km^{2})
  - Land: 1.27 sq mi (3.30 km^{2})
  - Water: 0.0039 sq mi (0.01 km^{2})
- Highest elevation (center of borough): 1,400 ft (430 m)
- Lowest elevation (Mill Creek): 1,280 ft (390 m)

Population (2020)
  - Total: 183
  - Density: 143.8/sq mi (55.51/km^{2})
- Time zone: UTC-4 (EST)
  - Summer (DST): UTC-5 (EDT)
- Area code: 724
- FIPS code: 42-53768

New Lebanon is a borough in northeastern Mercer County, Pennsylvania, United States. The population was 186 at the 2020 census. It is part of the Hermitage micropolitan area.

== Geography ==
New Lebanon is located at 41°24′53″N 80°4′29″W (41.414819, -80.074612).

According to the United States Census Bureau, the borough has a total area of 1.3 square miles (3.4 km^{2}), of which 1.3 square miles (3.4 km^{2}) is land and 0.78% is water.

== Demographics ==
Historical population
Census	Pop.	Note	%±
1870	273		—
1880	279		2.2%
1890	263		−5.7%
1900	185		−29.7%
1910	164		−11.4%
1920	118		−28.0%
1930	140		18.6%
1940	154		10.0%
1950	179		16.2%
1960	166		−7.3%
1970	211		27.1%
1980	197		−6.6%
1990	209		6.1%
2000	205		−1.9%
2010	188		−8.3%
2020	183		−2.7%
2021 (est.)	184	▲	0.5%

As of the census of 2000, there were 205 people, 78 households, and 58 families residing in the borough. The population density was 160.0 inhabitants per square mile (61.8/km^{2}). There were 94 housing units at an average density of 73.4 per square mile (28.3/km^{2}). The racial makeup of the borough was 99.51% White, and 0.49% from two or more races.

There were 78 households, out of which 34.6% had children under the age of 18 living with them, 61.5% were married couples living together, 10.3% had a female householder with no husband present, and 25.6% were non-families. 17.9% of all households were made up of individuals, and 9.0% had someone living alone who was 65 years of age or older. The average household size was 2.63 and the average family size was 3.00.

In the borough the population was spread out, with 25.9% under the age of 18, 9.8% from 18 to 24, 26.8% from 25 to 44, 24.9% from 45 to 64, and 12.7% who were 65 years of age or older. The median age was 36 years. For every 100 females there were 88.1 males. For every 100 females age 18 and over, there were 92.4 males.

The median income for a household in the borough was $38,472, and the median income for a family was $38,750. Males had a median income of $34,167 versus $17,750 for females. The per capita income for the borough was $16,735. About 10.0% of families and 12.6% of the population were below the poverty line, including 16.7% of those under the age of eighteen and 21.7% of those sixty five or over.
