= Coolspring Township, Mercer County, Pennsylvania =

Township in Pennsylvania, US

Coordinates: 41°14′30″N 80°15′29″W

- Township
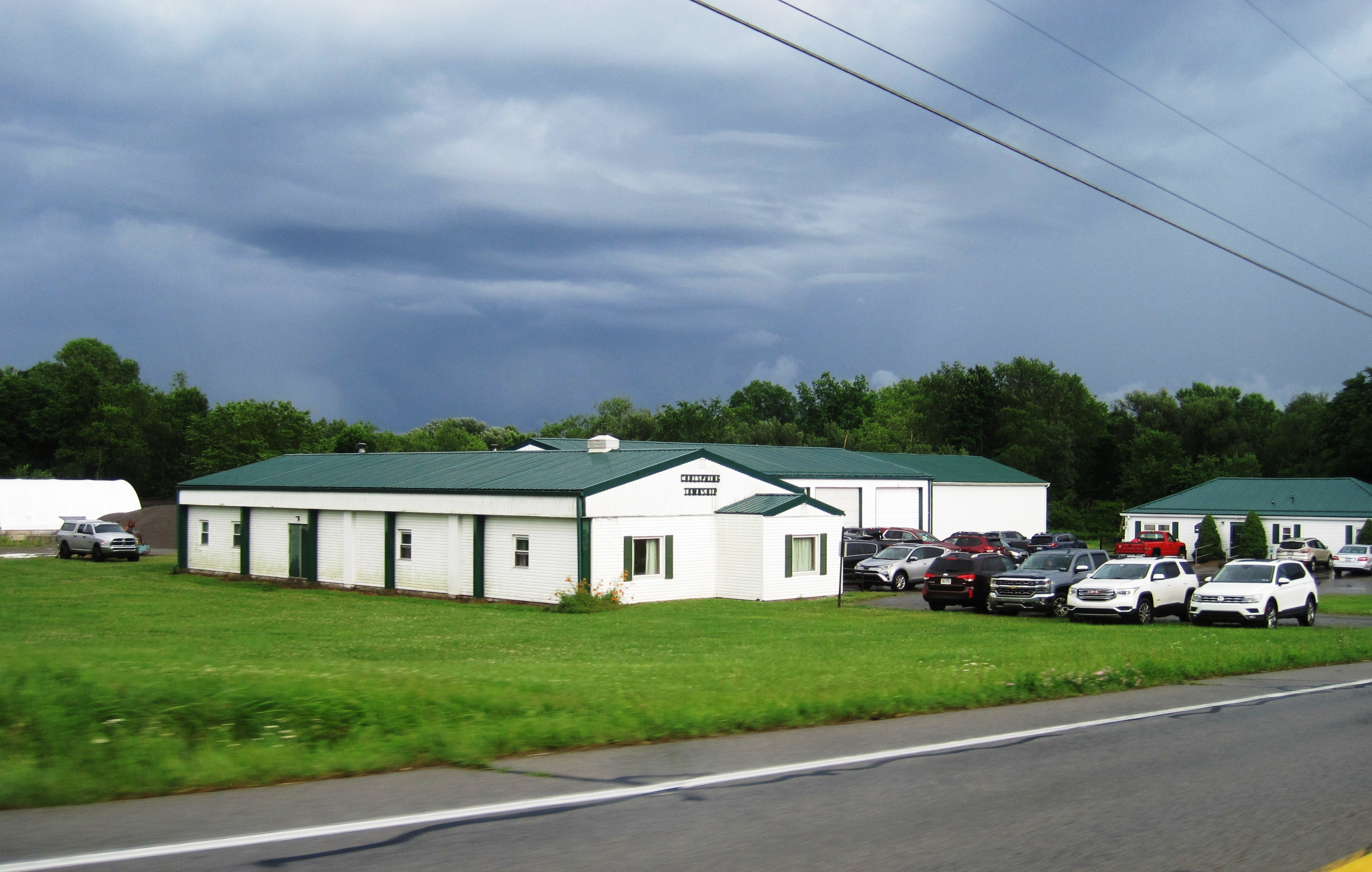
- Township building

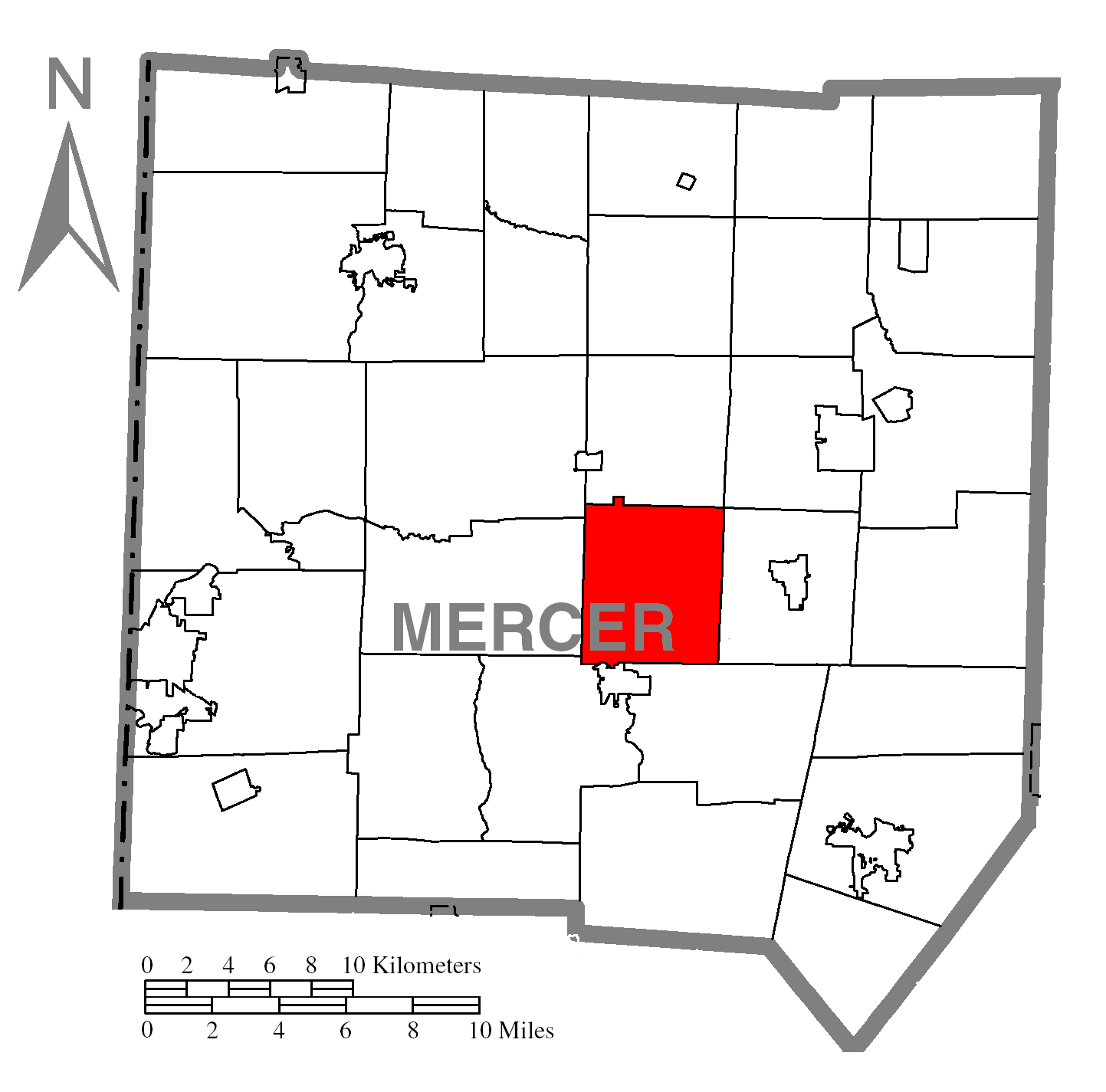
- Location of Coolspring Township in Mercer County

- Location of Mercer County in Pennsylvania
- Country: United States
- State: Pennsylvania
- County: Mercer

Area
  - Total: 19.09 sq mi (49.45 km^{2})
  - Land: 18.77 sq mi (48.62 km^{2})
  - Water: 0.32 sq mi (0.83 km^{2})
- Highest elevation (Rodgers Point at northwestern end of township): 1,360 ft (410 m)
- Lowest elevation (Otter Creek): 1,095 ft (334 m)

Population (2020)
  - Total: 2,113
  - Estimate (2023): 2,081
  - Density: 118.4/sq mi (45.72/km^{2})
- Time zone: UTC-4 (EST)
  - Summer (DST): UTC-5 (EDT)
- Area code: 724
- FIPS code: 42-085-15992
- Website: coolspringtownship.com

Coolspring Township is a township in Mercer County, Pennsylvania, United States. The population was 2,112 at the 2020 census, a decline from the figure of 2,278 in 2010.

== Geography ==
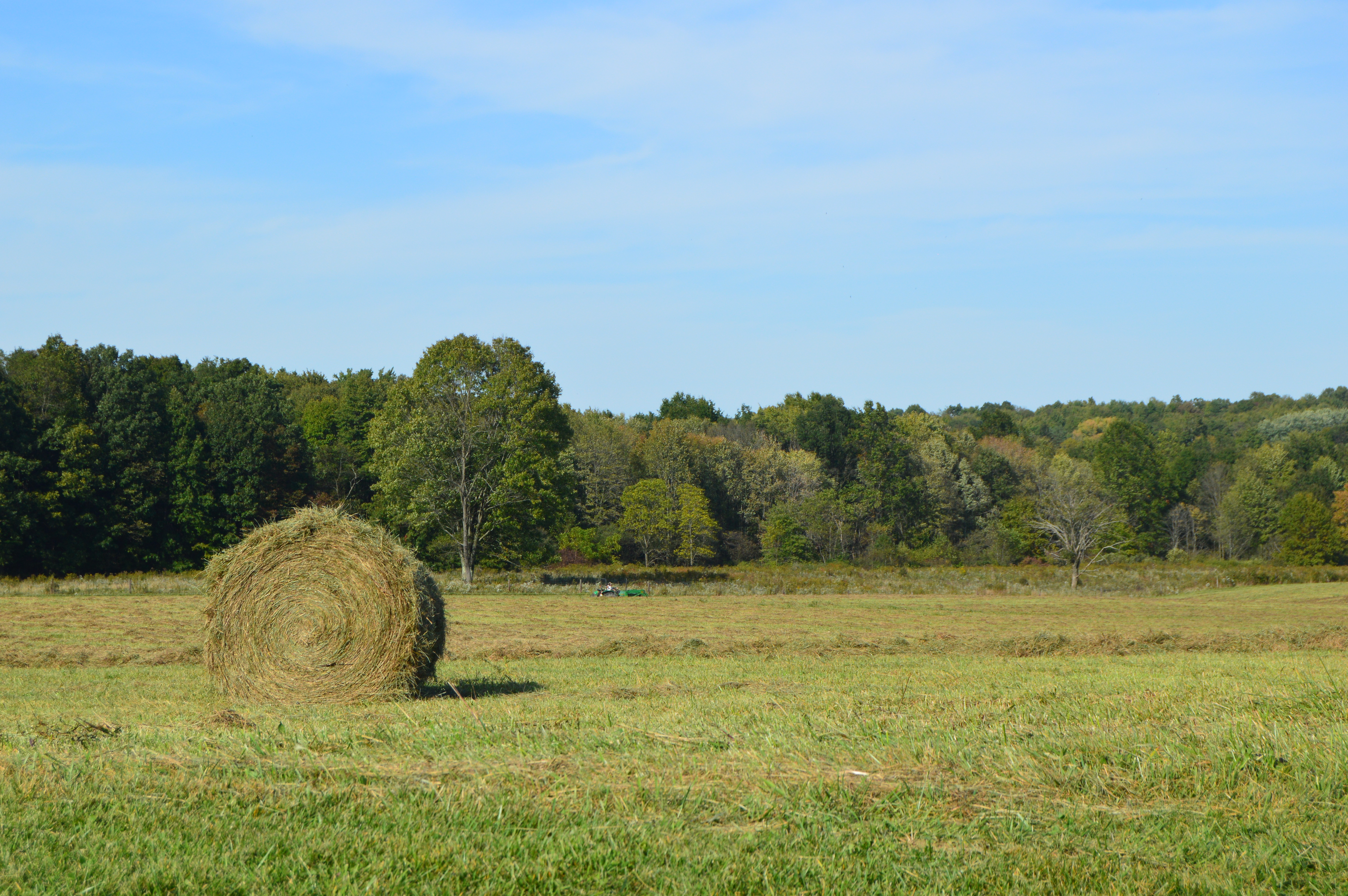
Hay field on PA-258

According to the United States Census Bureau, the township has a total area of 19.6 square miles (51 km^{2}), of which 19.2 square miles (50 km^{2}) is land and 0.4 square miles (1.0 km^{2}) (2.04%) is water. It contains part of the census-designated place of Lake Latonka.

== Demographics ==
Historical population
Census	Pop.	Note	%±
2000	2,287		—
2010	2,278		−0.4%
2020	2,113		−7.2%
2023 (est.)	2,081		−1.5%
U.S. Decennial Census

As of the census of 2000, there were 2,287 people, 818 households, and 627 families residing in the township. The population density was 119.2 inhabitants per square mile (46.0/km^{2}). There were 927 housing units at an average density of 48.3 per square mile (18.6/km^{2}). The racial makeup of the township was 98.73% White, 0.26% African American, 0.31% Native American, 0.31% Asian, 0.09% from other races, and 0.31% from two or more races. Hispanic or Latino of any race were 0.87% of the population.

There were 818 households, out of which 31.3% had children under the age of 18 living with them, 65.5% were married couples living together, 8.1% had a female householder with no husband present, and 23.3% were non-families. 19.3% of all households were made up of individuals, and 6.4% had someone living alone who was 65 years of age or older. The average household size was 2.61 and the average family size was 2.99.

In the township the population was spread out, with 24.6% under the age of 18, 4.8% from 18 to 24, 25.6% from 25 to 44, 26.6% from 45 to 64, and 18.3% who were 65 years of age or older. The median age was 42 years. For every 100 females there were 96.1 males. For every 100 females age 18 and over, there were 91.3 males.

The median income for a household in the township was $37,106, and the median income for a family was $43,654. Males had a median income of $31,422 versus $21,184 for females. The per capita income for the township was $17,724. About 6.3% of families and 10.4% of the population were below the poverty line, including 13.4% of those under age 18 and 16.2% of those age 65 or over.
