= Deer Creek Township, Mercer County, Pennsylvania =

Township in Pennsylvania, US

Coordinates: 41°28′00″N 80°06′59″W

Deer Creek Township
- Township
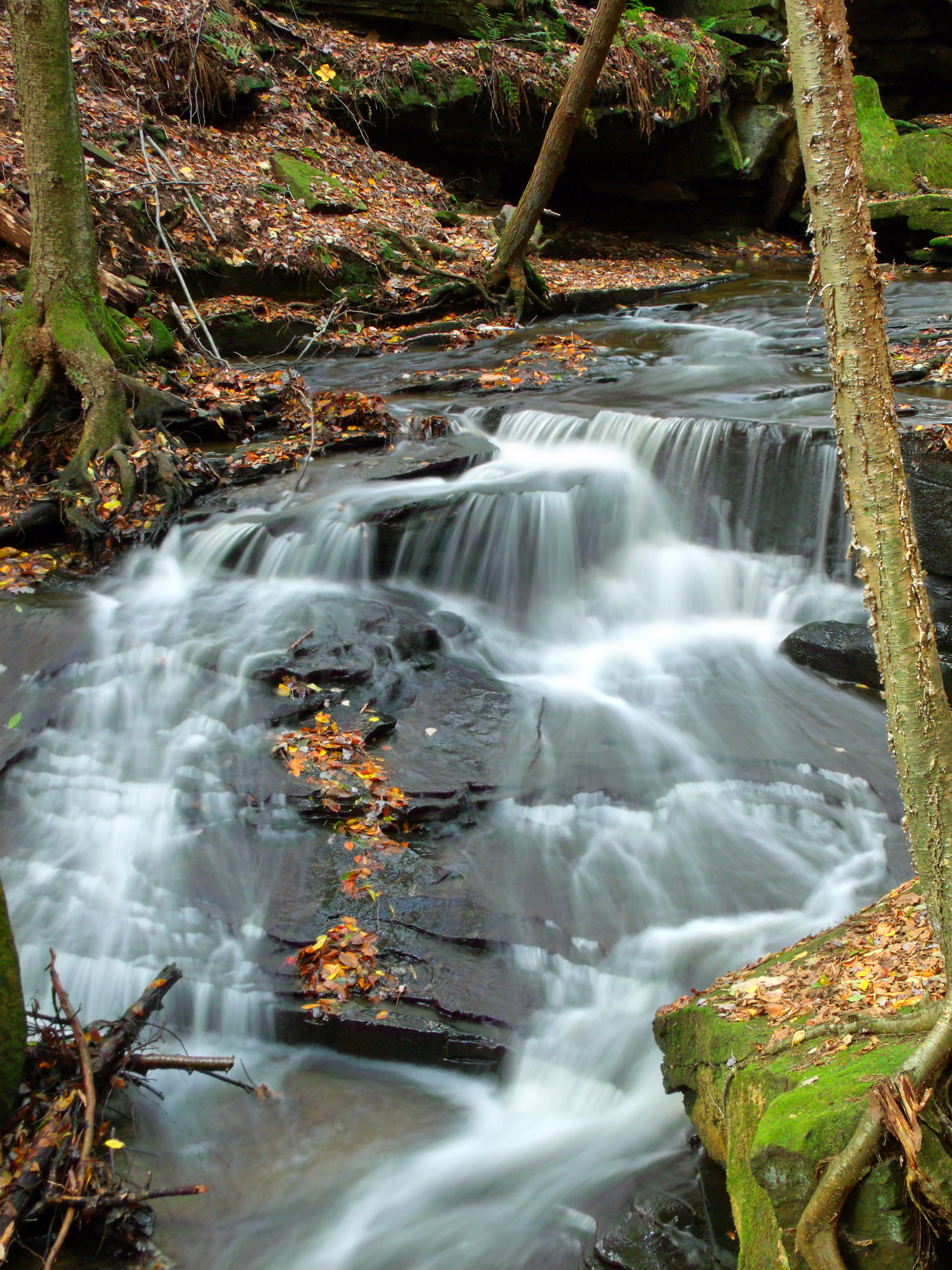
- Waterfall at Maurice K. Goddard State Park

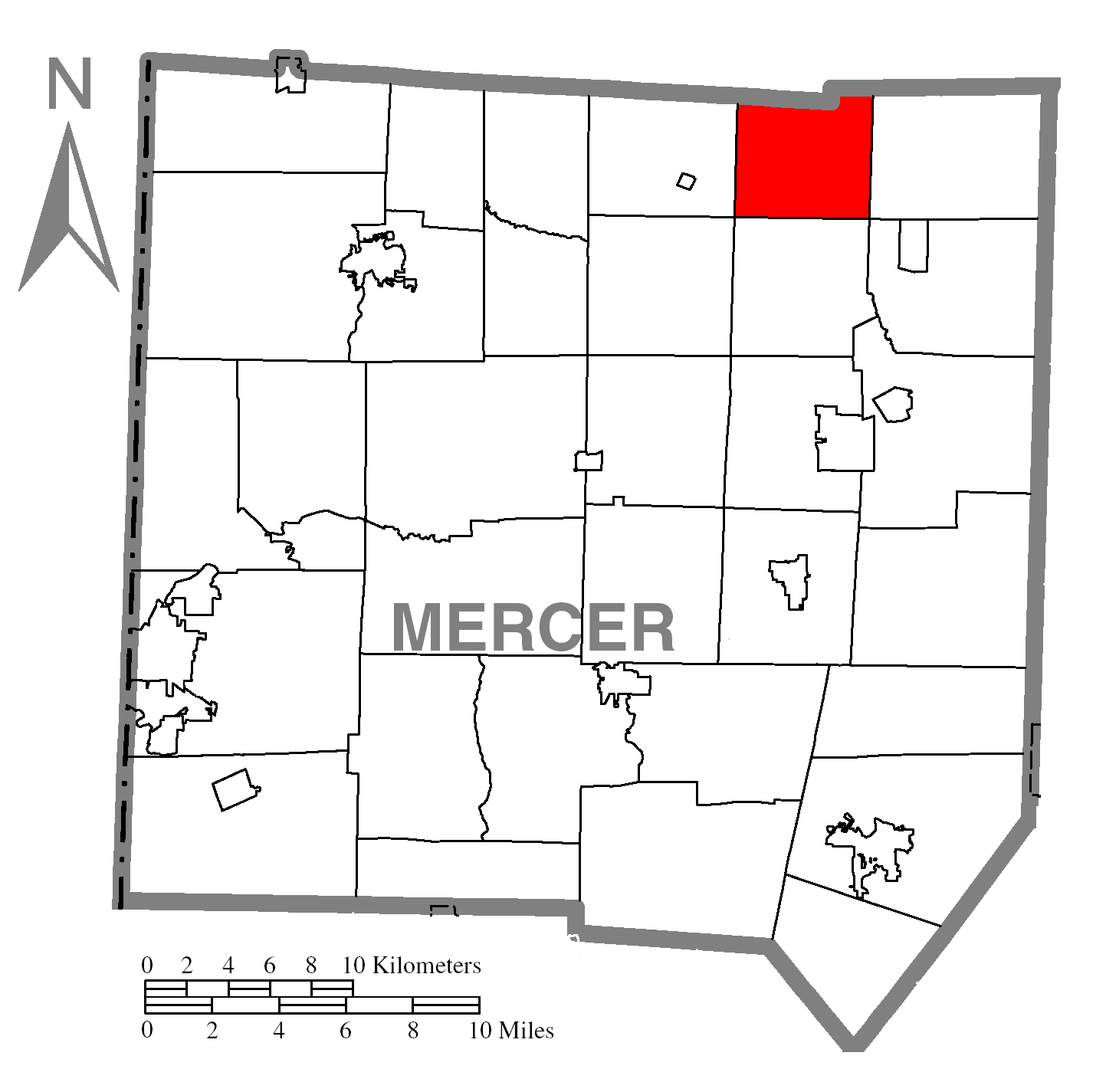
- Location of Deer Creek Township in Mercer County

- Location of Mercer County in Pennsylvania
- Country: United States
- State: Pennsylvania
- County: Mercer

Area
  - Total: 14.85 sq mi (38.46 km^{2})
  - Land: 14.54 sq mi (37.67 km^{2})
  - Water: 0.31 sq mi (0.79 km^{2})

Population (2020)
  - Total: 454
  - Estimate (2023): 443
  - Density: 33.2/sq mi (12.82/km^{2})
- Time zone: UTC-4 (EST)
  - Summer (DST): UTC-5 (EDT)
- Area codes: 724, 814
- FIPS code: 42-085-18536

Historical population
| Census | Pop. | Note | %± |
|---|---|---|---|
| 2000 | 465 | | — |
| 2010 | 502 | | 8.0% |
| 2020 | 456 | | −9.2% |
| 2023 (est.) | 443 | | −2.9% |
U.S. Decennial Census

Deer Creek Township is a township in Mercer County, Pennsylvania, United States. The population was 456 at the 2020 census, a decline from the figure of 502 in 2010.

== Geography ==
According to the United States Census Bureau, the township has a total area of 14.8 square miles (38 km^{2}), of which 14.5 square miles (38 km^{2}) is land and 0.3 square miles (0.78 km^{2}) (1.96%) is water.

== Demographics ==
According to the census of 2000, there were 465 people, 163 households, and 130 families residing in the township. The population density was 32.0 inhabitants per square mile (12.4/km^{2}). There were 177 housing units at an average density of 12.2/sq mi (4.7/km^{2}). The racial makeup of the township was 99.14% White, 0.43% African American, 0.22% Asian, and 0.22% from two or more races. Hispanic or Latino of any race were 0.22% of the population.

There were 163 households, out of which 30.7% had children under the age of 18 living with them, 71.8% were married couples living together, 4.9% had a female householder with no husband present, and 20.2% were non-families. 16.0% of all households were made up of individuals, and 7.4% had someone living alone who was 65 years of age or older. The average household size was 2.80 and the average family size was 3.12.

In the township the population was spread out, with 24.1% under the age of 18, 7.5% from 18 to 24, 28.0% from 25 to 44, 23.9% from 45 to 64, and 16.6% who were 65 years of age or older. The median age was 40 years. For every 100 females there were 97.9 males. For every 100 females age 18 and over, there were 97.2 males.

The median income for a household in the township was $33,542, and the median income for a family was $41,750. Males had a median income of $30,357 versus $20,893 for females. The per capita income for the township was $16,413. About 6.9% of families and 9.0% of the population were below the poverty line, including 9.2% of those under age 18 and none of those age 65 or over.
