= Sandy Creek Township, Pennsylvania =

Township in Pennsylvania, US

Coordinates: 41°27′00″N 80°15′59″W

Sandy Creek Township, Mercer County, Pennsylvania
- Township
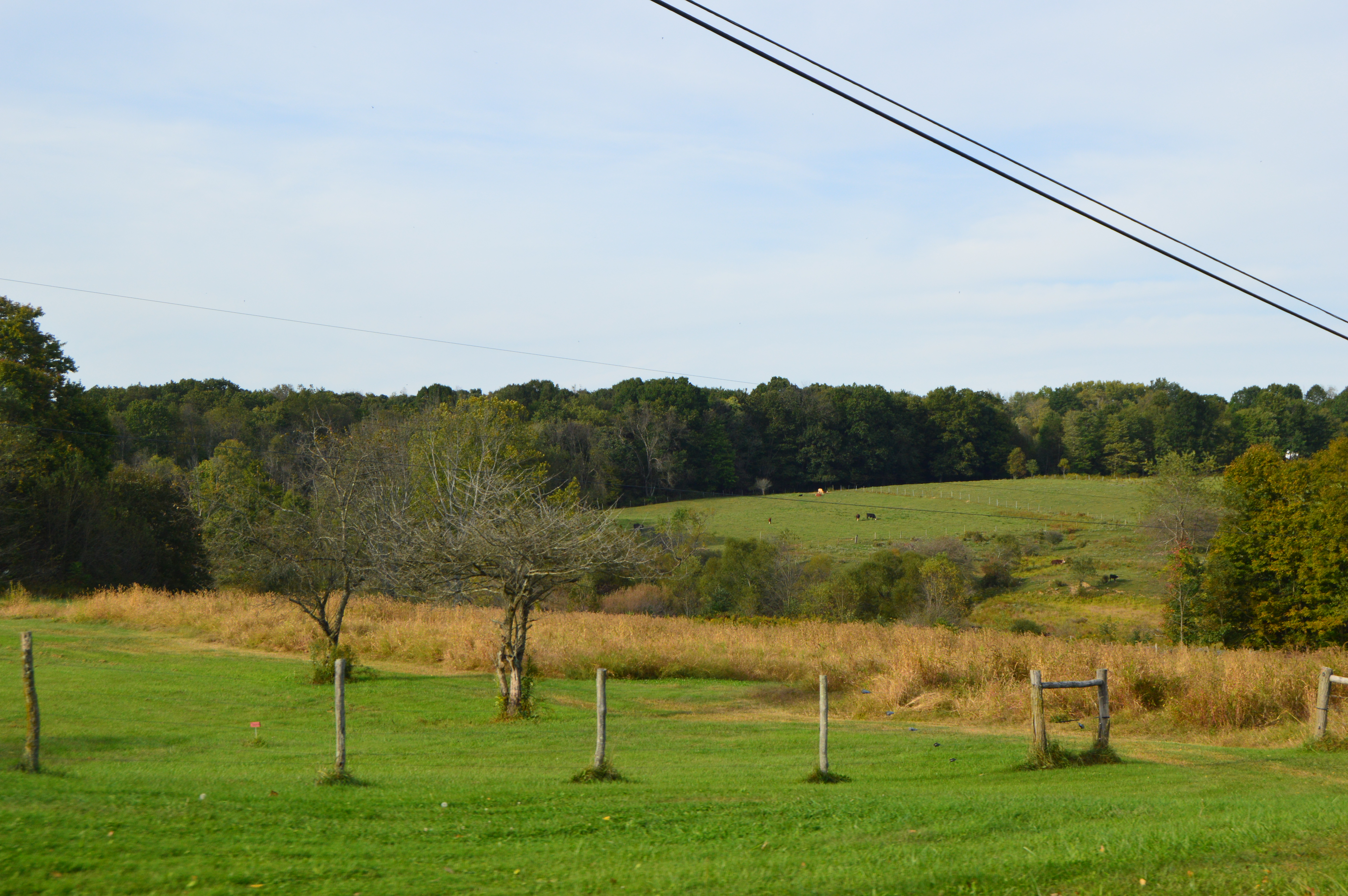
- Countryside at the intersection of Petersburg

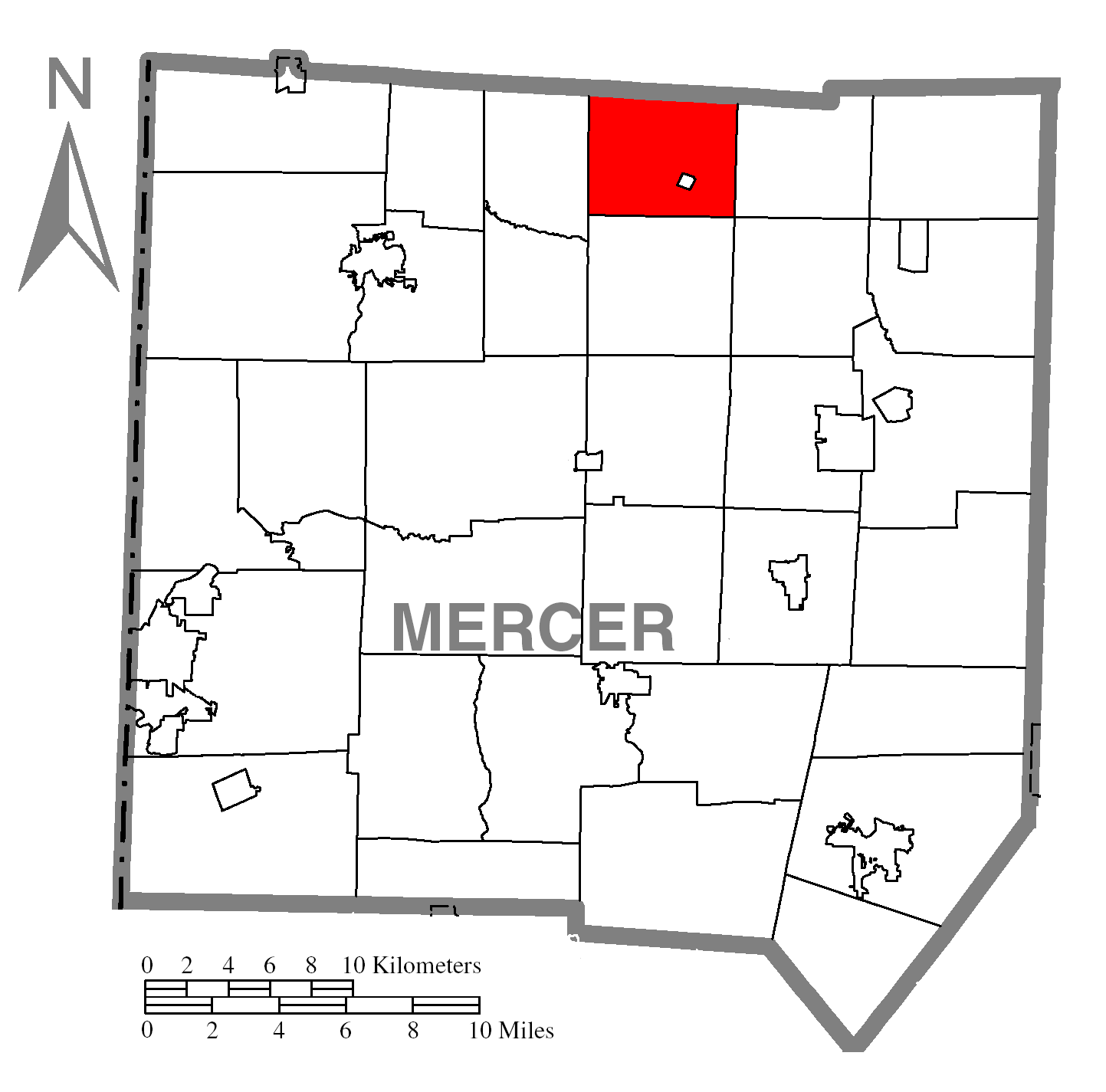
- Location of Sandy Creek Township in Mercer County

- Location of Mercer County in Pennsylvania
- Country: United States
- State: Pennsylvania
- County: Mercer

Area
  - Total: 16.04 sq mi (41.55 km^{2})
  - Land: 15.79 sq mi (40.89 km^{2})
  - Water: 0.25 sq mi (0.66 km^{2})

Population (2020)
  - Total: 802
  - Estimate (2022): 793
  - Density: 48.6/sq mi (18.78/km^{2})
- Time zone: UTC-4 (EST)
  - Summer (DST): UTC-5 (EDT)
- Area code: 724
- FIPS code: 42-085-67816

Historical population
Census	Pop.	Note	%±
2000	848		—
2010	795		−6.2%
2020	800		0.6%
2022 (est.)	793		−0.9%
U.S. Decennial Census

Sandy Creek Township is a township that is located in Mercer County, Pennsylvania, United States. The population was 800 at the time of the 2020 census, an increase from the figure of 795 that was documented in 2010.

== Geography ==
According to the United States Census Bureau, the township has a total area of 16.2 square miles (42.0 km^{2}), of which 15.9 square miles (41.3 km^{2}) is land and 0.3 square mile (0.8 km^{2}) (1.79%) is water.

== Demographics ==
As of the census of 2000, there were 848 people, 324 households, and 246 families residing in the township. The population density was 53.2 inhabitants per square mile (20.5/km^{2}). There were 350 housing units at an average density of 22.0/sq mi (8.5/km^{2}).

The racial makeup of the township was 99.17% White, 0.24% African American, 0.12% Native American, 0.12% Asian, and 0.35% from two or more races.

There were 324 households, out of which 26.9% had children under the age of 18 living with them, 67.6% were married couples living together, 4.6% had a female householder with no husband present, and 23.8% were non-families. 20.1% of all households were made up of individuals, and 8.6% had someone living alone who was 65 years of age or older. The average household size was 2.58 and the average family size was 2.95.

In the township the population was spread out, with 21.9% under the age of 18, 6.7% from 18 to 24, 26.3% from 25 to 44, 29.2% from 45 to 64, and 15.8% who were 65 years of age or older. The median age was 42 years. For every 100 females there were 103.8 males. For every 100 females age 18 and over, there were 101.2 males.

The median income for a household in the township was $36,250, and the median income for a family was $40,132. Males had a median income of $31,875 versus $17,500 for females. The per capita income for the township was $15,986.

Approximately 6.0% of families and 6.6% of the population were living below the poverty line, including 6.2% of those under age 18 and 7.6% of those age 65 or over.
