= Jackson Township, Mercer County, Pennsylvania =

Township in Pennsylvania, US

Coordinates: 41°17′0″N 80°7′59″W

- Township
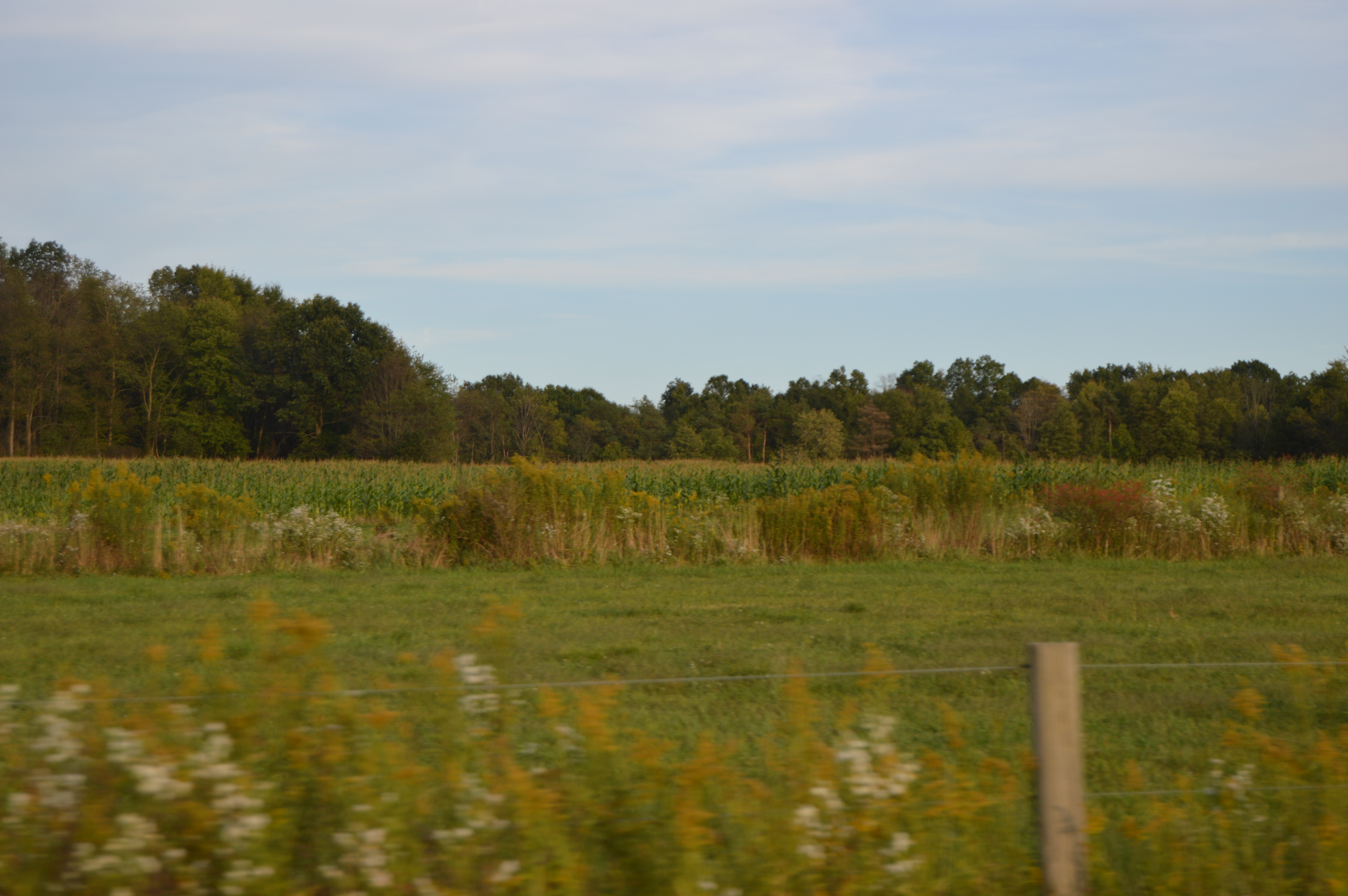
- Cornfield on Foster Road

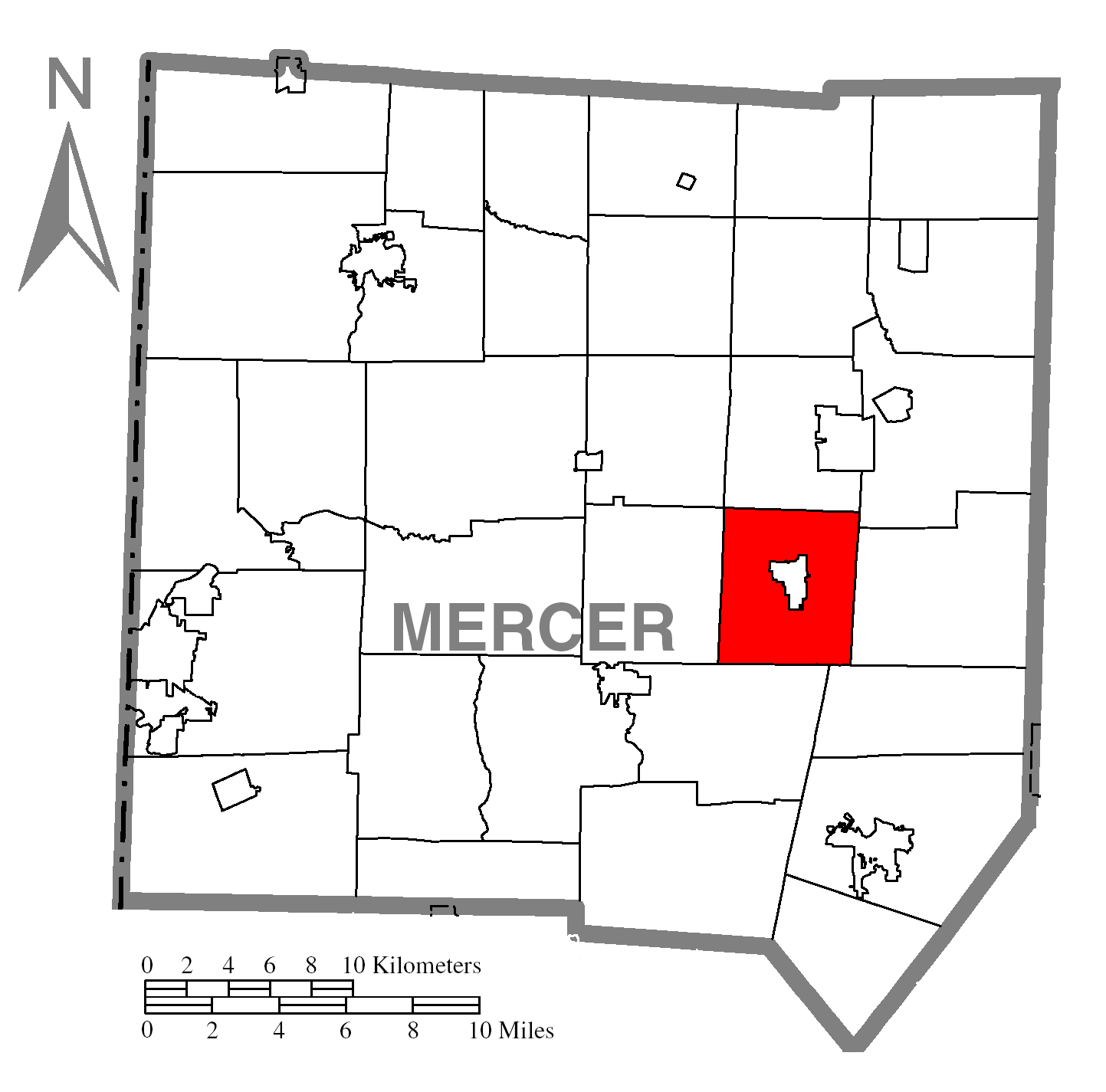
- Location of Jackson Township in Mercer County

- Location of Mercer County in Pennsylvania
- Country: United States
- State: Pennsylvania
- County: Mercer County

Area
  - Total: 17.70 sq mi (45.85 km^{2})
  - Land: 17.51 sq mi (45.34 km^{2})
  - Water: 0.20 sq mi (0.51 km^{2})

Population (2020)
  - Total: 1,182
  - Estimate (2023): 1,184
  - Density: 72.4/sq mi (27.95/km^{2})
- Time zone: UTC-4 (EST)
  - Summer (DST): UTC-5 (EDT)
- Area code: 724
- FIPS code: 42-085-37416
- Website: https://jacksontwpmcpa.gov/

Historical population
| Census | Pop. | Note | %± |
|---|---|---|---|
| 2000 | 1,206 | | — |
| 2010 | 1,273 | | 5.6% |
| 2020 | 1,182 | | −7.1% |
| 2023 (est.) | 1,184 | | 0.2% |
U.S. Decennial Census

Jackson Township is a township in Mercer County, Pennsylvania, United States. The population was 1,181 at the 2020 census, a decrease from the figure of 1,273 in 2010.

== Geography ==
According to the United States Census Bureau, the township has a total area of 17.3 square miles (45 km^{2}), of which 17.1 square miles (44 km^{2}) is land and 0.2 square miles (0.52 km^{2}) (1.04%) is water. It contains part of the census-designated place of Lake Latonka.

== Demographics ==
As of the census of 2000, there were 1,206 people, 452 households, and 358 families residing in the township. The population density was 70.4 inhabitants per square mile (27.2/km^{2}). There were 514 housing units at an average density of 30.0 per square mile (11.6/km^{2}). The racial makeup of the township was 99.17% White, 0.17% Native American, 0.17% from other races, and 0.50% from two or more races. Hispanic or Latino of any race were 0.91% of the population.

There were 452 households, out of which 30.3% had children under the age of 18 living with them, 69.9% were married couples living together, 6.9% had a female householder with no husband present, and 20.6% were non-families. 16.6% of all households were made up of individuals, and 7.5% had someone living alone who was 65 years of age or older. The average household size was 2.67 and the average family size was 3.01.

In the township the population was spread out, with 23.7% under the age of 18, 8.5% from 18 to 24, 26.5% from 25 to 44, 28.2% from 45 to 64, and 13.1% who were 65 years of age or older. The median age was 40 years. For every 100 females there were 100.0 males. For every 100 females age 18 and over, there were 99.6 males.

The median income for a household in the township was $42,574, and the median income for a family was $46,136. Males had a median income of $35,938 versus $21,953 for females. The per capita income for the township was $18,326. About 5.3% of families and 5.4% of the population were below the poverty line, including 6.7% of those under age 18 and 9.0% of those age 65 or over.
