= Fairview Township, Mercer County, Pennsylvania =

Township in Pennsylvania, US

Coordinates: 41°20′00″N 80°13′59″W

- Township
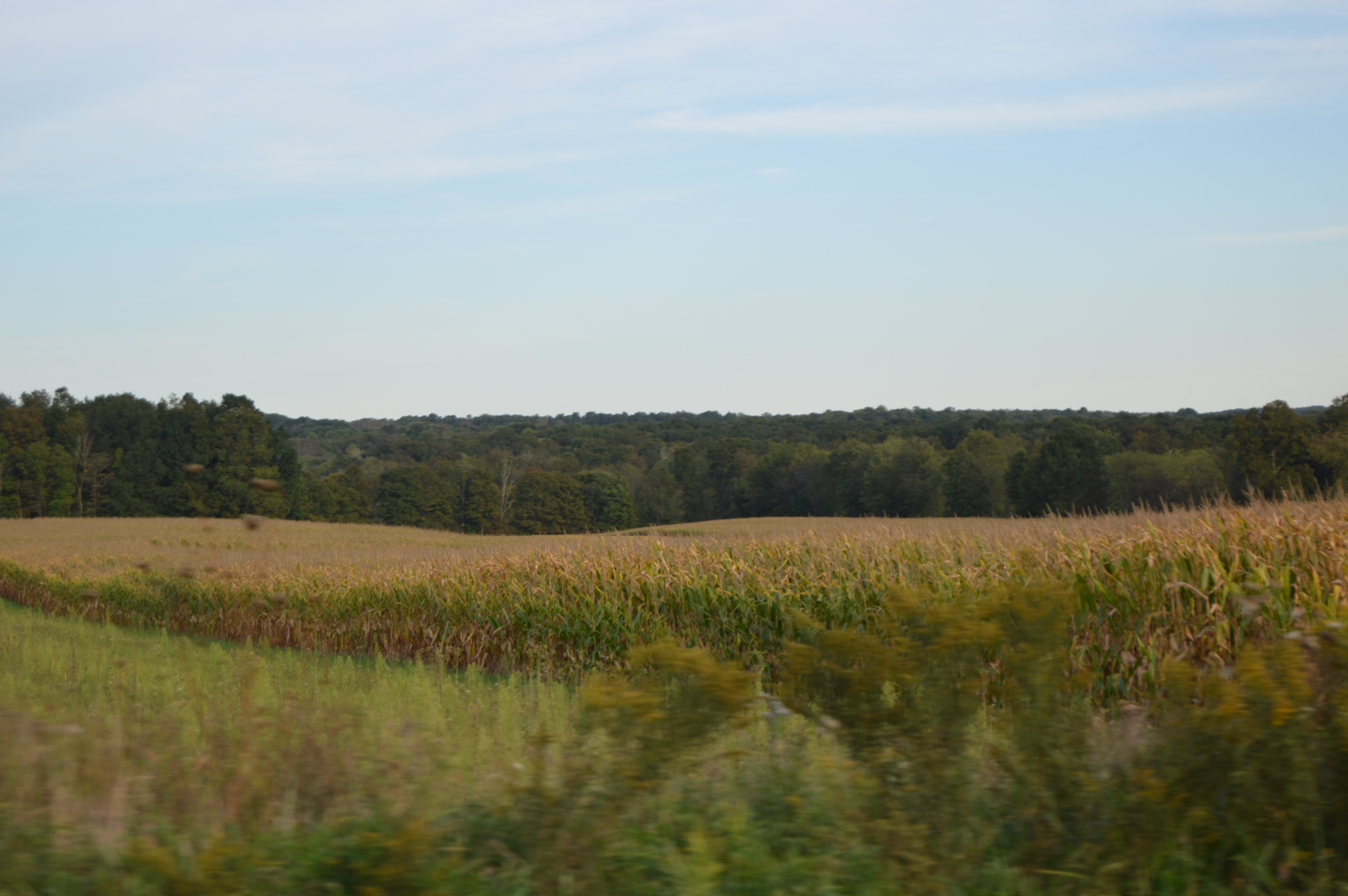
- Cornfield along Airport Road

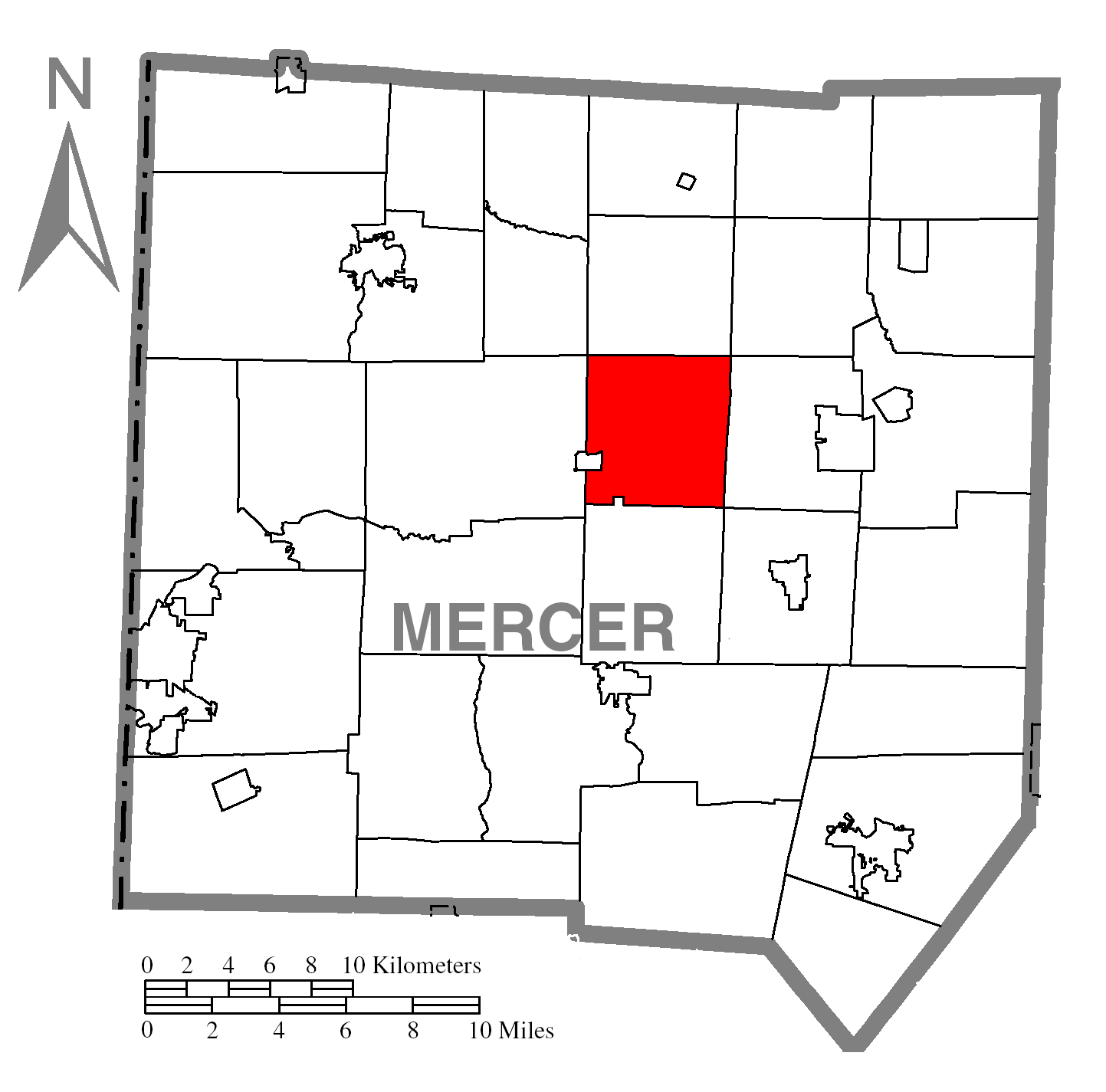
- Location of Fairview Township in Mercer County

- Location of Mercer County in Pennsylvania
- Country: United States
- State: Pennsylvania
- County: Mercer

Area
  - Total: 18.54 sq mi (48.03 km^{2})
  - Land: 18.54 sq mi (48.01 km^{2})
  - Water: 0.0077 sq mi (0.02 km^{2})

Population (2020)
  - Total: 952
  - Estimate (2023): 937
  - Density: 57.1/sq mi (22.04/km^{2})
- Time zone: UTC-4 (EST)
  - Summer (DST): UTC-5 (EDT)
- Area code: 724
- FIPS code: 42-085-24904

Historical population
Census	Pop.	Note	%±
2000	1,036		—
2010	1,085		4.7%
2020	952		−12.3%
2023 (est.)	937		−1.6%
U.S. Decennial Census

Fairview Township is a township in Mercer County, Pennsylvania, United States. The population was 950 at the 2020 census, a decline from the figure of 1,085 in 2010.

== Geography ==
According to the United States Census Bureau, the township has a total area of 18.7 square miles (48 km^{2}), of which 18.7 square miles (48 km^{2}) is land and 0.04 square miles (0.10 km^{2}) (0.11%) is water.

== Demographics ==
As of the census of 2000, there were 1,036 people, 334 households, and 272 families residing in the township. The population density was 55.5 inhabitants per square mile (21.4/km^{2}). There were 354 housing units at an average density of 19.0/sq mi (7.3/km^{2}). The racial makeup of the township was 99.32% White, 0.10% Asian, 0.10% from other races, and 0.48% from two or more races. Hispanic or Latino of any race were 0.39% of the population.

There were 334 households, out of which 38.9% had children under the age of 18 living with them, 73.1% were married couples living together, 4.8% had a female householder with no husband present, and 18.3% were non-families. 13.8% of all households were made up of individuals, and 5.4% had someone living alone who was 65 years of age or older. The average household size was 3.10 and the average family size was 3.47.

In the township the population was spread out, with 32.3% under the age of 18, 8.0% from 18 to 24, 25.8% from 25 to 44, 23.3% from 45 to 64, and 10.6% who were 65 years of age or older. The median age was 33 years. For every 100 females there were 102.7 males. For every 100 females age 18 and over, there were 103.2 males.

The median income for a household in the township was $40,395, and the median income for a family was $41,417. Males had a median income of $30,313 versus $20,391 for females. The per capita income for the township was $14,909. About 10.0% of families and 12.8% of the population were below the poverty line, including 18.7% of those under age 18 and 14.5% of those age 65 or over.
