= Sandy Lake Township, Pennsylvania =

Township in Pennsylvania, US

Coordinates: 41°22′36″N 80°05′59″W

Sandy Lake Township, Mercer County, Pennsylvania
- Township
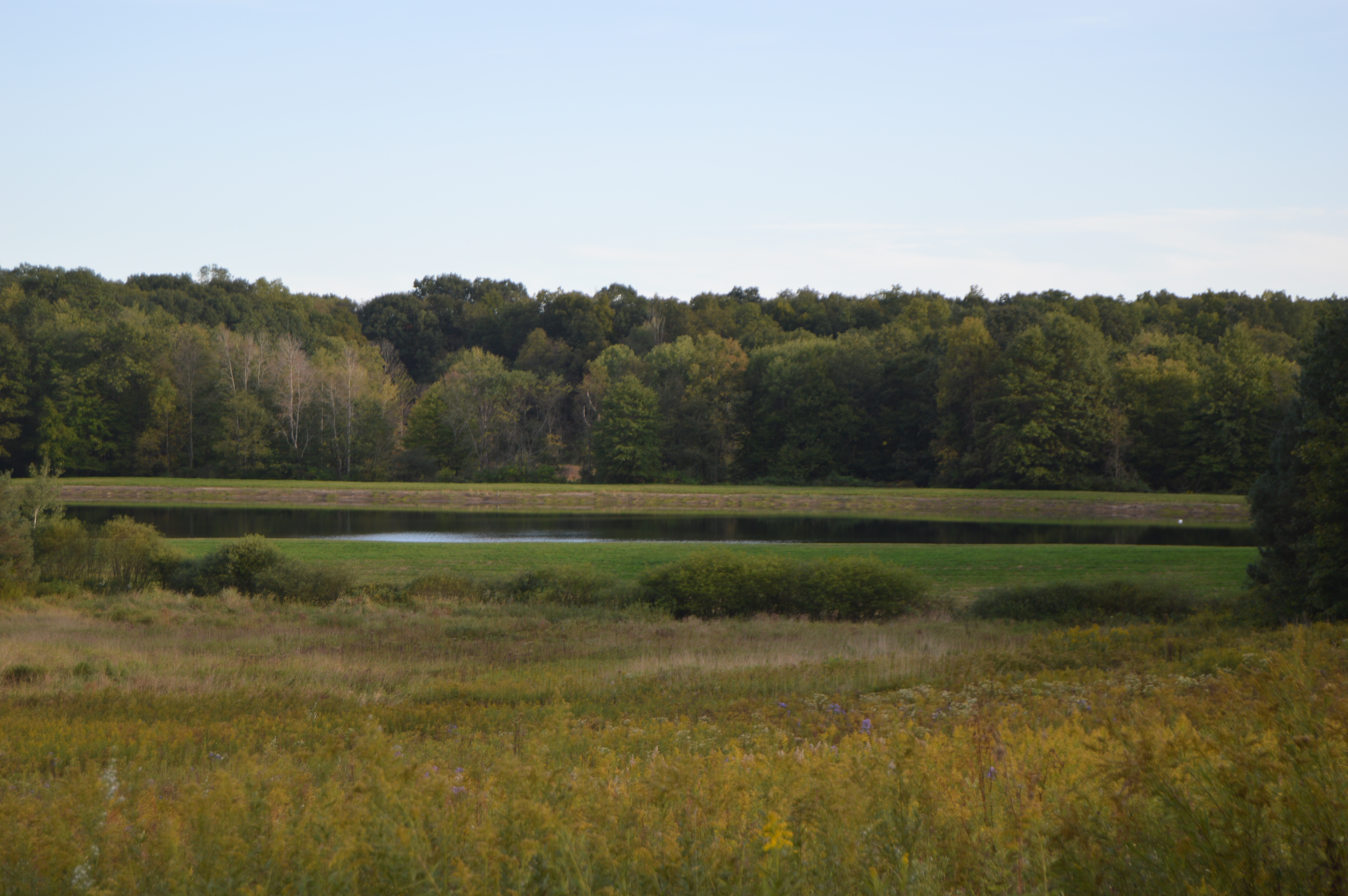
- Pond along Pennsylvania Route 173 north of Sandy Lake

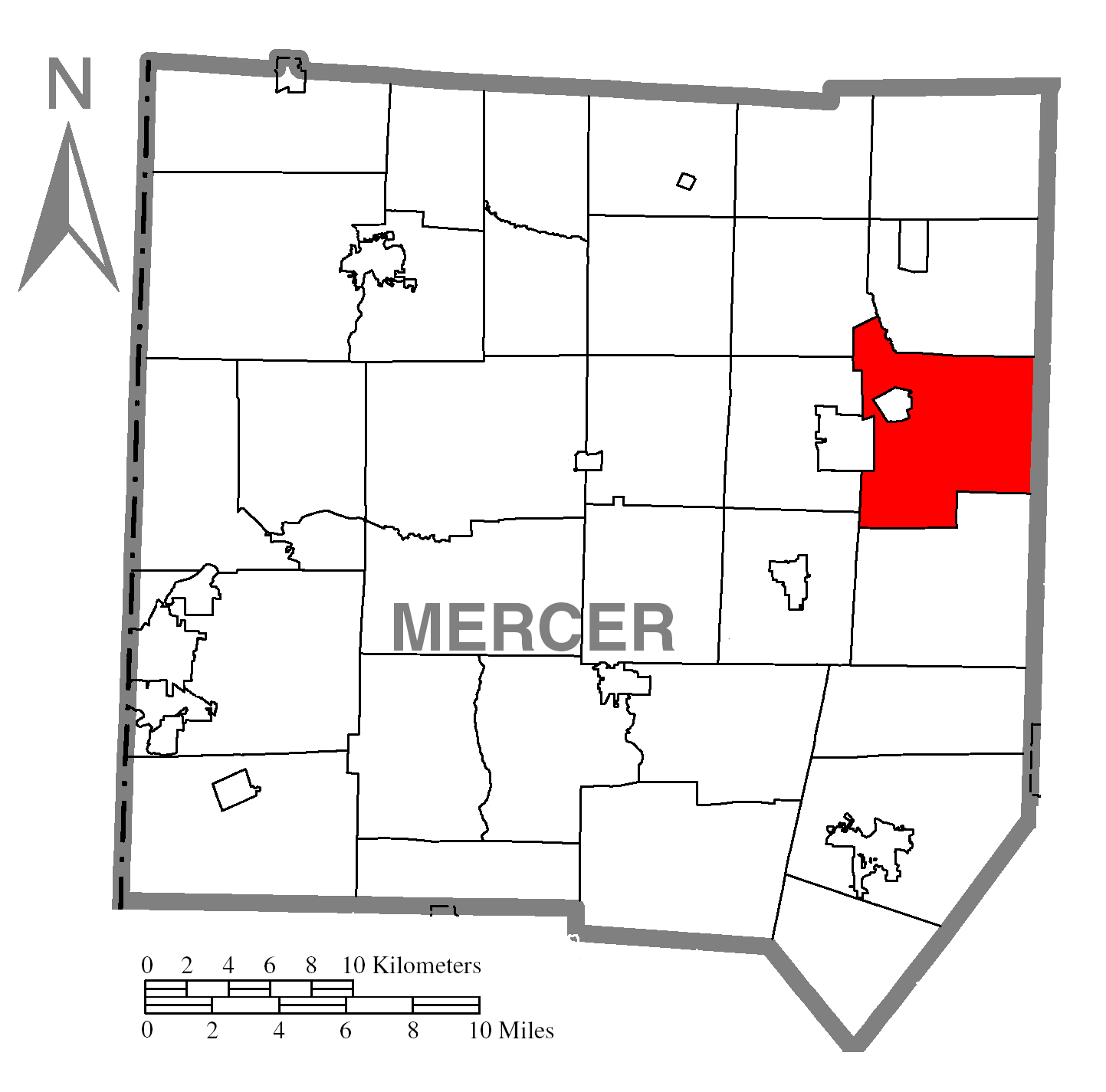
- Location of Sandy Lake Township in Mercer County

- Location of Mercer County in Pennsylvania
- Country: United States
- State: Pennsylvania
- County: Mercer County

Area
  - Total: 24.63 sq mi (63.79 km^{2})
  - Land: 24.38 sq mi (63.14 km^{2})
  - Water: 0.25 sq mi (0.65 km^{2})

Population (2020)
  - Total: 1,198
  - Estimate (2022): 1,190
  - Density: 48.5/sq mi (18.74/km^{2})
- Time zone: UTC-4 (EST)
  - Summer (DST): UTC-5 (EDT)
- Area code: 724
- FIPS code: 42-085-67856

Historical population
Census	Pop.	Note	%±
2000	1,248		—
2010	1,226		−1.8%
2020	1,197		−2.4%
2022 (est.)	1,190		−0.6%
U.S. Decennial Census

Sandy Lake Township is a township that is located in Mercer County, Pennsylvania, United States. The population was 1,197 at the time of the 2020 census, a decline from the figure of 1,226 that was documented in 2010.

== Geography ==
According to the United States Census Bureau, the township has a total area of 24.8 square miles (64.1 km^{2}), of which 24.5 square miles (63.4 km^{2}) is land and 0.3 square mile (0.7 km^{2} (1.09%)) is water.

== Demographics ==
As of the census of 2000, there were 1,248 people, 499 households, and 375 families residing in the township.

The population density was 51.0 inhabitants per square mile (19.7/km^{2}). There were 515 housing units at an average density of 21.0/sq mi (8.1/km^{2}).

The racial makeup of the township was 99.20% White, 0.16% African American, 0.08% Native American, 0.08% from other races, and 0.48% from two or more races. Hispanic or Latino of any race were 0.40% of the population.

There were 499 households, out of which 29.7% had children under the age of 18 living with them, 64.7% were married couples living together, 6.2% had a female householder with no husband present, and 24.8% were non-families. 21.6% of all households were made up of individuals, and 10.0% had someone living alone who was 65 years of age or older.

The average household size was 2.50 and the average family size was 2.89.

In the township the population was spread out, with 23.2% under the age of 18, 5.4% from 18 to 24, 27.7% from 25 to 44, 27.8% from 45 to 64, and 15.9% who were 65 years of age or older. The median age was 42 years.

For every 100 females there were 96.8 males. For every 100 females age 18 and over, there were 94.3 males.

The median income for a household in the township was $39,896, and the median income for a family was $46,528. Males had a median income of $38,056 versus $21,324 for females.

The per capita income for the township was $19,140.

Approximately 7.1% of families and 10.8% of the population were living below the poverty line, including 15.9% of those under age 18 and 6.7% of those age 65 or over.
