= Otter Creek Township, Pennsylvania =

Township in Pennsylvania, US

Coordinates: 41°24′00″N 80°17′59″W

Otter Creek Township, Mercer County, Pennsylvania
- Township
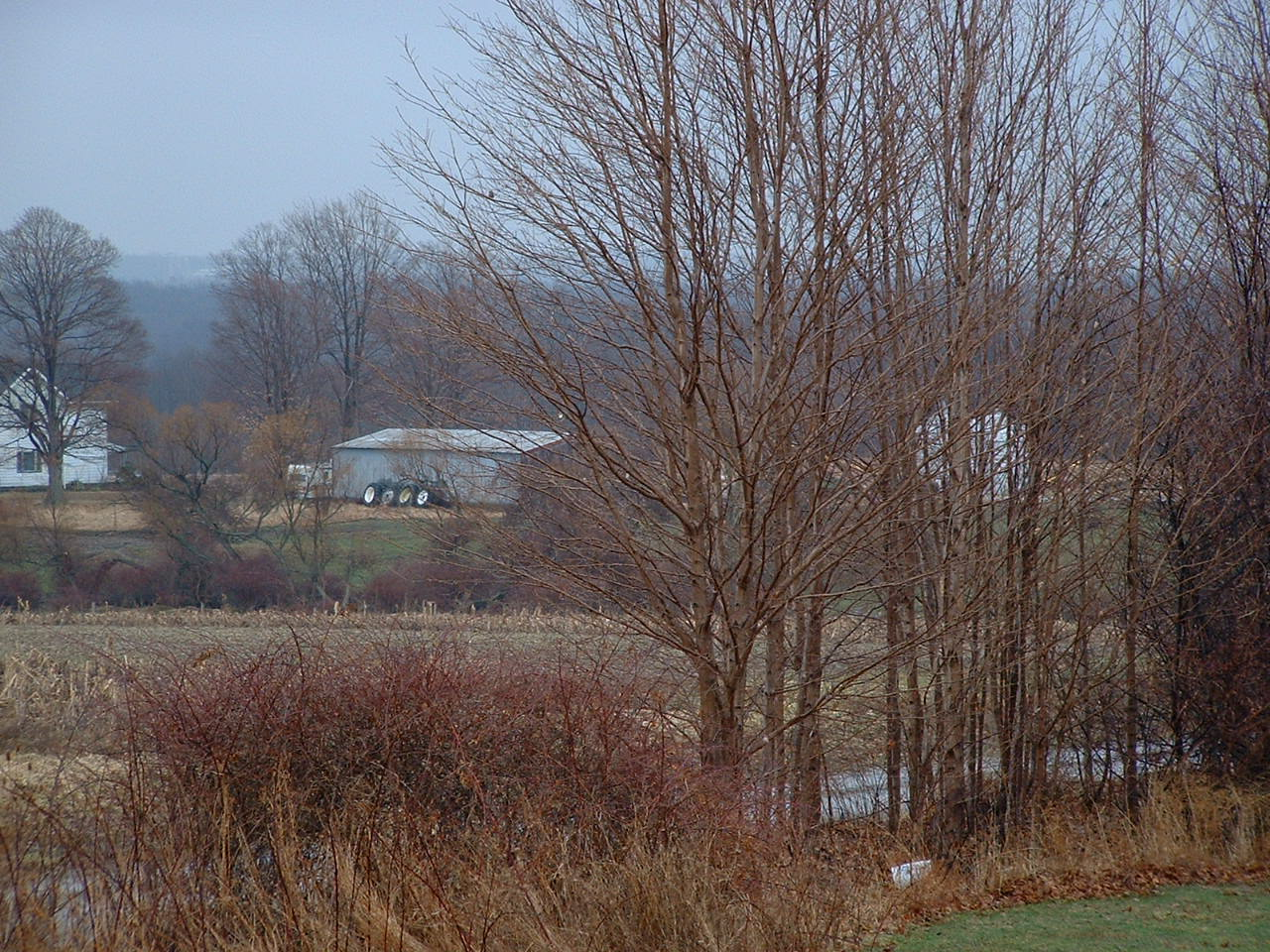

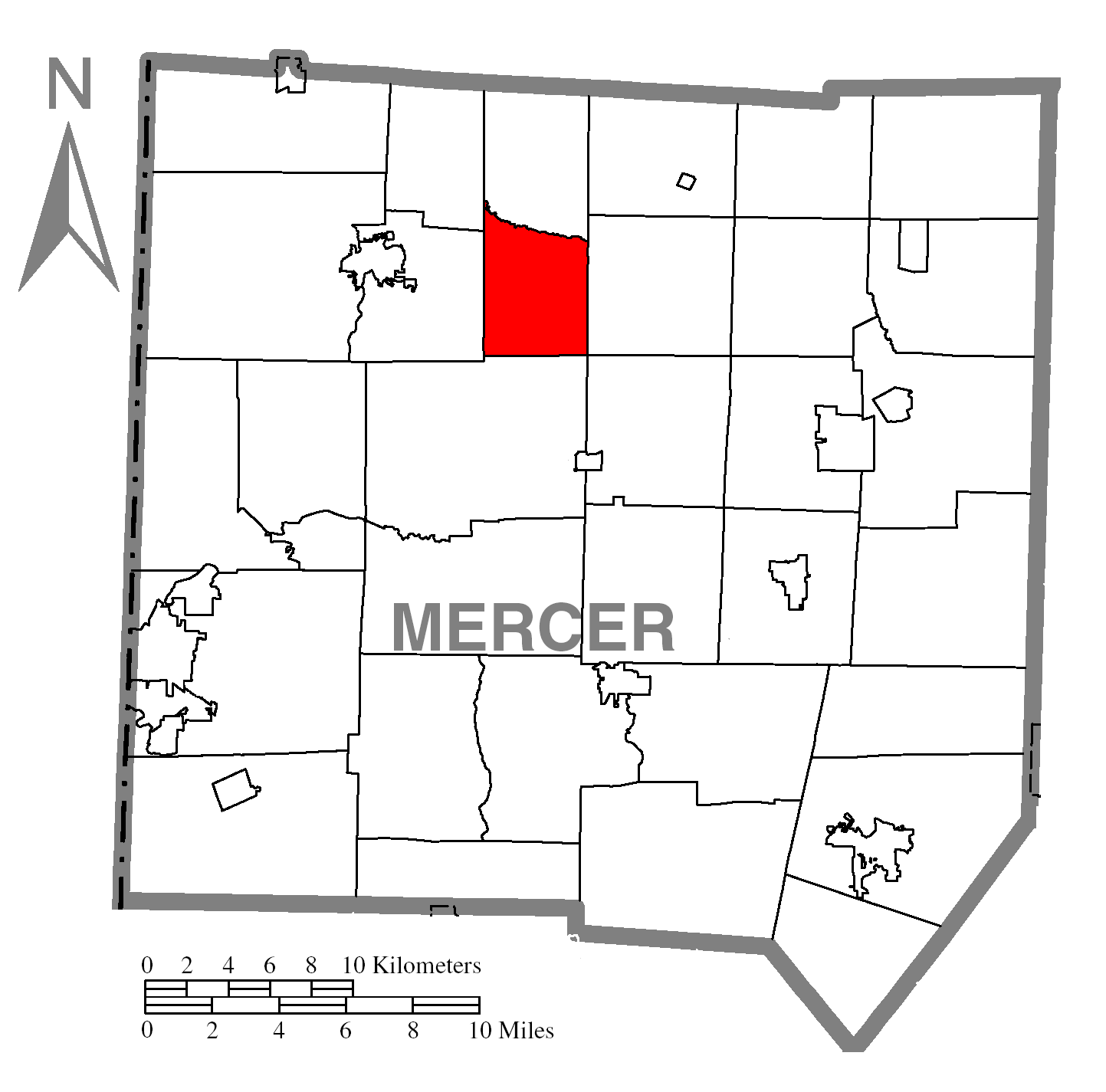
- Location of Otter Creek Township in Mercer County

- Location of Mercer County in Pennsylvania
- Country: United States
- State: Pennsylvania
- County: Mercer

Area
  - Total: 11.82 sq mi (30.61 km^{2})
  - Land: 11.81 sq mi (30.60 km^{2})
  - Water: 0.0039 sq mi (0.01 km^{2})

Population (2020)
  - Total: 525
  - Estimate (2022): 518
  - Density: 48.1/sq mi (18.59/km^{2})
- Time zone: UTC-4 (EST)
  - Summer (DST): UTC-5 (EDT)
- Area code: 724
- FIPS code: 42-085-57304

Historical population
Census	Pop.	Note	%±
2000	611		—
2010	589		−3.6%
2020	525		−10.9%
2022 (est.)	518		−1.3%
U.S. Decennial Census

Otter Creek Township is a township in Mercer County, Pennsylvania, United States. The population was 525 at the 2020 census, down from 589 in 2010. Otter Creek Township received its name due to the creek's substantial otter population.

== Geography ==
According to the United States Census Bureau, the township has a total area of 11.8 square miles (30.6 km^{2}), all land.

== Demographics ==
As of the census of 2000, there were 611 people, 229 households, and 172 families residing in the township. The population density was 51.8 inhabitants per square mile (20.0/km^{2}). There were 246 housing units at an average density of 20.8/sq mi (8.0/km^{2}). The racial makeup of the township was 97.87% White, 1.15% African American, 0.16% Asian, and 0.82% from two or more races. Hispanic or Latino of any race were 0.33% of the population.

There were 229 households, out of which 33.6% had children under the age of 18 living with them, 65.1% were married couples living together, 6.6% had a female householder with no husband present, and 24.5% were non-families. 18.8% of all households were made up of individuals, and 9.2% had someone living alone who was 65 years of age or older. The average household size was 2.67 and the average family size was 3.06.

In the township the population was spread out, with 26.0% under the age of 18, 4.7% from 18 to 24, 32.4% from 25 to 44, 24.2% from 45 to 64, and 12.6% who were 65 years of age or older. The median age was 39 years. For every 100 females there were 105.7 males. For every 100 females age 18 and over, there were 97.4 males.

The median income for a household in the township was $37,656, and the median income for a family was $41,625. Males had a median income of $36,477 versus $18,917 for females. The per capita income for the township was $16,203. About 3.5% of families and 5.4% of the population were below the poverty line, including 4.4% of those under age 18 and 2.3% of those age 65 or over.
