= Jackson Center, Pennsylvania =

Borough in Pennsylvania, US

- Borough
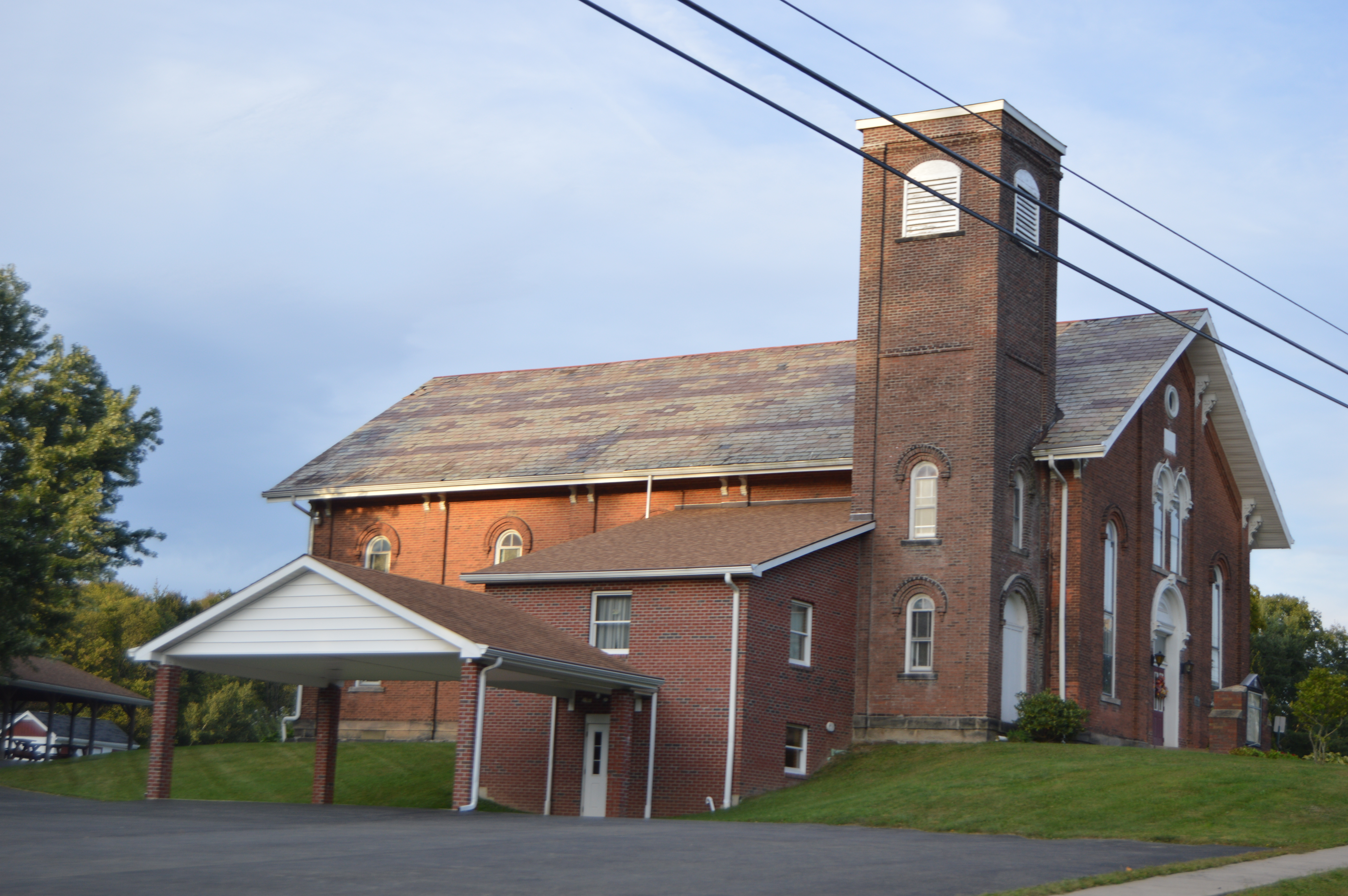
- Presbyterian church

- Location of Jackson Center in Mercer County, Pennsylvania.
- Coordinates: 41°16′15″N 80°8′36″W
- Country: United States
- State: Pennsylvania
- County: Mercer
- Established: 1882

Area
  - Total: 1.14 sq mi (2.95 km^{2})
  - Land: 1.14 sq mi (2.95 km^{2})
  - Water: 0 sq mi (0.00 km^{2})
- Elevation (middle of borough): 1,318 ft (402 m)
- Highest elevation (eastern border): 1,330 ft (410 m)
- Lowest elevation (Yellow Creek): 1,220 ft (370 m)

Population (2020)
  - Total: 194
  - Density: 170.4/sq mi (65.81/km^{2})
- Time zone: UTC-4 (EST)
  - Summer (DST): UTC-5 (EDT)
- Zip code: 16133
- Area code: 724
- FIPS code: 42-37496

Jackson Center is a borough in eastern Mercer County, Pennsylvania, United States. The population was 192 at the 2020 census. It is part of the Hermitage micropolitan area.

== Geography ==
Jackson Center is located at 41°16′15″N 80°8′36″W (41.270727, -80.143362).

According to the United States Census Bureau, the borough has a total area of 1.1 square miles (2.8 km^{2}), all land.

== Demographics ==
Historical population
Census	Pop.	Note	%±
1890	232		—
1900	276		19.0%
1910	269		−2.5%
1920	260		−3.3%
1930	243		−6.5%
1940	268		10.3%
1950	266		−0.7%
1960	640		140.6%
1970	274		−57.2%
1980	265		−3.3%
1990	244		−7.9%
2000	221		−9.4%
2010	224		1.4%
2020	194		−13.4%
2021 (est.)	190	▼	−2.1%

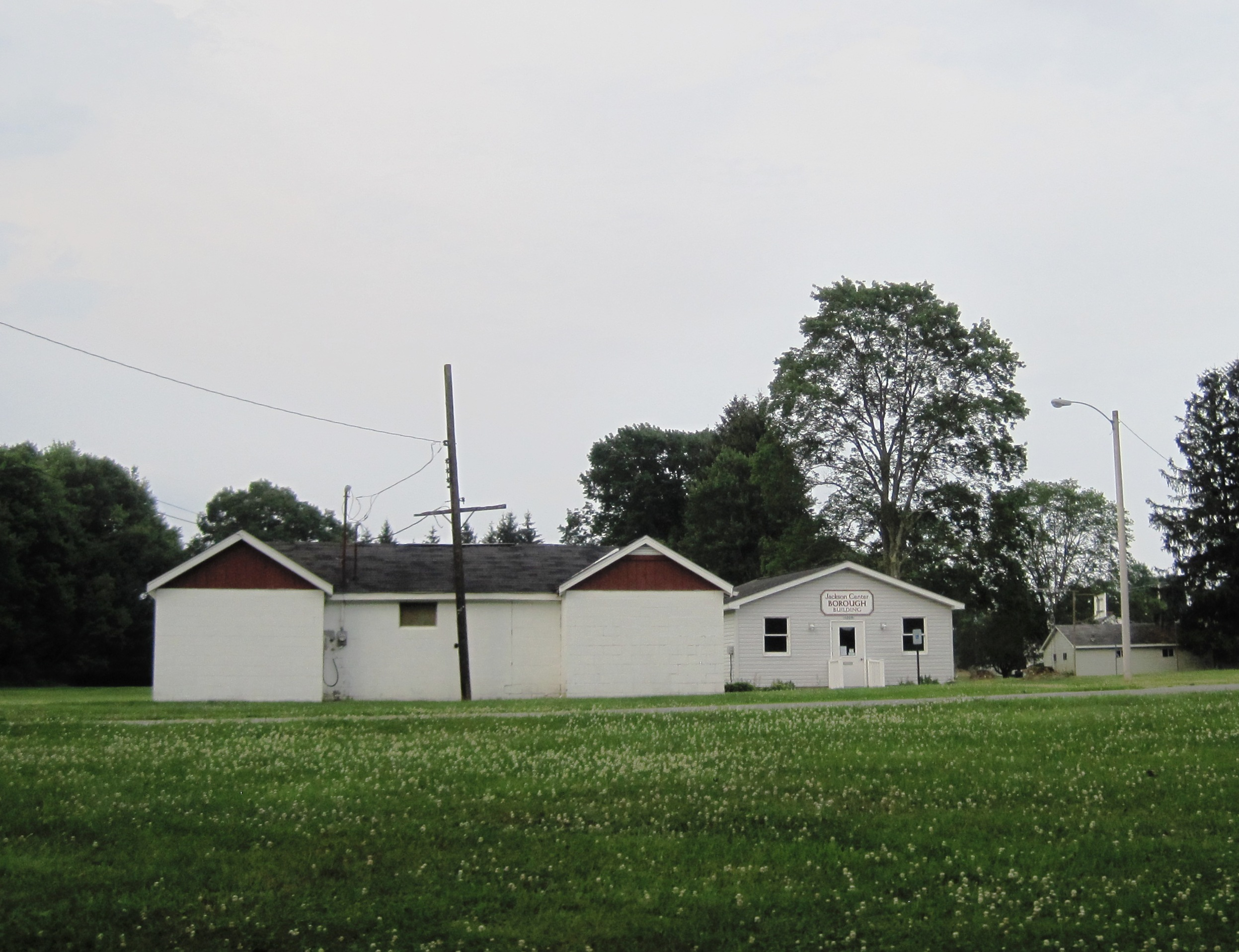
Jackson Center Borough Building

As of the census of 2000, there were 221 people, 81 households and 61 families residing in the borough. The population density was 193.3 inhabitants per square mile (74.6/km^{2}). There were 85 housing units at an average density of 74.4 per square mile (28.7/km^{2}). The racial makeup of the borough was 100.00% White. Hispanic or Latino of any race were 0.45% of the population.

There were 81 households, of which 39.5% had children under the age of 18 living with them, 54.3% were married couples living together, 11.1% had a female householder with no husband present, and 23.5% were non-families. 18.5% of all households were made up of individuals, and 7.4% had someone living alone who was 65 years of age or older. The average household size was 2.70 and the average family size was 3.05.

In the borough the population was spread out, with 28.5% under the age of 18, 9.0% from 18 to 24, 33.9% from 25 to 44, 17.2% from 45 to 64, and 11.3% who were 65 years of age or older. The median age was 32 years. For every 100 females there were 84.2 males. For every 100 females age 18 and over, there were 92.7 males.

The median income for a household in the borough was $35,625, and the median income for a family was $41,875. Males had a median income of $45,893 versus $25,625 for females. The per capita income for the borough was $15,721. About 7.7% of families and 8.1% of the population were below the poverty line, including 7.9% of those under the age of eighteen and 9.1% of those sixty five or over.
