= Mill Creek Township, Mercer County, Pennsylvania =

Township in Pennsylvania, US

Coordinates: 41°25′00″N 80°01′59″W

- Township
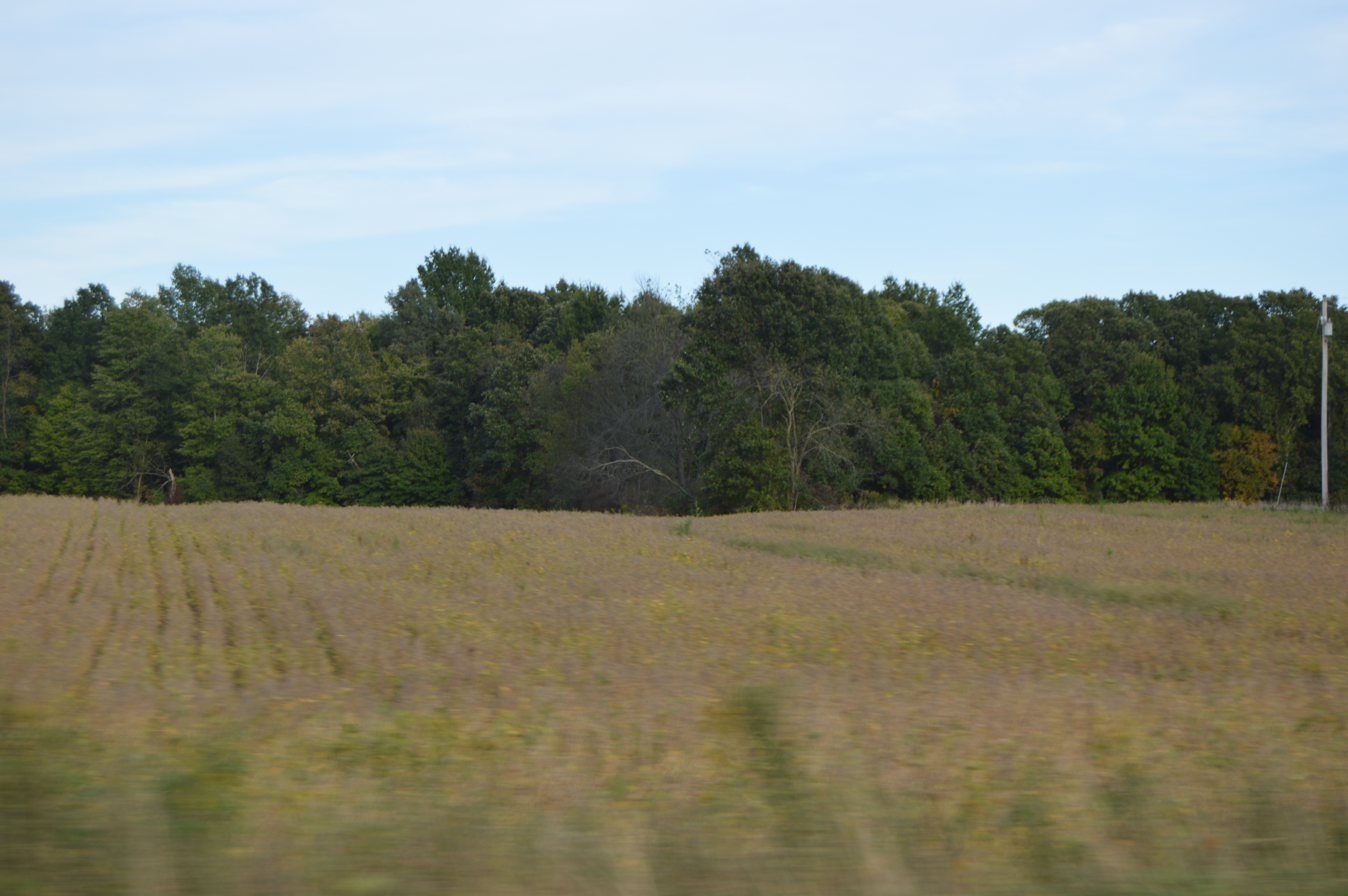
- Soybean field along Pennsylvania Route 173

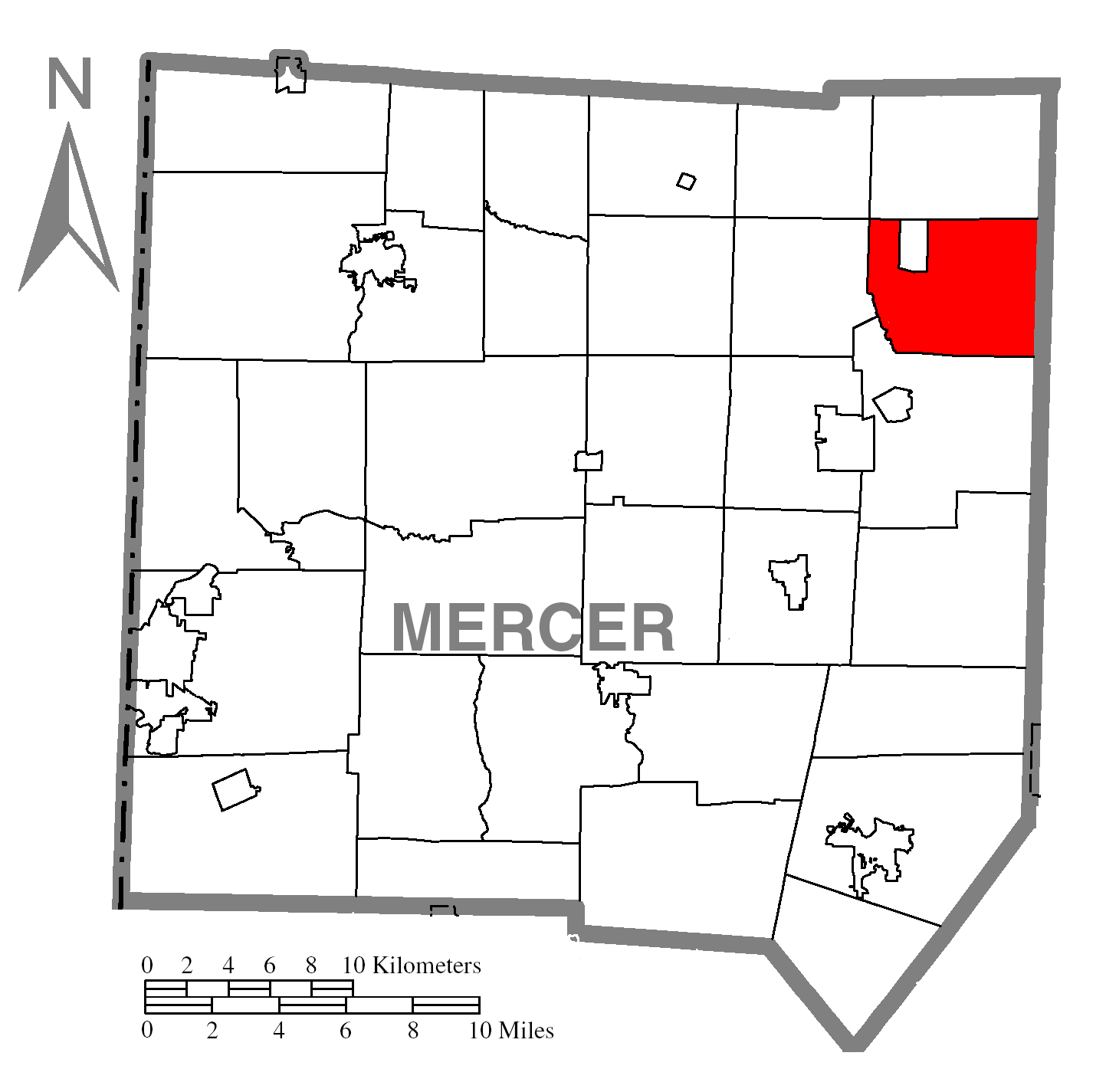
- Location of Mill Creek Township in Mercer County

- Location of Mercer County in Pennsylvania
- Country: United States
- State: Pennsylvania
- County: Mercer

Area
  - Total: 19.39 sq mi (50.21 km^{2})
  - Land: 18.99 sq mi (49.19 km^{2})
  - Water: 0.39 sq mi (1.02 km^{2})

Population (2020)
  - Total: 776
  - Estimate (2023): 766
  - Density: 37.3/sq mi (14.39/km^{2})
- Time zone: UTC-4 (EST)
  - Summer (DST): UTC-5 (EDT)
- Area code: 724
- FIPS code: 42-085-49576

Historical population
Census	Pop.	Note	%±
2000	639		—
2010	721		12.8%
2020	776		7.6%
2023 (est.)	766		−1.3%
U.S. Decennial Census

Mill Creek Township is a township in Mercer County, Pennsylvania, United States. The population was 776 at the 2020 census, down from 721 in 2010.

== Geography ==
According to the United States Census Bureau, the township has a total area of 19.3 square miles (50.1 km^{2}), of which 18.9 square miles (49.0 km^{2}) is land and 0.4 square mile (1.1 km^{2}) (2.12%) is water.

== Demographics ==
As of the census of 2000, there were 639 people, 243 households, and 185 families residing in the township. The population density was 33.7 inhabitants per square mile (13.0/km^{2}). There were 265 housing units at an average density of 14.0/sq mi (5.4/km^{2}). The racial makeup of the township was 98.75% White, 0.63% African American, 0.16% from other races, and 0.47% from two or more races. Hispanic or Latino of any race were 0.16% of the population.

There were 243 households, out of which 34.6% had children under the age of 18 living with them, 65.8% were married couples living together, 7.8% had a female householder with no husband present, and 23.5% were non-families. 20.2% of all households were made up of individuals, and 8.6% had someone living alone who was 65 years of age or older. The average household size was 2.59 and the average family size was 2.97.

In the township the population was spread out, with 25.2% under the age of 18, 7.2% from 18 to 24, 27.4% from 25 to 44, 26.4% from 45 to 64, and 13.8% who were 65 years of age or older. The median age was 38 years. For every 100 females there were 100.9 males. For every 100 females age 18 and over, there were 99.2 males.

The median income for a household in the township was $39,219, and the median income for a family was $41,023. Males had a median income of $30,903 versus $23,125 for females. The per capita income for the township was $16,928. About 5.0% of families and 7.7% of the population were below the poverty line, including 9.0% of those under age 18 and 2.2% of those age 65 or over.
