= Pennsylvania Route 358 =

State highway in Mercer County, Pennsylvania, US

Pennsylvania Route 358

Route information
- Maintained by PennDOT
- Length: 25.2 mi (40.6 km)

Major junctions
- West end: SR 88 at Ohio state line in West Salem Township
- US 19 in Perry Township; I-79 near Sandy Lake
- East end: US 62 / PA 173 in Sandy Lake

Location
- Country: United States
- State: Pennsylvania
- Counties: Mercer

Highway system
- Pennsylvania State Route System; Interstate; US; State; Scenic; Legislative
← PA 356	→ PA 359

Pennsylvania Route 358 (PA 358) is located in Western Pennsylvania, running from the Ohio state line 6 miles (9.7 km) west of Greenville to Sandy Lake in Mercer County.

== Route description ==
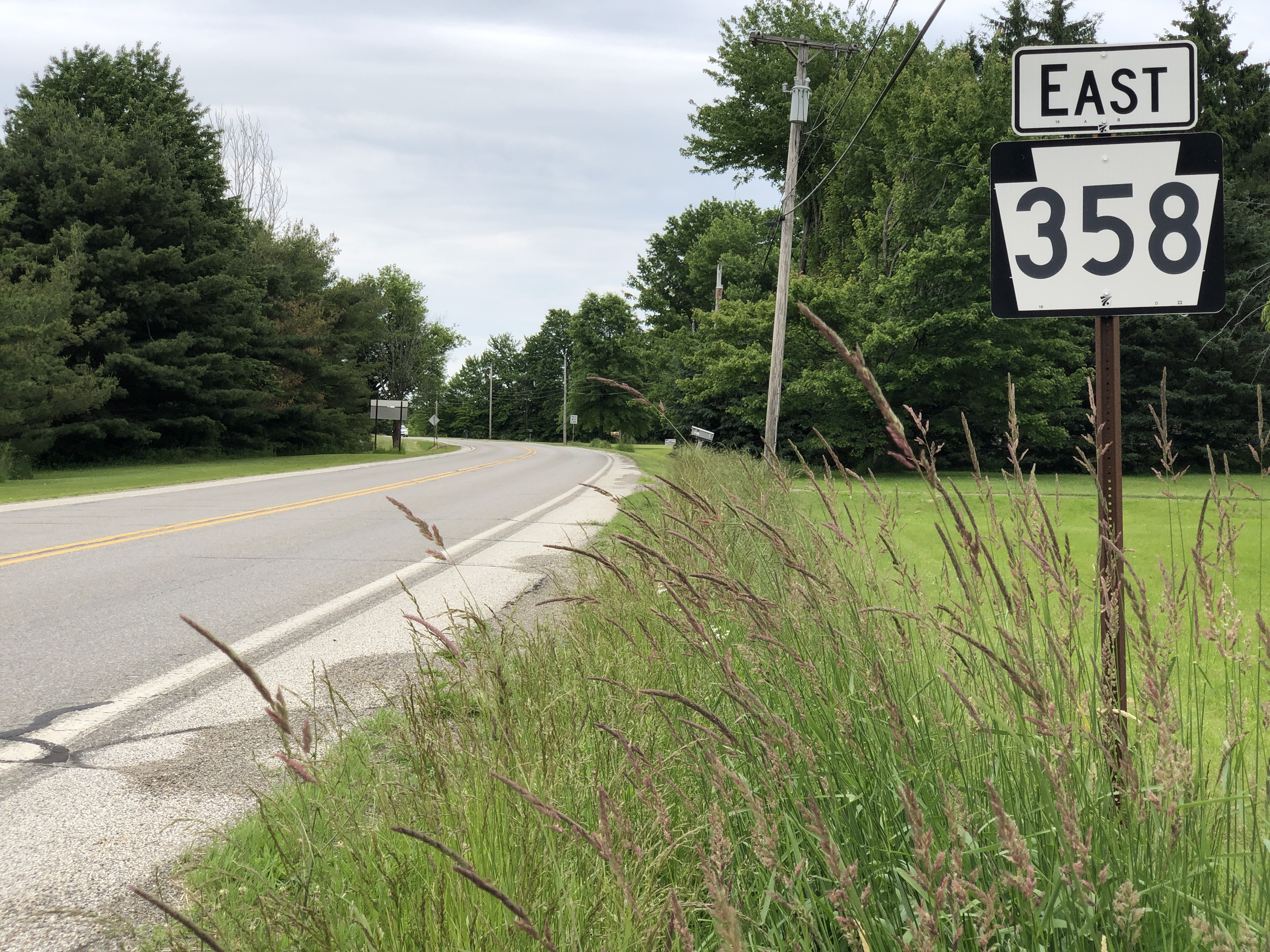
PA 358 eastbound in West Salem Township

Heading east from the Ohio state line in Mercer County, PA 358 travels through the village of Maysville about 3.4 miles (5.5 km) from the state line. Next the route enters the borough of Greenville about 3.3 miles (5.3 km) later, and intersects with PA 18, which joins PA 358 through the borough about 0.5 miles (0.80 km). East of downtown, PA 58 joins the concurrency for 0.3 miles (0.48 km), and then both PA 18 and PA 58 leave PA 358. The route continues out of Greenville, and passes near the village of Hadley about 7.8 miles (12.6 km) later, and then intersects with US 19 about 1.5 miles (2.4 km) after that. About 2.3 miles (3.7 km) later, the route passes through the village of Clarks Mills, and then interchanges with I-79 1.4 miles (2.3 km) later. PA 358 continues 2.4 miles (3.9 km), where it intersects with the north terminus of PA 845 north of Stoneboro, and then the route terminates another 2.3 miles (3.7 km) later in the borough of Sandy Lake at the north terminus of the US 62/PA 173 concurrency.

== History ==
In 1928, PA 358 was originally signed from the Ohio state line to Greenville. The Greenville-to-Sandy Lake alignment was originally signed PA 846 through 1936. The eastern terminus was moved from Greenville to its current location in 1936. In 1954, the eastern terminus was moved back to Greenville. The Greenville-to-Sandy Lake alignment was signed Alternate US 322 through 1964. In 1964, the eastern terminus was moved back to its current location.

== Major intersections ==
The entire route is in Mercer County.

Location	mi	km	Destinations	Notes
West Salem Township	0.0	0.0	SR 88 west	Ohio state line; western terminus of PA 358
Greenville	6.7	10.8	PA 18 south (Clarksville Street) – Hermitage, Sharon	Western terminus of PA 18 concurrency
Greenville	7.2	11.6	PA 58 east (South Mercer Street)	Western terminus of PA 58 concurrency
Greenville	7.4	11.9	PA 18 north / PA 58 west (College Avenue)	Eastern terminus of PA 18 / PA 58 concurrency
Perry Township	16.7	26.9	US 19 (Perry Highway) – Mercer, Meadville	
New Vernon Township	20.5	33.0	I-79 – Pittsburgh, Erie	Exit 130 (I-79)
Lake Township	22.9	36.9	PA 845 south (Linden Street) – Stoneboro	Northern terminus of PA 845
Sandy Lake	25.2	40.6	US 62 / PA 173 (Main Street / Franklin Street)	Eastern terminus of PA 358
1.000 mi = 1.609 km; 1.000 km = 0.621 mi: Concurrency terminus
