= Cross Creek Township, Pennsylvania =

Township in Pennsylvania, US

Coordinates: 40°17′41″N 80°25′17″W

Cross Creek Township
- Township
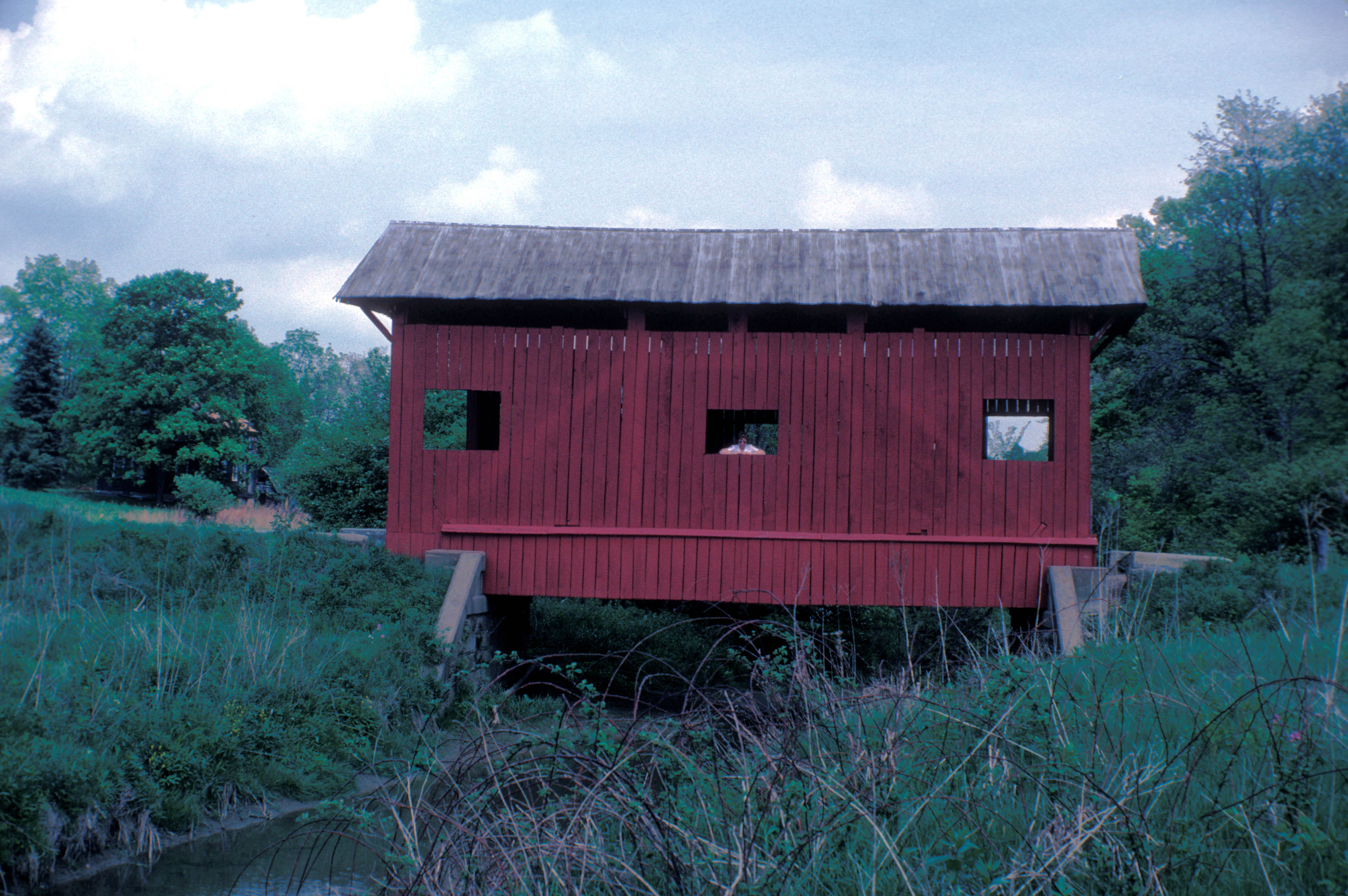
- Wilson's Mill Covered Bridge

- Logo

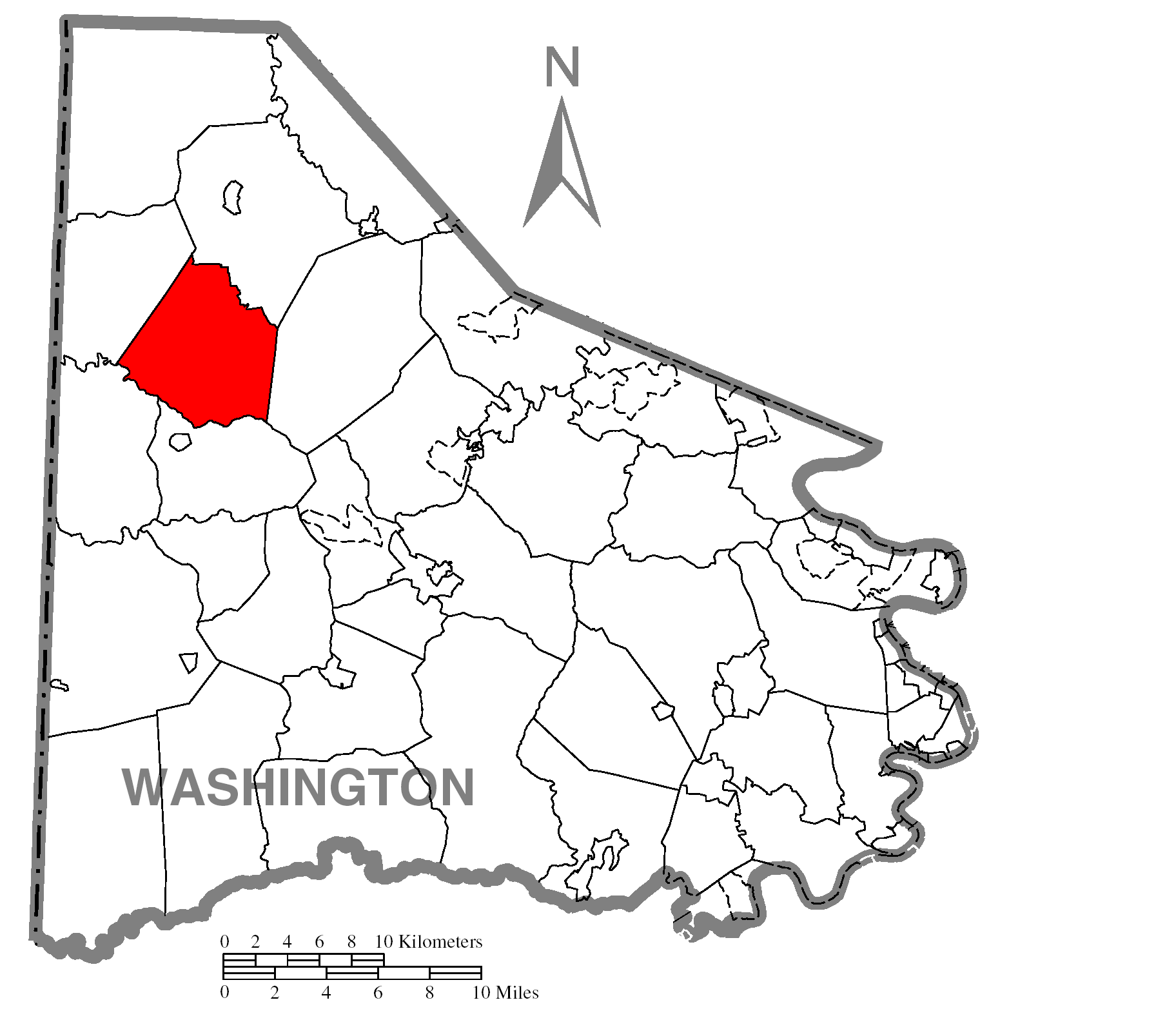
- Location of Cross Creek Township in Washington County

- Location of Washington County in Pennsylvania
- Country: United States
- State: Pennsylvania
- County: Washington
- Established: 1789

Area
  - Total: 27.59 sq mi (71.46 km^{2})
  - Land: 27.59 sq mi (71.46 km^{2})
  - Water: 0 sq mi (0.00 km^{2})

Population (2020)
  - Total: 1,374 ▼
  - Estimate (2023): 1,366
  - Density: 54/sq mi (21/km^{2})
- Time zone: UTC-4 (EST)
  - Summer (DST): UTC-5 (EDT)
- Area code: 724
- FIPS code: 42-125-17314
- Website: www.crosscreektwp.org

Historical population
Census	Pop.	Note	%±
2000	1,685		—
2010	1,556		−7.7%
2020	1,374		−11.7%
2025 (est.)	1,358		−1.2%
U.S. Decennial Census

Cross Creek Township is a township in Washington County, Pennsylvania, United States. The population was 1,374, as per the 2020 census.

== History ==
The Wilson's Mill Covered Bridge was listed on the National Register of Historic Places in 1979.

== Geography ==
According to the United States Census Bureau, the township has a total area of 26.0 square miles (67 km^{2}), all land. It contains the census-designated place of Cross Creek, and also contains parts of Avella, Pennsylvania.

== Surrounding communities ==
Cross Creek Township has five borders, including the townships of Smith to the north, Mount Pleasant to the east, Hopewell to the south, Independence to the southwest and Jefferson to the west and northwest.

== Demographics ==
At the 2000 census there were 1,685 people, 623 households, and 479 families living in the township. The population density was 64.8 people per square mile (25.0 people/km^{2}). There were 660 housing units at an average density of 25.4 per square mile (9.8/km^{2}). The racial makeup of the township was 98.16% White, 0.89% African American, 0.12% Pacific Islander, and 0.83% from two or more races. Hispanic or Latino of any race were 0.12%.

Of the 623 households 31.5% had children under the age of 18 living with them, 63.6% were married couples living together, 9.1% had a female householder with no husband present, and 23.1% were non-families. 20.1% of households were one person and 11.1% were one person aged 65 or older. The average household size was 2.67 and the average family size was 3.09.

The age distribution was 23.9% under the age of 18, 6.3% from 18 to 24, 29.5% from 25 to 44, 24.9% from 45 to 64, and 15.5% 65 or older. The median age was 40 years. For every 100 females there were 101.1 males. For every 100 females age 18 and over, there were 95.6 males.

The median household income was $38,226 and the median family income was $42,813. Males had a median income of $33,958 versus $20,682 for females. The per capita income for the township was $17,654. About 4.7% of families and 7.7% of the population were below the poverty line, including 9.3% of those under age 18 and 9.4% of those age 65 or over.
