= Pennsylvania Route 845 =

State highway in Mercer County, Pennsylvania, US

Pennsylvania Route 845

Route information
- Maintained by PennDOT
- Length: 3.03 mi (4.88 km)
- Existed: 1928–present

Major junctions
- South end: US 62 in Stoneboro
- North end: PA 358 in Lake Township

Location
- Country: United States
- State: Pennsylvania
- Counties: Mercer

Highway system
- Pennsylvania State Route System; Interstate; US; State; Scenic; Legislative
← PA 844	→ PA 846

Pennsylvania Route 845 (PA 845) is a 3.03-mile-long (4.88 km) state highway located in Mercer County, Pennsylvania. The southern terminus is at US 62 in Stoneboro. The northern terminus is at PA 358 in Lake Township.

== Route description ==
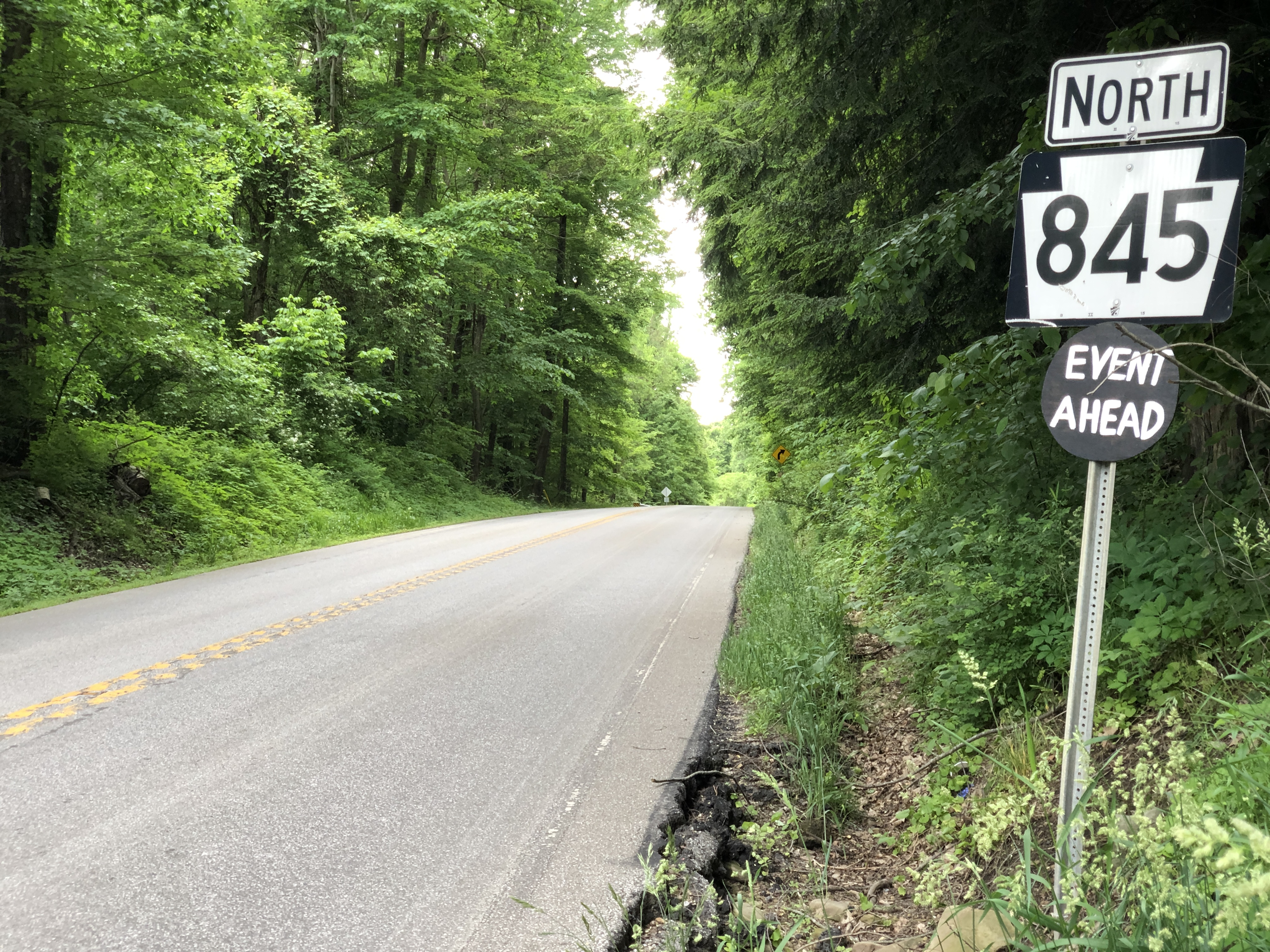
PA 845 northbound in Lake Township

PA 845 begins at an intersection with US 62 in Sandy Lake Township, heading west on two-lane undivided Walnut Street. The road runs through wooded areas with some homes, heading into the borough of Stoneboro. Here, the route passes several homes, briefly turning north onto Franklin Street before heading west on Linden Street. PA 845 curves northwest onto Linden Road, entering forested areas. The route turns north as it passes to the west of Sandy Lake. PA 845 heads into Lake Township and becomes Stoneboro Lateral Road, running through a mix of farmland and woodland with a few residences. The route reaches its northern terminus at an intersection with PA 358.

== Major intersections ==
The entire route is in Mercer County.

Location	mi	km	Destinations	Notes
Sandy Lake Township	0.00	0.00	US 62 (Mercer Street) – Sandy Lake, Sharon	Southern terminus
Lake Township	3.03	4.88	PA 358 (Sandy Lake Greenville Road) – Sandy Lake, Greenville	Northern terminus
1.000 mi = 1.609 km; 1.000 km = 0.621 mi
