= Pennsylvania Route 844 =

State highway in Washington County, Pennsylvania, US

Pennsylvania Route 844

Route information
- Maintained by PennDOT
- Length: 14.970 mi (24.092 km)
- Existed: September 1964–present

Major junctions
- West end: WV 27 at the West Virginia state line in Independence Township
- PA 50 in Independence Township; PA 231 in Independence Township; PA 331 in Canton Township
- East end: PA 18 in Washington

Location
- Country: United States
- State: Pennsylvania
- Counties: Washington

Highway system
- Pennsylvania State Route System; Interstate; US; State; Scenic; Legislative
← PA 843	→ PA 845

Pennsylvania Route 844 (PA 844) is a 14.9-mile-long (24.0 km) state highway located in Washington County, Pennsylvania. The western terminus is the West Virginia state line in Independence Township where the road becomes West Virginia Route 27 (WV 27). The eastern terminus is at PA 18 in Washington. PA 844 is a two-lane undivided road that passes through rural areas in western Washington County, serving West Middletown. Along the way, the route intersects PA 50 and PA 231 in Independence Township and PA 331 in Canton Township. The road between West Middletown and Washington became a private turnpike called the Washington and West Middletown Turnpike in 1852. The entire stretch of PA 844 was designated as the westernmost part of PA 31 in 1928. It was renumbered to PA 844 in September 1964 when the western terminus of PA 31 was cut back to West Newton.

== Route description ==
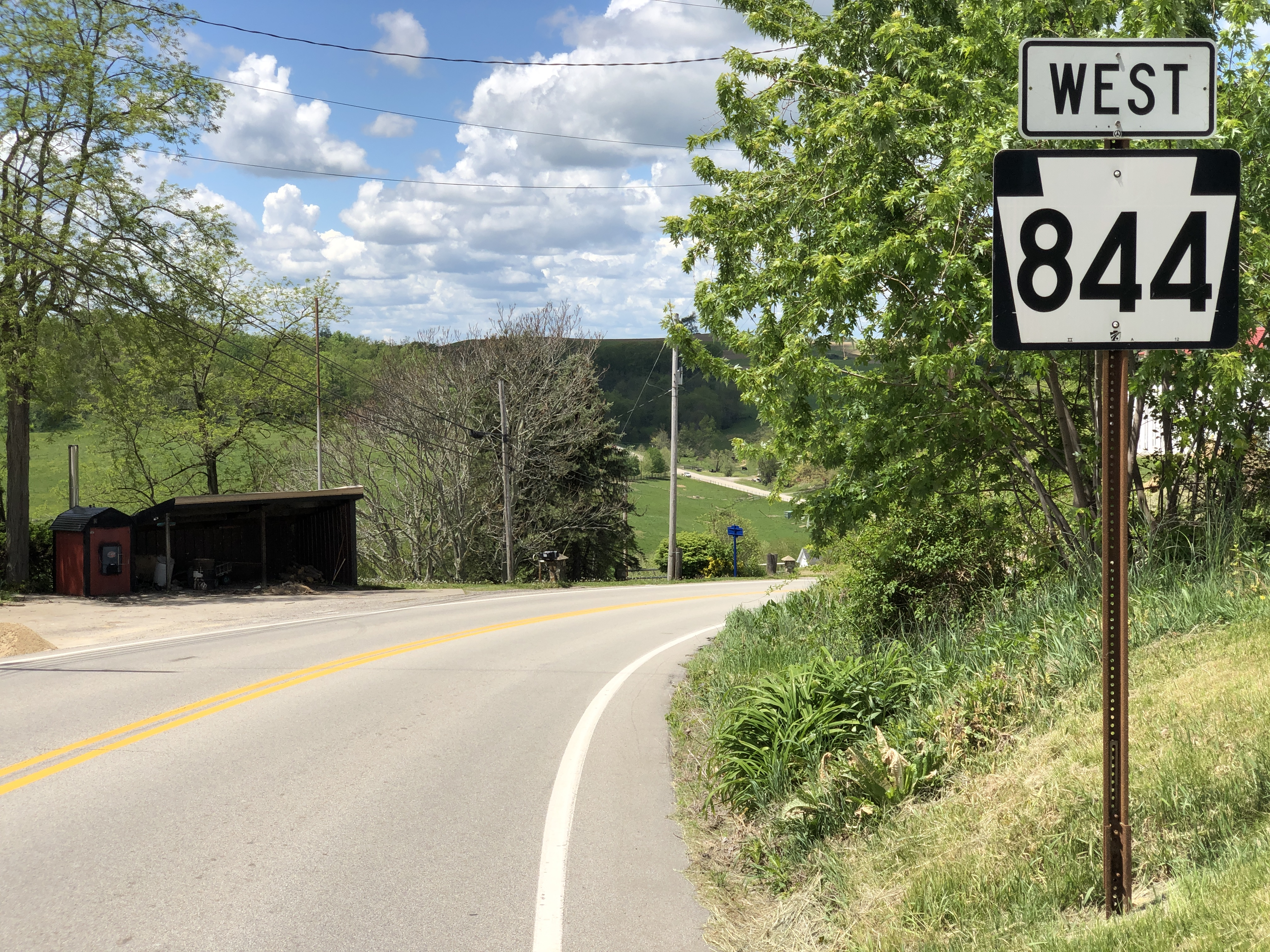
PA 844 westbound in Buffalo

PA 844 begins at the West Virginia border in Independence Township, where the road continues west into that state as WV 27. From the state line, the route heads east on two-lane undivided Washington Pike, passing through agricultural areas with some woods and homes. A short distance later, PA 844 comes to an intersection with the western terminus of PA 50 in the community of Independence. From this point, the road continues through more rural areas, forming a short concurrency with PA 231. The route continues east into more forested areas with some residences, heading into Hopewell Township and becoming Jefferson Avenue. PA 844 enters the borough of West Middletown, where it passes homes along Main Street. Upon crossing back into Hopewell Township, the route becomes Jefferson Avenue again and runs through a mix of farms and woods before heading southeast into open agricultural areas. The road passes through the community of Buffalo and continues through more farmland with patches of trees and residences. A short distance after entering Canton Township, PA 844 comes to a junction with the eastern terminus of PA 331 and passes more farms. Farther southeast, residential development near the road increases as it comes to the community of Wolfdale. The route passes homes and a few businesses before heading into industrial areas and crossing the Chartiers Creek. PA 844 enters the city of Washington and passes numerous homes and businesses before ending at PA 18.

== History ==
In 1819, commissioners were appointed to lay out a turnpike between Washington and Wellsburg, West Virginia (then a part of Virginia) along the present-day alignment of PA 844. What is now PA 844 between West Middletown and Washington was established as the Washington and West Middletown Turnpike on April 27, 1852. The turnpike ran between the National Road in Washington and New Middletown and contained one tollgate. On April 14, 1863, an act was passed to macadamize a portion of the Washington and West Middletown Turnpike.

When Pennsylvania legislated routes in 1911, the present-day alignment of PA 844 was designated as Legislative Route 242. In 1928, the road between the West Virginia border near Independence and PA 18 in Washington was designated as the westernmost portion of PA 31, which continued east from Washington to US 30 near Bedford. At this time, the entire length of PA 31 between the West Virginia border and Washington was paved except for the section between PA 28 (now PA 50) and PA 231. This unpaved section was paved by 1930. In September 1964, the western terminus of PA 31 was cut back to West Newton in order to avoid intersecting I-70 at multiple locations; the state only wanted state routes to intersect an Interstate highway once to avoid motorist confusion. PA 844 replaced the PA 31 designation between the West Virginia border and PA 18 in Washington.

== Major intersections ==
The entire route is in Washington County.

Location	mi	km	Destinations	Notes
Independence Township	0.000	0.000	WV 27 west (Washington Pike) – Wellsburg	West Virginia state line; western terminus of PA 844
Independence Township	0.671	1.080	PA 50 east (Avella Road)	Western terminus of PA 50
Independence Township	3.323	5.348	PA 231 north (Painters Hill Road)	Western terminus of PA 231 concurrency
Independence Township	3.453	5.557	PA 231 south (Scenic Drive) – Claysville	Eastern terminus of PA 231 concurrency
Canton Township	11.075	17.823	PA 331 west (Brush Run Road)	Eastern terminus of PA 331
Washington	14.970	24.092	PA 18 (Jefferson Avenue / Henderson Avenue) to I-70	Eastern terminus of PA 844
1.000 mi = 1.609 km; 1.000 km = 0.621 mi: Concurrency terminus
