= Pennsylvania Route 331 =

State highway in Washington County, Pennsylvania, US

Pennsylvania Route 331
- PA 331 highlighted in red, former routing in blue, truck route in pink

Route information
- Maintained by PennDOT
- Length: 14.508 mi (23.348 km)
- Existed: May 27, 1935–present

Major junctions
- West end: WV 67 at the West Virginia state line in Independence Township
- PA 231 in Independence Township
- East end: PA 844 in Canton Township

Location
- Country: United States
- State: Pennsylvania
- Counties: Washington

Highway system
- Pennsylvania State Route System; Interstate; US; State; Scenic; Legislative
← PA 329	→ PA 332

Pennsylvania Route 331 (PA 331) is a 14.5-mile-long (23.3 km), east–west state highway located in Washington County, Pennsylvania. The western terminus is at the West Virginia state line in Independence Township where the road continues as West Virginia Route 67 (WV 67). The eastern terminus is at PA 844 in Canton Township. PA 331 was initially established on May 27, 1935. The route was rerouted in the 2000s following the closure of a bridge over Buffalo Creek.

== Route description ==
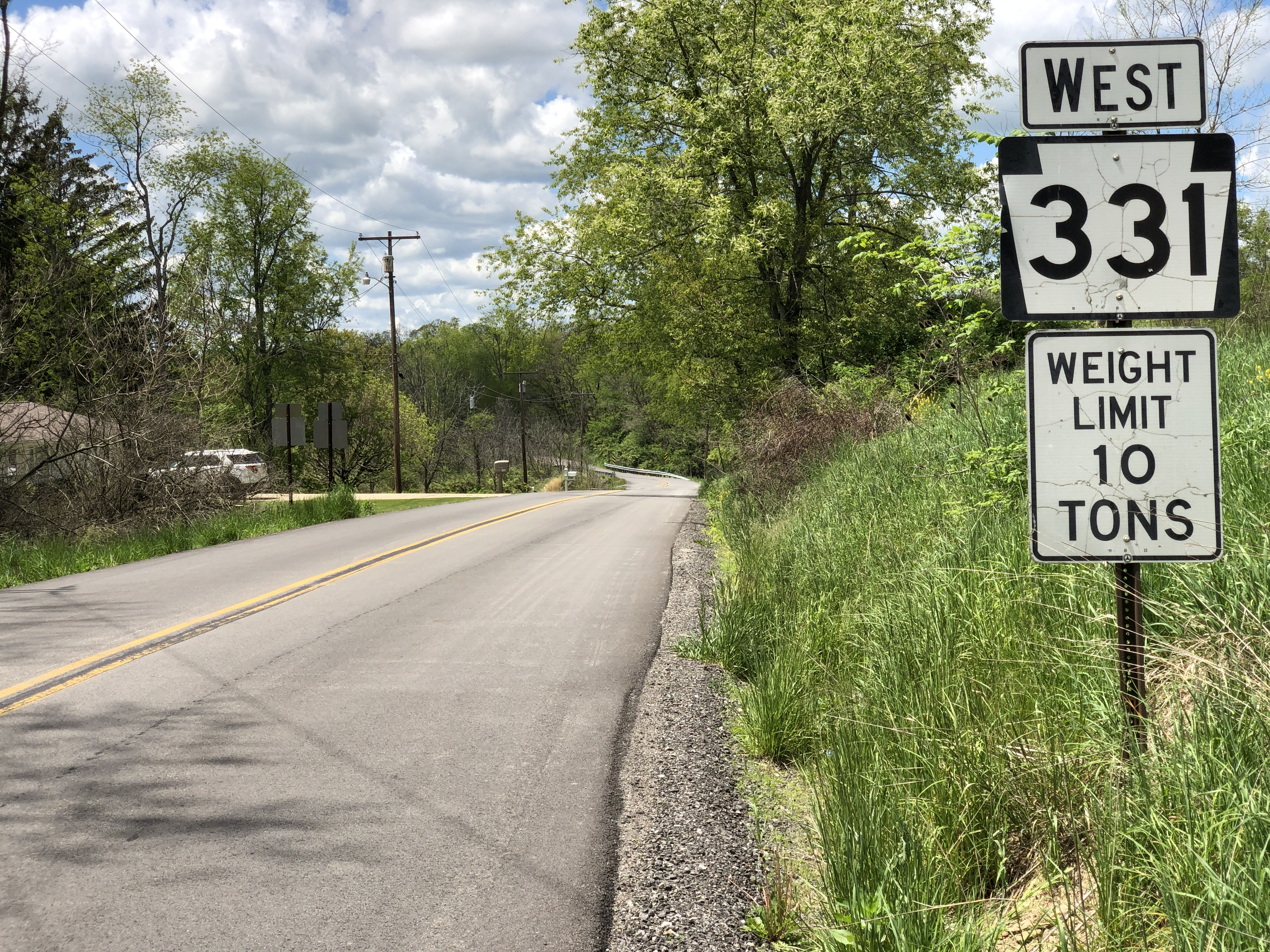
PA 331 westbound past PA 844 in Canton Township

PA 331 begins at the West Virginia state border, at the eastern terminus of WV 67. The route heads east in Independence Township paralleling Buffalo Creek. After 1.8 miles (2.9 km), the route makes a left turn onto Mount Hope Ridge Road. PA 231 meets PA 331 in the community of Mount Hope and together head south towards the community of Acheson. After turning east, PA 231 exits the concurrency and PA 331 alone heads east following the course of Brush Run. After passing through the southernmost portion of Hopewell Township, it reaches its eastern terminus at PA 844 in Canton Township.

== History ==
The route was established on May 27, 1935 on much of the same alignment it runs today. Prior to 2005, PA 331 followed a more direct route between the state line and Acheson by following Buffalo Creek in Independence and Donegal Townships. On August 30, 2005, the Pennsylvania Department of Transportation (PennDOT) closed and later removed one of the bridges over Buffalo Creek due to safety concerns. By 2007, PA 331 was routed onto then-SR 4065 (Mount Hope Ridge Road) and PA 231 and the decommissioned sections of PA 331 became SR 3001, SR 4034, and SR 4036.

== Major intersections ==
The entire route is in Washington County.

Location	mi	km	Destinations	Notes
Independence Township	0.000	0.000	WV 67 west (Brush Run Road)	West Virginia state line; western terminus of PA 331
Independence Township	5.141	8.274	PA 231 north (Scenic Drive)	Western terminus of PA 231 concurrency
Independence Township	7.332	11.800	PA 231 south	Eastern terminus of PA 231 concurrency
Canton Township	14.508	23.348	PA 844 (Jefferson Avenue)	Eastern terminus of PA 331
1.000 mi = 1.609 km; 1.000 km = 0.621 mi: Concurrency terminus

== PA 331 Truck ==
Pennsylvania Route 331 Truck
- Location: Washington County, Pennsylvania
- Length: 12.0 mi (19.3 km)

Pennsylvania Route 331 Truck is a truck route bypassing a weight-restricted bridge over a branch over Brush Run on which trucks over 36 tons and combination loads over 40 tons are prohibited. The route follows PA 231 and PA 844 through Washington County, Pennsylvania. PA 331 Truck was signed in 2013.
