= Pennsylvania Route 231 =

State highway in Washington County, Pennsylvania, US

Pennsylvania Route 231

Route information
- Maintained by PennDOT
- Length: 26.7 mi (43.0 km)

Major junctions
- South end: PA 18 in E. Finley Township
- US 40 in Claysville; PA 221 in Acheson; PA 331 in Acheson; PA 844 near West Middletown
- North end: PA 50 in Avella

Location
- Country: United States
- State: Pennsylvania
- Counties: Washington

Highway system
- Pennsylvania State Route System; Interstate; US; State; Scenic; Legislative
← PA 230	→ PA 232

Pennsylvania Route 231 (PA 231) is a 26.7-mile-long (43.0 km) state highway located in Washington County, Pennsylvania. The southern terminus is at PA 18 near Old Concord. The northern terminus is at PA 50 in Avella.

== Route description ==
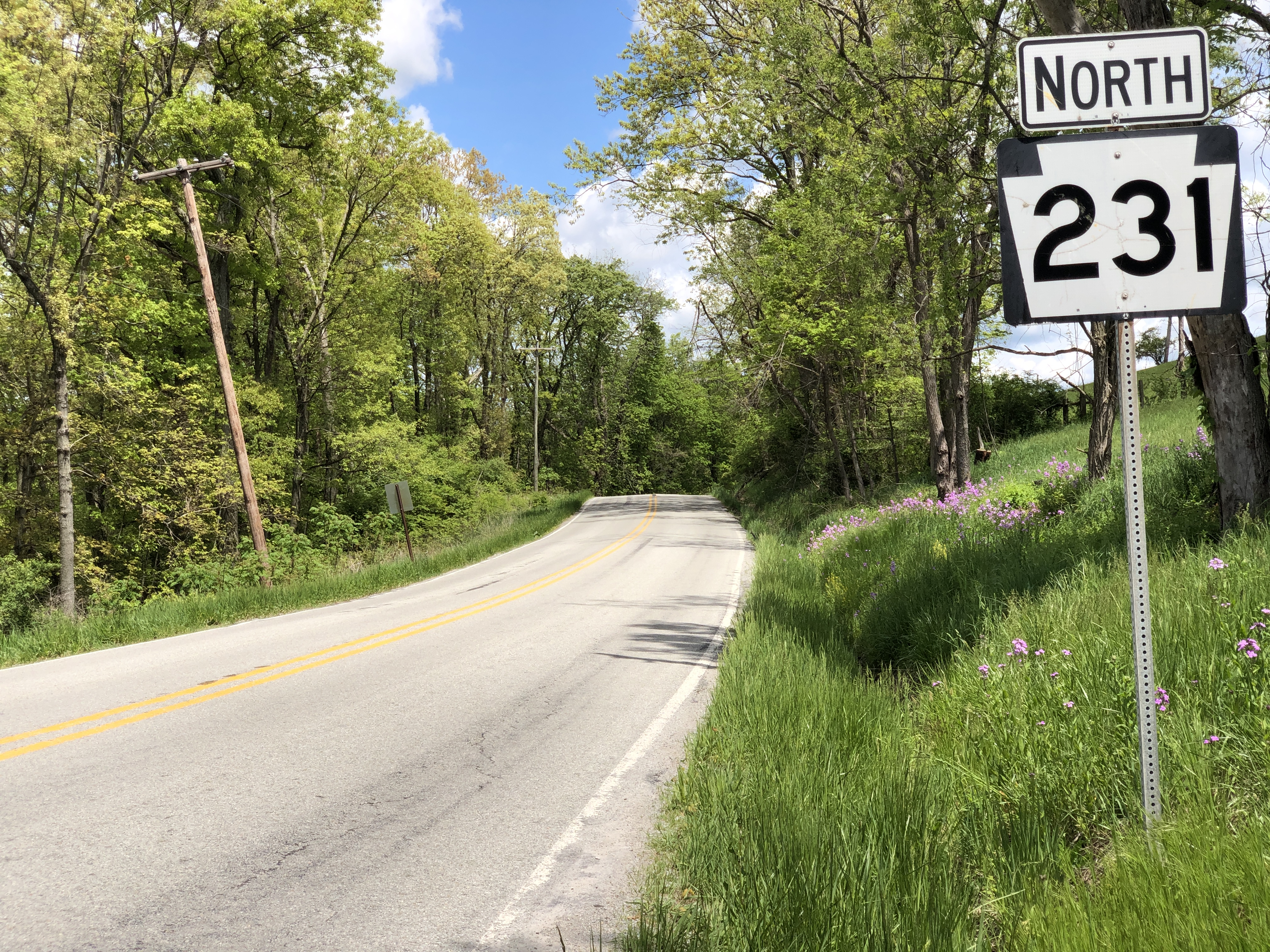
PA 231 northbound in Donegal Township

PA 231 begins at an intersection with PA 18 in East Finley Township, heading to the west on two-lane undivided East Finley Drive. The road heads through wooded areas with agriculture, running to the north of the Enlow Fork of the Wheeling Creek. The route curves southwest before making a sharp turn north away from the creek. PA 231 winds north through more areas of woods and farms with occasional homes, passing through the community of East Finley. The road continues through rural areas for several more miles, continuing into Donegal Township. After passing under I-70, PA 231 becomes Bell Avenue and forms the border between Donegal Township to the west and the borough of Claysville to the east, reaching an intersection with US 40. At this point, the route turns east to form a concurrency with US 40 on Main Street, fully entering Claysville and running past homes. PA 231 splits from US 40 by turning north onto Wayne Street, continuing through more residential areas.

The route crosses back into Donegal Township and heads northwest through woodland with some farms and residences as an unnamed road. The road curves north through more rural areas, crossing the Buffalo Creek into Blaine Township. In this area, PA 231 intersects PA 221 before entering Independence Township, becoming North Road and coming to PA 331. At this point, the two routes head west together, turning north onto Scenic Drive in Acheson. The road heads through forested areas before coming into a mix of farmland and woods. PA 331 splits from PA 231 by heading southwest on Mt. Hope Ridge Road. From here, PA 231 passes through more agricultural areas with some woodland and residences, coming to the PA 844 junction. The route turns west to form a brief concurrency with that route on Washington Pike before turning northwest onto Painters Hill Road. PA 231 passes through more rural areas as it comes to its northern terminus at PA 50.

== Major intersections ==
The entire route is in Washington County.

Location	mi	km	Destinations	Notes
East Finley Township	0.000	0.000	PA 18 (Prosperity Pike) – Sparta, Nineveh	Southern terminus of PA 231
Donegal Township–Claysville line	13.031	20.971	US 40 west (Main Street) to I-70	Southern terminus of US 40 concurrency
Claysville	13.329	21.451	US 40 east (Main Street)	Northern terminus of US 40 concurrency
Blaine Township	20.530	33.040	PA 221 south (Buffalo Creek Road)	Northern terminus of PA 221
Independence Township	20.629	33.199	PA 331 east (Brush Run Road)	Southern terminus of PA 331 concurrency
Independence Township	22.820	36.725	PA 331 west (Mt. Hope Ridge Road)	Northern terminus of PA 331 concurrency
Independence Township	25.044	40.304	PA 844 east (Washington Pike) – West Middletown	Southern terminus of PA 844 concurrency
Independence Township	25.173	40.512	PA 844 west (Washington Pike)	Northern terminus of PA 844 concurrency
Independence Township	26.766	43.076	PA 50 (Avella Road)	Northern terminus of PA 231
1.000 mi = 1.609 km; 1.000 km = 0.621 mi: Concurrency terminus
