= Maurice K. Goddard State Park =

State park in Pennsylvania, United States

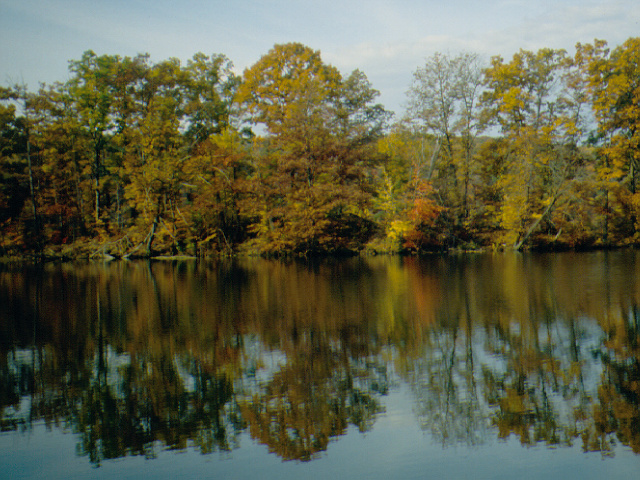

- Location within Pennsylvania Location within the United States
- Interactive map of Maurice K. Goddard State Park
- Location: Mercer County, Pennsylvania, United States
- Coordinates: 41°25′39″N 80°08′43″W
- Area: 2,856 acres (1,156 ha)
- Elevation: 1,270 feet (390 m)
- Established: 1972
- Administrator: Pennsylvania Department of Conservation and Natural Resources
- Visitors: 200,000+
- Website: Official website
- Pennsylvania State Parks

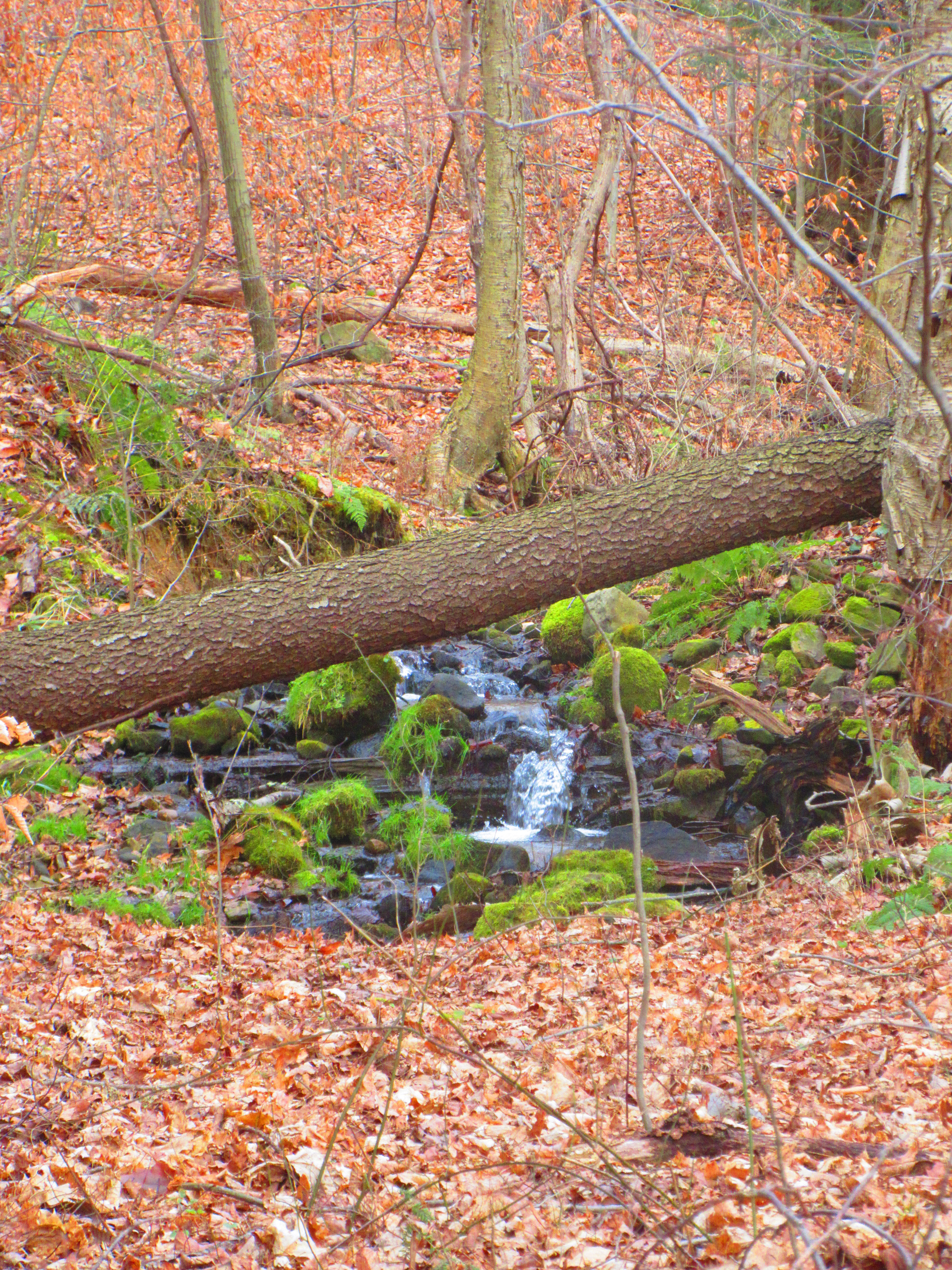
Scene along the Falling Run Nature Trail.

Maurice K. Goddard State Park is a 2,856-acre (1,156 ha) Pennsylvania state park in Deer Creek, Mill Creek, New Vernon and Sandy Lake Townships, Mercer County, Pennsylvania in the United States. It features wildlife, waterways and public recreational facilities. Lake Wilhelm shares its shorelines with Maurice K. Goddard State Park and State Game Land No. 270. The dam, built in 1971, creates a 1,860-acre (750 ha) reservoir providing a resource for people and wildlife. Many species of fish and amphibians make Lake Wilhelm their home. A variety of outdoor activities are available in and around the park vicinity. Special events and programs are held throughout the summer months. Maurice K. Goddard State Park is just off exit 130 of Interstate 79 on Pennsylvania Route 358.

The park is one of five Pennsylvania State Parks that were in the path of totality for the April 2024 total solar eclipse, with 59 seconds of totality.

== History ==
Sandy Creek, the stream that was dammed to create Lake Wilhelm, was noted in reports made by George Washington during his 1753 trip to Fort LeBoeuf during the French and Indian War. Sandy Creek had a recurring history of flooding. This led to a study by the U.S. Army Corps of Engineers which began in 1939. Plans were delayed by the start of World War II but the citizens of Mercer County could see the benefit of building a flood control dam on Sandy Creek. The state, county, township and municipal authorities of the surrounding area worked together to push forward the idea of building the dam and recreational facilities in Mercer County. The land was acquired in the late 1960s. Construction on the dam began soon after and was completed in 1971. Maurice K. Goddard State Park was opened to the public in 1972.

Maurice K. Goddard State park is named for Maurice K. Goddard. Goddard was a graduate of the University of Maine and the University of California at Berkeley. After reaching the rank of Lieutenant Colonel during World War II, Goddard came to Pennsylvania, where he took a job at Mont Alto Forestry School and later at Penn State Main Campus before he was appointed Secretary of the Pennsylvania Bureau of Forests and Waters, a forerunner of the Pennsylvania Department of Conservation and Natural Resources. Upon taking his position with the state, Goddard set about completing his goal of having a state park within 25 miles (40 km) of every resident of Pennsylvania. When Goddard retired in 1979, after 24 years working for the state parks, he had helped to add 45 state parks and over 130,000 acres (52,600 ha) of state park land to the Pennsylvania State Park system.

== Recreation ==
=== Bird watching ===
The variety of habitats at Maurice K. Goddard State Park attracts a variety of birds. Bald eagles and osprey can be seen flying over Lake Wilhelm as they scan the waters for fish. The old fields and forests are home to woodcocks, nighthawks, snipes, and a variety of warblers. Migrating waterfowl like the loon, common teal, goldeneye, merganser, and bufflehead stop by Lake Wilhelm in the spring and fall. Woodpeckers including the pileated woodpecker live in the woods of the park. Bluebirds and purple martins make their homes in the old fields and meadows of Maurice K. Goddard State Park.

=== Lake Wilhelm ===
Lake Wilhelm is a man-made reservoir and warm water fishery which lies partly within Maurice K. Goddard State Park and partly within the adjoining game lands. Common game fish found in the lake include largemouth and smallmouth bass, perch, crappie, bluegill, catfish, walleye, northern pike and muskellunge. All fishermen are expected to follow the rules and regulations of the Pennsylvania Fish and Boat Commission. Five natural gas wells have been drilled around Lake Wilhelm as of May 2009, with up to 15 more to follow. The state does not own the mineral rights under much of the park, but did work with the driller to minimize the impact of the wells on recreational uses of the park.

The portions of Lake Wilhelm that are within Maurice K. Goddard State Park are open to watercraft up to 20 horsepower (15 kW). There is a 241-space marina and a 48-space dry land mooring area that is open from May 1 to October 31. The marina has an ample parking lot for cars and trucks with trailers. There are four boat launches, a marina building, and a fueling station. Rowboats, pedal boats, canoes, and kayaks are available to rent. Only non-powered boats are permitted in the portions of the lake that are within the state game land boundaries. All vessels must have current registration from any state or a launch permit from the Pennsylvania Fish and Boat Commission.

=== Hunting ===
There are over 1,155 acres (467 ha) open to hunting at Maurice K. Goddard State Park. Hunters are expected to follow the rules and regulations of the Pennsylvania Game Commission. The common game species are waterfowl and white-tailed deer. The hunting of groundhogs is prohibited. Hunters may gain access to the nearby state game lands by entering through the park.

=== Winter activities ===
Maurice K. Goddard State Park is open during the winter months for ice fishing, ice boating, ice skating, sledding and tobogganing, cross-country skiing and snowmobiling.

== Friends of Goddard State Park ==
The Friends of Goddard State Park (FRoG) partner with the park to help conserve the natural environment of the areas within and around Goddard State Park by educating and introducing people to the world of nature and the facilities available to them. The Friends group also organizes two big events for the park: the Pioneer Frolic and Music at the Marina. The Pioneer Frolic takes place the last weekend in June and includes reenactors, food vendors, live music, and other entertainment. Music at the Marina showcases local bands and independent musicians with the addition of food vendors, a car cruise, and fireworks. Both events feature a donation-based book sale and have free admission.

Friends of Goddard State Park is a sub-chapter of the Pennsylvania Parks and Forest Foundation and a non-profit 501(c)(3) organization.
