= Lake Township, Pennsylvania =

Lake Township is the name of some places in the U.S. state of Pennsylvania:

- Lake Township, Luzerne County, Pennsylvania
- Lake Township, Mercer County, Pennsylvania
- Lake Township, Wayne County, Pennsylvania
