= West Virginia Route 88 =

State highway in Marshal, Ohio, and Brooke counties in West Virginia, United States

West Virginia Route 88

Route information
- Maintained by WVDOH
- Length: 32.2 mi (51.8 km)

Major junctions
- South end: US 250 in Limestone
- I-70 / US 40 in Wheeling
- North end: WV 27 near Wellsburg

Location
- Country: United States
- State: West Virginia
- Counties: Marshall, Ohio, Brooke

Highway system
- West Virginia State Highway System; Interstate; US; State
← WV 87	→ WV 90

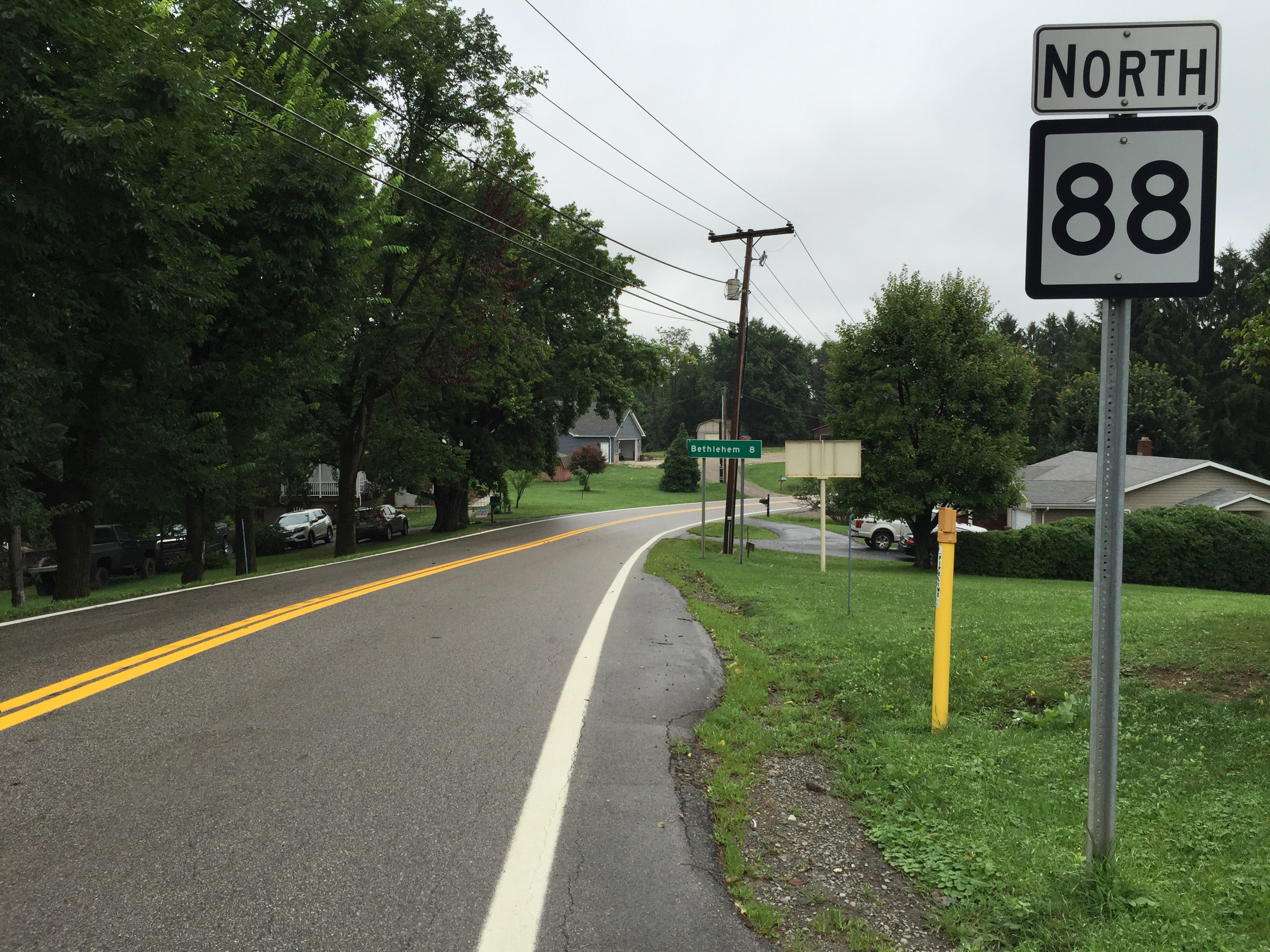
View north along WV 88 at US 250 in Limestone

West Virginia Route 88 is a north–south state highway located within the northern panhandle of West Virginia. The southern terminus is at U.S. Route 250 in Limestone. The northern terminus is at West Virginia Route 27 five miles (8 km) east of Wellsburg and 400 yards (370 m) west of the Pennsylvania border.

WV 88 is cosigned with U.S. Route 40 (National Road) from Elm Grove to Woodsdale. It originally terminated in Marshall County, West Virginia. Portions of WV 88 in Ohio County were originally designated as WV 91 via 29th Street and terminated in South Wheeling. A few Ohio County roads are still under the old Route 91 designation. WV 88 from National Road in Woodsdale to the intersection with WV 67 is most commonly known as Bethany Pike and some road signs refer to WV 88 south from Bethlehem as "Fairmont Pike".

== Attractions ==
- Golden Palace, Limestone
- Oglebay Park, Wheeling
- West Liberty University, West Liberty
- Bethany College, Bethany

== Major intersections ==
County	Location	mi	km	Destinations	Notes
Marshall		0.00	0.00	US 250 – Cameron, Moundsville	Southern terminus
Marshall		4.02	6.47	WV 86 south – Glen Dale	Northern terminus of WV 86
Ohio	Wheeling			I-70 / US 40 east (National Road) to I-470 west	Southern end of US 40 concurrency; exit 5 on I-70
Ohio	Wheeling			I-70 west – Columbus	Exit 4 on I-70
Ohio	Wheeling			US 40 west (National Road) to I-70	Northern end of US 40 concurrency
Brooke	Bethany			WV 67 west – Wellsburg	Southern end of WV 67 concurrency
Brooke	Bethany			WV 67 east – Bethany	Northern end of WV 67 concurrency
Brooke				WV 27	Northern terminus
1.000 mi = 1.609 km; 1.000 km = 0.621 mi: Concurrency terminus
