= West Virginia Route 27 =

State highway in West Virginia, United States

West Virginia Route 27

Route information
- Maintained by WVDOH
- Length: 5.8 mi (9.3 km)

Major junctions
- West end: WV 2 in Wellsburg
- WV 88 near Wellsburg
- East end: PA 844 near Wellsburg

Location
- Country: United States
- State: West Virginia
- Counties: Brooke

Highway system
- West Virginia State Highway System; Interstate; US; State
| ← WV 26 | → WV 28 |

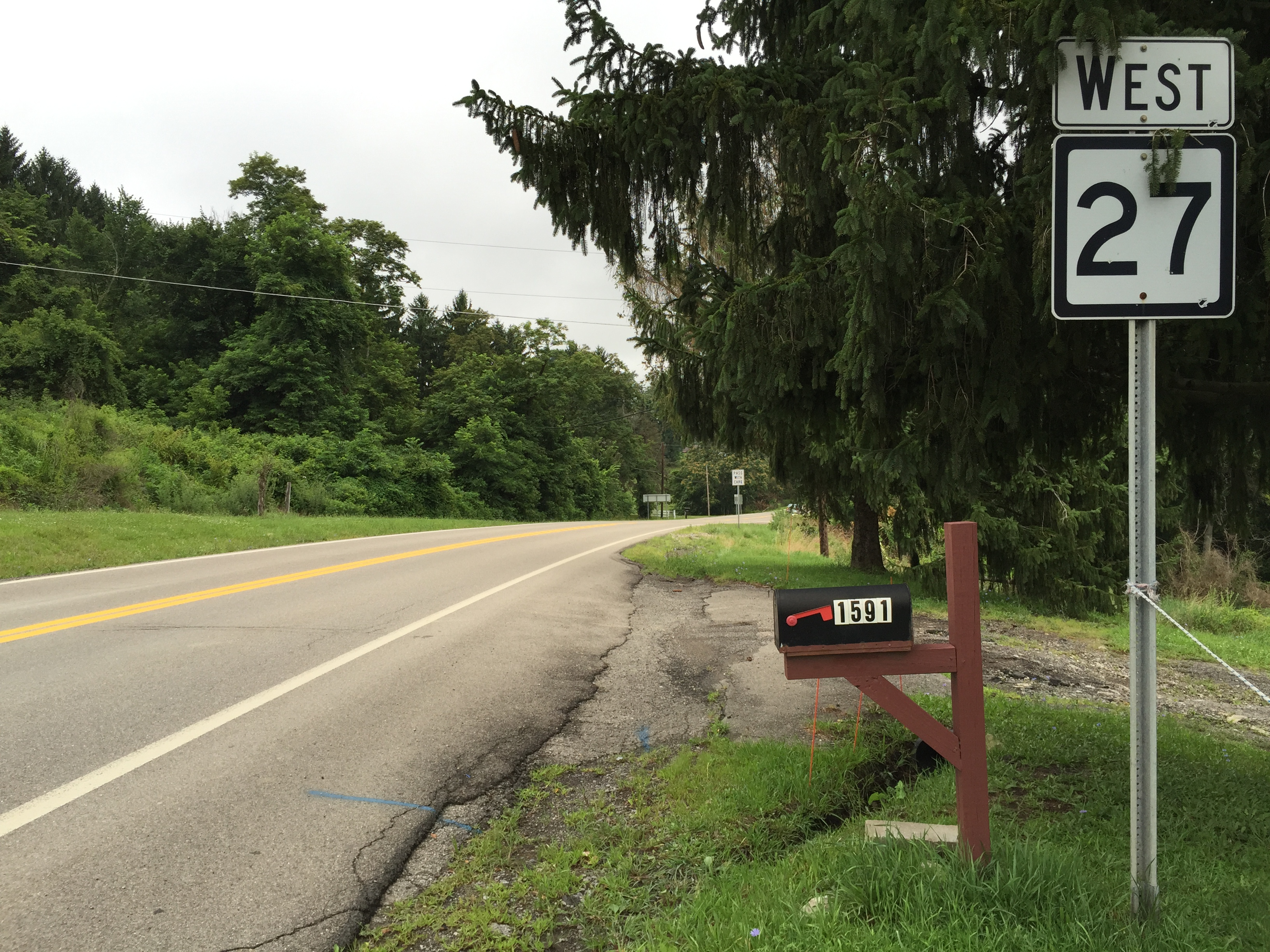
View west along WV 27 at WV 88 in Franklin

West Virginia Route 27 is an east–west state highway located within the northern panhandle county of Brooke in West Virginia. The western terminus of the route is at West Virginia Route 2 in Wellsburg. The eastern terminus is at the Pennsylvania state line 5 miles (8 km) east of Wellsburg, where WV 27 continues east into the border town of Independence as Pennsylvania Route 844.

== Major intersections ==
The entire route is in Brooke County.

| Location | mi | km | Destinations | Notes |
|---|---|---|---|---|
| Wellsburg | 0.0 | 0.0 | WV 2 | Western terminus of WV 27 |
| | | | WV 88 south – Bethany | Northern terminus of WV 88 |
| | 5.8 | 9.3 | PA 844 east – Washington | Eastern terminus of WV 27 at Pennsylvania state line |
1.000 mi = 1.609 km; 1.000 km = 0.621 mi

== WV 27 Alternate ==
West Virginia Route 27 Alternate
- Location: Follansbee
- Length: 6.0 mi (9.7 km)

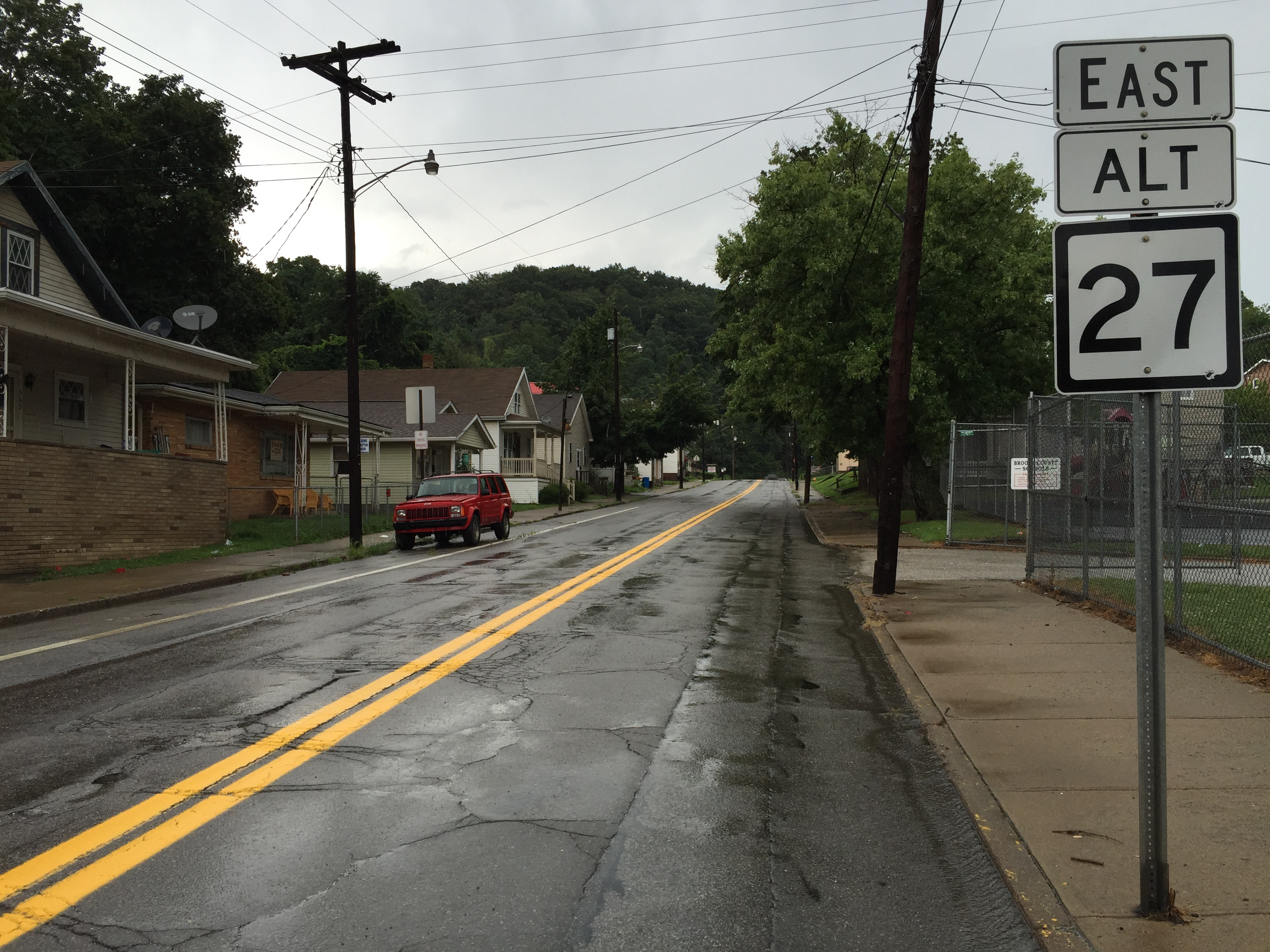
View east along WV 27 Alt. in Follansbee

West Virginia Route 27 Alternate is an east–west state highway located within the northern panhandle county of Brooke in West Virginia. The western terminus of the route is at West Virginia Route 2 in Follansbee. The eastern terminus is at the Pennsylvania state line near Eldersville, Pennsylvania, where the road continues as Eldersville Road (State Route 4014).

Unlike most alternate state routes, Alternate WV 27 does not connect with its parent WV 27 route. Approximately four miles of WV Route 2 separate the western termini of both routes.

=== Major intersections ===
The entire route is in Brooke County.

| Location | mi | km | Destinations | Notes |
|---|---|---|---|---|
| Follansbee | | | WV 2 | |
| | | | SR 4014 (Eldersville Road) | Pennsylvania state line |
1.000 mi = 1.609 km; 1.000 km = 0.621 mi
