= Evans, West Virginia =

Unincorporated community in West Virginia, United States

- Unincorporated community
- Location within West Virginia Location within the United States
- Coordinates: 38°49′13″N 81°46′46″W
- Country: United States
- State: West Virginia
- County: Jackson

Area
  - Total: 22.084 sq mi (57.197 km^{2})
  - Land: 21.954 sq mi (56.861 km^{2})
  - Water: 0.1300 sq mi (0.3367 km^{2})

Population (2010)
  - Total: 1,710
  - Density: 77.9/sq mi (30.1/km^{2})
- Time zone: UTC-5 (Eastern (EST))
  - Summer (DST): UTC-4 (EDT)
- ZIP codes: 25241

Evans is an unincorporated community in western Jackson County, West Virginia, United States. It lies along West Virginia Route 87 west of the city of Ripley, the county seat of Jackson County. Its elevation is 594 feet (181 m). Although Evans is unincorporated, it has a post office, with the ZIP code of 25241. Evans is home to 20 businesses that employ 70 individuals.

== Demographics ==
According to the 2010 U.S. Census, the population of Evans is 1,710, including 867 males and 843 females. The racial make-up of the town is 99.41% White, 0.11% African American, 0.23% Hispanic, 0.52% Asian, and 0.11% other races. There are 678 households located in Evans with 2.52 persons per household.

== Public Education ==
Evans Elementary School is the only public school in Evans. Their mascot is the Bears, and it serves grades PK-5 in the Jackson County School district. and 2022.

The school is currently ranked as the #1 elementary school in West Virginia by U.S. News.

== Notable people ==
- Jessica Wedge - 2006 Miss West Virginia USA
- David C. Hardesty Jr. - 21st President of West Virginia University
