= West Virginia Route 67 =

State highway in West Virginia, United States

West Virginia Route 67

Route information
- Maintained by WVDOH
- Length: 9.7 mi (15.6 km)

Major junctions
- West end: WV 2 in Wellsburg
- East end: PA 331 near Bethany

Location
- Country: United States
- State: West Virginia
- Counties: Brooke

Highway system
- West Virginia State Highway System; Interstate; US; State
← WV 66	→ I-68

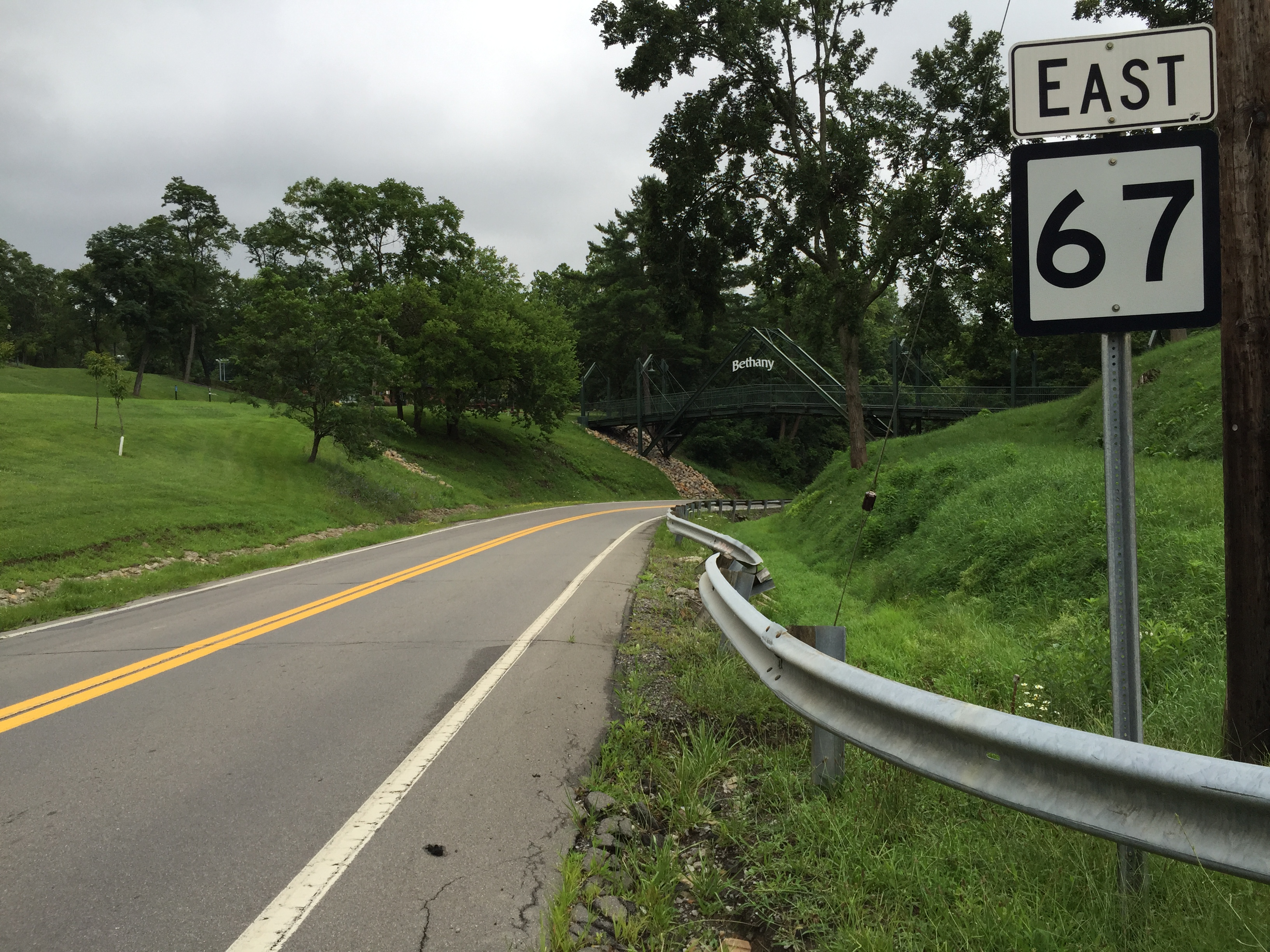
View east along WV 67 in Bethany

West Virginia Route 67 is an east–west state highway located within Brooke County. The western terminus of the route is at West Virginia Route 2 on the southern edge of Wellsburg. The eastern terminus is at the Pennsylvania state line east of Bethany, where WV 67 continues east as Pennsylvania Route 331.

== Major intersections ==
The entire route is in Brooke County.

Location	mi	km	Destinations	Notes
Wellsburg			WV 2 – Wheeling, Weirton	
Bethany			WV 88 south – West Liberty	west end of WV 88 overlap
Bethany			WV 88 north	east end of WV 88 overlap
			PA 331 east	Pennsylvania state line
1.000 mi = 1.609 km; 1.000 km = 0.621 mi: Concurrency terminus
