= Stoneboro, Pennsylvania =

Borough in Pennsylvania, US

- Borough
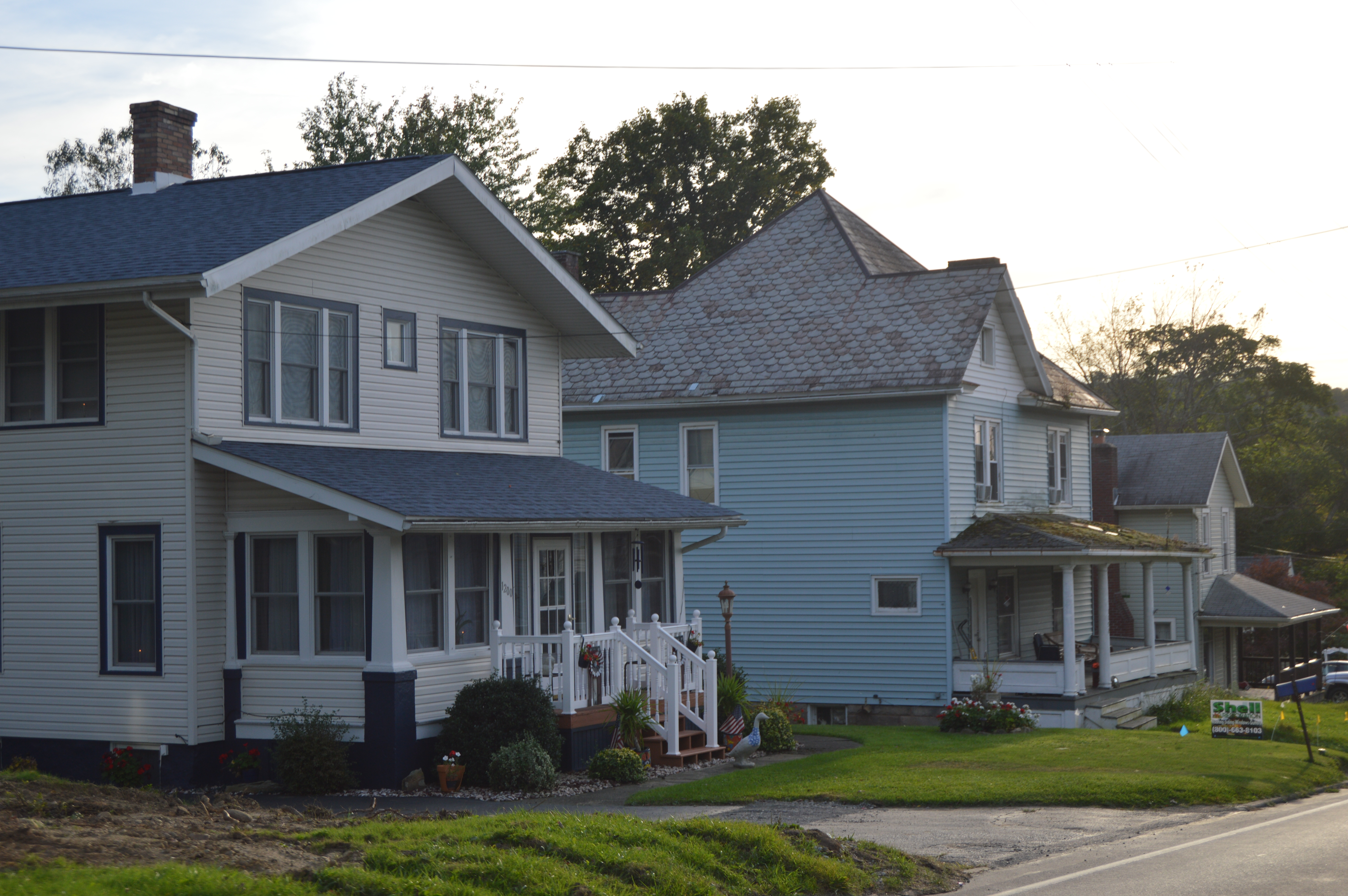
- Houses on Walnut Street

- Location of Stoneboro in Mercer County, Pennsylvania.
- Coordinates: 41°20′21″N 80°6′29″W
- Country: United States
- State: Pennsylvania
- County: Mercer
- Established: 1825

Area
  - Total: 2.94 sq mi (7.61 km^{2})
  - Land: 2.83 sq mi (7.34 km^{2})
  - Water: 0.10 sq mi (0.27 km^{2})
- Elevation (center of borough): 1,180 ft (360 m)
- Highest elevation (southwest corner of borough): 1,440 ft (440 m)
- Lowest elevation (Sandy Lake): 1,157 ft (353 m)

Population (2020)
  - Total: 946 ▼
  - Estimate (2021): 941
  - Density: 346/sq mi (133.5/km^{2})
- Time zone: UTC-4 (EST)
  - Summer (DST): UTC-5 (EDT)
- ZIP code: 16153
- Area code: 724
- FIPS code: 42-74288
- Website: http://www.stoneboropa.com

Stoneboro is a borough in eastern Mercer County, Pennsylvania, United States. The population was 946 at the 2020 census. It is part of the Hermitage micropolitan area.

== Geography ==
Stoneboro is located at 41°20′21″N 80°6′29″W (41.339029, -80.108100).

According to the United States Census Bureau, the borough has a total area of 2.9 square miles (7.5 km^{2}), of which 2.8 square miles (7.3 km^{2}) is land and 0.1 square miles (0.26 km^{2}) (3.79%) is water.

== Demographics ==
Historical population
Census	Pop.	Note	%±
1860	218		—
1870	471		116.1%
1880	1,186		151.8%
1890	1,394		17.5%
1900	1,061		−23.9%
1910	1,074		1.2%
1920	1,405		30.8%
1930	1,189		−15.4%
1940	1,194		0.4%
1950	1,294		8.4%
1960	1,267		−2.1%
1970	1,129		−10.9%
1980	1,177		4.3%
1990	1,091		−7.3%
2000	1,104		1.2%
2010	1,051		−4.8%
2020	945		−10.1%
2021 (est.)	941	▼	−0.4%

At the 2000 census there were 1,104 people, 475 households, and 314 families residing in the borough. The population density was 395.4 inhabitants per square mile (152.7/km^{2}). There were 517 housing units at an average density of 185.1 per square mile (71.5/km^{2}). The racial makeup of the borough was 98.73% White, 0.09% African American, 0.09% Native American, 0.18% Asian, and 0.91% from two or more races. Hispanic or Latino of any race were 0.45%.

There were 475 households, 31.6% had children under the age of 18 living with them, 55.6% were married couples living together, 8.0% had a female householder with no husband present, and 33.7% were non-families. 30.5% of households were made up of individuals, and 21.1% were one person aged 65 or older. The average household size was 2.32 and the average family size was 2.91.

In the borough the population was spread out, with 24.3% under the age of 18, 7.9% from 18 to 24, 26.1% from 25 to 44, 22.9% from 45 to 64, and 18.8% 65 or older. The median age was 39 years. For every 100 females there were 94.0 males. For every 100 females age 18 and over, there were 87.4 males.

The median household income was $30,592 and the median family income was $35,714. Males had a median income of $32,014 versus $19,861 for females. The per capita income for the borough was $14,999. About 7.4% of families and 9.8% of the population were below the poverty line, including 12.5% of those under age 18 and 7.9% of those age 65 or over.

== Wesleyan Methodist Camp ==
The borough is home to Wesleyan Methodist Camp, a campground owned by the Allegheny Wesleyan Methodist Connection that was built in 1900.
