= West Virginia Route 87 =

State highway in West Virginia, United States

West Virginia Route 87

Route information
- Maintained by WVDOH
- Length: 13.0 mi (20.9 km)

Major junctions
- West end: WV 2 near Mount Alto
- East end: WV 62 near Evans

Location
- Country: United States
- State: West Virginia
- Counties: Mason, Jackson

Highway system
- West Virginia State Highway System; Interstate; US; State
← WV 86	→ WV 88

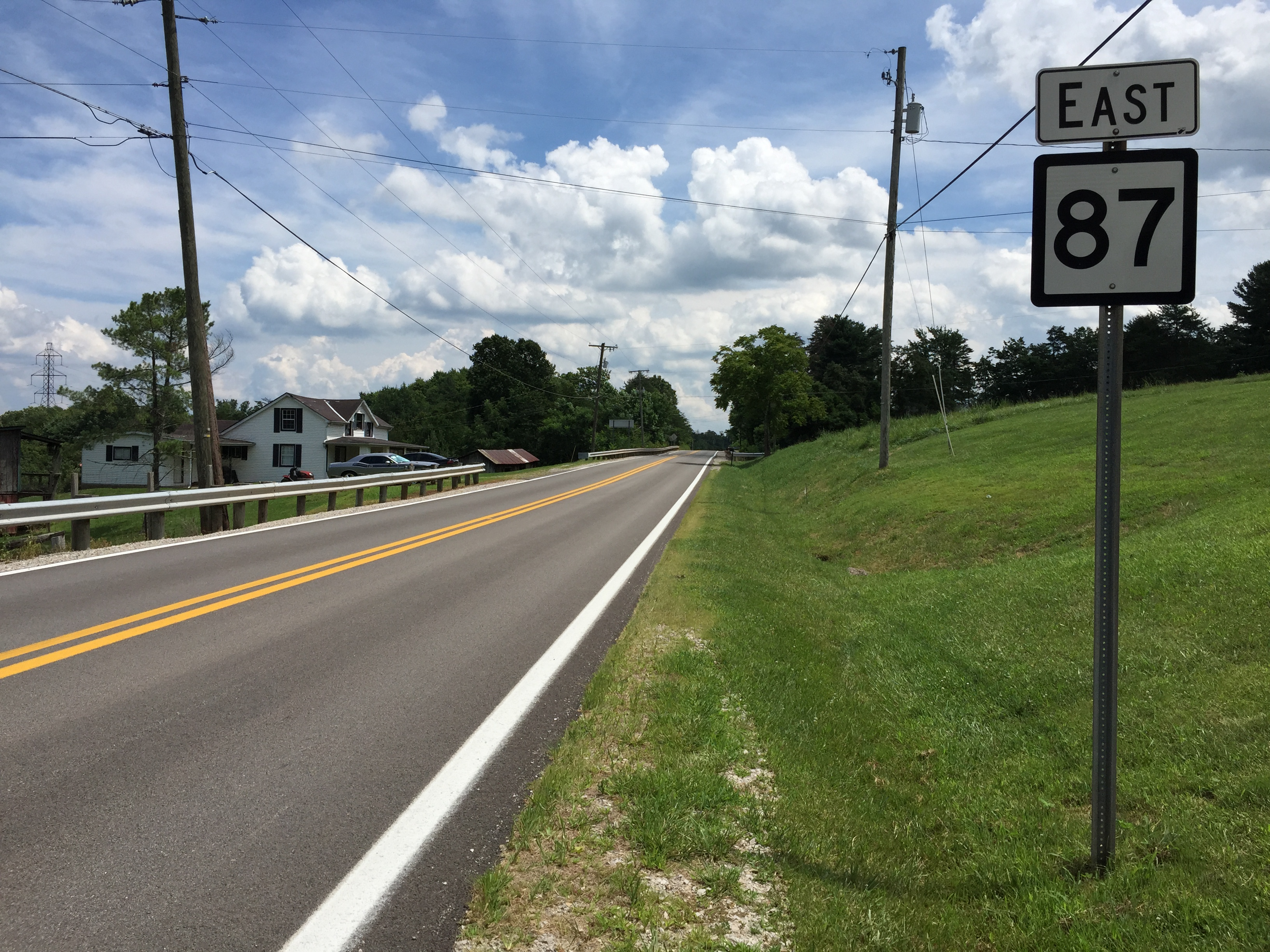
View east along WV 87 at WV 2 in eastern Mason County

West Virginia Route 87 is an east–west state highway located in western West Virginia. The western terminus of the route is at West Virginia Route 2 southwest of Mount Alto. The eastern terminus of the route is at West Virginia Route 62 northeast of Evans and 3 miles (5 km) west of Ripley.

== Major intersections ==
County	Location	mi	km	Destinations	Notes
Mason				WV 2 – Point Pleasant, Ravenswood	
Jackson				WV 62 – New Haven, Ripley	
1.000 mi = 1.609 km; 1.000 km = 0.621 mi
