= West Virginia Route 86 =

State highway in Marshall County, West Virginia, United States

West Virginia Route 86

Route information
- Maintained by WVDOH
- Length: 5.9 mi (9.5 km)

Major junctions
- South end: US 250 / WV 2 in Glen Dale
- North end: WV 88 near Benwood

Location
- Country: United States
- State: West Virginia
- Counties: Marshall

Highway system
- West Virginia State Highway System; Interstate; US; State
← WV 85	→ WV 87

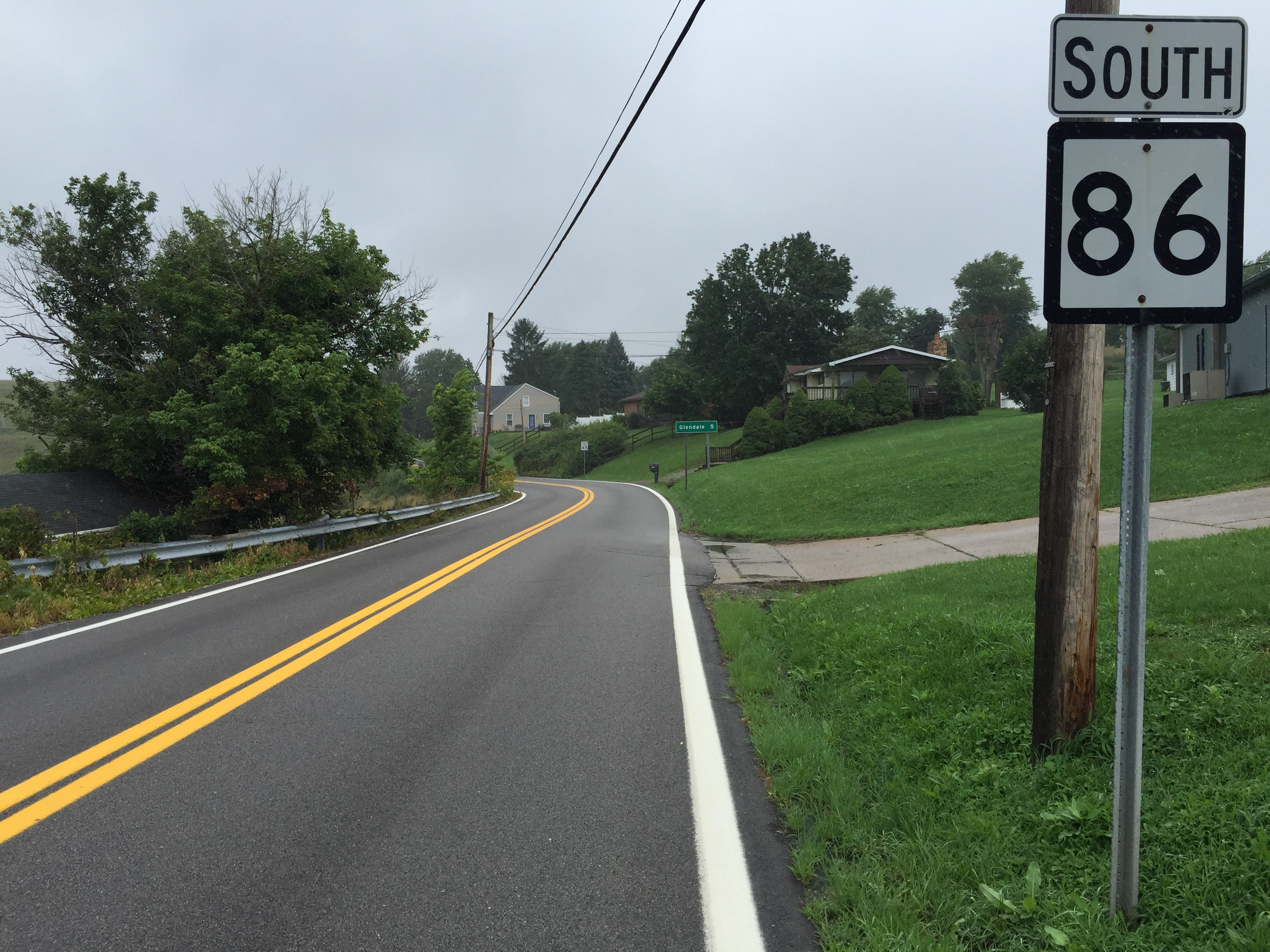
View south along WV 86 at WV 88 in Sherrard

West Virginia Route 86 is a north–south state highway located within Marshall County, West Virginia. The southern terminus of the route is at U.S. Route 250 and West Virginia Route 2 in Glen Dale. The northern terminus is at West Virginia Route 88 southeast of Benwood.

== Major intersections ==
The entire route is in Marshall County.

Location	mi	km	Destinations	Notes
Glen Dale			US 250 / WV 2	
			WV 88 to US 250 – Bethlehem	
1.000 mi = 1.609 km; 1.000 km = 0.621 mi
