= New Vernon Township, Pennsylvania =

Township in Pennsylvania, US

Coordinates: 41°25′00″N 80°06′59″W

- Township
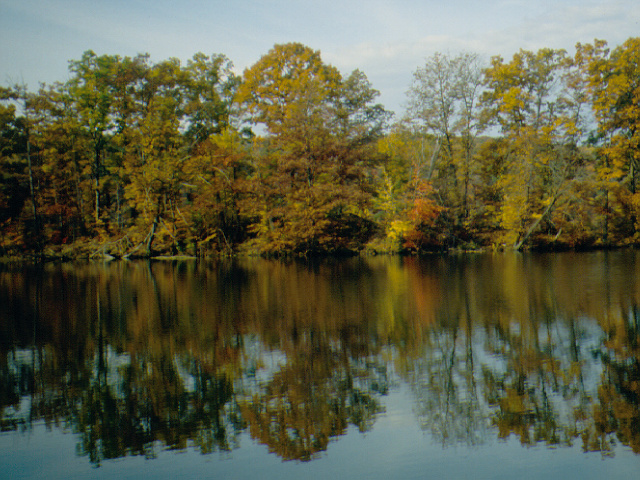
- Lake Wilhelm at Maurice K. Goddard State Park

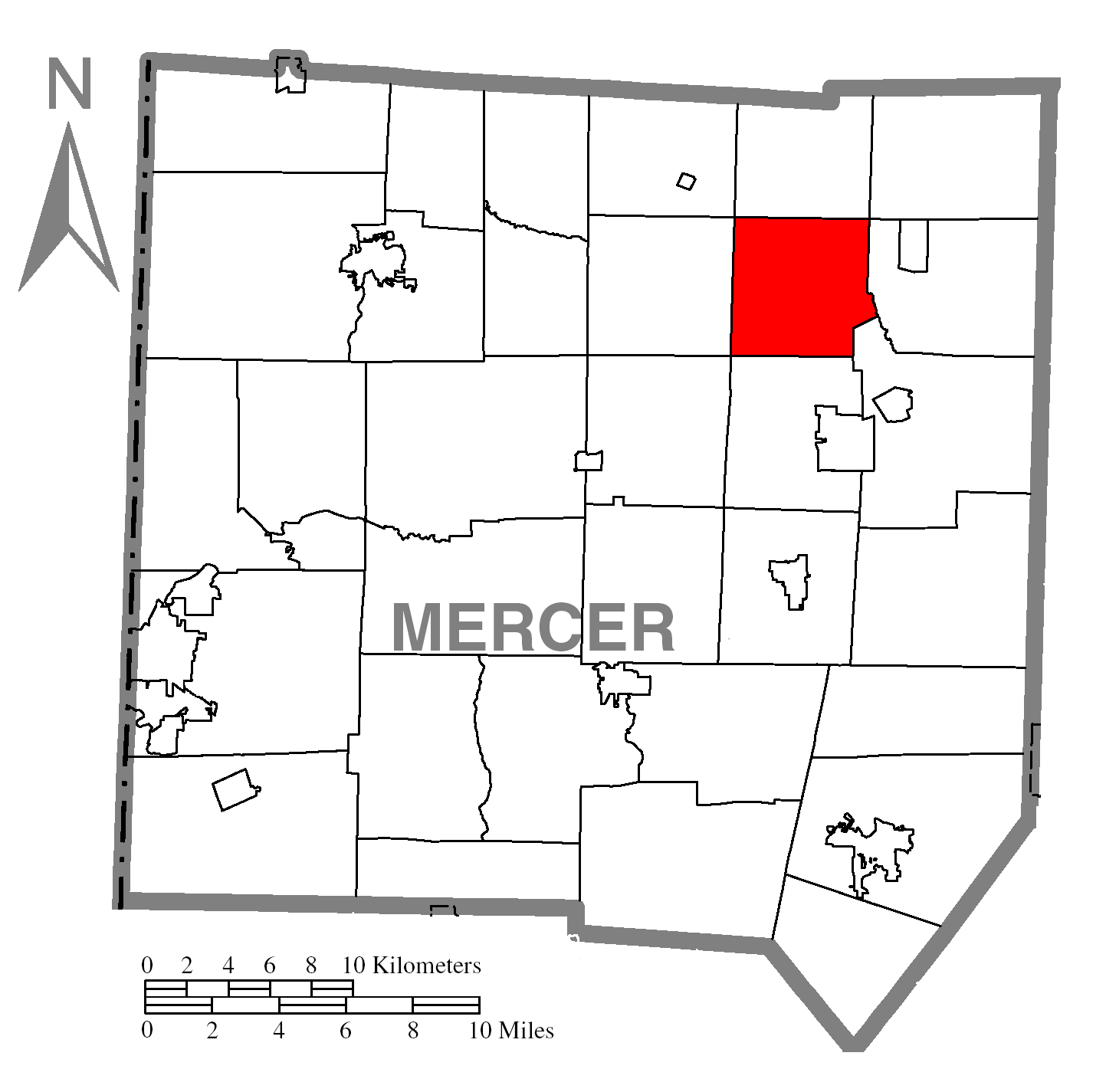
- Location of New Vernon Township in Mercer County

- Location of Mercer County in Pennsylvania
- Country: United States
- State: Pennsylvania
- County: Mercer

Area
  - Total: 16.34 sq mi (42.31 km^{2})
  - Land: 14.93 sq mi (38.67 km^{2})
  - Water: 1.41 sq mi (3.64 km^{2})

Population (2020)
  - Total: 492
  - Estimate (2022): 489
  - Density: 33.5/sq mi (12.93/km^{2})
- Time zone: UTC-4 (EST)
  - Summer (DST): UTC-5 (EDT)
- Area code: 724
- FIPS code: 42-085-54304

Historical population
Census	Pop.	Note	%±
2000	524		—
2010	504		−3.8%
2020	492		−2.4%
2022 (est.)	489		−0.6%
U.S. Decennial Census

New Vernon Township is a township in Mercer County, Pennsylvania, United States. The population was 492 at the 2020 census, down from 504 in 2010.

== Geography ==
According to the United States Census Bureau, the township has a total area of 16.5 square miles (42.7 km^{2}), of which 15.1 square miles (39.0 km^{2}) is land and 1.4 square miles (3.7 km^{2}) (8.61%) is water.

== Demographics ==
As of the census of 2000, there were 524 people, 193 households and 154 families residing in the township. The population density was 34.8 inhabitants per square mile (13.4/km^{2}). There were 218 housing units at an average density of 14.5/sq mi (5.6/km^{2}). The racial makeup of the township was 99.81% White and 0.19% Asian.

There were 193 households, out of which 34.2% had children under the age of 18 living with them, 66.8% were married couples living together, 6.7% had a female householder with no husband present, and 19.7% were non-families. 16.1% of all households were made up of individuals, and 5.2% had someone living alone who was 65 years of age or older. The average household size was 2.72 and the average family size was 2.97.

In the township the population was spread out, with 26.1% under the age of 18, 5.5% from 18 to 24, 27.7% from 25 to 44, 25.6% from 45 to 64, and 15.1% who were 65 years of age or older. The median age was 38 years. For every 100 females there were 103.9 males. For every 100 females age 18 and over, there were 99.5 males.

The median income for a household in the township was $32,031, and the median income for a family was $34,125. Males had a median income of $29,732 versus $17,500 for females. The per capita income for the township was $13,325. About 5.4% of families and 9.8% of the population were below the poverty line, including 14.8% of those under age 18 and none of those age 65 or over.
