= Limestone, West Virginia =

Limestone
- Unincorporated community
- Interactive map of Limestone
- Coordinates: 39°56′04″N 80°38′42″W
- Country: United States
- State: West Virginia
- Time zone: UTC-5 (Eastern (EST))
  - Summer (DST): UTC-4 (EDT)

Limestone is an unincorporated community in Marshall County, West Virginia, United States.

The community was named for deposits of limestone near the original town site.
