= Independence Township, Washington County, Pennsylvania =

Township in Pennsylvania, US

Coordinates: 40°14′2″N 80°28′58″W

Independence Township
- Township
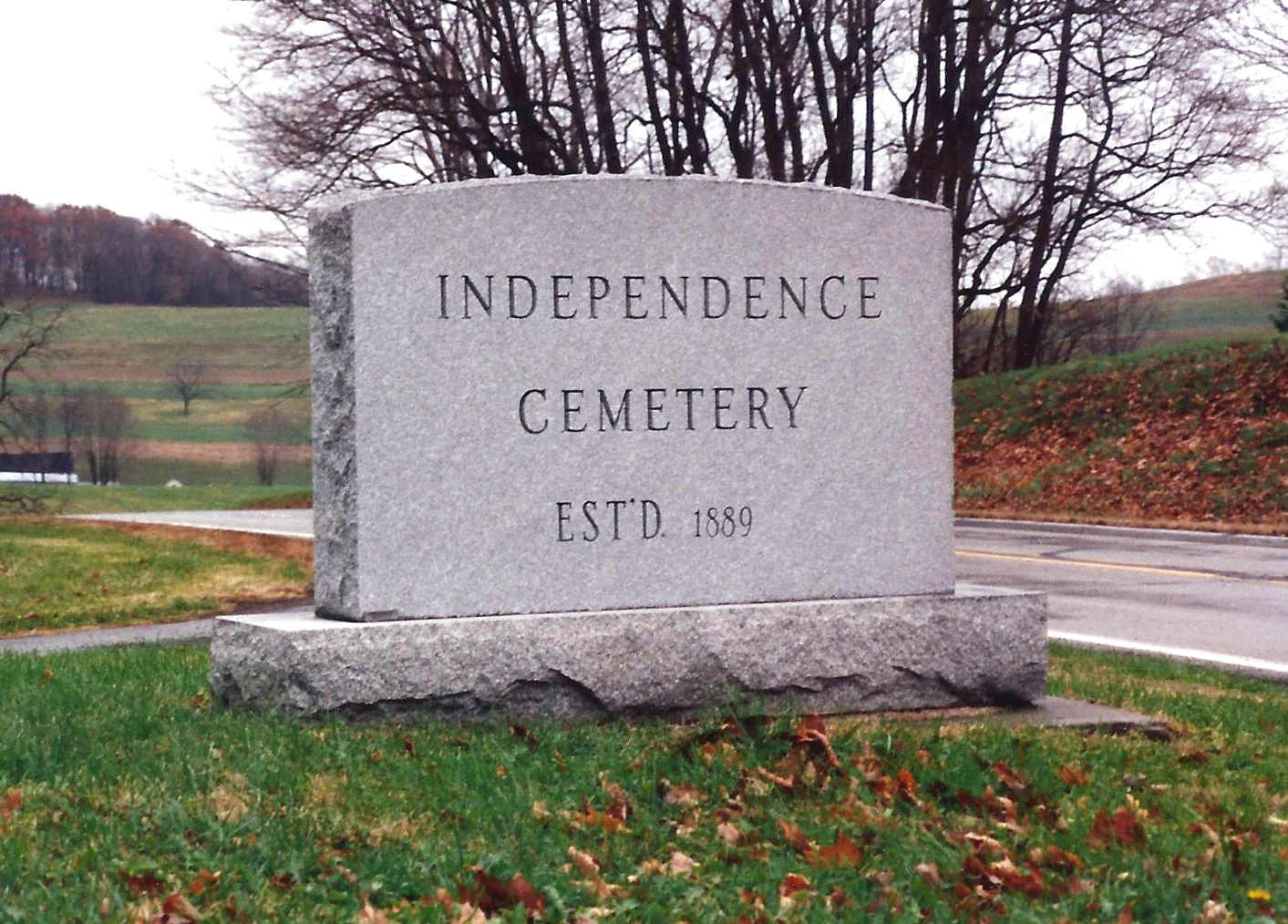
- Entrance to Independence Cemetery

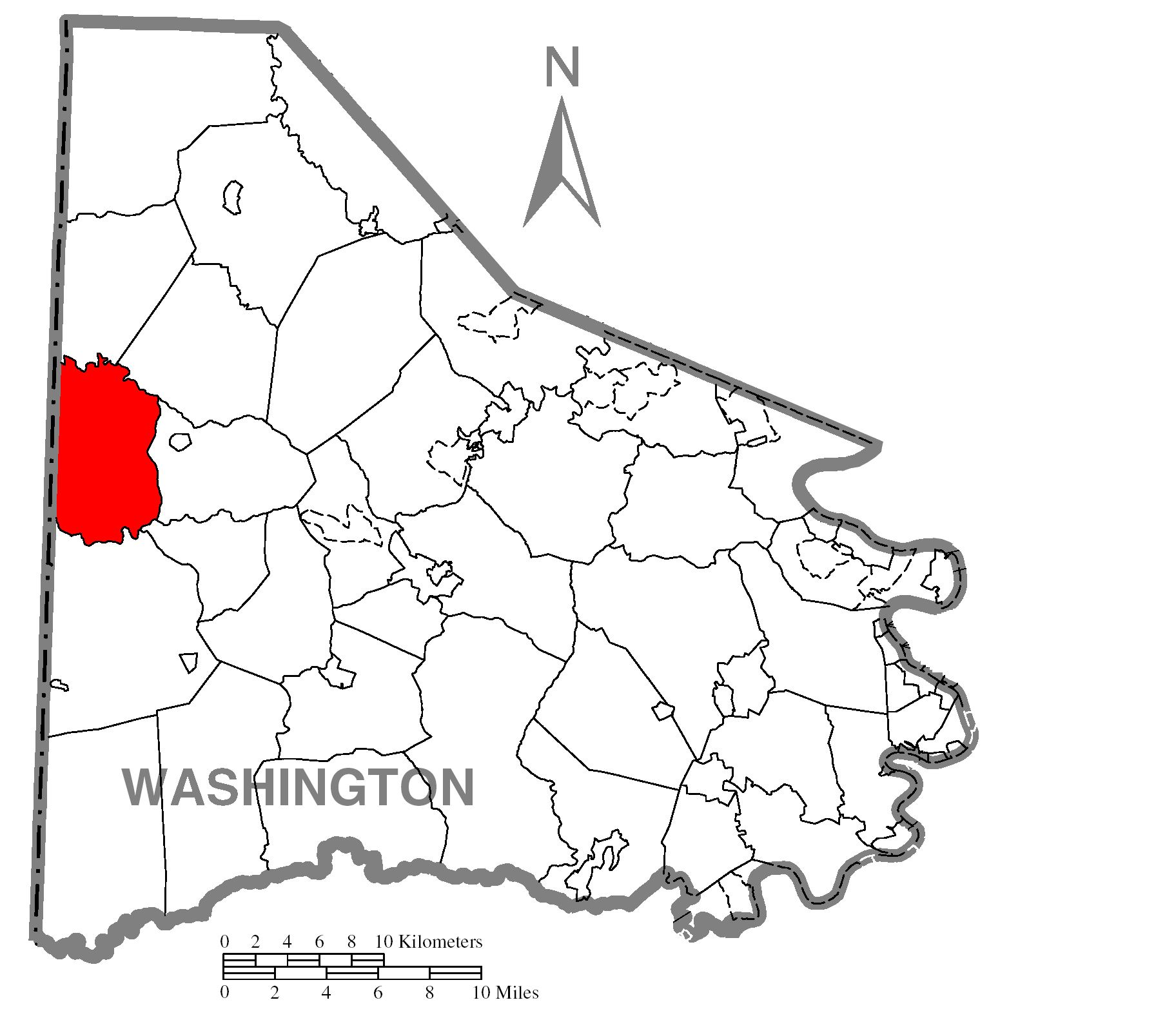
- Location of Independence Township in Washington County

- Location of Washington County in Pennsylvania
- Country: United States
- State: Pennsylvania
- County: Washington County

Area
  - Total: 25.76 sq mi (66.73 km^{2})
  - Land: 25.75 sq mi (66.70 km^{2})
  - Water: 0.015 sq mi (0.04 km^{2})

Population (2010)
  - Total: 1,557
  - Estimate (2018): 1,510
  - Density: 59.1/sq mi (22.82/km^{2})
- Time zone: UTC-4 (EST)
  - Summer (DST): UTC-5 (EDT)
- Area code: 724
- FIPS code: 42-125-36800
- Website: https://independence.patownship.org/

Historical population
Census	Pop.	Note	%±
2000	1,676		—
2010	1,557		−7.1%
2020	1,511		−3.0%
2025 (est.)	1,483		−1.9%
U.S. Decennial Census

Independence Township is a township in Washington County, Pennsylvania, United States. The population was 1,557 at the 2010 census.

== History ==
Independence Township was originally a part of Hopewell Township for the first almost seventy-five years from the formation of Hopewell in 1781. A petition was presented to the Court of Quarter Sessions in November 1854, requesting a division of the Hopewell Township. "The court appointed as viewers Lysander Patterson, John Cole, Esq., and William Gillespie. The matter was continued from term to term until February sessions of 1856, when the court ordered the division and the erection of a new township, to be called Independence, elections to be held at the house of William White. in the village of Independence."

The Isaac Manchester House was listed on the National Register of Historic Places in 1975.

== Geography ==
According to the United States Census Bureau, the township has a total area of 25.8 square miles (67 km^{2}), of which, 25.8 square miles (67 km^{2}) of it is land and 0.04% is water. Independence is one of the townships lying on the western border of Washington County. Its northern boundary is the stream Cross Creek, which separates it from the townships of Cross Creek and Jefferson. On the east it is bounded by Hopewell Township; on the south by Donegal, from which it is separated by Buffalo Creek. Its western boundary is the State of West Virginia. The two creeks above mentioned (Cross and Buffalo), forming respectively the north and south boundaries of Independence, are the only streams of any size or importance belonging to the township. The township contains part of the census-designated place Avella.

== Surrounding neighborhoods ==
Independence Township has six borders, including Jefferson Township to the north, Cross Creek Township to the northeast, Hopewell Township to the east, Blaine Township to the southeast, Donegal Township to the south, and Brooke County, West Virginia to the west.

== Demographics ==
As of the census of 2000, there were 1,676 people, 646 households, and 494 families residing in the township. The population density was 65.1 people per square mile (25.1 people/km^{2}). There were 697 housing units at an average density of 27.1 per square mile (10.5/km^{2}). The racial makeup of the township was 98.57% White, 0.30% African American, 0.30% Native American, and 0.84% from two or more races. Hispanic or Latino of any race were 0.18% of the population.

There were 646 households, out of which 28.9% had children under the age of 18 living with them, 61.8% were married couples living together, 9.0% had a female householder with no husband present, and 23.5% were non-families. 20.1% of all households were made up of individuals, and 10.7% had someone living alone who was 65 years of age or older. The average household size was 2.59 and the average family size was 3.00.

In the township the population was spread out, with 22.4% under the age of 18, 7.2% from 18 to 24, 27.8% from 25 to 44, 26.6% from 45 to 64, and 16.0% who were 65 years of age or older. The median age was 40 years. For every 100 females, there were 107.9 males. For every 100 females age 18 and over, there were 105.0 males.

The median income for a household in the township was $34,539, and the median income for a family was $40,865. Males had a median income of $31,932 versus $23,207 for females. The per capita income for the township was $16,355. About 7.1% of families and 9.4% of the population were below the poverty line, including 12.6% of those under age 18 and 14.0% of those age 65 or over.
