= Wilson's Mill Covered Bridge =

- U.S. National Register of Historic Places
- Washington County History & Landmarks Foundation Landmark
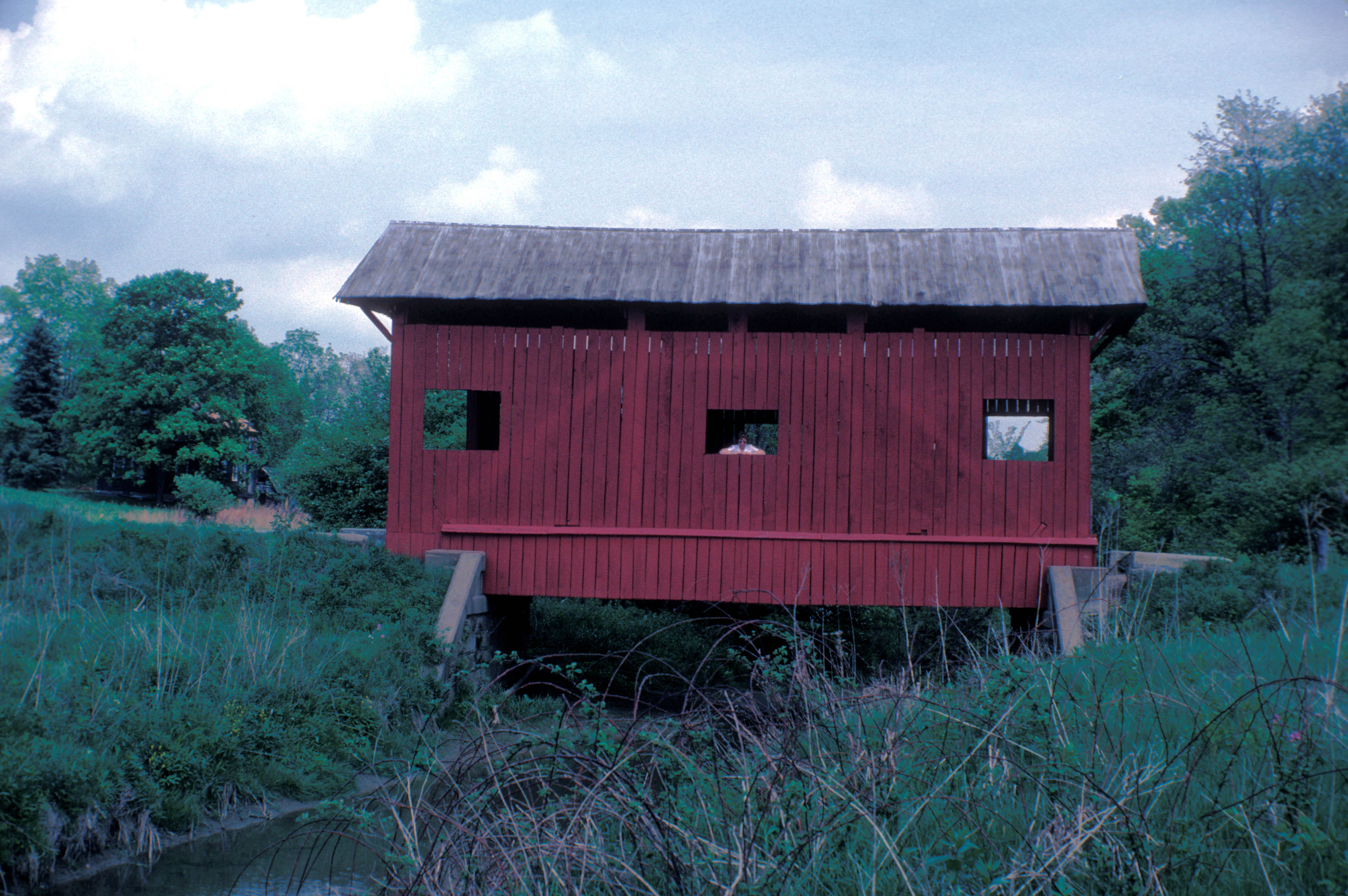
- The bridge in 1970

- Location within Pennsylvania Location within the United States
- Nearest city: Avella, Pennsylvania
- Coordinates: 40.2591°N 80.3777°W
- Area: 0.1 acres (0.040 ha)
- Architectural style: Kingpost truss
- MPS: Covered Bridges of Washington and Greene Counties TR
- NRHP reference No.: 79003826
- Added to NRHP: June 22, 1979

The Wilson's Mill Covered Bridge is a historic covered bridge in Avella, Pennsylvania.

It is designated as a historic bridge by the Washington County History & Landmarks Foundation.

Since being destroyed in an arson, it was moved to McDonald, Pennsylvania, as a replica.
