= Lake Township, Mercer County, Pennsylvania =

Township in Pennsylvania, US

Coordinates: 41°21′30″N 80°06′59″W

- Township
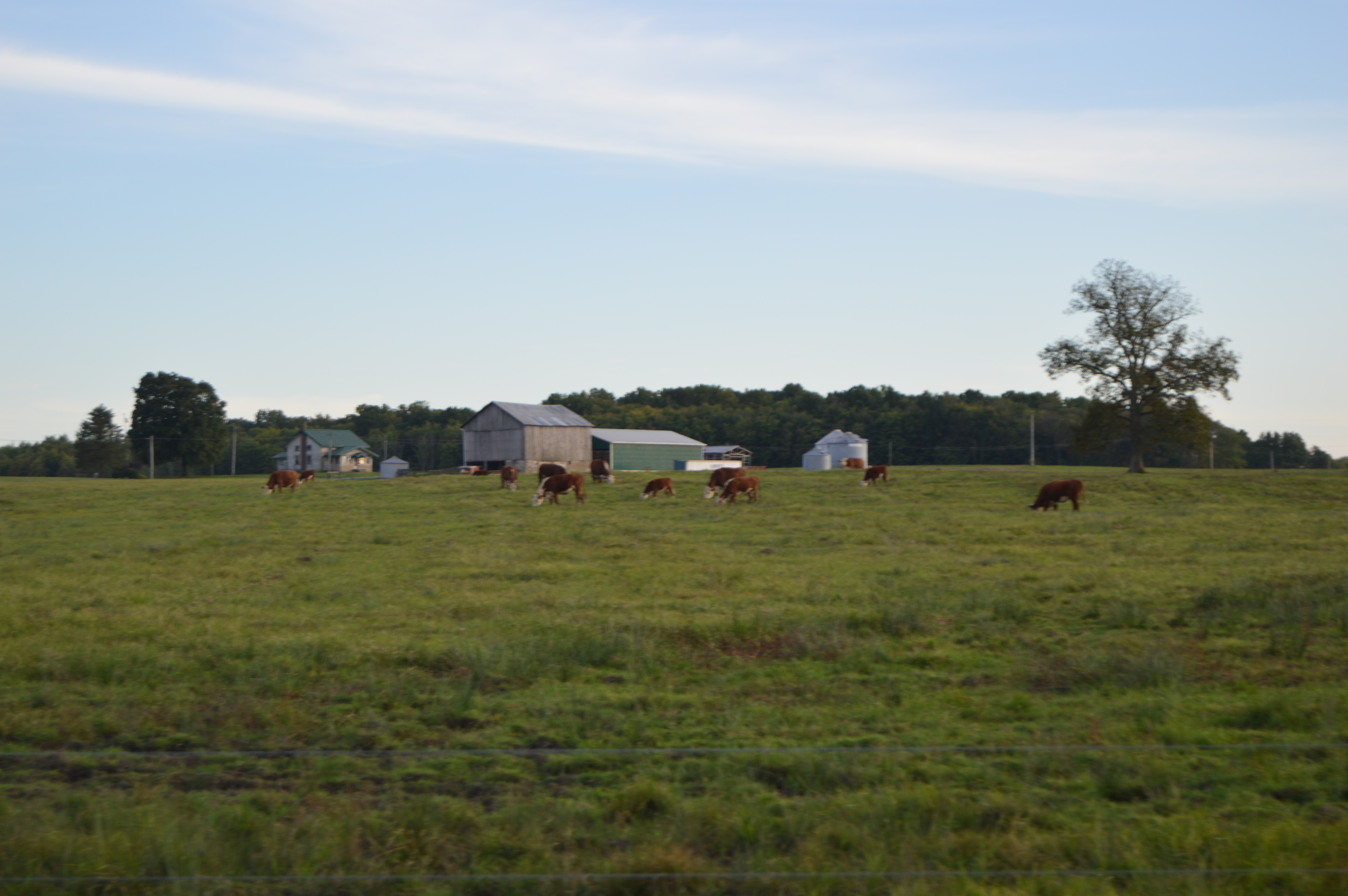
- Cattle pasture west of Stoneboro

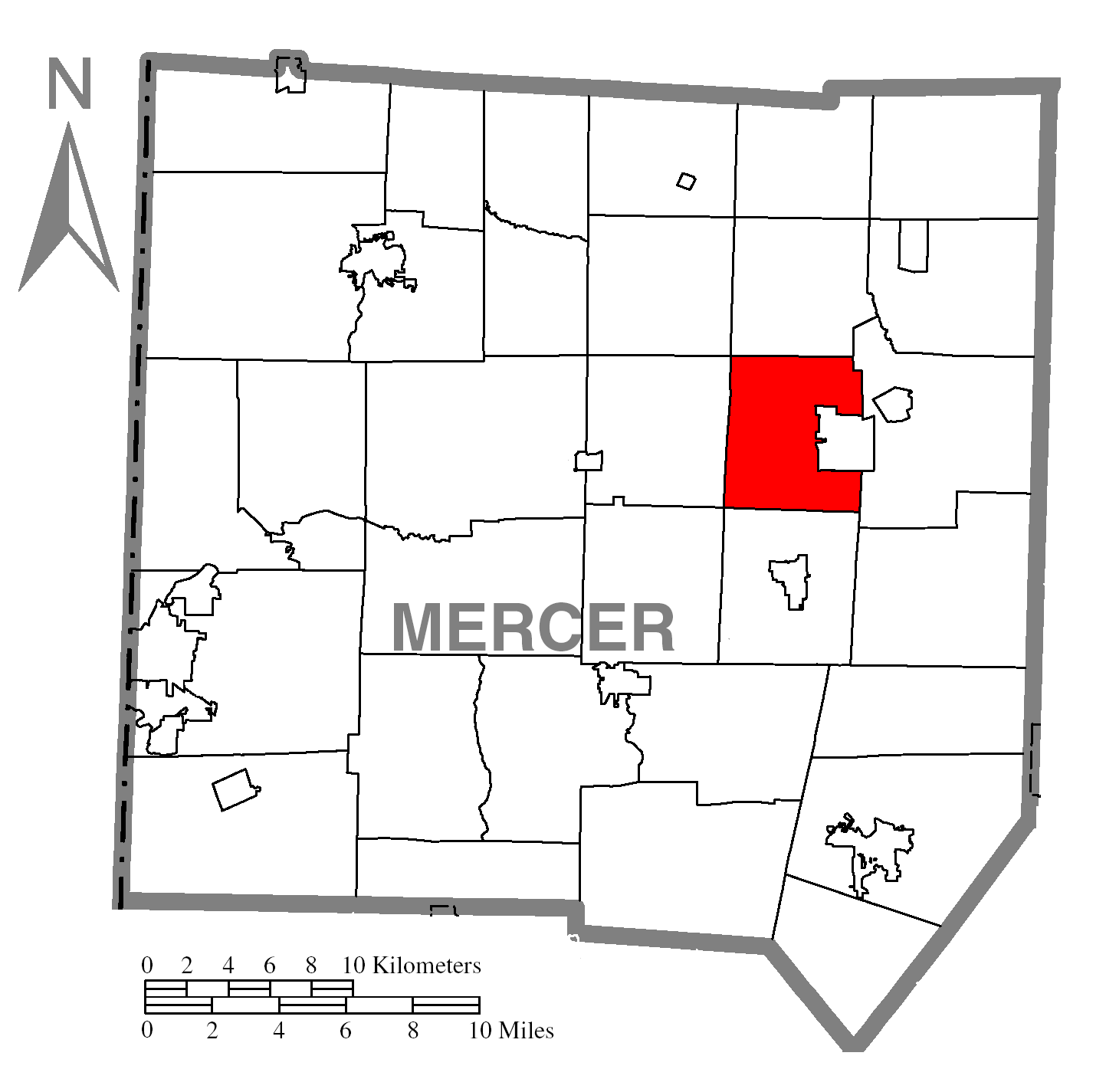
- Location of Lake Township in Mercer County

- Location of Mercer County in Pennsylvania
- Country: United States
- State: Pennsylvania
- County: Mercer County

Area
  - Total: 16.53 sq mi (42.80 km^{2})
  - Land: 16.39 sq mi (42.44 km^{2})
  - Water: 0.14 sq mi (0.36 km^{2})

Population (2020)
  - Total: 702
  - Estimate (2023): 690
  - Density: 47.4/sq mi (18.29/km^{2})
- Time zone: UTC-4 (EST)
  - Summer (DST): UTC-5 (EDT)
- Area code: 724
- FIPS code: 42-085-40928
- Website: http://www.laketownshipmercercounty.com/

Historical population
Census	Pop.	Note	%±
2000	706		—
2010	780		10.5%
2020	702		−10.0%
2023 (est.)	690		−1.7%
U.S. Decennial Census

Lake Township is a township in Mercer County, Pennsylvania, United States. The population was 702 at the 2020 census, a decline from the figure of 780 in 2010.

== Geography ==
According to the United States Census Bureau, the township has a total area of 16.0 square miles (41 km^{2}), of which 15.9 square miles (41 km^{2}) is land and 0.1 square miles (0.26 km^{2}) (0.94%) is water.

== Demographics ==
As of the census of 2000, there were 706 people, 232 households, and 187 families residing in the township. The population density was 44.5 inhabitants per square mile (17.2/km^{2}). There were 246 housing units at an average density of 15.5/sq mi (6.0/km^{2}). The racial makeup of the township was 98.44% White, 0.57% African American, and 0.99% from two or more races.

There were 232 households, out of which 37.1% had children under the age of 18 living with them, 72.8% were married couples living together, 5.2% had a female householder with no husband present, and 19.0% were non-families. 16.4% of all households were made up of individuals, and 8.6% had someone living alone who was 65 years of age or older. The average household size was 3.04 and the average family size was 3.40.

In the township the population was spread out, with 31.4% under the age of 18, 7.4% from 18 to 24, 25.2% from 25 to 44, 23.1% from 45 to 64, and 12.9% who were 65 years of age or older. The median age was 35 years. For every 100 females there were 99.4 males. For every 100 females age 18 and over, there were 98.4 males.

The median income for a household in the township was $36,591, and the median income for a family was $41,875. Males had a median income of $30,417 versus $19,821 for females. The per capita income for the township was $14,690. About 5.5% of families and 10.4% of the population were below the poverty line, including 15.6% of those under age 18 and 6.7% of those age 65 or over.
