= Sandy Lake, Pennsylvania =

Borough in Pennsylvania, US

- Borough
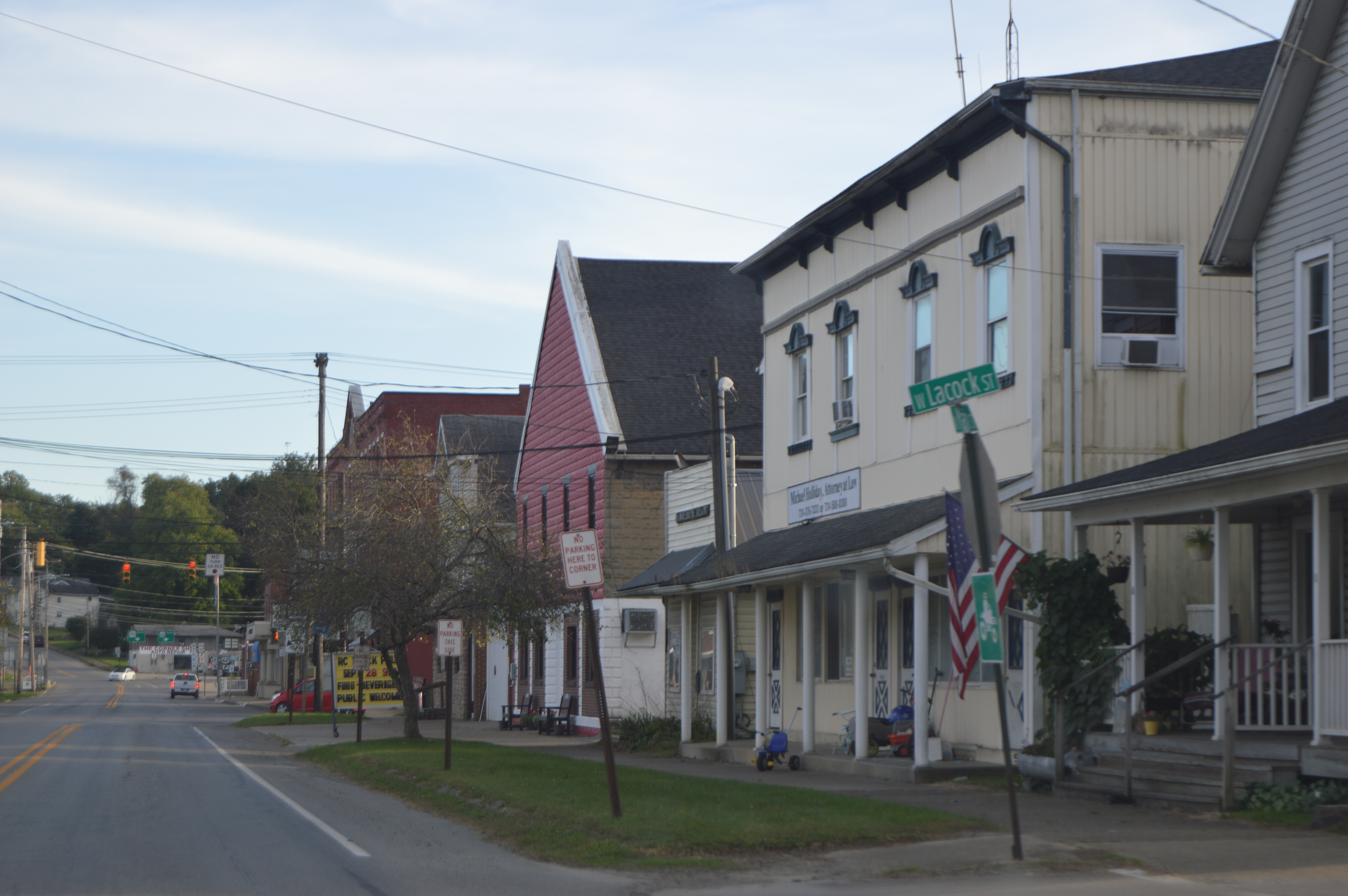
- Commercial buildings on Main Street

- Location of Sandy Lake in Mercer County, Pennsylvania.
- Coordinates: 41°21′4″N 80°5′0″W
- Country: United States
- State: Pennsylvania
- County: Mercer
- Established: 1849

Government
  - Mayor: Mary Barrick

Area
  - Total: 0.83 sq mi (2.16 km^{2})
  - Land: 0.83 sq mi (2.16 km^{2})
  - Water: 0 sq mi (0.00 km^{2})
- Elevation (center of borough): 1,160 ft (350 m)
- Highest elevation (northwest border): 1,380 ft (420 m)
- Lowest elevation (Sandy Creek): 1,150 ft (350 m)

Population (2020)
  - Total: 649
  - Density: 779.9/sq mi (301.12/km^{2})
- Time zone: UTC-4 (EST)
  - Summer (DST): UTC-5 (EDT)
- Zip code: 16145
- Area code: 724
- FIPS code: 42-67848
- Website: http://sandylakeborough.com

Sandy Lake is a borough in eastern Mercer County, Pennsylvania, United States. It was established in 1849. The population was 649 at the 2020 census. It is part of the Hermitage micropolitan area.

== Geography ==
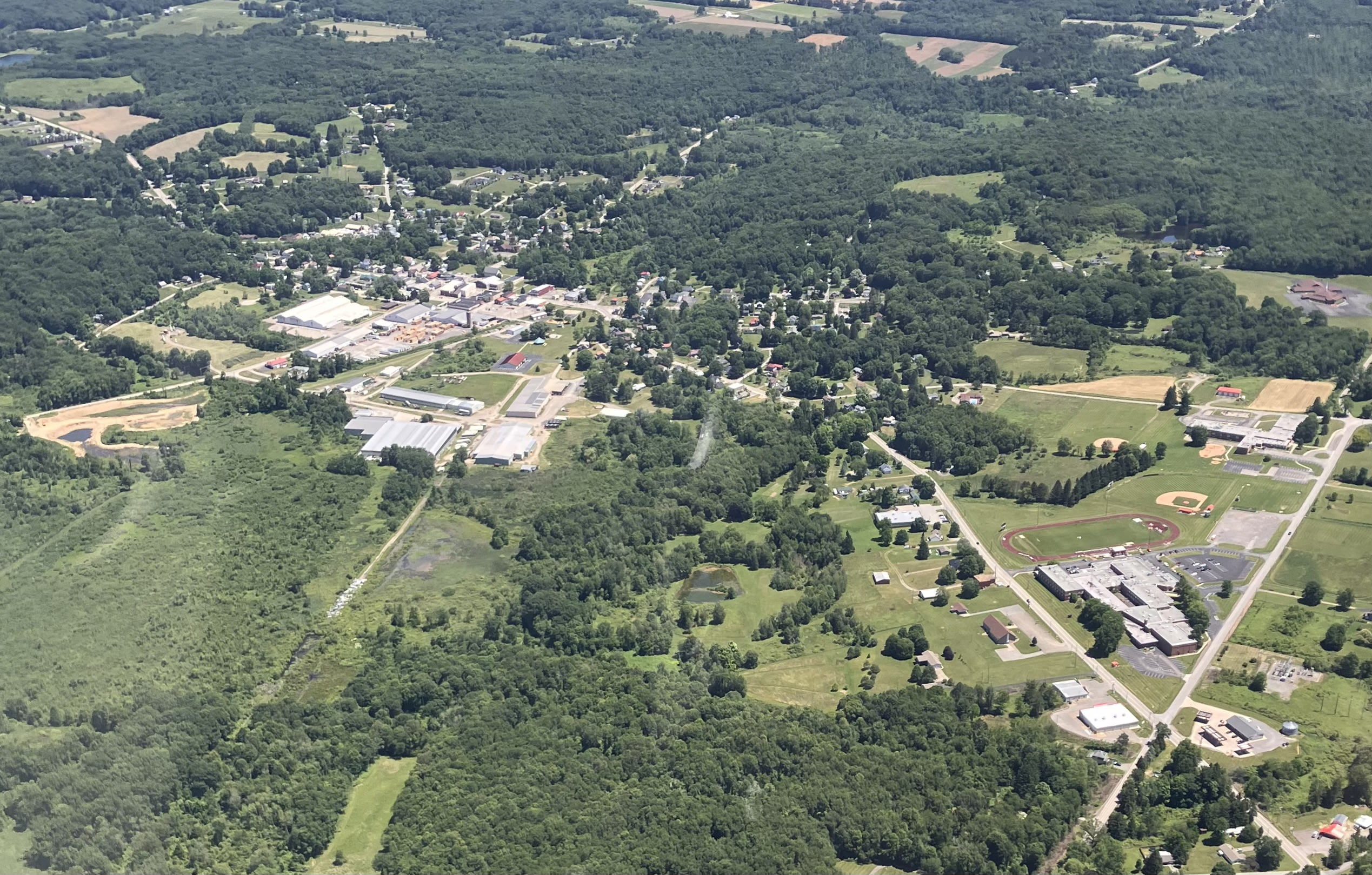
Sandy Lake (top left) and Oakview Elementary School (bottom right) in 2024, photographed from 2000ft above the ground.

Sandy Lake is located at 41°21′04″N 80°05′00″W (41.351165, -80.083220).

According to the United States Census Bureau, the borough has a total area of 0.8 square miles (2.1 km^{2}), all land.

== Demographics ==
Historical population
Census	Pop.	Note	%±
1870	428		—
1880	730		70.6%
1890	721		−1.2%
1900	632		−12.3%
1910	639		1.1%
1920	645		0.9%
1930	679		5.3%
1940	718		5.7%
1950	767		6.8%
1960	838		9.3%
1970	772		−7.9%
1980	779		0.9%
1990	722		−7.3%
2000	743		2.9%
2010	659		−11.3%
2020	649		−1.5%
2021 (est.)	643	▼	−0.9%
U.S. Decennial Census

As of the census of 2000, there were 743 people, 298 households, and 211 families residing in the borough. The population density was 896.4 inhabitants per square mile (346.1/km^{2}). There were 330 housing units at an average density of 398.1 per square mile (153.7/km^{2}). The racial makeup of the borough was 99.33% White, 0.13% African American, 0.40% Asian, and 0.13% from two or more races. Hispanic or Latino of any race were 0.13% of the population.

There were 298 households, out of which 36.2% had children under the age of 18 living with them, 55.0% were married couples living together, 14.4% had a female householder with no husband present, and 28.9% were non-families. 24.5% of all households were made up of individuals, and 10.7% had someone living alone who was 65 years of age or older. The average household size was 2.49 and the average family size was 2.94.

In the borough the population was spread out, with 26.6% under the age of 18, 7.8% from 18 to 24, 27.3% from 25 to 44, 21.0% from 45 to 64, and 17.2% who were 65 years of age or older. The median age was 37 years. For every 100 females there were 85.8 males. For every 100 females age 18 and over, there were 87.9 males.

The median income for a household in the borough was $34,231, and the median income for a family was $38,958. Males had a median income of $32,159 versus $19,712 for females. The per capita income for the borough was $15,460. About 12.7% of families and 16.6% of the population were below the poverty line, including 30.0% of those under age 18 and 11.6% of those age 65 or over.

== Notable persons ==
- Terry Turner, professional baseball player
