= Hopewell Township, Washington County, Pennsylvania =

Township in Pennsylvania, US

Hopewell Township
- Township
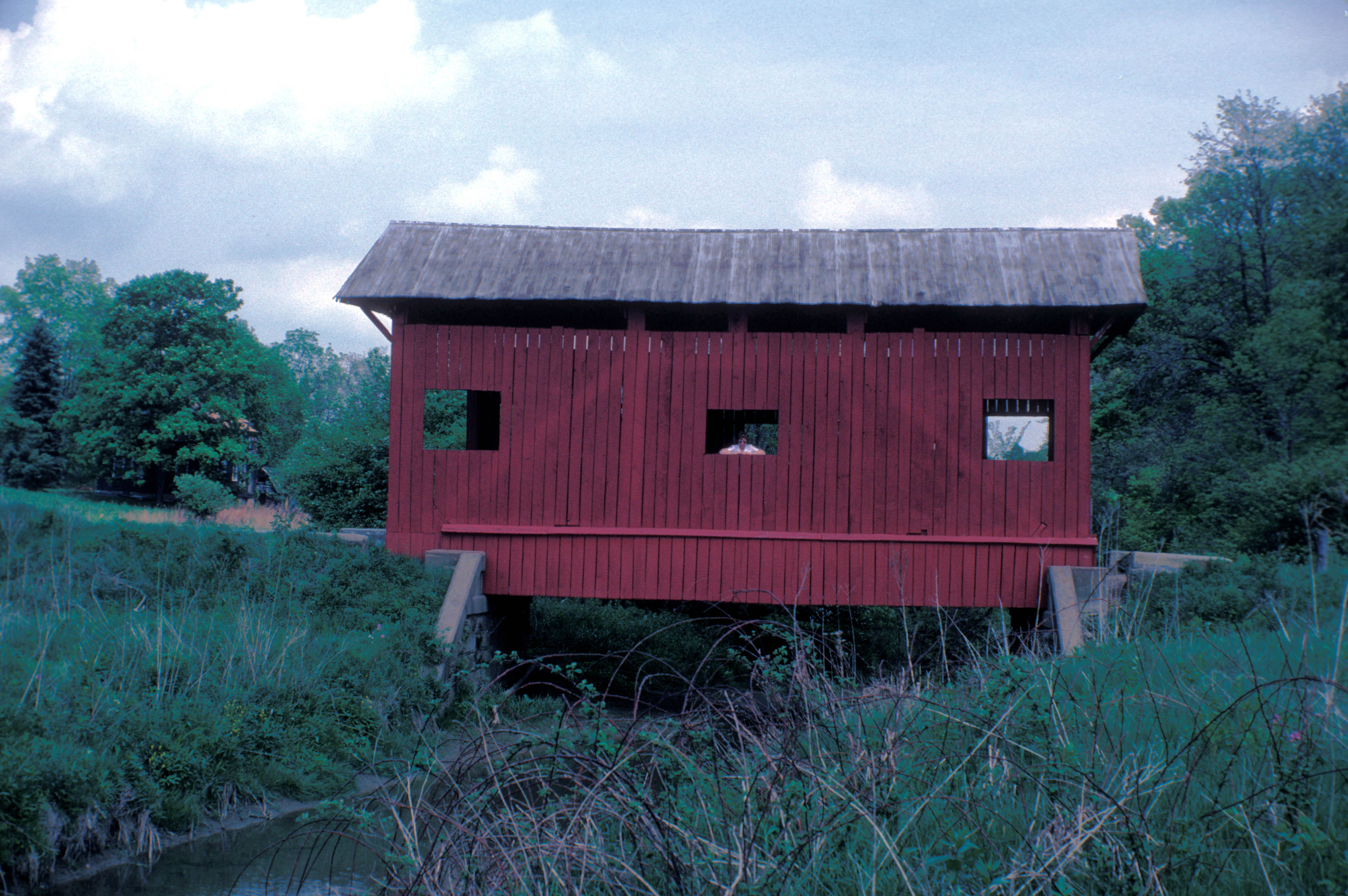
- Wilson's Mill Covered Bridge

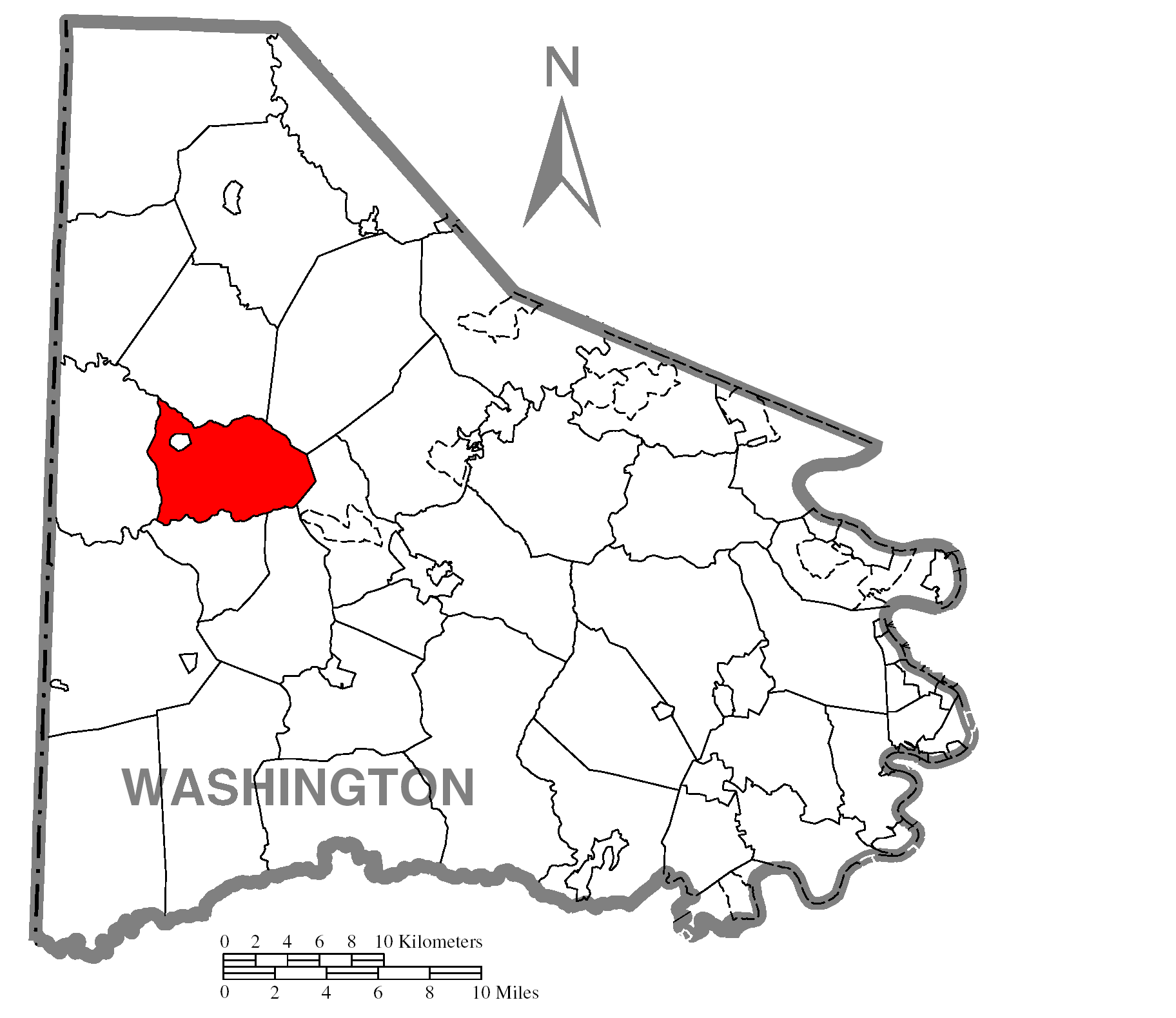
- Location of Hopewell Township in Washington County

- Location of Washington County in Pennsylvania
- Country: United States
- State: Pennsylvania
- County: Washington County

Area
  - Total: 20.55 sq mi (53.23 km^{2})
  - Land: 20.55 sq mi (53.23 km^{2})
  - Water: 0 sq mi (0.00 km^{2})

Population (2020)
  - Total: 853 ▼
  - Estimate (2021): 938
  - Density: 45.1/sq mi (17.41/km^{2})
- Time zone: UTC-4 (EST)
  - Summer (DST): UTC-5 (EDT)
- Area code: 724
- FIPS code: 42-125-35696
- Website: Township website

Historical population
Census	Pop.	Note	%±
2000	992		—
2010	957		−3.5%
2020	853		−10.9%
2025 (est.)	862		1.1%
U.S. Decennial Census

Hopewell Township is a township in Washington County, Pennsylvania, United States. The population was 853 at the 2020 census.

== History ==
The Wilson's Mill Covered Bridge was listed on the National Register of Historic Places in 1979.

== Geography ==
According to the United States Census Bureau, the township has a total area of 20.5 square miles (53 km^{2}), all of it land.

== Demographics ==
At the 2000 census there were 992 people, 354 households, and 304 families living in the township. The population density was 48.3 people per square mile (18.6 people/km^{2}). There were 370 housing units at an average density of 18.0 per square mile (6.9/km^{2}). The racial makeup of the township was 98.89% White, 0.40% African American, and 0.71% from two or more races. Hispanic or Latino of any race were 0.20%. 13% of Hopewell Township reported Scotch-Irish ancestry, the second largest percentage for any populated place in the United States. An additional 15% reported Irish ancestry and 2% reported Scottish ancestry.

Of the 354 households 35.0% had children under the age of 18 living with them, 74.9% were married couples living together, 6.2% had a female householder with no husband present, and 14.1% were non-families. 11.6% of households were one person and 5.1% were one person aged 65 or older. The average household size was 2.80 and the average family size was 3.01.

The age distribution was 24.0% under the age of 18, 8.6% from 18 to 24, 27.5% from 25 to 44, 26.7% from 45 to 64, and 13.2% 65 or older. The median age was 40 years. For every 100 females there were 107.5 males. For every 100 females age 18 and over, there were 105.4 males.

The median household income was $42,411 and the median family income was $45,673. Males had a median income of $33,250 versus $24,750 for females. The per capita income for the township was $16,708. About 4.9% of families and 7.8% of the population were below the poverty line, including 13.3% of those under age 18 and 10.2% of those age 65 or over.
