= List of townships in Pennsylvania =

Pennsylvania townships
- Map of all Pennsylvania municipal borders (township, borough, city etc)
- Category: Second-level administrative division
- Location: Pennsylvania
- Created: 17th century
- Number: 1,545
- Populations: 16 (West Keating Township) – 85,681 (Upper Darby Township)
- Areas: 0.4 square miles (1.0 km^{2}) (West Lebanon Township) – 157 square miles (410 km^{2}) (Shippen Township)
- Government: Township government

The U.S. state of Pennsylvania is divided into 1,545 townships, located in 66 of Pennsylvania's 67 counties. For listings of townships in individual counties, see the category Townships in Pennsylvania by county.

Township	County
Abbott	Potter
Abington	Montgomery
Adams	Butler
Adams	Cambria
Adams	Snyder
Addison	Somerset
Albany	Berks
Albany	Bradford
Aleppo	Allegheny
Aleppo	Greene
Allegany	Potter
Allegheny	Blair
Allegheny	Butler
Allegheny	Cambria
Allegheny	Somerset
Allegheny	Venango
Allegheny	Westmoreland
Allen	Northampton
Allison	Clinton
Alsace	Berks
Amity	Berks
Amity	Erie
Amwell	Washington
Annin	McKean
Annville	Lebanon
Anthony	Lycoming
Anthony	Montour
Antis	Blair
Antrim	Franklin
Apolacon	Susquehanna
Ararat	Susquehanna
Armagh	Mifflin
Armenia	Bradford
Armstrong	Indiana
Armstrong	Lycoming
Ashland	Clarion
Aston	Delaware
Asylum	Bradford
Athens	Bradford
Athens	Crawford
Auburn	Susquehanna
Ayr	Fulton
Bald Eagle	Clinton
Baldwin	Allegheny
Banks	Carbon
Banks	Indiana
Barnett	Forest
Barnett	Jefferson
Barr	Cambria
Barree	Huntingdon
Barrett	Monroe
Barry	Schuylkill
Bart	Lancaster
Bastress	Lycoming
Beale	Juniata
Bear Creek	Luzerne
Beaver	Clarion
Beaver	Columbia
Beaver	Crawford
Beaver	Jefferson
Beaver	Snyder
Beccaria	Clearfield
Bedford	Bedford
Bedminster	Bucks
Beech Creek	Clinton
Belfast	Fulton
Bell	Clearfield
Bell	Jefferson
Bell	Westmoreland
Benezette	Elk
Benner	Centre
Bensalem	Bucks
Benton	Columbia
Benton	Lackawanna
Berlin	Wayne
Bern	Berks
Berwick	Adams
Bethel	Armstrong
Bethel	Berks
Bethel	Delaware
Bethel	Fulton
Bethel	Lebanon
Bethlehem	Northampton
Bigler	Clearfield
Bingham	Potter
Birmingham	Chester
Black Creek	Luzerne
Black Lick	Indiana
Black	Somerset
Blacklick	Cambria
Blaine	Washington
Blair	Blair
Bloom	Clearfield
Bloomfield	Bedford
Bloomfield	Crawford
Blooming Grove	Pike
Bloss	Tioga
Blythe	Schuylkill
Boggs	Armstrong
Boggs	Centre
Boggs	Clearfield
Bradford	Clearfield
Bradford	McKean
Brady	Butler
Brady	Clarion
Brady	Clearfield
Brady	Huntingdon
Brady	Lycoming
Bradys Bend	Armstrong
Braintrim	Wyoming
Branch	Schuylkill
Bratton	Mifflin
Brecknock	Berks
Brecknock	Lancaster
Briar Creek	Columbia
Bridgeton	Bucks
Bridgewater	Susquehanna
Brighton	Beaver
Bristol	Bucks
Broad Top	Bedford
Brokenstraw	Warren
Brookfield	Tioga
Brooklyn	Susquehanna
Brothersvalley	Somerset
Brown	Lycoming
Brown	Mifflin
Brownsville	Fayette
Brush Creek	Fulton
Brush Valley	Indiana
Buck	Luzerne
Buckingham	Bucks
Buckingham	Wayne
Buffalo	Butler
Buffalo	Perry
Buffalo	Union
Buffalo	Washington
Buffington	Indiana
Bullskin	Fayette
Burlington	Bradford
Burnside	Centre
Burnside	Clearfield
Burrell	Armstrong
Burrell	Indiana
Bushkill	Northampton
Butler	Adams
Butler	Butler
Butler	Luzerne
Butler	Schuylkill
Cadogan	Armstrong
Caernarvon	Berks
Caernarvon	Lancaster
Caln	Chester
Cambria	Cambria
Cambridge	Crawford
Canaan	Wayne
Canal	Venango
Canoe	Indiana
Canton	Bradford
Canton	Washington
Carbon	Huntingdon
Carbondale	Lackawanna
Carroll	Perry
Carroll	Washington
Carroll	York
Cascade	Lycoming
Cass	Huntingdon
Cass	Schuylkill
Castanea	Clinton
Catawissa	Columbia
Catharine	Blair
Cecil	Washington
Center	Beaver
Center	Butler
Center	Greene
Center	Indiana
Center	Snyder
Centre	Berks
Centre	Perry
Ceres	McKean
Chadds Ford	Delaware
Chanceford	York
Chapman	Clinton
Chapman	Snyder
Charleston	Tioga
Charlestown	Chester
Chartiers	Washington
Chatham	Tioga
Cheltenham	Montgomery
Cherry Grove	Warren
Cherry Ridge	Wayne
Cherry	Butler
Cherry	Sullivan
Cherryhill	Indiana
Cherrytree	Venango
Chest	Cambria
Chest	Clearfield
Chester	Delaware
Chestnuthill	Monroe
Chippewa	Beaver
Choconut	Susquehanna
Clara	Potter
Clarion	Clarion
Clay	Butler
Clay	Huntingdon
Clay	Lancaster
Clearfield	Butler
Clearfield	Cambria
Cleveland	Columbia
Clifford	Susquehanna
Clifton	Lackawanna
Clinton	Butler
Clinton	Lycoming
Clinton	Venango
Clinton	Wayne
Clinton	Wyoming
Clover	Jefferson
Clymer	Tioga
Coal	Northumberland
Codorus	York
Cogan House	Lycoming
Cold Spring	Lebanon
Colebrook	Clinton
Colebrookdale	Berks
Colerain	Bedford
Colerain	Lancaster
College	Centre
Colley	Sullivan
Collier	Allegheny
Columbia	Bradford
Columbus	Warren
Concord	Butler
Concord	Delaware
Concord	Erie
Conemaugh	Cambria
Conemaugh	Indiana
Conemaugh	Somerset
Conestoga	Lancaster
Conewago	Adams
Conewago	Dauphin
Conewago	York
Conewango	Warren
Conneaut	Crawford
Conneaut	Erie
Connellsville	Fayette
Connoquenessing	Butler
Conoy	Lancaster
Conyngham	Columbia
Conyngham	Luzerne
Cook	Westmoreland
Cooke	Cumberland
Coolbaugh	Monroe
Coolspring	Mercer
Cooper	Clearfield
Cooper	Montour
Cornplanter	Venango
Corydon	McKean
Covington	Clearfield
Covington	Lackawanna
Covington	Tioga
Cowanshannock	Armstrong
Cranberry	Butler
Cranberry	Venango
Crawford	Clinton
Crescent	Allegheny
Cresson	Cambria
Cromwell	Huntingdon
Cross Creek	Washington
Croyle	Cambria
Cumberland	Adams
Cumberland	Greene
Cumberland Valley	Bedford
Cummings	Lycoming
Cumru	Berks
Curtin	Centre
Cussewago	Crawford
Dallas	Luzerne
Damascus	Wayne
Darby	Delaware
Darlington	Beaver
Daugherty	Beaver
Davidson	Sullivan
Dean	Cambria
Decatur	Clearfield
Decatur	Mifflin
Deer Creek	Mercer
Deerfield	Tioga
Deerfield	Warren
Delano	Schuylkill
Delaware	Juniata
Delaware	Mercer
Delaware	Northumberland
Delaware	Pike
Delmar	Tioga
Dennison	Luzerne
Derry	Dauphin
Derry	Mifflin
Derry	Montour
Derry	Westmoreland
Dickinson	Cumberland
Dimock	Susquehanna
Dingman	Pike
District	Berks
Donegal	Butler
Donegal	Washington
Donegal	Westmoreland
Dorrance	Luzerne
Douglass	Berks
Douglass	Montgomery
Dover	York
Doylestown	Bucks
Dreher	Wayne
Drumore	Lancaster
Dublin	Fulton
Dublin	Huntingdon
Dunbar	Fayette
Duncan	Tioga
Dunkard	Greene
Dunnstable	Clinton
Durham	Bucks
Dyberry	Wayne
Earl	Berks
Earl	Lancaster
East Allen	Northampton
East Bethlehem	Washington
East Bradford	Chester
East Brandywine	Chester
East Brunswick	Schuylkill
East Buffalo	Union
East Caln	Chester
East Cameron	Northumberland
East Carroll	Cambria
East Chillisquaque	Northumberland
East Cocalico	Lancaster
East Coventry	Chester
East Deer	Allegheny
East Donegal	Lancaster
East Drumore	Lancaster
East Earl	Lancaster
East Fairfield	Crawford
East Fallowfield	Chester
East Fallowfield	Crawford
East Finley	Washington
East Franklin	Armstrong
East Goshen	Chester
East Hanover	Dauphin
East Hanover	Lebanon
East Hempfield	Lancaster
East Hopewell	York
East Huntingdon	Westmoreland
East Lackawannock	Mercer
East Lampeter	Lancaster
East Mahoning	Indiana
East Manchester	York
East Marlborough	Chester
East Mead	Crawford
East Nantmeal	Chester
East Norriton	Montgomery
East Norwegian	Schuylkill
East Nottingham	Chester
East Penn	Carbon
East Pennsboro	Cumberland
East Pikeland	Chester
East Providence	Bedford
East Rockhill	Bucks
East St. Clair	Bedford
East Taylor	Cambria
East Union	Schuylkill
East Vincent	Chester
East Wheatfield	Indiana
East Whiteland	Chester
Easttown	Chester
Eaton	Wyoming
Eden	Lancaster
Edgmont	Delaware
Elder	Cambria
Eldred	Jefferson
Eldred	Lycoming
Eldred	McKean
Eldred	Monroe
Eldred	Schuylkill
Eldred	Warren
Elizabeth	Allegheny
Elizabeth	Lancaster
Elk Creek	Erie
Elk Lick	Somerset
Elk	Chester
Elk	Clarion
Elk	Tioga
Elk	Warren
Elkland	Sullivan
Elmhurst	Lackawanna
Ephrata	Lancaster
Eulalia	Potter
Exeter	Berks
Exeter	Luzerne
Exeter	Wyoming
Fairfield	Crawford
Fairfield	Lycoming
Fairfield	Westmoreland
Fairhope	Somerset
Fairmount	Luzerne
Fairview	Butler
Fairview	Erie
Fairview	Luzerne
Fairview	Mercer
Fairview	York
Fallowfield	Washington
Falls	Bucks
Falls	Wyoming
Fannett	Franklin
Farmington	Clarion
Farmington	Tioga
Farmington	Warren
Fawn	Allegheny
Fawn	York
Fayette	Juniata
Fell	Lackawanna
Ferguson	Centre
Ferguson	Clearfield
Fermanagh	Juniata
Findlay	Allegheny
Findley	Mercer
Fishing Creek	Columbia
Forest Lake	Susquehanna
Forks	Northampton
Forks	Sullivan
Forkston	Wyoming
Forward	Allegheny
Forward	Butler
Foster	Luzerne
Foster	McKean
Foster	Schuylkill
Fox	Elk
Fox	Sullivan
Frailey	Schuylkill
Franconia	Montgomery
Franklin	Adams
Franklin	Beaver
Franklin	Bradford
Franklin	Butler
Franklin	Carbon
Franklin	Chester
Franklin	Columbia
Franklin	Erie
Franklin	Fayette
Franklin	Greene
Franklin	Huntingdon
Franklin	Luzerne
Franklin	Lycoming
Franklin	Snyder
Franklin	Susquehanna
Franklin	York
Frankstown	Blair
Frazer	Allegheny
Freedom	Adams
Freedom	Blair
Freehold	Warren
Freeport	Greene
French Creek	Mercer
Frenchcreek	Venango
Fulton	Lancaster
Gaines	Tioga
Gallagher	Clinton
Gallitzin	Cambria
Gamble	Lycoming
Gaskill	Jefferson
Genesee	Potter
Georges	Fayette
German	Fayette
Germany	Adams
Gibson	Cameron
Gibson	Susquehanna
Gilmore	Greene
Gilpin	Armstrong
Girard	Clearfield
Girard	Erie
Glade	Warren
Glenburn	Lackawanna
Goshen	Clearfield
Graham	Clearfield
Grant	Indiana
Granville	Bradford
Granville	Mifflin
Gray	Greene
Great Bend	Susquehanna
Green	Forest
Green	Indiana
Greene	Beaver
Greene	Clinton
Greene	Erie
Greene	Franklin
Greene	Greene
Greene	Mercer
Greene	Pike
Greenfield	Blair
Greenfield	Erie
Greenfield	Lackawanna
Greenville	Somerset
Greenwich	Berks
Greenwood	Clearfield
Greenwood	Columbia
Greenwood	Crawford
Greenwood	Juniata
Greenwood	Perry
Gregg	Centre
Gregg	Union
Grove	Cameron
Grugan	Clinton
Guilford	Franklin
Gulich	Clearfield
Haines	Centre
Halfmoon	Centre
Halifax	Dauphin
Hamilton	Adams
Hamilton	Franklin
Hamilton	McKean
Hamilton	Monroe
Hamilton	Tioga
Hamiltonban	Adams
Hamlin	McKean
Hampden	Cumberland
Hampton	Allegheny
Hanover	Beaver
Hanover	Lehigh
Hanover	Luzerne
Hanover	Northampton
Hanover	Washington
Harborcreek	Erie
Harford	Susquehanna
Harmar	Allegheny
Harmony	Beaver
Harmony	Forest
Harmony	Susquehanna
Harris	Centre
Harrison	Allegheny
Harrison	Bedford
Harrison	Potter
Hartley	Union
Hatfield	Montgomery
Haverford	Delaware
Haycock	Bucks
Hayfield	Crawford
Hazle	Luzerne
Heath	Jefferson
Hebron	Potter
Hector	Potter
Hegins	Schuylkill
Heidelberg	Berks
Heidelberg	Lebanon
Heidelberg	Lehigh
Heidelberg	York
Hellam	York
Hemlock	Columbia
Hempfield	Mercer
Hempfield	Westmoreland
Henderson	Huntingdon
Henderson	Jefferson
Henry Clay	Fayette
Hepburn	Lycoming
Hereford	Berks
Herrick	Bradford
Herrick	Susquehanna
Hickory	Forest
Hickory	Lawrence
Highland	Adams
Highland	Chester
Highland	Clarion
Highland	Elk
Hillsgrove	Sullivan
Hilltown	Bucks
Hollenback	Luzerne
Homer	Potter
Honey Brook	Chester
Hopewell	Beaver
Hopewell	Bedford
Hopewell	Cumberland
Hopewell	Huntingdon
Hopewell	Washington
Hopewell	York
Horsham	Montgomery
Horton	Elk
Hovey	Armstrong
Howard	Centre
Howe	Forest
Howe	Perry
Hubley	Schuylkill
Hunlock	Luzerne
Huntington	Adams
Huntington	Luzerne
Huston	Blair
Huston	Centre
Huston	Clearfield
Independence	Beaver
Independence	Washington
Indiana	Allegheny
Irwin	Venango
Jackson	Butler
Jackson	Cambria
Jackson	Columbia
Jackson	Dauphin
Jackson	Greene
Jackson	Huntingdon
Jackson	Lebanon
Jackson	Luzerne
Jackson	Lycoming
Jackson	Mercer
Jackson	Monroe
Jackson	Northumberland
Jackson	Perry
Jackson	Snyder
Jackson	Susquehanna
Jackson	Tioga
Jackson	Venango
Jackson	York
Jay	Elk
Jefferson	Berks
Jefferson	Butler
Jefferson	Dauphin
Jefferson	Fayette
Jefferson	Greene
Jefferson	Lackawanna
Jefferson	Mercer
Jefferson	Somerset
Jefferson	Washington
Jenkins	Luzerne
Jenks	Forest
Jenner	Somerset
Jessup	Susquehanna
Jones	Elk
Jordan	Clearfield
Jordan	Lycoming
Jordan	Northumberland
Juniata	Bedford
Juniata	Blair
Juniata	Huntingdon
Juniata	Perry
Karthaus	Clearfield
Keating	McKean
Keating	Potter
Kelly	Union
Kennedy	Allegheny
Kennett	Chester
Kidder	Carbon
Kilbuck	Allegheny
Kimmel	Bedford
King	Bedford
Kingsley	Forest
Kingston	Luzerne
Kiskiminetas	Armstrong
Kittanning	Armstrong
Kline	Schuylkill
Knox	Clarion
Knox	Clearfield
Knox	Jefferson
La Plume	Lackawanna
Lack	Juniata
Lackawannock	Mercer
Lackawaxen	Pike
Lafayette	McKean
Lake	Luzerne
Lake	Mercer
Lake	Wayne
Lamar	Clinton
Lancaster	Butler
Lancaster	Lancaster
Laporte	Sullivan
Larimer	Somerset
Lathrop	Susquehanna
Latimore	Adams
Lausanne	Carbon
Lawrence Park	Erie
Lawrence	Clearfield
Lawrence	Tioga
Leacock	Lancaster
Lebanon	Wayne
LeBoeuf	Erie
Leet	Allegheny
Lehigh	Carbon
Lehigh	Northampton
Lehigh	Wayne
Lehman	Luzerne
Lehman	Pike
Leidy	Clinton
Lemon	Wyoming
Lenox	Susquehanna
Leroy	Bradford
Letterkenny	Franklin
Lewis	Lycoming
Lewis	Northumberland
Lewis	Union
Liberty	Adams
Liberty	Bedford
Liberty	Centre
Liberty	McKean
Liberty	Mercer
Liberty	Montour
Liberty	Susquehanna
Liberty	Tioga
Licking Creek	Fulton
Licking	Clarion
Ligonier	Westmoreland
Limerick	Montgomery
Limestone	Clarion
Limestone	Lycoming
Limestone	Montour
Limestone	Union
Limestone	Warren
Lincoln	Bedford
Lincoln	Huntingdon
Lincoln	Somerset
Litchfield	Bradford
Little Beaver	Lawrence
Little Britain	Lancaster
Little Mahanoy	Northumberland
Liverpool	Perry
Locust	Columbia
Logan	Blair
Logan	Clinton
Logan	Huntingdon
London Britain	Chester
London Grove	Chester
Londonderry	Bedford
Londonderry	Chester
Londonderry	Dauphin
Longswamp	Berks
Lower Allen	Cumberland
Lower Alsace	Berks
Lower Augusta	Northumberland
Lower Chanceford	York
Lower Chichester	Delaware
Lower Frankford	Cumberland
Lower Frederick	Montgomery
Lower Gwynedd	Montgomery
Lower Heidelberg	Berks
Lower Macungie	Lehigh
Lower Mahanoy	Northumberland
Lower Makefield	Bucks
Lower Merion	Montgomery
Lower Mifflin	Cumberland
Lower Milford	Lehigh
Lower Moreland	Montgomery
Lower Mount Bethel	Northampton
Lower Nazareth	Northampton
Lower Oxford	Chester
Lower Paxton	Dauphin
Lower Pottsgrove	Montgomery
Lower Providence	Montgomery
Lower Salford	Montgomery
Lower Saucon	Northampton
Lower Southampton	Bucks
Lower Swatara	Dauphin
Lower Towamensing	Carbon
Lower Turkeyfoot	Somerset
Lower Tyrone	Fayette
Lower Windsor	York
Lower Yoder	Cambria
Lowhill	Lehigh
Loyalhanna	Westmoreland
Loyalsock	Lycoming
Lumber	Cameron
Lurgan	Franklin
Luzerne	Fayette
Lycoming	Lycoming
Lykens	Dauphin
Lynn	Lehigh
Madison	Armstrong
Madison	Clarion
Madison	Columbia
Madison	Lackawanna
Mahanoy	Schuylkill
Mahoning	Armstrong
Mahoning	Carbon
Mahoning	Lawrence
Mahoning	Montour
Maidencreek	Berks
Main	Columbia
Manchester	Wayne
Manchester	York
Manheim	Lancaster
Manheim	York
Mann	Bedford
Manor	Armstrong
Manor	Lancaster
Marion	Beaver
Marion	Berks
Marion	Butler
Marion	Centre
Marlborough	Montgomery
Marple	Delaware
Marshall	Allegheny
Martic	Lancaster
Maxatawny	Berks
Mayberry	Montour
McCalmont	Jefferson
McCandless	Allegheny
McHenry	Lycoming
McIntyre	Lycoming
McKean	Erie
McNett	Lycoming
Mead	Warren
Mehoopany	Wyoming
Menallen	Adams
Menallen	Fayette
Menno	Mifflin
Mercer	Butler
Meshoppen	Wyoming
Metal	Franklin
Middle Paxton	Dauphin
Middle Smithfield	Monroe
Middle Taylor	Cambria
Middlebury	Tioga
Middlecreek	Snyder
Middlecreek	Somerset
Middlesex	Butler
Middlesex	Cumberland
Middletown	Bucks
Middletown	Delaware
Middletown	Susquehanna
Mifflin	Columbia
Mifflin	Dauphin
Mifflin	Lycoming
Miles	Centre
Milford	Bucks
Milford	Juniata
Milford	Pike
Milford	Somerset
Mill Creek	Lycoming
Mill Creek	Mercer
Millcreek	Clarion
Millcreek	Erie
Millcreek	Lebanon
Miller	Huntingdon
Miller	Perry
Millstone	Elk
Mineral	Venango
Monaghan	York
Monongahela	Greene
Monroe	Bedford
Monroe	Bradford
Monroe	Clarion
Monroe	Cumberland
Monroe	Juniata
Monroe	Snyder
Monroe	Wyoming
Montgomery	Franklin
Montgomery	Indiana
Montgomery	Montgomery
Montour	Columbia
Moon	Allegheny
Moore	Northampton
Moreland	Lycoming
Morgan	Greene
Morris	Clearfield
Morris	Greene
Morris	Huntingdon
Morris	Tioga
Morris	Washington
Mount Carmel	Northumberland
Mount Joy	Adams
Mount Joy	Lancaster
Mount Lebanon	Allegheny
Mount Pleasant	Adams
Mount Pleasant	Columbia
Mount Pleasant	Washington
Mount Pleasant	Wayne
Mount Pleasant	Westmoreland
Muddy Creek	Butler
Muhlenberg	Berks
Muncy Creek	Lycoming
Muncy	Lycoming
Munster	Cambria
Napier	Bedford
Nelson	Tioga
Nescopeck	Luzerne
Neshannock	Lawrence
Nether Providence	Delaware
Neville	Allegheny
New Britain	Bucks
New Castle	Schuylkill
New Garden	Chester
New Hanover	Montgomery
New London	Chester
New Milford	Susquehanna
New Sewickley	Beaver
New Vernon	Mercer
Newberry	York
Newlin	Chester
Newport	Luzerne
Newton	Lackawanna
Newtown	Bucks
Newtown	Delaware
Nicholson	Fayette
Nicholson	Wyoming
Nippenose	Lycoming
Nockamixon	Bucks
North Abington	Lackawanna
North Annville	Lebanon
North Beaver	Lawrence
North Bethlehem	Washington
North Branch	Wyoming
North Buffalo	Armstrong
North Centre	Columbia
North Codorus	York
North Cornwall	Lebanon
North Coventry	Chester
North East	Erie
North Fayette	Allegheny
North Franklin	Washington
North Heidelberg	Berks
North Hopewell	York
North Huntingdon	Westmoreland
North Lebanon	Lebanon
North Londonderry	Lebanon
North Mahoning	Indiana
North Manheim	Schuylkill
North Middleton	Cumberland
North Newton	Cumberland
North Sewickley	Beaver
North Shenango	Crawford
North Strabane	Washington
North Towanda	Bradford
North Union	Fayette
North Union	Schuylkill
North Versailles	Allegheny
North Whitehall	Lehigh
North Woodbury	Blair
Northampton	Bucks
Northampton	Somerset
Northeast Madison	Perry
Northmoreland	Wyoming
Norwegian	Schuylkill
Norwich	McKean
Nottingham	Washington
Noxen	Wyoming
Noyes	Clinton
Oakland	Butler
Oakland	Susquehanna
Oakland	Venango
Ogle	Somerset
O'Hara	Allegheny
Ohio	Allegheny
Oil Creek	Crawford
Oilcreek	Venango
Old Lycoming	Lycoming
Oley	Berks
Oliver	Jefferson
Oliver	Mifflin
Oliver	Perry
Oneida	Huntingdon
Ontelaunee	Berks
Orange	Columbia
Oregon	Wayne
Orwell	Bradford
Osceola	Tioga
Oswayo	Potter
Otter Creek	Mercer
Otto	McKean
Overfield	Wyoming
Overton	Bradford
Oxford	Adams
Packer	Carbon
Paint	Clarion
Paint	Somerset
Palmer	Northampton
Palmyra	Pike
Palmyra	Wayne
Paradise	Lancaster
Paradise	Monroe
Paradise	York
Parker	Butler
Parks	Armstrong
Patterson	Beaver
Patton	Centre
Paupack	Wayne
Pavia	Bedford
Peach Bottom	York
Penn Forest	Carbon
Penn Hills	Allegheny
Penn	Berks
Penn	Butler
Penn	Centre
Penn	Chester
Penn	Clearfield
Penn	Cumberland
Penn	Huntingdon
Penn	Lancaster
Penn	Lycoming
Penn	Perry
Penn	Snyder
Penn	Westmoreland
Penn	York
Pennsbury	Chester
Pequea	Lancaster
Perkiomen	Montgomery
Perry	Armstrong
Perry	Berks
Perry	Clarion
Perry	Fayette
Perry	Greene
Perry	Jefferson
Perry	Lawrence
Perry	Mercer
Perry	Snyder
Peters	Franklin
Peters	Washington
Piatt	Lycoming
Pike	Berks
Pike	Bradford
Pike	Clearfield
Pike	Potter
Pine Creek	Clinton
Pine Creek	Jefferson
Pine Grove	Schuylkill
Pine Grove	Warren
Pine	Allegheny
Pine	Armstrong
Pine	Clearfield
Pine	Columbia
Pine	Crawford
Pine	Indiana
Pine	Lycoming
Pine	Mercer
Pinegrove	Venango
Piney	Clarion
Pittsfield	Warren
Pittston	Luzerne
Plain Grove	Lawrence
Plainfield	Northampton
Plains	Luzerne
Pleasant	Warren
Pleasant Valley	Potter
Plum	Venango
Plumcreek	Armstrong
Plumstead	Bucks
Plunketts Creek	Lycoming
Plymouth	Luzerne
Plymouth	Montgomery
Pocono	Monroe
Pocopson	Chester
Point	Northumberland
Polk	Jefferson
Polk	Monroe
Portage	Cambria
Portage	Cameron
Portage	Potter
Porter	Clarion
Porter	Clinton
Porter	Huntingdon
Porter	Jefferson
Porter	Lycoming
Porter	Pike
Porter	Schuylkill
Potter	Beaver
Potter	Centre
President	Venango
Preston	Wayne
Price	Monroe
Providence	Lancaster
Pulaski	Beaver
Pulaski	Lawrence
Putnam	Tioga
Pymatuning	Mercer
Quemahoning	Somerset
Quincy	Franklin
Raccoon	Beaver
Radnor	Delaware
Ralpho	Northumberland
Randolph	Crawford
Ransom	Lackawanna
Rapho	Lancaster
Rayburn	Armstrong
Rayne	Indiana
Reade	Cambria
Reading	Adams
Redbank	Armstrong
Redbank	Clarion
Redstone	Fayette
Reed	Dauphin
Reilly	Schuylkill
Reserve	Allegheny
Rice	Luzerne
Richhill	Greene
Richland	Allegheny
Richland	Bucks
Richland	Cambria
Richland	Clarion
Richland	Venango
Richmond	Berks
Richmond	Crawford
Richmond	Tioga
Ridgebury	Bradford
Ridgway	Elk
Ridley	Delaware
Ringgold	Jefferson
Roaring Brook	Lackawanna
Roaring Creek	Columbia
Robeson	Berks
Robinson	Allegheny
Robinson	Washington
Rochester	Beaver
Rockdale	Crawford
Rockefeller	Northumberland
Rockland	Berks
Rockland	Venango
Rome	Bradford
Rome	Crawford
Rose	Jefferson
Ross	Allegheny
Ross	Luzerne
Ross	Monroe
Rostraver	Westmoreland
Roulette	Potter
Ruscombmanor	Berks
Rush	Centre
Rush	Dauphin
Rush	Northumberland
Rush	Schuylkill
Rush	Susquehanna
Rutland	Tioga
Ryan	Schuylkill
Rye	Perry
Sadsbury	Chester
Sadsbury	Crawford
Sadsbury	Lancaster
Salem	Clarion
Salem	Luzerne
Salem	Mercer
Salem	Wayne
Salem	Westmoreland
Salford	Montgomery
Salisbury	Lancaster
Salisbury	Lehigh
Saltlick	Fayette
Sandy Creek	Mercer
Sandy Lake	Mercer
Sandycreek	Venango
Saville	Perry
Schuylkill	Chester
Schuylkill	Schuylkill
Scott	Allegheny
Scott	Columbia
Scott	Lackawanna
Scott	Lawrence
Scott	Wayne
Scrubgrass	Venango
Sergeant	McKean
Sewickley	Westmoreland
Shade	Somerset
Shaler	Allegheny
Shamokin	Northumberland
Sharon	Potter
Sheffield	Warren
Shenango	Lawrence
Shenango	Mercer
Sheshequin	Bradford
Shippen	Cameron
Shippen	Tioga
Shippensburg	Cumberland
Shirley	Huntingdon
Shohola	Pike
Shrewsbury	Lycoming
Shrewsbury	Sullivan
Shrewsbury	York
Silver Lake	Susquehanna
Silver Spring	Cumberland
Skippack	Montgomery
Slippery Rock	Butler
Slippery Rock	Lawrence
Slocum	Luzerne
Smith	Washington
Smithfield	Bradford
Smithfield	Huntingdon
Smithfield	Monroe
Snake Spring	Bedford
Snow Shoe	Centre
Snyder	Blair
Snyder	Jefferson
Solebury	Bucks
Somerset	Somerset
Somerset	Washington
South Abington	Lackawanna
South Annville	Lebanon
South Beaver	Beaver
South Bend	Armstrong
South Buffalo	Armstrong
South Canaan	Wayne
South Centre	Columbia
South Coventry	Chester
South Creek	Bradford
South Fayette	Allegheny
South Franklin	Washington
South Hanover	Dauphin
South Heidelberg	Berks
South Huntingdon	Westmoreland
South Lebanon	Lebanon
South Londonderry	Lebanon
South Mahoning	Indiana
South Manheim	Schuylkill
South Middleton	Cumberland
South Newton	Cumberland
South Park	Allegheny
South Pymatuning	Mercer
South Shenango	Crawford
South Strabane	Washington
South Union	Fayette
South Versailles	Allegheny
South Whitehall	Lehigh
South Woodbury	Bedford
Southampton	Bedford
Southampton	Cumberland
Southampton	Franklin
Southampton	Somerset
Southwest Madison	Perry
Southwest	Warren
Sparta	Crawford
Spring Brook	Lackawanna
Spring Creek	Elk
Spring Creek	Warren
Spring Garden	York
Spring	Berks
Spring	Centre
Spring	Crawford
Spring	Perry
Spring	Snyder
Springdale	Allegheny
Springettsbury	York
Springfield	Bradford
Springfield	Bucks
Springfield	Delaware
Springfield	Erie
Springfield	Fayette
Springfield	Huntingdon
Springfield	Mercer
Springfield	Montgomery
Springfield	York
Springhill	Fayette
Springhill	Greene
Springville	Susquehanna
Spruce Creek	Huntingdon
Spruce Hill	Juniata
St. Clair	Westmoreland
St. Thomas	Franklin
Standing Stone	Bradford
Sterling	Wayne
Steuben	Crawford
Stevens	Bradford
Stewardson	Potter
Stewart	Fayette
Stonycreek	Cambria
Stonycreek	Somerset
Stowe	Allegheny
Straban	Adams
Strasburg	Lancaster
Stroud	Monroe
Sugar Grove	Mercer
Sugar Grove	Warren
Sugarcreek	Armstrong
Sugarloaf	Columbia
Sugarloaf	Luzerne
Sullivan	Tioga
Summerhill	Cambria
Summerhill	Crawford
Summit	Butler
Summit	Crawford
Summit	Erie
Summit	Potter
Summit	Somerset
Susquehanna	Cambria
Susquehanna	Dauphin
Susquehanna	Juniata
Susquehanna	Lycoming
Swatara	Dauphin
Swatara	Lebanon
Sweden	Potter
Sylvania	Potter
Taylor	Blair
Taylor	Centre
Taylor	Fulton
Taylor	Lawrence
Tell	Huntingdon
Terry	Bradford
Texas	Wayne
Thompson	Fulton
Thompson	Susquehanna
Thornbury	Chester
Thornbury	Delaware
Thornhurst	Lackawanna
Tilden	Berks
Tinicum	Bucks
Tinicum	Delaware
Tioga	Tioga
Tionesta	Forest
Toboyne	Perry
Toby	Clarion
Tobyhanna	Monroe
Todd	Fulton
Todd	Huntingdon
Towamencin	Montgomery
Towamensing	Carbon
Towanda	Bradford
Tredyffrin	Chester
Tremont	Schuylkill
Triumph	Warren
Troy	Bradford
Troy	Crawford
Tulpehocken	Berks
Tunkhannock	Monroe
Tunkhannock	Wyoming
Turbett	Juniata
Turbot	Northumberland
Tuscarora	Bradford
Tuscarora	Juniata
Tuscarora	Perry
Tyrone	Adams
Tyrone	Blair
Tyrone	Perry
Ulster	Bradford
Ulysses	Potter
Union	Adams
Union	Berks
Union	Centre
Union	Clearfield
Union	Crawford
Union	Erie
Union	Fulton
Union	Huntingdon
Union	Jefferson
Union	Lawrence
Union	Lebanon
Union	Luzerne
Union	Mifflin
Union	Schuylkill
Union	Snyder
Union	Tioga
Union	Union
Union	Washington
Unity	Westmoreland
Upper Allen	Cumberland
Upper Augusta	Northumberland
Upper Bern	Berks
Upper Burrell	Westmoreland
Upper Chichester	Delaware
Upper Darby	Delaware
Upper Dublin	Montgomery
Upper Fairfield	Lycoming
Upper Frankford	Cumberland
Upper Frederick	Montgomery
Upper Gwynedd	Montgomery
Upper Hanover	Montgomery
Upper Leacock	Lancaster
Upper Macungie	Lehigh
Upper Mahanoy	Northumberland
Upper Mahantongo	Schuylkill
Upper Makefield	Bucks
Upper Merion	Montgomery
Upper Mifflin	Cumberland
Upper Milford	Lehigh
Upper Moreland	Montgomery
Upper Mount Bethel	Northampton
Upper Nazareth	Northampton
Upper Oxford	Chester
Upper Paxton	Dauphin
Upper Pottsgrove	Montgomery
Upper Providence	Delaware
Upper Providence	Montgomery
Upper Salford	Montgomery
Upper Saucon	Lehigh
Upper Southampton	Bucks
Upper St. Clair	Allegheny
Upper Tulpehocken	Berks
Upper Turkeyfoot	Somerset
Upper Tyrone	Fayette
Upper Uwchlan	Chester
Upper Yoder	Cambria
Uwchlan	Chester
Valley	Armstrong
Valley	Chester
Valley	Montour
Vanport	Beaver
Venango	Butler
Venango	Crawford
Venango	Erie
Vernon	Crawford
Victory	Venango
Walker	Centre
Walker	Huntingdon
Walker	Juniata
Walker	Schuylkill
Wallace	Chester
Ward	Tioga
Warminster	Bucks
Warren	Bradford
Warren	Franklin
Warrington	Bucks
Warrington	York
Warriors Mark	Huntingdon
Warsaw	Jefferson
Warwick	Bucks
Warwick	Chester
Warwick	Lancaster
Washington	Armstrong
Washington	Berks
Washington	Butler
Washington	Cambria
Washington	Clarion
Washington	Dauphin
Washington	Erie
Washington	Fayette
Washington	Franklin
Washington	Greene
Washington	Indiana
Washington	Jefferson
Washington	Lawrence
Washington	Lehigh
Washington	Lycoming
Washington	Northampton
Washington	Northumberland
Washington	Schuylkill
Washington	Snyder
Washington	Westmoreland
Washington	Wyoming
Washington	York
Waterford	Erie
Watson	Lycoming
Watson	Warren
Watts	Perry
Waverly	Lackawanna
Wayne	Armstrong
Wayne	Clinton
Wayne	Crawford
Wayne	Dauphin
Wayne	Erie
Wayne	Greene
Wayne	Lawrence
Wayne	Mifflin
Wayne	Schuylkill
Weisenberg	Lehigh
Wells	Bradford
Wells	Fulton
West Abington	Lackawanna
West Beaver	Snyder
West Bethlehem	Washington
West Bradford	Chester
West Branch	Potter
West Brandywine	Chester
West Brunswick	Schuylkill
West Buffalo	Union
West Burlington	Bradford
West Caln	Chester
West Cameron	Northumberland
West Carroll	Cambria
West Chillisquaque	Northumberland
West Cocalico	Lancaster
West Cornwall	Lebanon
West Deer	Allegheny
West Donegal	Lancaster
West Earl	Lancaster
West Fallowfield	Chester
West Fallowfield	Crawford
West Finley	Washington
West Franklin	Armstrong
West Goshen	Chester
West Hanover	Dauphin
West Hemlock	Montour
West Hempfield	Lancaster
West Keating	Clinton
West Lampeter	Lancaster
West Lebanon	Lebanon
West Mahanoy	Schuylkill
West Mahoning	Indiana
West Manchester	York
West Manheim	York
West Marlborough	Chester
West Mead	Crawford
West Nantmeal	Chester
West Norriton	Montgomery
West Nottingham	Chester
West Penn	Schuylkill
West Pennsboro	Cumberland
West Perry	Snyder
West Pike Run	Washington
West Pikeland	Chester
West Pottsgrove	Montgomery
West Providence	Bedford
West Rockhill	Bucks
West Sadsbury	Chester
West Salem	Mercer
West Shenango	Crawford
West St. Clair	Bedford
West Taylor	Cambria
West	Huntingdon
West Vincent	Chester
West Wheatfield	Indiana
West Whiteland	Chester
Westfall	Pike
Westfield	Tioga
Westtown	Chester
Wetmore	McKean
Wharton	Fayette
Wharton	Potter
Wheatfield	Perry
White Deer	Union
White	Beaver
White	Cambria
White	Indiana
Whitehall	Lehigh
Whiteley	Greene
Whitemarsh	Montgomery
Whitpain	Montgomery
Wiconisco	Dauphin
Wilkes-Barre	Luzerne
Wilkins	Allegheny
Williams	Dauphin
Williams	Northampton
Willistown	Chester
Wilmington	Lawrence
Wilmington	Mercer
Wilmot	Bradford
Windham	Bradford
Windham	Wyoming
Windsor	Berks
Windsor	York
Winfield	Butler
Winslow	Jefferson
Wolf Creek	Mercer
Wolf	Lycoming
Wood	Huntingdon
Woodbury	Bedford
Woodbury	Blair
Woodcock	Crawford
Woodward	Clearfield
Woodward	Clinton
Woodward	Lycoming
Worcester	Montgomery
Worth	Butler
Worth	Centre
Worth	Mercer
Wright	Luzerne
Wrightstown	Bucks
Wyalusing	Bradford
Wysox	Bradford
York	York
Young	Indiana
Young	Jefferson
Zerbe	Northumberland
None; see Act of Consolidation	Philadelphia

== See also ==
- List of municipalities in Pennsylvania
- List of cities in Pennsylvania
- List of counties in Pennsylvania
- List of Pennsylvania municipalities and counties with home rule charters, optional charters, or optional plans
- List of towns and boroughs in Pennsylvania
