= Oswayo Valley High School =

School in Shinglehouse, Pennsylvania, United States

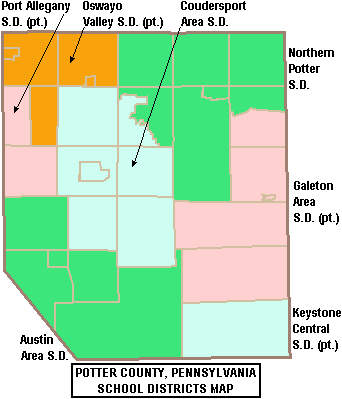

Location
- 318 Oswayo Street; Shinglehouse, Potter County and McKean County, Pennsylvania 16748; United States; 41.9594°N 78.1843°W

Information
- Type: Public
- Principal: Mr. Douglas Dickerson, MS/HS
- Teaching staff: 18.36 (FTE)
- Grades: 9th-12th
- Enrollment: 190 (2023–2024)
- Student to teacher ratio: 10.35
- Language: English
- Color: Green / White
- Website: http://oswayovalley.com/wordpress/

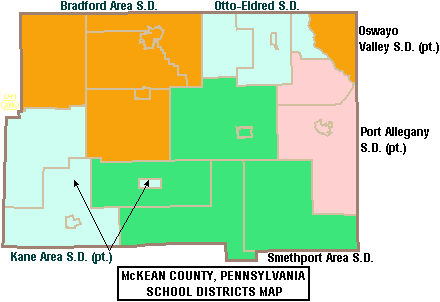
Map of McKean County, Pennsylvania School Districts

Oswayo Valley High School is a tiny, rural public high school located at 318 Oswayo Street, Shinglehouse, Potter County, Pennsylvania. In the 2018–2019 school year, its enrollment was reported as 165 pupils, in 9th through 12th grades. The school serves the boroughs of Oswayo and Shinglehouse, as well as Clara Township, Sharon Township, and Oswayo Township. McKean County's Ceres Township is also within district's service boundaries.

Oswayo Valley High School students may choose to attend Seneca Highlands Career and Technical Center for training in the construction and mechanical trades. The Seneca Highlands Intermediate Unit IU9 provides the district with a wide variety of services like specialized education for disabled students and hearing, speech and visual disability services and professional development for staff and faculty. The school is the sole high school operated by the Oswayo Valley School District.

== Extracurriculars ==
Oswayo Valley offers a wide variety of clubs, activities and sports.

=== Sports ===
The district funds:

Boys

- Baseball - A
- Basketball - A
- Cross country - AA
- Golf - AA
- Track and field - AA
- Wrestling - AA

Girls

- Basketball - A
- Cross country - A
- Golf - AA
- Softball - A
- Track and field - AA
- Volleyball

Middle school sports

Boys

- Basketball
- Cross country
- Track and field
- Wrestling

Girls

- Basketball
- Cross country
- Track and field
- Volleyball

According to PIAA directory July 2012
