= Oswayo Valley School District =

School district in Pennsylvania

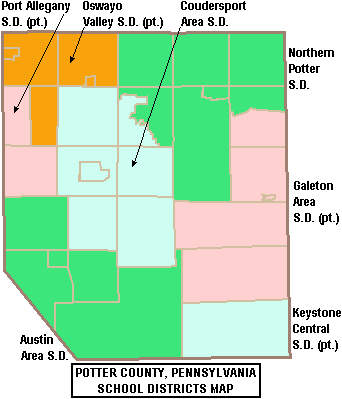

Address
- PO Box 610 Shinglehouse, Potter County and McKean County, Pennsylvania, 16748; United States

District information
- Type: Public

Other information
- Website: oswayovalley.com/wordpress/

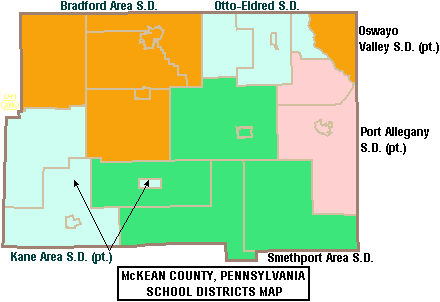
Map of McKean County, Pennsylvania School Districts

The Oswayo Valley School District is a small, rural public school district serving portions of Potter County and McKean County. Oswayo Valley School District encompasses approximately 125 square miles (320 km^{2}). The school serves the boroughs of Oswayo and Shinglehouse, as well as Clara Township, Sharon Township, and Oswayo Township. A portion of McKean County's Ceres Township is also within district boundaries. According to 2000 federal census data, it served a resident population of 3,738. In 2010 the population had declined to 3,305. The educational attainment levels for the school district population (25 years old and over) were 87% high school graduates and 9% college graduates.

According to the Pennsylvania Budget and Policy Center, 54.9% of the district's pupils lived at 185% or below the Federal Poverty level as shown by their eligibility for the federal free or reduced price school meal programs in 2012. In 2009, the district residents' per capita income was $13,984, while the median family income was $37,340. In Potter County, the median household income was $39,196. In the Commonwealth, the median family income was $49,501 and the United States median family income was $49,445, in 2010.

Oswayo Valley School District operates an elementary school (PreK - 5), middle school (6-8) and high school (9-12). High school students may choose to attend Seneca Highlands Career and Technical Center for training in the construction and mechanical trades. The Seneca Highlands Intermediate Unit IU9 provides the district with a wide variety of services like specialized education for disabled students and hearing, speech and visual disability services and professional development for staff and faculty. The district is one of the 500 public school districts of Pennsylvania.

== Extracurriculars ==
The district offers a wide variety of clubs, activities and sports.

=== Sports ===
The district funds:

Boys

- Baseball - A
- Basketball- A
- Cross country - AA
- Golf - AA
- Track and field - AA
- Wrestling - AA

Girls

- Basketball - A
- Cross country - A
- Golf - AA
- Softball - A
- Track and field - AA
- Volleyball

Middle school sports

Boys

- Basketball
- Cross country
- Track and field
- Wrestling

Girls

- Basketball
- Cross country
- Track and field
- Volleyball

According to PIAA directory July 2012
