= Clara Township =

Clara Township may refer to the following townships

in the United States:

- Clara Township, Potter County, Pennsylvania

in Canada:

- Clara Township, Ontario
