= Hebron Township, Potter County, Pennsylvania =

Township in Pennsylvania, US

Coordinates: 41°50′00″N 78°01′59″W

Hebron Township, Pennsylvania
- Township
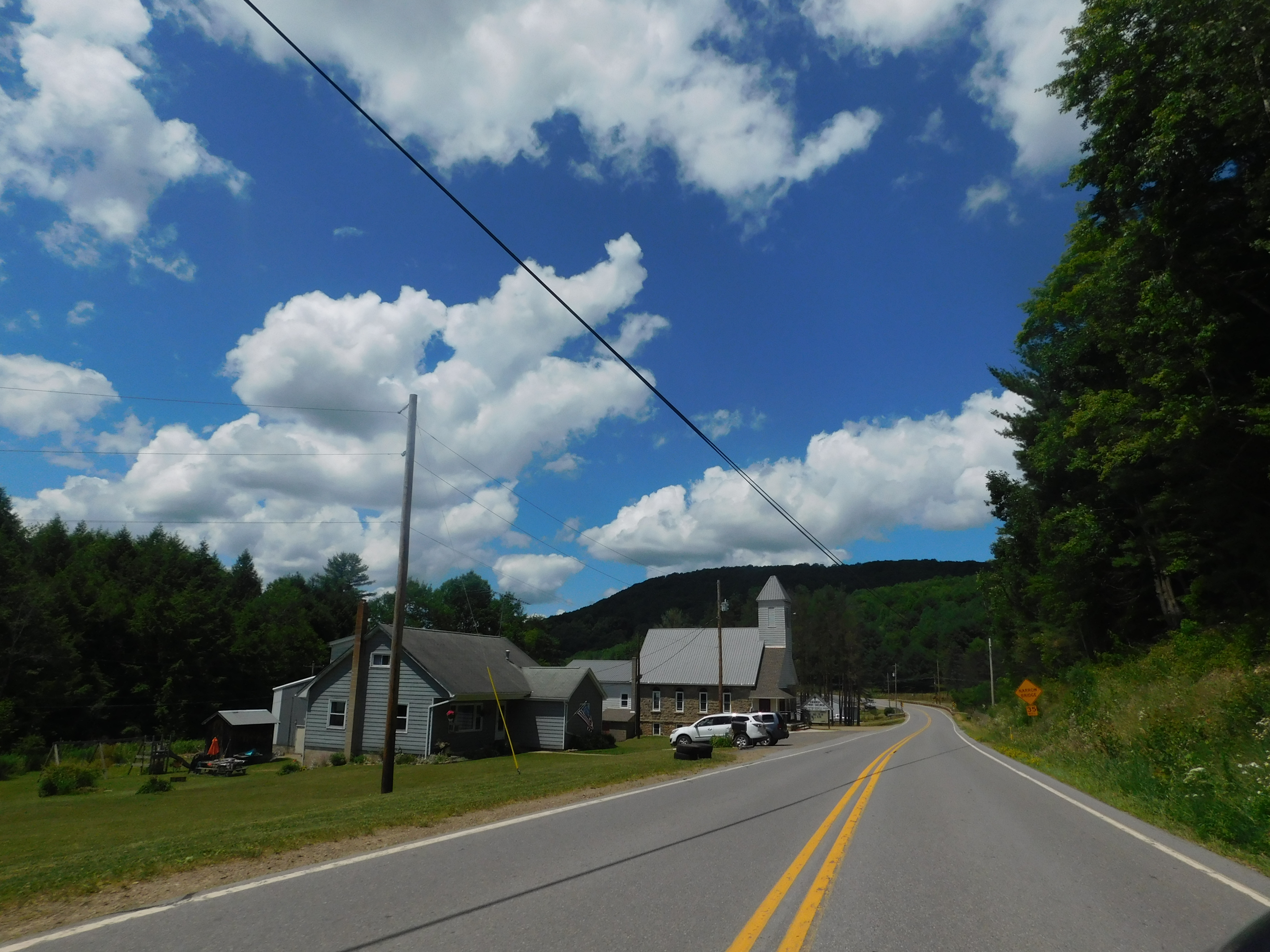
- PA 44 in Hebron Center

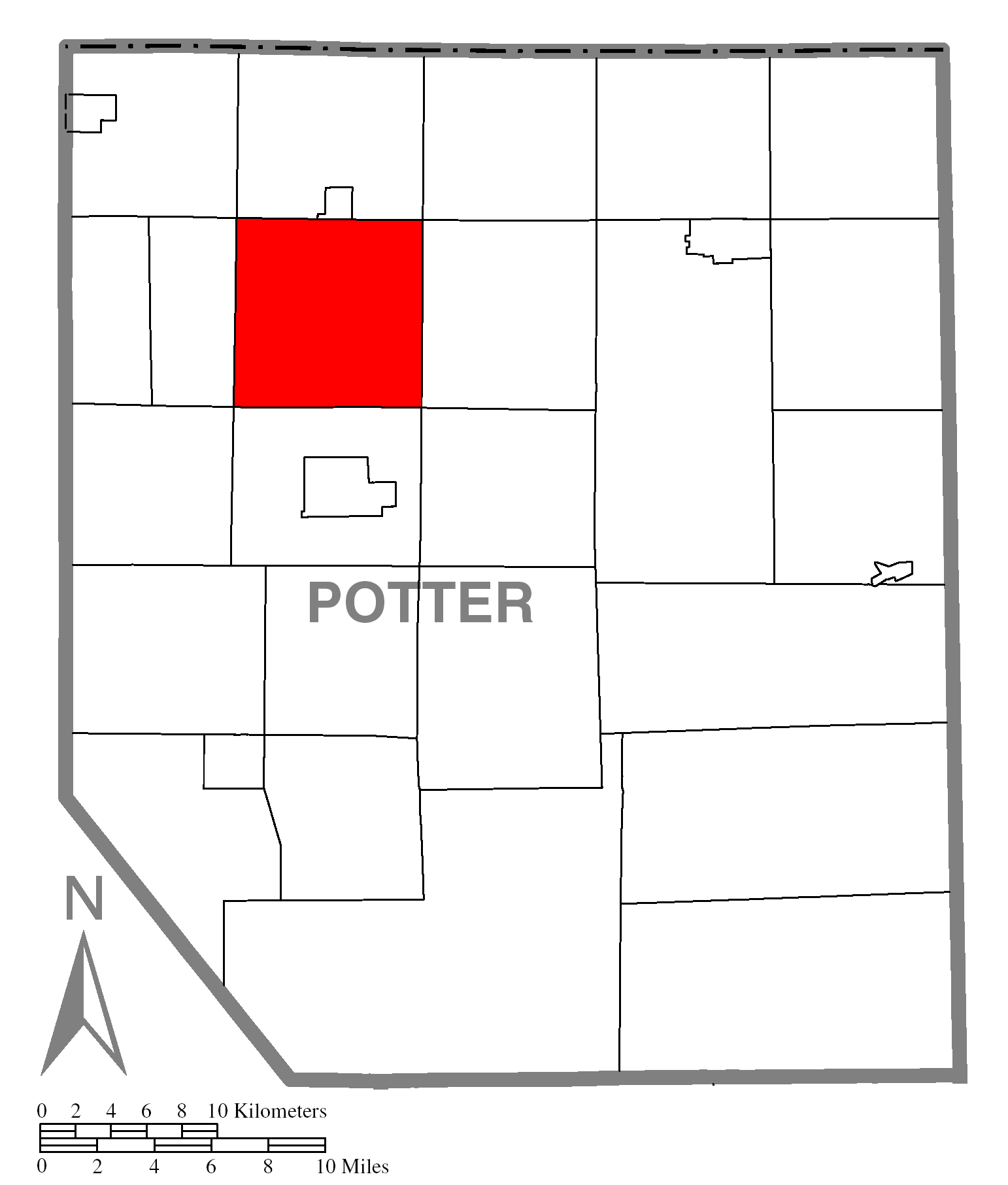
- Map of Potter County, Pennsylvania highlighting Hebron Township

- Map of Potter County, Pennsylvania
- Country: United States
- State: Pennsylvania
- County: Potter
- Settled: 1828
- Incorporated: 1828

Area
  - Total: 43.75 sq mi (113.30 km^{2})
  - Land: 43.74 sq mi (113.29 km^{2})
  - Water: 0 sq mi (0.00 km^{2})

Population (2020)
  - Total: 593 ▲
  - Estimate (2021): 587
  - Density: 13.2/sq mi (5.08/km^{2})
- Time zone: UTC-5 (EST)
  - Summer (DST): UTC-4 (EDT)
- FIPS code: 42-105-33512

Hebron Township is a township in Potter County, Pennsylvania, United States. The population was 593 at the 2020 census.

== Geography ==
According to the United States Census Bureau, the township has a total area of 43.3 square miles (112 km^{2}), all land.

Hebron Township is bordered by Oswayo Township and the borough of Oswayo to the north, Allegany Township to the east, Eulalia Township to the south and Clara Township to the west.

== Demographics ==
Historical population
Census	Pop.	Note	%±
2000	622		—
2010	589		−5.3%
2020	593		0.7%
2021 (est.)	587		−1.0%
U.S. Decennial Census

As of the census of 2000, there were 622 people, 238 households, and 189 families residing in the township. The population density was 14.4 people per square mile (5.6/km^{2}). There were 399 housing units at an average density of 9.2/sq mi (3.6/km^{2}). The racial makeup of the township was 96.46% White, 0.16% African American, 0.32% Native American, 0.16% Asian, and 2.89% from two or more races. Hispanic or Latino of any race were 0.32% of the population.

There were 238 households, out of which 34.0% had children under the age of 18 living with them, 67.6% were married couples living together, 5.0% had a female householder with no husband present, and 20.2% were non-families. 17.2% of all households were made up of individuals, and 8.4% had someone living alone who was 65 years of age or older. The average household size was 2.61 and the average family size was 2.93.

In the township the population was spread out, with 24.8% under the age of 18, 7.2% from 18 to 24, 24.4% from 25 to 44, 27.7% from 45 to 64, and 15.9% who were 65 years of age or older. The median age was 40 years. For every 100 females, there were 113.7 males. For every 100 females age 18 and over, there were 112.7 males.

The median income for a household in the township was $43,229, and the median income for a family was $45,556. Males had a median income of $35,417 versus $25,714 for females. The per capita income for the township was $20,101. About 3.9% of families and 6.2% of the population were below the poverty line, including 3.2% of those under age 18 and 7.9% of those age 65 or over.
