= Sharon Township, Pennsylvania =

Township in Pennsylvania, US

Coordinates: 41°57′00″N 78°09′59″W

- Township
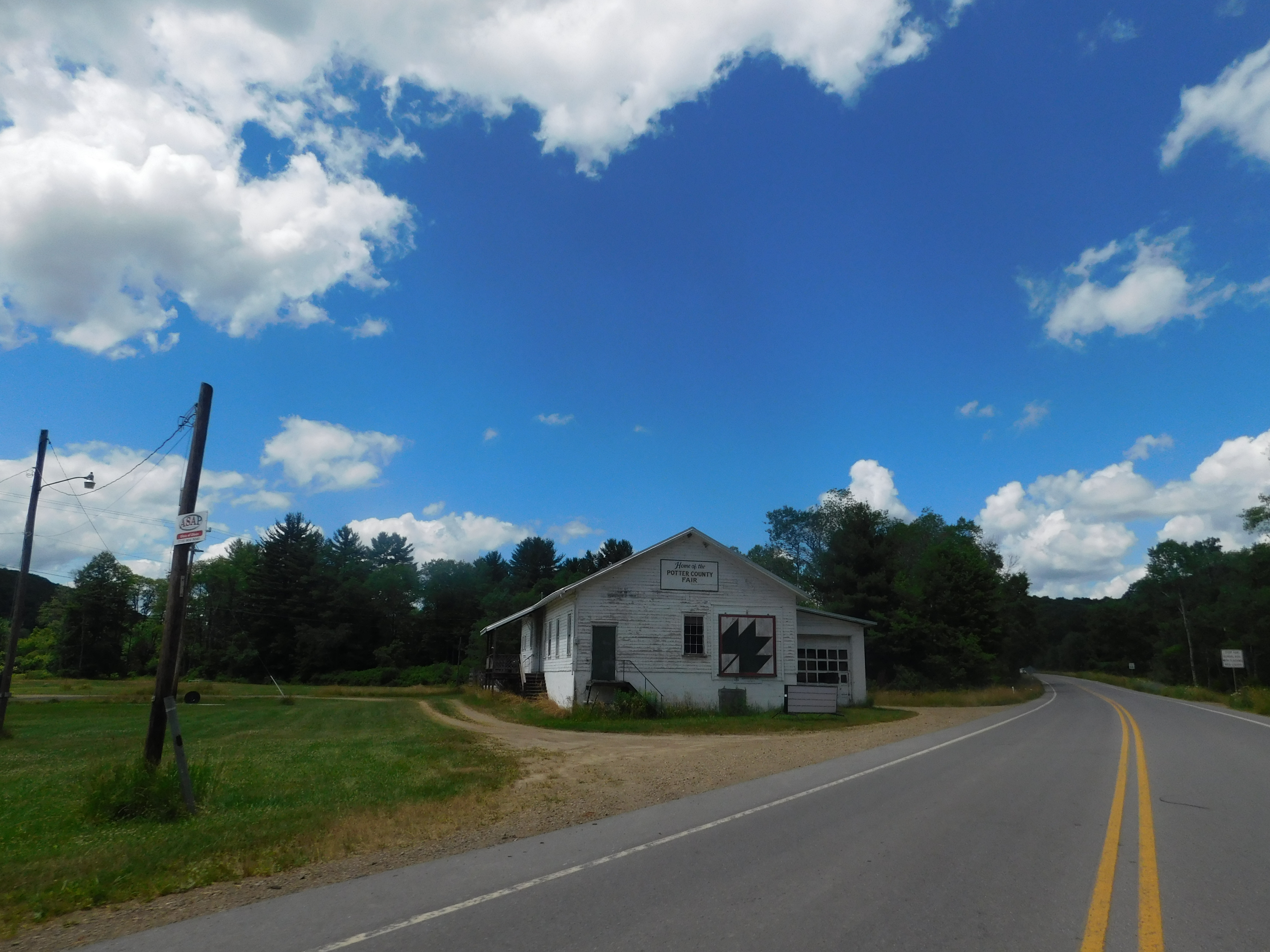
- Potter County Fairgrounds in the Sharon Township village of Millport

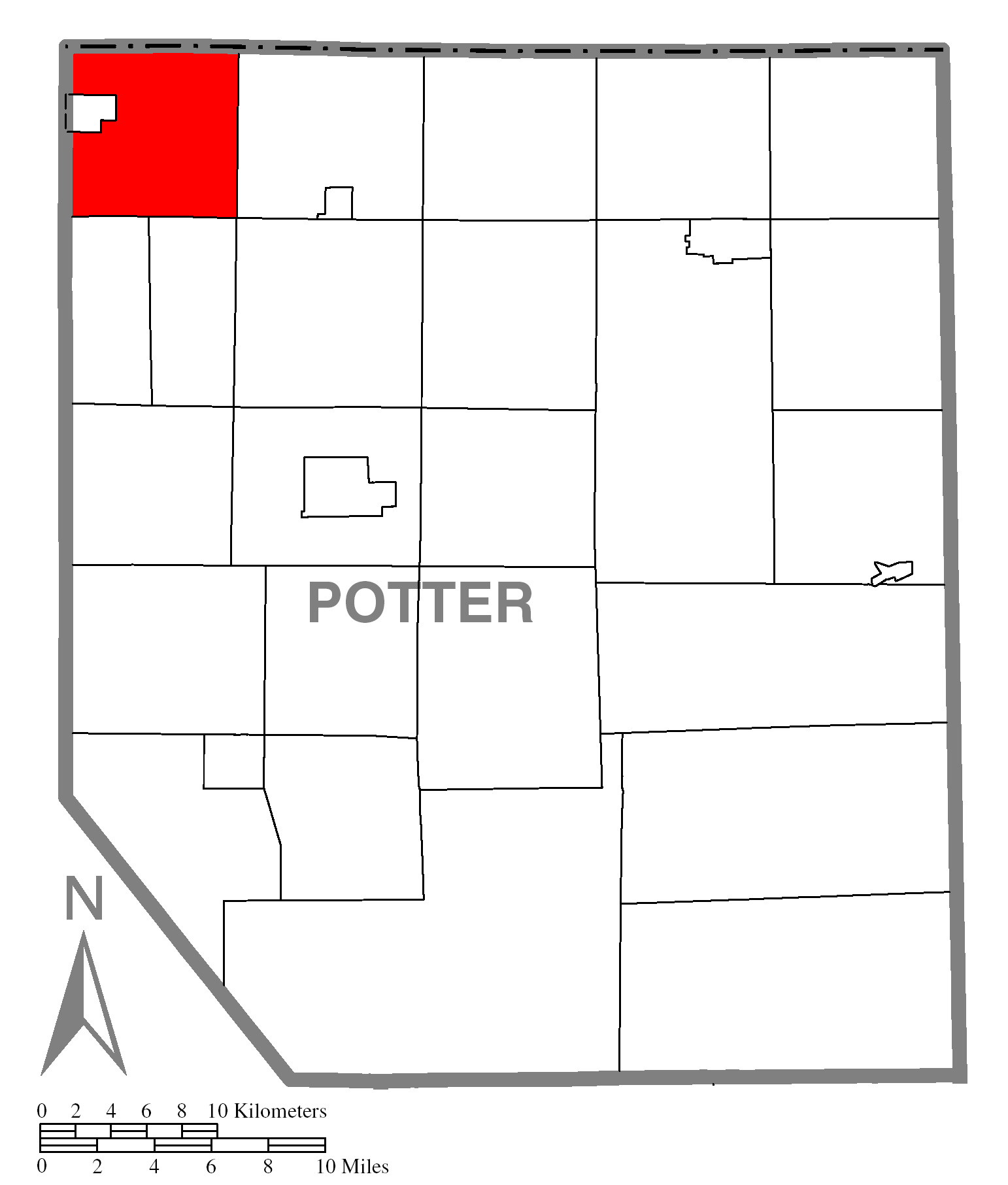
- Map of Potter County, Pennsylvania highlighting Sharon Township

- Map of Potter County, Pennsylvania
- Country: United States
- State: Pennsylvania
- County: Potter
- Settled: 1827
- Incorporated: 1828

Area
  - Total: 34.07 sq mi (88.23 km^{2})
  - Land: 34.04 sq mi (88.16 km^{2})
  - Water: 0.027 sq mi (0.07 km^{2})

Population (2020)
  - Total: 789 ▼
  - Estimate (2021): 782
  - Density: 24.7/sq mi (9.55/km^{2})
- Time zone: UTC-5 (EST)
  - Summer (DST): UTC-4 (EDT)
- ZIP code: 16748
- Area code: 814
- FIPS code: 42-105-69736

Sharon Township is a township in Potter County, Pennsylvania, United States. The population was 789 at the 2020 census.

== Geography ==
According to the United States Census Bureau, the township has a total area of 34.0 square miles (88.1 km^{2}), of which 34.0 square miles (88.0 km^{2}) is land and 0.03% is water.

Sharon Township is bordered by New York to the north, Oswayo Township to the east, Clara and Pleasant Valley Townships to the south and McKean County to the west.

The borough of Shinglehouse is in the western part of the township, near the McKean County line.

== History ==
When Potter County was created on December 5, 1810, the whole county was in one township, Eulalia Township, Pennsylvania.

The next division leading to Sharon Township was the organization of Roulette Township, on January 29, 1816. It included the present area of Sharon, as well as current Roulette Township, Pleasant Valley Township and Clara Township.

Finally, on February 26, 1828, Sharon (and Clara Township) was created out of Roulette Township.

== Demographics ==
Historical population
| Census | Pop. | Note | %± |
|---|---|---|---|
| 2000 | 907 | | — |
| 2010 | 866 | | −4.5% |
| 2020 | 789 | | −8.9% |
| 2021 (est.) | 782 | | −0.9% |
U.S. Decennial Census

As of the census of 2000, there were 907 people, 335 households, and 256 families residing in the township. The population density was 26.7 inhabitants per square mile (10.3/km^{2}). There were 471 housing units at an average density of 13.9/sq mi (5.4/km^{2}). The racial makeup of the township was 99.12% White, 0.22% African American, 0.33% Asian, 0.22% Pacific Islander, 0.11% from other races. Hispanic or Latino of any race were 0.33% of the population.

There were 335 households, out of which 31.9% had children under the age of 18 living with them, 69.0% were married couples living together, 4.2% had a female householder with no husband present, and 23.3% were non-families. 19.7% of all households were made up of individuals, and 8.4% had someone living alone who was 65 years of age or older. The average household size was 2.71 and the average family size was 3.13.

In the township the population was spread out, with 26.0% under the age of 18, 5.5% from 18 to 24, 26.6% from 25 to 44, 27.2% from 45 to 64, and 14.7% who were 65 years of age or older. The median age was 40 years. For every 100 females, there were 101.1 males. For every 100 females age 18 and over, there were 96.2 males.

The median income for a household in the township was $34,063, and the median income for a family was $38,661. Males had a median income of $30,500 versus $22,031 for females. The per capita income for the township was $15,570. About 8.8% of families and 11.7% of the population were below the poverty line, including 17.7% of those under age 18 and 12.5% of those age 65 or over.
