= William C. Davis Jr. =

American ballistics engineer (1921–2010)

- Born: 1921
- Died: 4 March 2010 (aged 88–89)
- Occupations: Soldier, engineer, and author

William C. Davis Jr. (1921–2010) was an American ballistics engineer, best remembered as a writer and editor on ballistics for American Rifleman magazine.

== Early life ==
After graduating from Shinglehouse High School in 1937, Davis received a degree in physics and mathematics from Saint Bonaventure University in 1941. He joined the United States Army in 1942, was a qualified expert with rifle, pistol, and carbine, and served through World War II advancing to the rank of captain.

== Engineer ==
He became a civilian ordnance engineer in 1951, and worked at Aberdeen Proving Grounds, Frankford Arsenal, and Rock Island Arsenal. He was the United States representative for the Perdine trials of 1953 leading to the adoption of the 7.62×51mm as the standard NATO military cartridge. He subsequently assisted in the development of the 5.56×45mm cartridge and M16 rifle before retiring from federal employment in 1972. Davis founded Tioga Engineering Company in 1980.

== Author ==
Davis' first article for the American Rifleman was published in 1949. He became a contributing editor to the publication in 1974 and was named ballistics editor in 1986. He wrote the "Ammunition" section of Encyclopædia Britannica and published 14 computer ballistics programs.
