= Pleasant Valley Township, Pennsylvania =

Township in Pennsylvania, US

Coordinates: 41°51′00″N 78°09′59″W

- Township
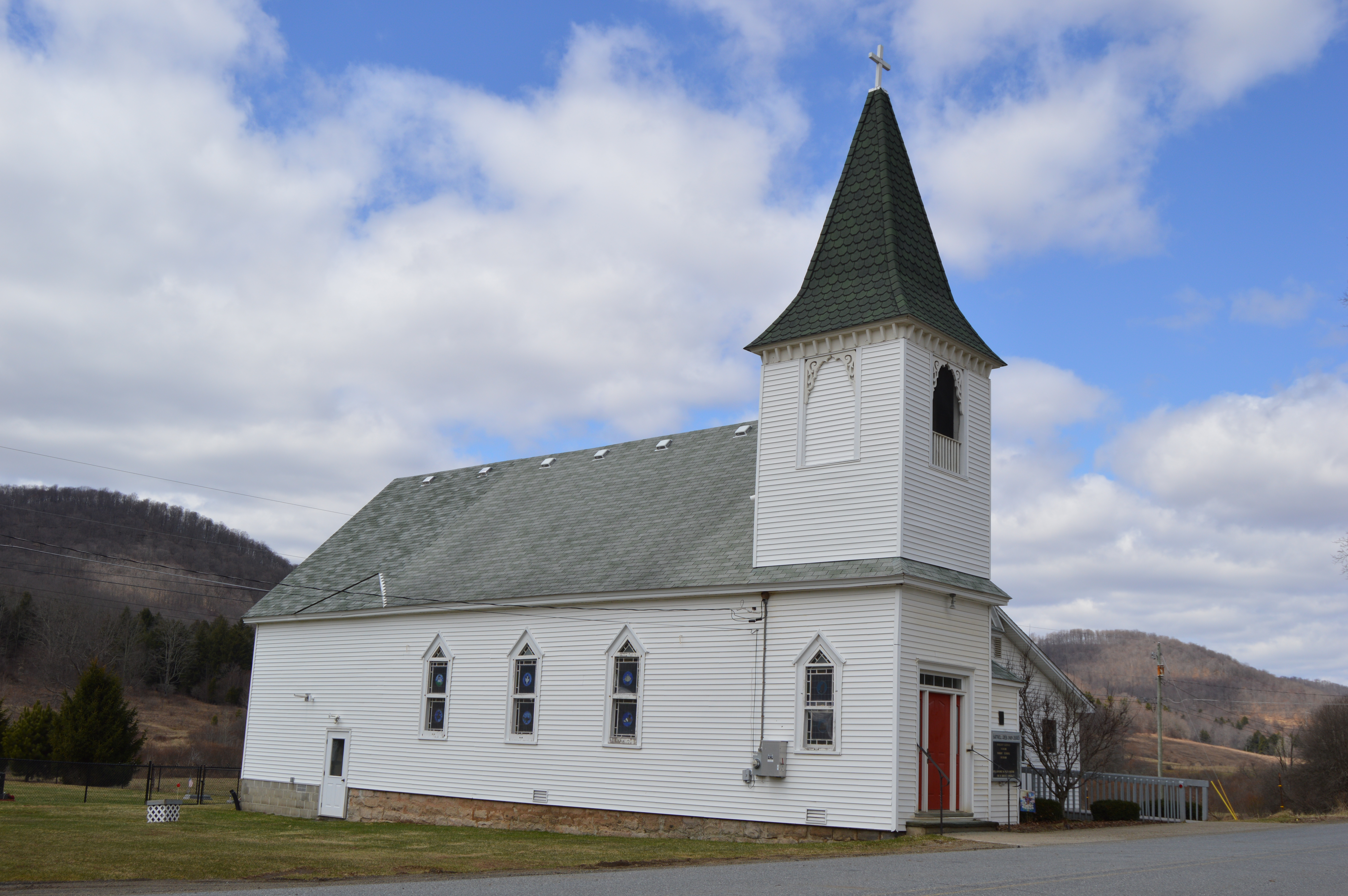
- Sartwell Creek Union Church

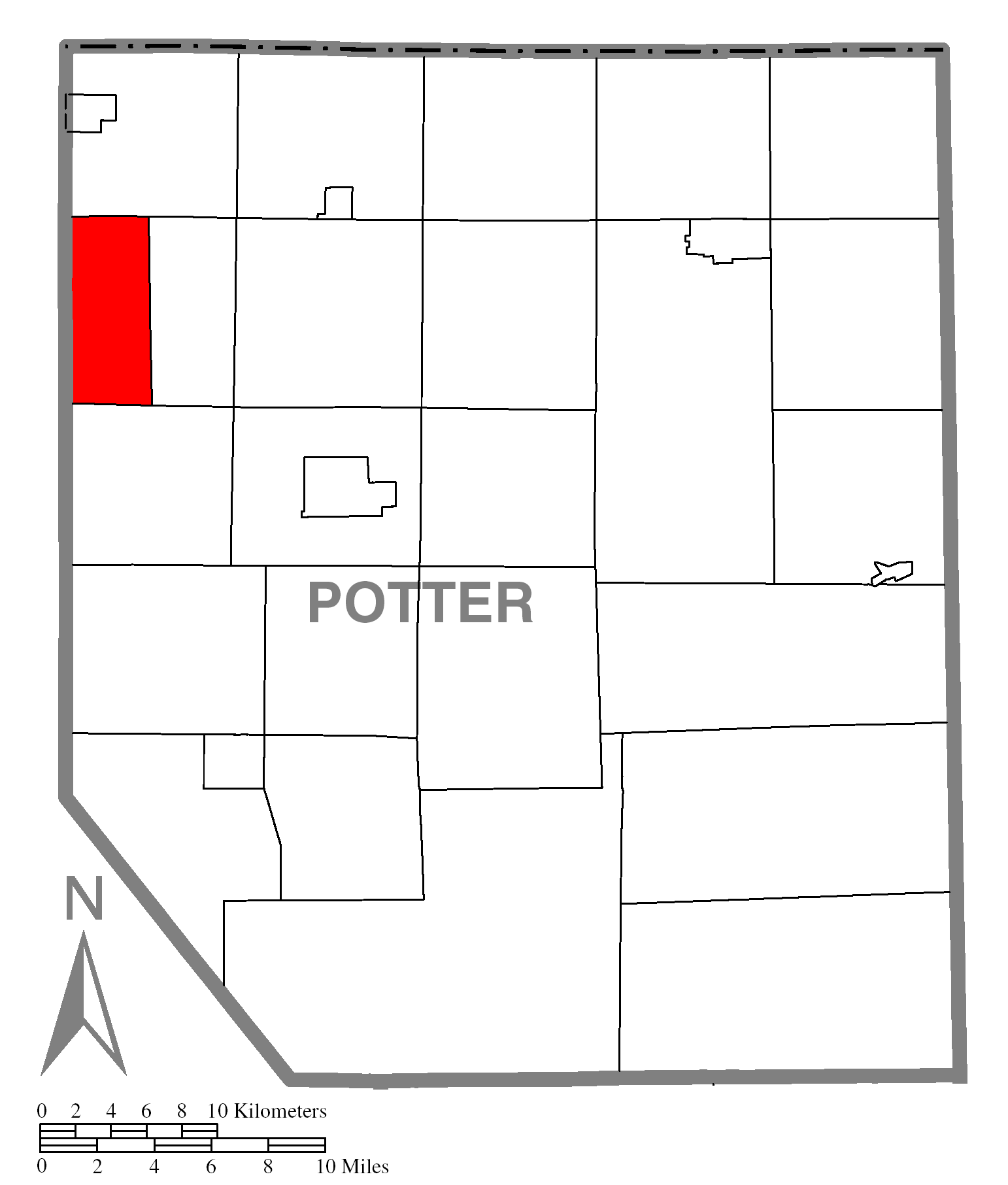
- Map of Potter County, Pennsylvania highlighting Pleasant Valley Township

- Map of Potter County, Pennsylvania
- Country: United States
- State: Pennsylvania
- County: Potter
- Settled: 1841
- Incorporated: 1847

Area
  - Total: 19.62 sq mi (50.81 km^{2})
  - Land: 19.62 sq mi (50.81 km^{2})
  - Water: 0 sq mi (0.00 km^{2})

Population (2020)
  - Total: 76 ▼
  - Estimate (2021): 75
  - Density: 4.3/sq mi (1.65/km^{2})
- Time zone: UTC-5 (Eastern (EST))
  - Summer (DST): UTC-4 (EDT)
- Area code: 814
- FIPS code: 42-105-61400

Pleasant Valley Township is a township in Potter County, Pennsylvania, United States. The population was 76 at the 2020 census.

== Geography ==
According to the United States Census Bureau, the township has a total area of 19.6 square miles (50.8 km^{2}), all land.

Pleasant Valley Township is bordered by Sharon Township to the north, Clara Township to the east, Roulette Township to the south and McKean County to the west.

== Demographics ==
Historical population
| Census | Pop. | Note | %± |
|---|---|---|---|
| 2000 | 80 | | — |
| 2010 | 86 | | 7.5% |
| 2020 | 76 | | −11.6% |
| 2021 (est.) | 75 | | −1.3% |
U.S. Decennial Census

As of the census of 2000, there were 80 people, 32 households, and 20 families residing in the township. The population density was 4.1 people per square mile (1.6/km^{2}). There were 84 housing units at an average density of 4.3/sq mi (1.7/km^{2}). The racial makeup of the township was 100.00% White. Hispanic or Latino of any race were 3.75% of the population.

There were 32 households, out of which 28.1% had children under the age of 18 living with them, 59.4% were married couples living together, 6.3% had a female householder with no husband present, and 34.4% were non-families. 15.6% of all households were made up of individuals, and 6.3% had someone living alone who was 65 years of age or older. The average household size was 2.50 and the average family size was 2.90.

In the township the population was spread out, with 23.8% under the age of 18, 7.5% from 18 to 24, 26.3% from 25 to 44, 28.8% from 45 to 64, and 13.8% who were 65 years of age or older. The median age was 40 years. For every 100 females there were 116.2 males. For every 100 females age 18 and over, there were 84.8 males.

The median income for a household in the township was $50,208, and the median income for a family was $46,250. Males had a median income of $38,750 versus $26,250 for females. The per capita income for the township was $18,894. There were 10.7% of families and 17.5% of the population living below the poverty line, including 25.0% of under eighteens and none of those over 64.
