= Eulalia Township, Potter County, Pennsylvania =

Township in Pennsylvania, US

Coordinates: 41°35′00″N 77°52′59″W

Eulalia Township, Pennsylvania
- Township
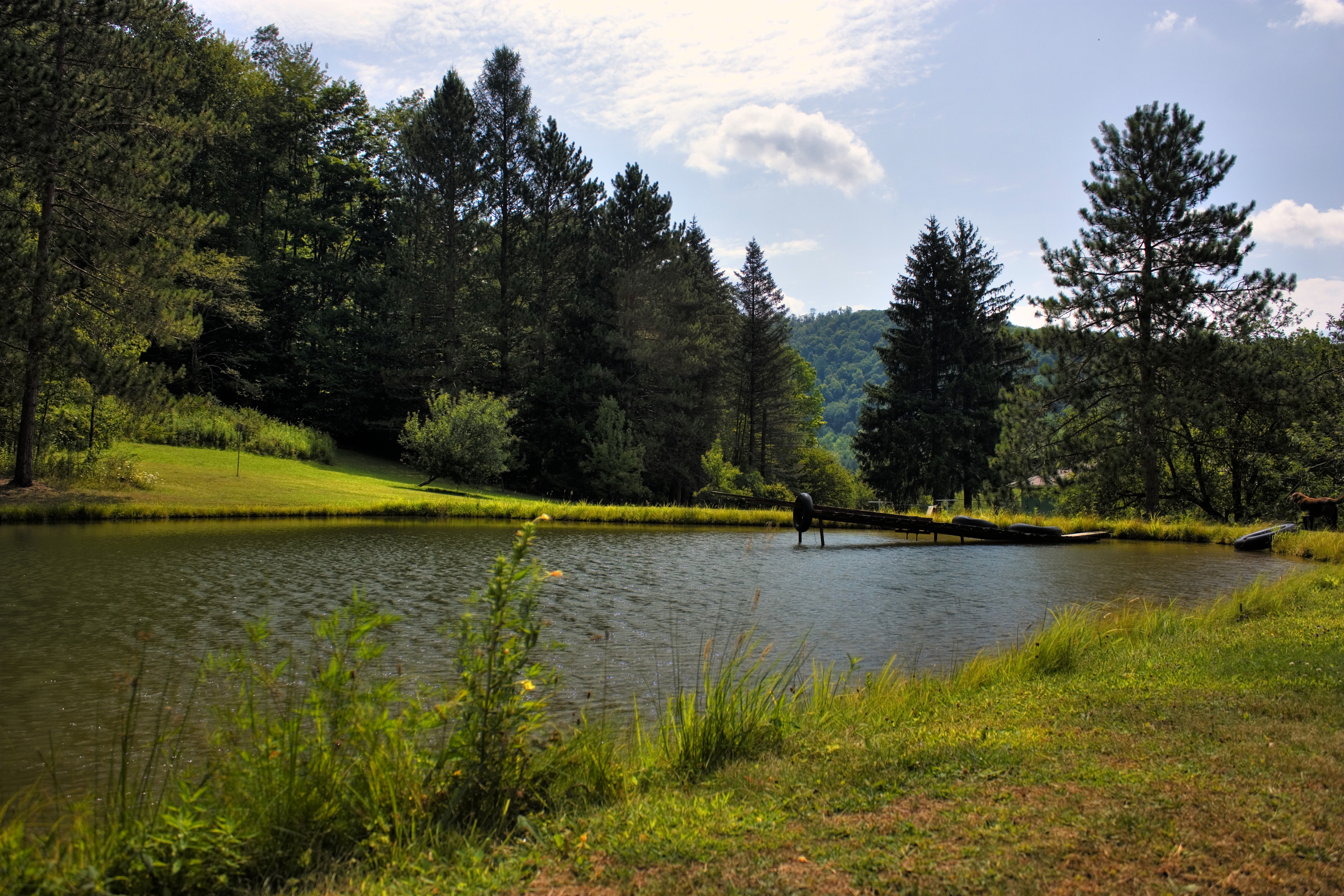
- A pond in Eulalia Township

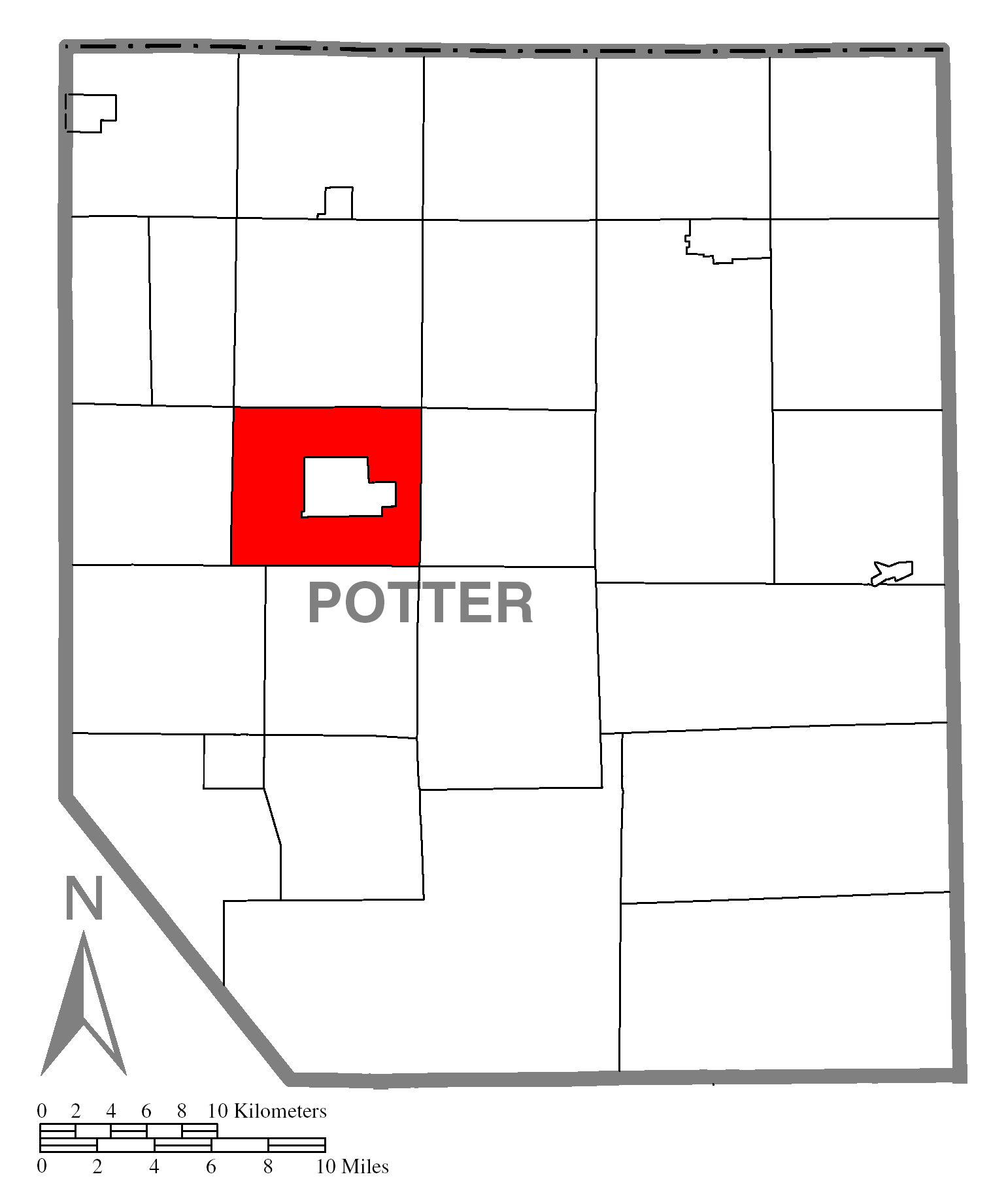
- Map of Potter County, Pennsylvania highlighting Eulalia Township

- Map of Potter County, Pennsylvania
- Country: United States
- State: Pennsylvania
- County: Potter
- Settled: 1812
- Incorporated: 1810

Area
  - Total: 31.12 sq mi (80.60 km^{2})
  - Land: 31.12 sq mi (80.60 km^{2})
  - Water: 0 sq mi (0.00 km^{2})

Population (2020)
  - Total: 873 ▼
  - Estimate (2021): 866
  - Density: 27.9/sq mi (10.79/km^{2})
- Time zone: UTC-5 (EST)
  - Summer (DST): UTC-4 (EDT)
- FIPS code: 42-105-24184

Eulalia Township is a township in Potter County, Pennsylvania, United States. The population was 873 at the 2020 census.

== Geography ==
According to the United States Census Bureau, the township has a total area of 31.1 square miles (81 km^{2}), all land.

Eulalia Township surrounds Coudersport and is bordered to the north by Hebron Township, to the east by Sweden Township, to the south by Homer Township and to the west by Roulette Township.

== History ==
Eulalia Township was the first township in Potter County. When the county was created on December 5, 1810, the whole county was placed in Eulalia Township.

The township was named after the wife of one John Keating, a land agent who led the first people to settle in Potter County. His wife was named Eulalia Deschapelles; therefore, the township took her forename. Another source asserts Eulalia was the name of the first white child born there.

== Demographics ==
Historical population
Census	Pop.	Note	%±
2000	941		—
2010	889		−5.5%
2020	873		−1.8%
2021 (est.)	866		−0.8%

As of the census of 2000, there were 941 people, 305 households, and 233 families residing in the township. The population density was 30.3 inhabitants per square mile (11.7/km^{2}). There were 418 housing units at an average density of 13.4/sq mi (5.2/km^{2}). The racial makeup of the township was 97.77% White, 0.53% African American, 1.06% Asian, and 0.64% from two or more races. Hispanic or Latino of any race were 0.21% of the population.

There were 305 households, out of which 34.4% had children under the age of 18 living with them, 67.5% were married couples living together, 5.6% had a female householder with no husband present, and 23.3% were non-families. 21.0% of all households were made up of individuals, and 7.5% had someone living alone who was 65 years of age or older. The average household size was 2.58 and the average family size was 3.00.

In the township the population was spread out, with 21.5% under the age of 18, 3.9% from 18 to 24, 22.2% from 25 to 44, 25.8% from 45 to 64, and 26.6% who were 65 years of age or older. The median age was 46 years. For every 100 females, there were 87.8 males. For every 100 females age 18 and over, there were 80.7 males.

The median income for a household in the township was $40,469, and the median income for a family was $52,708. Males had a median income of $45,278 versus $27,188 for females. The per capita income for the township was $27,245. About 5.5% of families and 5.8% of the population were below the poverty line, including 9.0% of those under age 18 and 4.3% of those age 65 or over.

== Coudersport Area Municipal Authority Wastewater Plant Controversy ==
In 2018, the Coudersport Area Municipal Authority (CAMA) became involved in a controversial proposal for a fracking wastewater plant. CAMA services Eulalia Township. JKLM Energy intended to truck "produced water" (fracking wastewater) to a centralized plant for treatment to be located adjacent to the CAMA plant in Eulalia Township, Pennsylvania, when and if the plant was approved and licensed by governmental authorities. The treated wastewater then would be transferred to CAMA for disposal into the headwaters of the Allegheny River.

This plant proposal was opposed by many residents of Potter County, as well as by the Seneca Nation of Indians, who reside downriver from the proposed plant location. The Pennsylvania Department of Environmental Protection fined JKLM $472,317 in 2016 for groundwater contamination caused by the use of an unapproved surfactant during the drilling of a natural gas well. The contamination impacted six private drinking water wells in Eulalia and Sweden townships, Potter County. The Cattaraugus County, New York legislature as well as New York State Senator Catharine Young have joined the Seneca Nation in opposition to the proposed fracking wastewater plant. Additionally, the Coudersport Borough (PA) Council voted to oppose the siting of the plant near Coudersport. The Coudersport Borough Council's resolution of opposition was forwarded to the Coudersport Area Municipal Authority (CAMA), who has not yet considered it in a public forum.
