= Ceres Township, Pennsylvania =

Township in Pennsylvania, United States

Coordinates: 41°57′00″N 78°13′59″W

- Township
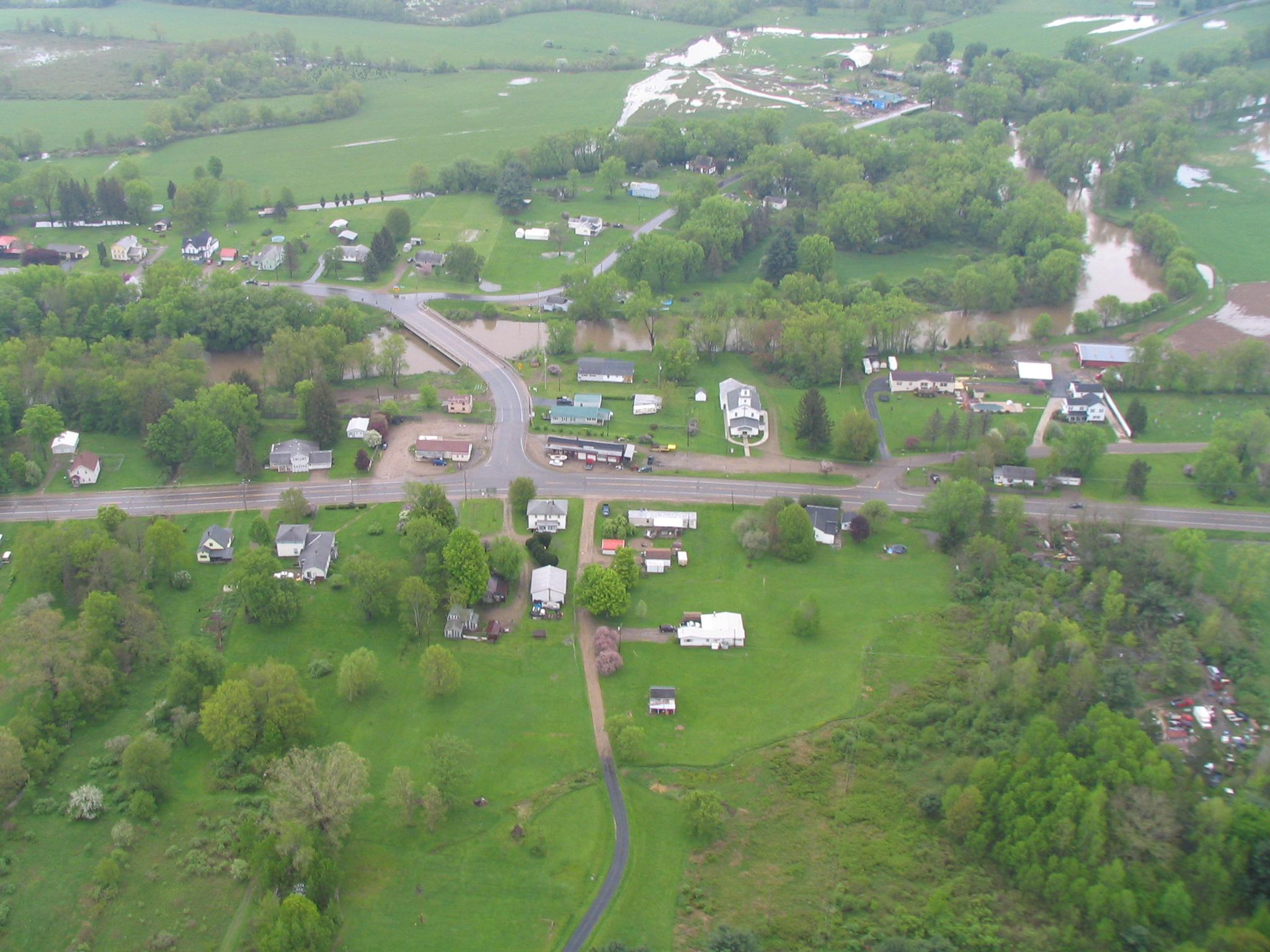
- Village of Ceres, Pennsylvania (top), south of Oswayo Creek, Ceres, New York (bottom) north of the creek

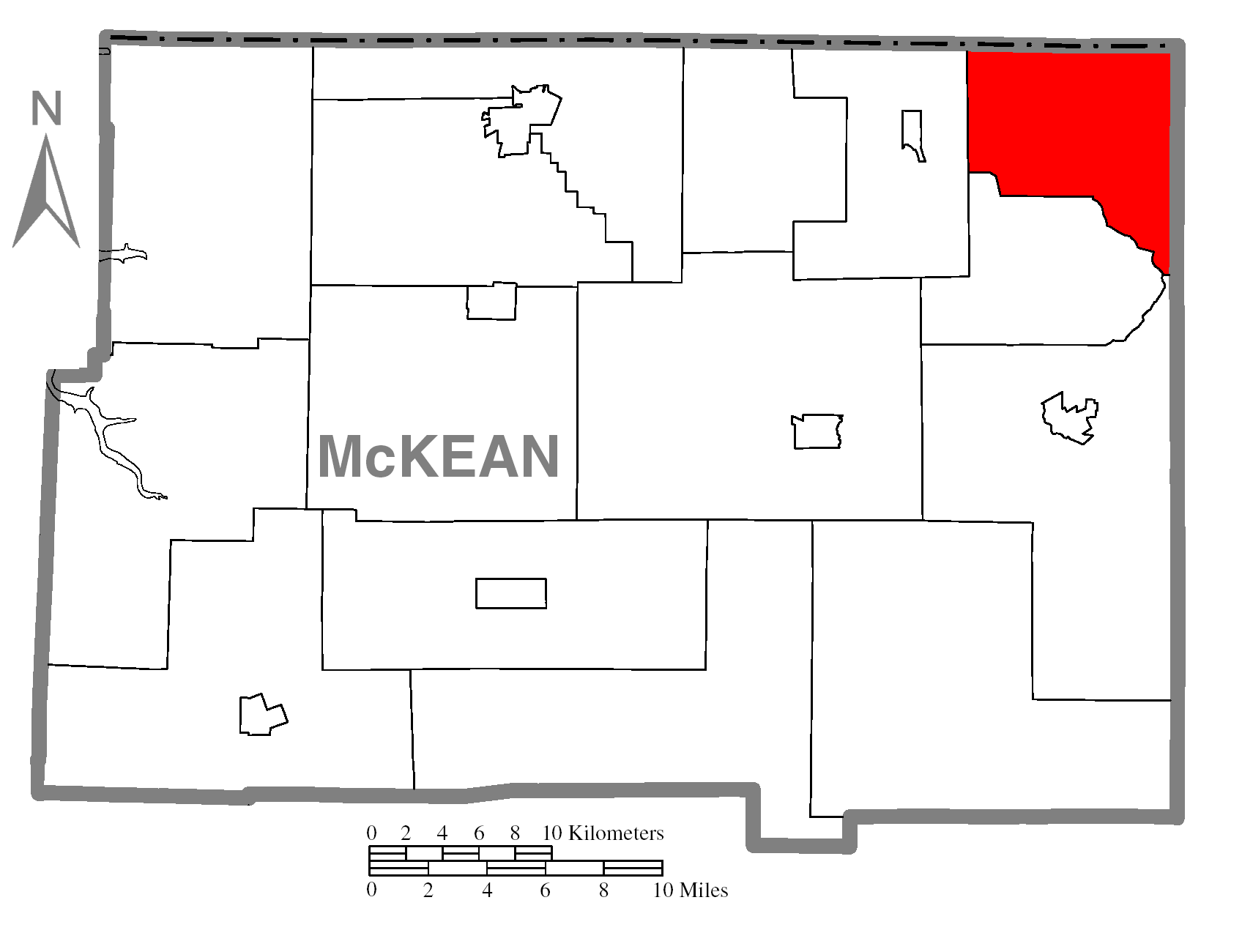
- Location in McKean County

- Location of McKean County in Pennsylvania
- Country: United States
- State: Pennsylvania
- County: McKean
- Settled: 1798
- Incorporated: 1798

Area
  - Total: 40.84 sq mi (105.77 km^{2})
  - Land: 40.67 sq mi (105.33 km^{2})
  - Water: 0.17 sq mi (0.43 km^{2})

Population (2020)
  - Total: 846 ▼
  - Estimate (2022): 822
  - Density: 20.37/sq mi (7.86/km^{2})
- Time zone: UTC-5 (Eastern (EST))
  - Summer (DST): UTC-4 (EDT)
- ZIP Codes: 16731 (Eldred); 16748 (Shinglehouse)
- Area code: 814
- FIPS code: 42-083-12408

Ceres Township is a township in McKean County, Pennsylvania, United States. The population was 846 at the 2020 census.

== Geography ==
The township is in northeastern McKean County, with the New York state line forming the township's northern border and the Potter County line forming its eastern border. Pennsylvania Route 44 crosses the northeast part of the township, passing through the hamlet of Myrtle. It proceeds northwest to the community of Ceres, which lies along the northern boundary of the township, mostly within New York.

According to the U.S. Census Bureau, Ceres Township has a total area of 40.5 square miles (104.9 km^{2}), of which 0.2 square miles (0.5 km^{2}), or 0.39%, are water. The township is drained by Oswayo Creek and its tributaries Bell Run and Kings Run. Oswayo Creek is a northwest-flowing tributary of the Allegheny River. The west side of the township is drained by direct tributaries of the Allegheny: McCrea Run, Barden Brook, and Newell Creek.

== Demographics ==
Historical population
Census	Pop.	Note	%±
2000	1,003		—
2010	905		−9.8%
2020	846		−6.5%
2022 (est.)	822		−2.8%
U.S. Decennial Census

As of the census of 2000, there were 1,003 people, 381 households, and 286 families residing in the township. The population density was 24.6 people per square mile (9.5/km^{2}). There were 475 housing units at an average density of 11.7/sq mi (4.5/km^{2}). The racial makeup of the township was 98.40% White, 0.60% Native American, and 1.00% from two or more races.

There were 381 households, out of which 30.4% had children under the age of 18 living with them, 68.0% were married couples living together, 4.7% had a female householder with no husband present, and 24.7% were non-families. 20.7% of all households were made up of individuals, and 9.7% had someone living alone who was 65 years of age or older. The average household size was 2.63 and the average family size was 3.05.

In the township the population was spread out, with 25.1% under the age of 18, 7.6% from 18 to 24, 26.9% from 25 to 44, 26.7% from 45 to 64, and 13.7% who were 65 years of age or older. The median age was 39 years. For every 100 females, there were 103.4 males. For every 100 females age 18 and over, there were 95.1 males.

The median income for a household in the township was $34,107, and the median income for a family was $41,161. Males had a median income of $31,083 versus $19,861 for females. The per capita income for the township was $13,934. About 6.6% of families and 9.9% of the population were below the poverty line, including 9.8% of those under age 18 and 3.8% of those age 65 or over.
