= Roulette Township, Pennsylvania =

Township in Pennsylvania, US

Coordinates: 41°47′00″N 78°09′59″W

- Township
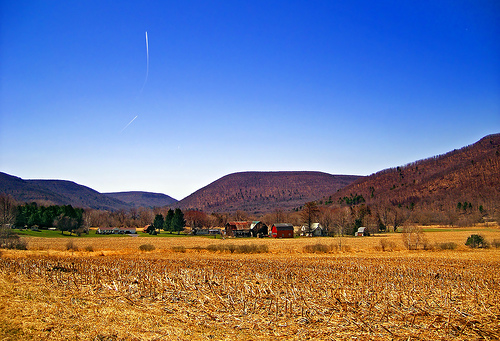
- A farm in Roulette Township

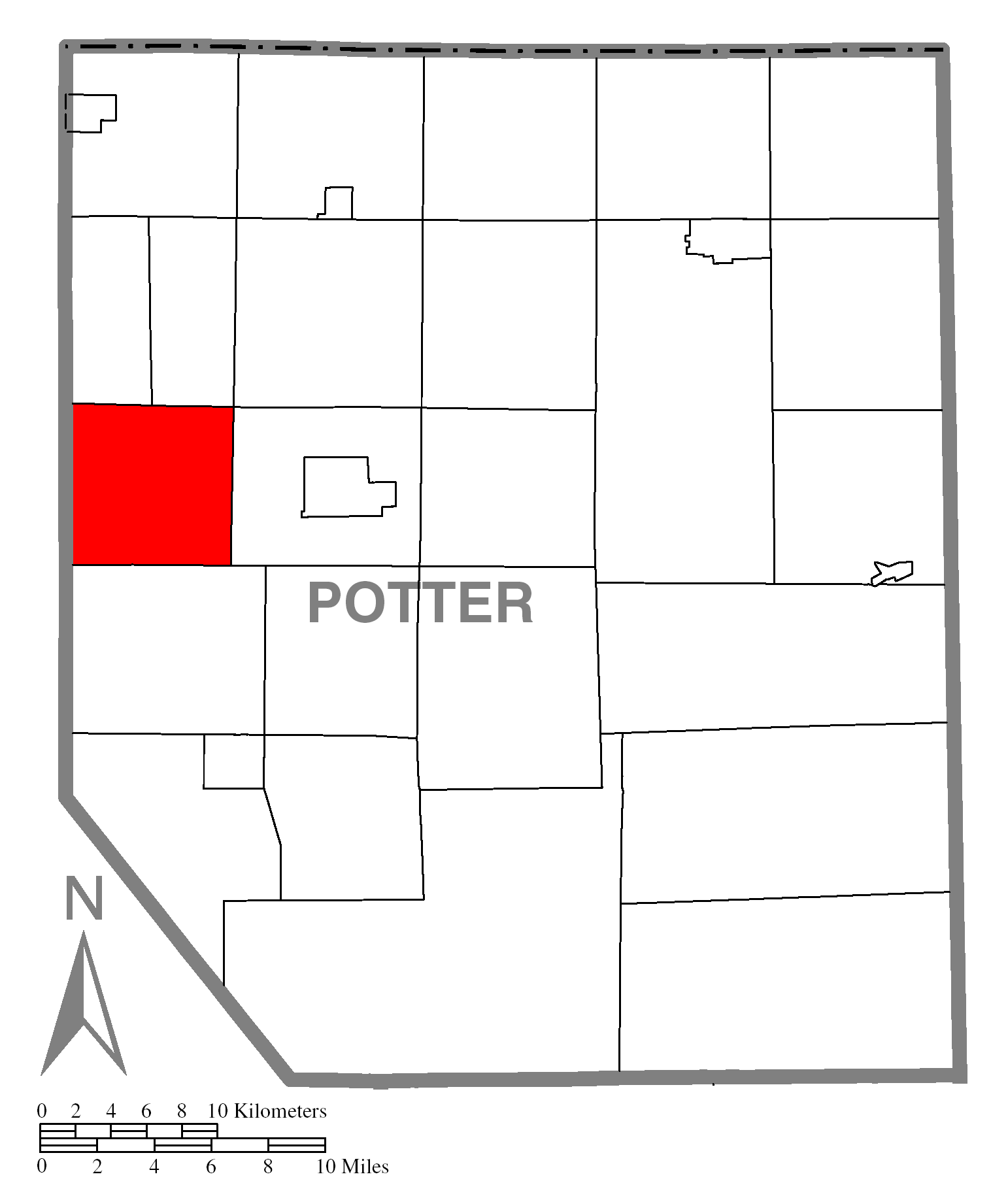
- Map of Potter County, Pennsylvania highlighting Roulette Township

- Map of Potter County, Pennsylvania
- Country: United States
- State: Pennsylvania
- County: Potter
- Settled: 1831
- Incorporated: 1816

Area
  - Total: 32.62 sq mi (84.49 km^{2})
  - Land: 32.62 sq mi (84.48 km^{2})
  - Water: 0 sq mi (0.00 km^{2})

Population (2020)
  - Total: 1,100 ▼
  - Estimate (2021): 1,088
  - Density: 35.3/sq mi (13.64/km^{2})
- Time zone: UTC-5 (Eastern (EST))
  - Summer (DST): UTC-4 (EDT)
- Area code: 814
- FIPS code: 42-105-66416
- Website: roulettetwp.com

Roulette Township is a township in Potter County, Pennsylvania, United States. The population was 1,100 at the 2020 census. The small town of Roulette, a census-designated place with a population of about 800, is located near the center of the township.

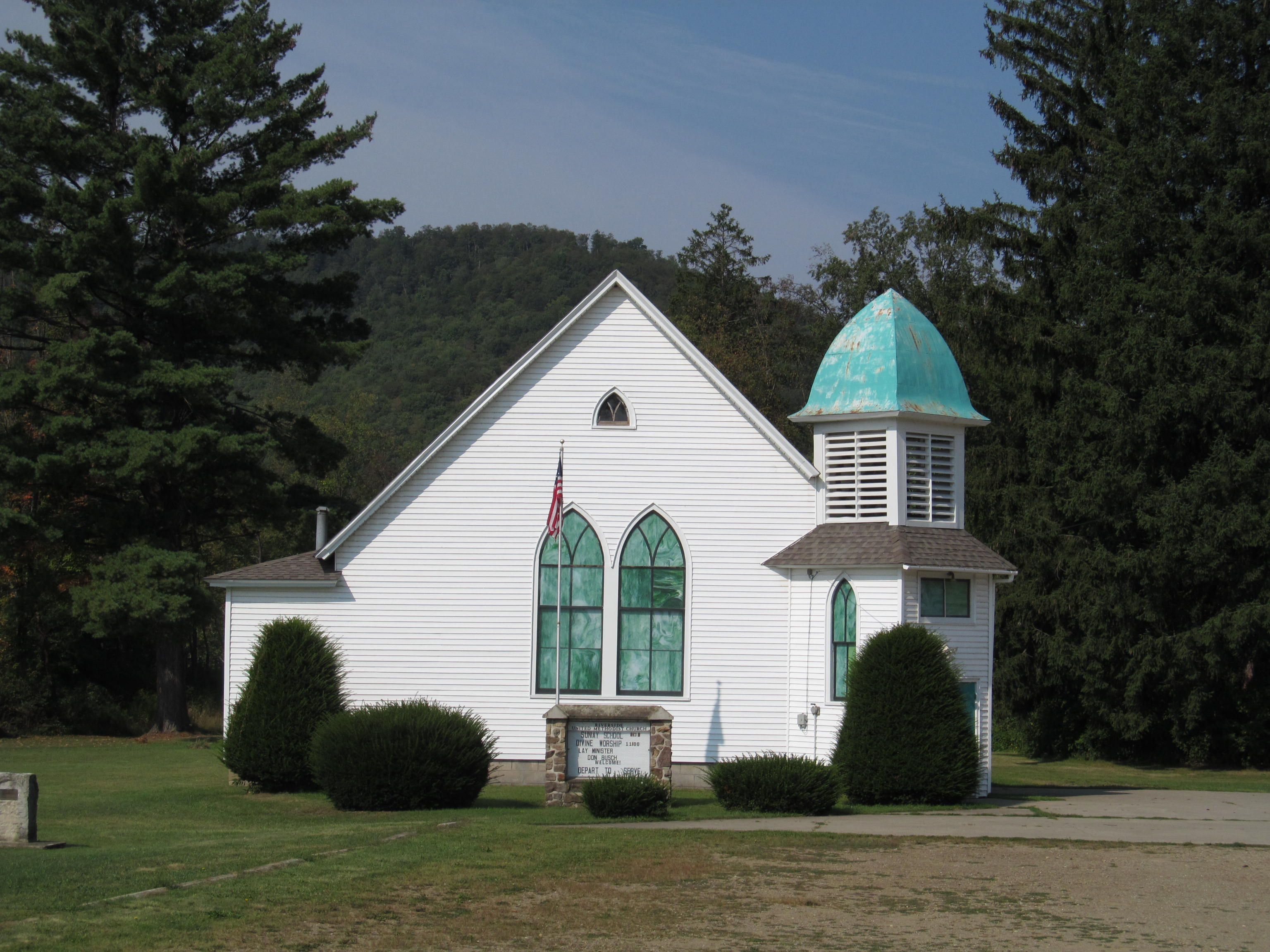
Riverside United Methodist Church by the Allegheny River in the town of Roulette.

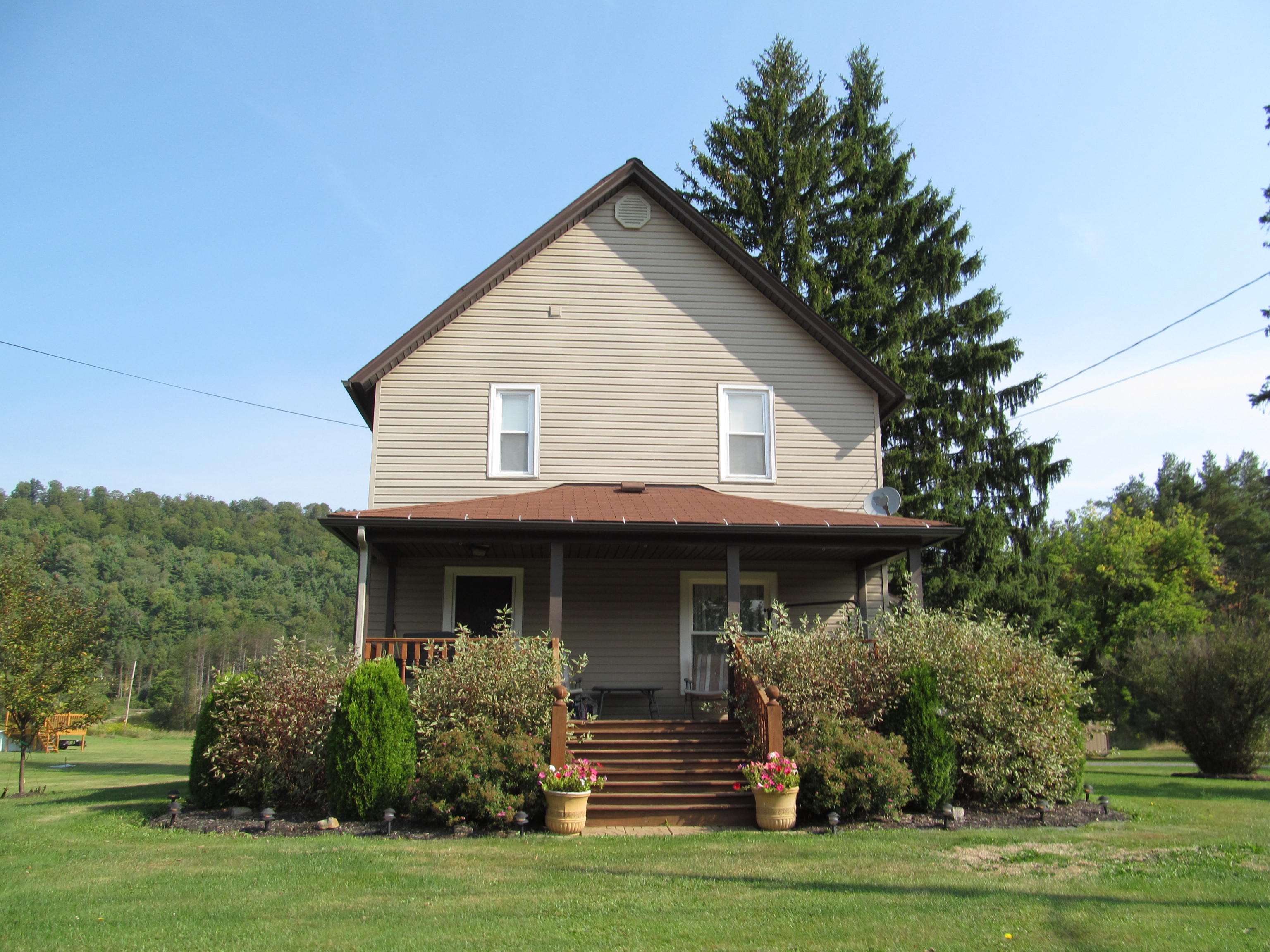
House in the town of Roulette.

== Geography ==
According to the United States Census Bureau, the township has a total area of 32.7 square miles (84.6 km^{2}), of which 32.7 square miles (84.6 km^{2}) is land and 0.03% is water.

Roulette Township is bordered by Pleasant Valley and Clara Townships to the north, Eulalia Township to the east, Keating Township to the south and McKean County to the west.

== History ==
Originally, the township was named Roulet, until (so the legend goes) the Post Office Department misspelled it. The original spelling was in honor of John Sigmund Roulet, who was an associate of John Keating, the leader of the original settlers of Potter County.

== Demographics ==
Historical population
Census	Pop.	Note	%±
2000	1,348		—
2010	1,197		−11.2%
2020	1,100		−8.1%
2021 (est.)	1,088		−1.1%
U.S. Decennial Census

As of the census of 2000, there were 1,348 people, 544 households, and 386 families residing in the township. The population density was 41.3 inhabitants per square mile (15.9/km^{2}). There were 671 housing units at an average density of 20.5/sq mi (7.9/km^{2}). The racial makeup of the township was 98.81% White, 0.07% African American, 0.22% Native American, 0.30% Asian, 0.52% from other races, and 0.07% from two or more races. Hispanic or Latino of any race were 1.11% of the population.

There were 544 households, out of which 31.8% had children under the age of 18 living with them, 55.3% were married couples living together, 9.9% had a female householder with no husband present, and 29.0% were non-families. 24.8% of all households were made up of individuals, and 10.3% had someone living alone who was 65 years of age or older. The average household size was 2.48 and the average family size was 2.91.

In the township the population was spread out, with 26.3% under the age of 18, 9.1% from 18 to 24, 25.8% from 25 to 44, 24.3% from 45 to 64, and 14.5% who were 65 years of age or older. The median age was 37 years. For every 100 females, there were 93.7 males. For every 100 females age 18 and over, there were 96.4 males.

The median income for a household in the township was $30,242, and the median income for a family was $34,297. Males had a median income of $30,541 versus $19,940 for females. The per capita income for the township was $14,340. About 9.6% of families and 11.1% of the population were below the poverty line, including 17.2% of those under age 18 and 7.4% of those age 65 or over.
