= Shinglehouse, Pennsylvania =

Borough in Pennsylvania, US

- Borough
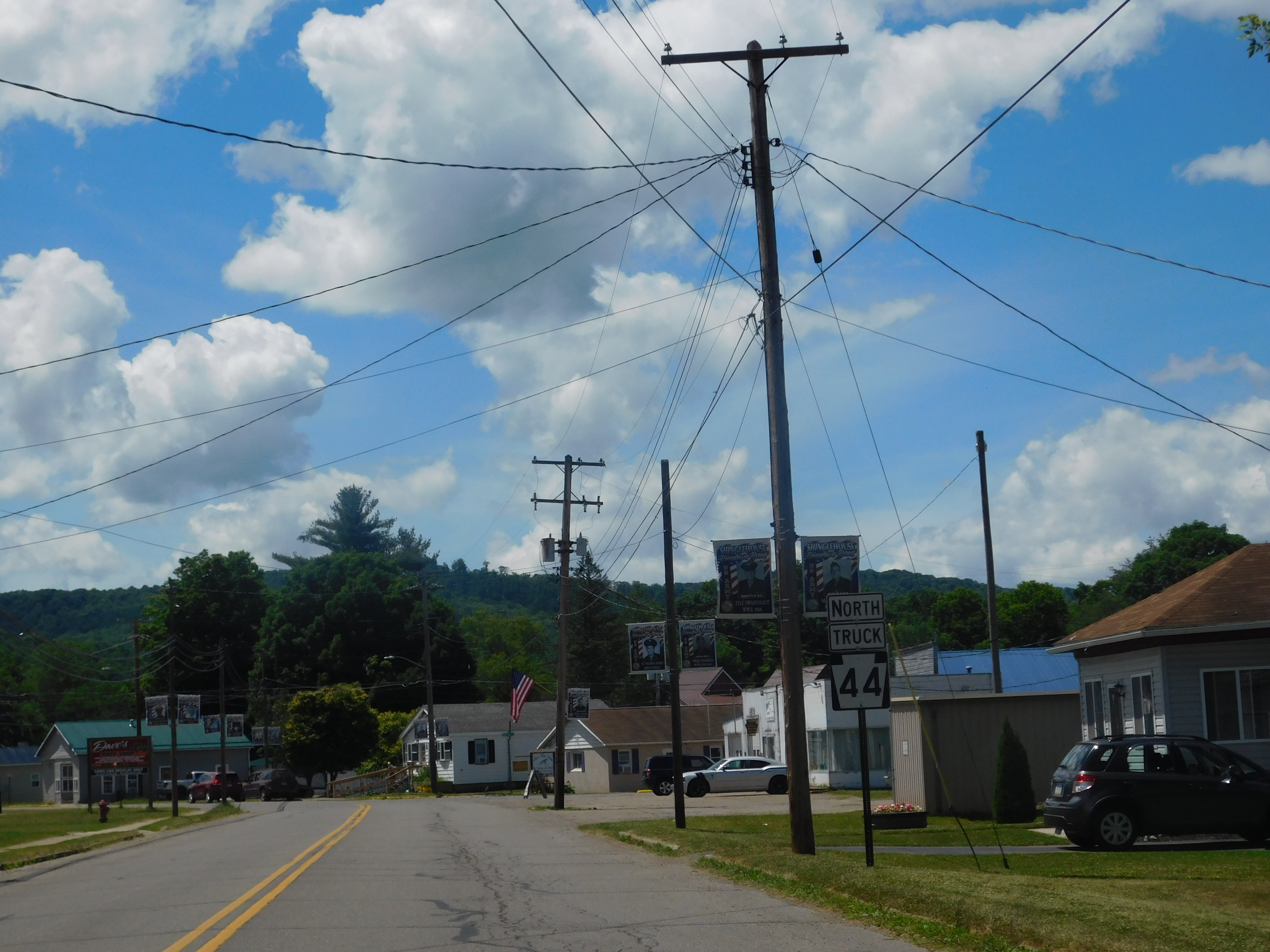
- Academy Street westbound

- Seal

- Location of Shinglehouse in Potter County, Pennsylvania.

- Location within the U.S. state of Pennsylvania Shinglehouse (the United States)
- Coordinates: 41°57′51″N 78°11′35″W
- Country: United States
- State: Pennsylvania
- County: Potter
- Settled: 1808
- Incorporated (borough): 1902

Area
  - Total: 2.10 sq mi (5.43 km^{2})
  - Land: 2.09 sq mi (5.42 km^{2})
  - Water: 0.0039 sq mi (0.01 km^{2})
- Elevation (borough benchmark): 1,492 ft (455 m)
- Highest elevation (southwest boundary of borough): 1,940 ft (590 m)
- Lowest elevation (Oswayo Creek): 1,465 ft (447 m)

Population (2020)
  - Total: 1,108 ▼
  - Estimate (2021): 1,097
  - Density: 503.3/sq mi (194.32/km^{2})
- Time zone: Eastern (EST)
  - Summer (DST): EDT
- ZIP code: 16748
- Area code: 814
- FIPS code: 42-70304
- Website: shinglehouseborough.org/home

Shinglehouse is a borough in Potter County, Pennsylvania, United States. The population was 1,108 at the time of the 2020 census.

The community was named for a landmark shingled inn near the original town site.

== Geography ==
Shinglehouse is located at 41°57′51″N 78°11′35″W (41.964182, -78.193188).

According to the United States Census Bureau, the borough has a total area of 2.1 square miles (5.4 km^{2}), all land.

== Demographics ==
Historical population
Census	Pop.	Note	%±
1910	1,598		—
1920	1,169		−26.8%
1930	1,380		18.0%
1940	1,106		−19.9%
1950	1,201		8.6%
1960	1,298		8.1%
1970	1,320		1.7%
1980	1,310		−0.8%
1990	1,243		−5.1%
2000	1,250		0.6%
2010	1,127		−9.8%
2020	1,103		−2.1%
2021 (est.)	1,097	▼	−0.5%

As of the census of 2000, there were one thousand two hundred and fifty people, five hundred and thirteen households and three hundred and nineteen families residing in the borough.

The population density was 599.4 inhabitants per square mile (231.4/km^{2}). There were five hundred and fifty housing units at an average density of 263.7 per square mile (101.8/km^{2}).

The racial makeup of the borough was 98.24% White, 0.16% Native American, 0.08% Asian, 0.32% from other races, and 1.20% from two or more races. Hispanic or Latino of any race were 0.80% of the population.

There were five hundred and thirteen households, out of which 30.0% had children under the age of eighteen living with them; 51.3% were married couples living together, 7.4% had a female householder with no husband present, and 37.8% were non-families. 34.3% of all households were made up of individuals, and 19.5% had someone living alone who was sixty-five years of age or older. The average household size was 2.44 and the average family size was 3.19.

In the borough the population was spread out, with 27.5% under the age of eighteen, 6.7% from eighteen to twenty-four, 25.7% from twenty-five to forty-four, 20.9% from forty-five to sixty-four, and 19.2% who were sixty-five years of age or older. The median age was thirty-eight years.

For every one hundred females there were 92.0 males. For every one hundred females aged eighteen and over, there were 84.1 males.

The median income for a household in the borough was $25,987, and the median income for a family was $35,750. Males had a median income of $30,417 compared with that of $20,000 for females. The per capita income for the borough was $13,253.

About 9.8% of families and 13.1% of the population were below the poverty line, including 13.0% of those under age 18 and 15.7% of those aged sixty-five or over.

== Transportation ==
In the late 19th and early 20th centuries, Shinglehouse was served by the New York & Pennsylvania Railroad.

== Notable people ==
- Fielder Jones, baseball player and manager.
- William C. Davis, Jr., ballistic engineer and author.
- Myrtl Meriwether, first Miss America
