= Clara Township, Pennsylvania =

Township in Pennsylvania, US

Coordinates: 41°51′00″N 78°07′59″W

- Township
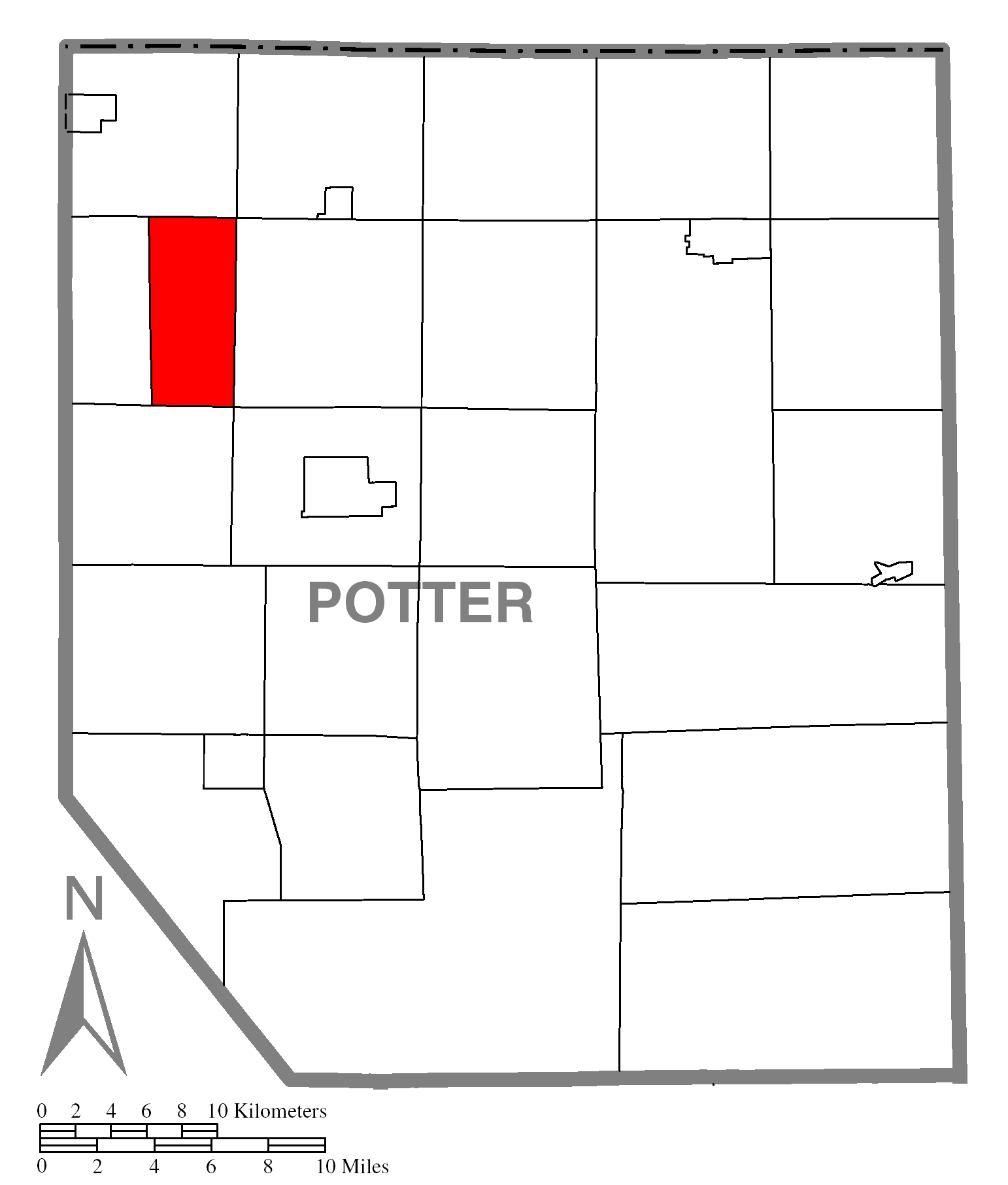
- Map of Potter County, Pennsylvania highlighting Clara Township

- Map of Potter County, Pennsylvania
- Country: United States
- State: Pennsylvania
- County: Potter
- Settled: 1828
- Incorporated: 1832

Area
  - Total: 19.64 sq mi (50.88 km^{2})
  - Land: 19.64 sq mi (50.88 km^{2})
  - Water: 0 sq mi (0.00 km^{2})

Population (2020)
  - Total: 177 ▼
  - Estimate (2021): 177
  - Density: 9.8/sq mi (3.79/km^{2})
- Time zone: UTC-5 (EST)
  - Summer (DST): UTC-4 (EDT)
- FIPS code: 42-105-13760

Clara Township is a township in Potter County, Pennsylvania, United States. The population was 177 at the 2020 census.

== History ==
On May 18, 2021, the township voted 72% to 25% to create a Home Rule Government Study Commission, the first step to incorporating the township as either a borough or city.

== Geography ==
According to the United States Census Bureau, the township has a total area of 19.8 square miles (51 km^{2}), all land.

Clara Township is bordered by Sharon Township to the north, Hebron Township to the east, Roulette Township to the south and Pleasant Valley Township to the west.

== Demographics ==
Historical population
Census	Pop.	Note	%±
2000	168		—
2010	199		18.5%
2020	177		−11.1%
2021 (est.)	177		0.0%
U.S. Decennial Census

As of the census of 2000, there were 168 people, 66 households, and 52 families residing in the township. The population density was 8.5 people per square mile (3.3 people/km^{2}). There were 146 housing units at an average density of 7.4 units per square mile (2.9 units/km^{2}). The racial makeup of the township was 100.00% White.

There were 66 households, out of which 33.3% had children under the age of 18 living with them, 66.7% were married couples living together, 6.1% had a female householder with no husband present, and 21.2% were non-families. 18.2% of all households were made up of individuals, and 9.1% had someone living alone who was 65 years of age or older. The average household size was 2.55 and the average family size was 2.87.

In the township the population was spread out, with 25.0% under the age of 18, 4.2% from 18 to 24, 29.2% from 25 to 44, 22.6% from 45 to 64, and 19.0% who were 65 years of age or older. The median age was 40 years. For every 100 females, there were 86.7 males. For every 100 females age 18 and over, there were 88.1 males.

The median income for a household in the township was $33,214, and the median income for a family was $36,250. Males had a median income of $28,333 versus $15,000 for females. The per capita income for the township was $17,929. About 7.7% of families and 11.5% of the population were below the poverty line, including 6.9% of those under the age of eighteen and 8.8% of those sixty five or over.
