= Oswayo Township, Pennsylvania =

Township in Pennsylvania, US

Coordinates: 41°57′00″N 77°58′59″W

- Township
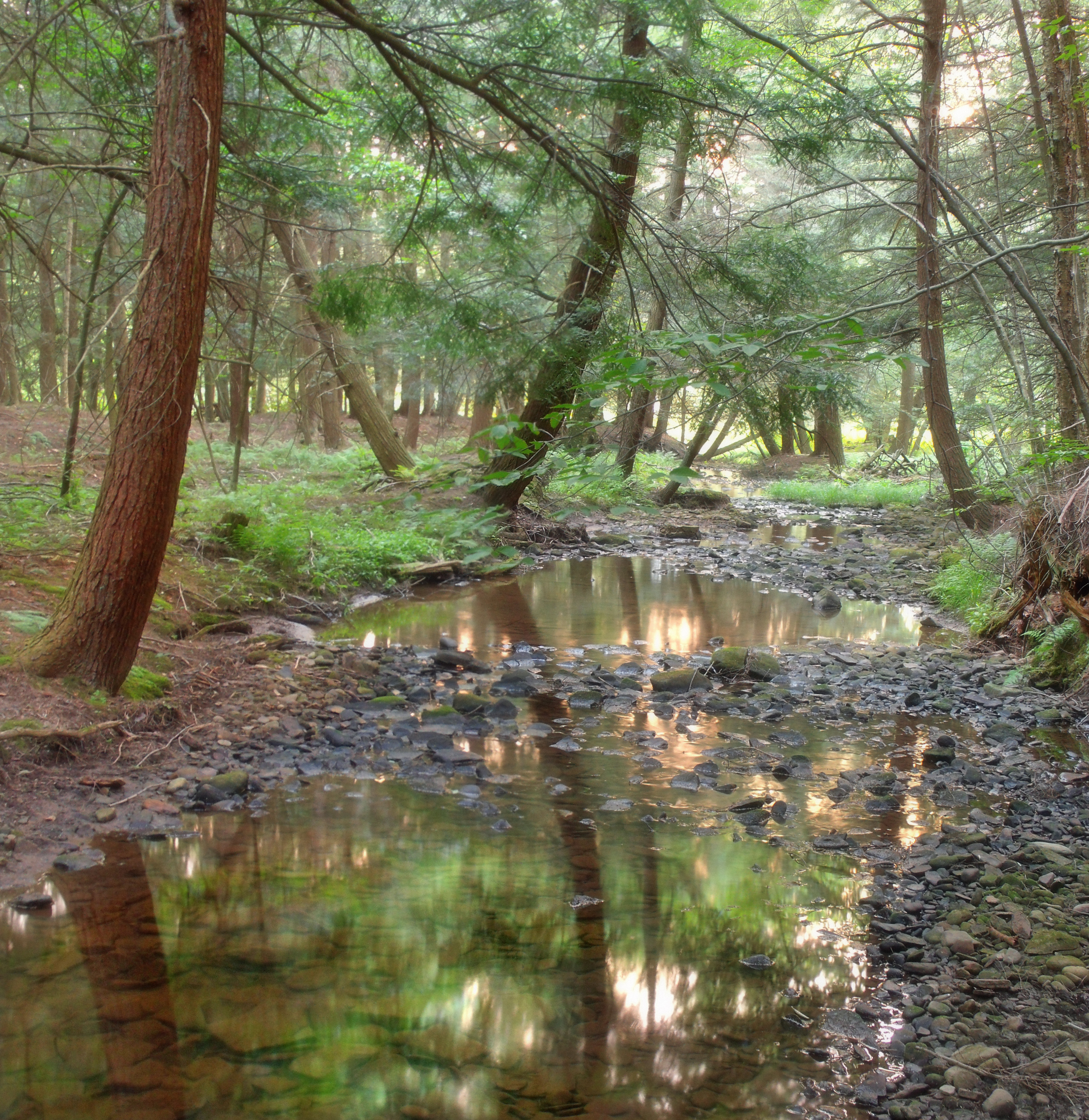
- A small creek in the township

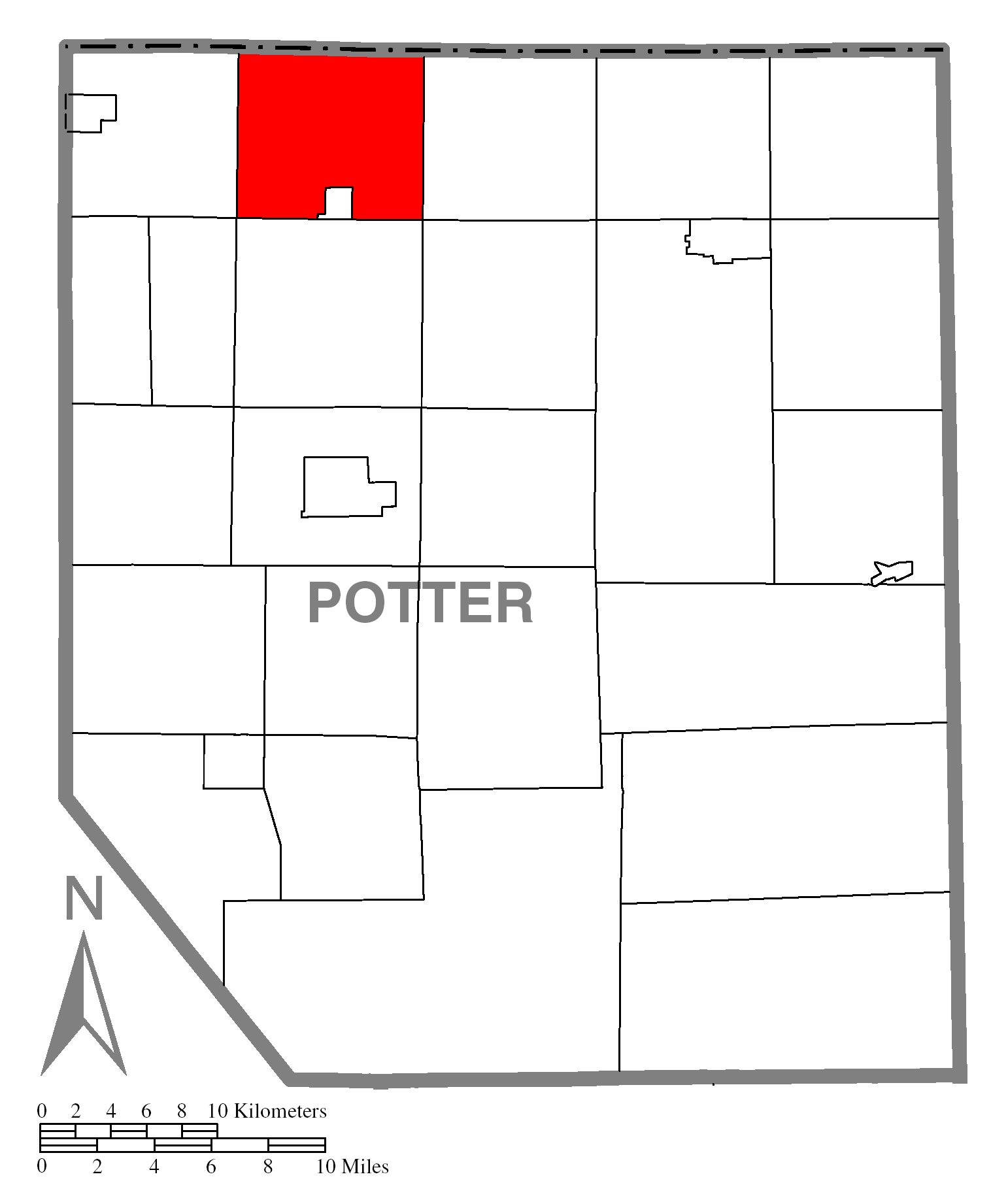
- Map of Potter County, Pennsylvania highlighting Oswayo Township

- Map of Potter County, Pennsylvania
- Country: United States
- State: Pennsylvania
- County: Potter
- Settled: 1829
- Incorporated: 1828

Area
  - Total: 37.27 sq mi (96.54 km^{2})
  - Land: 37.25 sq mi (96.49 km^{2})
  - Water: 0.015 sq mi (0.04 km^{2})

Population (2020)
  - Total: 224 ▼
  - Estimate (2021): 223
  - Density: 7.2/sq mi (2.79/km^{2})
- Time zone: UTC-5 (Eastern (EST))
  - Summer (DST): UTC-4 (EDT)
- Area code: 814
- FIPS code: 42-105-57288

Oswayo Township is a township in Potter County, Pennsylvania, United States. The population was 224 at the 2020 census.

Oswayo is a Native American name purported to mean "the place of flies".

== Geography ==
According to the United States Census Bureau, the township has a total area of 37.9 square miles (98.1 km^{2}), of which 37.8 square miles (98.0 km^{2}) is land and 0.04 square mile (0.1 km^{2}) (0.05%) is water.

Oswayo Township is bordered by New York to the north, Genesee Township to the south, Allegany Township and the borough of Oswayo to the south and Sharon Township to the west.

== Demographics ==
Historical population
Census	Pop.	Note	%±
2000	251		—
2010	278		10.8%
2020	224		−19.4%
2021 (est.)	223		−0.4%
U.S. Decennial Census

As of the census of 2000, there were 251 people, 91 households, and 67 families residing in the township. The population density was 6.6 people per square mile (2.6/km^{2}). There were 193 housing units at an average density of 5.1/sq mi (2.0/km^{2}). The racial makeup of the township was 99.60% White, and 0.40% from two or more races.

There were 91 households, out of which 33.0% had children under the age of 18 living with them, 61.5% were married couples living together, 7.7% had a female householder with no husband present, and 25.3% were non-families. 19.8% of all households were made up of individuals, and 11.0% had someone living alone who was 65 years of age or older. The average household size was 2.76 and the average family size was 3.19.

In the township the population was spread out, with 29.9% under the age of 18, 5.6% from 18 to 24, 27.1% from 25 to 44, 21.5% from 45 to 64, and 15.9% who were 65 years of age or older. The median age was 36 years. For every 100 females, there were 90.2 males. For every 100 females age 18 and over, there were 93.4 males.

The median income for a household in the township was $32,083, and the median income for a family was $36,071. Males had a median income of $35,938 versus $9,500 for females. The per capita income for the township was $13,263. About 10.6% of families and 20.2% of the population were below the poverty line, including 27.7% of those under the age of 18 and 21.2% of those 65 or over.
