= Reeds Gap State Park =

State park in Mifflin County, Pennsylvania

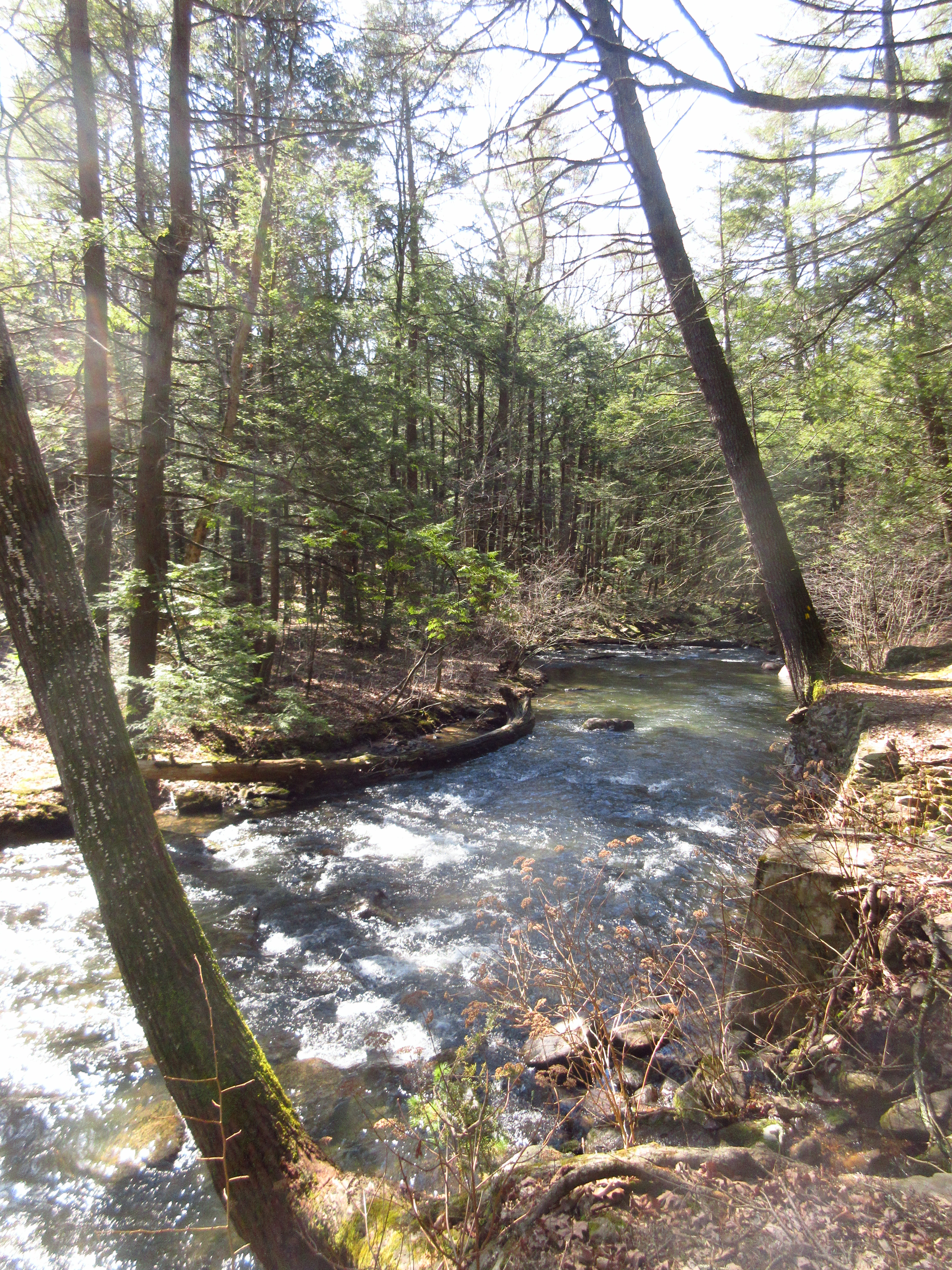
- Honey Creek as seen from a trail in the park.

- Location within Pennsylvania Location within the United States
- Interactive map of Reeds Gap State Park
- Location: Armagh Township, Mifflin County, Pennsylvania, United States
- Coordinates: 40°43′24″N 77°28′30″W
- Area: 220 acres (89 ha)
- Elevation: 820 feet (250 m)
- Established: 1938
- Administrator: Pennsylvania Department of Conservation and Natural Resources
- Website: Official website
- Pennsylvania State Parks

Reeds Gap State Park is a 220 acres (89 ha) Pennsylvania state park in Armagh Township, Mifflin County, Pennsylvania in the United States. The park is largely a wilderness area with large white pine and hemlock trees. Honey Creek flows through the park, providing a habitat for trout. Reeds Gap State Park is 7 miles (11 km) from U.S. Route 322 near Milroy in New Lancaster Valley and Bald Eagle State Forest.

== History ==
Reeds Gap is a natural water gap, a geologic formation caused by Honey Creek in a ridge, Hightop. This water gap was a natural gathering location for wild animals and it became a hunting ground for Native Americans and later the European settlers. These settlers named the area New Lancaster Valley. The gap became a gathering area for the homesteaders in the Mifflin County area. They gathered at the gap for bush meetings to listen to traveling evangelists and enjoy community fellowship. These meetings lasted until the 1920s.

Edward and Nancy Reed built a sawmill along Honey Creek in the mid-19th century. At this time the area was part of the lumber boom that swept through the wooded mountains of Pennsylvania from the mid-to-late 19th century and early 20th century. The Reeds operated the sawmill on Honey Creek for many years, until it was torn down and moved to Virginia by their son John. The trees were soon gone and the land was purchased by the Commonwealth of Pennsylvania on January 15, 1905. Parts of the land purchased by the state became Reeds Gap State Park and Poe Valley State Park.

== Recreation ==
=== Hunting and fishing ===
Hunting is permitted on 96 acres (39 ha) of Reeds Gap State Park. Hunters are expected to follow the rules and regulations of the Pennsylvania Game Commission. The common game species are ruffed grouse, squirrels, turkey, white-tailed deer, and black bears. Honey Creek is stocked with trout by the Pennsylvania Fish and Boat Commission. There is a population of native trout in Honey Creek and its tributaries.

=== Swimming and picnics ===
A swimming pool was built in 1965 to replace the dam in Honey Creek. It was shallow at both ends, reaching its greatest depth of five feet in the middle. Diving was prohibited. Lifeguards were stationed at the pool from 11:00 am until 7:00 pm. The main lifeguard post was located on the west side of the pool at its deepest point. The pool opened on Memorial Day weekend and closed Labor Day weekend. A much shallower "kiddie" pool was adjacent to the main pool. It was announced in March 2009 that both the adult pool and kid pool will not be reopening for the 2009 season, "amid mounting safety concerns and a long list of structural problems." The pool will be demolished, and not rebuilt. There are four wooded picnic areas at Reeds Gap State Park with 3 pavilions.

=== Hiking, cross-country skiing and camping ===
There are 5 hiking trails at Reeds Gap State Park. Reeds Gap Spur Trail is the longest at 18 miles (29 km). It begins at the park office and crosses over Reeds Gap to Poe Valley State Park. The other trails are all under 2 miles (3.2 km) and pass through the woods and follow the banks of Honey Creek. The trails are open to cross-country skiing during the winter months. Campers are limited to using tents in the rustic camping area.
