= Decatur Township, Pennsylvania =

Decatur Township is the name of some places in the U.S. state of Pennsylvania:

- Decatur Township, Clearfield County, Pennsylvania
- Decatur Township, Mifflin County, Pennsylvania
