= Bratton Township =

Bratton Township may refer to the following townships in the United States:

- Bratton Township, Ohio
- Bratton Township, Pennsylvania
