= Lumber City, Mifflin County, Pennsylvania =

Unincorporated community in Pennsylvania, US

Coordinates: 40°39′33″N 77°36′03″W

Lumber City (Mifflin County), Pennsylvania
- Census-designated place
- Interactive map of Lumber City (Mifflin County), Pennsylvania
- Country: United States
- State: Pennsylvania
- County: Mifflin

Population (2010)
  - Total: 255
- Time zone: UTC-5 (Eastern (EST))
  - Summer (DST): UTC-4 (EDT)

Lumber City is a census-designated place located in Brown Township, Mifflin County in the state of Pennsylvania, United States. It is located just off US 322 in central Mifflin County, very close to the community of Reedsville. As of the 2010 census, the population was 255 residents.
