= Church Hill, Pennsylvania =

Unincorporated community in Pennsylvania, US

Coordinates: 40°41′30″N 77°35′28″W

- Census-designated place
- Interactive map of Church Hill, Pennsylvania
- Country: United States
- State: Pennsylvania
- County: Mifflin

Area
  - Total: 1.39 sq mi (3.59 km^{2})
  - Land: 1.39 sq mi (3.59 km^{2})
  - Water: 0 sq mi (0.00 km^{2})

Population (2020)
  - Total: 1,711
  - Density: 1,234.9/sq mi (476.81/km^{2})
- Time zone: UTC-5 (Eastern (EST))
  - Summer (DST): UTC-4 (EDT)
- ZIP code: 17084
- Area code: 717
- FIPS code: 42-13596

Church Hill is a census-designated place located in Armagh and Brown Townships in Mifflin County in the state of Pennsylvania, United States. It is located north of the borough of Burnham. As of the 2010 census, the population was 1,627 residents.

== Demographics ==
Historical population
Census	Pop.	Note	%±
2020	1,711		—
U.S. Decennial Census
