= Potlicker Flats, Pennsylvania =

Unincorporated community in Pennsylvania, US

Coordinates: 40°43′41″N 77°36′31″W

- Census-designated place
- Interactive map of Potlicker Flats, Pennsylvania
- Country: United States
- State: Pennsylvania
- County: Mifflin

Area
  - Total: 0.17 sq mi (0.44 km^{2})
  - Land: 0.17 sq mi (0.44 km^{2})
  - Water: 0 sq mi (0.00 km^{2})

Population (2020)
  - Total: 174
  - Density: 1,016/sq mi (392.1/km^{2})
- Time zone: UTC-5 (Eastern (EST))
  - Summer (DST): UTC-4 (EDT)
- FIPS code: 42-62340

Potlicker Flats is a census-designated place located in Armagh Township, Mifflin County in the state of Pennsylvania, United States. The community is located along US 322 in northern Mifflin County, north of the community of Milroy. As of the 2010 census the population was 172 residents.

== Demographics ==
Historical population
Census	Pop.	Note	%±
2020	174		—
U.S. Decennial Census

== Etymology ==
According to locals, the term "pot licker" refers to poor residents in the area that would make stews in iron pots. In order to not waste food they licked the bottom of the pots. The community is on a flat strip at the base of the Seven Mountains, hence the name "Potlicker Flats".
