= Brown Township, Pennsylvania =

Brown Township is the name of two places in the U.S. state of Pennsylvania:

- Brown Township, Lycoming County, Pennsylvania
- Brown Township, Mifflin County, Pennsylvania

== See also ==
- Brownsville Township, Fayette County, Pennsylvania
