= Wagner, Pennsylvania =

Unincorporated community in Pennsylvania, US

Coordinates: 40°40′53″N 77°23′17″W

- Census-designated place
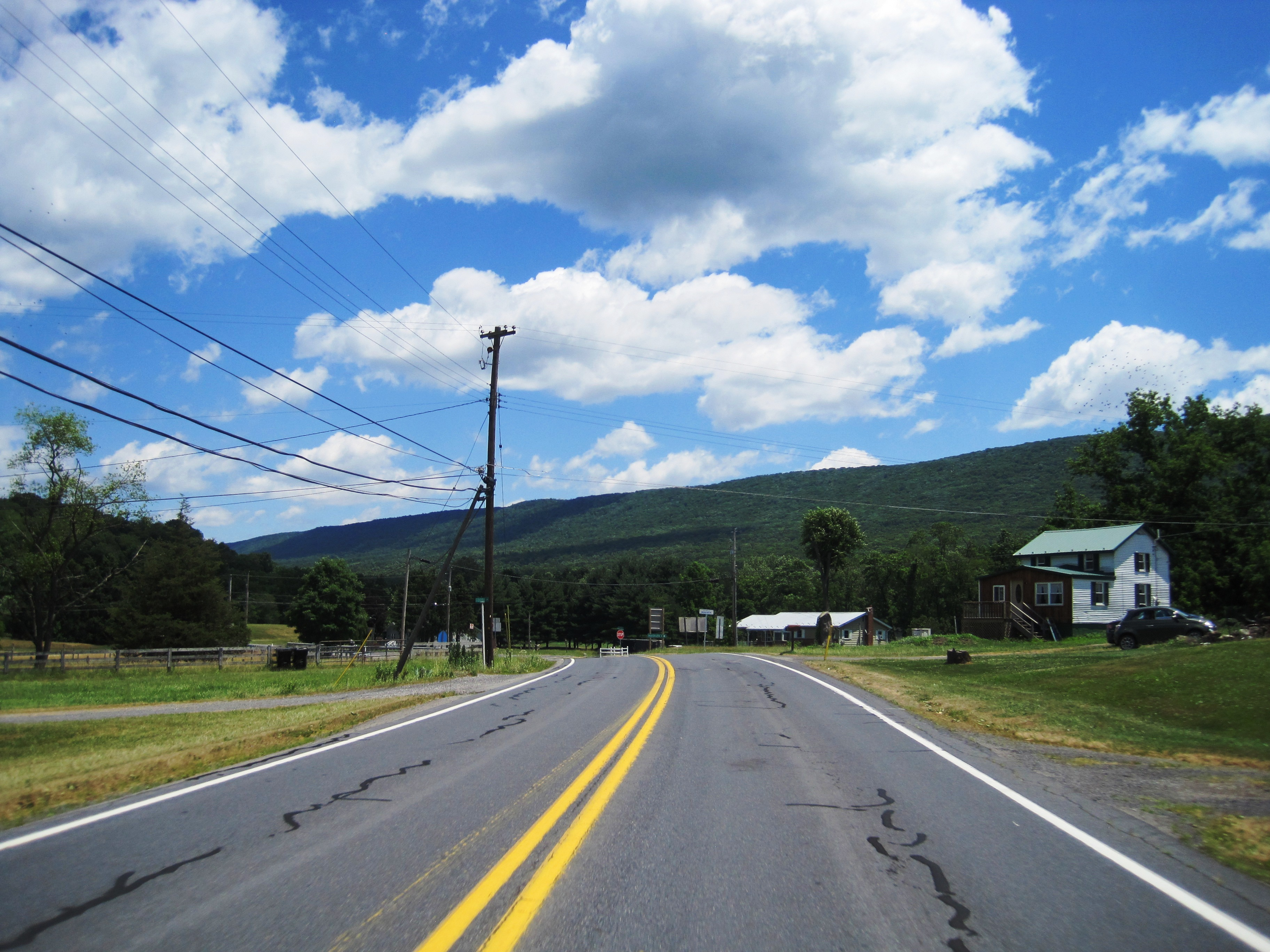
- US 522 northbound in Wagner
- Interactive map of Wagner, Pennsylvania
- Country: United States
- State: Pennsylvania
- County: Mifflin

Population (2010)
  - Total: 128
- Time zone: UTC-5 (Eastern (EST))
  - Summer (DST): UTC-4 (EDT)

Wagner is a census-designated place located in Decatur Township, Mifflin County in the state of Pennsylvania, United States. It is located along U.S. Route 522 in eastern Mifflin County, north of Shade Mountain. As of the 2010 census the population was 128 residents.
