= Kistler, Pennsylvania =

Borough in Pennsylvania, US

- Borough
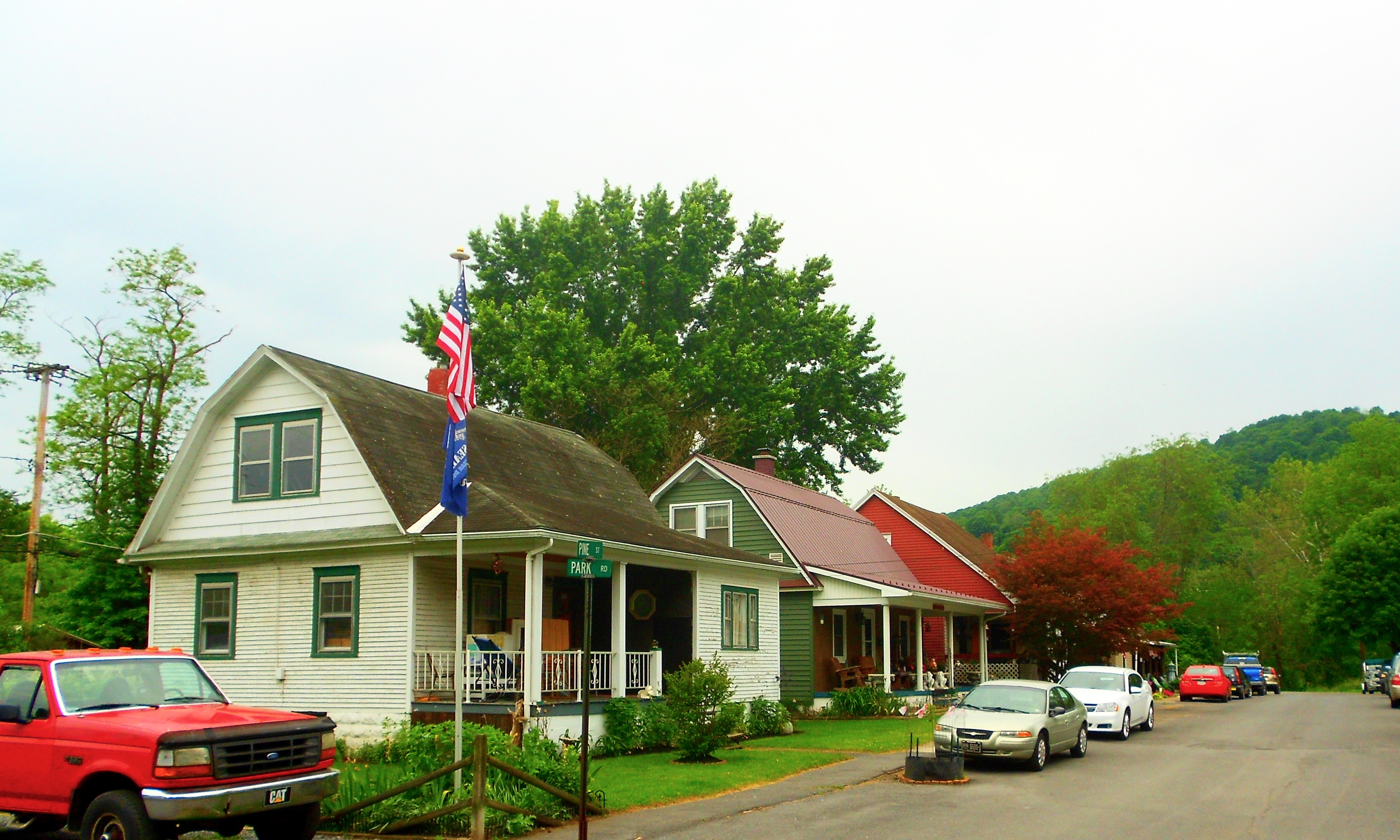
- Street in Kistler

- Location of Kistler in Mifflin County, Pennsylvania.

- Location within Pennsylvania Location within the United States
- Coordinates: 40°22′50″N 77°52′04″W
- Country: United States
- State: Pennsylvania
- County: Mifflin
- Incorporated: 1925

Government
  - Type: Borough Council
  - Mayor: Jeff Brown
  - Council President: Amy Smith
  - Council Vice President: Paula Brown

Area
  - Total: 0.25 sq mi (0.65 km^{2})
  - Land: 0.25 sq mi (0.65 km^{2})
  - Water: 0 sq mi (0.00 km^{2})

Population (2020)
  - Total: 291
  - Density: 1,151.9/sq mi (444.74/km^{2})
- Time zone: UTC-5 (Eastern (EST))
  - Summer (DST): UTC-4 (EDT)
- Zip code: 17066
- Area code: 814
- FIPS code: 42-40016
- Local phone exchanges: 542, 543

Kistler is a borough in Mifflin County, Pennsylvania, United States. The population was 292 at the 2020 census.

== Geography ==
Kistler is located at 40°22′50″N 77°52′4″W (40.380652, -77.867737).

According to the United States Census Bureau, the borough has a total area of 0.3 square miles (0.78 km^{2}), of which 0.3 square miles (0.78 km^{2}) is land and 0.04 square miles (0.10 km^{2}) (7.14%) is water.

== History ==
Kistler, Pennsylvania is one of the United States' lesser known Company Towns. A Company Town is a settlement built and operated by a single business enterprise. Most company towns were established between 1880 and 1930 during the early industrial age. See list of company towns.

Kistler was initially established to meet the needs of a large manufacturing plant by providing comfortable homes for its workmen within close proximity of the factory. The town was built and owned by the Mount Union Refractories Company (MURC), a large brick making plant originally located at the foot of Mount Union, Pennsylvania.

The MURC sought to design and implement an industrial village which provided the best home and surrounding environment for its employees, in the hope that this would achieve the highest possible working efficiency. In order to successfully accomplish this goal, the company appointed distinguished town planner John Nolen to design a model company town. John Nolen was a prominent planner of his time, producing nearly four hundred planning projects, with more than 25 of those company towns. Nolen published New Towns for Old in 1927, which carefully outlines in detail the planning precautions taken in the towns’ design and also includes illustrations of Kistler’s planned layout.

=== Development ===
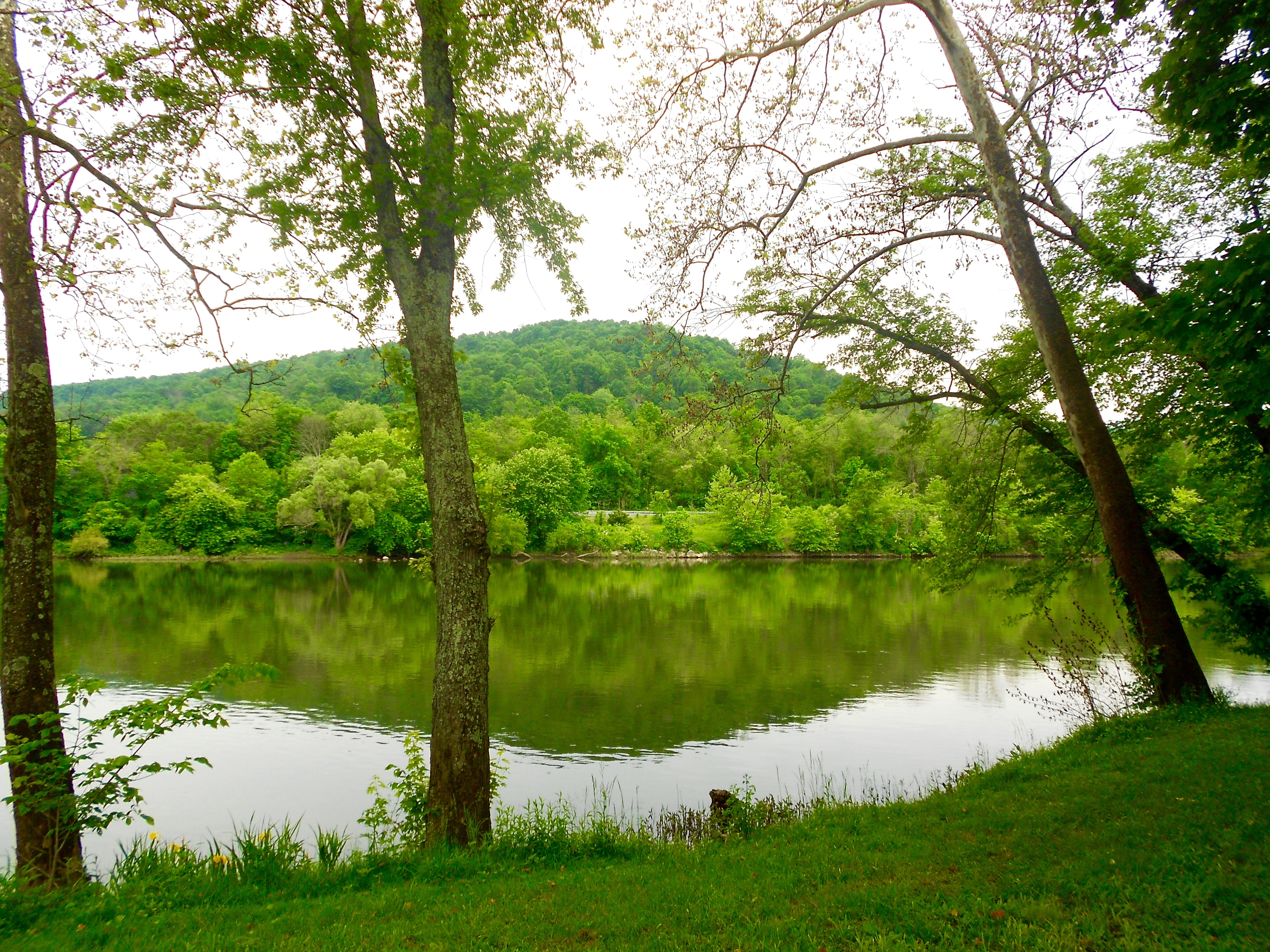
Juniata River as seen from Kistler

Nineteen-eighteen saw the construction of the industrial village. At this stage, MURC employed some seven hundred employees. The town of Kistler was located on the east side of the Juniata River, one and one-half miles east of the Refractories site. MURC acquired a land parcel of approximately sixty acres on the opposite side of the river from the works, in order to reduce the potential spread of dust, dirt and noise. The site of the planned town was triangular in shape, bordered by the Juniata River, the Pennsylvania Railroad Topography and preexisting agricultural land.

=== Town Layout ===
Although there was no definite axis in John Nolen’s design, the centre point of the plan was said to be the major recreational facility, ‘Kistler Green’. These well planned open spaces provided recreational areas for all residents. Park Road and Nolen Street were the two arterials leading into the development from the south, while running parallel to the railway is State Street. Nolen’s original plan included provisions for a proposed train station.

=== Street Design ===
There were two major street widths in the design of Kistler. The forty foot design allowed for eighteen foot of road and twenty-two feet of sidewalk and planting space. In contrast the seventy foot street allowed for two lanes with a central twenty-two foot parking strip. The street widths played a pivotal role in allocating as much area to the lot owner as possible whilst avoiding street paving costs. In the early stages of the development while the streets would not have been prone to large volumes of traffic throughput they served a secondary purpose; play spaces for children.

=== Park Features ===
The large amount of open areas in Nolen’s design retained the natural woods which included willow, locust, sycamore, persimmon and black and white oak. The river embankment was to be reserved for parkland with the northern end comprising a playground and picnic facilities and the south a boat landing, athletic field, baseball diamond and a field house.

=== Housing design ===
The houses constructed for employees were built with varying character in detached or semi detached quadrangles. This was thought to bring some individuality among the residents and their houses and to generally provide the best surroundings for the employees and their families. Dwellings were built on block sizes of forty feet in width by one hundred feet in depth. Almost two hundred dwellings were built in total, with houses ranging from four to eight rooms in total and all houses including their own baths and porches.

=== Community wellbeing ===
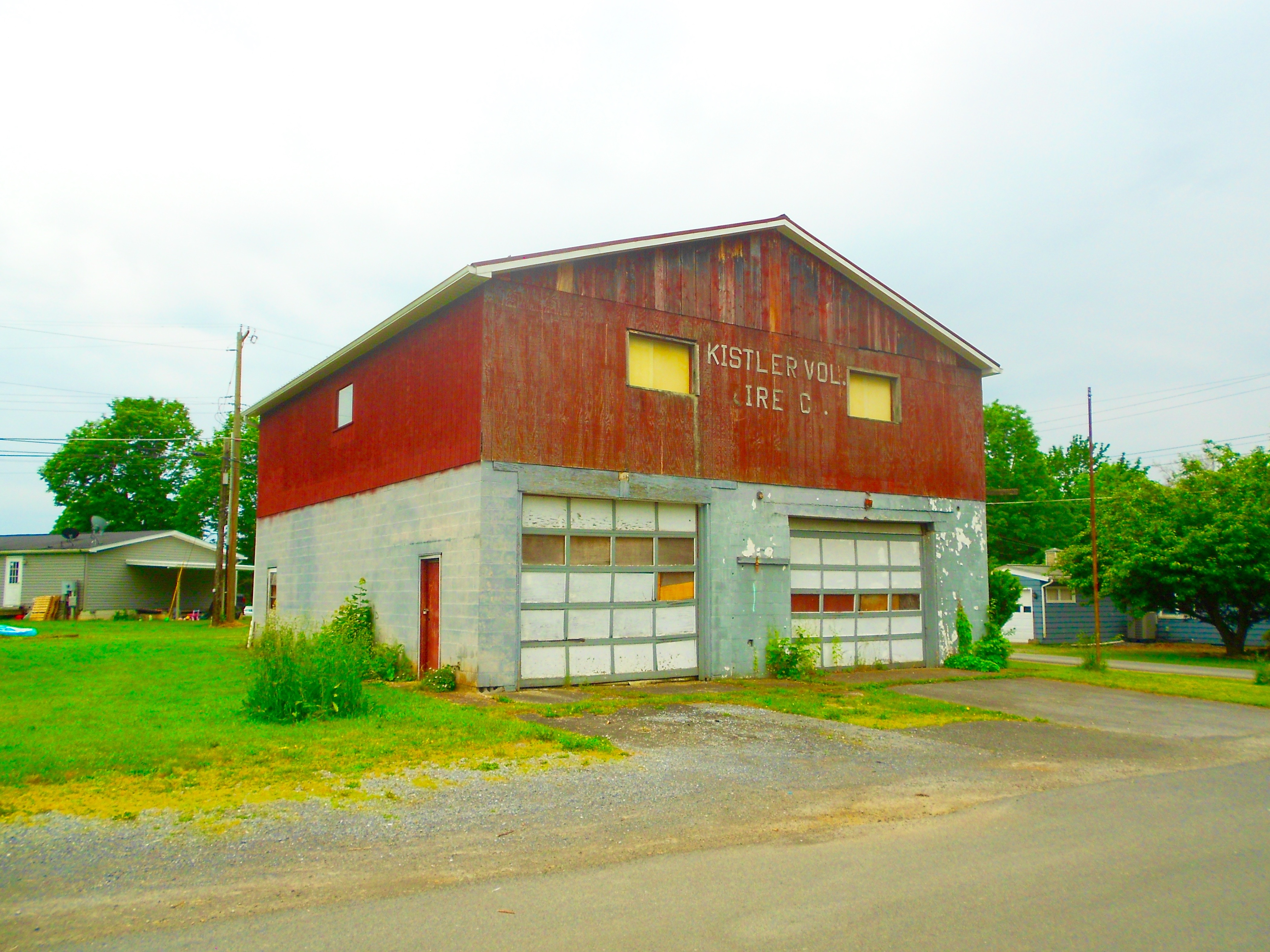
The former volunteer fire company firehouse

It was evident that Nolen and MURC gave considerable attention to the welfare of the citizens of Kistler. The design aspired to provide not only comfortable housing and surrounds, but equally importantly it attempted to promote a sense of belonging and citizenship among the residents. John Nolen discusses the success of Kistler and its design in his book New Towns for Old (1927) when he states that ‘there are few places in this country where the problem of low cost housing, primarily for the unskilled worker has been better solved for the employer and employee alike.

== Demographics ==
Historical population
Census	Pop.	Note	%±
1930	518		—
1940	494		−4.6%
1950	468		−5.3%
1960	391		−16.5%
1970	369		−5.6%
1980	364		−1.4%
1990	314		−13.7%
2000	344		9.6%
2010	320		−7.0%
2020	291		−9.1%
2021 (est.)	291	Steady	0.0%

As of the census of 2000, there were 344 people, 138 households, and 90 families residing in the borough. The population density was 1,341.1 inhabitants per square mile (517.8/km^{2}). There were 141 housing units at an average density of 549.7 per square mile (212.2/km^{2}). The racial makeup of the borough was 97.38% White, 0.58% African American, 0.29% Asian, and 1.74% from two or more races. Hispanic or Latino of any race were 0.58% of the population.

There were 138 households, out of which 39.9% had children under the age of 18 living with them, 42.8% were married couples living together, 13.8% had a female householder with no husband present, and 34.1% were non-families. 30.4% of all households were made up of individuals, and 16.7% had someone living alone who was 65 years of age or older. The average household size was 2.39 and the average family size was 2.95.

In the borough the population was spread out, with 29.9% under the age of 18, 6.4% from 18 to 24, 31.4% from 25 to 44, 21.2% from 45 to 64, and 11.0% who were 65 years of age or older. The median age was 34 years. For every 100 females, there were 84.9 males. For every 100 females age 18 and over, there were 94.4 males.

The median income for a household in the borough was $25,089, and the median income for a family was $27,500. Males had a median income of $22,679 versus $19,688 for females. The per capita income for the borough was $11,365. About 25.0% of families and 28.4% of the population were below the poverty line, including 31.1% of those under age 18 and 30.6% of those age 65 or over.
