= Granville Township, Mifflin County, Pennsylvania =

Township in Pennsylvania, US

Coordinates: 40°35′00″N 77°39′59″W

- Township
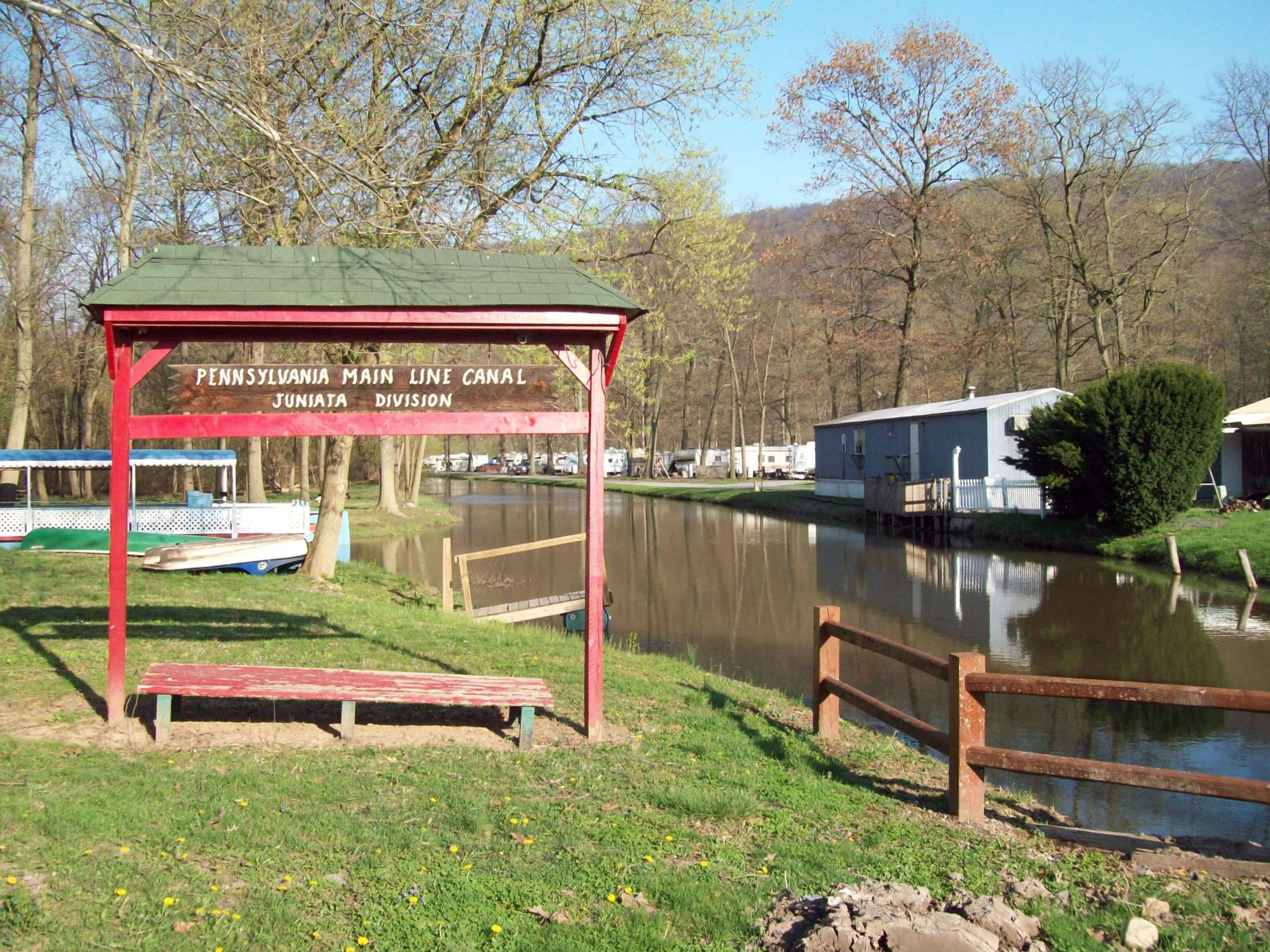
- Part of the Juniata Division Canal

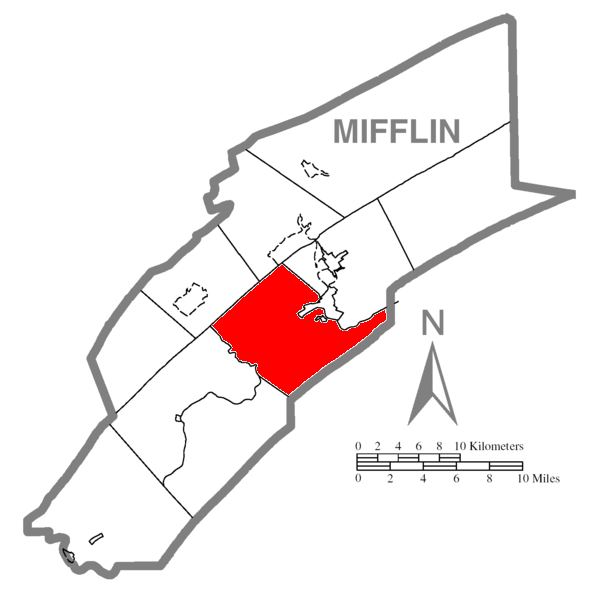
- Map of Mifflin County, Pennsylvania highlighting Granville Township

- Map of Mifflin County, Pennsylvania
- Country: United States
- State: Pennsylvania
- County: Mifflin
- Settled: 1755
- Incorporated: 1833

Government
  - Type: Board of Supervisors
  - Chairman: Mark M. Ellinger
  - Vice-chairman: William W. Page
  - Supervisor: James A. Smith

Area
  - Total: 41.15 sq mi (106.57 km^{2})
  - Land: 40.23 sq mi (104.19 km^{2})
  - Water: 0.92 sq mi (2.38 km^{2})

Population (2020)
  - Total: 4,625 ▼
  - Estimate (2022): 4,589
  - Density: 125/sq mi (48.3/km^{2})
- Time zone: UTC-5 (Eastern (EST))
  - Summer (DST): UTC-4 (EDT)
- Area code: 717
- FIPS code: 42-087-30480
- Website: Granville Township
- Local phone exchanges: 242, 247, 248, 363

Granville Township is a township in Mifflin County, Pennsylvania, United States. The population was 4,625 at the 2020 census.

== History ==
The Pennsylvania Main Line Canal, Juniata Division, Canal Section was listed on the National Register of Historic Places in 2002.

== Geography ==
According to the United States Census Bureau, the township has a total area of 40.9 square miles (106 km^{2}), of which 40.2 square miles (104 km^{2}) is land and 0.7 square miles (1.8 km^{2}) (1.81%) is water. It contains the census-designated place of Granville and part of Strodes Mills.

== Demographics ==
Historical population
Census	Pop.	Note	%±
2010	5,104		—
2020	4,625		−9.4%
2022 (est.)	4,589		−0.8%
U.S. Decennial Census

As of the census of 2000, there were 4,895 people, 1,971 households, and 1,452 families residing in the township. The population density was 121.9 inhabitants per square mile (47.1/km^{2}). There were 2,110 housing units at an average density of 52.5 per square mile (20.3/km^{2}). The racial makeup of the township was 98.77% White, 0.35% African American, 0.18% Native American, 0.25% Asian, 0.10% from other races, and 0.35% from two or more races. Hispanic or Latino of any race were 0.45% of the population.

There were 1,971 households, out of which 29.0% had children under the age of 18 living with them, 62.1% were married couples living together, 7.1% had a female householder with no husband present, and 26.3% were non-families. 22.0% of all households were made up of individuals, and 8.5% had someone living alone who was 65 years of age or older. The average household size was 2.45 and the average family size was 2.84.

In the township the population was spread out, with 22.4% under the age of 18, 6.2% from 18 to 24, 27.9% from 25 to 44, 27.8% from 45 to 64, and 15.6% who were 65 years of age or older. The median age was 41 years. For every 100 females there were 99.2 males. For every 100 females age 18 and over, there were 97.9 males.

The median income for a household in the township was $37,690, and the median income for a family was $42,222. Males had a median income of $31,738 versus $19,362 for females. The per capita income for the township was $16,807. About 6.1% of families and 9.1% of the population were below the poverty line, including 11.9% of those under age 18 and 8.7% of those age 65 or over.
