= Longfellow, Pennsylvania =

Unincorporated community in Pennsylvania, US

Coordinates: 40°30′27″N 77°39′50″W

- Census-designated place
- Interactive map of Longfellow, Pennsylvania
- Country: United States
- State: Pennsylvania
- County: Mifflin

Area
  - Total: 0.64 sq mi (1.67 km^{2})
  - Land: 0.64 sq mi (1.67 km^{2})
  - Water: 0 sq mi (0.00 km^{2})

Population (2020)
  - Total: 183
  - Density: 284.1/sq mi (109.68/km^{2})
- Time zone: UTC-5 (Eastern (EST))
  - Summer (DST): UTC-4 (EDT)
- FIPS code: 42-44528

Longfellow is a census-designated place located in Bratton Township, Mifflin County in the state of Pennsylvania, United States. It is located along Pennsylvania Route 103 in southern Mifflin County. As of the 2010 census, the population was 215 residents.

== Demographics ==
Historical population
| Census | Pop. | Note | %± |
|---|---|---|---|
| 2020 | 183 | | — |
U.S. Decennial Census
