= Mattawana, Pennsylvania =

Unincorporated community in Pennsylvania, US

Coordinates: 40°29′42″N 77°43′52″W

- Census-designated place
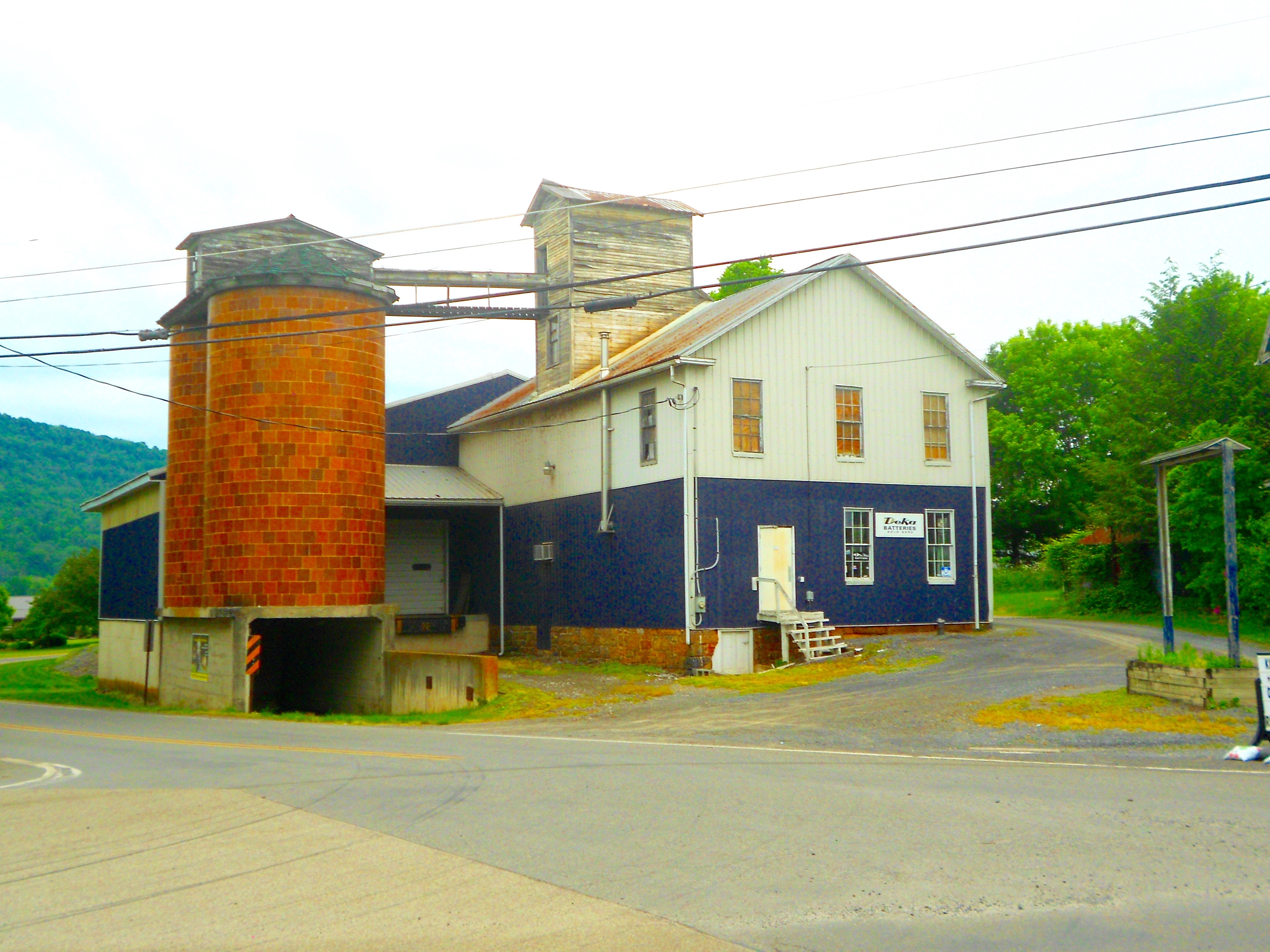
- Feed mill
- Interactive map of Mattawana, Pennsylvania
- Country: United States
- State: Pennsylvania
- County: Mifflin

Area
  - Total: 0.78 sq mi (2.03 km^{2})
  - Land: 0.78 sq mi (2.02 km^{2})
  - Water: 0 sq mi (0.00 km^{2})

Population (2020)
  - Total: 193
  - Density: 247.0/sq mi (95.37/km^{2})
- Time zone: UTC-5 (Eastern (EST))
  - Summer (DST): UTC-4 (EDT)
- FIPS code: 42-48072

Mattawana is a census-designated place located in Bratton Township, Mifflin County in the state of Pennsylvania, United States on the east bank of the Juniata River. The community is located near the junction of U.S. Route 522 and Pennsylvania Route 103, across the river from the borough of McVeytown. As of the 2010 census the population was 276 residents.

Mattawana is a name derived from a Native American language purported to mean "river of shallows" Or "place of fine furs".

== Demographics ==
Historical population
| Census | Pop. | Note | %± |
|---|---|---|---|
| 2020 | 193 | | — |
U.S. Decennial Census
