= Atkinson Mills, Pennsylvania =

Unincorporated community in Pennsylvania, US

Coordinates: 40°27′19″N 77°49′04″W

- Census-designated place
- Interactive map of Atkinson Mills, Pennsylvania
- Country: United States
- State: Pennsylvania
- County: Mifflin

Area
  - Total: 1.02 sq mi (2.64 km^{2})
  - Land: 1.02 sq mi (2.64 km^{2})
  - Water: 0 sq mi (0.00 km^{2})

Population (2020)
  - Total: 152
  - Density: 149.1/sq mi (57.58/km^{2})
- Time zone: UTC-5 (Eastern (EST))
  - Summer (DST): UTC-4 (EDT)
- FIPS code: 42-03424

Atkinson Mills is a census-designated place located in Wayne Township, Mifflin County in the state of Pennsylvania, United States. It is located along U.S. Route 522 in southern Mifflin County, between the boroughs of Mount Union and McVeytown. As of the 2020 census, Atkinson Mills had a population of 152.

== Demographics ==
Historical population
Census	Pop.	Note	%±
2020	152		—
U.S. Decennial Census
