= Yeagertown, Pennsylvania =

Unincorporated community in Pennsylvania, US

- Census-designated place
- Location within the U.S. state of Pennsylvania Yeagertown (the United States)
- Coordinates: 40°38′28″N 77°34′46″W
- Country: United States
- State: Pennsylvania
- County: Mifflin

Area
  - Total: 0.46 sq mi (1.2 km^{2})
  - Land: 0.46 sq mi (1.2 km^{2})

Population (2000)
  - Total: 1,035
  - Density: 2,200/sq mi (860/km^{2})
- Time zone: UTC-5 (Eastern (EST))
  - Summer (DST): UTC-4 (EDT)
- ZIP codes: 17099
- Area codes: 717 and 223

Yeagertown is a census-designated place (CDP) in Derry Township, Mifflin County, Pennsylvania, United States. The population was 1,035 at the 2000 census.

== General information ==
- ZIP Code: 17099
- Area Code: 717, 223
- School District: Mifflin County School District

== Geography ==
Yeagertown is located at 40°38′28″N 77°34′46″W (40.641204, -77.579530).

According to the United States Census Bureau, the CDP has a total area of 0.5 square miles (1.3 km^{2}), all land.

== Demographics ==
As of the census of 2000, there were 1,035 people, 416 households, and 299 families residing in the CDP. The population density was 2,221.0 inhabitants per square mile (857.5/km^{2}). There were 449 housing units at an average density of 963.5 per square mile (372.0/km^{2}). The racial makeup of the CDP was 98.26% White, 0.39% African American, 0.29% Asian, 0.58% from other races, and 0.48% from two or more races. Hispanic or Latino of any race were 0.77% of the population.

There were 416 households, out of which 33.9% had children under the age of 18 living with them, 57.0% were married couples living together, 11.3% had a female householder with no husband present, and 27.9% were non-families. 24.3% of all households were made up of individuals, and 14.7% had someone living alone who was 65 years of age or older. The average household size was 2.49 and the average family size was 2.92.

In the CDP, the population was spread out, with 25.0% under the age of 18, 6.8% from 18 to 24, 28.9% from 25 to 44, 25.4% from 45 to 64, and 13.9% who were 65 years of age or older. The median age was 36 years. For every 100 females, there were 92.7 males. For every 100 females age 18 and over, there were 87.4 males.

The median income for a household in the CDP was $35,170, and the median income for a family was $45,547. Males had a median income of $28,047 versus $21,429 for females. The per capita income for the CDP was $16,130. About 8.4% of families and 9.8% of the population were below the poverty line, including 13.3% of those under age 18 and 11.4% of those age 65 or over.
