= Granville, Pennsylvania =

Unincorporated community in Pennsylvania, US

Coordinates: 40°33′13″N 77°37′31″W

- Census-designated place
- Interactive map of Granville, Pennsylvania
- Country: United States
- State: Pennsylvania
- County: Mifflin

Area
  - Total: 1.36 sq mi (3.52 km^{2})
  - Land: 1.36 sq mi (3.52 km^{2})
  - Water: 0 sq mi (0.00 km^{2})

Population (2020)
  - Total: 424
  - Density: 312.0/sq mi (120.48/km^{2})
- Time zone: UTC-5 (Eastern (EST))
  - Summer (DST): UTC-4 (EDT)
- FIPS code: 42-30472

Granville is a census-designated place located in Granville Township, Mifflin County in the state of Pennsylvania, United States. It is located near the Juniata River in south-central Mifflin County. As of the 2010 census, the population was 440 residents.

== Demographics ==
Historical population
Census	Pop.	Note	%±
2020	424		—
U.S. Decennial Census
