= Maitland, Pennsylvania =

Census-designated place in Pennsylvania, United States

- Census-designated place
- Location within Pennsylvania Location within the United States
- Coordinates: 40°37′47″N 77°30′12″W
- Country: United States
- State: Pennsylvania
- County: Mifflin

Area
  - Total: 1.44 sq mi (3.73 km^{2})
  - Land: 1.44 sq mi (3.73 km^{2})
  - Water: 0.0039 sq mi (0.01 km^{2})
- Elevation: 712 ft (217 m)

Population (2020)
  - Total: 323
  - Density: 224.4/sq mi (86.66/km^{2})
- Time zone: UTC-5 (Eastern (EST))
  - Summer (DST): UTC-4 (EDT)
- FIPS code: 42-46728
- GNIS feature ID: 2584483

Maitland is a census-designated place in Derry Township, Mifflin County, Pennsylvania, United States, just outside the borough of Lewistown. At the 2010 census, the population was 357.

== Demographics ==
Historical population
| Census | Pop. | Note | %± |
|---|---|---|---|
| 2020 | 323 | | — |
U.S. Decennial Census
