= Mifflin County, Pennsylvania =

County in Pennsylvania, United States

- County
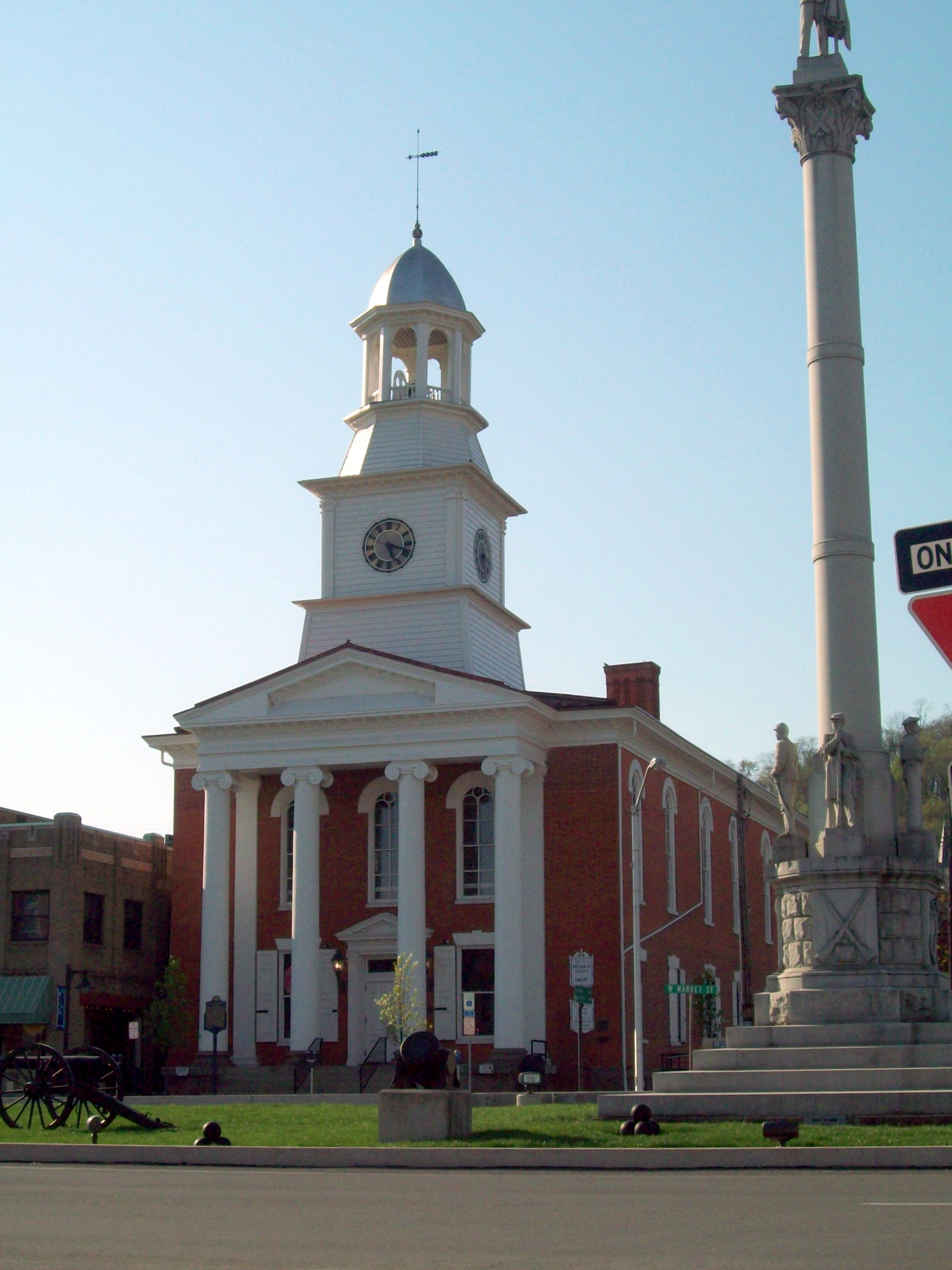
- former Mifflin County Courthouse

- Seal Logo

- Location within the U.S. state of Pennsylvania
- Coordinates: 40°37′N 77°37′W
- Country: United States
- State: Pennsylvania
- Founded: September 19, 1789
- Named for: Thomas Mifflin
- Seat: Lewistown
- Largest borough: Lewistown

Area
  - Total: 415 sq mi (1,070 km^{2})
  - Land: 411 sq mi (1,060 km^{2})
  - Water: 3.7 sq mi (9.6 km^{2}) 0.9%

Population (2020)
  - Total: 46,143
  - Estimate (2025): 46,127 ▼
  - Density: 112.2/sq mi (43.3/km^{2})
- Time zone: UTC−5 (Eastern)
  - Summer (DST): UTC−4 (EDT)
- Congressional district: 13th
- Website: www.mifflincountypa.gov

Mifflin County is a county in the Commonwealth of Pennsylvania. As of the 2020 census, the population was 46,143. Its county seat is Lewistown. The county was created on September 19, 1789, from parts of Cumberland County and Northumberland County. It was named for Thomas Mifflin, the first Governor of Pennsylvania. Mifflin County comprises the Lewistown, PA Micropolitan Statistical Area. The county is part of the Central Pennsylvania region of the state. (Note: Includes Centre, Lycoming, Northumberland, Columbia, Mifflin, Union, Snyder, Clinton, Juniata and Montour Counties)

== Geography ==
The county terrain is formed by the folded Appalachian Mountain ridges which run from southwest to northeast across the county. The terrain slopes to the northeast, with its highest point (Broad Mtn) 1.25 miles (2.01 km) East Northeast from the county's Northwest corner, just south of the county's border with Centre County. It measures 2,339 ft (713 m) Above sea level. The Juniata River flows northeast through the lower part of the county, exiting northeastward into Juniata County near Hawstone. The county has a total area of 415 square miles (1,070 km^{2}), of which 411 square miles (1,060 km^{2}) is land and 3.7 square miles (9.6 km^{2}) (0.9%) is water.

Mifflin County is located in, and has its boundaries defined by, the Ridge-and Valley Appalachian Mountains of Pennsylvania. The county is one of the 423 counties served by the Appalachian Regional Commission, and it is identified as part of the "Midlands" by Colin Woodard in his book American Nations: A History of the Eleven Rival Regional Cultures of North America.

US Route 322, a major divided highway, connects the county to the rest of the state on its route between Harrisburg and State College. US Route 522 also connects the county to the rest of the state on its route between Selinsgrove and Mount Union.

The county has a humid continental climate (Dfa/Dfb) and average temperatures in downtown Lewistown range from 27.8 °F in January to 72.7 °F in July.

=== Adjacent counties ===
- Centre County - north
- Union County - northeast
- Snyder County - east
- Juniata County - south
- Huntingdon County - west

=== Major highways ===
- US 22
- US 22 Bus.
- US 322
- US 522
- PA 103
- PA 305
- PA 333
- PA 655

=== Protected areas ===
- Reeds Gap State Park
- Bald Eagle State Forest (part)
- Rothrock State Forest (part)
- Tuscarora State Forest (part)
- State Game Lands Number 107 (part)
- State Game Lands Number 112B (part)
- White Mountain Wild Area (part of Bald Eagle State Forest)

== Demographics ==
Historical population
Census	Pop.	Note	%±
1790	7,562		—
1800	13,609		80.0%
1810	12,132		−10.9%
1820	16,618		37.0%
1830	21,690		30.5%
1840	13,092		−39.6%
1850	14,980		14.4%
1860	16,340		9.1%
1870	17,508		7.1%
1880	19,577		11.8%
1890	19,996		2.1%
1900	23,160		15.8%
1910	27,785		20.0%
1920	31,439		13.2%
1930	40,335		28.3%
1940	42,993		6.6%
1950	43,691		1.6%
1960	44,348		1.5%
1970	45,268		2.1%
1980	46,908		3.6%
1990	46,197		−1.5%
2000	46,486		0.6%
2010	46,682		0.4%
2020	46,143		−1.2%
2025 (est.)	46,127	▼	0.0%
US Decennial Census:

=== Racial and ethnic composition ===
Mifflin County, Pennsylvania – Racial and ethnic composition Note: the US Census treats Hispanic/Latino as an ethnic category. This table excludes Latinos from the racial categories and assigns them to a separate category. Hispanics/Latinos may be of any race.
Race / Ethnicity (NH = Non-Hispanic)	Pop 1980	Pop 1990	Pop 2000	Pop 2010	Pop 2020	% 1980	% 1990	% 2000	% 2010	% 2020
White alone (NH)	46,601	45,840	45,644	45,199	43,343	99.35%	99.23%	98.19%	96.82%	93.93%
Black or African American alone (NH)	96	97	216	282	350	0.20%	0.21%	0.46%	0.60%	0.76%
Native American or Alaska Native alone (NH)	25	31	34	52	51	0.05%	0.07%	0.07%	0.11%	0.11%
Asian alone (NH)	43	96	135	167	160	0.09%	0.21%	0.29%	0.36%	0.35%
Native Hawaiian or Pacific Islander alone (NH)	x	x	2	6	0	x	x	0.00%	0.01%	0.00%
Other race alone (NH)	21	1	13	26	78	0.04%	0.00%	0.03%	0.06%	0.17%
Mixed race or Multiracial (NH)	x	x	179	416	1,182	x	x	0.39%	0.89%	2.56%
Hispanic or Latino (any race)	122	132	263	534	979	0.26%	0.29%	0.57%	1.14%	2.12%
Total	46,908	46,197	46,486	46,682	46,143	100.00%	100.00%	100.00%	100.00%	100.00%

=== 2020 census ===
As of the 2020 census, the county had a population of 46,143. The median age was 44.0 years. 21.9% of residents were under the age of 18 and 22.1% of residents were 65 years of age or older. For every 100 females there were 96.7 males, and for every 100 females age 18 and over there were 94.5 males age 18 and over.

The racial makeup of the county was 94.6% White, 0.8% Black or African American, 0.1% American Indian and Alaska Native, 0.4% Asian, <0.1% Native Hawaiian and Pacific Islander, 0.8% from some other race, and 3.3% from two or more races. Hispanic or Latino residents of any race comprised 2.1% of the population.

45.5% of residents lived in urban areas, while 54.5% lived in rural areas.

There were 18,823 households in the county, of which 26.0% had children under the age of 18 living in them. Of all households, 49.8% were married-couple households, 17.7% were households with a male householder and no spouse or partner present, and 24.7% were households with a female householder and no spouse or partner present. About 28.8% of all households were made up of individuals and 14.8% had someone living alone who was 65 years of age or older.

There were 21,313 housing units, of which 11.7% were vacant. Among occupied housing units, 71.2% were owner-occupied and 28.8% were renter-occupied. The homeowner vacancy rate was 1.2% and the rental vacancy rate was 7.2%.

=== 2010 census ===
As of the 2010 U.S. census, there were 46,682 people and 18,743 households in the county. The population density was 113.6 people per square mile (43.9 people/km^{2}). There were 21,537 housing units at an average density of 52.4 units per square mile (20.2/km^{2}). The racial makeup of the county was 97.53% White, 0.64% Black or African American, 0.11% Native American, 0.36% Asian, 0.01% Pacific Islander, 0.31% from other races, and 1.03% from two or more races. 1.14% of the population were Hispanic or Latino of any race. 38.8% were of German, 19.2% American, 8.0% Irish and 7.5% English ancestry. 5.7% report speaking Pennsylvania Dutch, Dutch, or German at home.

There were 18,743 households, out of which 29.1% had children under the age of 18 living with them, 57.60% were married couples living together, 8.50% had a female householder with no husband present, and 29.90% were non-families. 26.00% of all households were made up of individuals, and 13.20% had someone living alone who was 65 years of age or older. The average household size was 2.49 and the average family size was 2.99.

The county population contained 23.1% under the age of 18, 2.2% from 18 to 19, 5.1% from 20 to 24, 10.4% from 25 to 34, 20.1% from 35 to 49, 20.6% from 50 to 64, and 18.5% who were 65 years of age or older. The median age was 39 years. The population was 48.93% male, and 51.07% female.

=== Amish community ===
The Amish community in Mifflin County, established in 1791, had a total population of 3,905 people (in 30 congregations) in 2017, or 8.5% of the county's population.

==== Dialect ====
The dominant form of speech in Mifflin County is the Central Pennsylvania accent. Almost everyone in Mifflin County speaks English. The Amish and some Mennonites speak Pennsylvania German, also known as Pennsylvania Dutch, a West Central German dialect, which is quite different from modern Standard German. The Amish and Mennonites can also speak English. Few non-Amish or Mennonites in Mifflin County today speak Pennsylvania German, but this was not true in the past.

== Micropolitan statistical area ==
The United States Office of Management and Budget has designated Mifflin County as the Lewistown, PA micropolitan statistical area (μSA). As of the 2010 United States census the micropolitan area ranked 10th most populous in the State of Pennsylvania and the 237th most populous in the United States with a population of 46,682.

== Law and government ==
United States presidential election results for Mifflin County, Pennsylvania
Year	Republican		Democratic		Third party(ies)	
Year	No.	%	No.	%	No.	%
1888	2,321	51.46%	2,084	46.21%	105	2.33%
1892	2,175	49.82%	2,029	46.47%	162	3.71%
1896	2,662	54.22%	2,052	41.79%	196	3.99%
1900	2,594	56.48%	1,842	40.10%	157	3.42%
1904	3,054	66.10%	1,378	29.83%	188	4.07%
1908	2,902	59.39%	1,799	36.82%	185	3.79%
1912	654	14.60%	1,400	31.25%	2,426	54.15%
1916	2,105	47.37%	1,965	44.22%	374	8.42%
1920	3,872	58.93%	2,400	36.52%	299	4.55%
1924	4,780	66.92%	1,999	27.99%	364	5.10%
1928	8,932	86.97%	1,270	12.37%	68	0.66%
1932	5,525	58.95%	3,654	38.99%	193	2.06%
1936	6,867	41.56%	9,581	57.98%	77	0.47%
1940	6,352	47.48%	6,993	52.27%	34	0.25%
1944	6,205	51.92%	5,693	47.63%	54	0.45%
1948	5,666	53.84%	4,762	45.25%	95	0.90%
1952	8,620	59.22%	5,889	40.46%	47	0.32%
1956	8,638	62.94%	5,078	37.00%	9	0.07%
1960	10,315	67.85%	4,816	31.68%	72	0.47%
1964	6,006	40.43%	8,811	59.31%	39	0.26%
1968	8,133	55.33%	5,681	38.65%	884	6.01%
1972	9,989	72.10%	3,667	26.47%	199	1.44%
1976	7,698	54.56%	6,210	44.01%	201	1.42%
1980	7,541	55.78%	5,226	38.65%	753	5.57%
1984	9,106	63.35%	5,178	36.03%	89	0.62%
1988	8,170	62.49%	4,790	36.63%	115	0.88%
1992	6,300	42.89%	4,946	33.67%	3,442	23.43%
1996	6,888	50.21%	5,327	38.83%	1,503	10.96%
2000	9,400	64.32%	4,835	33.08%	379	2.59%
2004	11,726	69.79%	4,889	29.10%	187	1.11%
2008	10,929	65.89%	5,375	32.40%	283	1.71%
2012	11,939	72.73%	4,273	26.03%	204	1.24%
2016	14,094	75.28%	3,877	20.71%	750	4.01%
2020	16,670	77.37%	4,603	21.36%	274	1.27%
2024	17,184	77.69%	4,735	21.41%	201	0.91%

Pennsylvania Gubernatorial election results for Mifflin County
Year	Republican		Democratic		Third party(ies)	
Year	No.	%	No.	%	No.	%
1970	5,909	51.28%	5,250	45.57%	363	3.15%
1974	4,793	43.95%	6,023	55.23%	89	0.82%
1978	6,266	58.21%	4,406	40.93%	92	0.85%
1982	6,391	55.60%	4,948	43.05%	155	1.35%
1986	5,788	54.78%	4,683	44.32%	95	0.90%
1990	2,781	30.06%	6,472	69.94%	0	0.00%
1994	6,140	53.47%	4,068	35.42%	1,276	11.11%
1998	6,914	71.01%	2,010	20.65%	812	8.34%
2002	7,122	66.35%	3,362	31.32%	250	2.33%
2006	7,642	61.77%	4,730	38.23%	0	0.00%
2010	9,642	78.85%	2,587	21.15%	0	0.00%
2014	7,318	67.70%	3,492	32.30%	0	0.00%
2018	9,408	68.45%	4,127	30.03%	210	1.53%
2022	11,460	68.02%	5,119	30.39%	268	1.59%

=== County commissioners ===
- Rob Postal (R)
- Noah Wise (R)
- Kevin Kodish (D)

=== County auditors ===
- Helen Kirk (R)
- Barbara Clemmons (R)
- Kendra Dunmire (D)

=== Other county officers ===
- District Attorney: Christopher Torquato (R)
- Sheriff: James Aumiller (Acting)
- Treasurer: Diane Griffith (R)
- Register & Recorder: Ellen Amspacker (R)
- Coroner: Andrea Alcalde (R)
- Prothonotary: Tammy Stuck (R)

=== State representatives ===
- David H. Rowe, Republican, Pennsylvania's 85th House district
- Kerry A. Benninghoff, Republican, Pennsylvania's 171st House district

(as of January 2023)

=== State senator ===
- Judy Ward, Republican, Pennsylvania's 30th senatorial district

(as of January 2023)

=== United States representative ===
- John Joyce, Republican, Pennsylvania's 13th congressional district

=== United States senators ===
- John Fetterman, Democrat
- Dave McCormick, Republican

Mifflin County voters have been reliably Republican. In only one national election since 1940 has the county selected the Democratic Party candidate.

United States Senate election results for Mifflin County, Pennsylvania1
Year	Republican		Democratic		Third party(ies)	
Year	No.	%	No.	%	No.	%
1994	6,188	56.74%	4,378	40.14%	340	3.12%
2000	9,768	69.32%	4,021	28.54%	302	2.14%
2006	7,097	57.49%	5,247	42.51%	0	0.00%
2012	11,099	68.08%	4,937	30.28%	268	1.64%
2018	9,564	69.55%	3,934	28.61%	254	1.85%
2024	16,413	74.79%	4,991	22.74%	542	2.47%

United States Senate election results for Mifflin County, Pennsylvania3
Year	Republican		Democratic		Third party(ies)	
Year	No.	%	No.	%	No.	%
1992	7,280	51.55%	6,077	43.03%	765	5.42%
1998	6,611	70.43%	2,499	26.62%	276	2.94%
2004	11,345	69.52%	3,973	24.35%	1,000	6.13%
2010	9,182	75.53%	2,975	24.47%	0	0.00%
2016	13,089	71.87%	4,031	22.13%	1,093	6.00%
2022	12,263	73.06%	3,965	23.62%	557	3.32%

== Economy ==
Major employers in Mifflin County include:

- Asher’s Chocolates
- First Quality
- Geisinger Health
- Giant Food
- Jarden Plastics
- Lowe’s
- Marlette Homes
- Mifflin County School District
- Overhead Door Corporation
- Philips
- Standard Steel
- Trinity Packaging
- Walmart

== Education ==
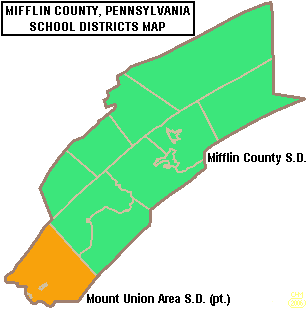
Map of Mifflin County Pennsylvania Public School Districts

=== Public school districts ===
Most of the county is served by the Mifflin County School District, with the exception of Wayne Township and the boroughs of Newton-Hamilton and Kistler, which are part of the Mount Union Area School District.

- Mifflin County School District
- Mount Union Area School District (also in Huntingdon County)

=== Head Start preschool programs ===
Head Start is a federally and state funded preschool program for low income children. The program serves 3- and 4-year-olds. In order to participate the family income must be below federal poverty guidelines.

- Coleman Head Start Center
- McVeytown Head Start Center

=== Private schools ===
- Sacred Heart provides a private, Catholic education from kindergarten through fifth grade.
- Belleville Mennonite School, Beth-El Christian Day School, and Valley View Christian School provide Mennonite education through grade twelve.
- Mifflin County Christian Academy located in Decatur Township provides Christian education from kindergarten through grade twelve as well as day care.
- Several Old Order Amish schools provide education through grade eight.

=== Colleges and universities ===
Mifflin County Academy of Science and Technology located in Lewistown provides post high school degrees in nursing, auto mechanics and electrical services and other technology driven careers.

The Lewistown branch of the South Hills School of Business and Technology offers associate degrees and other certifications in various areas of business, technology, and some health care. (Closed 2019)

The Penn State Learning Center in Lewistown offers both two-year and four-year degrees. Recently, the Learning Center opened a state-of-the-art science lab to be used by students attending the Lewistown Hospital School of Nursing.

== Media ==
=== Radio stations ===
==== AM ====
- WLUI 670 AM- Lewistown (simulcast on W225CK, 92.9 FM)
- WKVA 920 AM- Lewistown (simulcast on W262DO, 100.3 FM)

==== FM ====
- WRYV 88.7- Milroy
- WJRC 90.9- Lewistown
- WMRF 95.7- Lewistown
- WVNW 96.7- Burnham
- WCHX 105.5- Burnham

=== Television ===
Mifflin County does not have a local television station but it is provided with local coverage from the following stations outside of the county from both the Harrisburg and Johnstown/Altoona markets:

- WHTM 27 Harrisburg (27.1 ABC, 27.2 ION, 27.3 GetTV, 27.4 Laff)
- WPMT 43 York (43.1 FOX, 43.2 AntennaTV)
- WHP 21 Harrisburg (21.1 CBS, 21.2 MyNetworkTV, 21.3 CW)
- WGAL 8 Lancaster (8.1 NBC, 8.2 MeTV)
- WTAJ 10 Altoona (10.1 CBS, 10.2 Escape, 10.3 Laff, 10.4 Grit)
- WJAC 6 Johnstown (6.1 NBC, 6.2 MeTV, 6.3 Comet, 6.4 CW)
- WATM 23 Altoona (23.1 ABC, 23.2 FOX, 23.3 ThisTV, 23.4 AntennaTV)
- WWCP 8 Johnstown (8.1 FOX, 8.2 ABC)
- WHVL 29 State College (29.1 MyNetworkTV, 29.2 Buzzr)

=== Newspapers ===
- Lewistown Sentinel
- County Observer
- The Valley Newspaper

== Communities ==
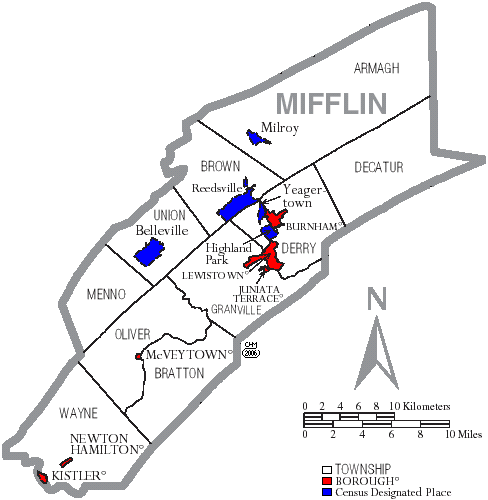
Mifflin County, showing Boroughs (red), Townships (white), and Census-designated places (blue).

Under Pennsylvania law, there are four types of incorporated municipalities: cities, boroughs, townships, and, in at most two cases, towns.

=== Boroughs ===
- Burnham
- Juniata Terrace
- Kistler
- Lewistown (county seat)
- McVeytown
- Newton Hamilton

=== Census-designated places and unincorporated communities ===
Census-designated places are geographical areas designated by the US Census Bureau for the purpose of compiling demographic data. They are not actual jurisdictions under Pennsylvania law. Other unincorporated communities are listed here as well.

- Alfarata
- Allensville
- Anderson
- Atkinson Mills
- Barrville
- Belleville
- Belltown
- Cedar Crest
- Church Hill
- Granville
- Hawstone
- Highland Park
- Little Kansas
- Longfellow
- Lumber City
- Maitland
- Mattawana
- Menno
- Milroy
- Naginey
- Potlicker Flats
- Reedsville
- Ryde
- Shindle
- Siglerville
- Strodes Mills
- Union Mills
- Wagner
- Woodland
- Yeagertown

=== Townships ===
- Armagh
- Bratton
- Brown
- Decatur
- Derry
- Granville
- Menno
- Oliver
- Union
- Wayne

=== Population ranking ===
The population ranking of the following table is based on the 2010 census of Mifflin County.

† county seat

Rank	City/Town/etc.	Municipal type	Population (2010 Census)
1	† Lewistown	Borough	8,338
2	Burnham	Borough	2,054
3	Belleville	CDP	1,827
4	Church Hill	CDP	1,627
5	Milroy	CDP	1,498
6	Highland Park	CDP	1,380
7	Yeagertown	CDP	1,050
8	Strodes Mills	CDP	757
9	Reedsville	CDP	641
10	Juniata Terrace	Borough	542
11	Allensville	CDP	503
12	Granville	CDP	440
13	Maitland	CDP	357
14	McVeytown	Borough	342
15	Kistler	Borough	320
16	Mattawana	CDP	276
17	Lumber City	CDP	255
18	Longfellow	CDP	215
19	Newton Hamilton	Borough	205
20	Cedar Crest	CDP	195
21	Atkinson Mills	CDP	174
22	Potlicker Flats	CDP	172
23	Barrville	CDP	160
24	Alfarata	CDP	149
25	Wagner	CDP	128
26	Siglerville	CDP	106

== See also ==
- National Register of Historic Places listings in Mifflin County, Pennsylvania
