= Barrville, Pennsylvania =

Unincorporated community in Pennsylvania, US

Coordinates: 40°39′47″N 77°40′35″W

- Census-designated place
- Interactive map of Barrville, Pennsylvania
- Country: United States
- State: Pennsylvania
- County: Mifflin

Area
  - Total: 0.71 sq mi (1.83 km^{2})
  - Land: 0.70 sq mi (1.82 km^{2})
  - Water: 0 sq mi (0.00 km^{2})

Population (2020)
  - Total: 179
  - Density: 254.1/sq mi (98.11/km^{2})
- Time zone: UTC-5 (Eastern (EST))
  - Summer (DST): UTC-4 (EDT)
- FIPS code: 42-04344

Barrville is a census-designated place located in Brown Township, Mifflin County in the state of Pennsylvania, United States. As of the 2020 census, Barrville had a population of 179.

== Demographics ==
Historical population
Census	Pop.	Note	%±
2020	179		—
U.S. Decennial Census
