= Wayne Township, Mifflin County, Pennsylvania =

Township in Pennsylvania, US

Coordinates: 40°22′29″N 77°48′59″W

- Township
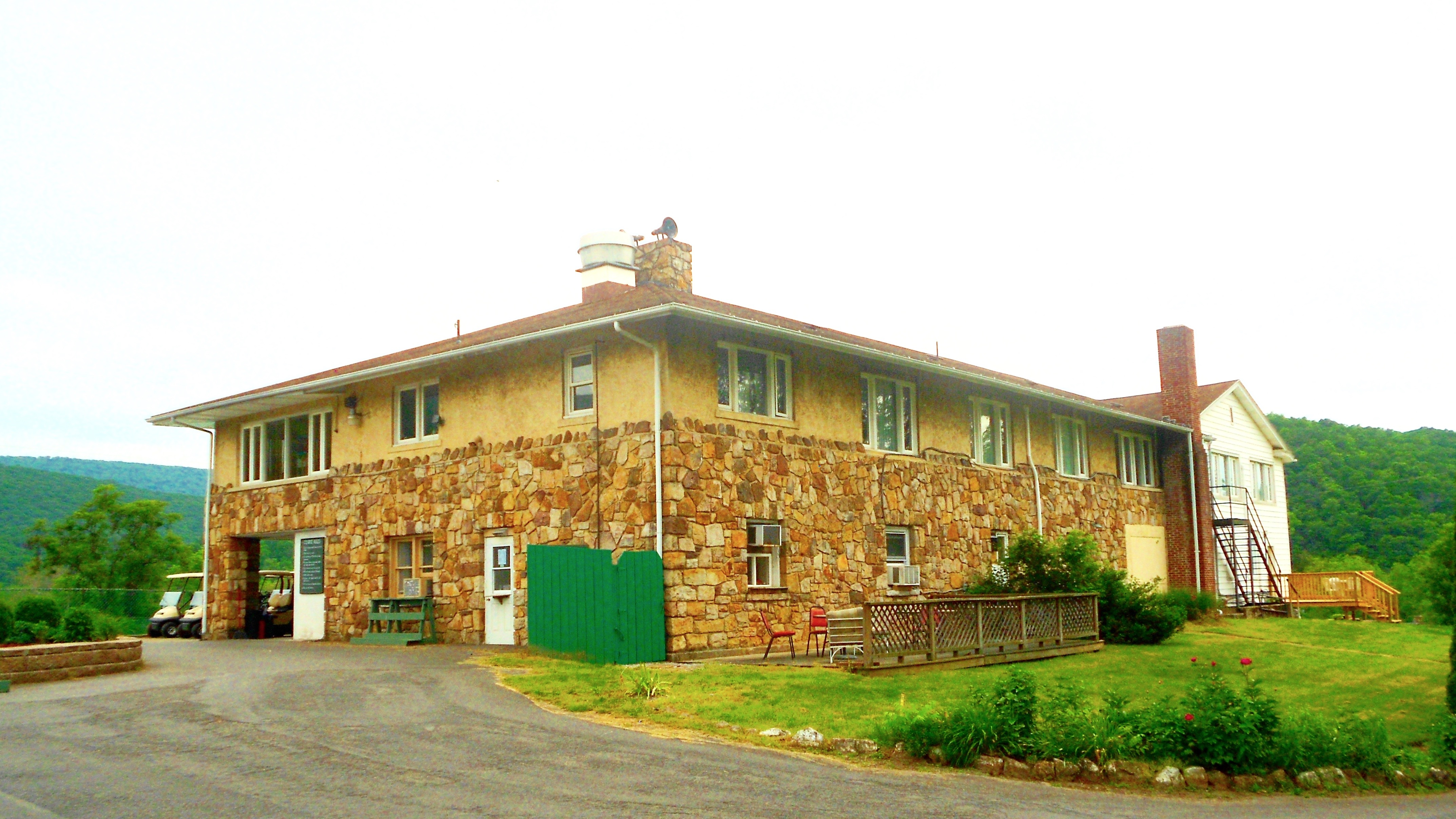
- American Legion Country Club

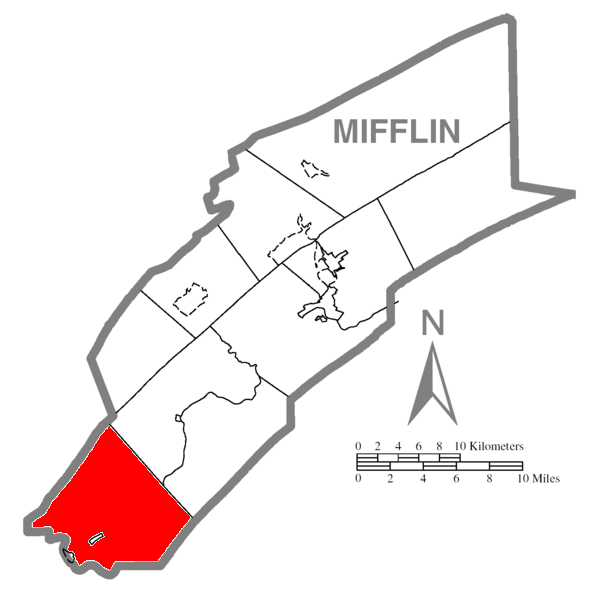
- Map of Mifflin County, Pennsylvania highlighting Wayne Township

- Map of Mifflin County, Pennsylvania
- Country: United States
- State: Pennsylvania
- County: Mifflin
- Settled: 1755
- Incorporated: 1782

Government
  - Type: Board of Supervisors
  - Chairman: Theodore Reed
  - Vice-chairman: Dwight Aurand
  - Supervisor: Donald Gearhart

Area
  - Total: 49.55 sq mi (128.33 km^{2})
  - Land: 48.67 sq mi (126.06 km^{2})
  - Water: 0.88 sq mi (2.27 km^{2})

Population (2020)
  - Total: 2,362 ▼
  - Estimate (2022): 2,351
  - Density: 51.9/sq mi (20.05/km^{2})
- Time zone: UTC-5 (Eastern (EST))
  - Summer (DST): UTC-4 (EDT)
- Zip code: 17051, 17066, 17075
- Area codes: 717, 814
- FIPS code: 42-087-81784
- Website: Wayne Township
- Local phone exchanges: 542, 543, 899

Wayne Township is a township in Mifflin County, Pennsylvania, United States. The population was 2,362 at the time of the 2020 census.

== Geography ==
According to the United States Census Bureau, the township has a total area of 49.8 square miles (129.0 km^{2}), of which 49.1 square miles (127.1 km^{2}) is land and 0.8 square mile (1.9 km^{2}) (1.51%) is water. It contains the census-designated places of Atkinson Mills and Cedar Crest.

== Demographics ==
Historical population
Census	Pop.	Note	%±
2010	2,550		—
2020	2,362		−7.4%
2022 (est.)	2,351		−0.5%
U.S. Decennial Census

As of the census of 2000, there were 2,414 people, 944 households, and 708 families residing in the township.

The population density was 49.2 inhabitants per square mile (19.0/km^{2}). There were 1,230 housing units at an average density of 25.1/sq mi (9.7/km^{2}).

The racial makeup of the township was 99.21% White, 0.33% African American, 0.08% Asian, 0.25% from other races, and 0.12% from two or more races. Hispanic or Latino of any race were 0.54% of the population.

There were 944 households, out of which 29.1% had children under the age of eighteen living with them; 62.2% were married couples living together, 7.4% had a female householder with no husband present, and 25.0% were non-families. 20.8% of all households were made up of individuals, and 11.3% had someone living alone who was sixty-five years of age or older.

The average household size was 2.51 and the average family size was 2.85.

In the township the population was spread out, with 23.1% under the age of eighteen, 6.9% from eighteen to twenty-four, 27.2% from twenty-five to forty-four, 26.1% from forty-five to sixty-four, and 16.7% who were sixty-five years of age or older. The median age was forty years.

For every one hundred females, there were 96.1 males. For every one hundred females who were aged eighteen or older, there were 95.9 males.

The median income for a household in the township was $33,750, and the median income for a family was $37,695. Males had a median income of $29,800 compared with that of $19,214 for females.

The per capita income for the township was $15,537.

Roughly 9.0% of families and 11.7% of the population were living below the poverty line, including 11.8% of those who were under the age of eighteen and 15.8% of those who were aged sixty-five or older.

== Notable person ==
- James Holliday, lawyer
