= Cedar Crest, Pennsylvania =

Unincorporated community in Pennsylvania, US

Coordinates: 40°23′47″N 77°53′08″W

- Census-designated place
- Lucy Furnace
- Interactive map of Cedar Crest, Pennsylvania
- Country: United States
- State: Pennsylvania
- County: Mifflin

Area
  - Total: 0.22 sq mi (0.56 km^{2})
  - Land: 0.22 sq mi (0.56 km^{2})
  - Water: 0 sq mi (0.00 km^{2})

Population (2020)
  - Total: 157
  - Density: 722/sq mi (278.8/km^{2})
- Time zone: UTC-5 (Eastern (EST))
  - Summer (DST): UTC-4 (EDT)
- FIPS code: 42-11836

Cedar Crest is a census-designated place located in Wayne Township, Mifflin County in the state of Pennsylvania, United States. It is located very close to the borough of Mount Union, along US 22. As of the 2010 census, the population was 195 residents.

== Demographics ==
Historical population
Census	Pop.	Note	%±
2020	157		—
U.S. Decennial Census
