= Alfarata, Pennsylvania =

Unincorporated community in Pennsylvania, US

- Census-designated place
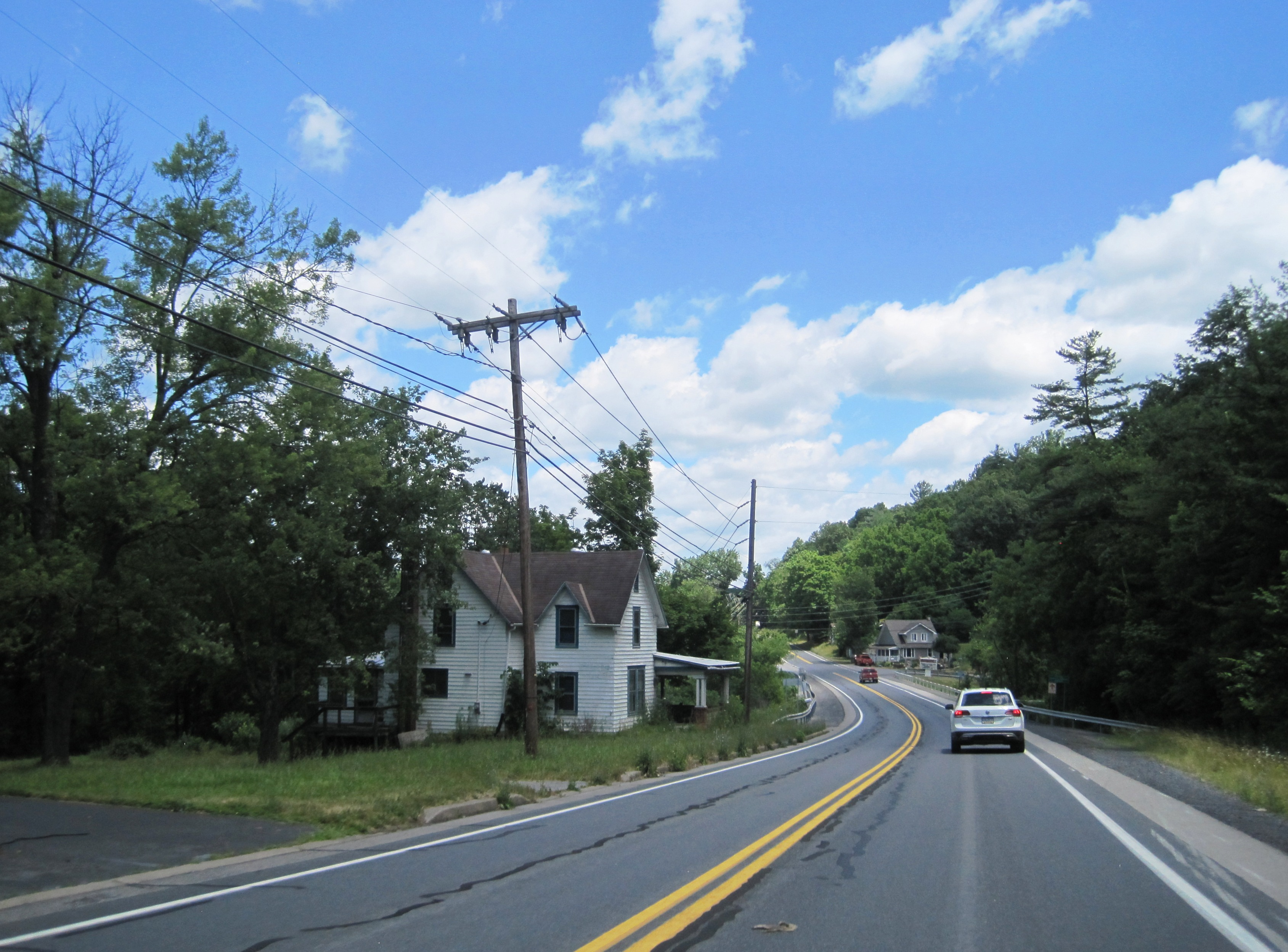
- US 522 northbound in Alfarata

- Location within Pennsylvania Location within the United States
- Coordinates: 40°39′45″N 77°27′24″W
- Country: United States
- State: Pennsylvania
- County: Mifflin

Area
  - Total: 0.56 sq mi (1.45 km^{2})
  - Land: 0.56 sq mi (1.45 km^{2})
  - Water: 0 sq mi (0.00 km^{2})

Population (2020)
  - Total: 154
  - Density: 275.5/sq mi (106.37/km^{2})
- Time zone: UTC-5 (Eastern (EST))
  - Summer (DST): UTC-4 (EDT)
- FIPS code: 42-00764

Alfarata is a census-designated place located in Decatur Township, Mifflin County in the state of Pennsylvania, United States. It is located along U.S. Route 522 in eastern Mifflin County. As of the 2020 census, Alfarata had a population of 154. The community was named for the Indian girl Alfarata from the song "The Blue Juniata".

== Demographics ==
Historical population
Census	Pop.	Note	%±
2020	154		—
U.S. Decennial Census
