= Siglerville, Pennsylvania =

Unincorporated community in Pennsylvania, US

Coordinates: 40°44′22″N 77°31′56″W

- Census-designated place
- Interactive map of Siglerville, Pennsylvania
- Country: United States
- State: Pennsylvania
- County: Mifflin

Population (2010)
  - Total: 106
- Time zone: UTC-5 (Eastern (EST))
  - Summer (DST): UTC-4 (EDT)

Siglerville is a census-designated place located in central Armagh Township, Mifflin County in the state of Pennsylvania, United States. It is located just to the southwest of Bald Eagle State Forest. As of the 2010 census, the population was 109 residents.

In 2023, the population of Siglerville was 191, with the median age being 59.5 years. The demographic of Siglerville is uniform, with 100% of its population being white (of non-Hispanic origin), 100% of its population being legal U.S. citizens, and 0% of its population speaking a language other than English within households.
