= Newton Hamilton, Pennsylvania =

Borough in Pennsylvania, US

- Borough
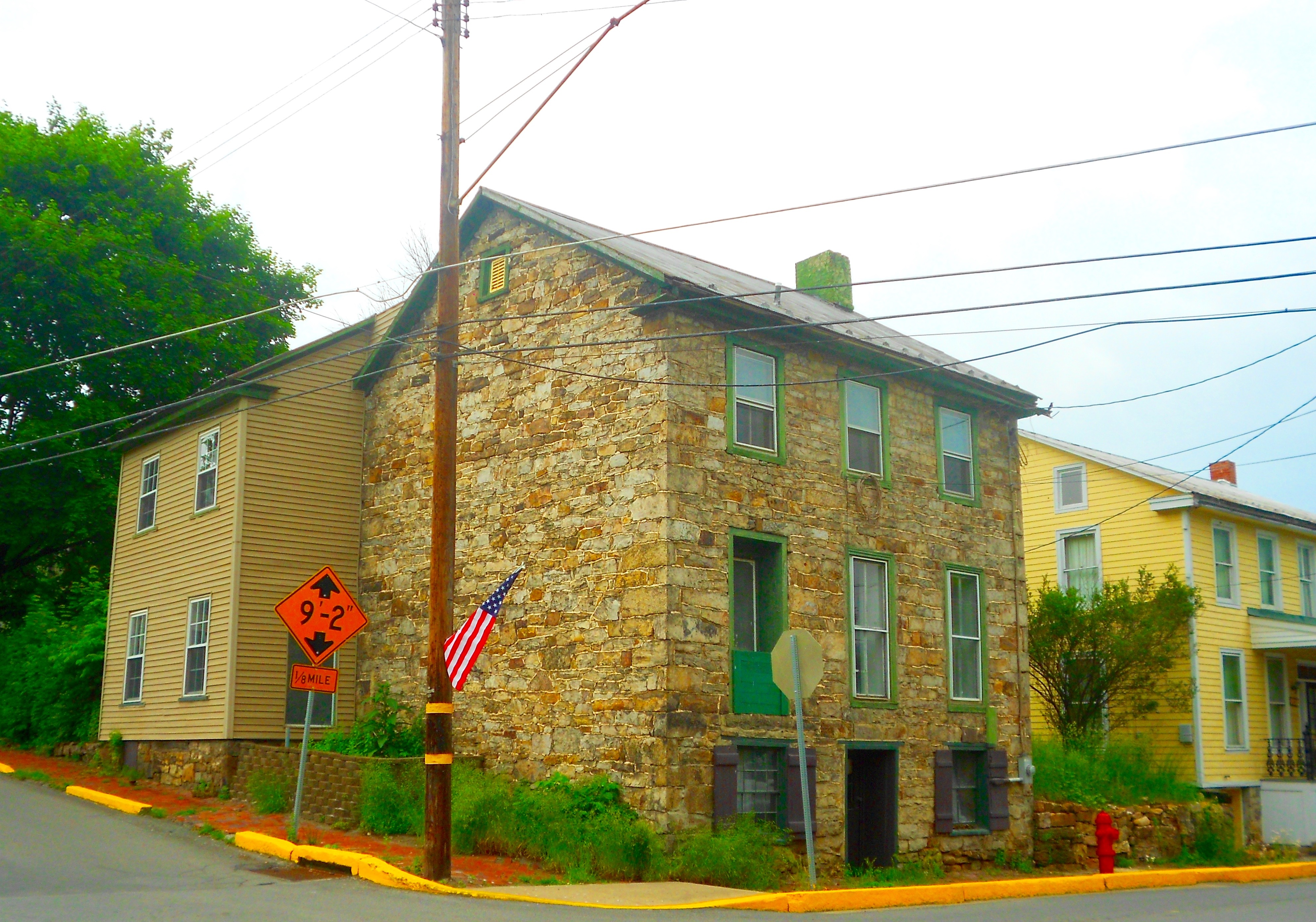
- House on Water Street

- Location of Newton Hamilton in Mifflin County, Pennsylvania.

- Location within Pennsylvania Location within the United States
- Coordinates: 40°23′34″N 77°50′06″W
- Country: United States
- State: Pennsylvania
- County: Mifflin
- Settled: 1802
- Incorporated: 1843

Government
  - Type: Borough Council
  - Mayor: Thomas White
  - Council President: Patrick Kyler
  - Council Vice President: Justin Creitz

Area
  - Total: 0.19 sq mi (0.48 km^{2})
  - Land: 0.15 sq mi (0.40 km^{2})
  - Water: 0.031 sq mi (0.08 km^{2})

Population (2020)
  - Total: 196
  - Density: 1,265.2/sq mi (488.48/km^{2})
- Time zone: UTC-5 (Eastern (EST))
  - Summer (DST): UTC-4 (EDT)
- Zip code: 17075
- Area code: 814
- FIPS code: 42-54160
- Local phone exchanges: 542, 543

Newton Hamilton is a borough (established April 12, 1843) in Mifflin County, Pennsylvania, United States. The population was 197 at the time of the 2020 census.

== History ==
On June 15, 1762, Hugh Brown obtained a warrant for two hundred and fifty acres of land, a portion of which would later become known as the borough of Newton Hamilton. Sometime before 1783, Brown was killed during an encounter with Indigenous peoples in the area. During the resolution of Brown's estate, that land was inherited by Margaret Hamilton, according to 18th-century land ownership and assessment documents in Pennsylvania's Juniata and Susquehanna Valley region, which show that Hamilton's land holdings were assessed at sixty acres in 1783. Hamilton subsequently sold "lots 28-29 'in the general plan of Newton Hamilton' to Samuel McCurdy on January 19, 1802," according to historian Franklin Ellis, who also noted that the town of Newton Hamilton "was laid out under its present name about 1802" by Margaret Hamilton, who "lived and died there." Those plots of land were described in records of the period as having been fifty by one hundred and fifty feet, and were situated on what is, today, the north side of the borough's Front Street.

Hamilton then sold lots fifty-seven and fifty-eight to James Irvine on April 18, 1803. Sixty by one hundred and thirty feet each, those lots were located on what is, today, the south side of Newton Hamilton's Second Street.

When Catharine (McAneer) Murfin relocated with her parents to Newton Hamilton in 1826, the hamlet was composed of just seven log homes, which were owned by wheelwright Acquilla Burchfield, John McGeehan, John Murray, John Shafer, and others.

In February and October 1828, respectively, Patrick and James Moffit bought land in Newton Hamilton and "lived in a plastered house by the spring," according to Ellis. That land later became the land on which "the Sigler mansion" was located. That same year, Elijah Davis opened a store.

By this time in the hamlet's history, surveyors for Pennsylvania's growing canal system had surveyed the area in preparation for establishing new canal routes and stops, which helped to fuel further land sales. John Postlethwait then opened and began operating a tavern in 1829, which later became known as the Logan House, and which was followed by the store openings of Robert Thompson & Co. and Richard A. McDowel & Co.

By 1830, the town also had a school, which was operated by Samuel Cross in a house adjacent to the land that would become the site of the Sigler mansion. Within six years, the town had grown to include the following residents and workers:

- Boat builder: Robert M. Davidson;
- Carriage and wagonmakers: John Coulter, Charles H. Knox, Joseph Laughlin, Benjamin Norton;
- Carpenters: Lewis Barnard, Samuel A. Corbett, Jacob Hesser, Nathan Jones, William McAnear, Robert A. McDowell, Joseph and Samuel D. Postlethwait, Thomas J. Postlethwait Jr., Alfred Walker;
- Gentlemen: Jonathan J. Cumming, John C. Purcell;
- Saddlers: Alexander Cumming, Thomas Galbraith, George Guss;
- Shinglemakers: Thomas Baird, William Harvey;
- Tailors: Casper Bucher, Burr L. Buckley, Robert Witherow; and
- Teachers: James and Walter Galbraith, Winchester McCarthy, and William Uttley.

On March 24, 1838, civic officials in Wayne Township bought James Irvine's tracts of land that had been purchased from Margaret Hamilton in 1803. They then oversaw the construction of a new stone schoolhouse.

From 1840 to 1884, John Morrison served as the town's justice of the peace. Morrison had been one of the community's early settlers, having arrived in 1829. It was during this period that Newton Hamilton separated itself from the township in order to become an "independent district" in 1844. By 1845, multiple blacksmiths and boatmen were residing in the community while working nearby, John Sigler was operating a tannery plant and John Lowry and Riley J. Richards were engaged in cabinet making while merchants operating businesses here included John Bolsbach, James D. and Samuel Morrison, James North, and Joseph C. Seckler. The physicians practicing here were A. J. Akinson, M.D. and Charles Bower, M.D.

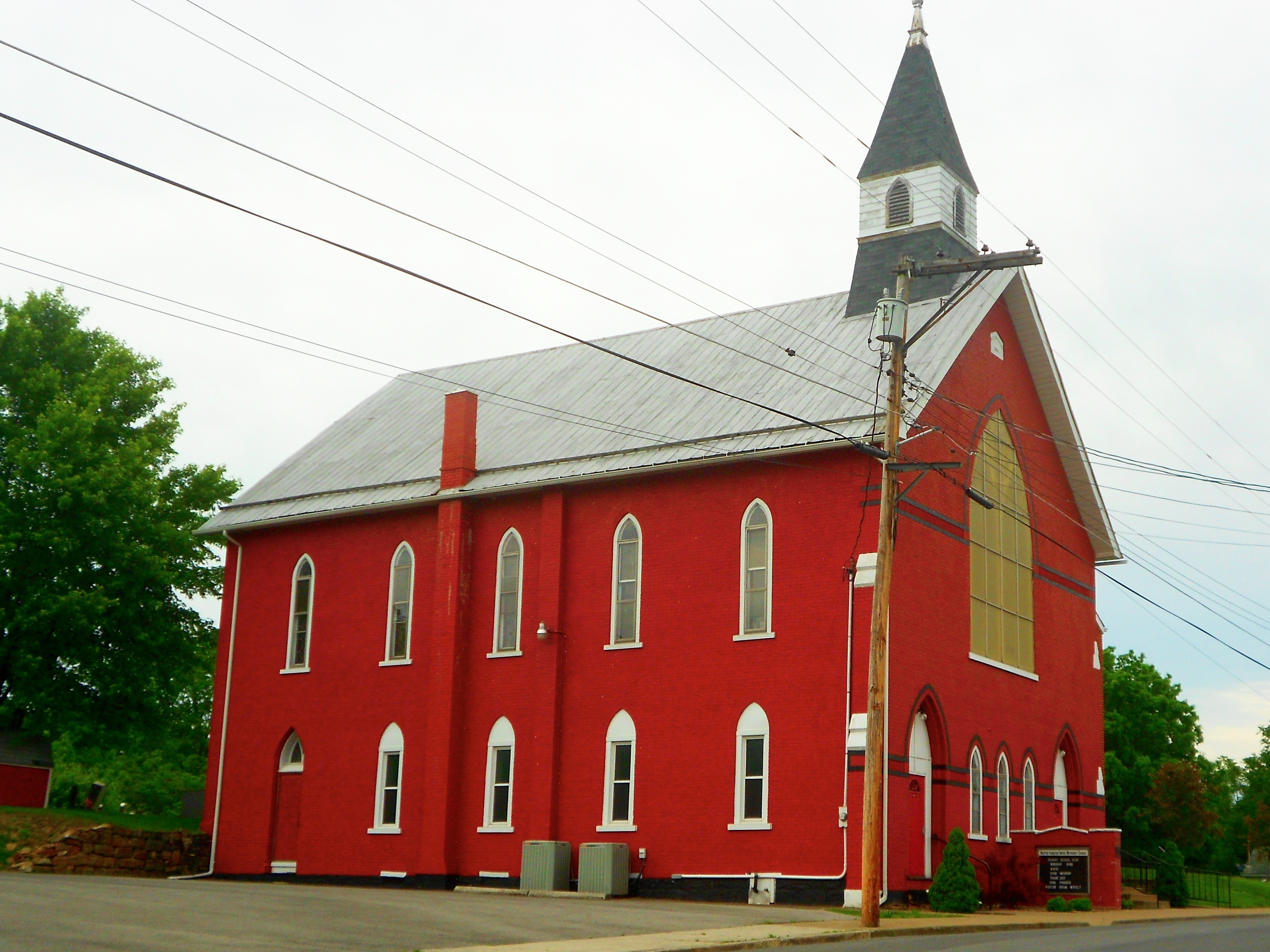
Methodist church built 1881

From 1850 to 1877, John Smelker opened and operated a second tannery. As the town continued to grow during this period, it also attracted an increasing number of visitors. In response, John B. Miller purchased land and then erected a hotel in June 1867. That establishment later became known as the Everett House. Around this same time, a new bridge was erected to facilitate carriage and wagon travel across the river. Destroyed during a flood on October 8, 1880, it was rebuilt at a cost of $14,895 by G. W. Keiffer of Sunbury, Pennsylvania and completed on February 11, 1881.

== Geography ==
Newton Hamilton is located at 40°23′34″N 77°50′6″W (40.392831, −77.835081).

According to the United States Census Bureau, the borough has a total area of 0.2 square miles (0.52 km^{2}), of which 0.2 square miles (0.52 km^{2}) is land and 0.04 square miles (0.10 km^{2}) (10.53%) is water.

== Demographics ==
Historical population
Census	Pop.	Note	%±
1850	353		—
1860	306		−13.3%
1870	350		14.4%
1880	317		−9.4%
1890	333		5.0%
1900	384		15.3%
1910	340		−11.5%
1920	400		17.6%
1930	348		−13.0%
1940	395		13.5%
1950	397		0.5%
1960	338		−14.9%
1970	280		−17.2%
1980	317		13.2%
1990	287		−9.5%
2000	272		−5.2%
2010	205		−24.6%
2020	196		−4.4%
2021 (est.)	196	Steady	0.0%

As of the census of 2000, there were 272 people, 99 households, and 79 families residing in the borough.

The population density was 1,624.1 people per square mile (627.1 people/km^{2}). There were 114 housing units at an average density of 680.7 per square mile (262.8/km^{2}).

The racial makeup of the borough was 98.90% White, 0.37% from other races, and 0.74% from two or more races. Hispanic or Latino of any race were 0.37% of the population.

There were 99 households, out of which 43.4% had children under the age of eighteen living with them, 60.6% were married couples living together, 11.1% had a female householder with no husband present, and 20.2% were non-families. 18.2% of all households were made up of individuals, and 11.1% had someone living alone who was sixty-five years of age or older.

The average household size was 2.75 and the average family size was 3.04.

In the borough the population was spread out, with 30.5% under the age of eighteen, 8.8% from eighteen to twenty-four, 27.6% from twenty-five to forty-four, 21.3% from forty-five to sixty-four, and 11.8% who were sixty-five years of age or older. The median age was thirty-two years.

For every one hundred females there were 88.9 males. For every one hundred females aged eighteen and over, there were 90.9 males.

The median income for a household in the borough was $30,357, and the median income for a family was $32,500. Males had a median income of $29,286 versus $25,625 for females.

The per capita income for the borough was $11,584.

Roughly 6.0% of families and 8.1% of the population were living below the poverty line, including 24.2% of those sixty-five or over. None of those in poverty were under the age of eighteen.
