= Bratton Township, Pennsylvania =

Township in Pennsylvania, US

Coordinates: 40°28′00″N 77°40′59″W

- Township
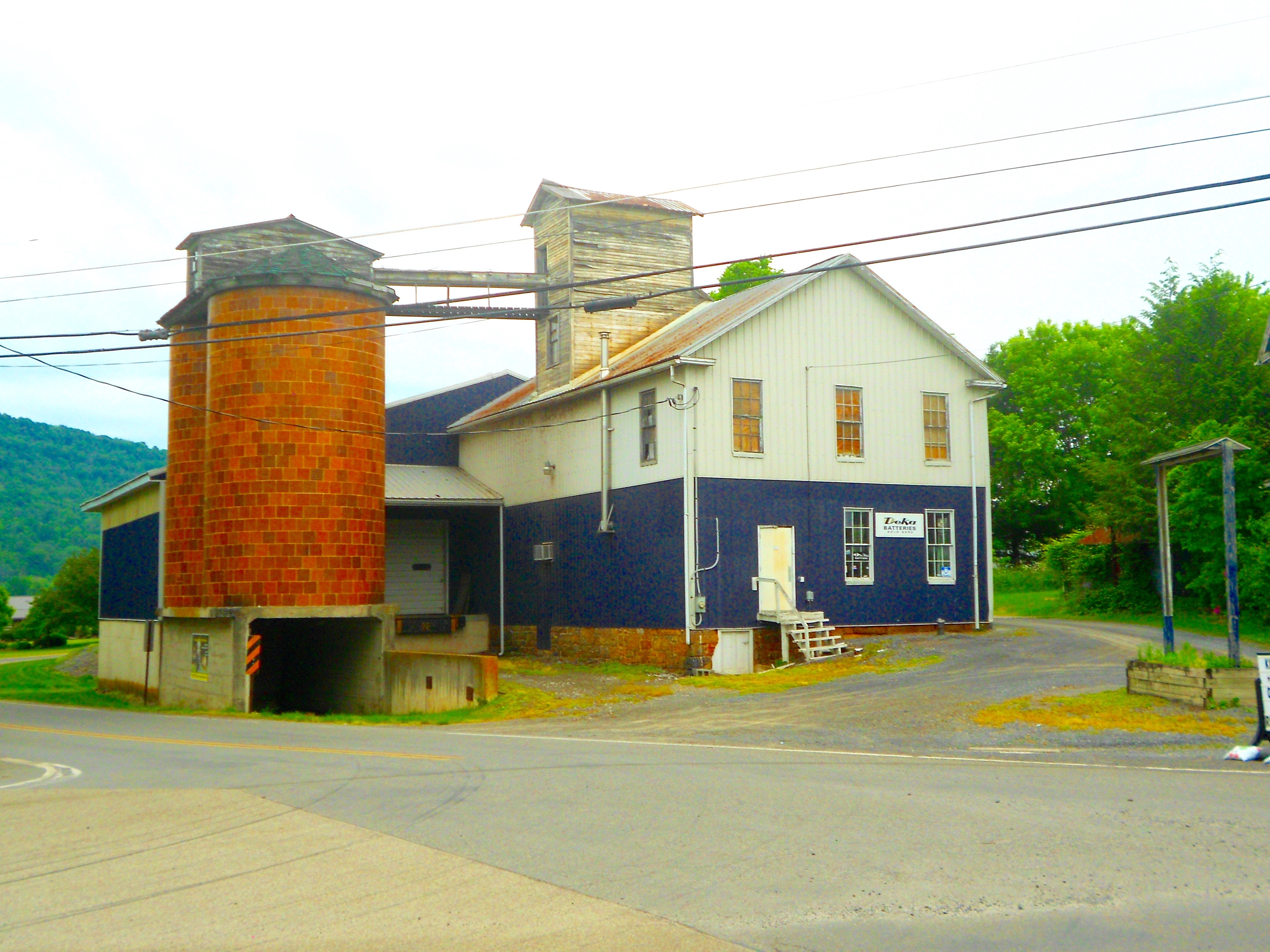
- Feed mill in Mattawana

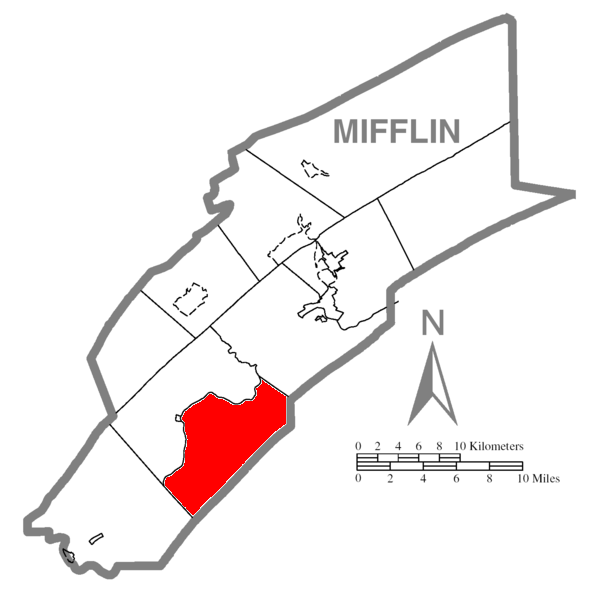
- Map of Mifflin County, Pennsylvania highlighting Bratton Township

- Map of Mifflin County, Pennsylvania
- Country: United States
- State: Pennsylvania
- County: Mifflin
- Settled: 1766
- Incorporated: 1850

Government
  - Type: Board of Supervisors
  - Chairman: Jeffrey Ranck
  - Vice Chairman: Stanley Collins
  - Supervisor: John Cunningham

Area
  - Total: 33.25 sq mi (86.12 km^{2})
  - Land: 32.78 sq mi (84.91 km^{2})
  - Water: 0.46 sq mi (1.20 km^{2})

Population (2020)
  - Total: 1,192 ▼
  - Estimate (2022): 1,184
  - Density: 39.4/sq mi (15.23/km^{2})
- Time zone: UTC-5 (Eastern (EST))
  - Summer (DST): UTC-4 (EDT)
- Zip code: 17051
- Area code: 717
- FIPS code: 42-087-08304
- Website: www.brattontownship.com
- Local phone exchange: 899

Bratton Township is a township in Mifflin County, Pennsylvania, United States. The population was 1,192 at the 2020 census.

== Geography ==
According to the United States Census Bureau, the township has a total area of 33.3 square miles (86 km^{2}), of which 32.8 square miles (85 km^{2}) is land and 0.5 square miles (1.3 km^{2}) (1.56%) is water. It contains the census-designated places of Longfellow and Mattawana.

== Demographics ==
Historical population
Census	Pop.	Note	%±
2010	1,317		—
2020	1,192		−9.5%
2022 (est.)	1,184		−0.7%
U.S. Decennial Census

As of the 2000 census, there were 1,259 people, 482 households, and 369 families residing in the township. The population density was 38.4 inhabitants per square mile (14.8/km^{2}). There were 605 housing units at an average density of 18.4/sq mi (7.1/km^{2}). The racial makeup of the township was 99.52% White, 0.08% Asian, 0.08% from other races, and 0.32% from two or more races. Hispanic or Latino of any race were 0.08% of the population.

Of the 482 households, 31.1% had children under the age of 18 living with them, 67.4% were married couples living together, and 6.0% had a female householder with no husband present. Non-family households accounted for 23.4%. 20.5% of all households were made up of individuals, and 11.8% had someone living alone who was 65 years of age or older. The average household size was 2.61 and the average family size was 3.00.

In the township the population was spread out, with 23.7% under the age of 18, 6.4% from 18 to 24, 27.6% from 25 to 44, 25.1% from 45 to 64, and 17.2% who were 65 years of age or older. The median age was 39 years. For every 100 females, there were 101.8 males. For every 100 females age 18 and over, there were 98.1 males.

The median income for a household in the township was $32,407, and the median income for a family was $36,810. Males had a median income of $29,706 versus $19,375 for females. The per capita income for the township was $14,516. About 6.5% of families and 10.3% of the population were below the poverty line, including 13.2% of those under age 18 and 15.7% of those age 65 or over.
