= Burnham, Pennsylvania =

Borough in Pennsylvania, US

- Borough
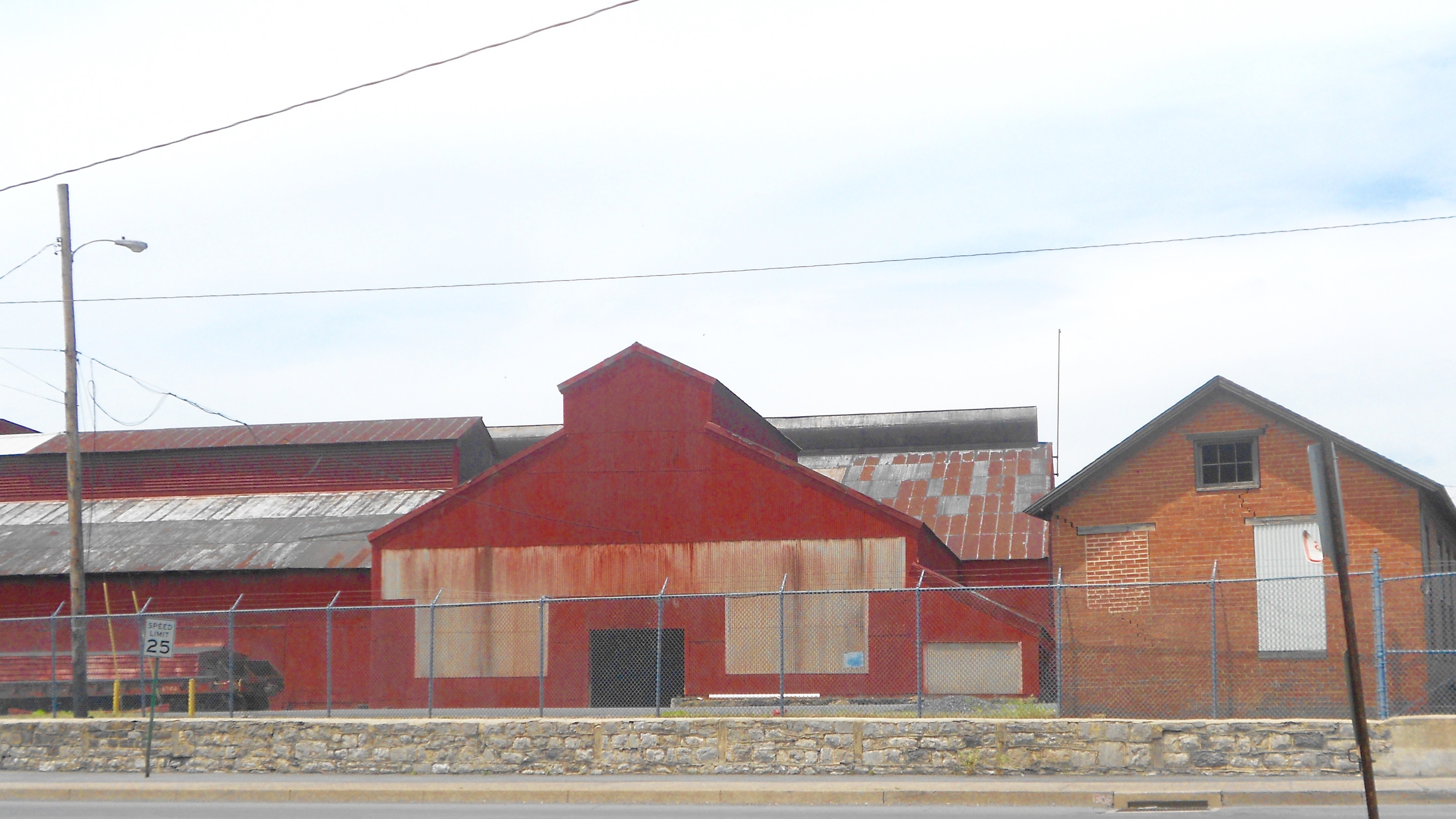
- Steel mill in Burnham

- Location of Burnham in Mifflin County, Pennsylvania.

- Location within Pennsylvania Location within the United States
- Coordinates: 40°38′06″N 77°33′53″W
- Country: United States
- State: Pennsylvania
- County: Mifflin
- Incorporated: 1911

Government
  - Type: Borough Council
  - Mayor: Tom Harpster
  - Council President: Robert Soccio
  - Council Vice President: Rodney Barger

Area
  - Total: 1.07 sq mi (2.76 km^{2})
  - Land: 1.05 sq mi (2.73 km^{2})
  - Water: 0.015 sq mi (0.04 km^{2})

Population (2020)
  - Total: 1,991
  - Density: 1,891.8/sq mi (730.43/km^{2})
- Time zone: UTC-5 (Eastern (EST))
  - Summer (DST): UTC-4 (EDT)
- ZIP code: 17009
- Area codes: 717 and 223
- FIPS code: 42-10256
- Website: burnhamborough.net

Burnham is a borough in Mifflin County, Pennsylvania, United States. The population was 1,999 at the 2020 census.

== Geography ==
Burnham is located at 40°38′6″N 77°33′53″W (40.635137, -77.564678).

According to the United States Census Bureau, the borough has a total area of 1.1 square miles (2.8 km^{2}), all land

== Demographics ==
Historical population
Census	Pop.	Note	%±
1920	2,765		—
1930	3,089		11.7%
1940	2,997		−3.0%
1950	2,954		−1.4%
1960	2,755		−6.7%
1970	2,607		−5.4%
1980	2,457		−5.8%
1990	2,197		−10.6%
2000	2,144		−2.4%
2010	2,054		−4.2%
2020	1,991		−3.1%
2021 (est.)	1,990	▼	−0.1%

At the 2010 census there were 2,054 people, 866 households, and 577 families residing in the borough. The population density was 1,927.9 inhabitants per square mile (744.4/km^{2}). There were 934 housing units at an average density of 876.7 per square mile (338.5/km^{2}). The racial makeup of the borough was 98.0% White, 0.4% Black or African American, 0.2% Asian, 0.6% other, and 0.8% from two or more races. Hispanic or Latino of any race were 1.5%.

There were 866 households, 30.5% had children under the age of 18 living with them, 47.6% were married couples living together, 5.8% had a male householder with no wife present, 13.3% had a female householder with no husband present, and 33.4% were non-families. 28.4% of households were made up of individuals, and 12.3% were one person aged 65 or older. The average household size was 2.37 and the average family size was 2.86.

In the borough the population was spread out, with 22.1% under the age of 18, 8.3% from 18 to 24, 27.0% from 25 to 44, 26.8% from 45 to 64, and 15.8% 65 or older. The median age was 40 years. For every 100 females there were 98.1 males. For every 100 females age 18 and over, there were 93.0 males.

The median household income was $36,411 and the median family income was $47,193. The per capita income for the borough was $18,929. About 5.0% of families and 9.5% of the population were below the poverty line, including 8.5% of those under age 18 and 12.0% of those age 65 or over.

== Education ==
The borough is situated in the Mifflin County School District. The zoned high school is Mifflin County High School.
