= Decatur Township, Mifflin County, Pennsylvania =

Township in Pennsylvania, US

Coordinates: 40°45′00″N 77°21′59″W

- Township
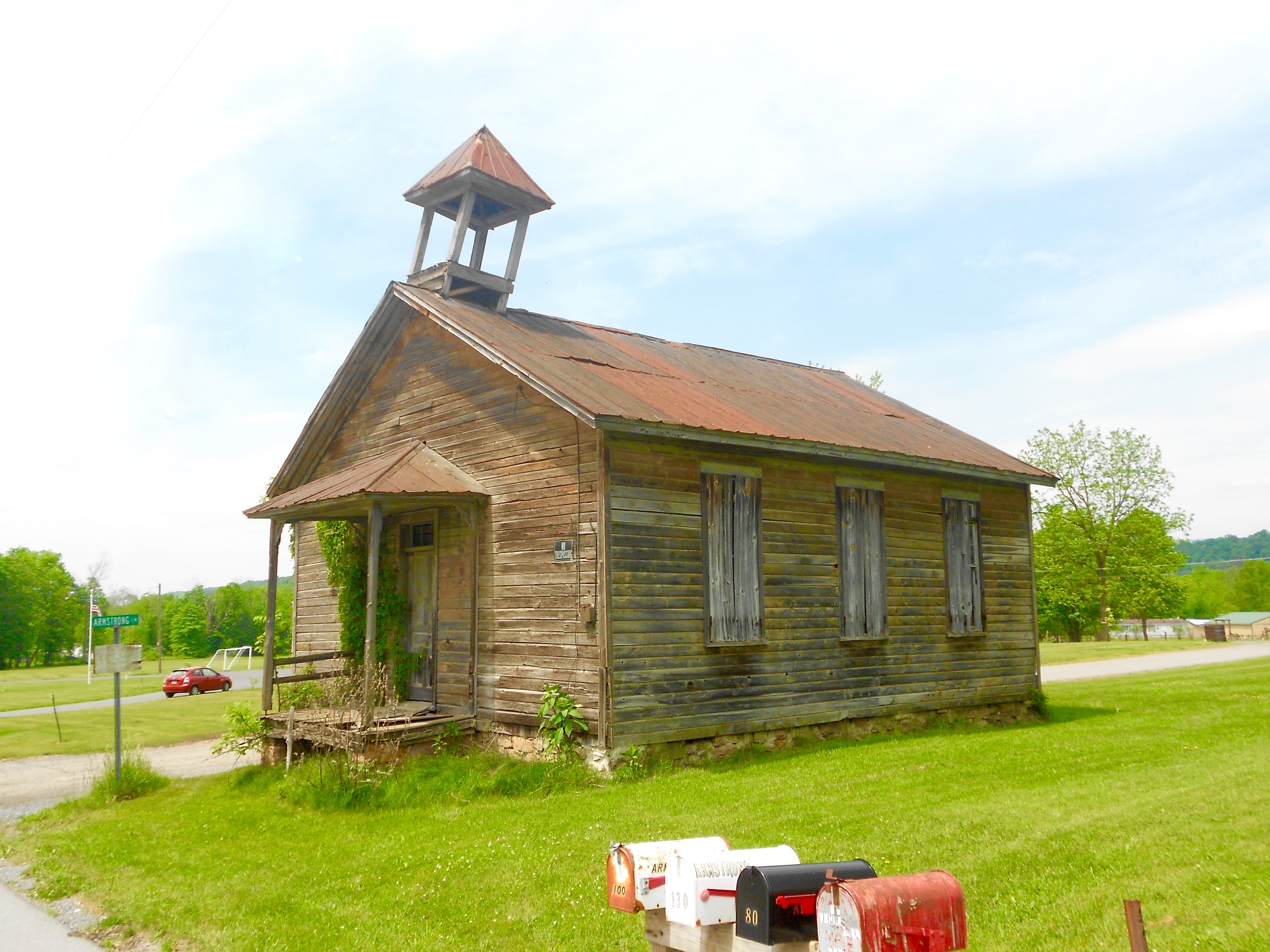
- Old schoolhouse on Armstrong Lane and Back Maitland Road

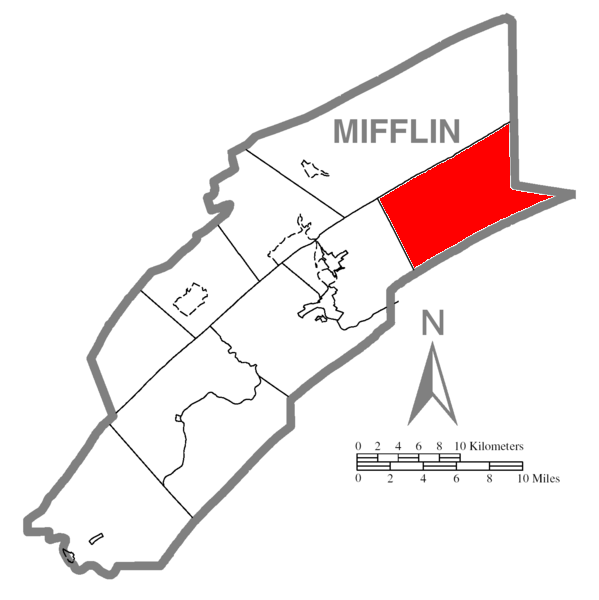
- Map of Mifflin County, Pennsylvania highlighting Decatur Township

- Map of Mifflin County, Pennsylvania
- Country: United States
- State: Pennsylvania
- County: Mifflin
- Settled: 1763
- Incorporated: 1813

Government
  - Type: Board of Supervisors
  - Chairman: Richard Fultz
  - Supervisor: Rodney Goss
  - Supervisor: Mark Wolfgang

Area
  - Total: 45.17 sq mi (116.99 km^{2})
  - Land: 45.08 sq mi (116.75 km^{2})
  - Water: 0.097 sq mi (0.25 km^{2})

Population (2020)
  - Total: 2,967 ▼
  - Estimate (2022): 2,943
  - Density: 68.5/sq mi (26.44/km^{2})
- Time zone: UTC-5 (Eastern (EST))
  - Summer (DST): UTC-4 (EDT)
- Area code: 717
- FIPS code: 42-087-18464

Decatur Township is a township in Mifflin County, Pennsylvania, United States. The population was 2,967 at the 2020 census. This township is named after war hero Stephen Decatur, Jr.

== Geography ==
According to the United States Census Bureau, the township has a total area of 45.2 square miles (117 km^{2}), all land. It contains the census-designated places of Alfarata and Wagner.

== Demographics ==
Historical population
Census	Pop.	Note	%±
2010	3,137		—
2020	2,967		−5.4%
2022 (est.)	2,943		−0.8%
U.S. Decennial Census

As of the census of 2000, there were 3,021 people, 1,114 households, and 885 families residing in the township. The population density was 66.8 inhabitants per square mile (25.8/km^{2}). There were 1,237 housing units at an average density of 27.4 per square mile (10.6/km^{2}). The racial makeup of the township was 98.81% White, 0.60% African American, 0.07% Native American, 0.17% Asian, 0.07% from other races, and 0.30% from two or more races. Hispanic or Latino of any race were 0.40% of the population.

There were 1,114 households, out of which 34.3% had children under the age of 18 living with them, 68.3% were married couples living together, 5.6% had a female householder with no husband present, and 20.5% were non-families. 16.3% of all households were made up of individuals, and 7.3% had someone living alone who was 65 years of age or older. The average household size was 2.71 and the average family size was 3.03.

In the township the population was spread out, with 25.3% under the age of 18, 7.2% from 18 to 24, 31.1% from 25 to 44, 25.0% from 45 to 64, and 11.4% who were 65 years of age or older. The median age was 37 years. For every 100 females, there were 106.2 males. For every 100 females age 18 and over, there were 104.0 males.

The median income for a household in the township was $40,474, and the median income for a family was $42,206. Males had a median income of $30,906 versus $20,096 for females. The per capita income for the township was $15,248. About 5.6% of families and 8.4% of the population were below the poverty line, including 12.9% of those under age 18 and 3.8% of those age 65 or over.
