= Brown Township, Mifflin County, Pennsylvania =

Township in Pennsylvania, US

Coordinates: 40°40′14″N 77°36′33″W

- Township
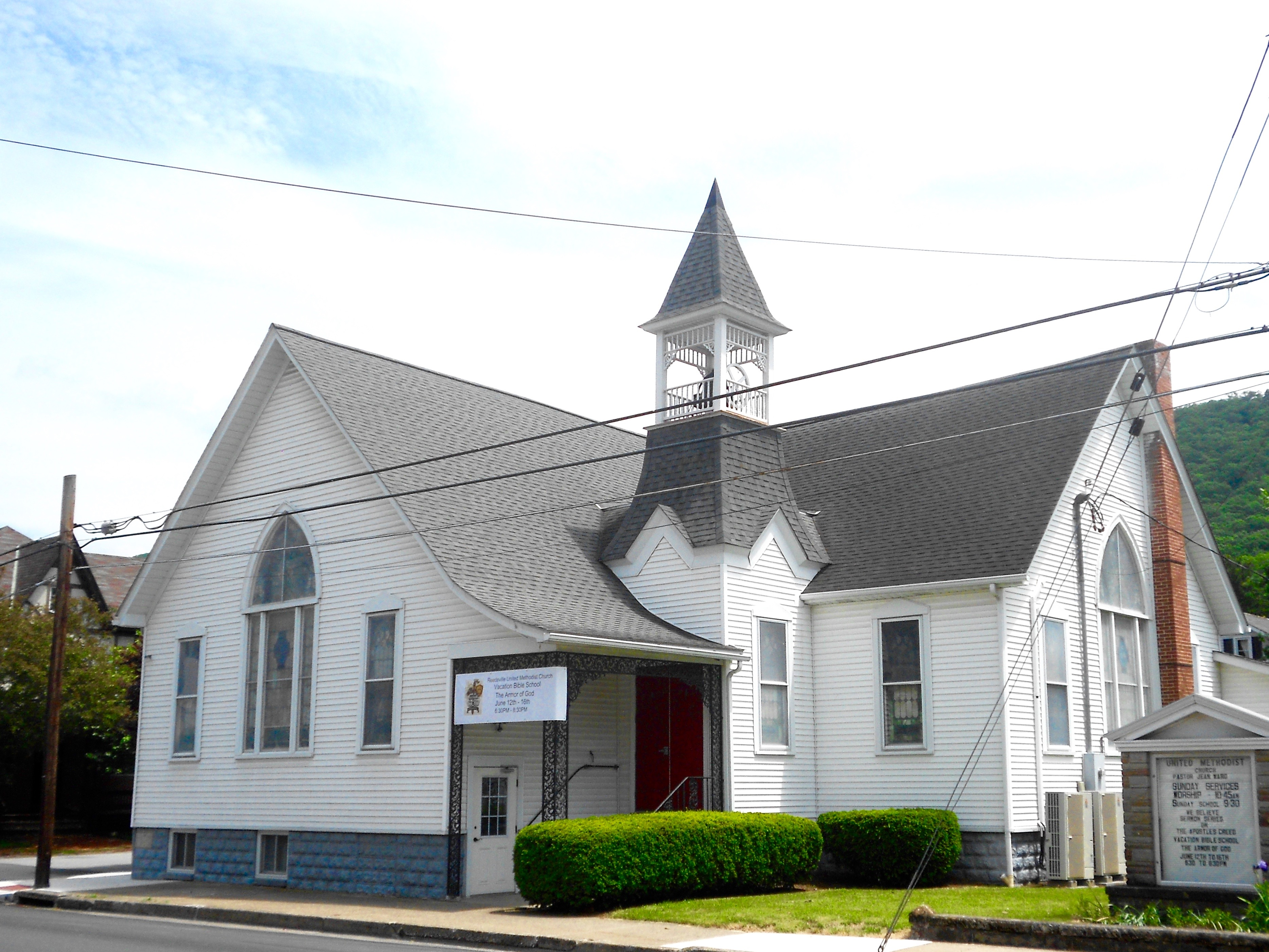
- United Methodist Church in Reedsville

- Seal

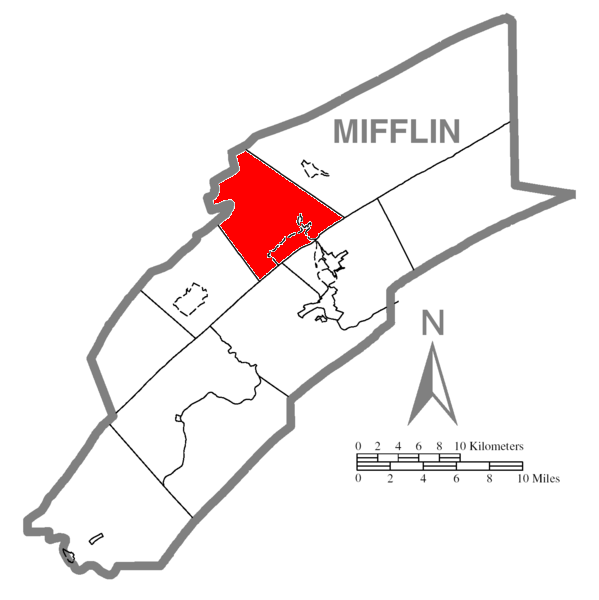
- Map of Mifflin County, Pennsylvania highlighting Brown Township

- Map of Mifflin County, Pennsylvania
- Country: United States
- State: Pennsylvania
- County: Mifflin
- Settled: 1750
- Incorporated: 1837

Government
  - Type: Board of Supervisors
  - Chairman: Kay Hamilton
  - Vice Chairman: James Peachey
  - Supervisor: Jamie Fultz

Area
  - Total: 32.92 sq mi (85.27 km^{2})
  - Land: 32.82 sq mi (85.00 km^{2})
  - Water: 0.10 sq mi (0.26 km^{2})

Population (2020)
  - Total: 4,119 ▲
  - Estimate (2022): 4,142
  - Density: 124.6/sq mi (48.09/km^{2})
- Time zone: UTC-5 (Eastern (EST))
  - Summer (DST): UTC-4 (EDT)
- Area code: 717
- FIPS code: 42-087-09288
- Website: Brown Township

Brown Township is a township in Mifflin County, Pennsylvania, United States. The population was 4,119 at the 2020 census.

== Geography ==
According to the United States Census Bureau, the township has a total area of 33.2 square miles (86 km^{2}), all land. It contains the census-designated places of Barrville, Lumber City, Reedsville, and part of Church Hill.

== Demographics ==
Historical population
Census	Pop.	Note	%±
1850	1,015		—
1860	1,069		5.3%
1870	1,192		11.5%
1880	1,376		15.4%
1890	1,457		5.9%
1900	1,678		15.2%
1910	1,885		12.3%
2000	3,852		—
2010	4,053		5.2%
2020	4,119		1.6%
2022 (est.)	4,142		0.6%
U.S. Decennial Census

As of the census of 2000, there were 3,852 people, 1,403 households, and 1,080 families residing in the township. The population density was 116.2 inhabitants per square mile (44.9/km^{2}). There were 1,523 housing units at an average density of 45.9 per square mile (17.7/km^{2}). The racial makeup of the township was 98.75% White, 0.36% African American, 0.13% Native American, 0.42% Asian, 0.03% from other races, and 0.31% from two or more races. Hispanic or Latino of any race were 0.21% of the population.

There were 1,403 households, out of which 33.8% had children under the age of 18 living with them, 66.9% were married couples living together, 7.4% had a female householder with no husband present, and 23.0% were non-families. 19.3% of all households were made up of individuals, and 8.5% had someone living alone who was 65 years of age or older. The average household size was 2.70 and the average family size was 3.13.

In the township the population was spread out, with 27.0% under the age of 18, 6.6% from 18 to 24, 26.7% from 25 to 44, 24.1% from 45 to 64, and 15.7% who were 65 years of age or older. The median age was 38 years. For every 100 females, there were 95.7 males. For every 100 females age 18 and over, there were 90.7 males.

The median income for a household in the township was $37,278, and the median income for a family was $41,722. Males had a median income of $36,583 versus $24,145 for females. The per capita income for the township was $16,784. About 8.5% of families and 11.0% of the population were below the poverty line, including 14.4% of those under age 18 and 9.2% of those age 65 or over.
