= Milroy, Pennsylvania =

Unincorporated community in Pennsylvania, US

Milroy
- Census-designated place
- Location within the U.S. state of Pennsylvania Milroy (the United States)
- Coordinates: 40°42′50″N 77°35′7″W
- Country: United States
- State: Pennsylvania
- County: Mifflin

Area
  - Total: 1.01 sq mi (2.62 km^{2})
  - Land: 1.01 sq mi (2.61 km^{2})
  - Water: 0.0039 sq mi (0.01 km^{2})

Population (2020)
  - Total: 1,550
  - Density: 1,535.9/sq mi (593.03/km^{2})
- Time zone: UTC-5 (Eastern (EST))
  - Summer (DST): UTC-4 (EDT)
- FIPS code: 42-50000

Milroy is a census-designated place (CDP) that is located in the Kishacoquillas Valley of Mifflin County, Pennsylvania, United States. The population was 1,386 at the time of the 2000 census.

== General information ==
- ZIP Code: 17063
- Area Code: 717
- Local Phone Exchange: 667

== Geography ==
Milroy is located at 40°42′50″N 77°35′7″W (40.713936, -77.585275) in Armagh Township.

According to the United States Census Bureau, the CDP has a total area of 0.7 square miles (1.8 km^{2}), all land.

== Demographics ==
Historical population
Census	Pop.	Note	%±
2020	1,550		—
U.S. Decennial Census

As of the census of 2000, there were 1,386 people, 582 households, and 388 families residing in the CDP. The population density was 2,072.0 inhabitants per square mile (800.0/km^{2}). There were 614 housing units at an average density of 917.9 per square mile (354.4/km^{2}). The racial makeup of the CDP was 99.57% White, and 0.43% from two or more races. Hispanic or Latino of any race were 0.43% of the population.

There were 582 households, out of which 31.3% had children under the age of 18 living with them, 52.4% were married couples living together, 9.6% had a female householder with no husband present, and 33.3% were non-families. 29.7% of all households were made up of individuals, and 15.6% had someone living alone who was 65 years of age or older. The average household size was 2.38 and the average family size was 2.95.

In the CDP, the population was spread out, with 24.0% under the age of 18, 6.3% from 18 to 24, 29.1% from 25 to 44, 22.8% from 45 to 64, and 17.7% who were 65 years of age or older. The median age was 38 years. For every 100 females, there were 96.3 males. For every 100 females age 18 and over, there were 90.6 males.

The median income for a household in the CDP was $33,529, and the median income for a family was $42,880. Males had a median income of $30,331 versus $19,167 for females. The per capita income for the CDP was $14,136. About 4.9% of families and 12.1% of the population were below the poverty line, including 9.0% of those under age 18 and 24.4% of those age 65 or over.
