= Pennsylvania Route 257 =

State highway in Pennsylvania, US

Pennsylvania Route 257

Route information
- Maintained by PennDOT
- Length: 5.12 mi (8.24 km)
- Existed: 1930–present

Major junctions
- South end: US 322 in Cranberry Township
- North end: US 62 in Oil City

Location
- Country: United States
- State: Pennsylvania
- Counties: Venango

Highway system
- Pennsylvania State Route System; Interstate; US; State; Scenic; Legislative
← PA 256	→ PA 258

Pennsylvania Route 257 (PA 257) is a 5.12-mile-long (8.24 km) state highway located in Venango County in Pennsylvania. The southern terminus is at U.S. Route 322 (US 322) in Cranberry Township. The northern terminus is at US 62 in Oil City.

== Route description ==
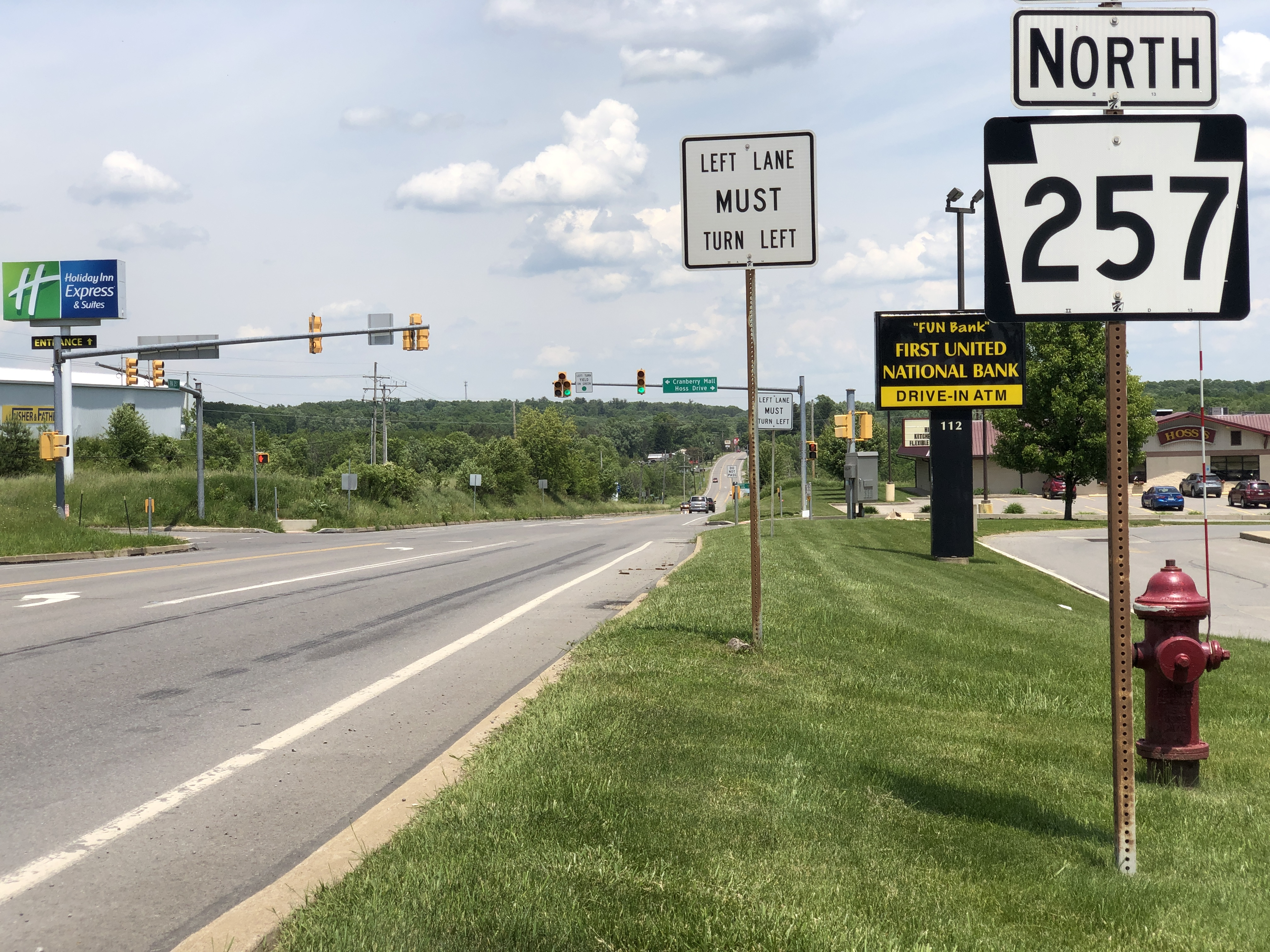
PA 257 northbound past US 322 in Cranberry Township

PA 257 begins at an intersection with US 322 in Cranberry Township, heading north on a three-lane undivided road with a center left-turn lane. The route passes through a mix of farmland and woodland with residential and commercial development, heading east of the Cranberry Mall past the US 322 intersection and running west of UPMC Northwest hospital. PA 257 continues past homes and businesses in the community of Seneca before heading into wooded areas with residences. The route passes to the east of the community of Woodland Heights through forests as a three-lane road with one northbound lane and two southbound lanes. PA 257 curves northeast and comes to its northern terminus at US 62 on the border of Cranberry Township and the city of Oil City.

== Major intersections ==
The entire route is in Venango County.

Location	mi	km	Destinations	Notes
Cranberry Township	0.00	0.00	US 322 (Twenty-Eighth Division Highway) – Franklin, Clarion	Southern terminus
Oil City	5.12	8.24	US 62 (East 2nd Street/Riverside Drive) – Franklin, Tionesta	Northern terminus
1.000 mi = 1.609 km; 1.000 km = 0.621 mi
