= Woodland Heights =

Woodland Heights is the name of four places in the United States of America:

- Woodland Heights, Houston, Texas, an historic neighborhood on Houston's near north side
- Woodland Heights, Pennsylvania, a census-designated place in Venango County
- Woodland Heights, Richmond, Virginia, a neighborhood on Richmond's Southside
