= Innovation Park =

Innovation Park may refer to:

- Innovation Park (Florida State University)
- Innovation Park (Pennsylvania State University)
- Innovation Park (University of Missouri System)
- Innovation Park (University of Wisconsin–Milwaukee)
