= U.S. Route 322 in Pennsylvania =

Highway in Pennsylvania

U.S. Route 322
- 28th Division Highway
- US 322 highlighted in red and truck routes in Downingtown in blue

Route information
- Auxiliary route of US 22
- Maintained by PennDOT and DRPA
- Length: 370 mi (600 km)

Major junctions
- West end: US 322 at the Ohio state line in West Shenango Township
- I-79 in Meadville; I-80 in Clarion Township; I-99 / US 220 in State College; US 22 / US 522 in Lewistown; US 11 / US 15 in Duncannon; I-81 / US 22 in Harrisburg; I-83 / I-283 near Harrisburg; US 30 near Downingtown; US 1 in Concordville; I-95 in Chester
- East end: US 322 at the New Jersey state line in Chester

Location
- Country: United States
- State: Pennsylvania
- Counties: Crawford, Mercer, Venango, Clarion, Jefferson, Clearfield, Centre, Mifflin, Juniata, Perry, Dauphin, Lebanon, Lancaster, Chester, Delaware

Highway system
- United States Numbered Highway System; List; Special; Divided; Pennsylvania State Route System; Interstate; US; State; Scenic; Legislative
← PA 321	→ PA 324

U.S. Route 322 (US 322) is a spur of US 22, running from Cleveland, Ohio, east to Atlantic City, New Jersey. In the U.S. state of Pennsylvania, the route runs from the Ohio state line in West Shenango Township southeast to the Commodore Barry Bridge over the Delaware River in Chester, at which point the route crosses into New Jersey, meeting the New Jersey Turnpike at exit 2. The route passes near or through several cities, including Meadville, DuBois, State College, and Harrisburg. US 322 in Pennsylvania is named the 28th Division Highway in honor of the 28th Infantry Division.

== Route description ==
In Pennsylvania, US 322 is signed as 28th Division Highway, in honor of the 28th Infantry Division.

=== Ohio to Brookville ===
US 322 enters Pennsylvania from Ohio in Crawford County, heading southeast on two-lane undivided Williamsfield Road. The road runs through rural areas on the southwest border of Pymatuning State Park, which is home to the Pymatuning Reservoir. Past the state park, the route crosses into Mercer County and heads into the borough of Jamestown, becoming Gibson Street and coming to an intersection with PA 58. At this point, the two routes head east for a concurrency along Liberty Street, crossing the Shenango River. US 322 splits from PA 58 by turning north onto Depot Street. The route leaves Jamestown and crosses back into Crawford County, becoming an unnamed road. The road curves northeast and comes to the community of Hartstown, where it becomes Liberty Street and reaches an intersection with PA 18. At this point, PA 18 turns northeast for a concurrency with US 322 and the road comes to a bridge over the Canadian National's Bessemer Subdivision railroad line as it curves northeast and continues as an unnamed road. Farther northeast, the road enters the borough of Conneaut Lake and becomes State Street, turning north onto South 4th Street to come to an intersection with US 6/PA 285 in the center of the borough. At this point, US 322/PA 18 turn east to join US 6 and PA 285 on Water Street. A block later, PA 285 splits to the south. US 6/US 322/PA 18 become a five-lane road with a center left-turn lane and head east out of the borough, passing to the south of Conneaut Lake. PA 18 splits from US 6/US 322 by turning to the north, with US 6/US 322 continuing east-northeast on Conneaut Lake Road. The road heads into a business area to the west of the city of Meadville and comes to a roundabout with US 19 and the southern terminus of PA 98, at which point US 19 becomes concurrent with US 6 and US 322. The roadway becomes a four-lane divided highway and comes to a cloverleaf interchange with I-79. Past this interchange, the three routes reach an intersection with the southern terminus of PA 102 before curving north and entering Meadville upon crossing French Creek and a Western New York and Pennsylvania Railroad line. The road becomes French Creek Parkway before US 322 splits from US 6 and US 19 by turning to the east onto two-lane undivided Linden Street. The route runs through developed areas and turns south onto South Main Street before leaving Meadville. The road becomes Cochranton Road and runs through rural areas to the east of French Creek and the Western New York and Pennsylvania Railroad line. US 322 curves to the southeast and the name changes to Meadville Road. The route becomes an unnamed road and passes through the northern part of the borough of Cochranton before it comes to an intersection with PA 173. Past this intersection, the road curves to the south. The route crosses into Mercer County, where it makes a turn to the east.

US 322 heads into Venango County and runs east, curving southeast in the community of Hannasville. The road enters the borough of Sugarcreek, where it crosses Sugar Creek and comes to an intersection with the southern terminus of PA 427. From here, the route curves south to run east of the parallel Sugar Creek before turning east and running north of French Creek and the Western New York and Pennsylvania Railroad line. US 322 turns south alongside the creek and railroad tracks before it curves east and enters the city of Franklin. At this point, the road becomes Grant Street and passes through developed areas of the city, curving northeast and back to the east. US 322 reaches an intersection with the southern terminus of PA 417, at which point it turns south onto four-lane undivided 13th Street, crossing the Western New York and Pennsylvania Railroad line at-grade. The road turns into a divided highway and crosses French Creek, becoming undivided again and heading into the downtown area of Franklin. US 322 comes to an intersection with US 62/PA 8, at which point it turns east for a concurrency with the two routes on four-lane undivided Liberty Street. The road turns southeast and leaves the downtown area, narrowing to one lane westbound before US 62/PA 8 split from US 322 by turning to the northeast. US 322 continues south along two-lane undivided Liberty Street before it turns east onto 8th Street and crosses the Allegheny River, leaving Franklin. From here, the route becomes an unnamed road and curves south parallel to the river, running through rural areas. The road turns to the east and passes through the community of Venango before the Allegheny River curves south away from the road, with the road gaining a second eastbound lane as it climbs a hill. US 322 narrows to two lanes prior to reaching the community of Cranberry. Here, the route passes businesses and heads to the south of the Cranberry Mall before it intersects the southern terminus of PA 257. Past this intersection, the road runs through rural land, crossing East Sandy Creek and reaching a junction with the northern terminus of PA 38.

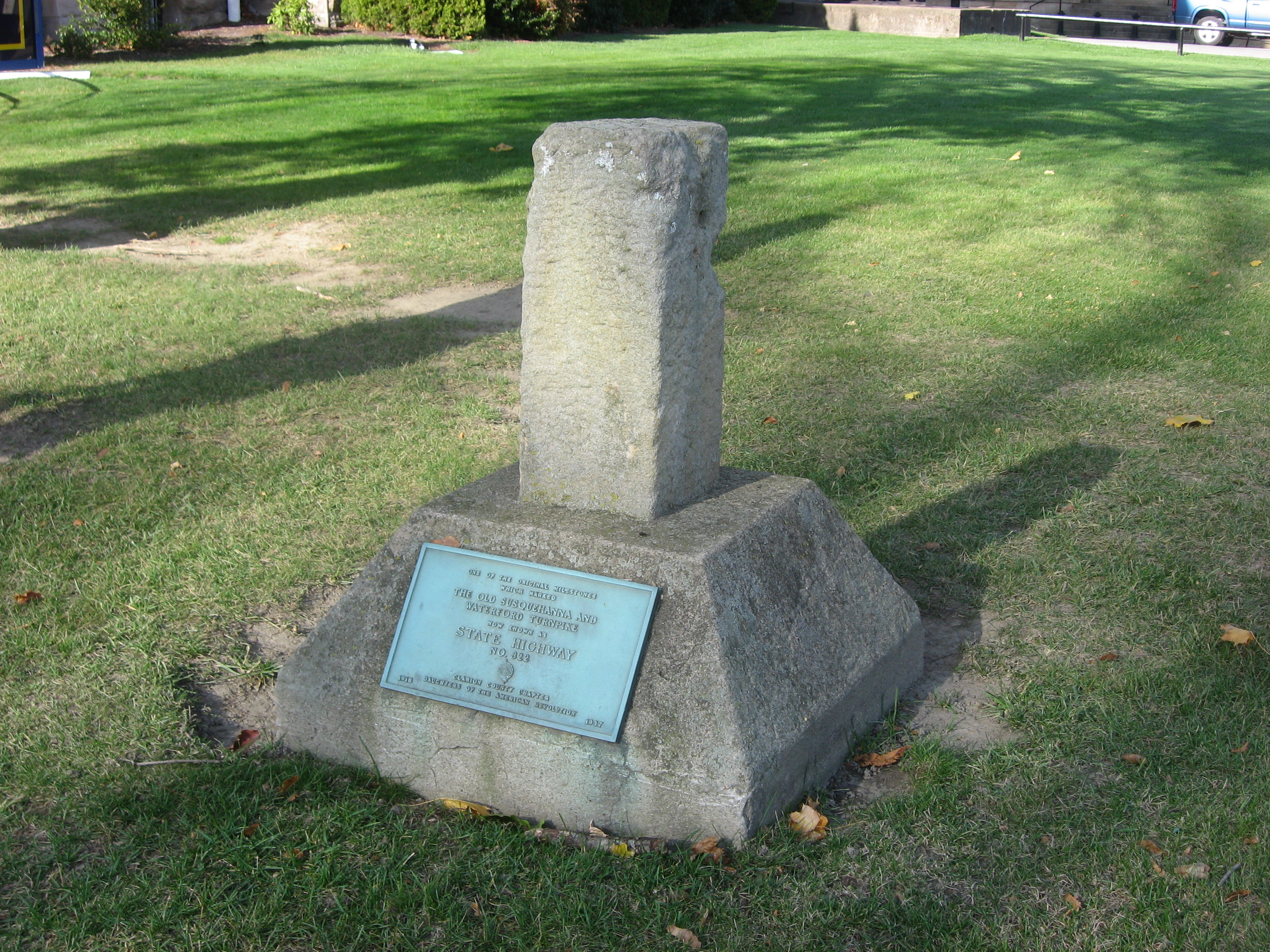
Early mile marker along US 322 in Clarion

US 322 enters Clarion County and continues southeast, intersecting the eastern terminus of PA 338 in the community of Kossuth. Farther east, the road reaches the borough of Shippenville. Upon entering Shippenville, the route becomes Main Street and intersects PA 208. At this point, PA 208 joins US 322 in a concurrency before it splits to the north. The route leaves Shippenville and becomes unnamed again, passing south of a residential development. The road reaches an intersection with PA 66 near businesses in the community of Marianne. Past this intersection, US 322 runs southeast through rural areas before it gains a second westbound lane as it descends a hill. The route narrows to two lanes and curves east, crossing the Clarion River. After crossing the river, the road gains a second eastbound lane as it ascends a hill. US 322 curves south and enters the borough of Clarion, where it narrows to two lanes and becomes North 1st Avenue, running through developed areas and passing east of Memorial Stadium. The route turns southeast onto Main Street and heads into the downtown area of Clarion, where it intersects the eastern terminus of PA 68. After leaving the downtown area, the road passes through the PennWest Clarion university campus. US 322 leaves Clarion and becomes an unnamed road, passing east through rural areas. Farther east, the route enters the borough of Strattanville and runs east through the borough along Main Street. The road leaves Strattanville and becomes unnamed, heading east-southeast and reaching a partial cloverleaf interchange with I-80.

US 322 crosses into Jefferson County and enters the borough of Corsica, where it becomes Main Street, forming a concurrency with PA 949 before that route splits to the south. Upon leaving Corsica, the route turns into an unnamed road and runs a short distance to the south of I-80, passing through the community of Roseville and curving to the east-southeast.

=== Brookville to State College ===
Farther east, the road enters the borough of Brookville and becomes West Main Street, continuing into an area of businesses and coming to an intersection where PA 28 heads south and PA 36 and PA 28 Truck heads north. At this point, US 322 forms a concurrency with PA 28 and PA 36, running through developed areas of the borough. The road becomes Main Street and PA 36 splits from US 322/PA 28 by heading to the south, with US 322/PA 28 continuing east through the downtown area of Brookville. The road curves northeast and southeast out of the downtown area before crossing the North Fork Creek and running east along East Main Street. On the eastern border of Brookville, PA 28 splits to the east and US 322 continues southeast through rural areas as an unnamed road, crossing Mill Creek in the community of Port Barnett. The route passes through the community of Emerickville as it continues along. Farther east, the road turns to the south and enters the borough of Reynoldsville, where the name becomes West Main Street and it curves east. US 322 continues southeast and comes to an intersection with the southern terminus of PA 950 before it crosses a Buffalo and Pittsburgh Railroad line at-grade and Sandy Lick Creek. The route becomes East Main Street and runs through the downtown area of Reynoldsville, where it has a junction with the northern terminus of PA 310. US 322 leaves Reynoldsville becomes an unnamed road and continues through rural areas, curving northeast in the community of Prescottville. The route continues east and runs through the community of Rathmel.

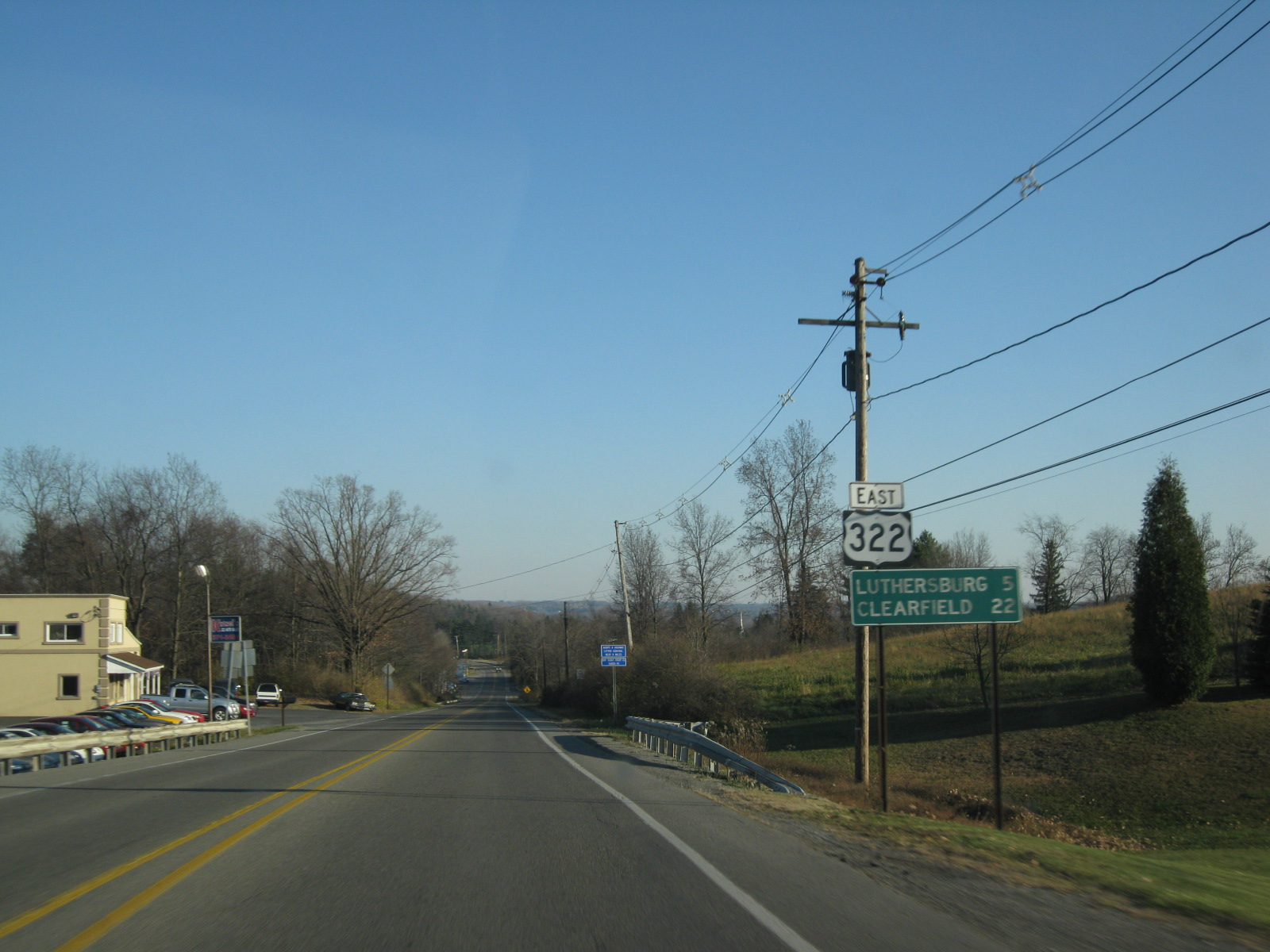
US 322 eastbound past US 119 in Sandy Township

US 322 enters Clearfield County and runs east-southeast along Behringer Highway, coming to an intersection with US 119 south of the city of DuBois. The route continues east and reaches a junction with US 219, where it briefly becomes a divided highway. At this point, US 219 joins US 322 in a concurrency along two-lane undivided Carson Hill Road. The two routes pass over a Buffalo and Pittsburgh Railroad line and head southeast, passing through the community of Salem. The road reaches the community of Luthersburg, where it intersects the eastern terminus of PA 410. The two routes curve east onto Luthersburg-Rockton Road and US 219 splits from US 322 by turning to the south. US 322 continues east, curving northeast before reaching the community of Rockton. In Rockton, the route turns east and becomes Rockton Mountain Highway, entering the Moshannon State Forest. Upon entering the state forest, the road turns southeast, crossing Anderson Creek, and then turning northeast before curving to the east. Farther east, US 322 reaches an intersection with PA 153, where it turns southeast to form a concurrency with that route on four-lane divided Rockton Mountain Highway. The road leaves the Moshannon State Forest and continues through rural areas. The two routes enter more developed areas north of the borough of Clearfield as a three-lane road with a center left-turn lane, crossing a R.J. Corman Railroad line at-grade. US 322/PA 153 curve south onto West Front Street and enter the borough of Clearfield. The two routes turn southeast onto two-lane Nichols Street and cross the West Branch Susquehanna River, with the road name becoming Bridge Street. PA 153 splits from US 322 on the east bank of the river by turning south, with US 322 continuing east along Bridge Street before curving north onto Bigler Avenue. The route turns east-southeast as it continues through the borough.

The road leaves Clearfield and becomes Daisy Street, turning into a divided highway as it reaches a partial cloverleaf interchange with PA 879. Past this interchange, US 322 becomes undivided again and runs through developed areas, crossing a R.J. Corman Railroad line at-grade and Clearfield Creek. The route gains a center left-turn lane and the name changes to Clearfield Woodland Highway, passing south of the Clearfield Campus of Lock Haven University of Pennsylvania. The road narrows to two lanes and it runs through rural areas, turning south and gaining a second eastbound lane before a turn to the east. US 322 narrows back to two lanes and passes through the community of Mineral Springs before it comes to an intersection with the southern terminus of PA 970, where the name changes to Woodland Bigler Highway. The route curves to the southeast before gaining a center left-turn lane and turning to the south, intersecting Bigler Cutoff Road. The road becomes Philipsburg Bigler Highway and narrows back to two lanes, crossing a R.J. Corman Railroad line at-grade. US 322 curves southeast and passes through the southwest corner of the borough of Wallaceton before it runs parallel to the railroad tracks. Farther southeast, the route gains a center left-turn lane as it enters business areas along North Front Street, crossing the R.J. Corman Railroad tracks and coming to an intersection with PA 53, where PA 53 turns southeast for a concurrency with US 322 along a two-lane road.

Upon crossing Moshannon Creek, US 322/PA 53 enters Centre County and heads east past developed areas along North Centre Street, which carries two eastbound lanes and one westbound lane. Upon reaching the northern border of the borough of Philipsburg, US 322 splits from PA 53 by turning northeast onto Railroad Street, a three-lane road with a center left-turn lane. The route narrows to two lanes and enters Philipsburg, curving to the southeast. The road turns south and intersects PA 504 before heading southeast again and leaving Philipsburg. US 322 becomes Port Matilda Highway and passes a westbound runaway truck ramp as it runs through rural areas, ascending Black Bear Hill. The road passes a westbound truck brake check station and curves east and then south. The route makes a turn to the southeast and comes to a rest area accessible from both directions on the westbound side of the road, crossing Sandy Ridge. US 322 becomes a four-lane divided highway with a wide median called Flat Rock Road, curving east into the Moshannon State Forest before turning southeast and leaving the state forest. The route intersects Reese Hollow Road/East Mountain Road, with access via an at-grade intersection eastbound and an interchange westbound. Following this, the median narrows and the four-lane divided highway enters the Bald Eagle Valley, coming to an eastbound exit and westbound entrance with North High Street that provides access to the borough of Port Matilda. At this point, US 322 becomes an unnamed freeway and continues east to a westbound exit and eastbound entrance with I-99/US 220, at which point it joins I-99/US 220; North High Street provides the missing movements at this interchange. I-99/US 220/US 322 run east, passing over US 220 Alt. and a Nittany and Bald Eagle Railroad line before curving northeast. The freeway heads across Bald Eagle Mountain before it turns east and then southeast into the Nittany Valley, passing over PA 550 before reaching a partial cloverleaf interchange with Grays Woods Boulevard that provides access to the communities of Grays Woods and Waddle.

=== State College to Harrisburg ===
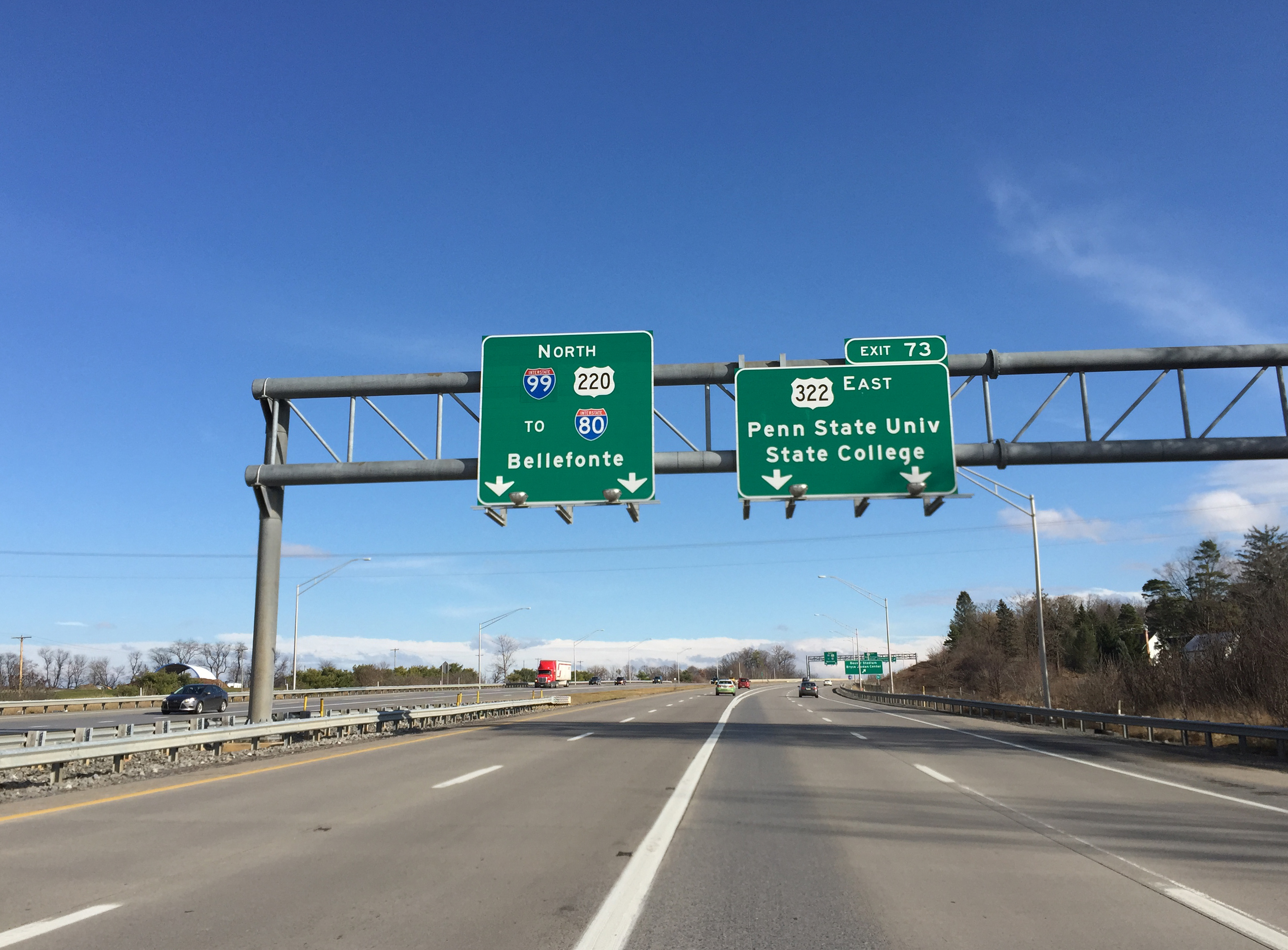
US 322 eastbound at split with I-99/US 220 northbound in College Township, near State College

I-99/US 220/US 322 come to an eastbound exit and westbound entrance with the western terminus of US 322 Bus., which heads east into the borough of State College. At this point, the freeway becomes the Mount Nittany Expressway and bypasses State College to the north. A short distance later, the freeway reaches a westbound exit and eastbound entrance with Valley Vista Drive that serves the community of Park Forest. From here, the road passes through a mix of rural and developed areas, coming to a diamond interchange with Waddle Road that serves the communities of Toftrees and Woodycrest. I-99/US 220/US 322 continues east before reaching the Mount Nittany Interchange, a directional T interchange where I-99/US 220 splits from US 322 by heading to the northeast. Also at the Mount Nittany Interchange, US 322 has a partial cloverleaf interchange with Park Avenue that provides access to the University Park campus of Pennsylvania State University, including Beaver Stadium and the Bryce Jordan Center, and the Innovation Park business and research park. From here, US 322 continues southeast on the Mount Nittany Expressway, coming to a diamond interchange with PA 26 that serves State College. At this point, US 322 becomes concurrent with PA 144 Truck. The freeway winds south before heading to the southeast and then to the east. The route comes to a partial cloverleaf interchange with Boalsburg Road/Warner Boulevard that provides access to PA 45 and the community of Boalsburg. US 322 turns to the southeast to reach and eastbound exit and westbound entrance with PA 45, where it narrows from a four-lane freeway to a two-lane expressway. A short distance later, the Mount Nittany Expressway ends at a westbound exit and eastbound entrance with the eastern terminus of US 322 Bus. From here, US 322 continues east along Boal Avenue, a two-lane undivided road with at-grade intersections. The road runs through agricultural areas with some development to the north of Tussey Mountain. Farther east, the route becomes General Potter Highway. US 322 widens into a four-lane divided highway as it comes to a diamond interchange with Old Route 322 that provides access to the southern terminus of PA 144 in the community of Potters Mills, at which point the concurrent PA 144 Truck ends. From here, the route heads south into the Rothrock State Forest and traverses the Seven Mountains, which includes Tussey Mountain and Stone Mountain. The road comes to an interchange with Sand Mountain Road before it makes a curve to the southwest.

US 322 crosses into Mifflin County and becomes an unnamed road, coming to an eastbound truck brake check station. At this point, the route begins to descend the Seven Mountains, passing between Rothrock State Forest to the west and Bald Eagle State Forest to the east. The road turns south and then southwest before it reaches an eastbound runaway truck ramp and makes a curve to the southeast, passing west of the Laurel Creek Reservoir. US 322 turns northeast and leaves the state forest, curving east and becoming a freeway. The route turns south through forests and enters the agricultural Kishacoquillas Valley, where it comes to a trumpet interchange connecting to Old US Hwy 322 that provides access to the community of Milroy. The freeway continues south and reaches a diamond interchange with PA 655 that serves the community of Reedsville. Past this interchange, US 322 runs southeast and crosses the Kishacoquillas Creek, heading through a gap in Jacks Mountain along with the creek. The route curves south and comes to an interchange with Ferguson Valley Road that provides access to the community of Yeagertown and the borough of Burnham. The freeway runs through rural areas before passing near development and reaching a directional T interchange with the US 22/US 522 freeway. At this point, US 22/US 522 become concurrent with US 322 and the freeway has an interchange with Electric Avenue. From here, the freeway enters the borough of Lewistown and runs to the west of the Kishacoquillas Creek. US 522 splits from US 22/US 322 at an interchange by heading northeast on East Walnut Street. At the US 522 interchange, the freeway passes over a Juniata Valley Railroad line. Past this interchange, US 22/US 322 curves south along the eastern border of Lewistown and crosses a Juniata Valley Railroad line at-grade before reaching an eastbound exit and westbound entrance with East Charles Street. The freeway crosses the Kishacoquillas Creek and leaves Lewistown upon crossing Jacks Creek and heading into rural areas. The two routes curve east and come to a westbound exit and eastbound entrance with the eastern terminus of US 22 Bus., at which point the freeway begins to parallel the Juniata River located south of the road. US 22/US 322 curves to the northeast and runs between Shade Mountain to the north and the river to the south as it heads through the Lewistown Narrows water gap. This section of road includes the longest mechanically stabilized earth wall in the U.S.

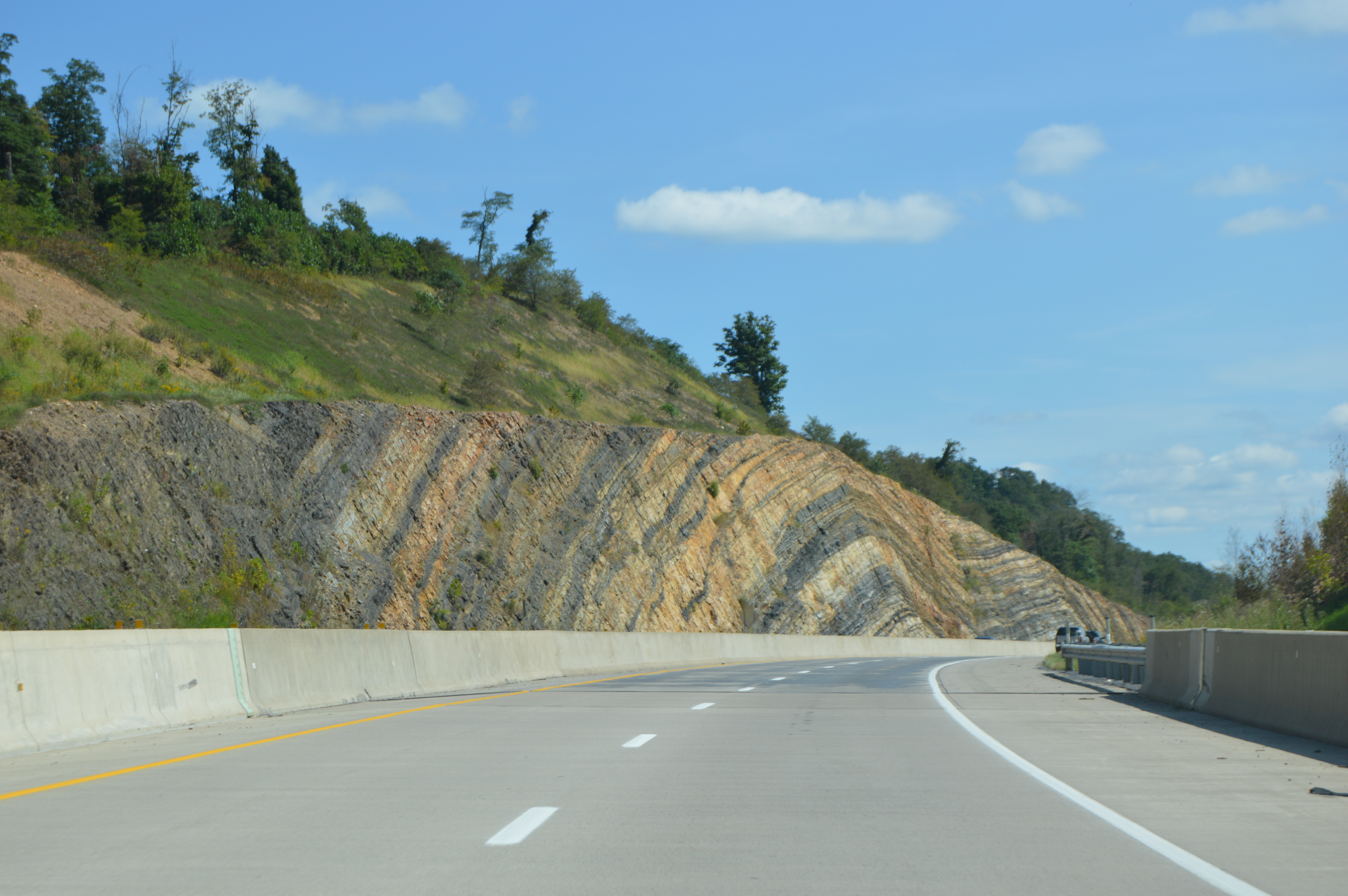
US 22/US 322 freeway eastbound in Fermanagh Township passing a rock cut

US 22/US 322 enters Juniata County and continues through the water gap, coming to an eastbound access point to a fishing and boating area along the Juniata River. Farther east, the freeway curves to the southeast and exits the Lewistown Narrows, heading further from the river and coming to a diamond interchange with Arch Rock Road. The two routes head northeast and then southeast, crossing Lost Creek before turning south and reaching a diamond interchange with PA 35 east of the borough of Mifflintown. US 22/US 322 comes to a partial cloverleaf interchange with the northern terminus of PA 75 northeast of the borough of Port Royal. The freeway continues southeast, turning to the east-northeast. Farther east, the two routes come to a partial cloverleaf interchange with PA 333 on the northern border of the borough of Thompsontown. Past Thompsontown, US 22/US 322 has a westbound exit and eastbound entrance with Pfoutz Valley Road. After this interchange, the freeway runs closely parallel to the north bank of the Juniata River as it passes through a water gap in Tuscarora Mountain.

US 22/US 322 crosses into Perry County, where the freeway and the parallel Juniata River turn southeast out of the water gap. The freeway enters the borough of Millerstown and runs between the river to the west and the borough to the east, passing over PA 17. After leaving the borough, the two routes come to an interchange with West Juniata Parkway that provides access to PA 17 and Millerstown. US 22/US 322 continues through rural areas further east from the Juniata River. The freeway curves south as it passes west of Buffalo Mountain, making a turn east away from the river and reaching a diamond interchange with PA 34 northeast of the borough of Newport. Past this interchange, the two routes begin to parallel the Juniata River again, turning southeast and then east. US 22/US 322 reaches a westbound exit and eastbound entrance with Meadow Grove Road that provides access to the community of Midway and curves southeast alongside the river. The freeway continues south-southeast and reaches an interchange with Huggins Road that serves the community of Watts; this interchange consists of a left exit and entrance eastbound and a right exit and entrance westbound. The two routes continue south parallel to the Juniata River and reach an interchange connecting to River Road that serves the community of Amity Hall.

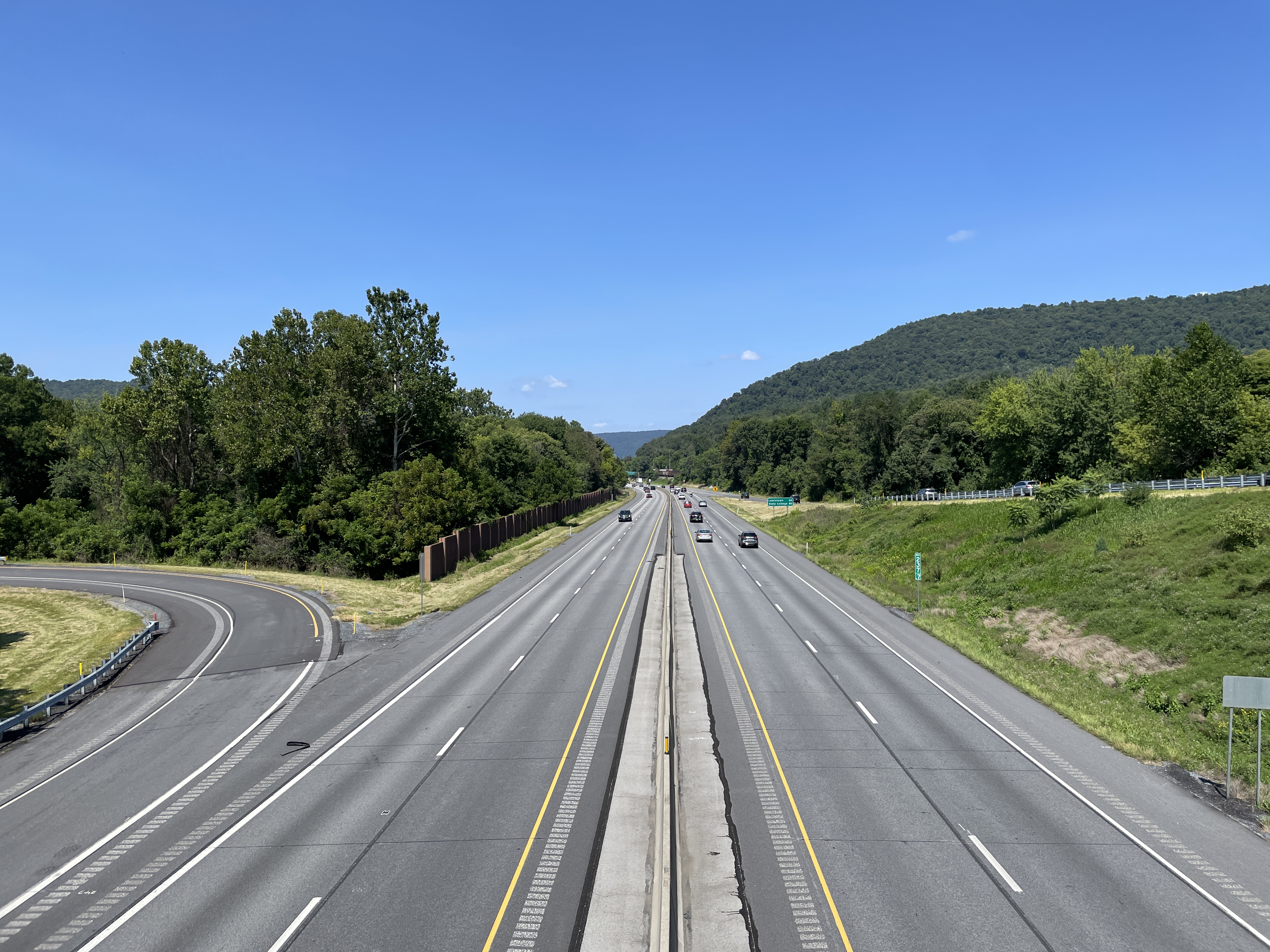
US 22/US 322 westbound at the PA 443 interchange in Middle Paxton Township

US 22/US 322 enters Dauphin County and comes to a modified cloverleaf interchange with the US 11/US 15 freeway. Past this interchange, the freeway ends and the roadway becomes Benvenue Road, a four-lane divided highway. The two routes run through a mix of rural areas and businesses on Duncan Island between the Juniata River to the west and the Susquehanna River to the east. US 22/US 322 intersects the eastern terminus of PA 849 east of the borough of Duncannon, where the road becomes a freeway again. At this point, the unnamed freeway crosses the Susquehanna River on the Clarks Ferry Bridge, which also carries the Appalachian Trail. After crossing the river, the two routes come to a directional T interchange with the southern terminus of PA 147, where the Appalachian Trail splits to the south. Following this interchange, US 22/US 322 turns southwest and runs between the Susquehanna River to the northwest and Norfolk Southern's Buffalo Line to the southeast. The freeway curves southeast along with the parallel river and railroad tracks as it passes west of Peters Mountain. The two routes pass over the Norfolk Southern line and come to a diamond interchange with PA 325 in the community of Speeceville. Past this interchange, US 22/US 322 heads east-southeast through rural areas to the north of the Susquehanna River and Norfolk Southern's Buffalo Line, curving to the east. The freeway reaches a directional T interchange with the southern terminus of PA 225 that serves the borough of Dauphin. From here, the two routes turn southeast and enter the borough of Dauphin, passing near developed areas. The freeway crosses Stony Creek before coming to a westbound exit providing access to Allegheny Street and heading under the railroad line. US 22/US 322 leaves Dauphin and heads southeast between the Susquehanna River to the west and the Norfolk Southern line to the east as it passes west of Second Mountain. Past the mountain, the freeway runs near developed areas farther from the river and comes to a partial cloverleaf interchange with PA 443 in the community of Fort Hunter. The two routes continue south-southeast, crossing over Norfolk Southern's Buffalo Line and passing to the west of Blue Mountain. US 22/US 322 heads southeast parallel to Norfolk Southern's Pittsburgh Line to the west and reaches a diamond interchange with PA 39, where the parallel railroad line heads further west from the road. At this point, the freeway enters the city of Harrisburg and runs between Wildwood Park to the west and developed areas to the east, curving south and crossing Paxton Creek before coming to a stack interchange with I-81. At this point, US 322 splits from US 22 by heading east concurrent with I-81 while US 22 continues south toward Downtown Harrisburg.

The section of US 322 between State College and Harrisburg serves as a major access road to Pennsylvania State University from points to the southeast and experiences traffic congestion on Penn State Nittany Lions football home game days.

=== Harrisburg to New Jersey ===
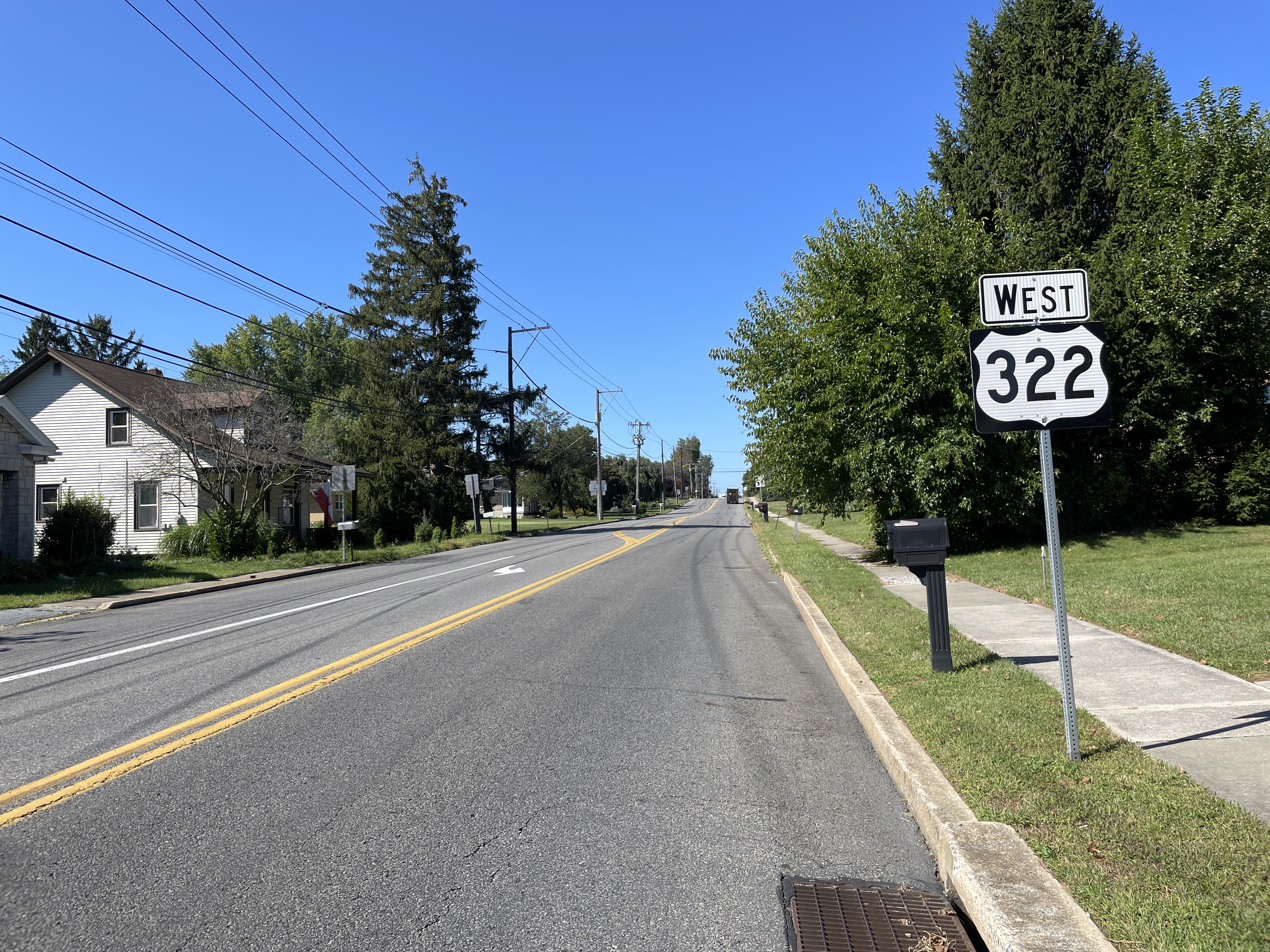
US 322 westbound past PA 743 in Hershey

US 322 heads east along with I-81 on a six-lane freeway that is part of the Capital Beltway that circles Harrisburg. The freeway leaves the city limits of Harrisburg and runs through suburban areas. I-81/US 322 comes to a partial cloverleaf interchange with Progress Avenue before reaching a directional T interchange with the northern terminus of I-83. At this point, US 322 and the Capital Beltway split from I-81 by heading south along I-83. The four-lane freeway runs south-southeast to the east of Harrisburg, coming to a partial cloverleaf interchange with US 22 that serves the communities of Progress to the west and Colonial Park to the east. Past here, I-83/US 322 reaches a diamond interchange with Union Deposit Road. Farther south, US 322 splits from I-83 at a eastbound exit and westbound entrance and heads south along four-lane divided Eisenhower Boulevard, immediately coming to a partial cloverleaf interchange with Derry Street. The road passes under Norfolk Southern's Harrisburg Line and reaches the Eisenhower Interchange with connections to I-83, the northern terminus of I-283, and Paxton Street, where US 322 splits from Eisenhower Boulevard to head east along a four-lane freeway. The freeway heads near suburban areas with some industrial development and comes to an interchange with Penhar Drive. Past this interchange, the freeway ends and US 322 continues east as a four-lane divided highway. Farther east, the route becomes Paxton Street and it runs east. The road turns into an unnamed freeway and crosses the Swatara Creek, bypassing the borough of Hummelstown to the south. The freeway runs along the southern border of Hummelstown and passes between developed areas of the borough to the north and rural areas to the south, crossing the Middletown and Hummelstown Railroad at-grade. While bypassing Hummelstown, US 322 comes to a eastbound exit and westbound entrance with South Hanover Street/Middletown Road and a westbound exit and eastbound entrance with Quarry Road/Waltonville Road; a two-lane undivided frontage road to the south of US 322 connects these two interchanges. From here, the freeway curves northeast and leaves Hummelstown, reaching a partial cloverleaf interchange with the western terminus of the eastern segment of US 422 and the eastern terminus of PA 39. At this point, the freeway continues as US 422, which soon becomes an at-grade divided highway, while US 322 exits to continue east along West Governor Road, a three-lane road with a center left-turn lane. The road heads into the southern part of the community of Hershey and runs through developed areas, passing to the north of Penn State Milton S. Hershey Medical Center and Penn State Health Children's Hospital. The route narrows to two lanes before intersecting PA 743. US 322 becomes East Governor Road and heads between Hershey High School to the north and farmland to the south before passing through the campus of the Milton Hershey School, coming to roundabouts at Homestead Lane and Meadow Lane serving the school. The road leaves Hershey and runs through agricultural areas in the Lebanon Valley.

US 322 enters Lebanon County and becomes Horseshoe Pike, where it heads into the community of Campbelltown. On the eastern edge of Campbelltown, the route crosses PA 117. From here, the road passes through the communities of Mount Pleasant and Fontana. US 322 comes to a junction with PA 241, where that route turns east to join US 322 in a concurrency. A short distance later, the road has an intersection with the southern terminus of PA 934. The two routes continue east, with PA 241 splitting from US 322 by turning to the north. US 322 has a junction with the southern terminus of PA 419 west of the community of Quentin, where it curves to the southeast. The route turns into a freeway as it reaches a westbound exit and eastbound entrance with PA 72, where PA 72 becomes concurrent with US 322. The four-lane freeway enters the borough of Cornwall and comes to an interchange with the southern terminus of PA 117, passing over the Lebanon Valley Rail Trail at this interchange. The freeway runs through rural areas, with PA 72 splitting at an interchange to head south. US 322 heads east as a two-lane undivided expressway as it traverses South Mountain. Farther east, the expressway ends and the route becomes two-lane undivided 28th Division Highway, curving southeast and leaving Cornwall.

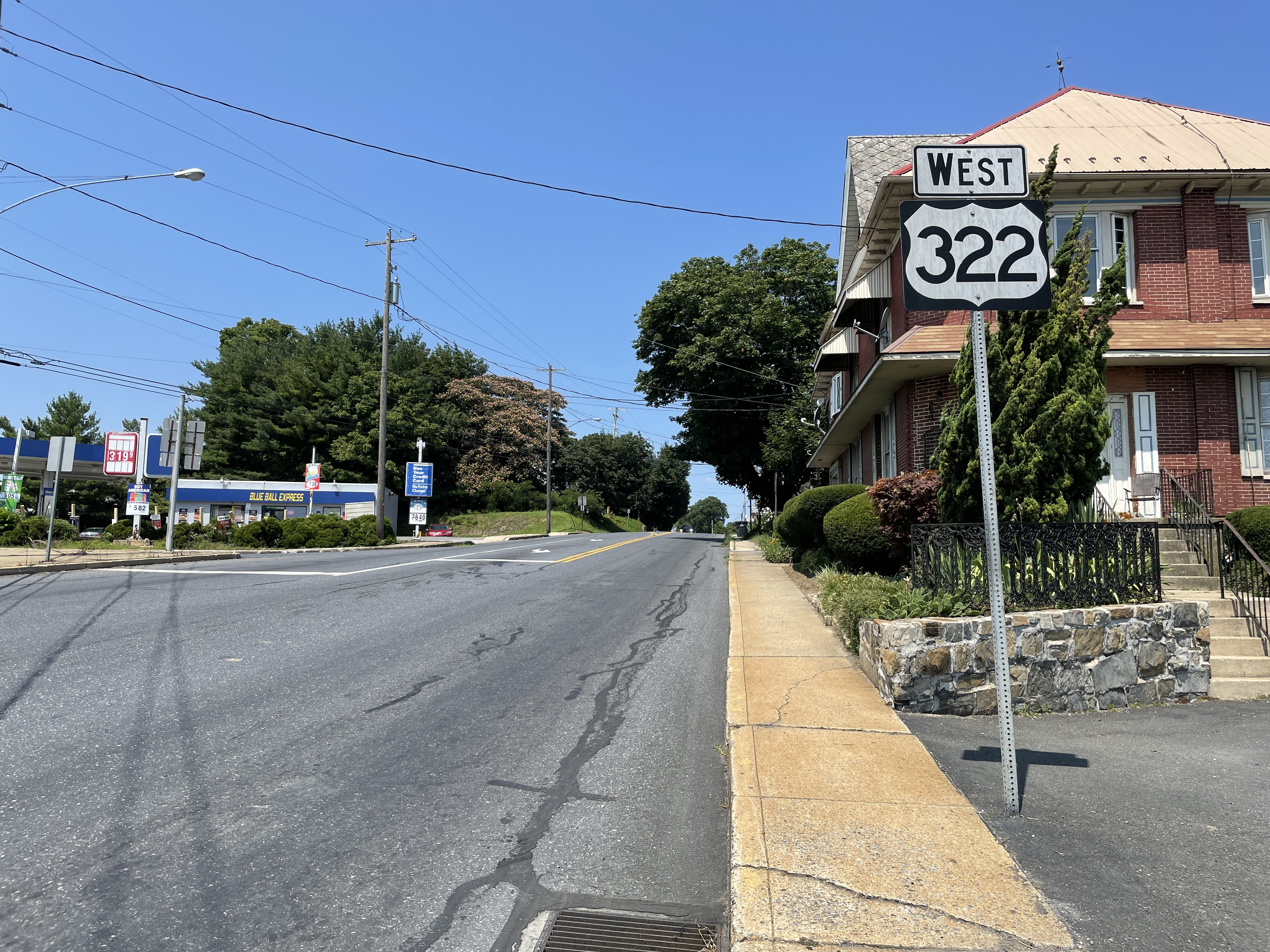
US 322 westbound past PA 23 in Blue Ball

US 322 enters Lancaster County and continues east across the mountain along West 28th Division Highway, turning to the southeast. After crossing South Mountain, the road passes over the Pennsylvania Turnpike (I-76) and runs through a mix of rural areas and development, intersecting PA 501 in the community of Brickerville. The route becomes East 28th Division Highway and continues east, crossing Middle Creek. At this point, the road name changes to West Main Street and it passes through the community of Clay. US 322 runs east-southeast and runs through the community of Weidmanville before it enters the borough of Ephrata. At this point, the route heads into developed areas and continues southeast to a cloverleaf interchange with PA 272, where it widens to four lanes. Past this interchange, the road narrows back to two lanes and passes northeast of the Ephrata Cloister before crossing Cocalico Creek. US 322 continues southeast into the downtown area of Ephrata and becomes East Main Street upon crossing State Street. A short distance later, the road meets the terminus of the Warwick to Ephrata Rail Trail. The route leaves the downtown area and continues southeast, crossing out of the borough limits of Ephrata and running east-southeast past more development. US 322 widens into a four-lane divided highway and comes to a diverging diamond interchange with the US 222 freeway. Following the US 222 interchange, the road becomes two-lane undivided Division Highway continues southeastward through the Pennsylvania Dutch Country of eastern Lancaster County, which is home to many Amish farms. The route crosses the Conestoga River and passes through the community of Hinkletown. Farther southeast, US 322 runs through the community of Reidenbach before it reaches the community of Blue Ball, where it has an intersection with PA 23. The road runs near some development and forms a short concurrency with PA 897. From here, the route continues east through agricultural areas, passing through the communities of Fetterville and Beartown. At this point, US 322 travels east-southeast across Welsh Mountain.

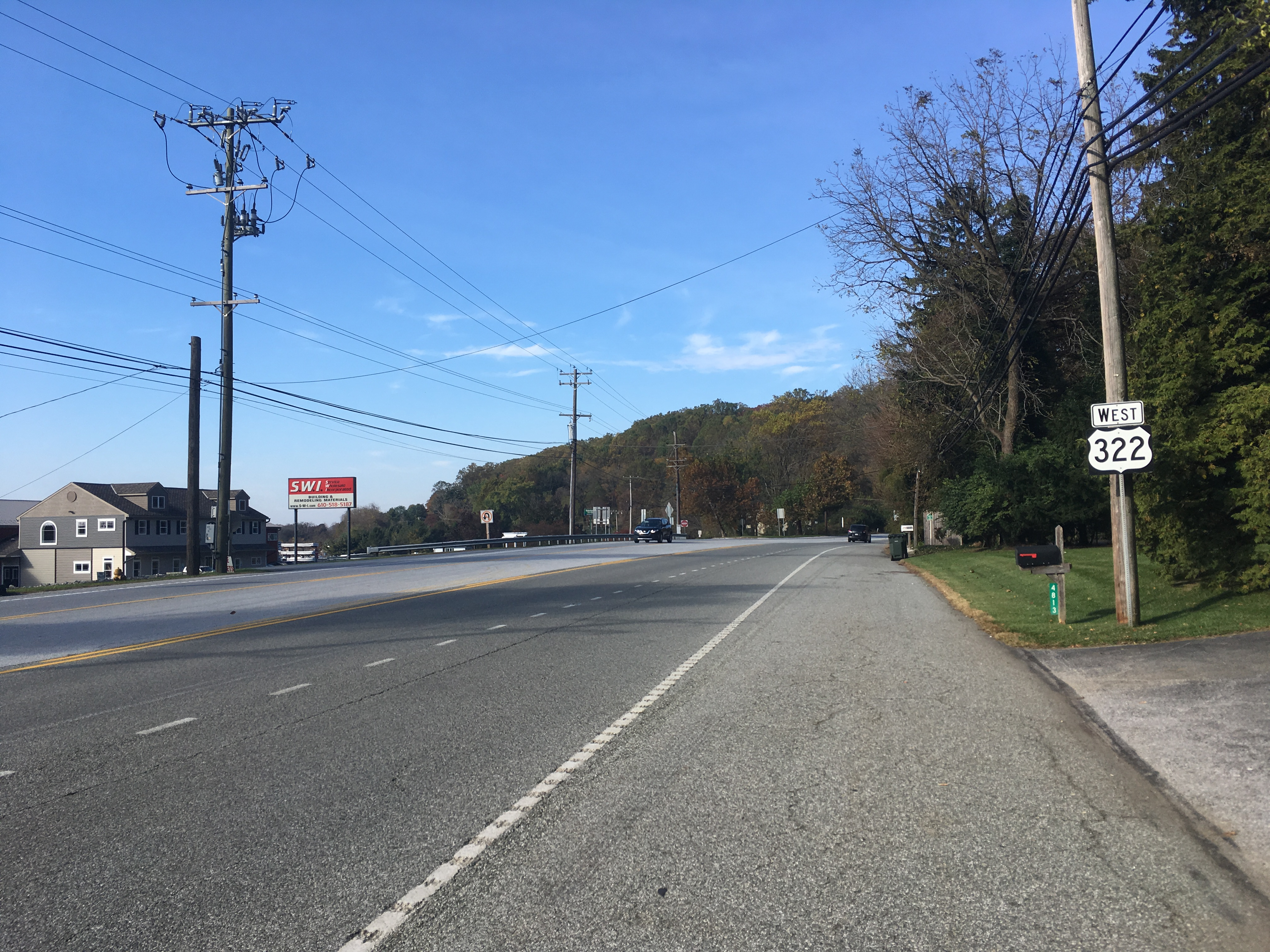
US 322 westbound past the US 30 interchange near Downingtown

US 322 enters Chester County and becomes Horseshoe Pike, continuing southeast through rural areas to the borough of Honey Brook. At this point, the route runs southeast through the borough, where it intersects PA 10. Upon leaving Honey Brook, the road continues through rural areas with increasing development, crossing the West Branch Brandywine Creek. Farther southeast, US 322 reaches an intersection with PA 82 in the community of Brandywine Manor. From here, the route runs southeast through suburban areas with some rural land, passing through the communities of Little Washington and Guthriesville. The road comes to a partial cloverleaf interchange with the US 30 freeway, where it briefly becomes a divided highway. Past this interchange, US 322 passes north of a park and ride lot and becomes Manor Avenue, a three-lane road with a center left-turn lane that enters the borough of Downingtown. Here, the route passes through developed areas, heading to the south of Downingtown West High School, and narrows to two lanes before coming to an intersection with US 30 Bus. At this point, US 322 turns northeast for a concurrency with US 30 Bus. on West Lancaster Avenue, crossing the East Branch Brandywine Creek and heading in the downtown area of Downingtown on East Lancaster Avenue. US 322 splits from US 30 Bus. by turning south onto Brandywine Avenue, with US 322 Truck heading east along with US 30 Bus. The route passes under Amtrak's Keystone Corridor railroad line and intersects the other end of US 322 Truck at Boot Road along the southern border of Downingtown. From here, the road curves southeast and passes over the East Branch Brandywine Creek and under the abandoned Brandywine Valley Viaduct. At this point, US 322 becomes Downingtown Pike and runs parallel to the creek through a mix of rural and suburban areas. The route turns east and crosses the creek, at which point the East Branch Brandywine Creek turns south away from the road.

US 322 widens to four lanes and turns east onto the West Chester Bypass, a two-lane expressway. US 322 Bus. continues southeast along Downingtown Pike toward the borough of West Chester. The route follows the bypass east-northeast through suburban areas to the north of West Chester, coming to an at-grade intersection with North New Street, then a westbound exit to northbound Pottstown Pike (the former routing of PA 100) and eastbound entrance from southbound Pottstown Pike. The road continues northeast and curves east as it comes to an at-grade intersection with Phoenixville Pike (the former routing of PA 29), then passes under an abandoned railroad line before merging into the southbound direction of the US 202 freeway at a partial interchange. US 202/US 322 continues south-southeast along the West Chester Bypass as a four-lane freeway bypassing West Chester to the east, coming to a partial cloverleaf interchange with Paoli Pike. A short distance later, the two routes reach a partial cloverleaf interchange with PA 3. The bypass continues south to a diamond interchange at Westtown Road before it curves southwest, passing over the West Chester Railroad. The freeway portion of the bypass then ends at an at-grade intersection with South Matlack Street. Following this, the bypass continues to its terminus at a trumpet interchange with the eastern terminus of US 322 Bus., which heads north (west) into West Chester on South High Street, providing access to the campus of West Chester University. At this point, US 202/US 322 exit and head southeast along four-lane divided Wilmington Pike, passing through suburban areas. The road comes to a jughandle-controlled intersection at Stetson Middle School Drive/Skiles Boulevard before it crosses PA 926 in the community of Darlington Corners.

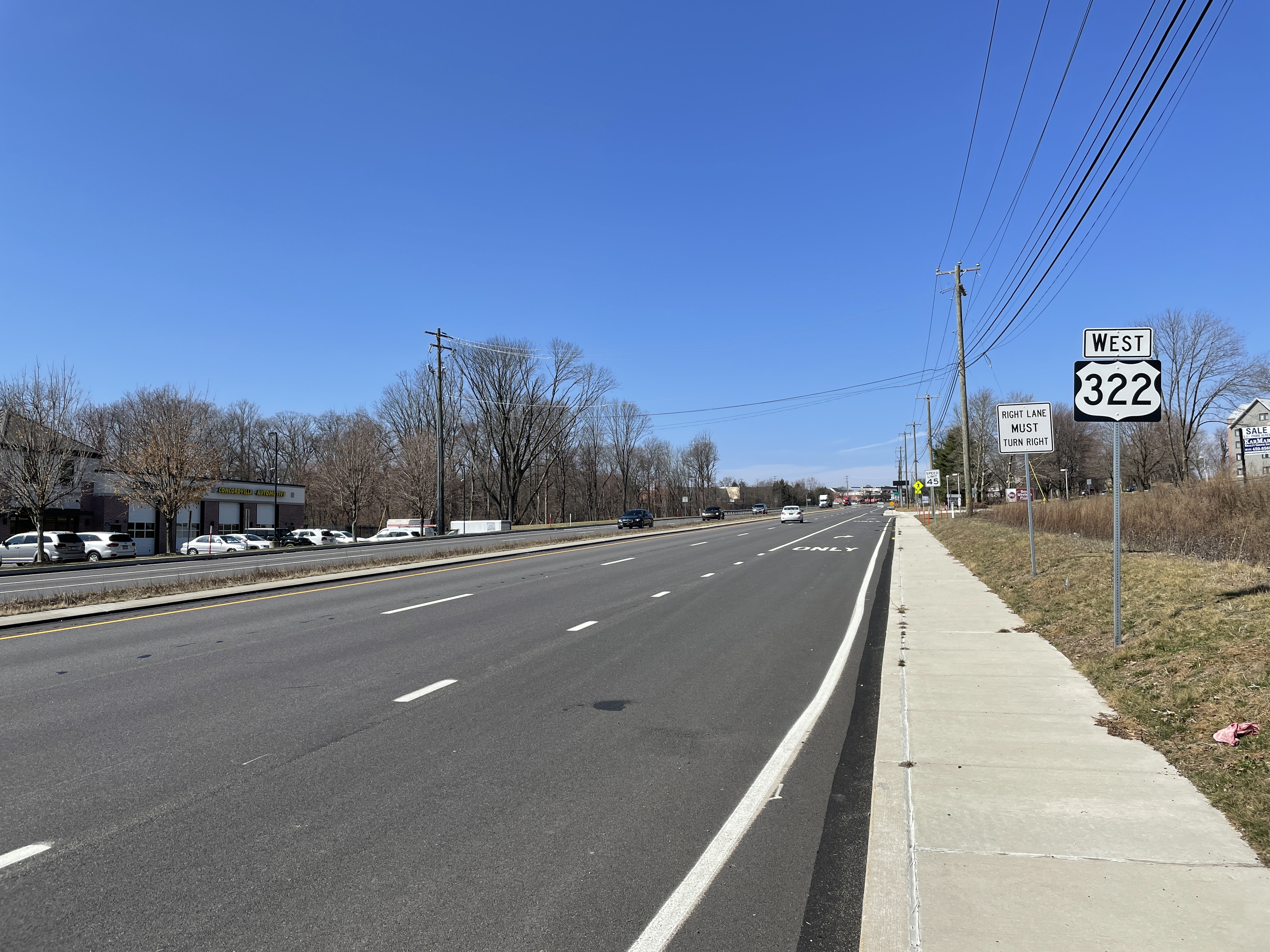
US 322 westbound along Conchester Highway in Concordville

US 202/US 322 crosses into Delaware County and continues southeast along Wilmington-West Chester Pike, coming to an intersection with Oakland Road that has an eastbound jughandle. The road comes to the community of Painters Crossing and reaches an intersection with US 1, where US 322 splits from US 202 by heading east along with US 1 on four-lane divided Baltimore Pike. The road continues east to the community of Concordville, where US 322 splits from US 1 by heading southeast along Conchester Highway, a four-lane divided highway. The route runs through suburban areas, passing over Smithbridge Road and narrowing to a two-lane undivided road before coming to an interchange with the northern terminus of PA 261. The road continues east and passes over Chichester Avenue before it widens into a four-lane divided highway and reaches an interchange with PA 452. Farther east, US 322 passes over CSX's Philadelphia Subdivision railroad line and comes to an interchange with Bethel Road. The route passes north of CSX's Twin Oaks Rail Yard, an automotive unloading facility, before it comes to an interchange with I-95 and Highland Avenue. At this interchange, US 322 merges onto northbound I-95; this interchange consists of full access between US 322 and Highland Avenue and partial access between US 322 and I-95. At this point, US 322 joins I-95 on the Delaware Expressway, a seven-lane freeway with four northbound lanes and three southbound lanes and enters the city of Chester, passing through urban areas. The freeway leaves the city limits and US 322 splits from I-95 to head southeast on a freeway at a directional T interchange; this interchange includes a ramp from westbound US 322 to Concord Road. The route crosses back into Chester as it follows a five-lane freeway with three eastbound lanes and two westbound lanes that is maintained by the Delaware River Port Authority. The freeway comes to a westbound exit and eastbound entrance with US 13 Bus. before it passes over Amtrak's Northeast Corridor railroad line and reaches an eastbound exit and westbound entrance with US 13/PA 291. At this point, US 322 heads onto the Commodore Barry Bridge, passing over Conrail Shared Assets Operations' Chester Industrial Track line and running to the northeast of Subaru Park, the home stadium of the Philadelphia Union of Major League Soccer, before it crosses the Delaware River into New Jersey.

== History ==
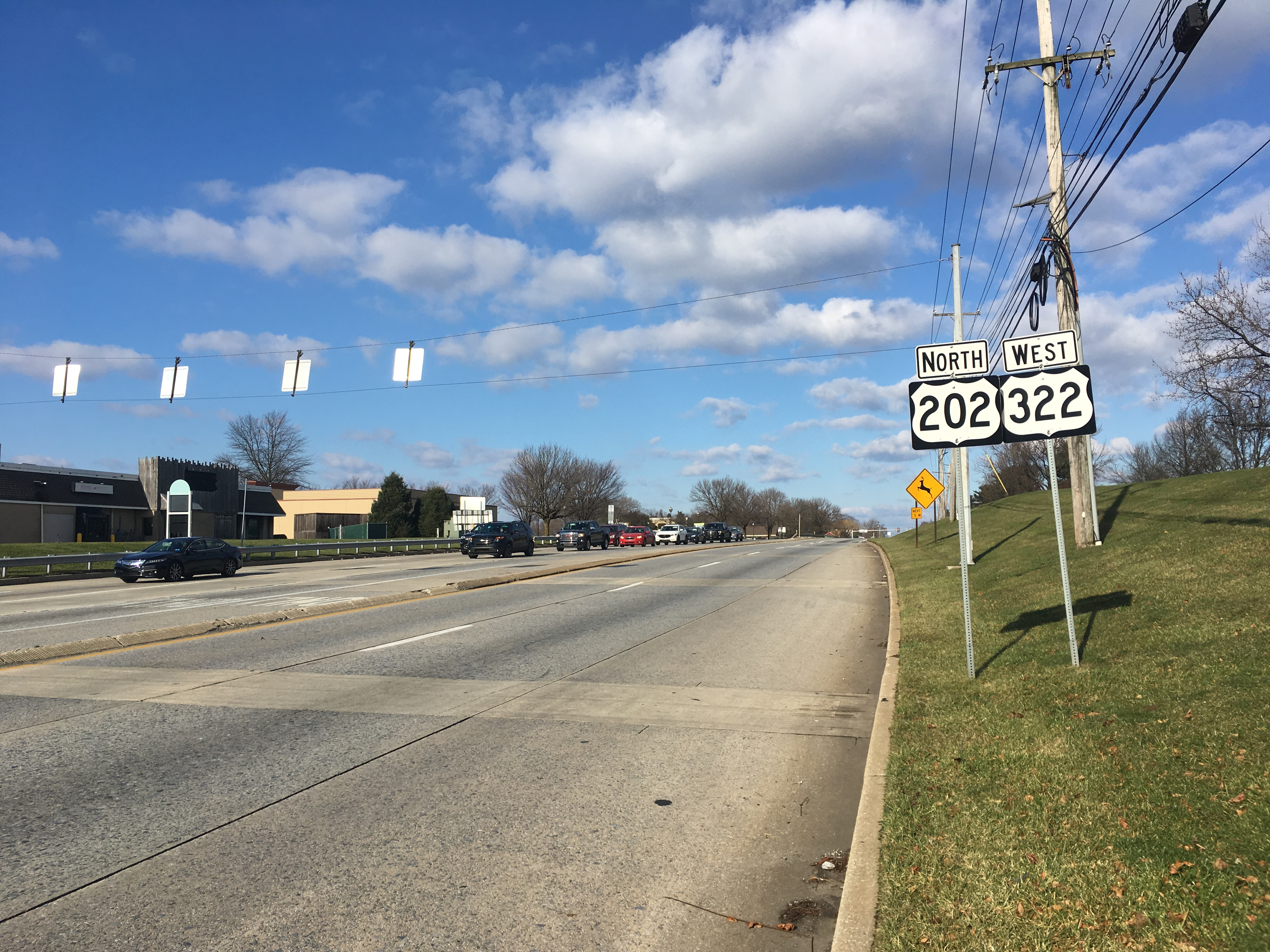
US 202 northbound/US 322 westbound past US 1 in Painters Crossing

The earliest predecessors of US 322 were several turnpikes. The Downingtown, Ephrata, and Harrisburg Turnpike was chartered in 1803, forming the bulk of the highway east of Harrisburg. A brief section from Philipsburg to West Decatur was part of the Philipsburg and Susquehanna Turnpike, with a western terminus at Curwensville. From there to Meadville, the highway was the Susquehanna and Waterford Turnpike, which extended north to Waterford. The latter two turnpikes were part of the cross-state route known as the Northumberland and Waterford Turnpike.

These highways were mostly incorporated into the Lakes-to-Sea Highway, which went from Erie east to Atlantic City, New Jersey. This route deviated from the early turnpikes in central Pennsylvania, by swinging south from DuBois along US 219 to service Grampian, then north on PA 879 to service Clearfield. From Philipsburg, it followed PA 53 to Osceola Mills and State Street and PA 350 to Bald Eagle. It then went south along South Bald Eagle Road (at the time also US 220) to Tyrone, then PA 453 and PA 45 meet US 22 at Water Street. The two highways bore a concurrency to Harrisburg. At the time of their marking, both highways swung north from Mill Creek, following PA 655 to Reedsville, then south to Lewistown, where they resumed the modern alignment. From West Chester, the highway followed PA 3 to Philadelphia. This highway was numbered as PA 5 in the earliest numbering system in the state.

US 322, in its original inception in 1926, followed PA 5 from Water Street to Meadville, where it continued west on its modern alignment. Both US 22 and US 322 followed their modern alignments east of Lewistown.

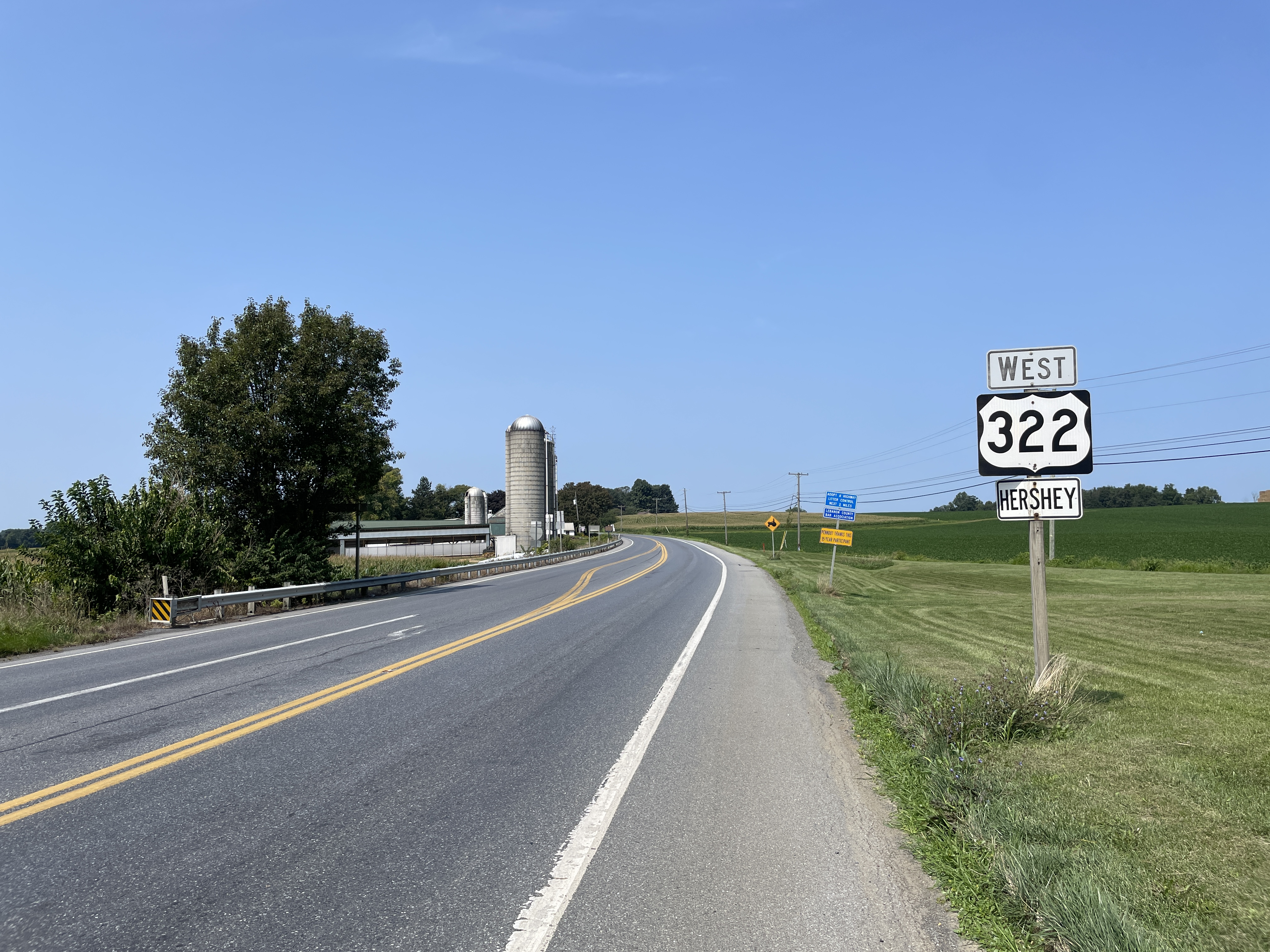
US 322 westbound past PA 419 in West Cornwall Township

In 1928, concurrencies with this highway and its PA 5 moniker were deleted in favor of the national number. In 1937, US 322 was extended to and through New Jersey, replacing what remained of PA 5 between Harrisburg and West Chester, and PA 61 to Chester.

In 1933, the eastern terminus was moved from Water Street to Lewistown.

In 1935, the highway was opened from the Ohio state line to the Mercer County line.

In 1936, the highway was paved from Union Road to Pitts Road. In addition, the terminus was extended to the New Jersey state line.

Numerous widening projects were undertaken in 1938.

In 1950, widening from Amity Hall to the current PA 849 intersection was competed.

In 1953, the highway was widened in various spots.

The section of US 322 along Conchester Highway between US 1 in Concordville and I-95 in Chester opened in 1954.

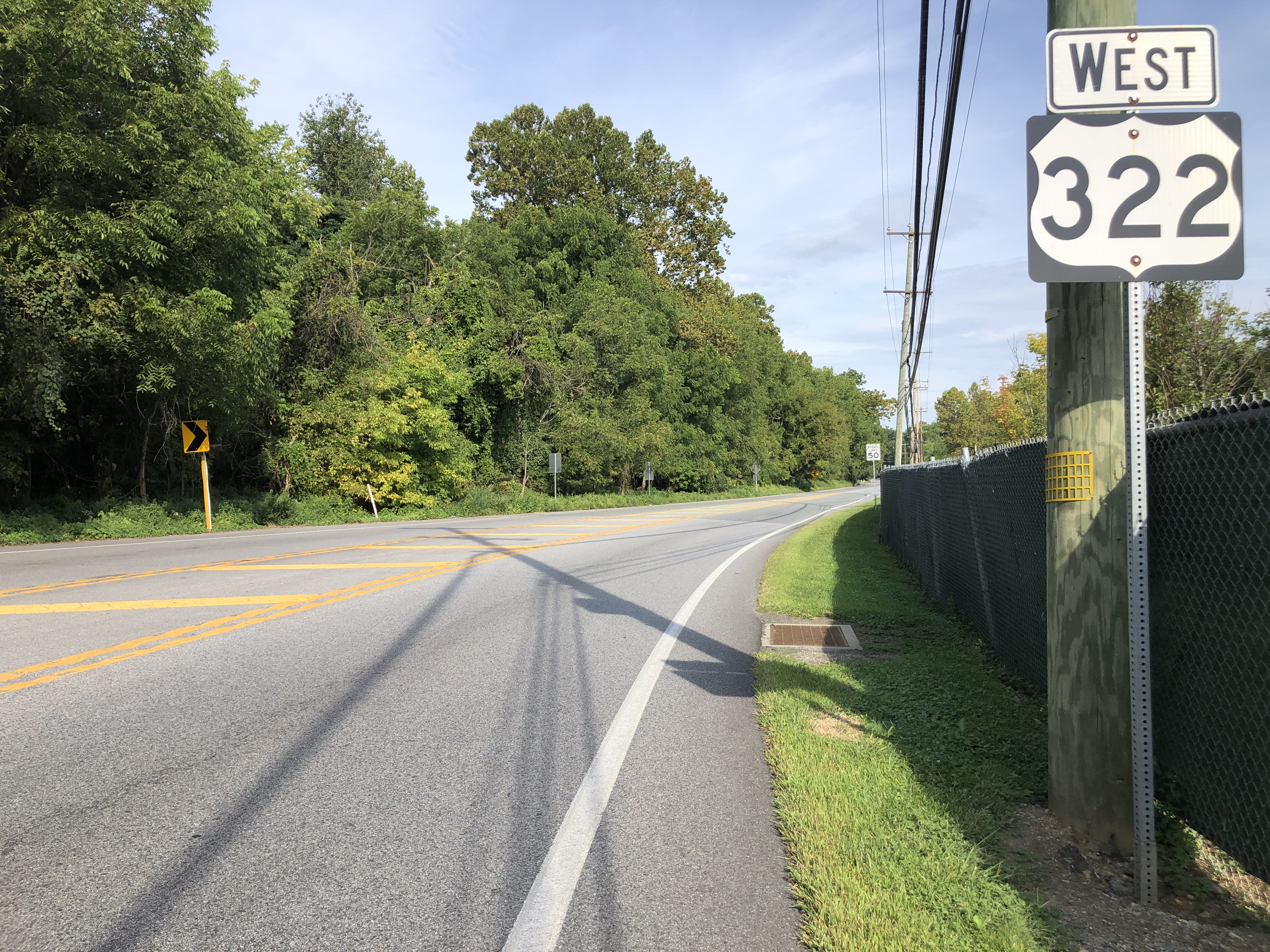
US 322 westbound in West Bradford Township

In 1957, the West Chester Bypass was constructed, which routed US 322 around the borough of West Chester to the north and east, then terminating south of the borough. As a result, US 322 Bus. replaced the US 322 designation through downtown West Chester. The bypass was originally constructed as a limited-access two-lane highway with a mix of at-grade intersections and graded interchanges, with bridges and overpasses built to accommodate a second carriageway for four lanes. In 1971, the US 202 freeway that ran to King of Prussia had been completed, which connected to the West Chester Bypass northeast of the borough and routed US 202 with US 322 on a concurrency through the remainder of the bypass. As a result, the segment of the bypass from the US 202 connection to its terminus south of the borough was widened to four lanes, and all at-grade intersections on this segment were either removed or converted to graded interchanges, with the exception of the intersection with Matlack Street. The segment of the bypass from the US 202 connection to Downingtown Pike northwest of the borough remains a two-lane expressway with some at-grade interchanges, along with a freeway-grade speed limit of 55 mph (89 km/h).

In 1959, a median was installed from the West Chester Bypass to US 1.

In 1970, the highway was rerouted to bypass Curwensville to the north, replacing a section of PA 410.

In 1970, the designation was realigned to its current alignment between Luthersburg and Clearfield.

In 1974, much of the road near New Jersey was routed onto limited access expressways onto the Commordore Barry Bridge, replacing a ferry.

In 1975, the Mount Nittany Expressway was opened between Macedonia and the Pfautz Valley Road interchange opened. In 1976, the section was opened of I-81 from Cameron Street to Progress Avenue. By 1985, the rest of the road was opened, completing the work.

In 1984, the Hummelestown Bypass was upgraded into an expressway. This followed with the Cornwall Bypass in 1991. And a few other sections in 2000.

Construction began on the Arch Rock interchange to upgrade it from a half-diamond to full-diamond interchange to provide access for both directions in April 2002 and was completed in Fall 2003.

The $19.1 million rehabilitation of the interchange with Business US 22 began in early 2003 and finished in 2005. It included roadway widening.

In December 2007, construction to convert the section of US 22/US 322 through the Lewistown Narrows from a two-lane highway to a divided, limited-access four-lane highway was completed.

In 2011, construction was completed on improvements to the Commodore Barry Bridge approach.

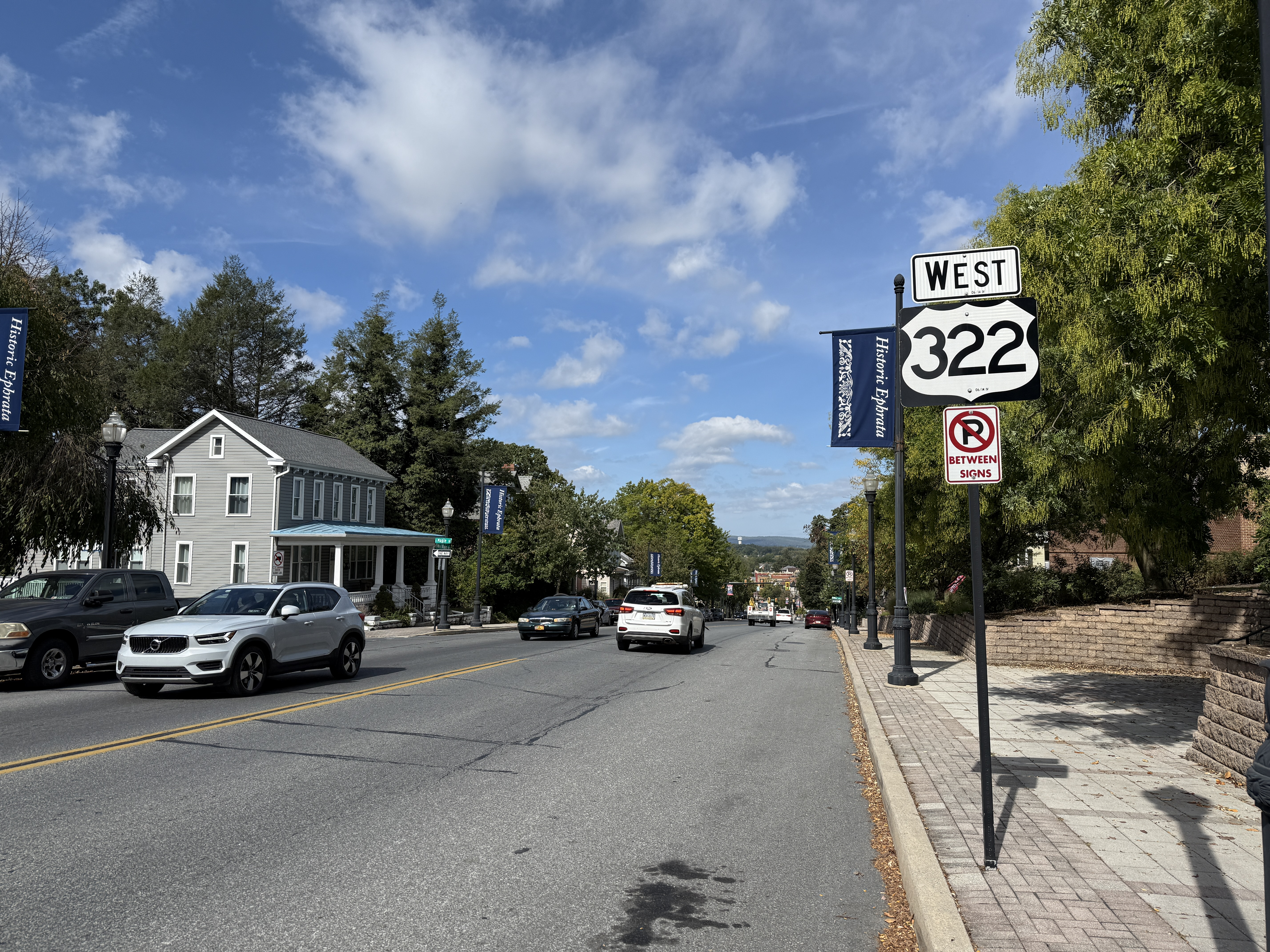
US 322 westbound in Ephrata

To decrease congestion and improve safety, the Pennsylvania Department of Transportation (PennDOT) began a project in 2014 to reconstruct US 322 from the Centre/Mifflin county line to the route's interchange with PA 144, at a cost of about $93 million. On March 30, 2018, the Sand Mountain Road interchange opened, replacing the at-grade intersection. The bulk of the cost of the project is related to an extension of the four-lane portion of US 322 through Potters Mills Gap and a new interchange with PA 144, which opened on October 10, 2020.

In 2019, construction began to convert the interchange with US 222 near Ephrata into a diverging diamond interchange. The diverging diamond interchange, which cost $10.9 million and received federal funding, opened on May 17, 2021, one year ahead of schedule.

The State College Area Connector project will upgrade US 322 to four lanes between the eastern terminus of the Mount Nittany Expressway and the PA 144 interchange. On August 9, 2023, three build alternatives for the project were released, with proposals to construct along the PA 144 corridor and upgrade the existing alignment of US 322 eliminated. On January 19, 2024, it was announced that plans to build a connector road to PA 45 were dropped.

PennDOT had plans since 1979 to widen the stretch of US 322 along Conchester Highway from a two-lane road to a four-lane road. The stretch of road saw a large number of accidents and fatalities, leading to the nickname "Killer Conchester". Construction on the project to widen the Conchester Highway section of US 322 began on April 28, 2017, with Governor Tom Wolf, PennDOT secretary Leslie Richards, and other state and local officials in attendance for a groundbreaking ceremony. Construction on the first phase of the widening between US 1 and Clayton Park Drive started in 2017 and was completed in December 2020. Plans to widen US 322 between Clayton Park Drive and east of Chelsea Parkway/Bethel Avenue are in the final design phase, with construction to begin in 2025. Plans to reconstruct the four-lane section of US 322 from Cherry Tree Road/Bethel Avenue to east of PA 452 are in the final design phase, with construction to begin in 2024. Plans to replace the bridge over the CSX tracks and Bethel Road along with improving the Bethel Road interchange are in the final design phase, with construction to begin in 2024.

== Major intersections ==
County	Location	mi	km	Exit	Destinations	Notes
Crawford	West Shenango Township	0.00	0.00		US 322 west – Cleveland	Ohio state line
Mercer	Jamestown	5.3	8.5		PA 58 west (Jamestown-Kinsman Road) – Kinsman	West end of PA 58 concurrency
Mercer	Jamestown	5.6	9.0		PA 58 east (Liberty Street) – Greenville	East end of PA 58 concurrency
Crawford	West Fallowfield Township	12.0	19.3		PA 18 south (Main Street) – Greenville	West end of PA 18 concurrency
Crawford	Conneaut Lake	17.3	27.8		US 6 west / PA 285 west (Water Street)	West end of US 6/PA 285 concurrency
Crawford	Conneaut Lake	17.4	28.0		PA 285 east (3rd Street)	East end of PA 285 concurrency
Crawford	Sadsbury Township	18.3	29.5		PA 18 north – Conneautville, Girard	East end of PA 18 concurrency
Crawford	Vernon Township	22.9	36.9		US 19 south (Perry Highway) / PA 98 – Fairview, Mercer	Roundabout; west end of US 19 concurrency; southern terminus of PA 98
Crawford	Vernon Township	24.1	38.8		I-79 – Pittsburgh, Erie	I-79 exit 147
Crawford	Vernon Township	24.7	39.8		PA 102 north (Pennsylvania Avenue)	Southern terminus of PA 102
Crawford	Meadville	25.8	41.5		US 6 east / US 19 north (French Creek Parkway) to PA 27	East end of US 6/US 19 concurrency
Crawford	Wayne Township	36.1	58.1		PA 173 – Cochranton	
Mercer	No major junctions					
Venango	Sugarcreek	46.2	74.4		PA 427 north – Cooperstown	Southern terminus of PA 427
Venango	Franklin–Sugarcreek line	51.8	83.4		PA 417 north (Rocky Grove Avenue)	Southern terminus of PA 417
Venango	Franklin	52.3	84.2		US 62 south / PA 8 south (Liberty Street)	West end of US 62/PA 8 concurrency
Venango	Franklin	52.7	84.8		US 62 north / PA 8 north (Washington Crossing)	East end of US 62/PA 8 concurrency
Venango	Cranberry Township	60.0	96.6		PA 257 north – Oil City	Southern terminus of PA 257
Venango	Rockland Township	65.3	105.1		PA 38 south – Emlenton	Northern terminus of PA 38
Clarion	Ashland Township	68.9	110.9		PA 338 west to I-80 west – Knox	Eastern terminus of PA 338
Clarion	Shippenville	75.3	121.2		PA 208 west (Railroad Street) – Knox, Emlenton	West end of PA 208 concurrency
Clarion	Shippenville	75.5	121.5		PA 208 east (School Street) – Fryburg, Tionesta	East end of PA 208 concurrency
Clarion	Paint Township	77.4	124.6		PA 66 (Paint Boulevard) to I-80 – Leeper, Cook Forest, New Bethlehem	
Clarion	Clarion	80.5	129.6		PA 68 west (5th Avenue) to I-80 – East Brady	Eastern terminus of PA 68
Clarion	Clarion Township	88.4	142.3		I-80 – DuBois, Sharon	I-80 exit 70
Jefferson	Corsica	90.7	146.0		PA 949 north (Olean Road) to I-80 – Sigel	West end of PA 949 concurrency
Jefferson	Corsica				PA 949 south (Summerville-Corsica Road) – Summerville	East end of PA 949 concurrency
Jefferson	Brookville	96.3	155.0		PA 28 south / PA 36 north / PA 28 Truck north (Allegheny Boulevard) to I-80 – Leeper, New Bethlehem	West end of PA 28/PA 36 concurrency
Jefferson	Brookville	97.1	156.3		PA 36 south (White Street) – Punxsutawney	East end of PA 36 concurrency
Jefferson	Pine Creek Township	98.3	158.2		PA 28 north to I-80 – Hazen, Brockway	East end of PA 28 concurrency
Jefferson	Reynoldsville	109.0	175.4		PA 950 north (Broadway Street) – Falls Creek	Southern terminus of PA 950
Jefferson	Reynoldsville	109.5	176.2		PA 310 south (5th Street) – Punxsutawney	Northern terminus of PA 310
Clearfield	Sandy Township	115.5	185.9		US 119 (Blinker Parkway) – DuBois, Punxsutawney	
Clearfield	Brady Township	117.0	188.3		US 219 north (Watson Highway) – DuBois	West end of US 219 concurrency
Clearfield	Brady Township	119.8	192.8		PA 410 west (Shamokin Trail) – Punxsutawney	Eastern terminus of PA 410
Clearfield	Brady Township	119.9	193.0		US 219 south (Coal Hill Road) – Curwensville	East end of US 219 concurrency
Clearfield	Pine Township	130.6	210.2		PA 153 north (State Park Road) to I-80 – Ridgway	West end of PA 153 concurrency
Clearfield	Clearfield	136.7	220.0		PA 153 south (2nd Street) – Curwensville	East end of PA 153 concurrency
Clearfield	Lawrence Township	138.2	222.4		PA 879 (Clearfield Shawville Highway) to I-80 – Curwensville, Karthaus	Interchange
Clearfield	Bradford Township	142.8	229.8		PA 970 north (Shawville Highway) to I-80 – Shawville	Southern terminus of PA 970
Clearfield	Decatur Township	153.0	246.2		PA 53 north (Troy Hawk Run Highway) to I-80 east – Kylertown	West end of PA 53 concurrency
Centre	Rush Township–Philipsburg line	153.2	246.6		PA 53 south (North Centre Street) to PA 350 – Tyrone, Coalport	East end of PA 53 concurrency
Centre	Philipsburg	154.2	248.2		PA 504 (Presqueisle Street) to PA 350 – Unionville	
Centre	Worth Township				Reese Hollow Road/East Mountain Road	Westbound interchange; eastbound at-grade intersection
Centre	Worth Township			West end of freeway		
Centre	Worth Township				To I-99 south / US 220 south – Altoona, Port Matilda	Eastbound exit and westbound entrance; access via North High Street
Centre	Worth Township	165.4	266.2		I-99 south / US 220 south – Altoona	West end of I-99/US 220 concurrency; westbound exit and eastbound entrance; I-99 exit 62
Centre	Patton Township	171.4	275.8	68	Grays Woods, Waddle	Access via Grays Woods Boulevard
Centre	Patton Township	172.2	277.1	69	US 322 Bus. east (Atherton Street)	Eastbound exit and westbound entrance; western terminus of US 322 Bus.
Centre	Patton Township	172.4	277.5	69	Valley Vista Drive – Park Forest	Westbound exit and eastbound entrance
Centre	Patton Township	173.2	278.7	71	Toftrees, Woodycrest	Access via Waddle Road
Centre	College Township	175.8	282.9	—	I-99 north / US 220 north to I-80 – Bellefonte	East end of I-99/US 220 concurrency; I-99 exit 73
Centre	College Township	176.1	283.4	—	Innovation Park, Penn State University	Access via Park Avenue; access to Beaver Stadium and Bryce Jordan Center
Centre	College Township	177.4	285.5	—	PA 26 (PA 144 Truck north) – State College	West end of PA 144 Truck concurrency
Centre	College Township			—	PA 45 west – Oak Hall, Boalsburg, Lemont	Access via Boalsburg Road/Warner Boulevard; PA 45 and Boalsburg signed eastbound; Lemont signed westbound
Centre	Harris Township	180.0	289.7	—	PA 45 east – Old Fort	Eastbound exit and westbound entrance; access to Whipple Dam State Park
Centre	Harris Township	180.0	289.7	East end of freeway		
Centre	Harris Township	181.2	291.6		US 322 Bus. west (Atherton Street) – Boalsburg	Interchange; westbound exit and eastbound entrance; eastern terminus of US 322 Bus.
Centre	Potter Township	189.7	305.3		To PA 144 north – Potters Mills PA 144 Truck ends	Interchange; access via Old Route 322; east end of PA 144 Truck concurrency
Centre	Potter Township				Sand Mountain Road	Interchange; access to Poe Valley State Park and Poe Paddy State Park
Mifflin	Armagh Township				West end of freeway	
Mifflin	Armagh Township	198.4	319.3		Milroy	Access via Old US Hwy 322; access to Reeds Gap State Park
Mifflin	Brown Township	200.9	323.3		PA 655 – Belleville, Reedsville	Access to Mifflin County Airport
Mifflin	Derry Township	204.2	328.6		Burnham, Yeagertown	Access via Ferguson Valley Road
Mifflin	Derry Township	205.3	330.4		US 22 west / US 522 south – Mt. Union	West end of US 22/US 522 concurrency
Mifflin	Derry Township	205.5	330.7		Electric Avenue	Eastbound exit from US 22/US 522 exit
Mifflin	Lewistown	206.1	331.7		US 522 north (Walnut Street) – Selinsgrove	East end of US 522 concurrency
Mifflin	Derry Township	206.6	332.5		East Charles Street	Eastbound exit and westbound entrance
Mifflin	Derry Township	208.4	335.4		US 22 Bus. west – Lewistown	Westbound exit and eastbound entrance; eastern terminus of US 22 Bus.
Juniata	Fermanagh Township				Fishing/Boating Access Area	Eastbound exit and entrance
Juniata	Fermanagh Township	216.0	347.6		Arch Rock Road	Access to Mifflintown Airport
Juniata	Fermanagh Township	219.2	352.8		PA 35 – McAlisterville, Mifflintown	
Juniata	Walker Township	221.1	355.8		PA 75 south – Port Royal	Northern terminus of PA 75
Juniata	Delaware Township–Thompsontown line	228.9	368.4		PA 333 – East Salem, Thompsontown	
Juniata	Delaware Township	230.4	370.8		Pfoutz Valley Road	Westbound exit and eastbound entrance
Perry	Greenwood Township	234.2	376.9		To PA 17 – Millerstown	Access via West Juniata Parkway
Perry	Howe Township	238.7	384.2		PA 34 – Newport, New Bloomfield	Access to Little Buffalo State Park
Perry	Buffalo Township	242.5	390.3		Midway	Westbound exit and eastbound entrance; access via Meadow Grove Road
Perry	Watts Township	245.1	394.5		Watts	Left exit eastbound; right exit westbound; access via Huggins Road
Perry	Watts Township	247.0	397.5		Amity Hall	Westbound exit and entrance; access via River Road
Dauphin	Reed Township	247.2	397.8		US 11 / US 15 – Camp Hill, Selinsgrove, Williamsport	Williamsport signed westbound
Dauphin	Reed Township				East end of freeway	
Dauphin	Reed Township	248.6	400.1		PA 849 west – Duncannon	Eastern terminus of PA 849; no access from PA 849 to westbound US 22/US 322
Dauphin	Reed Township				West end of freeway	
Dauphin	Susquehanna River				Clarks Ferry Bridge	
Dauphin	Reed Township	249.0	400.7		PA 147 north – Halifax	Southern terminus of PA 147
Dauphin	Middle Paxton Township	251.0	403.9		PA 325 east (Mountain Road)	Western terminus of PA 325
Dauphin	Middle Paxton Township	254.4	409.4		PA 225 north – Halifax, Dauphin	Dauphin signed eastbound; southern terminus of PA 225
Dauphin	Dauphin	255.4	411.0		Dauphin Boro, Stony Creek	Westbound exit; access via Allegheny Street
Dauphin	Middle Paxton Township	256.8	413.3		PA 443 – Fishing Creek, Rockville	Rockville signed eastbound
Dauphin	Susquehanna Township–Harrisburg line	258.7	416.3		PA 39 – Linglestown, Rockville	Rockville signed westbound
Dauphin	Harrisburg	260.7	419.6		I-81 south (Capital Beltway) – Carlisle US 22 east (Cameron Street) to PA 230 – Harrisburg	Interchange; west end of I-81 concurrency; east end of US 22 concurrency; I-81 exit 67
Dauphin	Susquehanna Township	262.3	422.1	69	Progress Avenue	Exit number follows I-81
Dauphin	Lower Paxton Township	263.3	423.7	51B	I-81 north to I-78 – Hazleton, Allentown I-83 begins	Exit numbers follow I-83; east end of I-81 concurrency; northern terminus of I-83; west end of I-83 concurrency; I-81 exit 70, I-83 exit 51A
Dauphin	Lower Paxton Township	264.0	424.9	50	US 22 (Jonestown Road)	
Dauphin	Lower Paxton Township	265.2	426.8	48	Union Deposit Road	
Dauphin	Swatara Township	266.6	429.1	—	I-83 south (Capital Beltway) – Harrisburg, York	East end of I-83 concurrency; eastbound left exit and westbound left entrance; I-83 exit 47
Dauphin	Swatara Township			—	Derry Street	
Dauphin	Swatara Township			—	To I-83 south / Paxton Street	Eastbound exit only
Dauphin	Swatara Township			—	Eisenhower Boulevard	Eastbound left exit and westbound left entrance
Dauphin	Swatara Township			—	I-83 south (Capital Beltway) – Harrisburg	Westbound left exit and eastbound left entrance; I-83 exit 46B
Dauphin	Swatara Township			—	I-283 south to I-76 / Penna Turnpike – Harrisburg International Airport	Westbound left exit and eastbound entrance; I-283 exit 3C
Dauphin	Swatara Township	268.0	431.3	—	Penhar Drive	
Dauphin	Swatara Township	268.0	431.3	East end of freeway		
Dauphin	Swatara Township			West end of freeway		
Dauphin	Hummelstown–Derry Township line	272.9	439.2		Hummelstown, Middletown	Eastbound exit and westbound entrance via South Hanover Street/Middletown Road; westbound exit and eastbound entrance via Quarry Road/Waltonville Road
Dauphin	Derry Township	274.3	441.4		US 422 east – Hershey, Palmyra PA 39 west (Hersheypark Drive) – Attractions	Western terminus of eastern segment of US 422; eastern terminus of PA 39; no access from US 422 westbound to US 322 eastbound or from US 322 westbound to US 422 eastbound
Dauphin	Derry Township				East end of freeway	
Dauphin	Derry Township	276.4	444.8		PA 743 (Cocoa Avenue) to US 422	
Lebanon	South Londonderry Township	280.5	451.4		PA 117 (South Forge Road) – Palmyra, Colebrook	
Lebanon	South Annville Township	284.9	458.5		PA 241 south (Mt. Wilson Road) – Colebrook, Elizabethtown	West end of PA 241 concurrency
Lebanon	South Annville Township	285.1	458.8		PA 934 north (White Oak Street) – Annville	Southern terminus of PA 934
Lebanon	West Cornwall Township	285.9	460.1		PA 241 north (Colebrook Road) – Lebanon	East end of PA 241 concurrency
Lebanon	West Cornwall Township	287.2	462.2		PA 419 north (West Main Street) to PA 72 north – Lebanon, Quentin, Cornwall	Southern terminus of PA 419
Lebanon	West Cornwall Township				West end of freeway	
Lebanon	West Cornwall Township	288.0	463.5		PA 72 north – Lebanon	Westbound exit and eastbound entrance; west end of PA 72 concurrency
Lebanon	Cornwall	288.4	464.1		PA 117 north – Mount Gretna	Southern terminus of PA 117
Lebanon	Cornwall	289.1	465.3		PA 72 south to I-76 / Penna Turnpike – Lancaster	East end of PA 72 concurrency
Lebanon	Cornwall				East end of freeway	
Lancaster	Elizabeth Township	296.9	477.8		PA 501 (Furnace Hills Pike) – Schaefferstown, Lititz, Lancaster	
Lancaster	Ephrata	303.9	489.1		PA 272 – Reading, Akron, Lancaster	Interchange
Lancaster	Ephrata Township	306.4	493.1		US 222 to I-76 Toll – Reading, Lancaster	Diverging diamond interchange
Lancaster	East Earl Township	312.8	503.4		PA 23 – Morgantown, Lancaster	
Lancaster	East Earl Township	313.8	505.0		PA 897 north (Springville Road) – Terre Hill	West end of PA 897 concurrency
Lancaster	East Earl Township	313.9	505.2		PA 897 south (Springville Road) – White Horse	East end of PA 897 concurrency
Chester	Honey Brook	320.2	515.3		PA 10 (Conestoga Avenue / Pequea Avenue) – Morgantown, Compass, Parkesburg	
Chester	West Brandywine Township	326.0	524.6		PA 82 (Manor Road) – Elverson, Coatesville	
Chester	Caln Township	332.0	534.3		US 30 – Exton, Coatesville, Lancaster	Interchange
Chester	Downingtown	333.1	536.1		US 30 Bus. west (West Lancaster Avenue)	West end of US 30 Bus. concurrency
Chester	Downingtown	333.3	536.4		US 30 Bus. east / US 322 Truck east (East Lancaster Avenue) – Exton	East end of US 30 Bus. concurrency; western terminus of US 322 Truck
Chester	Downingtown–East Caln Township line	333.7	537.0		US 322 Truck west (Boot Road)	Eastern terminus of US 322 Truck
Chester	East Bradford Township	338.8	545.2		US 322 Bus. east (Downingtown Pike) to PA 162 – West Chester	Western terminus of US 322 Bus.
Chester	East Bradford Township	338.8	545.2		Western end of limited-access section	
Chester	West Goshen Township	339.6	546.5		North New Street to Pottstown Pike	At-grade intersection
Chester	West Goshen Township	339.9	547.0		Pottstown Pike north – Exton, Pottstown	Westbound exit and eastbound entrance; former PA 100
Chester	West Goshen Township	341.1	548.9		Phoenixville Pike – Frazer, Malvern	At-grade intersection; former PA 29
Chester	West Goshen Township	341.6	549.8		US 202 north – King of Prussia	Westbound exit and eastbound entrance; west end of US 202 concurrency
Chester	West Goshen Township	342.1	550.6		Paoli Pike	Former US 202
Chester	West Goshen Township	342.4	551.0		PA 3 (Gay Street) – Newtown Square	Gay Street not signed eastbound
Chester	West Goshen Township	343.2	552.3		Westtown Road	
Chester	West Goshen Township	344.0	553.6		Matlack Street	At-grade intersection
Chester	West Goshen Township	344.7	554.7		US 322 Bus. west (High Street)	Eastern terminus of US 322 Bus.; access to West Chester University
Chester	West Goshen Township	344.7	554.7		Eastern end of limited-access section	
Chester	Westtown–Thornbury township line	346.1	557.0		PA 926 (Street Road) – Cheyney, Pocopson	
Delaware	Chadds Ford–Concord township line	349.2	562.0		US 1 south (Baltimore Pike) – Kennett Square US 202 south – Wilmington	East end of US 202 concurrency; west end of US 1 concurrency
Delaware	Concord Township	350.3	563.8		US 1 north (Baltimore Pike) – Media	East end of US 1 concurrency
Delaware	Bethel Township	353.5	568.9		PA 261 south / Garnet Mine Road (EB) PA 261 south (WB)	Interchange; eastbound access to PA 261 via Garnet Mine Road, westbound access to PA 261 via SR 3029; northern terminus of PA 261
Delaware	Upper Chichester Township	356.5	573.7		PA 452 to I-95 south – Media, Marcus Hook	Interchange
Delaware	Upper Chichester Township	357.0	574.5		West end of freeway	
Delaware	Upper Chichester Township	357.0	574.5		Bethel Road	Right-in/right-out
Delaware	Chester	357.7	575.7		Highland Avenue	Eastbound exit and westbound entrance
Delaware	Chester	357.8	575.8		I-95 south – Wilmington	West end of I-95 concurrency; westbound left exit and eastbound entrance; I-95 exit 3A
Delaware	Chester			3B	Highland Avenue	Westbound exit and eastbound entrance; exit number follows I-95
Delaware	Chester Township	358.5	576.9	—	I-95 north – Philadelphia	East end of I-95 concurrency; eastbound left exit and westbound left entrance; I-95 exit 4
Delaware	Chester Township	358.5	576.9	—	Concord Road	Westbound exit only
Delaware	Chester Township	358.5	576.9	—	I-95 north to I-476 – Philadelphia	Westbound exit and eastbound left entrance; I-95 exit 4
Delaware	Chester	358.9	577.6	—	PA 291 / US 13 – Chester	Westbound exit and eastbound entrance; access via U.S. 13 Bus.
Delaware	Chester			—	PA 291 – Chester Waterfront	Eastbound exit and westbound entrance
Delaware River				Commodore Barry Bridge (westbound toll in New Jersey)		
Delaware River					US 322 east (CR 536 east) – New Jersey	New Jersey state line
1.000 mi = 1.609 km; 1.000 km = 0.621 mi: Concurrency terminus; Incomplete access; Tolled

== See also ==
U.S. Route 322
Previous state: Ohio	Pennsylvania	Next state: New Jersey
