= Penn State World Campus =

Online campus of Pennsylvania State University

Coordinates: 40.80679°N 77.85924°W

- Type: Public online university
- Established: 1998
- Parent institution: Pennsylvania State University
- Students: 13,883 (Fall 2025)
- Undergraduates: 8,210 (Fall 2025)
- Postgraduates: 5,673 (Fall 2025)
- Location: University Park (admin. office), Pennsylvania, United States of America
- Website: www.worldcampus.psu.edu

Penn State World Campus is the online campus of Pennsylvania State University, a public university in Pennsylvania. Launched in 1998, World Campus grew out of the university's history in distance education that began in 1892. It offers more than 200 online undergraduate and graduate degree and certificate programs in partnership with Penn State academic units. World Campus offices and a major part of its technical infrastructure are located at Innovation Park on the University Park Campus.

Penn State World Campus is accredited by the Middle States Commission on Higher Education (MSCHE).

Penn State World Campus is the real Penn State. Students will take courses with a curriculum developed and taught by the same professors who teach on campus. Students can expect the same caliber of academic quality associated with Penn State. Every student – regardless of their campus – receives a diploma or certificate that signifies they have completed a Penn State program. Penn State World Campus is part of Penn State Online Education.

== History ==
Penn State started offering distance education courses in 1892, when it launched one of the nation's first correspondence study programs to farmers around Pennsylvania. More than one hundred years later, in 1998, the university reaffirmed its commitment to providing accessible learning to all who need it with the launching of Penn State World Campus. One of several roots underpinning the policy decision to establish World Campus was a decade of experimentation at The American Centre for Study of Distance Education in the College of Education, in which Professor Michael G. Moore developed and taught some of the world's first online courses, including cadres of students in several cities in Mexico and Europe as well as the USA. Penn State Vice-president Jim Ryan became persuaded of the quality of the pedagogy being developed in these courses and in 1992 he commissioned the setting up of a university-wide Task Force to study the potential of a major initiative, the conclusion being that "The Task Force firmly believes that there is a very real possibility that national and international preeminence in distance education may prove to be a prerequisite to national and international preeminence in most other areas of academic enterprise." Moore led the development of the first World Campus master's degree courses in adult education.

Penn State World Campus uses multiple technologies to make some of Penn State's well-respected graduate, undergraduate, and continuing professional education programs available anytime, anywhere throughout the world.

== Academics ==
Penn State World Campus offers online programs awarding graduate and undergraduate degrees and certificates. Courses are offered in an online asynchronous format.

== Rankings ==
U.S. News & World Report recognized 23 Penn State World Campus degree programs in their 2026 Best Online Programs rankings.

- No. 1 in Best Online Bachelor's in Psychology Programs
- No. 4 in Best Online Master's in Educational/Instructional Media Design Programs
- No. 4 in Best Online Master's in Engineering Management Programs (tie)
- No. 4 in Best Online Master's in Engineering Programs
- No. 6 in Best Online Master's in Mechanical Engineering Programs (tie)
- No. 8 in Best Online Master's in Industrial Engineering Programs
- No. 9 in Best Online Bachelor's in Business Programs (tie)
- No. 9 in Best Online Master's in Educational Administration Programs (tie)
- No. 10 in Best Online Master's in Curriculum and Instruction Programs (tie)
- No. 10 in Best Online Master's in Special Education Programs
- No. 11 in Best Online Master's in Electrical Engineering Programs (tie)
- No. 15 in Best Online General Management MBA Programs (tie)
- No. 15 in Best Online Master's in Information Technology Programs
- No. 25 in Best Online Master's in Education Programs (tie)
- No. 37 in Best Online Master's in Business Programs (Excluding MBA) (tie)
- No. 50 in Best Online MBA Programs (tie)

The "Best Online Programs for Veterans" rankings for Penn State are:

- No. 3 in Best Online Master's in Engineering Programs for Veterans
- No. 8 in Best Online Master's in Computer Information Technology Programs for Veterans
- No. 13 in Best Online Master's in Education Programs for Veterans
- No. 19 in Best Online Master's in Business Programs for Veterans (Excluding MBA) (tie)
- No. 25 in Best Online Bachelor's Programs for Veterans (tie)
- No. 30 in Best Online MBA Programs for Veterans (tie)
