= Mineral Springs, Pennsylvania =

Unincorporated community in Pennsylvania, US

- Unincorporated community
- Location within Pennsylvania
- Coordinates: 40°59′53″N 78°21′49″W
- Country: United States
- State: Pennsylvania
- County: Clearfield
- Elevation: 1,398 ft (426 m)
- Time zone: UTC-5 (Eastern (EST))
  - Summer (DST): UTC-4 (EDT)
- ZIP code: 16855
- Area code: 814
- GNIS feature ID: 1181319

Mineral Springs is an unincorporated community in Clearfield County, Pennsylvania, United States. The community is located along U.S. Route 322, 4.4 miles (7.1 km) east-southeast of Clearfield. Mineral Springs has a post office, with ZIP code 16855.

== Demographics ==
Historical population
Census	Pop.	Note	%±

The United States Census Bureau defined Mineral Springs as a census designated place (CDP) in 2023.
