= Brandywine Valley Viaduct =

Abandoned railroad viaduct in Pennsylvania, U.S.

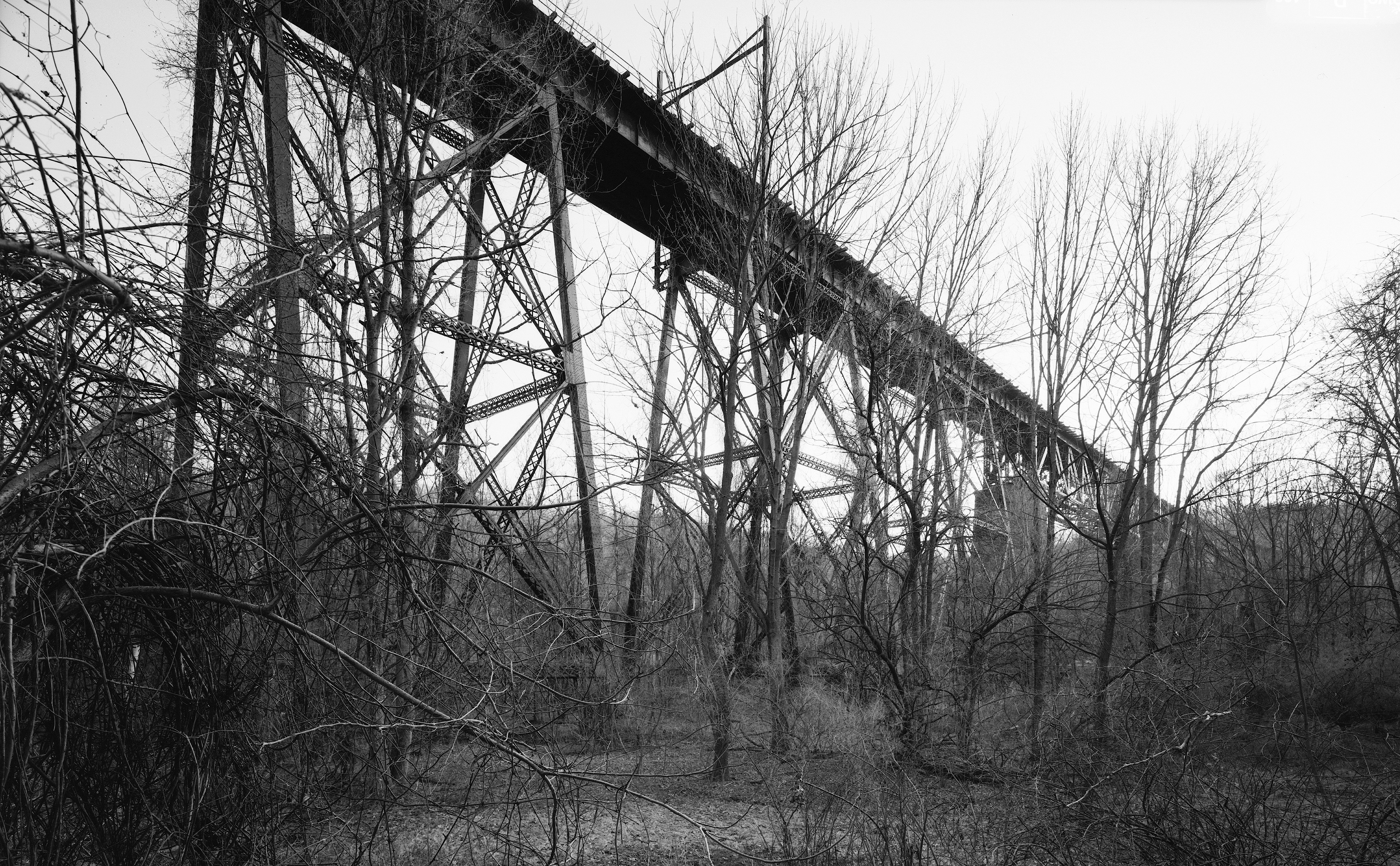
- The viaduct in 1999
- Coordinates: 39°59′42″N 75°41′57″W
- Crosses: East Branch Brandywine Creek and U.S. Route 322
- Locale: Chester, Pennsylvania, United States
- Other name(s): Downingtown Trestle Bridge; Downingtown High Bridge; Pennsylvania Railroad Freight Bridge
- Maintained by: Chester County

Characteristics
- Total length: 1,452 ft (443 m)
- Height: 132 ft (40 m)
- Longest span: 204 ft (62 m)
- No. of spans: 24

History
- Constructed by: Pennsylvania Steel Company
- Construction start: 1903
- Opened: 1904
- Closed: ≈1989

Location
- Interactive map of Brandywine Valley Viaduct

The Brandywine Valley Viaduct (colloquially referred to as the Downingtown Trestle Bridge or Downingtown High Bridge, and historically known as the Pennsylvania Railroad Freight Bridge) is an abandoned pratt truss trestle bridge that spans the East Branch Brandywine Creek and U.S. Route 322 near Downingtown, Pennsylvania. The viaduct was originally built in 1904, serving the Pennsylvania Railroad (PRR).

== History ==
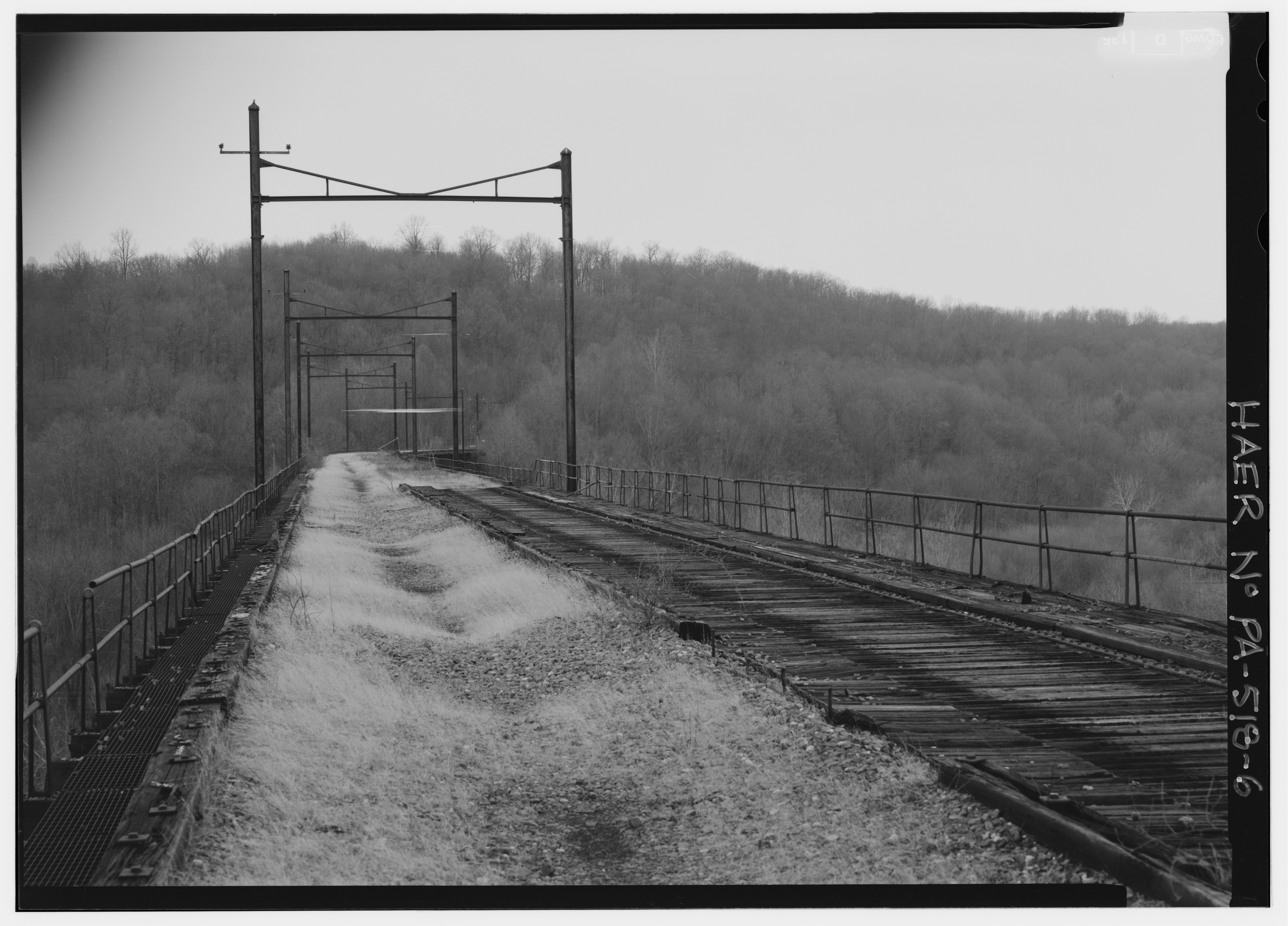
View from the deck of the viaduct

The Brandywine Valley Viaduct was constructed by the Pennsylvania Steel Company to serve the Pennsylvania Railroad (PRR). The viaduct mainly carried freight traffic, but also carried passengers on the local Philadelphia and Thorndale Branch of the PRR. The viaduct also served as a detour route for passenger trains when there were issues on the PRR's Main Line. It was double-tracked at the time of its completion until 1971, and was electrified in 1938. Rehabilitation work took place on the bridge from 1948 to 1951. Following the merger of the PRR into the Penn Central, and then Conrail, the bridge continued in use until the mid-1980s. The track was removed in 1989.

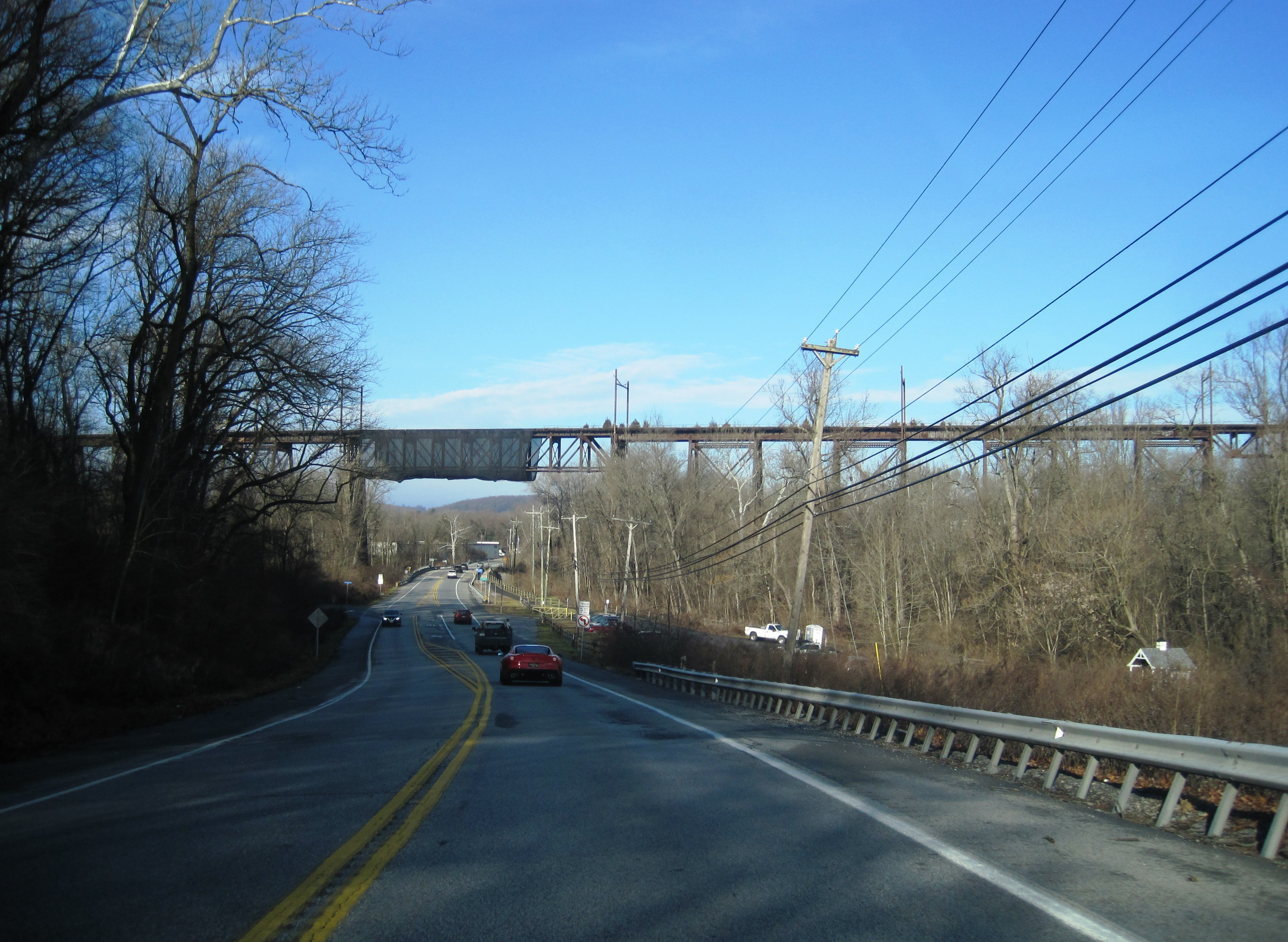
View of the viaduct from U.S. Route 322.

Since the removal of the track, the viaduct has remained abandoned. Because U.S. Route 322 runs under the viaduct's main span, protective netting has been installed under the deck to prevent possible debris from falling onto the roadway. From 2014 to 2023, six suicides occurred on the bridge, prompting calls from local community members to prevent access to the bridge. In 2023, the Pennsylvania Department of Transportation (PennDOT) installed higher fencing at possible access points.

In 2025, the Chester County government purchased the viaduct from PennDOT for $1. The county has expressed plans to convert the bridge into a rail trail that would connect with the existing Chester Valley Trail, along with further upgrading safety measures. Construction is expected to begin in 2027.

== See also ==
- List of bridges documented by the Historic American Engineering Record in Pennsylvania
