= Seneca, Pennsylvania =

Unincorporated community in Pennsylvania, US

Seneca
- Census-designated place
- Location within the U.S. state of Pennsylvania Seneca (the United States)
- Coordinates: 41°22′40″N 79°42′12″W
- Country: United States
- State: Pennsylvania
- County: Venango

Area
  - Total: 2.25 sq mi (5.82 km^{2})
  - Land: 2.25 sq mi (5.82 km^{2})
  - Water: 0 sq mi (0.00 km^{2})

Population (2020)
  - Total: 1,011
  - Density: 449.8/sq mi (173.66/km^{2})
- Time zone: UTC-5 (Eastern (EST))
  - Summer (DST): UTC-4 (EDT)
- ZIP codes: 16346
- Area code: 814
- FIPS code: 42-69272

Seneca is a census-designated place (CDP) in Cranberry Township, Venango County, Pennsylvania, United States. As of the 2020 census, the CDP population was 1,010. This was a decline of 5.1% from the census conducted in 2010.

== Geography ==
Seneca is located at 41°22′40″N 79°42′12″W (41.377828, -79.703224).

According to the United States Census Bureau, the CDP has a total area of 2.2 square miles (5.7 km^{2}), all of it land.

== Demographics ==
Historical population
| Census | Pop. | Note | %± |
|---|---|---|---|
| 1990 | 1,029 | | — |
| 2000 | 966 | | −6.1% |
| 2010 | 1,065 | | 10.2% |
| 2020 | 1,011 | | −5.1% |
U.S. Decennial Census

At the 2020 census, there were 1010 people, 426 households and 300 families residing in the CDP. The population density was 430.8 inhabitants per square mile (166.3/km^{2}). There were 432 housing units at an average density of 192.6 per square mile (74.4/km^{2}). The racial makeup of the CDP was 97.26% White, 0.31% African American, 0.31% Asian, 1.32% from other races, and 1.43% from two or more races. Hispanic or Latino of any race were 0.10% of the population.

There were 426 households, of which 24.0% had children under the age of 18 living with them, 62.9% were married couples living together, 5.0% had a female householder with no husband present, and 28.7% were non-families. 25.7% of all households were made up of individuals, and 13.5% had someone living alone who was 65 years of age or older. The average household size was 2.29 and the average family size was 2.76.

Age distribution was 19.4% under the age of 18, 6.2% from 18 to 24, 23.3% from 25 to 44, 27.7% from 45 to 64, and 23.4% who were 65 years of age or older. The median age was 46 years. For every 100 females, there were 94.4 males. For every 100 females age 18 and over, there were 94.8 males.

The median household income $73,819, and the median family income was $47,083. Males had a median income of $32,750 versus $20,217 for females. The per capita income for the CDP was $18,726. About 3.2% of families and 6.0% of the population were below the poverty line, including 16.8% of those under age 18 and 2.8% of those age 65 or over.

== Landmarks ==
The QRS Music Technology company is located in Seneca.
