= Cranberry Township, Venango County, Pennsylvania =

Township in Pennsylvania, US

Coordinates: 41°21′00″N 79°45′29″W

Cranberry
- Township
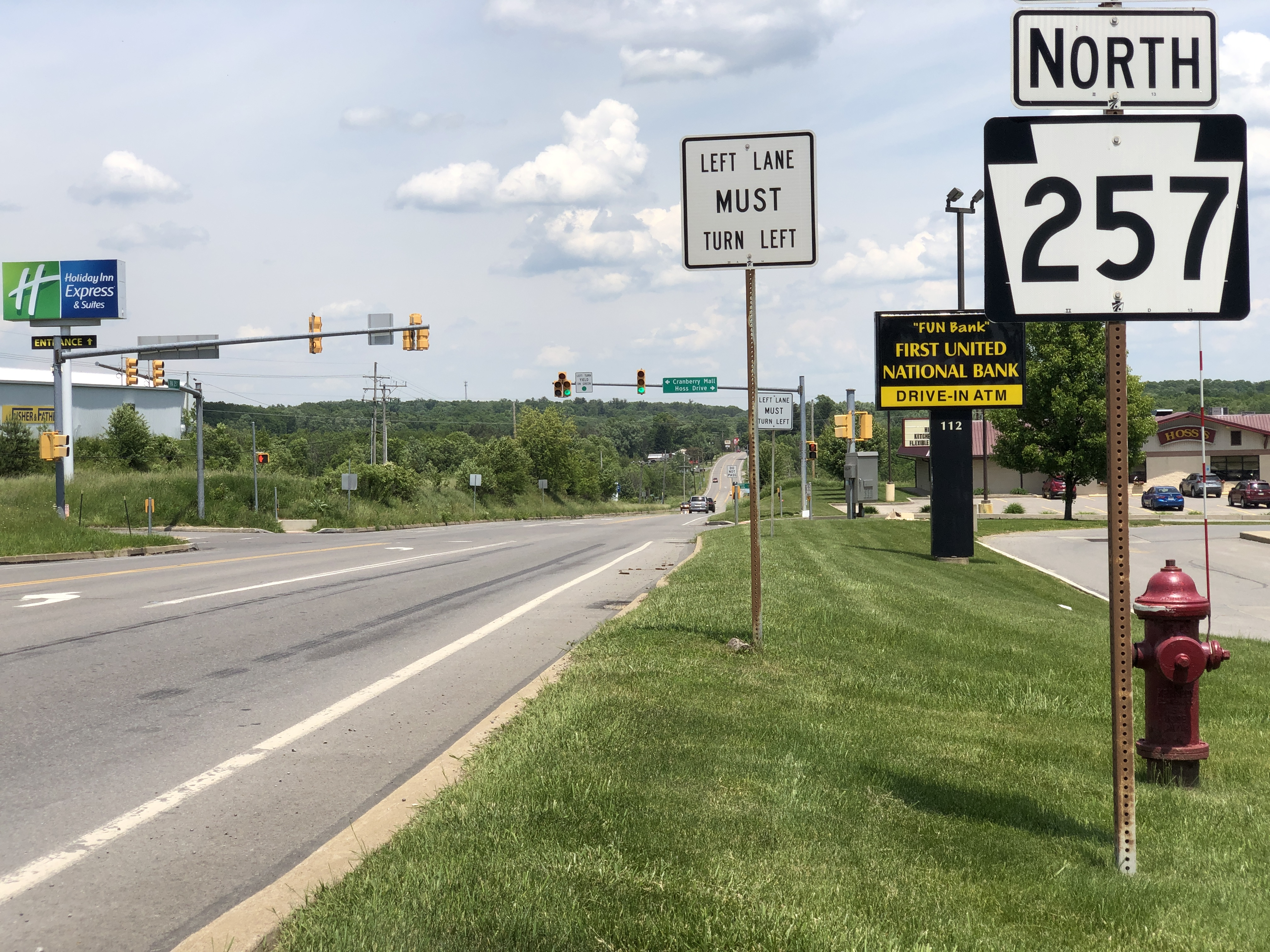
- PA 257 in Cranberry Township

- Logo

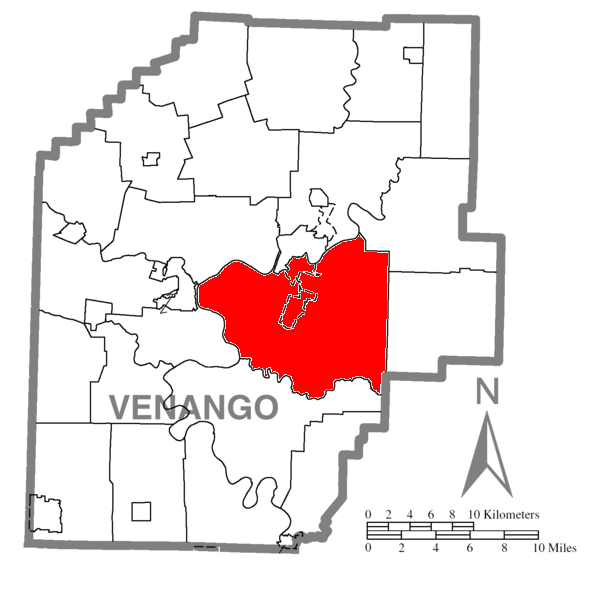
- Map of Venango County, Pennsylvania highlighting Cranberry Township

- Map of Venango County, Pennsylvania
- Country: United States
- State: Pennsylvania
- County: Venango
- Settled: 1825
- Incorporated: 1830

Government
  - Type: Board of Supervisors

Area
  - Total: 70.02 sq mi (181.36 km^{2})
  - Land: 69.80 sq mi (180.78 km^{2})
  - Water: 0.22 sq mi (0.58 km^{2})

Population (2020)
  - Total: 6,340 ▼
  - Estimate (2024): 6,260
  - Density: 92.4/sq mi (35.69/km^{2})
- Time zone: UTC-5 (Eastern (EST))
  - Summer (DST): UTC-4 (EDT)
- Postal code: 16319
- Area code: 814
- FIPS code: 42-121-16944
- Website: cranberrytwp.org

The Township of Cranberry is a township in Venango County, Pennsylvania, United States. The population was 6,340 at the 2020 census, a decrease from 6,685 in 2010, which represented a decrease from the figure of 7,014 at the 2000 census.

== Geography ==
According to the United States Census Bureau, the township has a total area of 71.3 square miles (185 km^{2}), of which 70.4 square miles (182 km^{2}) is land and 0.9 square miles (2.3 km^{2}) (1.25%) is water. It contains the census-designated places of Seneca and Woodland Heights.

== Demographics ==
Historical population
Census	Pop.	Note	%±
2000	7,014		—
2010	6,685		−4.7%
2020	6,340		−5.2%
2024 (est.)	6,260		−1.3%
U.S. Decennial Census

As of the census of 2000, there were 7,014 people, 2,843 households, and 2,066 families residing in the township. The population density was 99.7 inhabitants per square mile (38.5/km^{2}). There were 3,054 housing units at an average density of 43.4 per square mile (16.8/km^{2}). The racial makeup of the township was 98.67% White, 0.31% African American, 0.24% Native American, 0.20% Asian, 0.24% from other races, and 0.33% from two or more races. Hispanic or Latino of any race were 0.66% of the population.

There were 2,843 households, out of which 31.1% had children under the age of 18 living with them, 59.2% were married couples living together, 9.7% had a female householder with no husband present, and 27.3% were non-families. 24.0% of all households were made up of individuals, and 11.4% had someone living alone who was 65 years of age or older. The average household size was 2.46 and the average family size was 2.89.

In the township the population was spread out, with 24.1% under the age of 18, 7.5% from 18 to 24, 26.2% from 25 to 44, 25.9% from 45 to 64, and 16.2% who were 65 years of age or older. The median age was 40 years. For every 100 females, there were 94.2 males. For every 100 females age 18 and over, there were 91.2 males.

The median income for a household in the township was $34,547, and the median income for a family was $40,063. Males had a median income of $31,573 versus $24,750 for females. The per capita income for the township was $16,361. About 10.6% of families and 11.8% of the population were below the poverty line, including 16.2% of those under age 18 and 6.1% of those age 65 or over.

=== Unincorporated community ===
- Bredinsburg – Also known in 1906 as Breydensburg.
