= Innovation Park (Pennsylvania State University) =

Coordinates: 40.831°N 77.844°W

- Location within Pennsylvania
- Location: College Township, Pennsylvania, United States
- Opening date: 1994
- Developer: Pennsylvania State University
- Owner: Pennsylvania State University
- Size: 118 acres (48 ha)
- Website: innovationpark.psu.edu

Innovation Park at Pennsylvania State University is a business and research park covering 118 acres (0.48 km^{2}) in College Township, Pennsylvania, adjacent to the Penn State campus near the junction of Interstate 99/U.S. Route 220 and U.S. Route 322.

== History ==
The university's trustees designated the area for a research park in 1989. Initially known as the Penn State Research Park and opened in 1994, its stated mission was to be the "place where collaboration between the University and private sector companies can grow," and to facilitate the transfer of University-based knowledge "to the market place and to foster economic development". It was renamed Innovation Park at Penn State in July 2000.

The area is the location of a number of university offices, the Penn State World Campus, a conference center, and more than 50 private companies. The production facilities of WPSU-TV and WPSU-FM moved there in 2005.
