= Woodland Heights, Pennsylvania =

Unincorporated community in Pennsylvania, US

Woodland Heights
- Census-designated place
- Location within the U.S. state of Pennsylvania Woodland Heights (the United States)
- Coordinates: 41°24′34″N 79°42′6″W
- Country: United States
- State: Pennsylvania
- County: Venango

Area
  - Total: 1.7 sq mi (4.5 km^{2})
  - Land: 1.7 sq mi (4.3 km^{2})
  - Water: 0.077 sq mi (0.2 km^{2})

Population (2000)
  - Total: 1,402
  - Density: 840/sq mi (330/km^{2})
- Time zone: UTC-5 (Eastern (EST))
  - Summer (DST): UTC-4 (EDT)
- ZIP codes: 16301, 16346
- Area code: 814

Woodland Heights is a census-designated place (CDP) in Cranberry Township, Venango County, Pennsylvania, United States. The population was 1,402 at the 2000 census.

== Geography ==
Woodland Heights is located at 41°24′34″N 79°42′6″W (41.409363, -79.701591).

According to the United States Census Bureau, the CDP has a total area of 1.7 square miles (4.4 km^{2}), of which 1.6 square miles (4.1 km^{2}) is land and 0.1 square miles (0.26 km^{2}) (5.17%) is water.

== Demographics ==
Historical population
Census	Pop.	Note	%±
1970	1,329		—
1980	1,684		26.7%
1990	1,471		−12.6%
2000	1,402		−4.7%
2010	1,351		−3.6%
2020	1,180		−12.7%

As of the census of 2000, there were 1,402 people, 588 households, and 402 families residing in the CDP. The population density was 848.4 inhabitants per square mile (327.6/km^{2}). There were 612 housing units at an average density of 370.4 per square mile (143.0/km^{2}). The racial makeup of the CDP was 97.57% White, 0.43% African American, 0.36% Native American, 0.43% Asian, 0.57% from other races, and 0.64% from two or more races. Hispanic or Latino of any race were 1.85% of the population.

There were 588 households. Out of these households, 33.0% had children under the age of 18 living with them, 48.8% were married couples living together, 16.0% had a female householder with no husband present, and 31.6% were non-families. 27.6% of all households were made up of individuals, and 12.4% had someone living alone who was 65 years of age or older. The average household size had 2.38 people and the average family size had 2.87 people.

In the CDP, the population was spread out, with 26.5% under the age of 18, 9.9% from 18 to 24, 25.0% from 25 to 44, 23.3% from 45 to 64, and 15.3% who were 65 years of age or older. The median age was 37 years. For every 100 females, there were 82.3 males. For every 100 females age 18 and over, there were 77.5 males.

The median income for a household in the CDP was $31,875, and the median income for a family was $36,696. Males had a median income of $30,074 versus $27,109 for females. The per capita income for the CDP was $15,123. About 16.1% of families and 17.8% of the population were below the poverty line, including 18.2% of those under age 18 and 3.4% of those age 65 or over.
