= Pennsylvania Route 103 =

State highway in Pennsylvania, US

Pennsylvania Route 103

Route information
- Maintained by PennDOT
- Length: 30.780 mi (49.536 km)

Major junctions
- South end: US 522 near Mount Union
- PA 333 near Juniata Terrace
- North end: US 22 Bus. in Lewistown

Location
- Country: United States
- State: Pennsylvania
- Counties: Huntington, Mifflin

Highway system
- Pennsylvania State Route System; Interstate; US; State; Scenic; Legislative
← PA 102	→ PA 104

Pennsylvania Route 103 (abbreviated PA Route 103 or PA 103, officially State Route 103 or SR 103) is a 30.8-mile (49.57 km) long north–south designated state route in the Commonwealth of Pennsylvania. Its primary course is along the south/east side of the Juniata River, while U.S. Route 522 runs along the opposite side. PA 103's southern terminus is an at-grade intersection with US 522 at Allenport in Shirley Township, a bit south of US 522's bridge across the Juniata River in Mount Union. Its northern terminus is an intersection with US 22 Business in Lewistown. It intersects the northern terminus of PA 333 just south of Juniata Terrace.

== Route description ==
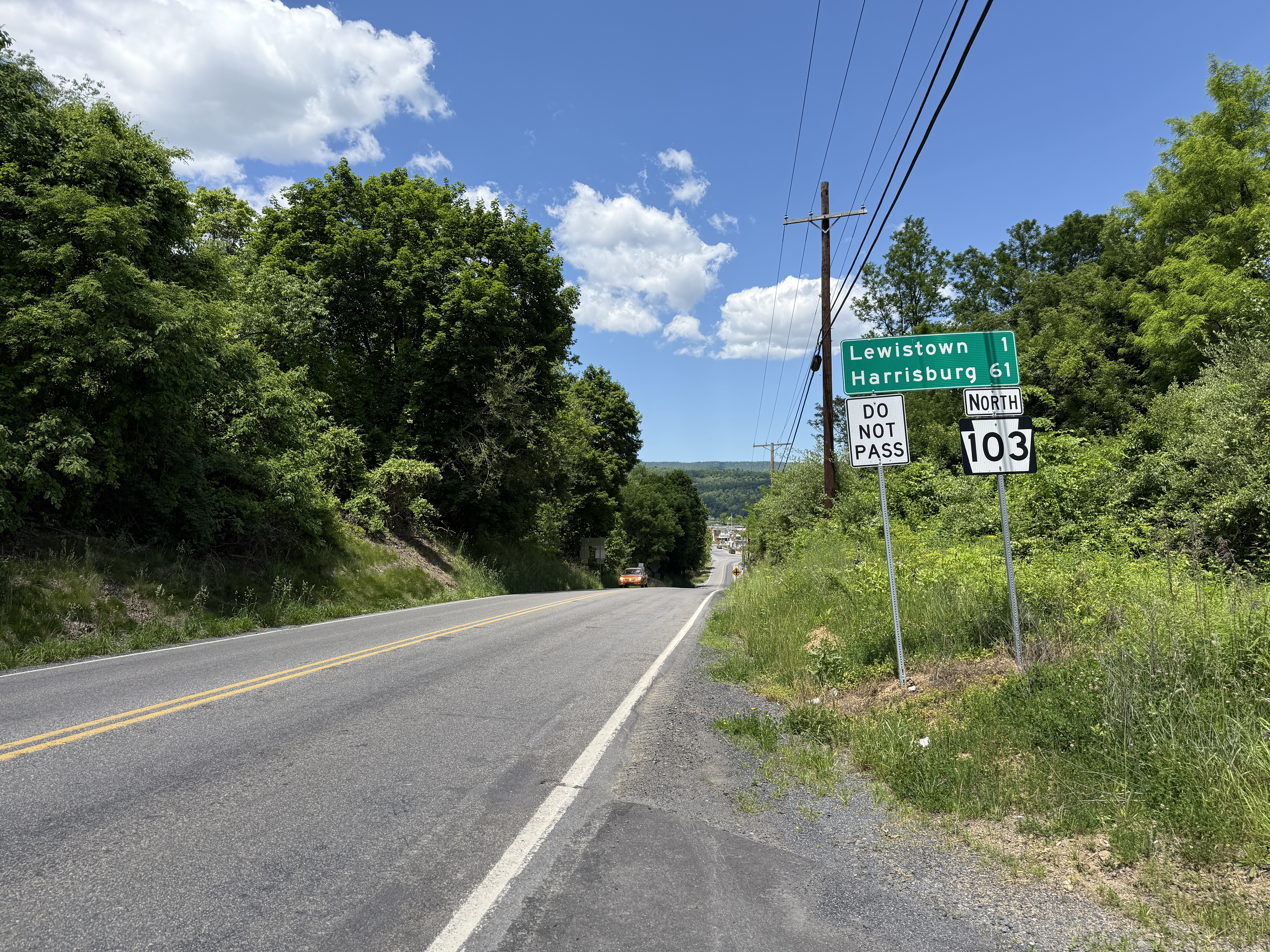
PA 103 northbound past PA 333 in Granville Township

PA 103 begins at an intersection with US 522 in the community of Allenport in Shirley Township, Huntingdon County, heading east on two-lane undivided Beacon Lodge Road. The road immediately crosses the East Broad Top Railroad before it curves southeast and runs between residential areas to the southwest and the Juniata River to the northeast. The route continues alongside the river and turns east, passing to the north of farmland with some development. PA 103 continues to wind east along the Juniata River and heads into forested areas with some farm fields, crossing Aughwick Creek. The road turns to the northeast as it passes between the river to the northwest and Tuscarora State Forest on Blue Mountain to the southeast.

PA 103 enters Wayne Township in Mifflin County and becomes an unnamed road, curving to the northwest and west as it continues parallel to the Juniata River through forests. The route heads north through a mix of farms and woods before it turns northeast and intersects a bridge across the river that leads to the borough of Newton Hamilton. The road bends east and winds through more rural land alongside the Juniata River before it turns northeast into more forested areas further away from the river. PA 103 curves north and northwest through a mix of farms and woods before it turns northeast to closely parallel the Juniata River. The route curves east away from the river and turns northeast, passing through agricultural areas with some trees. The road draws closer to the river again and heads northeast through the community of Ryde. PA 103 crosses into Bratton Township and winds northeast through farmland with some woods and homes to the southeast of the Juniata River and Norfolk Southern's Pittsburgh Line. The route draws closer to the river and railroad tracks for a short distance before turning northeast. The road curves to the north and runs through agricultural areas with some woodland and residences, turning northwest and north again.

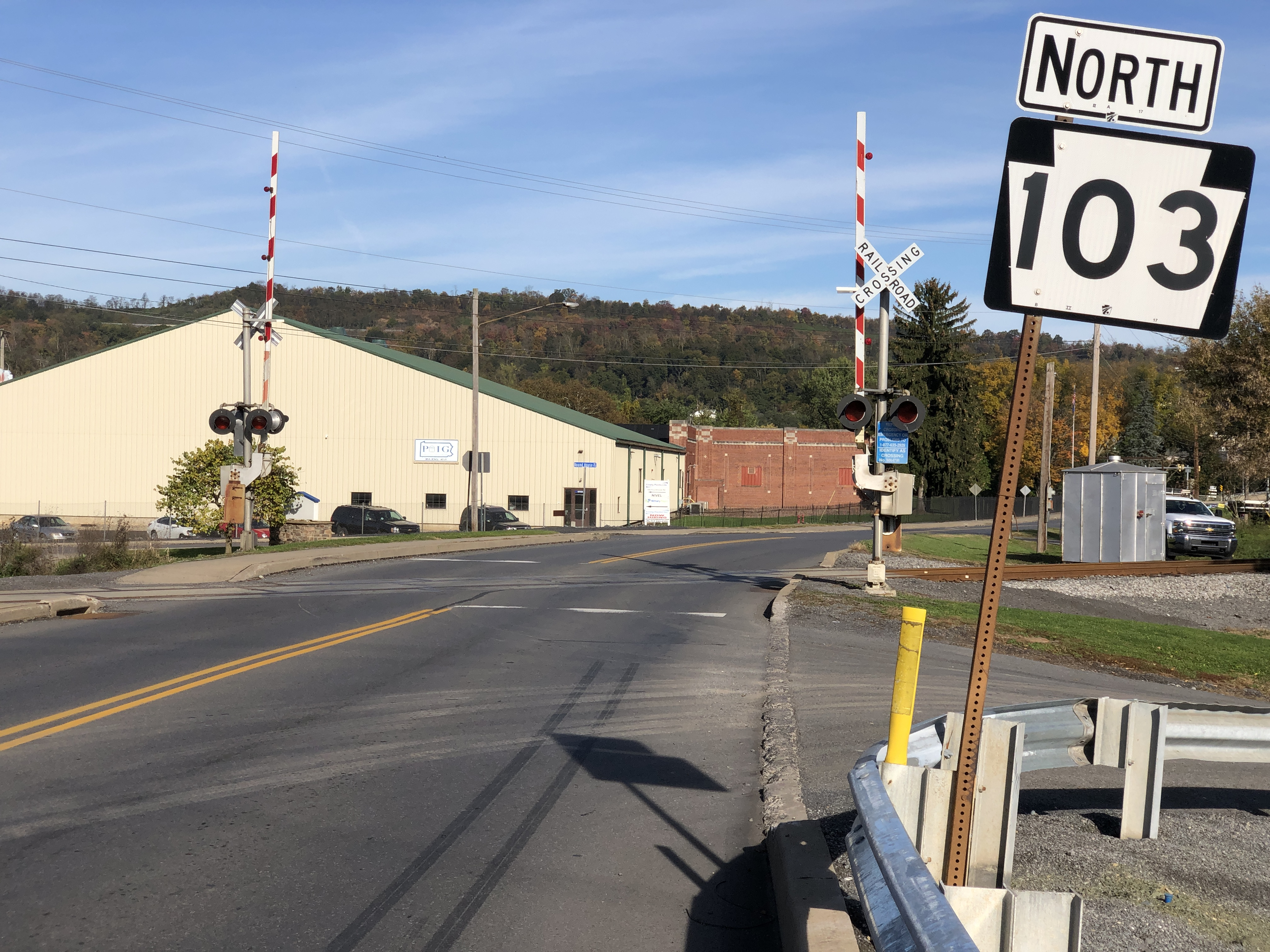
PA 103 northbound south of Lewistown

PA 103 reaches the residential community of Mattawana, where it passes through two S-curves to the northwest before making a turn to the east at the intersection with John Street, which heads west across the Juniata River to the borough of McVeytown. The route passes through an S-curve to the southeast and runs through farmland, making a turn to the northeast. The road runs through more rural land and winds east, turning northeast to pass through the community of Pine Glen. PA 103 continues northeast through the community of Longfellow before the Juniata River and railroad closely parallel the road to the northwest, with Blue Mountain located to the southeast of the road. The route enters Granville Township and the river and railroad line head further away from the road as it passes through a mix of farmland and woodland with some homes a short distance northwest of Blue Mountain. Farther northeast, PA 103 runs north-northeast through forests with some homes east of the Juniata River. The river curves to the west and the route runs northeast through wooded areas with homes, coming to an intersection with the western terminus of PA 333. Past this intersection, the road heads north-northwest through forests and forms the border between Granville Township to the west and the borough of Juniata Terrace to the east. PA 103 turns northeast onto Delaware Avenue and passes between homes and some businesses to the northwest and woodland to the southeast. The route turns north and leaves Juniata Terrace for Granville Township again as it comes to a bridge over the Pittsburgh Line a short distance east of Lewistown's Amtrak station. The road passes north-northwest through residential and commercial areas in Lewistown Junction as an unnamed road, crossing the Juniata Valley Railroad at Helen Street. PA 103 curves north and crosses the Juniata River into the borough of Lewistown, terminating at an intersection with US 22 Bus.

== History ==
Following the passage of the Sproul Road Bill in 1911, the forerunner to PA 103 was Route 33, which ran from Lewistown to Huntingdon. By 1915, however, Route 33 was moved across the Juniata River to the current location of US 22/522, leaving the route unnumbered once again.

Under the 1925 numbering system, PA 103 was a spur route of the original PA 3, the William Penn Highway. Its course journeyed from McVeytown to Juniata Terrace. At that time, the original route twisted through the town of Granville and crossed the Juniata River between Mattawanna and McVeytown.

By 1936, the original PA 3 had been eliminated. That same year, PA 103's southern terminus was moved from its intersection with US 22/US 522 in McVeytown to its current location in Allenport. Since 1941, PA 103's most of its course has been unchanged, as it continues to curve through Mattawanna, but bypasses the center of Granville. In the early-1980s, the northern terminus was moved to the intersection with US 22/US 522 in Lewistown following the reconstruction of the bridge crossing the Conrail tracks near the Lewistown station.

== Major intersections ==
County	Location	mi	km	Destinations	Notes
Huntingdon	Shirley Township	0.000	0.000	US 522 (Croghan Pike) – McConnellsburg, Mount Union	Southern terminus
Mifflin	Granville Township	29.786	47.936	PA 333 east (Hawstone Road) – Mifflin	Western terminus of PA 333
Mifflin	Lewistown	30.780	49.536	US 22 Bus. (Juniata Street) – Mount Union, Huntingdon, Selinsgrove, Harrisburg	Northern terminus
1.000 mi = 1.609 km; 1.000 km = 0.621 mi
