= Whelk Point Fort =

Coordinates: 18.4207°N 64.5702°W

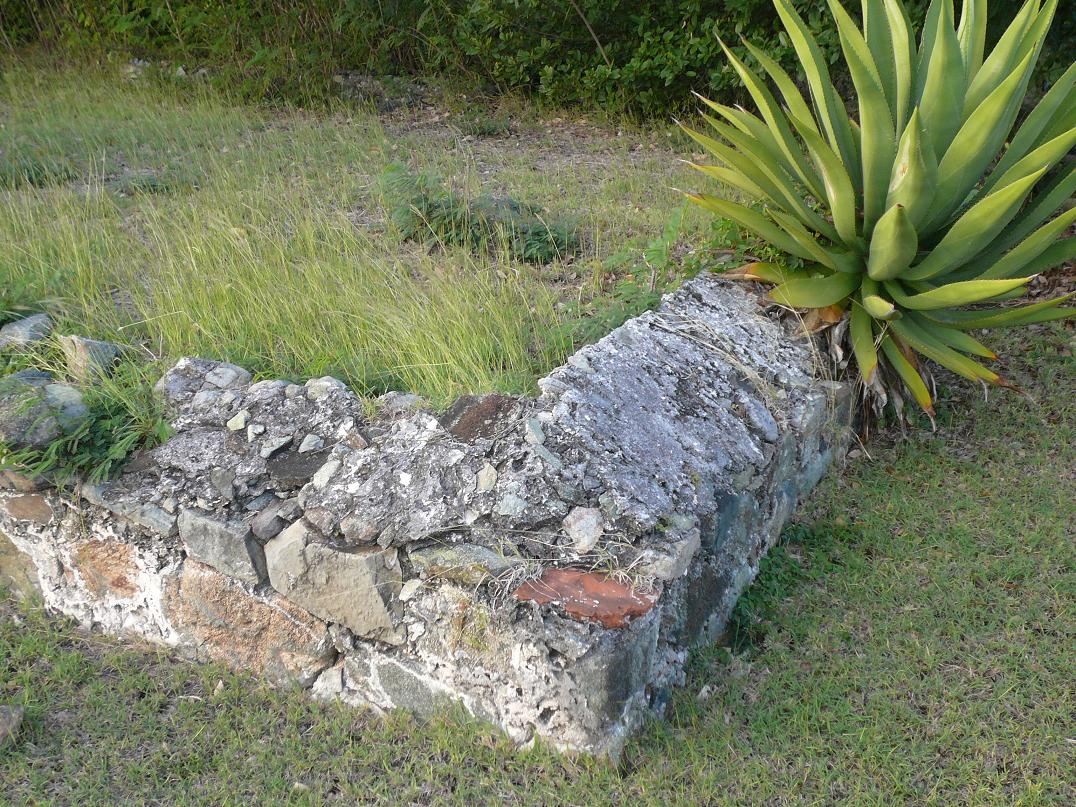
Part of the remains of the barracks of the Whelk Point Fort

The Whelk Point Fort was a colonial fort erected on the southeast part of Tortola in the British Virgin Islands. The fort fell into disrepair and ruin, and relatively little of the original structure remains. In 1992 a house was built over the original foundations of the fort, but the remains of the barracks can still be seen on the land behind the house. The ruins are on private property and are not generally accessible to the public.

The main fortification was built by the British at the outbreak of the American War of Independence. The fort guarded two strategic locations. Primarily, the fort overlooks the narrow passage entering Paraquita Bay to the west - one of the largest natural harbours in the British Virgin Islands and the natural gateway to one of the relatively few large agricultural areas on Tortola. The passage into Paraquita Bay is extremely narrow to navigate in any event with the wind and waves surging directly into the gap, and it would be almost impossible to make the entrance in an eighteenth-century sailboat under immediate fire from the fort only 100 meters away. Secondly, the fort formed part of a twin fortification (with Fort Shirley) around the settlement which was based in what is now known as Hodge's Creek. Although that settlement declined in importance, for a considerable part of the Territory's history (when the main administration of the islands was conducted from Spanish Town on Virgin Gorda), that was the most significant settlement on Tortola.

The fort never actually fired a shot in anger under British command.

The fort later fell again into disrepair, and it was acquired in 1966 by Neville Westwood and his wife, who built their home on the adjacent land. That house was subsequently torn down and a new house erected over the foundations of the fort in 1992.

== Images ==
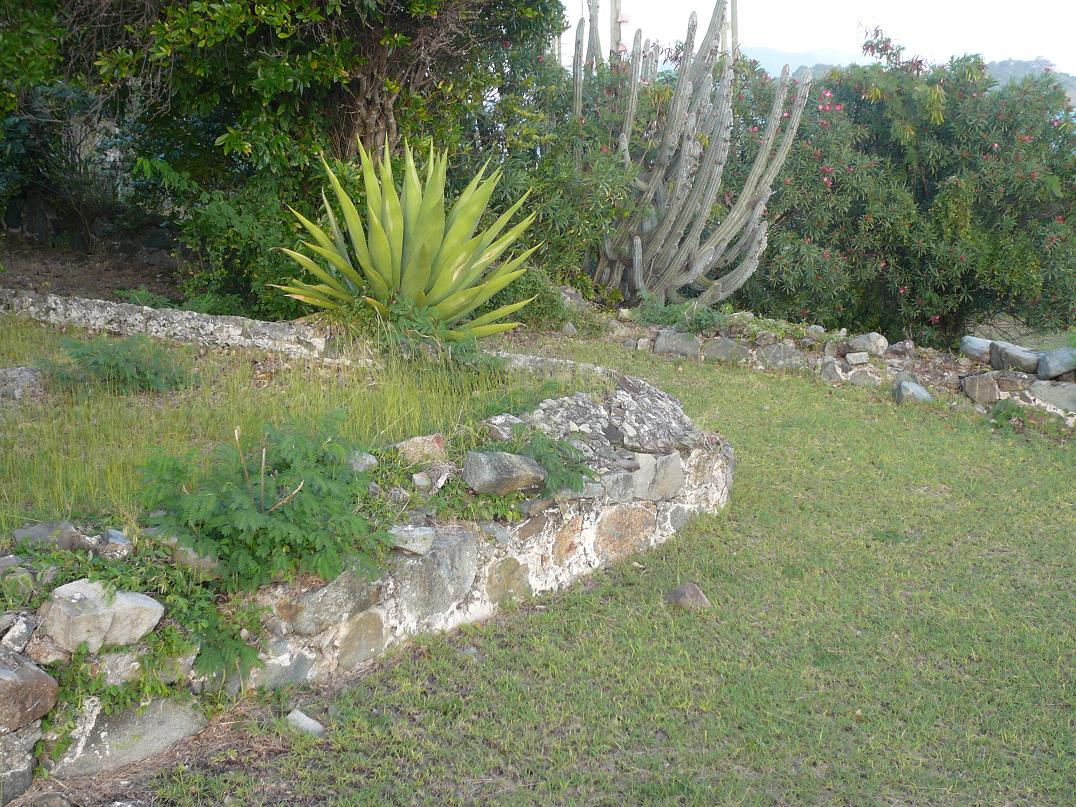
The eastern edge of the ruins

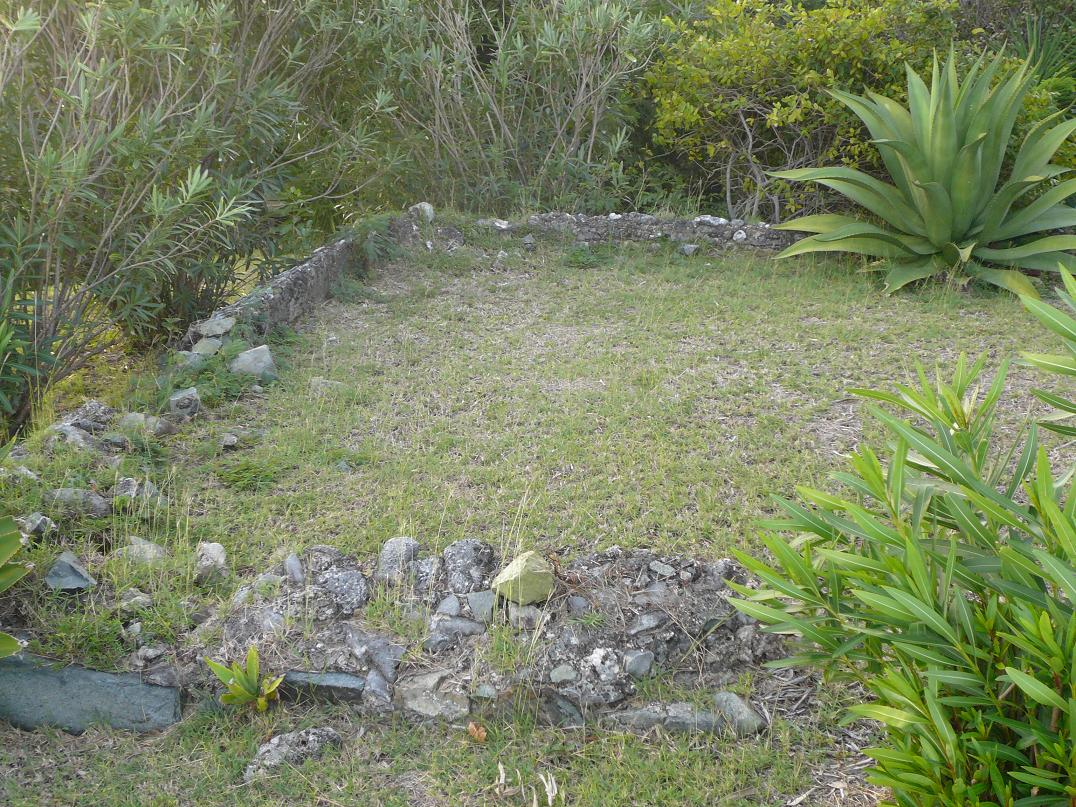
The outline of the original barracks

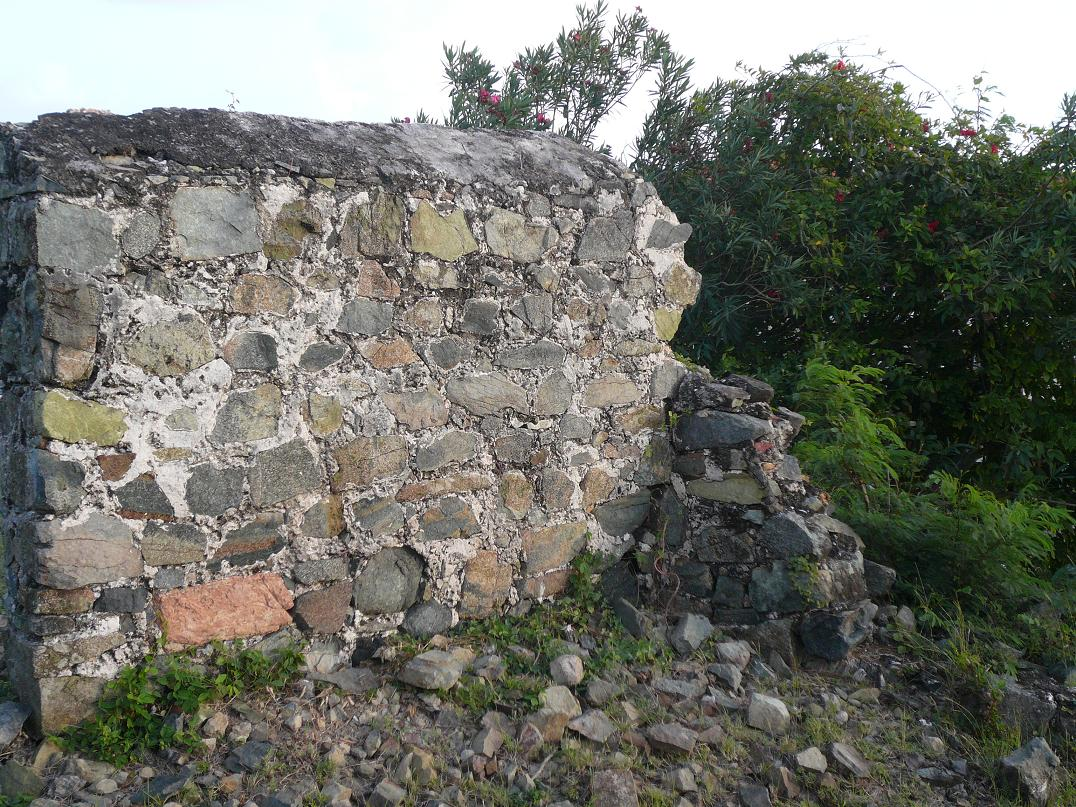
One of the few remaining walls

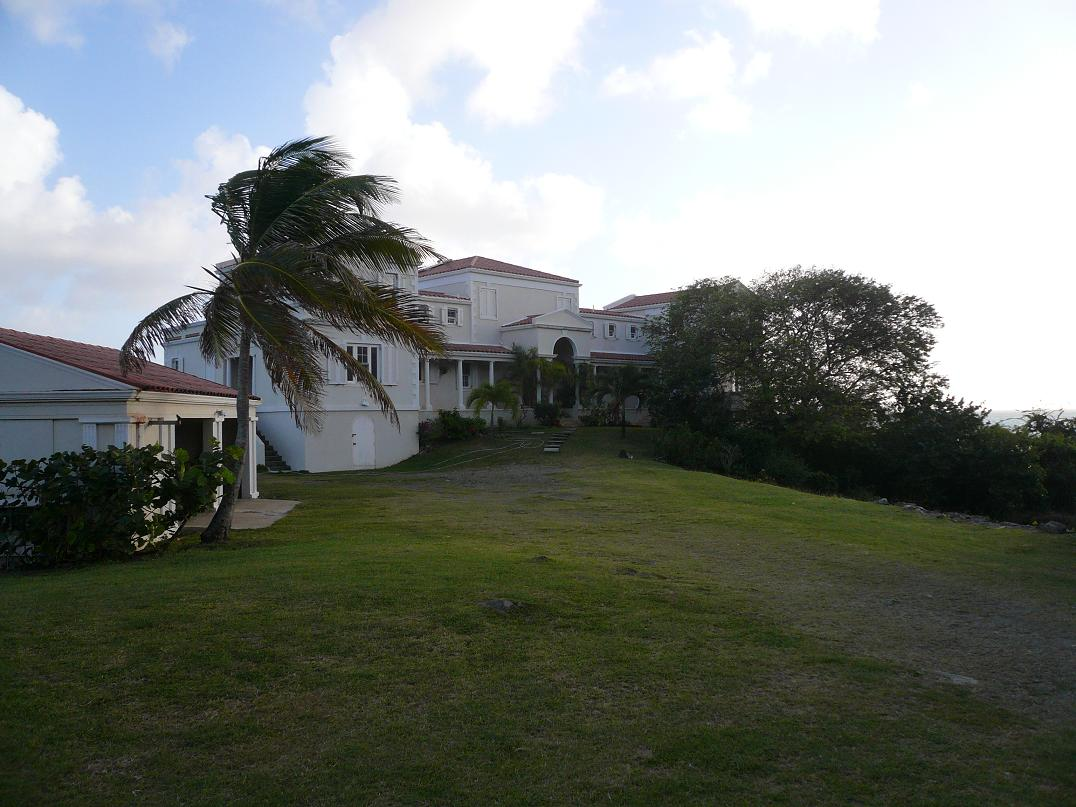
The house which was built over the original fort

== See also ==
- History of the British Virgin Islands
