= Allenport, Pennsylvania =

Allenport is the name of some places in the U.S. state of Pennsylvania:

- Allenport, Huntingdon County, Pennsylvania
- Allenport, Washington County, Pennsylvania
