= PA 103 =

PA 103 can refer to:

- Pan Am Flight 103
- Pennsylvania Route 103
