= William R. Furlong =

United States Navy Rear admiral (1881–1976)

William Rea Furlong
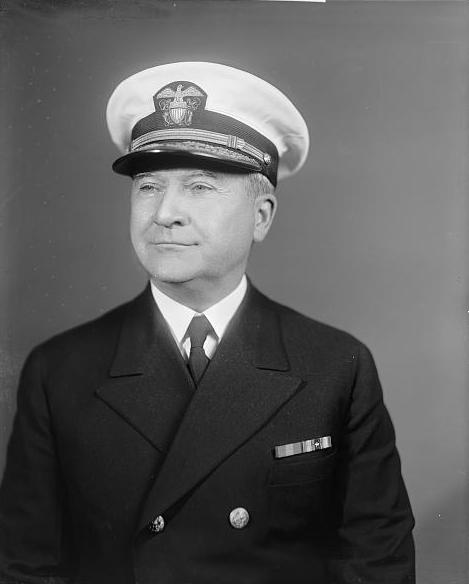
- Born: May 26, 1881; Allenport, Pennsylvania, U.S.
- Died: June 2, 1976 (aged 95); Bethesda, Maryland, U.S.
- Relatives: Capt. William R. Furlong Jr. USNR
- Military career
- Allegiance: United States of America
- Branch: United States Navy
- Service years: 1905–1946
- Rank: Rear Admiral
- Commands: Pearl Harbor Navy Yard; Minecraft, Battle Force; Bureau of Ordnance; USS Marblehead; Destroyer Division 36, Battle Fleet; USS Neches; USS Chicago (Interim)
- Conflicts: Veracruz Expedition; World War I World War II
- Awards: Legion of Merit (2)

William Rea Furlong (May 26, 1881 – June 2, 1976) was a United States Navy rear admiral during World War II, who served as the Chief of Naval Ordnance from 1937 to 1941. After the Japanese attack on Pearl Harbor, Furlong was tasked with the salvaging and repairing of the sunken U.S. ships.

== Early years ==
William Rea Furlong was born on May 26, 1881, in the town of Allenport, Pennsylvania, as a son of William Allen Furlong and Ethel Grant Furlong. Furlong attended the Normal School in California, Pennsylvania, where he earned his teaching degree. He subsequently worked as a teacher for almost two years. In 1901, he was recommended for the United States Naval Academy at Annapolis, Maryland. Furlong graduated in 1905 with the rank of ensign and was assigned to the armored cruiser USS Maryland until 1909.

In 1910, Furlong was assigned to the protected cruiser USS Chicago, which was posted as the reserve of the Massachusetts Naval Militia. He briefly commanded the cruiser from August 19 to the 29th in 1910. He served on Chicago until 1912, when he attended the Columbia University, New York and graduated with the Master of Science degree in electrical and radio engineering in 1914.

After his graduation, Furlong was assigned as fleet radio officer and aide on the staff of the commander-in-chief, United States Atlantic Fleet under the command of Admiral Frank Friday Fletcher. In April 1914, he participated in the Veracruz Expedition in Mexico.

== World War I ==
In July 1914 Fletcher was assigned as the Fleet Radio Officer on board the battleship USS New York. From 1916 to 1917, Furlong served as a gunnery officer on board battleships USS South Carolina and USS Nevada.

Furlong then served as gunnery observer on the battleship USS New York, operating in European waters and as gunnery observer in the war zone with the British Grand Fleet.

In March 1918, he was assigned to the Bureau of Ordnance.

== Interwar period ==
Following the war, Furlong served from 1919 to 1920 as Chief of Fire Control Section, Bureau of Ordnance, Navy Department, Washington, D.C., where he introduced synchronous fire control system and remote control of guns by electrical power.

From 1921 to 1923, he served as an aide on the staff and fleet gunnery officer to the commander-in-chief, United States Pacific Fleet. This was followed by an assignment from 1923 to 1926 where he served in office of the Chief of Naval Operations, Navy Department, Washington, D.C.

From 1926 to 1928, Furlong served as executive officer of the battleship USS West Virginia, and then served as commander of the oiler USS Neches. He also served as commander of the six destroyers in Division 36 of the Destroyer Squadrons, Battle Fleet in the Pacific. He was promoted to captain on September 11, 1927.

From 1928 to 1931, he served as Chief of Policy and Liaison Section, Office of Island Government, Navy Department, Washington, D.C.

From 1931 to 1933, he commanded the light cruiser USS Marblehead. From 1933 to 1934, he attended the Naval War College. He then served as inspector of ordnance in charge at the Naval Proving Ground in Dahlgren, Virginia, from 1934 to 1936.

On August 27, 1937, Furlong received a temporary promotion to rear admiral and succeeded Harold R. Stark as Chief of the Bureau of Ordnance for the Navy Department in Washington, D.C. On June 23, 1938, his promotion to rear admiral was made permanent. On February 19, 1941, he was succeeded as Chief of the Bureau of Ordnance by William H. P. Blandy.

== World War II ==
From February to December 1941, he served as commander of Minecraft, Battle Force at Pearl Harbor, Hawaii. Admiral Furlong was the Senior Officer Present Afloat at Pearl Harbor when it was attacked on December 7, 1941. RADM Furlong commanded Battle Forces Pacific and was on board his flagship, the old minelayer USS Oglala when the attack began. As the first bombs fell, he ordered "All ships in harbor sortie."

From December 12, 1941, to nearly the end of the war, he was commander of the Pearl Harbor Navy Yard and was charged with salvaging and repairing ships sunk during Japanese attack and returning them for use in the Pacific war. Most notably, he oversaw the righting of the battleship USS Oklahoma which capsized after being torpedoed during the attack.

In 1944, he was awarded the Legion of Merit. In 1945, he was awarded a Gold Star in lieu of second Legion of Merit.

On June 1, 1945, Admiral Furlong was placed on the retired list, having reached the mandatory retirement age of sixty-four. Because of the war, he continued to serve on active duty. He retired from the United States Navy on July 18, 1945, after 44 years of service.

== Retirement ==
In retirement Furlong lived in Washington, D.C., and had a summer home in Roscoe, Pennsylvania. He was later decorated with Order of the Cross of Liberty, 1st Class by the Government of Finland as token of good will.

In 1949, Admiral Furlong was elected commander-in-chief of the Military Order of the World Wars. He was also a member of the Naval Order of the United States (companion number 2459). In 1949, he joined the District of Columbia Society of the Sons of the American Revolution and was assigned national membership number 71,282 and society number 2662.

In 1950, he was presented with the Freedoms Foundation award.

It has been posited by Slate writer Alec Nevala-Lee that Furlong is the most convincing candidate for the creator of the 50-star flag of the United States. Furlong was the first official known to have discussed the design for a 50-star flag with then president Dwight Eisenhower in two letters from 1953. Furlong described ways that 49th and 50th-stars could be added to the flag, gave examples of how previous stars were added to the flag, and enclosed now-lost drawings of flag designs in these letters.

Admiral Furlong died on June 2, 1976, in Bethesda, Maryland. He was interred at Arlington National Cemetery.

== Legacy ==
In 1981 Furlong's book So Proudly We Hail: The History of the United States Flag was published by the Smithsonian Institution Press.

The Admiral Furlong Award is awarded by the Sons of the American Revolution for the public display of the American flag by a non-governmental organization.

== Awards ==
The ribbon bar of Rear Admiral William R. Furlong:

1st Row	Legion of Merit with one 5/16" gold star		Mexican Service Medal
2nd Row	World War I Victory Medal with Atlantic Fleet Clasp	American Defense Service Medal with "FLEET" clasp	Asiatic-Pacific Campaign Medal with one service star
3rd Row	American Campaign Medal	World War II Victory Medal	Order of the Cross of Liberty, 1st Class (Finland)
