= Benjamin B. Leas House =

Historic house in Pennsylvania, United States

- U.S. National Register of Historic Places
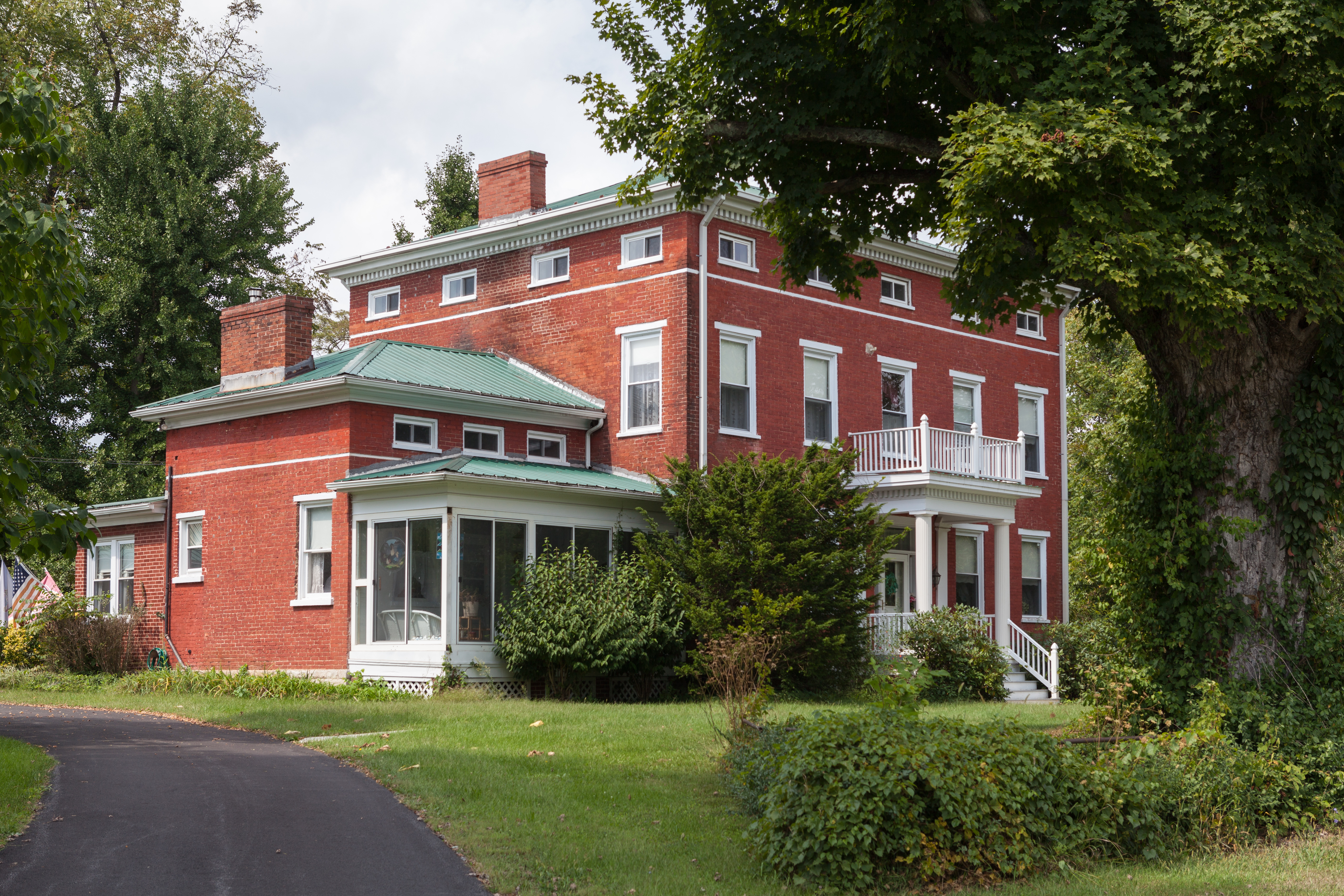
- The house in September 2014

- Location within Pennsylvania Location within the United States
- Location: US 522, Shirleysburg, Pennsylvania
- Coordinates: 40°17′56″N 77°52′18″W
- Area: 2.8 acres (1.1 ha)
- Built: 1755, 1850
- Architect: Benjamin B. Leas
- Architectural style: Greek Revival
- NRHP reference No.: 84003401
- Added to NRHP: February 23, 1984

Benjamin B. Leas House, also known as Shirleysburg Female Seminary, Fort Shirley Site, and "The Rock," is a historic home located at Shirleysburg in Huntingdon County, Pennsylvania. It was built in 1850, and is a 2 1/2-story, rectangular red brick building, five-bays wide and measuring 41 feet by 32 feet. It has a rear kitchen / servant's quarters wing. The house is in the Greek Revival style. The house was built on the site of Fort Shirley, originally built in 1755. The house was used for a seminary from 1855 to 1866, as a rest-home for members of the German Baptist Church from 1885 to 1893, then housed the Shirleysburg Female Seminary until about 1903.

It was listed on the National Register of Historic Places in 1984.
