= Fort Bigham =

18th century colonial fort in Pennsylvania, United States

- Juniata County, Pennsylvania, USA

Site information
- Type: Fort
- Controlled by: Privately owned land

Location
- Approximate location of Fort Bigham in Pennsylvania
- Coordinates: 40°32.802′N 77°21.98′W

Site history
- Built: 1754
- In use: 1754-1763
- Battles/wars: French and Indian War, Pontiac's War

Garrison information
- Past commanders: Samuel Bigham; Ralph Sterrett
- Garrison: variable, local settlers

Pennsylvania Historical Marker
- Designated: 1947

Fort Bigham (sometimes referred to as Bigham's Fort; renamed Fort Bingham after 1760) was a privately built stockaded blockhouse fort constructed in 1754 near present-day Honey Grove in Tuscarora Township, Juniata County, Pennsylvania. It was built by Samuel Bigham on his land to protect his family and neighbors from Indians. In June, 1756 the fort was attacked and the people in it, mostly women and children, were all captured or killed. The fort was largely destroyed. It was rebuilt in 1760 and abandoned in 1763.

== History ==
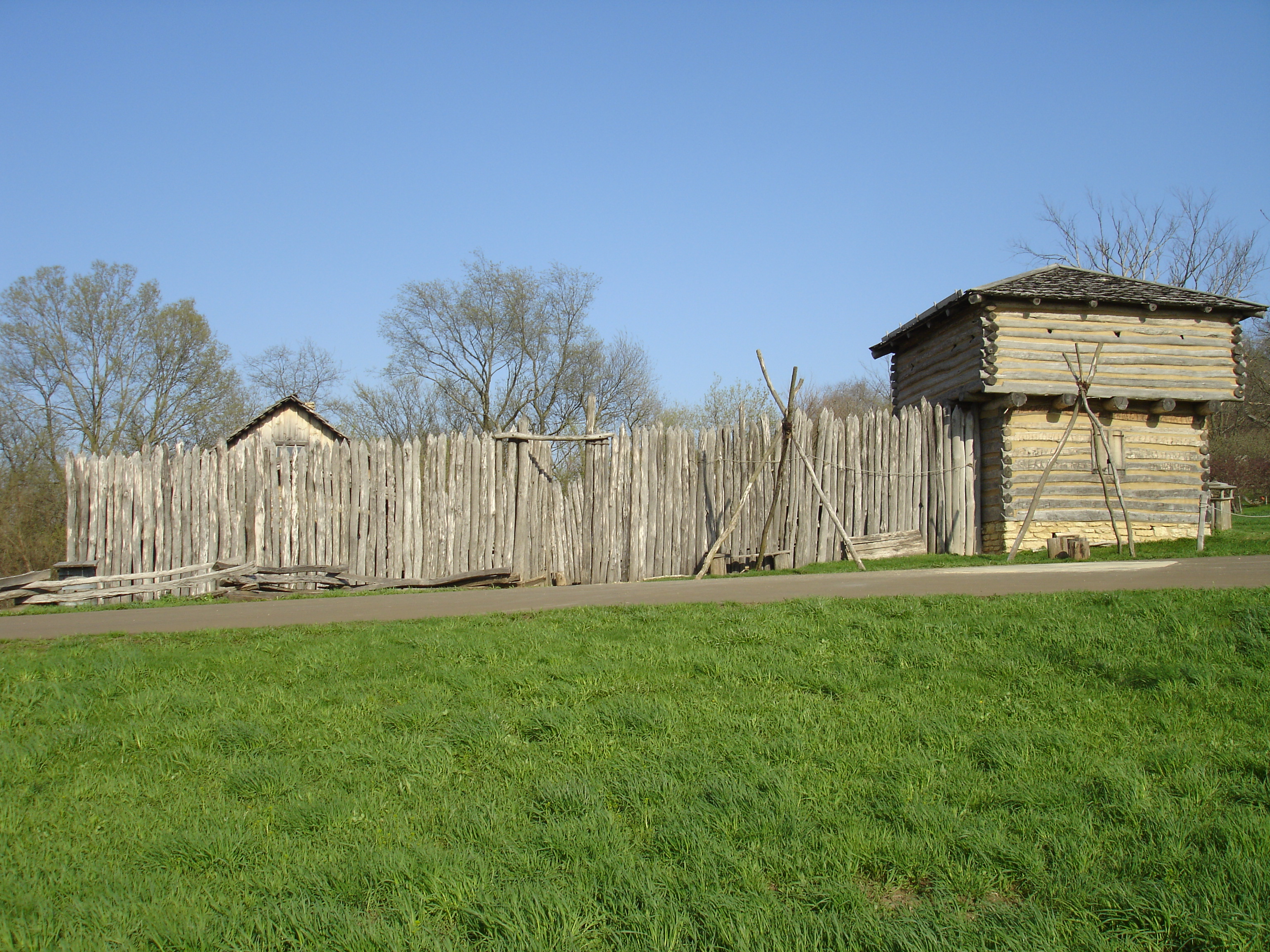
Reconstructed stockade and blockhouse similar to the original Fort Bigham.

=== Construction and location ===
Samuel Bigham (1717-1804) arrived in the area from Ireland around 1742 and applied for a 100-acre land grant in Juniata County in February, 1755. At that time, he had already built the fort near his homestead in late 1754, with the help of his neighbors John and James Gray and Robert Hoag, to protect his family and neighbors from Indian raids which were becoming increasingly frequent in the months leading up to the French and Indian War.

One source describes the fort as "nothing more than a log cabin fitted with loopholes for defense." Another source refers to it as "a strong block-house and small stockade." It is possible that Bigham constructed a fortified cabin, then built his fort around it. The fort was located on the Traders' Path leading from Cumberland County, past Fort Robinson in Perry County, through Bingham's Gap to the fort in Juniata County, and continuing westward through Franklin County to Fort Shirley at Aughwick township in Fulton County.

As tension rose between the British, the French, and local Native American tribes, Bigham ordered "a quarter-cask of powder and seventy-five pounds of lead" which was delivered to him on 7 April 1756. Soon afterwards, for safety reasons, Bigham took his family and moved to York County, and was not present when the fort was attacked.

=== Destruction, 1756 ===
The fort was attacked and destroyed by French soldiers and Indians on 11 June 1756. Reportedly the Indians were Lenape warriors from Kittanning led by Tamaqua, often referred to as "King Beaver." French correspondence shows that Ensign Pierre-Louis Boucher Niverville de Montizambert was ordered by Governor-General Vaudreuil to attack Fort Shirley, but when he arrived with seven French soldiers and 20 Indians, they decided that the fort was too well-defended, and chose to assault Fort Bigham instead. The report adds that they "returned with 18 prisoners and five scalps." There is no definitive account of the numbers of dead or of those captured.

The Pennsylvania Gazette of 12 June 1756 reported the following account of the fort's destruction:

"We have advice from Carlisle that on Friday night last (June 11th) Capt. Bigham's fort in Tuscarora Valley was destroyed by the Indians. There is no particular account come to hand, only in general it is said that all that were in it are either killed or carried off; and that a woman, big with child, was found dead and scalped near the fort, mangled in a most shocking manner."

On 24 June the Gazette published the following list of those killed or captured:

"The following is a list of persons killed and missing at Bigham’s Fort, viz: George Woods, Nathaniel Bigham, Robert Taylor, his wife and two children, Francis Innis, his wife and two children, John McDowell, Hannah Gray, and one child missing. Some of those supposed to be burnt in the fort, as a number of bones were found there. Susan Giles was found dead and scalped in the neighborhood of the fort. Alexander McAllister and his wife, James Adams, Jane Cochran, and two children missed. McAllister’s house was burned and a number of cattle and horses driven off. The enemy was supposed to be numerous, as they did eat and carry off a great deal of beef they had killed."

=== Aftermath ===
A forty-five man scouting party searched along the Susquehanna River to Fort Augusta, and to just west of Fort Bigham, but did not find the enemy.

George Woods, (father-in-law of Pennsylvania senator James Ross), was captured during the assault and taken with other captives to Kittanning, the Lenape staging area for raids on English settlements. After running the gauntlet, Woods was adopted into the tribe. He reportedly bargained with his captors to pay an annual fee of ten pounds of tobacco for life, in exchange for his freedom. Eventually Woods was taken to Fort Pitt and released.

Francis and Margery Innis and their three children were taken to Fort Duquesne and were sold separately to French traders. Francis and Margery managed to work for their freedom and were able to return to Pennsylvania in 1759. They were reunited with two of their children (the youngest having drowned) at the release of captives brokered by Colonel Henry Bouquet in 1764.

Hannah Gray and her daughter Jane were taken to Canada and sold, but Hannah escaped and returned to Pennsylvania to find that her husband John had died. When Colonel Bouquet arranged for the release of captives in 1764, Hannah's daughter was not among them.

Samuel Bigham sold his land in 1760, left Pennsylvania and died in North Carolina in 1804.

== Rebuilding and destruction, 1760-1763 ==
Samuel Bigham sold his land to an Indian trader named Ralph Sterrett. Sterrett rebuilt the fort in 1760 because he also needed a secure location for his family and neighbors, and renamed it Bingham's Fort. According to tradition, on one occasion Sterrett provided food and hospitality to an Indian whom Sterrett saw wandering alone on the road. Years later, at the start of Pontiac's War in early 1763, Sterrett was surprised to see this same man approaching the fort. Sterrett asked him what he wanted, and the Indian reminded him of Sterrett's kindness to him, then warned him that a large band of warriors was approaching the fort "with a determination to scalp and burn all the Whites." Sterrett and his family and 80 neighbors left immediately. The warriors found the fort empty but burned it anyway. The fort was not rebuilt.

== Legacy ==
A stone marker was placed near the site of the fort on 12 June 1934 by the Juniata County Historical Society. The inscription states:

"58 rods north-west is the marked site of Fort Bigham, erected 1754 by pioneer settlers. Captured and burned by Indians June 11, 1756. The twenty or more persons in the fort were massacred or carried away. Rebuilt 1760 – destroyed by Indians 1766. The inhabitants, warned by a friendly Indian, escaped. Erected and dedicated by the Historical Society of Juniata County, June 12, 1934."

A historical marker was erected in Mifflintown in 1947 by the Pennsylvania Historical and Museum Commission.
