= Runk Bridge =

- U.S. National Register of Historic Places
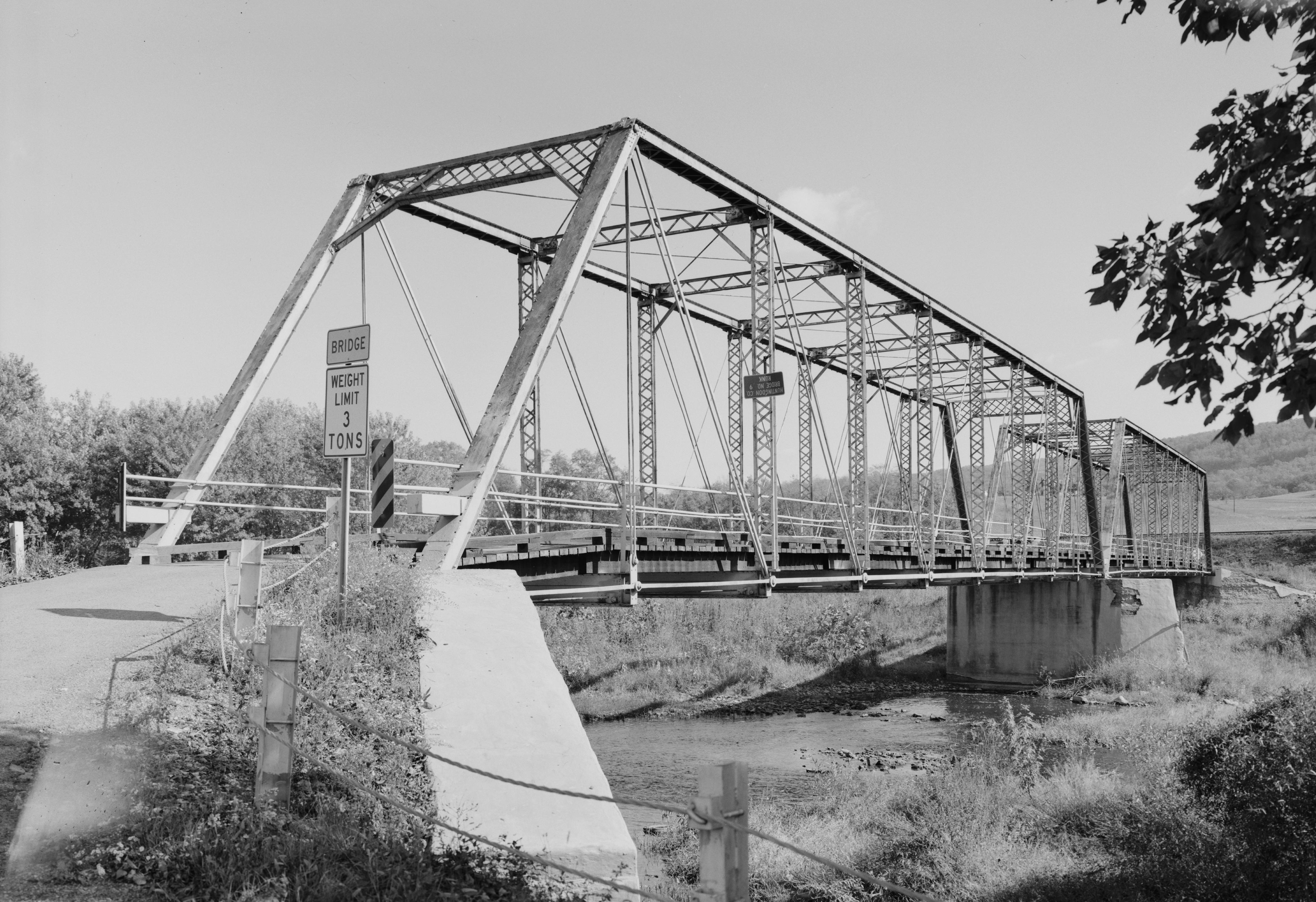
- Runk Bridge, 1986

- Location within Pennsylvania Location within the United States
- Location: Over Aughwick Creek, 1 mile (1.6 km) south of Shirleysburg off U.S. Route 522, Shirley Township, Pennsylvania
- Coordinates: 40°16′40″N 77°53′14″W
- Area: less than one acre
- Built: 1889
- Built by: Pittsburgh Bridge Co.
- Architectural style: Pratt truss bridge
- MPS: Industrial Resources of Huntingdon County, 1780--1939 MPS
- NRHP reference No.: 90000408
- Added to NRHP: March 20, 1990

Runk Bridge, also known as Huntingdon County Bridge No. 9, is a historic Pratt truss bridge spanning Aughwick Creek and located at Shirley Township, Huntingdon County, Pennsylvania, United States. It was built by the Pennsylvania Bridge Co. in 1898. It measures 134 feet (41 m) in length and has two spans.

It was added to the National Register of Historic Places in 1990.

== See also ==
- List of bridges documented by the Historic American Engineering Record in Pennsylvania
