= Lewis Smalley Homestead =

Historic house in Pennsylvania, US

- U.S. National Register of Historic Places
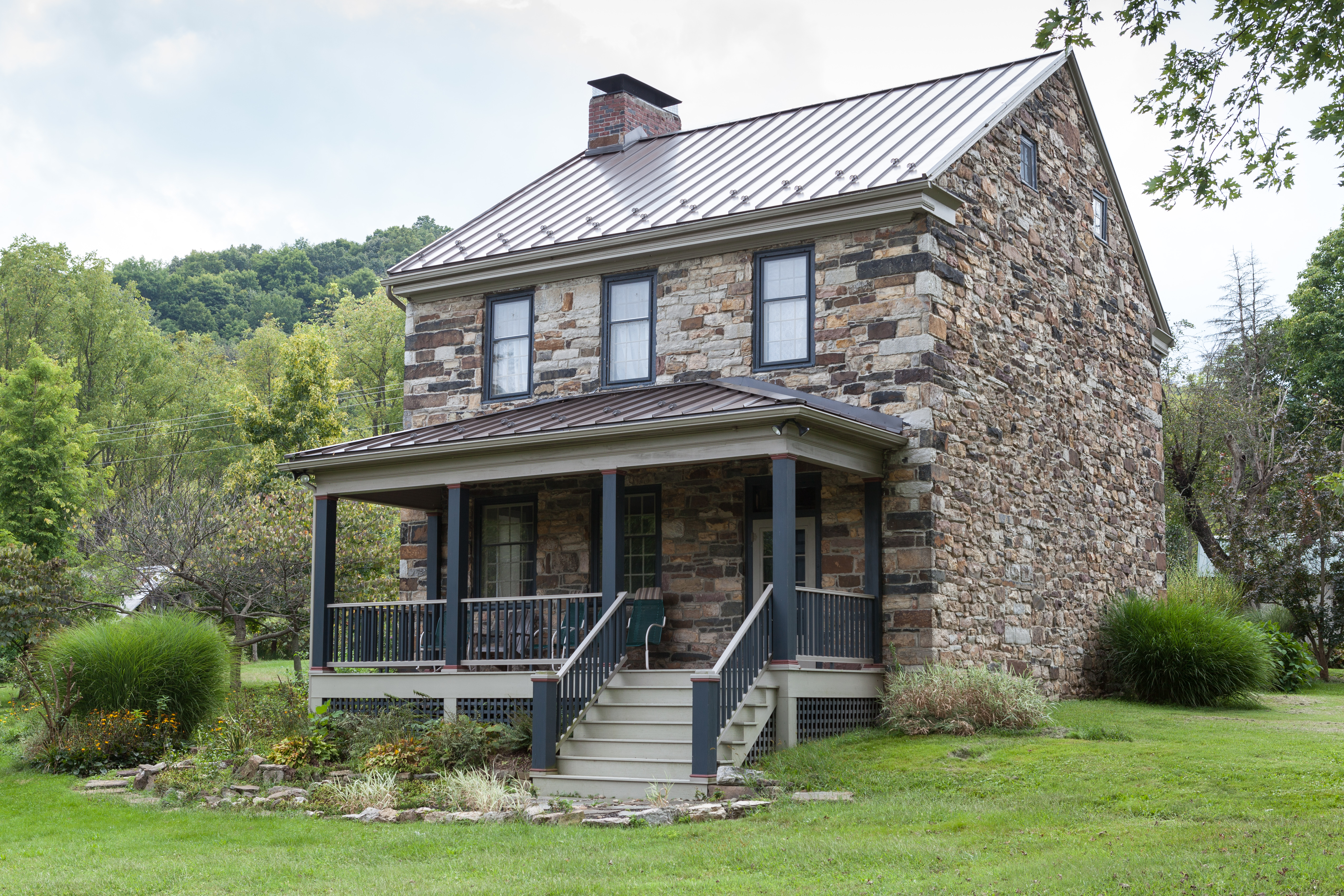
- The house in September 2014

- Location within Pennsylvania Location within the United States
- Nearest city: East of Allenport on Pennsylvania Route 103, Shirley Township, Pennsylvania
- Coordinates: 40°21′40″N 77°49′52″W
- Area: 30.1 acres (12.2 ha)
- Built: c. 1794
- NRHP reference No.: 78003088
- Added to NRHP: November 14, 1978

The Lewis Smalley Homestead, also known as Lewisburg-Sycamores, is an historic home that is located on a property on Route 103. Situated at the mouth of the Aughwick Creek, where it meets the Juniata River in Shirley Township in Huntingdon County, Pennsylvania, United States, it was built circa 1794.

It was listed on the National Register of Historic Places in 1978.

== History and architectural features ==
A 2 1/2-story, stone building, this historic structure measures three-bays wide and thirty feet by twenty-five feet. It has a tin-covered gable roof and was made of sandstone that was obtained from the river. The house retains the original woodwork, doors, hardware and unfinished chestnut flooring, as well as three original stone fireplaces.

Also located on the property is a stone bank barn, measuring forty-five feet by ninety feet. Original hardware from the local blacksmith survives in the barn. One hinge still bears the blacksmith's mark.

In late June 1863, during the American Civil War and just prior to the Battle of Gettysburg, the property was used as part of a Union garrison, which was staffed by a contingent of more than 1,500 troops that were stationed at various locations around Mount Union. Its purpose was to guard the road, valley, and bridge to prevent the possible capture and destruction of the Pennsylvania railroad by Confederate troops. In the barn, where the garrison's horses were stabled, soldiers carved their names, initials, and dates in door jambs and barn beams. Those carvings are still visible. The farm was occupied by the William Hainey Briggs family during the time of the Union encampment.

The original 540-acre property passed intact within the Smalley family until roughly 1957 when the last descendant sold it. An interim owner, Tuscarora Land Company, subdivided the original acreage in 1975. The Smalley residence now occupies twenty-eight acres.
