= Senior Officer Present Afloat =

Senior Officer Present Afloat, usually referred to as SOPA, is a U.S. Navy term to indicate the most senior officer present in a harbor occupied by more than one U.S. Navy vessel. That officer is essentially commander of all U.S. Navy operations afloat in the harbor, and is responsible to civilian authorities for the action of the ships and the behavior of crews under their command.

SOPA is a useful administrative function in foreign ports visited by U.S. Navy vessels. However, SOPA may also be established in continental U.S. ports.

== Examples of SOPA assignment ==
- A U.S. Navy minesweeper enters the harbor of Sasebo, Japan, where there are a number of U.S. Navy destroyers at anchor. The captain of the minesweeper is a lieutenant commander who, informed by message beforehand as to who is SOPA, must report to the higher-ranking SOPA, a commander, located on one of the destroyers. The SOPA will assign the minesweeper instructions as to where to anchor or dock, and instruct the minesweeper on guard duty, mail runs, boat runs, radio watch, signal light watch, liberty procedures, shore patrol assignments, and other assigned shared duties.
- A cruiser with a higher-ranking Navy officer, such as a captain, enters the same port. The commanding officer of the cruiser immediately becomes SOPA and issues their own instructions and assignments.
- During periods of cooperation between Allied navies, such as during World War II or the Korean War, the Allied officer with the highest ranking assumes the position of SOPA. In such cases, for example, the captain of a Royal Navy destroyer may be SOPA and have responsibility for smaller U.S. Navy vessels under their jurisdiction.

== Example of use ==
Rear Admiral William R. Furlong was Senior Officer Present Afloat at Pearl Harbor when it was attacked on December 7, 1941. RADM Furlong commanded Battle Forces Pacific and was on board his flagship, the old minelayer USS Oglala when the attack began. As the first bombs fell, he ordered "All ships in harbor sortie."

== SOP(A) ==
SOP(A) is the term used for "Senior Officer Present (Ashore)."
