= Fort Shirley =

18th-century fort in colonial Pennsylvania

- Shirleysburg, Huntingdon County, Pennsylvania

Site information
- Type: Military fort

Location
- Location of Fort Shirley in Pennsylvania
- Coordinates: 40°17′49″N 77°52′29″W

Site history
- Built: 1755
- In use: 1755-1756
- Battles/wars: French and Indian War

Garrison information
- Past commanders: Captain George Croghan; Captain Hugh Mercer
- Garrison: 30-60 men plus officers

Pennsylvania Historical Marker
- Designated: 1926

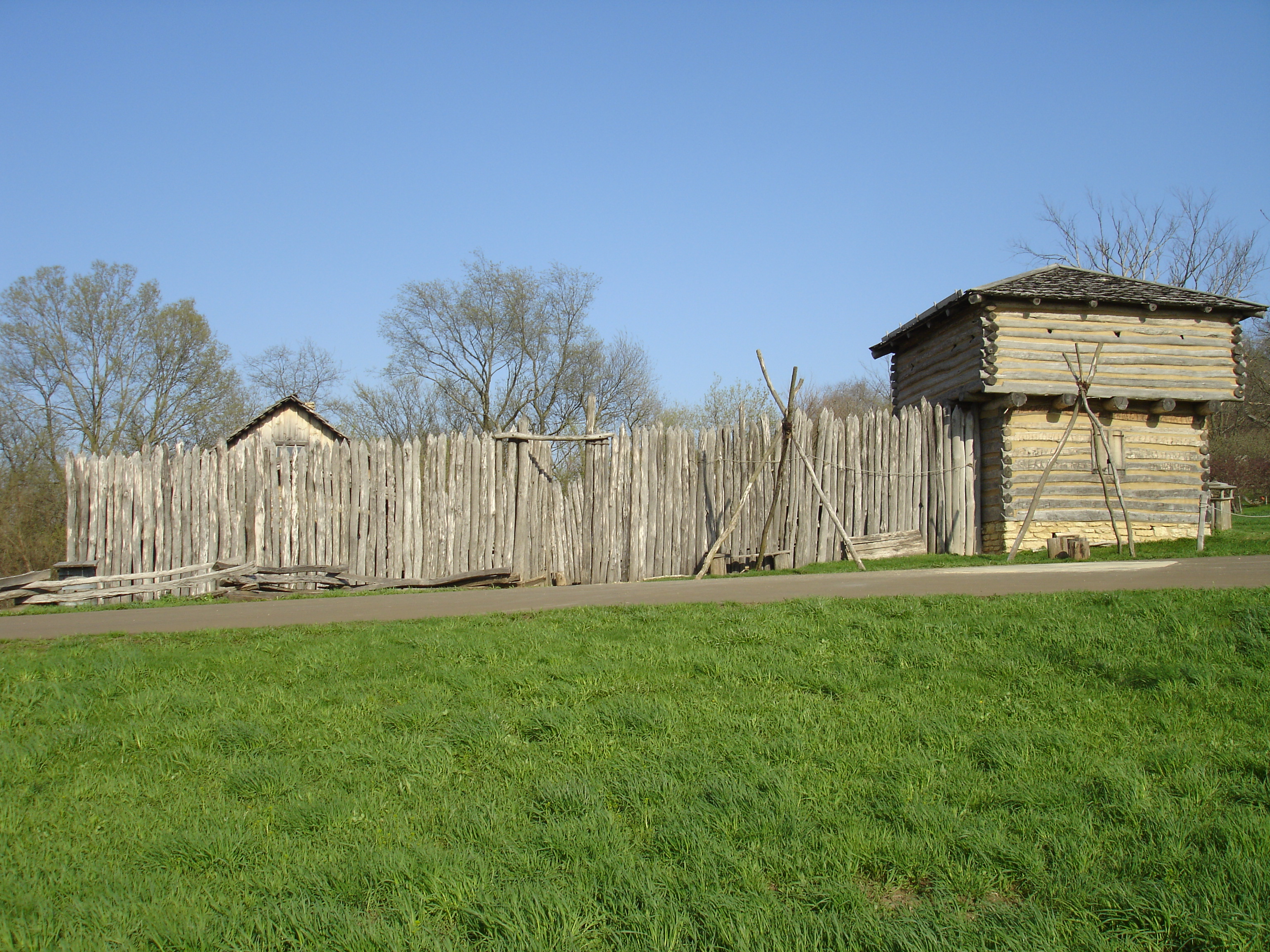
Reconstructed stockade and blockhouse similar to the original Fort Shirley.

Fort Shirley (initially known as Croghan's Fort) was a military fort located in present-day Shirleysburg, Pennsylvania. It was built in 1755 by George Croghan and later maintained by the Province of Pennsylvania during the French and Indian War. Fort Shirley was part of a defensive line of forts built in Pennsylvania during 1755 and 1756, at the start of hostilities with the French and their allied Native Americans. Although two French and Native American war parties were sent to capture it, Fort Shirley was never attacked. The fort served as the launching site for the Kittanning Expedition in September 1756, after which it was abandoned.

1770 map of the Province of Pennsylvania showing Fort Shirley below and to the left of the map's center.

== History ==
=== Location and description ===
No contemporary description of the fort survives, but in 1875 Milton Scott Lytle interviewed a man who had played in the ruins of the fort as a child. He told Lytle: "It was a log fort of considerable strength and size, standing on the edge of the plateau, south of the Fort Run and west of the road entering Shirleysburg from Mount Union."

=== Construction ===
In 1753, George Croghan built a trading post and homestead at Aughwick Creek and the Juniata River. The trading post grew into a small community called Aughwick Old Town, augmented by some two hundred Iroquois, Lenape, and Shawnee refugees who had fled to Aughwick following the destruction of Logstown in July 1754. Conrad Weiser visited Aughwick in September 1754 and found it surrounded by fields of corn, squash and pumpkins as well as "about twenty cabins [with]...at least 200 Indians, men, women and children." Among these refugees was the Seneca leader Tanacharison. In December 1754 Richard Peters wrote to Croghan that his trading post "ought to be fortified for the Security of the Province...Is it not absolutely necessary for the Settlers of Cumberland County to have a Place of Security to the West of the Blue Hills, and on this side of the Allegheny Hills? If so, can there be a more proper place than Auckquick?"

In September 1755, Croghan began fortifying his post to protect against Native American attacks after General Edward Braddock's defeat at the Battle of the Monongahela. The stockade, known initially as "Croghan's Fort," was intended to protect Croghan's stores (he was a prosperous Indian fur trader), as well as other settlers and the Native American refugees. Croghan wrote to Major General William Johnson that "I have been Oblig'd to Rase a Volunteer Company on My own Expense and am building a Small Stockade fort." By mid-October, Croghan had completed a stockaded blockhouse. He received numerous warnings from his Native American friends, including Scarouady, to leave or his fort would be destroyed. On 12 November 1755, following the Penn's Creek massacre and the Great Cove massacre, he wrote to Governor Morris: "I have but a stockade fort at Aughwick and have about forty men with me there, but how long I shall be able to keep it, I really can't tell."

=== Military history ===
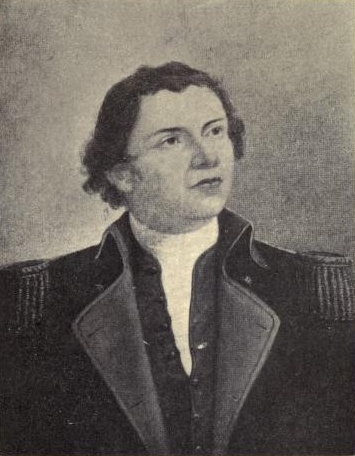
Captain Hugh Mercer.

In December 1755, the fort was taken over by the government of the Province of Pennsylvania, garrisoned with provincial troops, and Croghan was given a captain's commission. In January 1756, the fort was named Fort Shirley in honor of William Shirley, who was appointed Commander-in-Chief of the British Army in North America upon the death of General Braddock. On 9 February, Governor Morris wrote to General Shirley:

"...about twenty miles northward of Fort Lyttelton, at a place called Aughwick, another fort is erected something larger than Fort Lyttelton, which I have taken the liberty of naming Fort Shirley. This stands near the great path used by the Indians and Indian traders, to and from the Ohio."

Croghan was assigned to build several other forts and to recruit men for their garrisons, and this required him to leave Fort Shirley. In March 1756 he resigned, unhappy with the way the Provincial government was managing the war, and Captain Hugh Mercer took command of Fort Shirley.

On 18 April, Mercer wrote to Governor Morris that he found the 30-man garrison preparing to desert as they had not been paid for several months. He was unable to complete repairs at the fort due to lack of tools, and discovered that many of the garrison's 30 guns were unfit for use. There was a lack of gunpowder and lead for making bullets. Mercer requested that the garrison be doubled to 60 men.

Fort Shirley, along with Fort Granville, Fort Lyttleton, and Fort Patterson, formed a defensive chain that stretched from the lower Juniata River and Aughwick Creek valleys. After Braddock's defeat, these forts came under attack by several Native American tribes, as well as French troops. French correspondence shows that, in June 1756, Ensign Pierre-Louis Boucher Niverville de Montizambert was ordered by Governor-General Vaudreuil to attack Fort Shirley, but when he arrived with seven French soldiers and 20 Indians led by the Lenape chief Tamaqua, they decided that the fort was too well-defended, and chose to assault Fort Bigham instead.

In March 1756, Croghan received a warning from Native American friends that preparations were being made by François Coulon de Villiers to assault Fort Shirley, and in July a combined force of 100 warriors and 55 French troops were sent to attack the fort. Villiers reportedly lost his way and decided instead to attack Fort Granville. On 2 August 1756, the French succeeded in taking Granville, killing the lieutenant in charge of the fort and capturing 22 soldiers, 3 women, and 5 or 6 children.

=== Kittanning Expedition ===
Immediately after Fort Granville was burned, Colonel John Armstrong began planning an attack on the Lenape village of Kittanning, which served as a staging area for raids against English settlements, and where Captain Jacobs and Shingas, two prominent Lenape leaders, were believed to be residing. Troops gathered at Fort Shirley and made their way through a roadless stretch of mountains and forest to the village, which they destroyed on 8 September 1756, killing Captain Jacobs and rescuing 11 captives. Captain Mercer participated in the attack. He and a number of other soldiers who were separated in the fighting straggled back to Fort Shirley during the days following the expedition.

=== Abandonment ===
Following the attack on Kittanning, Colonel Armstrong wrote to Deputy Governor William Denny that Fort Shirley would be difficult to defend from a major assault:

"As Fort Shirley is not easily defended, and their water may be taken possession of by the enemy, it running at the foot of a high bank eastward of the fort and no well dug, I am of opinion, from its remote situation, that it cannot serve the country in the present circumstances, and if attacked, no doubt will be taken if not strongly garrisoned, but, extremities excepted, I cannot evacuate this without your Honour's orders."

On 15 October 1756, Governor Denny announced to the Council at Philadelphia that Fort Shirley was to be evacuated by his order. In late October, the Pennsylvania Regiment abandoned and destroyed Fort Shirley because "the fort [was] untenable and of no further use, the inhabitants of Sherman's Valley having entirely abandoned their plantations."

== Archaeology ==
Using maps and title deeds as guidance, archaeologists uncovered traces of the fort adjacent to the Benjamin B. Leas House, also known as the Shirleysburg Female Seminary, in present-day Shirleysburg, Pennsylvania. In 2009, a metal detector survey uncovered musket balls and pewter buttons dating to the 18th century, in addition to a copper charm which probably belonged to an African slave or indentured servant, bearing the inscription "No god but Allah" in Arabic. In 2011, the Pennsylvania State University archaeological field school found several charred palisade logs that may have been part of the fort's stockade, as well as wire-wound glass trade beads, a Jew's harp, Native American pottery sherds and flint tools. In 2012 the complete outline of the fort's foundations was identified, including original palisade trenches indicating that the fort was 135 feet by about 165 feet.

Excavations from 2010-2012 found a total of 25,786 artifacts, including some over 8,000 years old. In 2013-2014 the dig uncovered a bake oven, a privy and a trash midden. Analysis of animal bones found in the area provided evidence about the diet of soldiers stationed at the fort.

== Memorialization ==
A historical marker was placed on the west side of U.S. Route 522 near Aughwick Creek, Shirleysburg on 29 May, 1926. A stone marker with a brass plaque stands near by, also erected in 1926, by the Pennsylvania Historical Commission and the Society of Pennsylvania Women in New York. A third marker stands on Croghan Pike near the site of the fort.

The Fort Shirley Heritage Association operates a museum which holds artifacts found in the vicinity of the fort, including Native American artifacts and blacksmith tools. There is also a replica of George Croghan’s trading post.

== See also ==
- Fort Lyttleton
- Fort Bigham
- George Croghan
- Fort Granville
- Pennsylvania forts in the French and Indian War
