= Special routes of U.S. Route 22 =

Special routes of U.S. Route 22

Highway system
- United States Numbered Highway System; List; Special; Divided

At least eight special routes of U.S. Route 22 (US 22) have existed and at least six have been decommissioned.

== Pennsylvania ==
=== Green Tree–Pittsburgh temporary route ===
U.S. Route 22 Temporary
- Location: Green Tree–Pittsburgh, Pennsylvania

=== Pittsburgh truck route ===
U.S. Route 22 Truck
- Location: Pittsburgh, Pennsylvania

=== Churchill–Monroeville business loop ===
U.S. Route 22 Business
- Location: Monroeville, Pennsylvania
- Length: 5 mi (8.0 km)

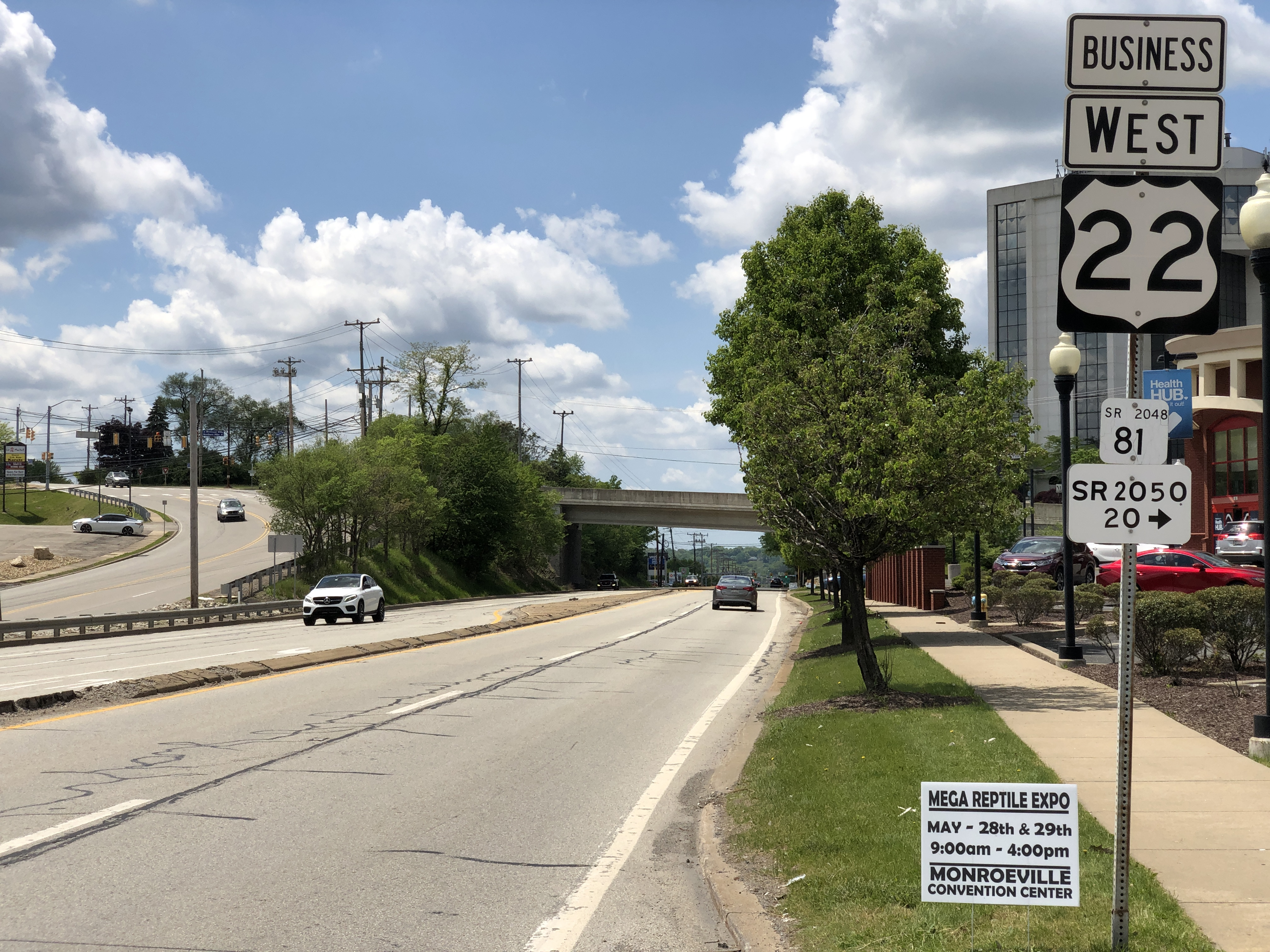
US 22 Bus. westbound at Northern Pike in Monroeville, Pennsylvania

U.S. Route 22 Business (US 22 Bus.) is a five-mile (8.0 km) loop through the eastern Pittsburgh suburbs of Churchill, Wilkins Township, and Monroeville, Pennsylvania, on William Penn Highway. The route's western terminus is at a freeway junction with Interstate 376 (I-376), which features a concurrency by the business loop's parent route. The route was the former pathway of US 22 itself before the construction that extended I-376 from this point eastward to the Pennsylvania Turnpike, in the early 1960s. The first two miles (3.2 km) of the road are contained in a valley, surrounded by a variety of side roads leading to suburban, mostly residential development. The remaining three miles (4.8 km) feature dense commercial development, including several office high rises and Monroeville Mall. The highway ends at a complicated junction that features the northern terminus of Pennsylvania Route 48 (PA 48), the southern end of Haymaker Road, and I-376, which features its last two exits (before the Pennsylvania Turnpike) with the above streets. US 22 Bus. then travels for its final eighth of a mile (0.201 km) on a viaduct that allows for connections with the Pennsylvania Turnpike and a smooth transition on to US 22 east (continuing William Penn Highway) toward suburban Murrysville.

Major intersections

The entire route is in Allegheny County.

Location	mi	km	Destinations	Notes
Churchill	0.00	0.00	I-376 west / US 22 west – Pittsburgh	Western terminus; exit 80 on I-376
Churchill	0.19	0.31	PA 791 north / Yellow Belt (Rodi Road) – Penn Hills	Western end of Yellow Belt concurrency; southern terminus of PA 791
Churchill	0.87	1.40	Yellow Belt (Lower Rodi Road) – Turtle Creek	Interchange; eastern end of Yellow Belt concurrency
Monroeville	2.49	4.01	Monroeville Mall	Interchange
Monroeville	4.14	6.66	I-376 west (Mosside Boulevard) / US 22 west (Haymaker Road) / PA 48 south / Orange Belt – Pittsburgh, McKeesport	Northern terminus of PA 48; exit 84A on I-376
Monroeville			I-76 Toll / Penna Turnpike – Ohio, Harrisburg	Eastbound exit and westbound entrance; exit 57 on I-76 / Turnpike
Monroeville	4.38	7.05	US 22 east – Murrysville	Eastern terminus
1.000 mi = 1.609 km; 1.000 km = 0.621 mi: Concurrency terminus; Electronic toll collection

=== Lewistown business loop ===
U.S. Route 22 Business
- Location: Lewistown, Pennsylvania
- Length: 5 mi (8.0 km)

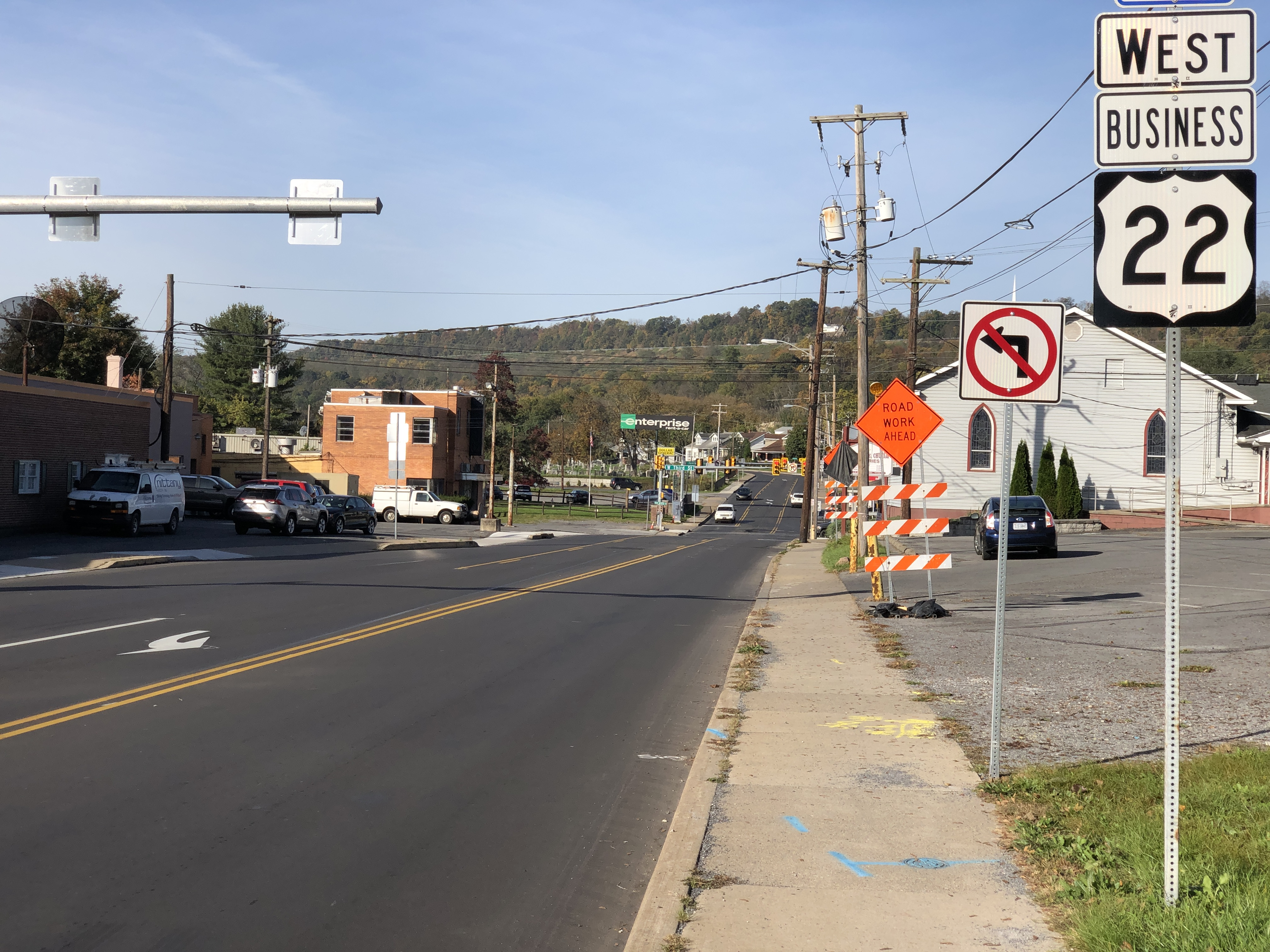
US 22 Bus. westbound past PA 103 in Lewistown, Pennsylvania

U.S. Route 22 Business (US 22 Bus.) is a five-mile (8.0 km) loop through Lewistown, Pennsylvania. It serves as the major through street, taking on the former designation of its parent, which has become a freeway bypass. The first two miles (3.2 km) of the route travel through rural Granville Township. The middle two-mile (3.2 km) segment is lined with small development and features several stoplights and a segment that contains a center turning lane. The last two miles (3.2 km) wind along the Juniata River toward the eastern freeway juncture in Derry Township.

Major intersections

The entire route is in Mifflin County.

Location	mi	km	Destinations	Notes
Granville Township	0.00	0.00	US 22 / US 522 – Mt. Union, Lewistown, Harrisburg	Interchange
Lewistown	2.98	4.80	PA 103 south (Memorial Street) – Mattawana	Northern terminus of PA 103
Lewistown	3.41	5.49	Charles Street to US 322 west / US 522 north – State College, Selinsgrove	Eastbound exit and westbound entrance
Derry Township	5.02	8.08	US 22 east / US 322 east – Harrisburg	Interchange; access to eastbound US 22/US 322 and from westbound US 22/US 322
1.000 mi = 1.609 km; 1.000 km = 0.621 mi: Incomplete access

=== Harrisburg bypass route ===
U.S. Route 22 Bypass
- Location: Harrisburg, Pennsylvania
- Existed: 1930s–1978

U.S. Route 22 Bypass (US 22 Byp.) was a bypass of the routing of US 22 through downtown Harrisburg, Pennsylvania, from the 1930s to 1978. The bypass began at US 22/US 322 (Front Street/2nd Street) along the Susquehanna River and headed east on Maclay Street. Upon intersecting PA 230 (Cameron Street), US 22 Byp. ran southeast on Arsenal Boulevard and east on Herr Street before it reached its eastern terminus at US 22 (Walnut Street) near Penbrook. US 22 Byp. was first designated by 1940 between US 22 and US 230 at the intersection of Cameron and Maclay streets in Harrisburg and US 22 near Penbrook, following Arsenal Boulevard and Herr Street. In the 1940s, US 22 Byp. was extended west along Maclay Street to end at US 22/US 322/PA 14 (Front Street), running concurrent with US 230. In the 1950s, the route east of US 230 became concurrent with US 230 Byp. The US 230 and US 230 Byp. concurrencies were removed during the 1960s. On June 29, 1978, the American Association of State Highway and Transportation Officials (AASHTO) approved the removal of the US 22 Byp. designation; the route was replaced by US 22 along Arsenal Boulevard and Herr Street.

Major intersections

The entire route was in Dauphin County.

Location	mi	km	Destinations	Notes
Harrisburg	0.000	0.000	US 22 east / US 322 east (Front Street)	
Harrisburg	0.064	0.103	US 22 west / US 322 west (2nd Street)	
Harrisburg	1.040	1.674	PA 230 east (Cameron Street)	
Penbrook	3.150	5.069	US 22 (Walnut Street)	Mileage from Google Maps.
1.000 mi = 1.609 km; 1.000 km = 0.621 mi

=== Bethlehem–Easton alternate route ===
U.S. Route 22 Alternate
- Location: Bethlehem–Easton, Pennsylvania
- Existed: 1930s–1950s

U.S. Route 22 Alternate (US 22 Alt.) was an alternate route of US 22 that ran between the cities of Bethlehem and Easton in Pennsylvania between the 1930s and 1950s. The alternate route began at US 22 and PA 12 at the intersection of Main and Union streets in downtown Bethlehem, heading east on Union Street. The route briefly turned north along Linden Street before it headed east on Goepp Street, which became Pembroke Road as it left Bethlehem. US 22 Alt. became Freemansburg Avenue and passed through Freemansburg. The route continued east to Wilson, where it came to its eastern terminus at US 22 (Butler Street). US 22 Alt. was first designated in the 1930s, beginning at US 22 and PA 12 at the intersection of Main and Goepp streets in Bethlehem and following Goepp Street, Pembroke Road, and Freemansburg Avenue to US 22 at Butler Street in Wilson. In the 1940s, US 22 Alt. was shifted to use Union Street to intersect US 22 and PA 12 in Bethlehem. The US 22 Alt. designation was decommissioned during the 1950s.

Major intersections

The entire route was in Northampton County.

Location	mi	km	Destinations	Notes
Bethlehem			US 22 / PA 12 (Main Street/Union Street)	
Wilson			US 22 (Butler Street)	
1.000 mi = 1.609 km; 1.000 km = 0.621 mi

== New Jersey ==
=== Phillipsburg alternate route ===
U.S. Route 22 Alternate
- Location: Phillipsburg, New Jersey
- Existed: 1938–1993

U.S. Route 22 Alternate (US 22 Alt.) was an alternate route of US 22 located in Phillipsburg, New Jersey. The route began at the Northampton Street Bridge over the Delaware River to Easton, Pennsylvania. From here, the alternate route followed South Main Street through Phillipsburg. US 22 Alt. headed into Pohatcong Township and became New Brunswick Avenue. Here, the route formed a short concurrency with County Route 519 (CR 519) and continued east to its eastern terminus at US 22. US 22 Alt. was first designated in the 1940s to run along the former alignment of US 22 through Easton and Phillipsburg that was bypassed. The alternate route began at US 22 at the intersection of 7th and Northampton streets in Easton and ran east along Northampton Street to the Northampton Street Bridge into New Jersey. At this point, US 22 Alt. became concurrent with Route 28 and ran through Phillipsburg on South Main Street and Pohatcong Township on New Brunswick Avenue before ending at US 22. In the 1953 New Jersey state highway renumbering, the concurrent Route 28 designation in New Jersey was removed. During the 1950s, the western terminus of US 22 Alt. was moved to the Northampton Street Bridge, with PA 45 replacing the route along Northampton Street in Easton. On October 23, 1993, AASHTO approved the removal of the US 22 Alt. designation. The route was replaced by CR 678 and Route 122.

Major intersections

County	Location	mi	km	Destinations	Notes
Northampton	Easton			Northampton Street west	Pennsylvania state line
Delaware River				Northampton Street Bridge	
Warren	Pohatcong Township			CR 519 north (St James Avenue)	Western terminus of CR 519 overlap
Warren	Pohatcong Township			CR 519 south (Hawk Avenue) – Alpha	Eastern terminus of CR 519 overlap
Warren	Pohatcong Township			US 22 to I-78 / Route 173	
1.000 mi = 1.609 km; 1.000 km = 0.621 mi

== Pennsylvania-New Jersey ==
=== Easton–Phillipsburg bypass route ===
U.S. Route 22 Bypass
- Location: Easton, Pennsylvania–Phillipsburg, New Jersey
- Existed: 1930s–1940s

U.S. Route 22 Bypass (US 22 Byp.) was the designation for a bypass of the segment of US 22 through the downtown areas of Easton, Pennsylvania, and Phillipsburg, New Jersey, between the 1930s and 1940s. The bypass began at US 22 (Northampton Street) in Easton and headed northeast on Prospect Avenue, Pearl Street, and Bushkill Street, intersecting US 611 (3rd Street). The route crossed the Delaware River on the Easton–Phillipsburg Toll Bridge into New Jersey, where it ran east concurrent with Route 24 on Morris Street. US 22 Byp. turned southeast along Route 24-28 Link to end at US 22/Route 28 in Pohatcong Township. The bypass route was designated in the 1930s. In the 1940s, US 22 Byp. was replaced with mainline US 22, with the former alignment of US 22 through Easton and Phillipsburg becoming US 22 Alt.

Major intersections

County	Location	mi	km	Destinations	Notes
Northampton	Easton			US 22 (Northampton Street) – Phillipsburg, Bethlehem	
Northampton	Easton			US 611 (3rd Street) – Stroudsburg, Philadelphia	
Delaware River				Easton–Phillipsburg Toll Bridge	
Warren	Phillipsburg			Route 24 west (Morris Street)	Western terminus of Route 24 overlap
Warren	Lopatcong Township			Route 24 east – Washington	Eastern terminus of Route 24 overlap, western terminus of Route 24-28 Link overlap
Warren	Pohatcong Township			US 22 / Route 28 (New Brunswick Avenue) – Alpha	Eastern terminus of Route 24-28 Link overlap
1.000 mi = 1.609 km; 1.000 km = 0.621 mi

== See also ==
- List of special routes of the United States Numbered Highway System
