= Shirleysburg, Pennsylvania =

Borough in Pennsylvania, US

- Borough
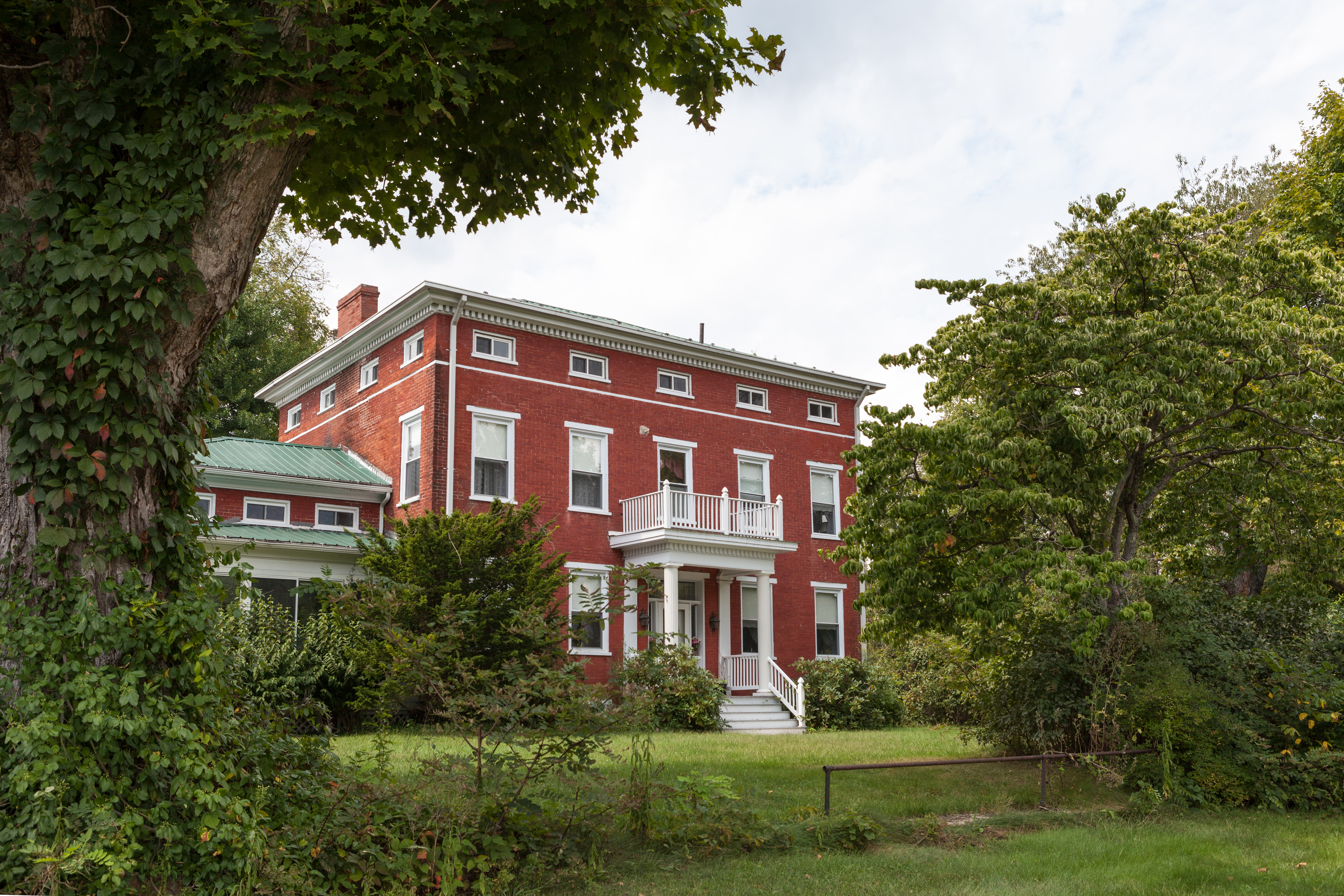
- Benjamin B. Leas House

- Location of Shirleysburg in Huntingdon County, Pennsylvania.

- Location within Pennsylvania Location within the United States
- Coordinates: 40°17′51″N 77°52′31″W
- Country: United States
- State: Pennsylvania
- County: Huntingdon

Government
  - Type: Borough Council

Area
  - Total: 0.16 sq mi (0.41 km^{2})
  - Land: 0.16 sq mi (0.41 km^{2})
  - Water: 0 sq mi (0.00 km^{2})
- Elevation: 584 ft (178 m)

Population (2010)
  - Total: 150
  - Estimate (2019): 139
  - Density: 870.2/sq mi (335.98/km^{2})
- Time zone: UTC-5 (Eastern (EST))
  - Summer (DST): UTC-4 (EDT)
- ZIP code: 17260
- Area code: 814
- FIPS code: 42-70408
- GNIS feature ID: 1215280
- Local phone exchanges: 447, 448

Shirleysburg is a borough in Huntingdon County, Pennsylvania, United States. As of the 2020 census, Shirleysburg had a population of 141.

== History ==
Shirleysburg was originally the site of, and takes its name from, Fort Shirley, a French and Indian War fort. In 1754, the Oneida chief Monacatoocha (Scarouady) led about 200 pro-British Native Americans (Iroquois, Lenape, and Shawnee) from their village of Logstown on the western frontier, to take refuge at George Croghan's trading post. That same year, Croghan built a stockaded blockhouse known as Croghan's Fort. Following General Edward Braddock's defeat in July 1755, Governor Robert Hunter Morris ordered it renamed Fort Shirley and had several other forts built in a defensive line, to protect settlers from Native American attacks. The fort was abandoned in late 1756 because it was considered too difficult to defend.

On April 3, 1837, Shirleysburg was incorporated as a borough. In 1840 the population was 247. The narrow gauge East Broad Top Railroad (EBT) was constructed through Shirleysburg in 1873. It continued to serve the town for 83 years, until it ceased operations in 1956. Since 1960, EBT tourist trains have operated from Rockhill to Colgate Grove, just south of town, where a wye was constructed to turn trains. The inactive tracks pass through the community on their way to Mount Union.

The Benjamin B. Leas House was listed on the National Register of Historic Places in 1984.

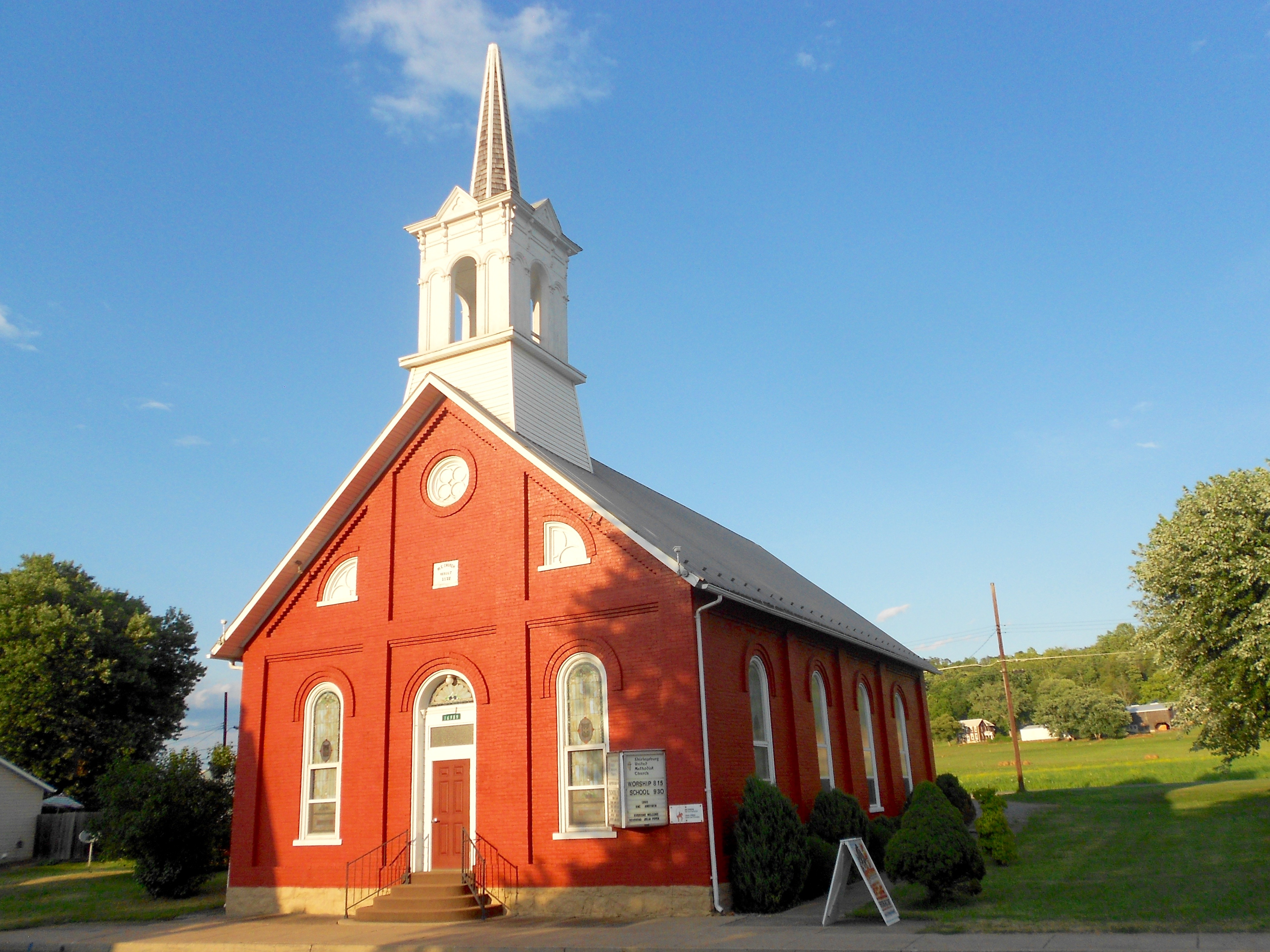
Shirleysburg United Methodist Church

== Geography ==
Shirleysburg is located in southeastern Huntingdon County in the valley of Aughwick Creek, between Blacklog Mountain to the east and Jacks Mountain to the west. U.S. Route 522 passes through the borough, leading north 6 miles (10 km) to Mount Union and south 4 miles (6 km) to Orbisonia, next to Rockhill.

According to the United States Census Bureau, Shirleysburg has a total area of 0.4 square kilometres (0.2 sq mi), all land. The western border of the borough follows Aughwick Creek, a northward-flowing tributary of the Juniata River.

== Demographics ==
Historical population
Census	Pop.	Note	%±
1840	247		—
1850	361		46.2%
1860	354		−1.9%
1870	320		−9.6%
1880	367		14.7%
1890	325		−11.4%
1900	230		−29.2%
1910	256		11.3%
1920	200		−21.9%
1930	217		8.5%
1940	242		11.5%
1950	241		−0.4%
1960	170		−29.5%
1970	238		40.0%
1980	147		−38.2%
1990	140		−4.8%
2000	140		0.0%
2010	150		7.1%
2020	141		−6.0%

As of the census of 2000, there were 140 people, 61 households, and 38 families residing in the borough. The population density was 878.5 inhabitants per square mile (339.2/km^{2}). There were 64 housing units at an average density of 401.6 per square mile (155.1/km^{2}). The racial makeup of the borough was 97.86% White, 1.43% Native American, 0.71% from other races. Hispanic or Latino of any race were 0.71% of the population.

There were 61 households, out of which 26.2% had children under the age of 18 living with them, 49.2% were married couples living together, 9.8% had a female householder with no husband present, and 36.1% were non-families. 31.1% of all households were made up of individuals, and 16.4% had someone living alone who was 65 years of age or older. The average household size was 2.30 and the average family size was 2.82.

In the borough the population was spread out, with 25.7% under the age of 18, 5.0% from 18 to 24, 23.6% from 25 to 44, 29.3% from 45 to 64, and 16.4% who were 65 years of age or older. The median age was 42 years. For every 100 females there were 100.0 males. For every 100 females age 18 and over, there were 96.2 males.

The median income for a household in the borough was $26,250, and the median income for a family was $40,625. Males had a median income of $27,083 versus $18,750 for females. The per capita income for the borough was $13,586. There were 5.7% of families and 13.6% of the population living below the poverty line, including 19.4% of under eighteens and 22.2% of those over 64.
