= Shirley Township, Pennsylvania =

Township in Pennsylvania, US

Coordinates: 40°21′00″N 77°44′58″W

- Township
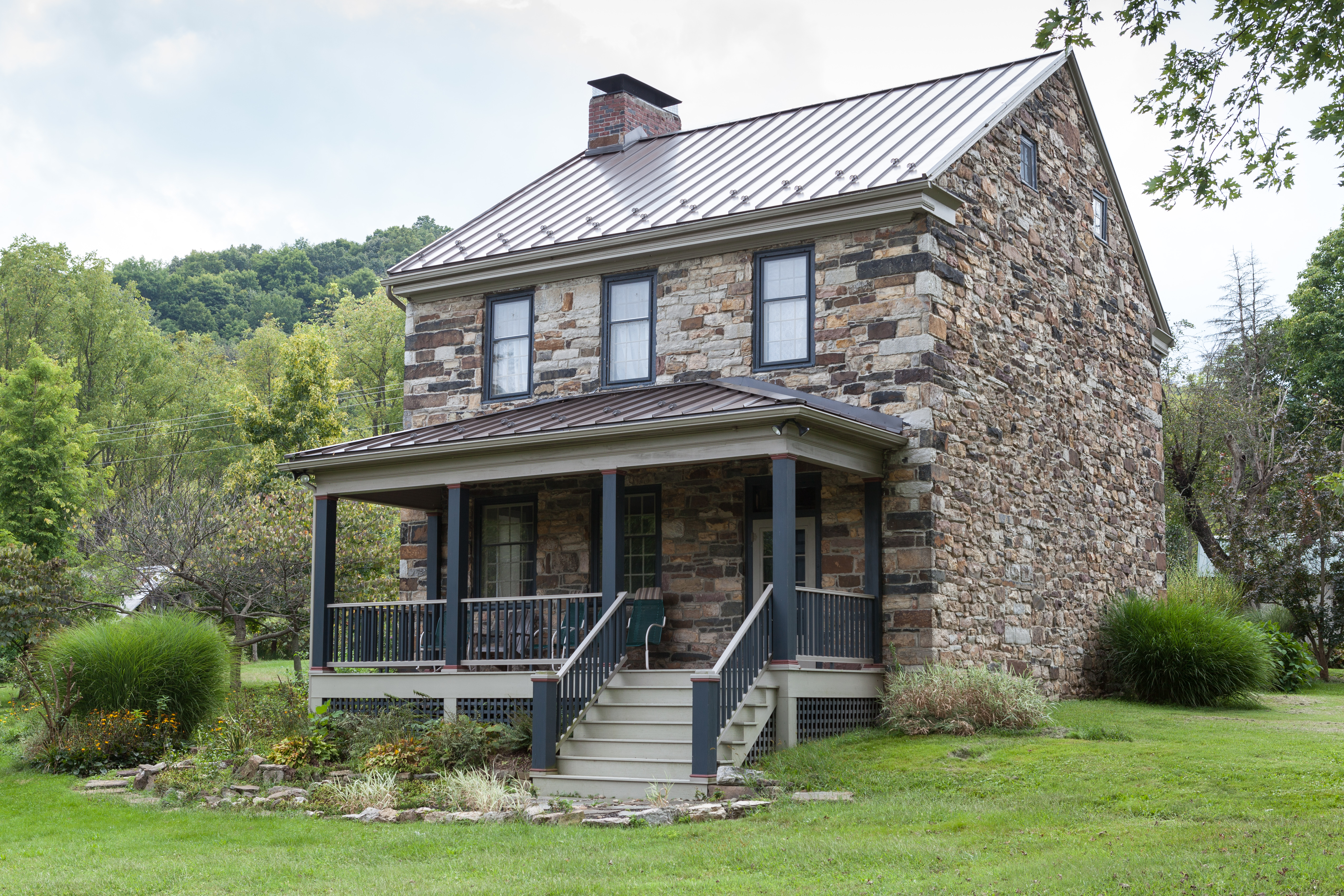
- The Lewis Smalley Farmhouse, built 1794

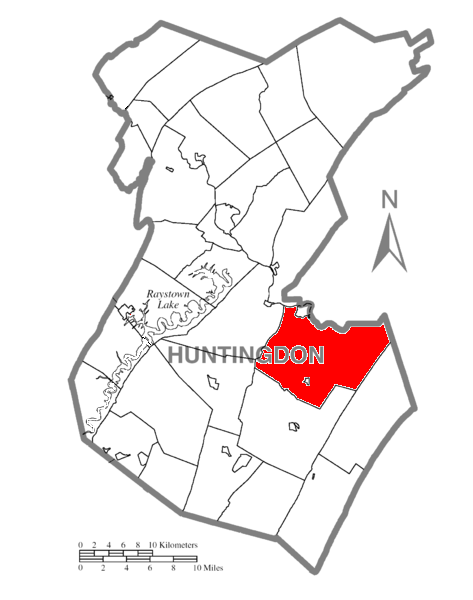
- Map of Huntingdon County, Pennsylvania Highlighting Shirley Township

- Map of Huntingdon County, Pennsylvania
- Country: United States
- State: Pennsylvania
- County: Huntingdon

Area
  - Total: 58.67 sq mi (151.96 km^{2})
  - Land: 58.42 sq mi (151.30 km^{2})
  - Water: 0.25 sq mi (0.66 km^{2})

Population (2020)
  - Total: 2,407 ▼
  - Estimate (2022): 2,385
  - Density: 42.6/sq mi (16.45/km^{2})
- Time zone: UTC-5 (Eastern (EST))
  - Summer (DST): UTC-4 (EDT)
- Zip code: 17066, 17260
- Area code: 814
- FIPS code: 42-061-70400
- Local phone exchanges: 447, 448, 542, 543

Shirley Township is a township in Huntingdon County, Pennsylvania, United States. The population was 2,407 at the 2020 census.

== History ==
The Runk Bridge and Lewis Smalley Homestead are listed on the National Register of Historic Places.

== Municipal Office ==
The Shirley Township Municipal Building is located on Croghan Pike between Allenport and Shirleysburg.

== Geography ==
According to the United States Census Bureau, the township has a total area of 58.5 square miles (151.6 km^{2}), of which 58.2 square miles (150.8 km^{2}) is land and 0.3 square mile (0.9 km^{2}) (0.56%) is water.

== Demographics ==
Historical population
Census	Pop.	Note	%±
2000	2,526		—
2010	2,524		−0.1%
2020	2,407		−4.6%
2022 (est.)	2,385		−0.9%
U.S. Decennial Census

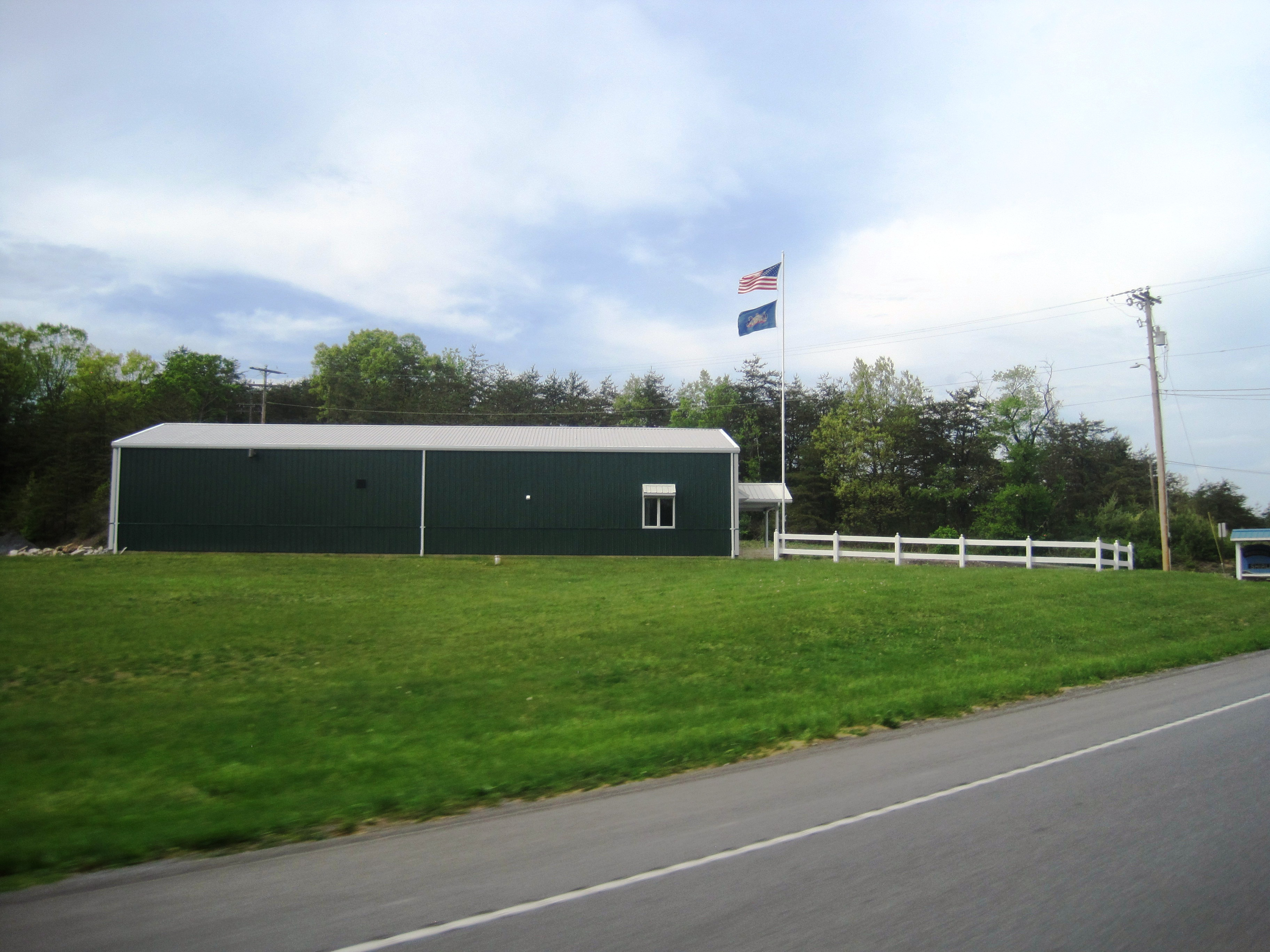
Shirley Town Hall

As of the census of 2000, there were 2,526 people, 988 households, and 728 families residing in the township. The population density was 43.4 inhabitants per square mile (16.8/km^{2}). There were 1,272 housing units at an average density of 21.8/sq mi (8.4/km^{2}). The racial makeup of the township was 98.50% White, 0.63% African American, 0.12% Native American, 0.28% Asian, and 0.48% from two or more races. Hispanic or Latino of any race were 0.71% of the population.

There were 988 households, out of which 30.6% had children under the age of 18 living with them, 60.4% were married couples living together, 8.0% had a female householder with no husband present, and 26.3% were non-families. 22.7% of all households were made up of individuals, and 10.3% had someone living alone who was 65 years of age or older. The average household size was 2.51 and the average family size was 2.91.

In the township the population was spread out, with 23.6% under the age of 18, 7.1% from 18 to 24, 27.0% from 25 to 44, 27.0% from 45 to 64, and 15.3% who were 65 years of age or older. The median age was 39 years. For every 100 females there were 97.7 males. For every 100 females age 18 and over, there were 94.7 males.

The median income for a household in the township was $31,366, and the median income for a family was $36,386. Males had a median income of $30,662 versus $19,115 for females. The per capita income for the township was $15,757. About 8.3% of families and 13.1% of the population were below the poverty line, including 19.2% of those under age 18 and 12.1% of those age 65 or over.
