= Juniata Terrace, Pennsylvania =

Borough in Pennsylvania, US

- Borough
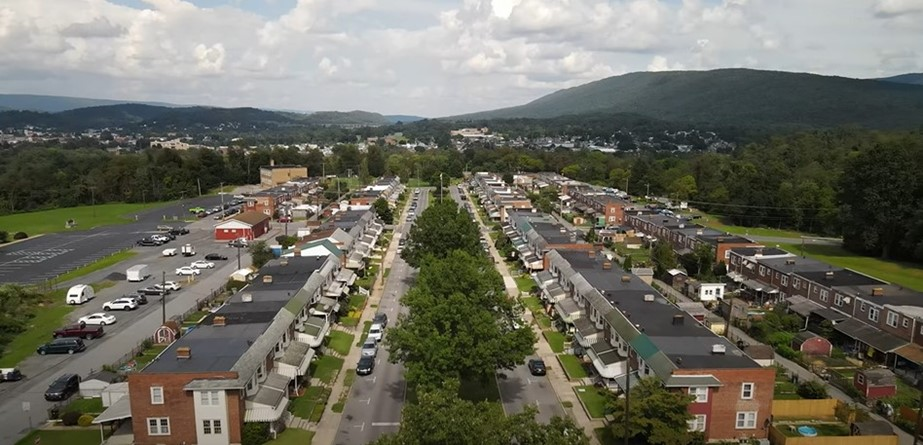

- Location of Juniata Terrace in Mifflin County, Pennsylvania.

- Location within Pennsylvania Location within the United States
- Coordinates: 40°35′05″N 77°34′49″W
- Country: United States
- State: Pennsylvania
- County: Mifflin

Government
  - Type: Borough Council
  - Mayor: John Wagner
  - Council President: Doug Kepler
  - Council Vice President: Eric Rhodes

Area
  - Total: 0.17 sq mi (0.43 km^{2})
  - Land: 0.17 sq mi (0.43 km^{2})
  - Water: 0 sq mi (0.00 km^{2})
- Elevation: 558 ft (170 m)

Population (2020)
  - Total: 564
  - Density: 3,361.2/sq mi (1,297.76/km^{2})
- Time zone: UTC-5 (Eastern (EST))
  - Summer (DST): UTC-4 (EDT)
- Zip code: 17044
- Area code: 717
- FIPS code: 42-38640
- Website: www.juniataterrace.net/5001.html

Juniata Terrace, a former industrial village, is a borough in Mifflin County, Pennsylvania, United States. The population was 567 at the 2020 census. Juniata Terrace was added to the National Register of Historic Places as a historic district on May 17, 2024.

== History ==
Modern chemistry during the Industrial Revolution invented products that made life more affordable and convenient. One major product was rayon. Of the three ways to manufacture it, the British firm of George Courtauld & Co. purchased the patent for the manufacturing of ‘viscose’ rayon in 1906. Perfecting the manufacturing process, they looked to the exploding population of the United States to establish manufacturing.

=== American Viscose Co. ===
In 1909 Courtauld founded the American Viscose Co. in Philadelphia and built their first rayon manufacturing plant in Marcus Hook, PA. With enormous success, a second plant was built in Roanoke, VA in 1916.

The demand for rayon, also named artificial silk at the time, continued to far surpass production capabilities. A third plant was scheduled for construction in Lewistown. The first phase opened here in 1921, employing over 1,400 men and women. Demand continued to increase, so a plant expansion was started in May, 1922 to double the size of the workforce. Subsequent expansions through 1928 made employment soar to almost 5,000 men and women. Women exceeded 40% of the workforce.

American Viscose had to look to western PA to find additional employees. Many working in the coal mines found the new rayon plant working conditions better and the Lewistown area appealing. The company decided to build an industrial village to house the new workers.

=== Birth of Juniata Terrace ===
Land was found just south of the plant, on a hill that was a 150-acre farm. Owned as an investment by Dr. Henry Sweigart of Lewistown, almost half of the farm was slated for the new industrial village. On May 17, 1922 American Viscose Co. purchased the farm for $45,000. Dr. Swigart was given the honor of naming the new village, “Juniata Terrace.”

The Shade family was renting the farm from Dr. Sweigart. American Viscose continued to rent approximately 80 acres to the Shade’s. They were told that they could stay as long as they wished. For the next 51 years, Bill Shade operated and lived on the farm, even beyond the closing of the Lewistown plant. American Viscose kept its promise.

=== Design of Juniata Terrace ===
The Philadelphia architecture firm of Bellinger & Perrot designed the three American Viscose plants, including the Lewistown plant with its expansions. During that time, Emile G. Perrot left the company and started his own firm to concentrate on designs of buildings for universities and churches. His work was so respected that American Viscose asked him to design the new community of Juniata Terrace.

Perrot traveled Europe and the US extensively to adopt design styles for the villages under his direction. His first was a village at the Marcus Hook Viscose plant and then a larger industrial village in Wilmington, DE. To alleviate the feeling of congestion, he used a popular design concept from the Garden Cities movement that provided for open space and greenways within a community of closely built homes. Perrot decided this would be the best approach for the industrial village of Juniata Terrace.

Perrot chose a red brick, Late 19th and Early 20th Century American Movements house style for the village. This architecture style allowed Perrot to employ cost-saving, repetitive designs while assimilating the row homes within the Garden City community. Perrot’s use of multiple architectural design influences were certainly significant for the enduring historic qualities of Juniata Terrace. Although the features were simplistic, the totality of the village layout, the repetitive front porches and bay windows and the slanted rooflines come together to form a harmonious design.

Formally organized around one large, central green-space boulevard in four sections, four blocks of row homes align the boulevard on each side. The front of the eight blocks of row homes face the centralized green space known as Terrace Boulevard. One additional block of homes is situated behind the first block of Terrace Blvd., fronting Hudson Avenue. Those homes face north. Two other blocks arranged linearly are situated behind the south side of the first two blocks of Terrace Blvd. Those homes face south, fronting Delaware Avenue. The fourth block of Terrace Boulevard is set at an angle, providing some relief to the linear layout.

The village consisted of 250 homes, the elementary school, the store building with a grocery store and a drug store and 112 garages. The grocery store was originally leased by the Weis Pure Foods Stores, today’s Weis Markets. A full playground was built for the school and village. American Viscose gifted the land for the church in 1950. It opened in 1952. Today, the village is the same except that 52 of the garages remain and the school is being repurposed.

The village was considered the most modern for its time, with homes having full plumbing, a coal furnace in the basement for central heating, all electrical wiring enclosed within the walls of the homes, and piped sewage from each home underground to the disposal plant. The residents were given the option of telephone service since Bell Telephone provided the lines to the homes. Twelve windows, and nineteen in the end and break homes, provide considerable natural sunlight and ventilation. The original design and features are still current for today’s living requirements.

Each home featured a living room, a dining room and a kitchen on the first floor, with a full bathroom, three bedrooms and closets on the second floor. The front porches are still an important feature, and the second-floor bay windows and sloping roofs add character to the fronts of the homes. The back yards feature a hair-pin iron fence with a gate. The popular “Green and Cream” trim made a uniform appearance, still in practice today.

=== Construction ===
The Ballinger Co. was hired to manage construction and design the storm drainage and sewer system. This included the building of a modern sewage treatment plant. The H.C. Ambler Co. was the excavator and the Brocklehurst Co. was the general contractor, both from Philadelphia. Hundreds of various trade workers were hired. Sub-contractors provided wallpapering, furnaces and landscaping. A number of local companies participated in construction and supply of materials.

A spur rail line was constructed up the hill from the Pennsylvania Rail Road to the corner of today’s Delaware Ave. and Rt. 103. This was necessary to deliver the massive earth moving equipment and the tons of building supplies. The project required millions of feet of lumber, bricks and wallboard, over 3,000 windows and 3,000 doors, drainage and sewer pipes, kitchen and bathroom appliances and fixtures, and much more over the next two years.

After the train from Philadelphia arrived, ground was broken on Monday, June 25, 1923. The “big cut” was excavated to create the terraced area for the community. The removed dirt was pushed to create the space for the school, playground and stores (and eventually the church). The first home was occupied by the Allen family in December, 1924. Daughter Sandy still lives in a home at Juniata Terrace. The last home was occupied in December, 1925. The streets and sidewalks were completed early in 1926 and the boulevards were planted with grass, bushes, trees and flowers that fall. The stores opened in 1927. The school was gifted to the School District of Granville Township on August 30, 1928, just prior to its opening.

=== Residents ===
As landlords, American Viscose Co. required at least one person on the lease of each home to work at the Lewistown plant. In some cases, one or more did, with a wife, and even adult children. Rent was initially $1.00 a week, deducted from weekly earnings. With the residents’ annual earnings of $1,100 to $1,300 a year, this was a considerable relief to families. By May, 1944, the weekly rent increased to $4.60, still a significant benefit. It is not surprising that there was a long wait-list of employees wanting to live at Juniata Terrace.

The 1930 census shows that there were 1,710 residents, with 610 working for American Viscose. Some homes had upwards of 13 occupants. A number of homes took in borders- usually family members or close friends who were on a wait list to get their own home at Juniata Terrace. Cots for sleeping in the basement must have been a cozy life.

There was a maintenance person on site, employed by American Viscose. If something needed repaired, it was his responsibility. Paint and wall papering was refreshed when needed. All outside areas were maintained by American Viscose.

Some have called Juniata Terrace a company town, which is incorrect. Other than required employment at American Viscose, there were no other requirements of the residents. There was no company script, no company store where purchases were required or any of the horrific conditions for which company towns received such dire reputations. American Viscose got it right when they called it an industrial village.

=== After American Viscose ===
When American Viscose was sold in 1949, its new owner did not want to own and support housing for its workers. So, all homes were offered for sale to the renter. The last home was purchased in December, 1950. From that point, the streets and public lands of Juniata Terrace became the ward of Granville Township and the new Juniata Terrace Civic Association. Improvements were made through the years by the Civic Association, building a cable TV system in 1954, a second playground in circa 1959 and a new community building in 1961. It also erected its War Memorial honoring those residents who gave their lives for our freedom.

In 1967, Juniata Terrace became a borough independent of Granville Township, as its own governing entity with a Mayor and Borough Council. More improvements continued, such as street lighting and the paving of alleys. In 1972, when the Viscose closed after destruction by Hurricane Agnes, many residents at Juniata Terrace lost their jobs. Unlike what has happened to industrial towns across America, Juniata Terrace did not die. Even after a devastating fire in 2014 affecting 25 homes, it quickly rebounded.

The Garden City design of Juniata Terrace was significant in creating an environment for the enjoyment and benefit of its residents. It supported the unified society of Juniata Terrace, allowing its residents to maintain its own middle-class social order without it being boxed in as a closed society. In turn, residents’ participation in churches, schools, recreation and other activities in Lewistown blended the two communities into a larger social entity.

Juniata Terrace has survived the Great Depression, major wars, its sale by American Viscose, the closing of American Viscose and a major fire.

== Geography ==
Juniata Terrace is located at 40°35′5″N 77°34′49″W (40.584795, −77.580160).

According to the United States Census Bureau, the borough has a total area of 0.1 square miles (0.26 km^{2}), all land.

== Demographics ==
Historical population
Census	Pop.	Note	%±
1970	733		—
1980	631		−13.9%
1990	556		−11.9%
2000	502		−9.7%
2010	542		8.0%
2020	564		4.1%
2021 (est.)	564	Steady	0.0%

As of the census of 2000, there were 502 people, 223 households, and 148 families residing in the borough. The population density was 3,939.8 inhabitants per square mile (1,521.2/km^{2}). There were 233 housing units at an average density of 1,828.6 per square mile (706.0/km^{2}). The racial makeup of the borough was 97.61% White, 1.39% African American, 0.20% Native American, and 0.80% from two or more races. Hispanic or Latino of any race were 0.40% of the population.

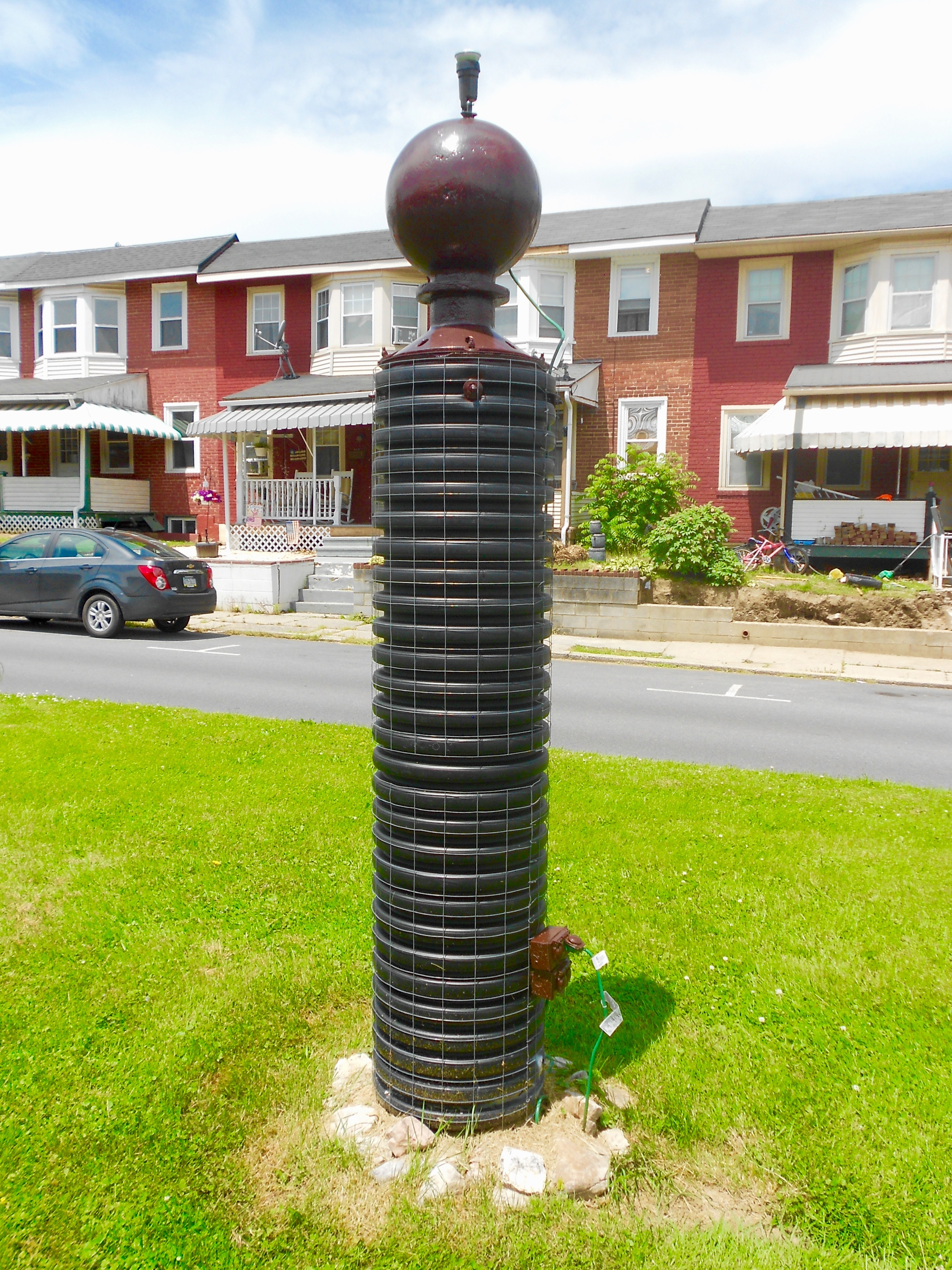
Strange object on Terrace Boulevard

There were 223 households, out of which 28.3% had children under the age of 18 living with them, 49.8% were married couples living together, 12.6% had a female householder with no husband present, and 33.2% were non-families. 30.5% of all households were made up of individuals, and 17.0% had someone living alone who was 65 years of age or older. The average household size was 2.25 and the average family size was 2.77.

In the borough the population was spread out, with 23.3% under the age of 18, 5.8% from 18 to 24, 29.7% from 25 to 44, 20.1% from 45 to 64, and 21.1% who were 65 years of age or older. The median age was 39 years. For every 100 females there were 89.4 males. For every 100 females age 18 and over, there were 86.0 males.

The median income for a household in the borough was $29,286, and the median income for a family was $33,750. Males had a median income of $25,694 versus $18,864 for females. The per capita income for the borough was $14,398. About 2.6% of families and 7.8% of the population were below the poverty line, including 12.3% of those under age 18 and 4.5% of those age 65 or over.
