= Allenport, Huntingdon County, Pennsylvania =

Unincorporated community in Pennsylvania, US

- Census-designated place
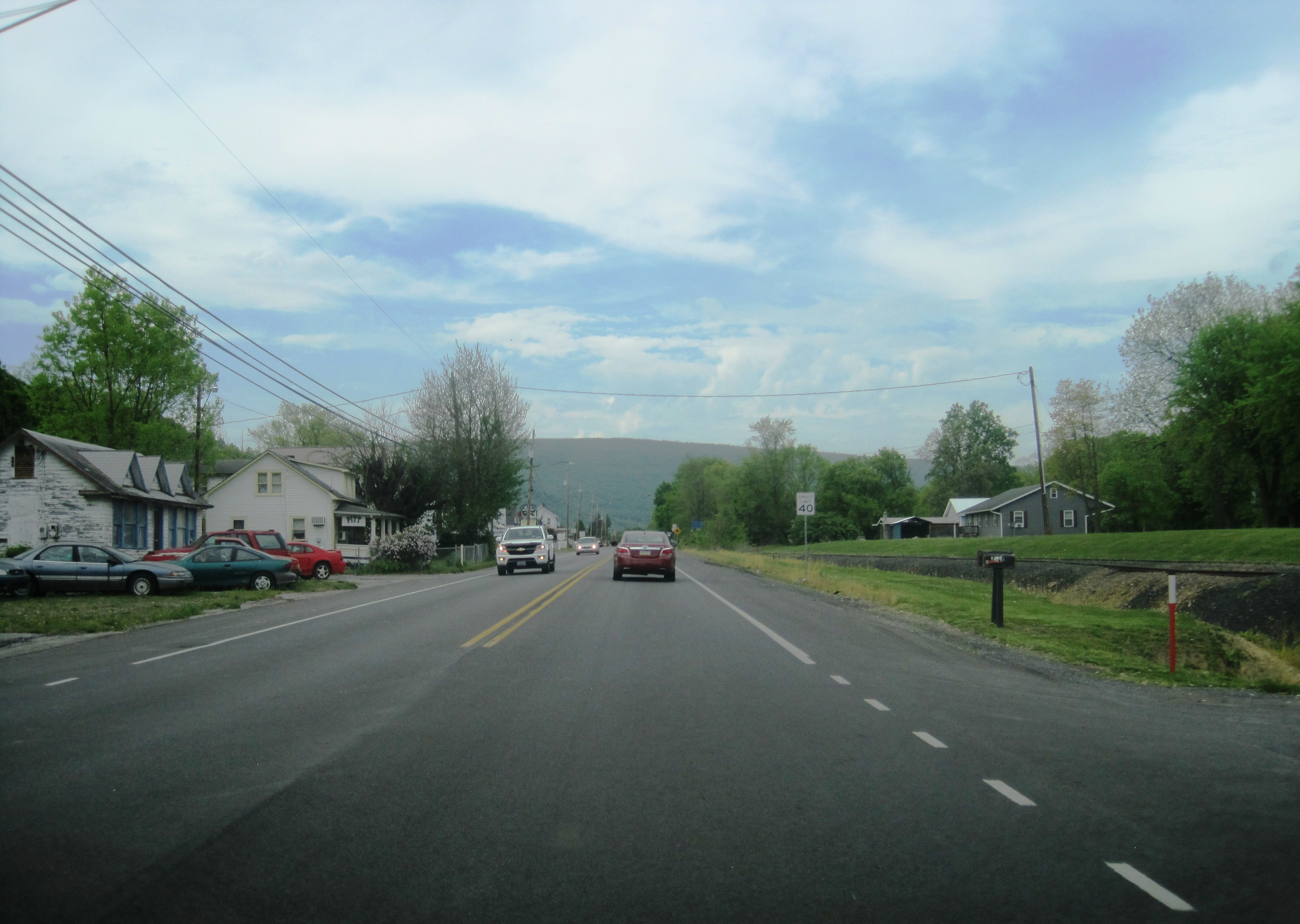
- Northbound US 522 in Allenport

- Location within Pennsylvania Location within the United States
- Coordinates: 40°22′25″N 77°52′26″W
- Country: United States
- State: Pennsylvania
- County: Huntingdon
- Township: Shirley

Area
  - Total: 1.04 sq mi (2.69 km^{2})
  - Land: 0.97 sq mi (2.51 km^{2})
  - Water: 0.069 sq mi (0.18 km^{2})
- Elevation: 594 ft (181 m)

Population (2020)
  - Total: 572
  - Density: 589.8/sq mi (227.71/km^{2})
- Time zone: UTC-5 (Eastern (EST))
  - Summer (DST): UTC-4 (EDT)
- ZIP code: 17066
- Area code: 814
- FIPS code: 42-00980
- GNIS feature ID: 2629994

Allenport is an unincorporated community and census-designated place (CDP) in Huntingdon County, Pennsylvania, United States. It lies southeast of Mount Union on the Juniata River in Shirley Township. The population was 648 as of the 2010 census.

Allenport is the location of the Riverview Business Center, home of manufacturing facilities for Bonney Forge, FCI (formerly Berg), and Containment Solutions (formerly Fluid Containment).

== Geography ==
Allenport is in eastern Huntingdon County, bordered to the north by the borough of Mount Union and to the northeast across the Juniata River by the borough of Kistler in Mifflin County. U.S. Route 522 passes through Allenport, leading north into Mount Union and south 5 miles (8 km) to Shirleysburg. Pennsylvania Route 103 has its southern terminus at US 522 in Allenport, and leads northeast (downstream along the Juniata River) 18 miles (29 km) to Mattawana.

The inactive tracks of the narrow-gauge East Broad Top Railroad pass through Allenport. A third rail creates dual-gauge tracks to just short of the PA 103 crossing. The tracks were partially rehabilitated in the mid-2000s by the Mount Union Connecting Railroad, but the rehabilitation was not completed.

According to the U.S. Census Bureau, the Allenport CDP has a total area of 1.0 square mile (2.7 km^{2}), of which 0.97 square miles (2.5 km^{2}) are land and 0.08 square miles (0.2 km^{2}), or 6.71%, are water.

== Demographics ==
Historical population
| Census | Pop. | Note | %± |
|---|---|---|---|
| 2020 | 572 | | — |
U.S. Decennial Census

== General information ==
- ZIP Code: 17066
- Area Code: 814
- Local Phone Exchanges: 542, 543
- School District: Mount Union Area School District
