= Aughwick Creek =

Creek in Pennsylvania, United States

Coordinates: 40.24926°N 77.91993°W

Aughwick Creek is a 30.9-mile-long (49.7 km) tributary of the Juniata River in Huntingdon County, Pennsylvania in the United States.

Aughwick Creek, born from the confluence of Little Aughwick Creek and Sideling Hill Creek near the community of Maddensville, joins the Juniata River a few miles below Mount Union.

== Bridges ==
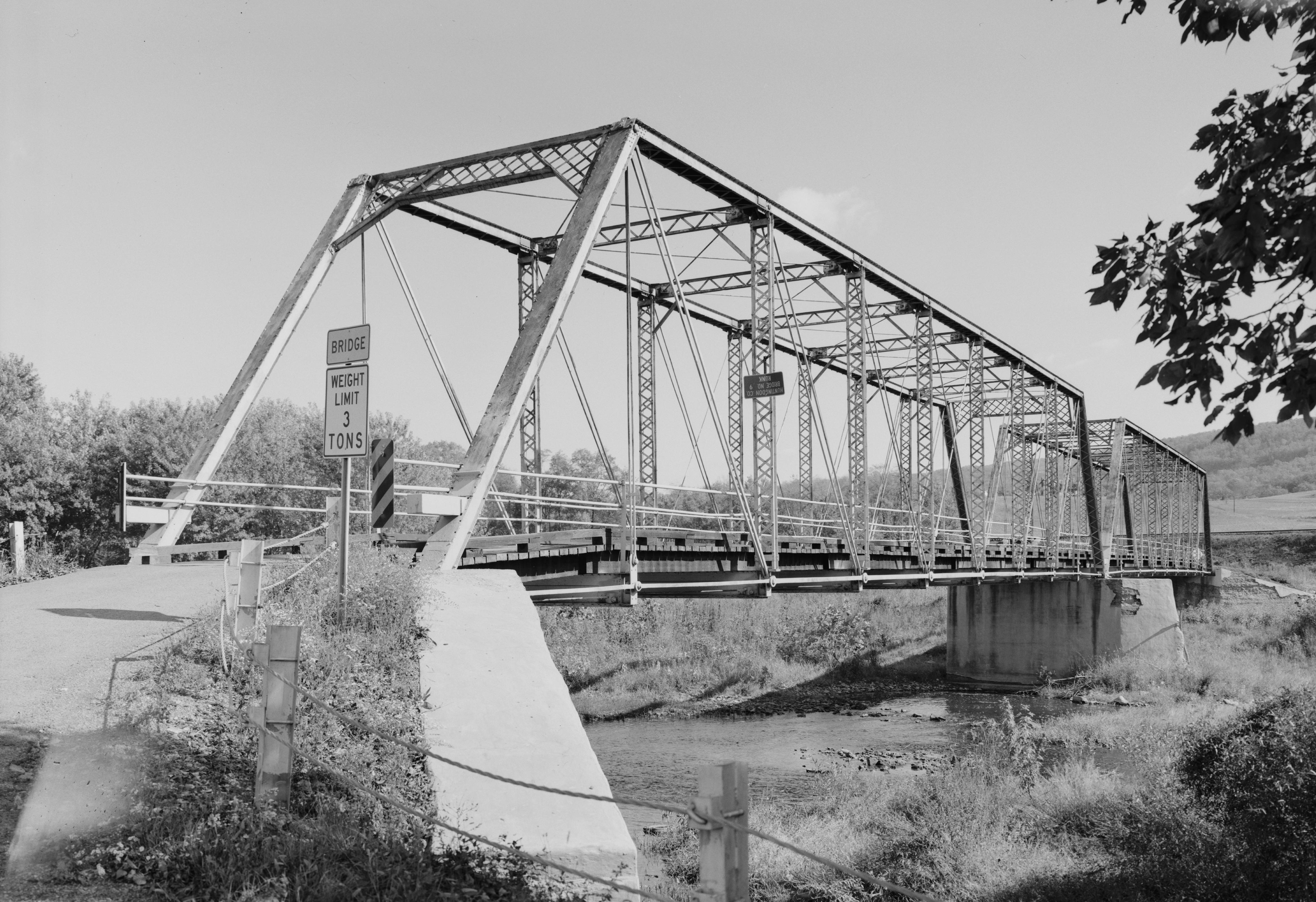
Runk Bridge over Aughwick Creek at Shirley Township

- The Runk Bridge crosses Aughwick Creek at Shirley Township.

== See also ==
- List of rivers of Pennsylvania
