= Stone Mountain (Pennsylvania) =

Highest point
- Elevation: 2,192 ft (668 m)
- Coordinates: 40°32′55″N 077°50′34″W

Geography
- Location: Pennsylvania, U.S.
- Parent range: Appalachian Mountains
- Topo map: USGS Allensville (PA) Quadrangle

Stone Mountain is a stratigraphic ridge that is located in central Pennsylvania, United States, trending northwest of the Jacks Mountain ridge and Jacks Mountain Anticline. The ridge line separates Kishacoquillas Valley from the Seven Mountains area. Stone Mountain lies in, and the ridge line forms part of the border between, Mifflin and Huntingdon counties.

Pennsylvania Route 305 crosses the ridge and follows a valley along a fault line at 40°37′46″N 77°45′31″W near Greenwood Furnace State Park. Allensville Road also crosses the ridge crest north of Allensville, and Barrville Road passes through a wind gap west of Barrville. There are no water gaps carrying rivers through the ridge. The Saddler Creek passes the southern foot of the ridge near the town of Mill Creek.

== Geology ==
Just below the ridge crest lies the contact between the older Ordovician Juniata Formation on the southeast slope, and the younger more erosion resistant Silurian Tuscarora Formation geologic layer forming the steeper northwest slope and the crest.

The Bald Eagle Formation crops out on the Kishacoquillas Valley-facing slopes of Stone Mountain, forming a steep topographic bench below the Juniata Formation. Below the Bald Eagle Formation, the uppermost sandstone layer of the underlying Reedsville Formation contain brachiopods and other marine fossils.

Across the Kishacoquillas Valley, on the opposite side of the Jacks Mountain anticline, the same rock layers are repeated in reverse order on Jacks Mountain.
