= Jacks Mountain =

Mountain in Pennsylvania, United States

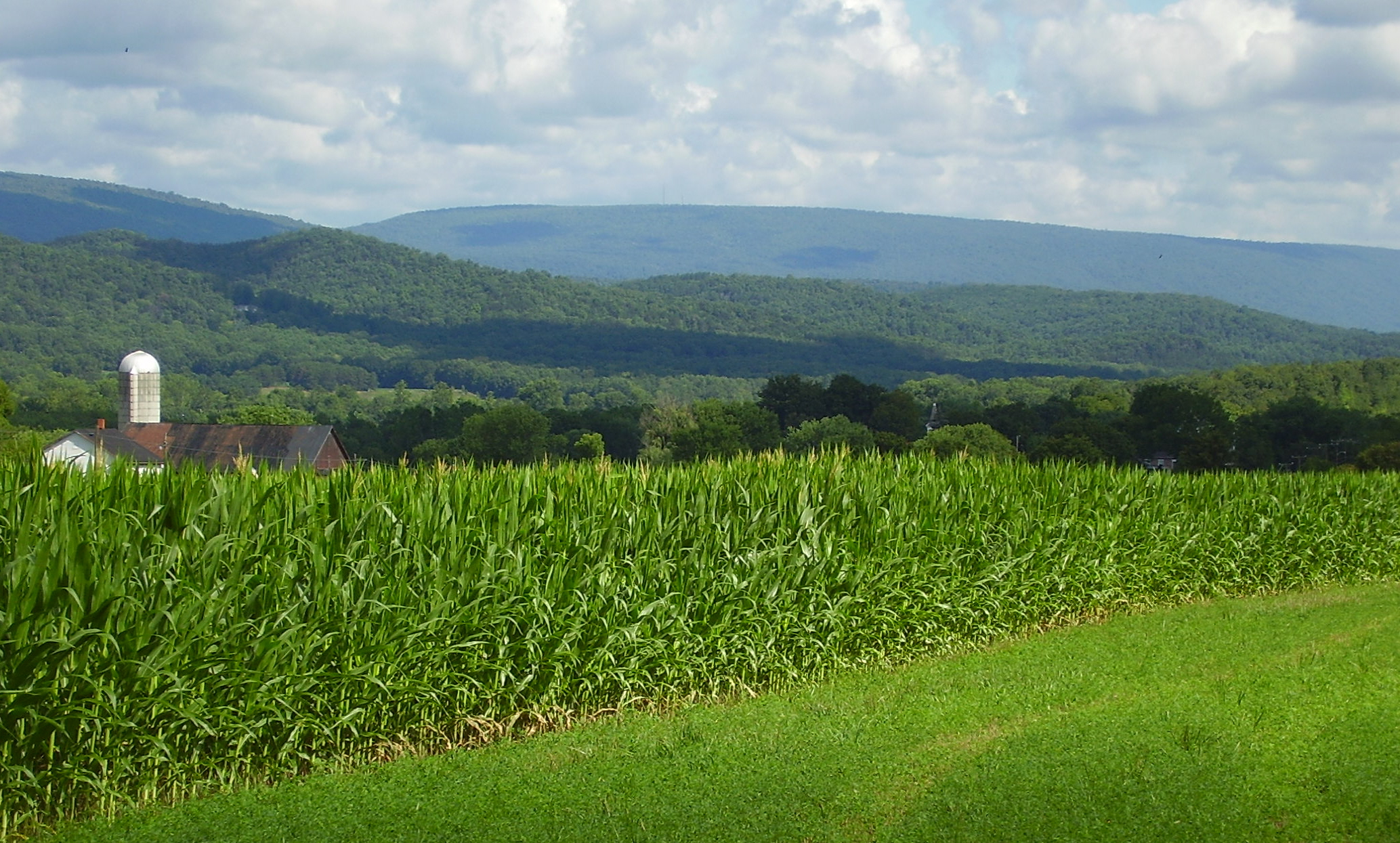
- Jacks Mountain highpoint

Highest point
- Elevation: 2,321 ft (707 m)
- Coordinates: 40°37′43″N 77°37′53″W

Geography
- Location: Pennsylvania, U.S.
- Parent range: Appalachian Mountains
- Topo map: USGS Barrville (PA) Quadrangle

Jacks Mountain is a stratigraphic ridge which is located in central Pennsylvania, United States, trending southeast of the Stone Mountain ridge and Jacks Mountain Anticline. The ridge line separates Kishacoquillas Valley from the Ferguson and Dry Valleys.

Jacks Mountain lies in Mifflin, Huntingdon, Snyder, and Union Counties, and the ridge line forms part of the border between Huntingdon and Mifflin Counties.

== History ==
This mountain was named for Jack Armstrong, an eighteenth-century fur trader. During the autumn of 1743, Armstrong confiscated the horse of Mushemeelin, a Delaware Indian from Shamokin who was in debt to Armstrong. Mushemeelin and two Delaware companions tracked Armstrong to the Juniata River narrows and, in 1744, killed the trader and his two servants. The site was thereafter known as "Jack's Narrows".

U.S. Route 22 (US 22), the William Penn Highway, and the former Pennsylvania Main Line, now the Norfolk Southern Railway's Pittsburgh Line, follow the Juniata River through the Jacks Narrows water gap between Mapleton and Mount Union. U.S. Route 322 and the former Milroy Branch of the Pennsylvania Railroad pass through the Mann Narrows Water Gap along the Kishacoquillas Creek near Reedsville.

== Geology ==
Just below the ridge crest lies the contact between the older Ordovician Juniata Formation on the northwest slope, and the younger more erosion resistant Silurian Tuscarora Formation geologic layer forming the steeper southeast slope and the crest. The Bald Eagle Formation crops out on the Kishacoquillas Valley-facing slopes of Jacks Mountain, forming a steep topographic bench below the Juniata Formation. Below the Bald Eagle Formation, the uppermost sandstone layer of the underlying Reedsville Formation contains brachiopods and other marine fossils. The Reedsville forms the less steep lower slope that becomes shallower toward the base of the ridge. Across the Kishacoquillas Valley, on the opposite side of the Jacks Mountain anticline, the same rock layers are repeated in reverse order on the Stone Mountain ridge.
