= Saddler Creek =

River in Pennsylvania, United States

Coordinates: 40°27′1.27″N 77°55′25.0″W

Saddler Creek is a 9.0-mile-long (14.5 km) tributary of the Mill Creek in Mifflin County and Huntingdon County, Pennsylvania in the United States.

Saddler Creek is born just below the village of Allensville in Menno Township, flowing through the lower Kishacoquillas Valley. The stream passes through Airydale in Brady Township and joins Mill Creek at Fousetown upstream of Mill Creek's confluence with the Juniata River at the borough of Mill Creek, Pennsylvania.

The stream is locally known as Saddler's Creek and Saddler's Run.

== See also ==
- List of Pennsylvania rivers
