= Honey Creek (Pennsylvania) =

River in the United States of America

Coordinates: 40°39′42″N 77°35′45″W

Honey Creek is a 20.3-mile-long (32.7 km) tributary of Kishacoquillas Creek that is located in Mifflin County, Pennsylvania in the United States.

== Geography ==
Honey Creek drains the northeast end of the Kishacoquillas Valley. Treaster Run joins just downstream of the community of Locke Mills. Sections of the creek bed are composed of porous limestone, allowing water to enter and flow through Alexander Caverns and picking up the tributary Laurel Creek while underground, near the community of Shrader. During low flow, on the surface the creek appears to disappear, while continuing to flow through the caverns. The creek joins Kishacoquillas Creek at Reedsville, approximately 6.9 miles (11.1 km) upstream of the Juniata River.

Mammoth Spring, the third largest spring in Pennsylvania, flows at an average of 14,000 gallons per minute through an opening in above ground limestone is located on Honey Creek near Alexander Caverns. Alexander Caverns was used as a show cave from 1926 to 1959. An artificial opening was made to allow tours, boat rides and Cathedral room.

== Tributaries ==
- Treaster Run

== See also ==
- List of rivers of Pennsylvania
