= Snake Spring Township, Pennsylvania =

Township in Pennsylvania, US

Coordinates: 39°58′42″N 78°24′42″W

- Township
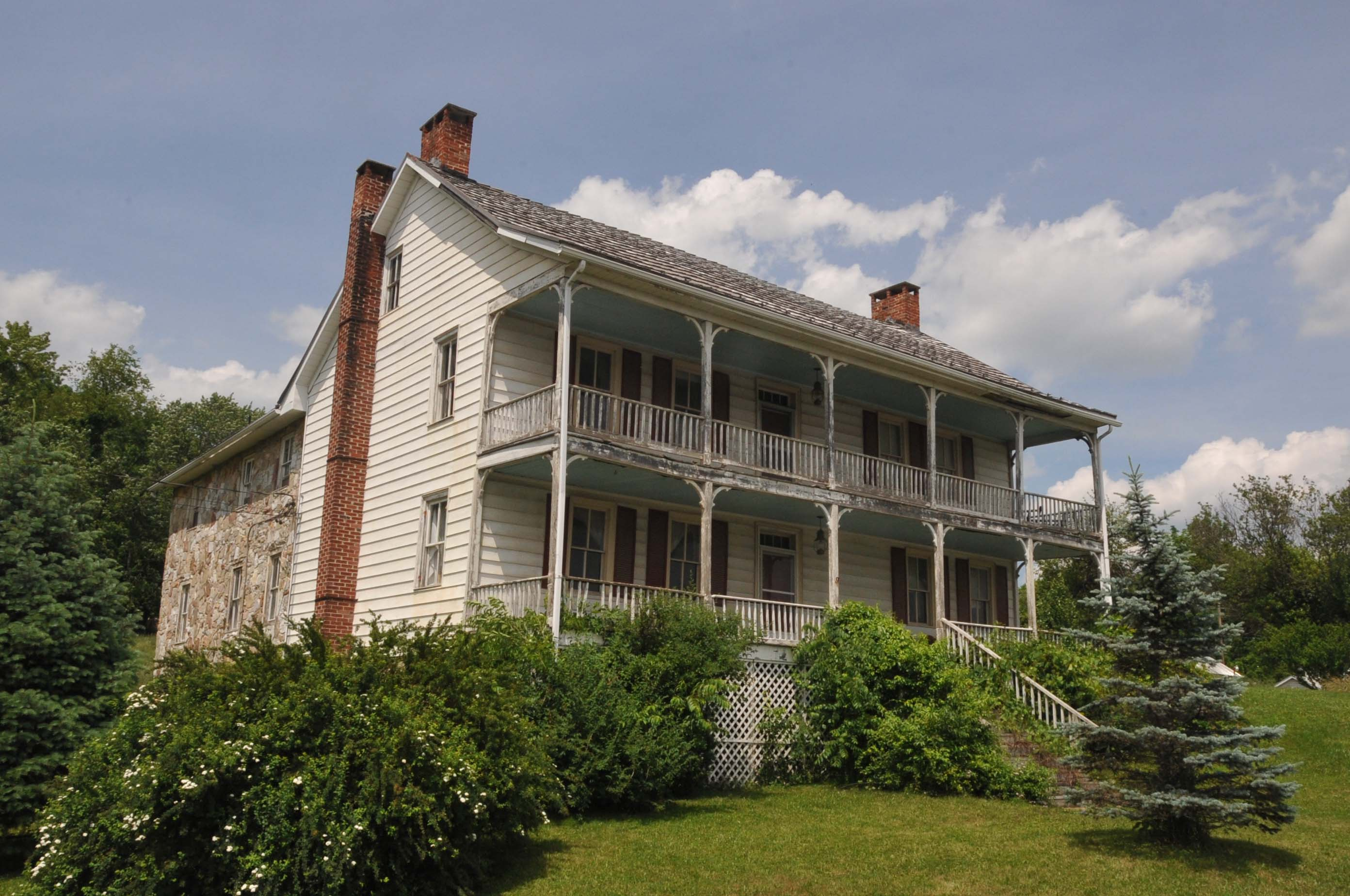
- Defibaugh Tavern

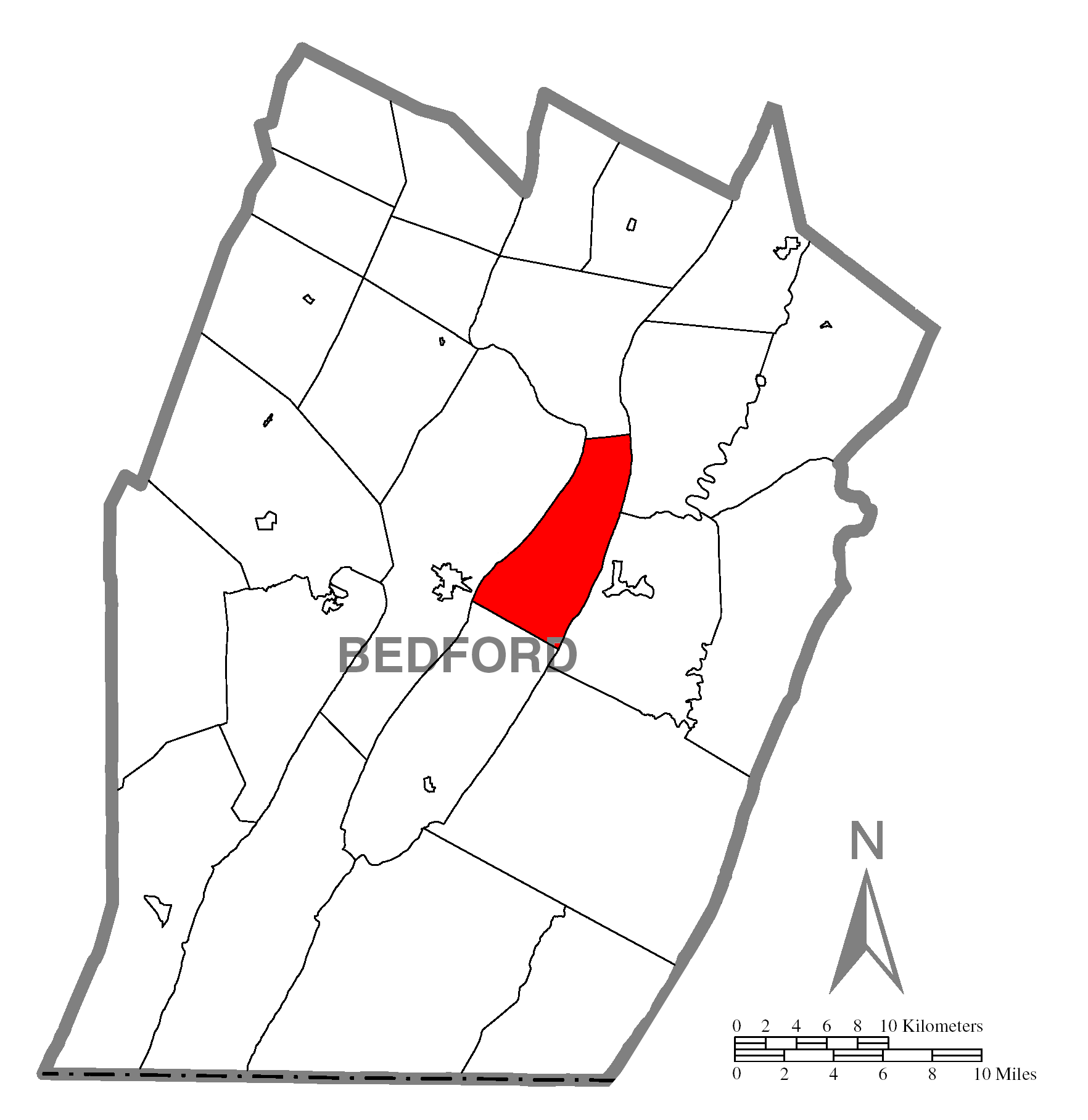
- Map of Bedford County, Pennsylvania highlighting Snake Spring Township

- Map of Bedford County, Pennsylvania
- Country: United States
- State: Pennsylvania
- County: Bedford
- Settled: 1763
- Incorporated: 1857

Area
  - Total: 26.26 sq mi (68.02 km^{2})
  - Land: 26.07 sq mi (67.53 km^{2})
  - Water: 0.19 sq mi (0.49 km^{2})

Population (2020)
  - Total: 1,770 ▲
  - Estimate (2023): 1,765
  - Density: 67/sq mi (25.8/km^{2})
- Time zone: UTC-5 (Eastern (EST))
  - Summer (DST): UTC-4 (EDT)
- Area code: 814
- FIPS code: 42-009-71544

Snake Spring Township is a township in Bedford County, Pennsylvania, United States. The population was 1,770 at the 2020 census.

== History ==
The Defibaugh Tavern, Bridge in Snake Spring Township, and Juniata Woolen Mill and Newry Manor are listed on the National Register of Historic Places.

== Geography ==
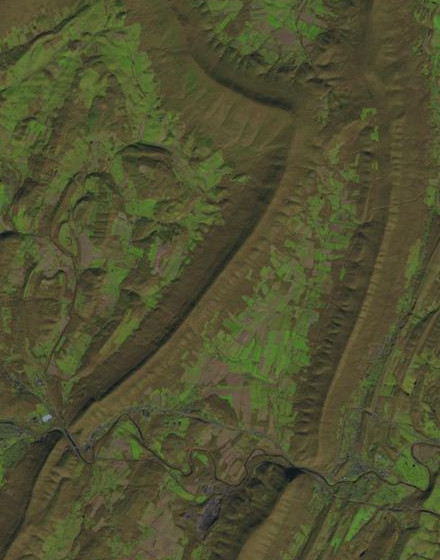
2016 Landsat image of Snake Spring valley

Snake Spring Township is located in east-central Bedford County, between the boroughs of Bedford (the county seat) and Everett. The townships borders follow mountain ridges on three sides: Tussey Mountain on the east, Evitts Mountain on the west, and a lower ridge connecting the two in the north. The Raystown Branch of the Juniata River flows west to east through the southern part of the township, cutting water gaps through Evitts Mountain (at The Narrows) and Tussey Mountain (at Mount Dallas). The Pennsylvania Turnpike (I-70 and I-76) and the older Lincoln Highway (US-30) follow the river and pass through the water gaps.

According to the United States Census Bureau, the township has a total area of 26.3 square miles (68.0 km^{2}), of which 26.1 square miles (67.5 km^{2}) is land and 0.19 square miles (0.5 km^{2}), or 0.71%, is water.

=== Adjacent municipalities ===
- Bedford Township (west)
- South Woodbury Township (north)
- Hopewell Township (northeast)
- West Providence Township (east)
- Colerain Township (south)

== Geology ==
Snake Spring valley is an anticlinal valley, with Evitts Mountain and Tussey Mountain forming the limbs. The Silurian Tuscarora Formation, a hard sandstone, outcrops at the crests of the ridges and is stratigraphically higher and thus younger than the rest of the bedrock in the valley. The low knobs or "benches" on the northwest side of Tussey Mountain and the southeast side of Evitts Mountain are formed by the Ordovician Bald Eagle Formation, another sandstone, that is stratigraphically below the Tuscarora. The two mountains nearly converge at the north end of the township. The rock formations in the valley range from Ordovician shales and limestones to the Cambrian Warrior Formation, another sandstone. The limestones can form sinkholes.

== Recreation ==
Portions of the Pennsylvania State Game Lands Number 73, Number 97, and Number 108 are located in the township.

== Demographics ==
Historical population
Census	Pop.	Note	%±
2010	1,639		—
2020	1,770		8.0%
2023 (est.)	1,765		−0.3%
U.S. Decennial Census

As of the census of 2000, there were 1,482 people, 552 households, and 432 families residing in the township. The population density was 57.5 inhabitants per square mile (22.2/km^{2}). There were 652 housing units at an average density of 25.3 units per square mile (9.8 units/km^{2}). The racial makeup of the township was 98.11% White, 0.20% African American, 0.20% Native American, 0.54% Asian, 0.40% from other races, and 0.54% from two or more races. Hispanic or Latino of any race were 0.20% of the population.

There were 552 households, out of which 28.8% had children under the age of 18 living with them, 70.5% were married couples living together, 5.6% had a female householder with no husband present, and 21.7% were non-families. 18.7% of all households were made up of individuals, and 9.4% had someone living alone who was 65 years of age or older. The average household size was 2.49 and the average family size was 2.82.

In the township the population was spread out, with 18.9% under the age of 18, 5.8% from 18 to 24, 25.7% from 25 to 44, 26.0% from 45 to 64, and 23.6% who were 65 years of age or older. The median age was 45 years. For every 100 females there were 93.2 males. For every 100 females age 18 and over, there were 92.3 males.

The median income for a household in the township was $36,389, and the median income for a family was $38,289. Males had a median income of $32,159 versus $17,772 for females. The per capita income for the township was $16,801. About 4.4% of families and 6.3% of the population were below the poverty line, including 6.3% of those under age 18 and 6.5% of those age 65 or over.
