= The Narrows (Pennsylvania) =

Water gap in Pennsylvania

Coordinates: 40°00′54″N 78°28′22″W

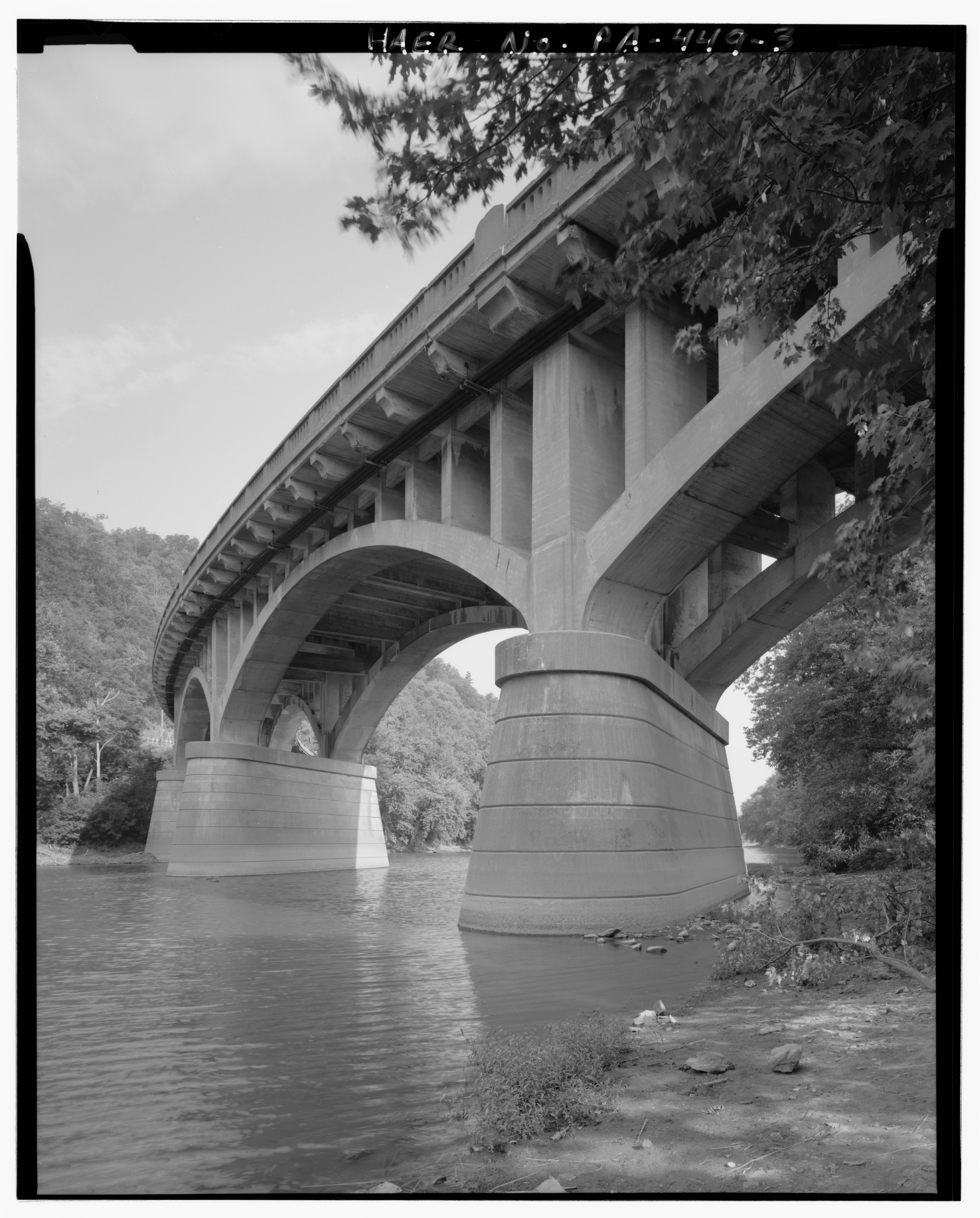
The Narrows Bridge in 1997

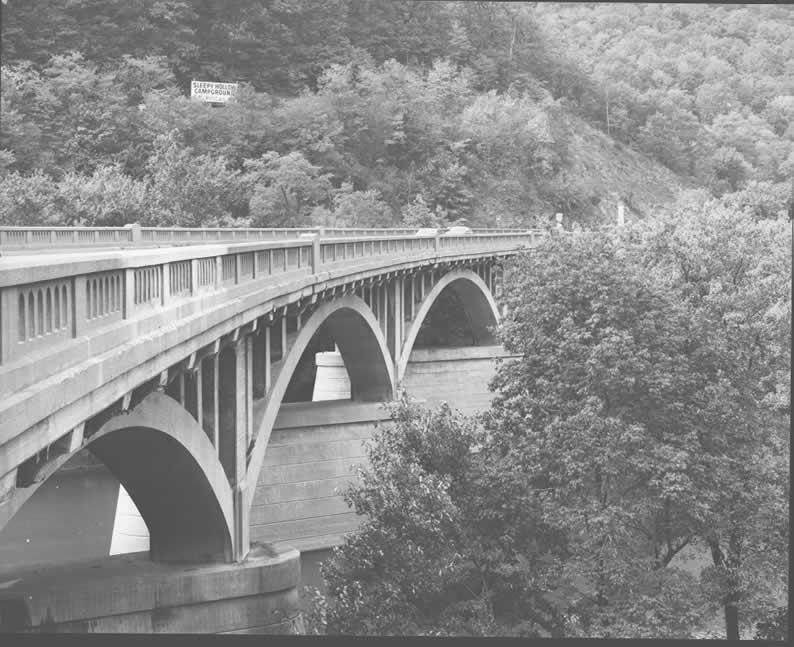
Another view looking west in 1982

The Narrows is a water gap where the Raystown Branch of the Juniata River passes through Evitts Mountain in Bedford County, Pennsylvania. Both U.S. Route 30 (part of the Lincoln Highway) and the Pennsylvania Turnpike pass through the gap. It is located in the townships of Snake Spring and Bedford.

== Geology ==
A major group of east–west trending faults and the erosional force of the Raystown Branch of the Juniata River are responsible for the existence of this water gap. Four formations are exposed on the north side of the gap (along a roadcut for the Turnpike): The Tuscarora, the Juniata, the Bald Eagle, and the Reedsville Formation. The Tuscarora is exposed on the south side of the gap along Rt. 30.

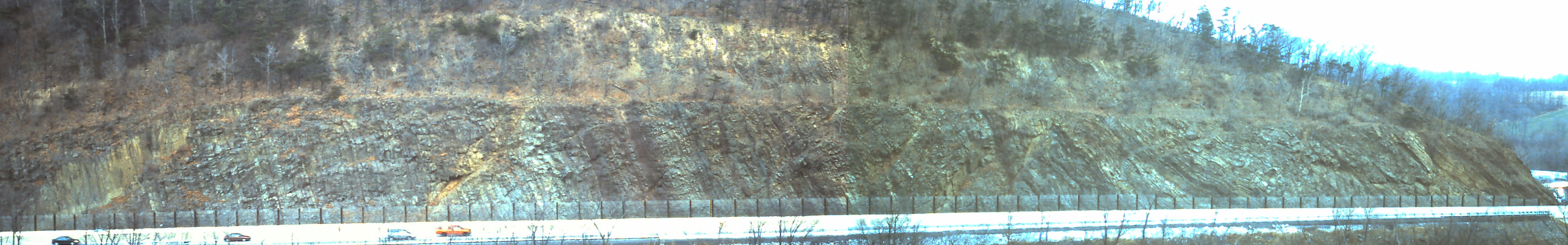
A panorama of a portion of the Narrows roadcut for the Pennsylvania Turnpike. Stratigraphic up is to the left, and thus the beds are overturned. The beds are highly folded and faulted at right. February 2001.
