= Kishacoquillas Valley =

Valley in Pennsylvania, United States

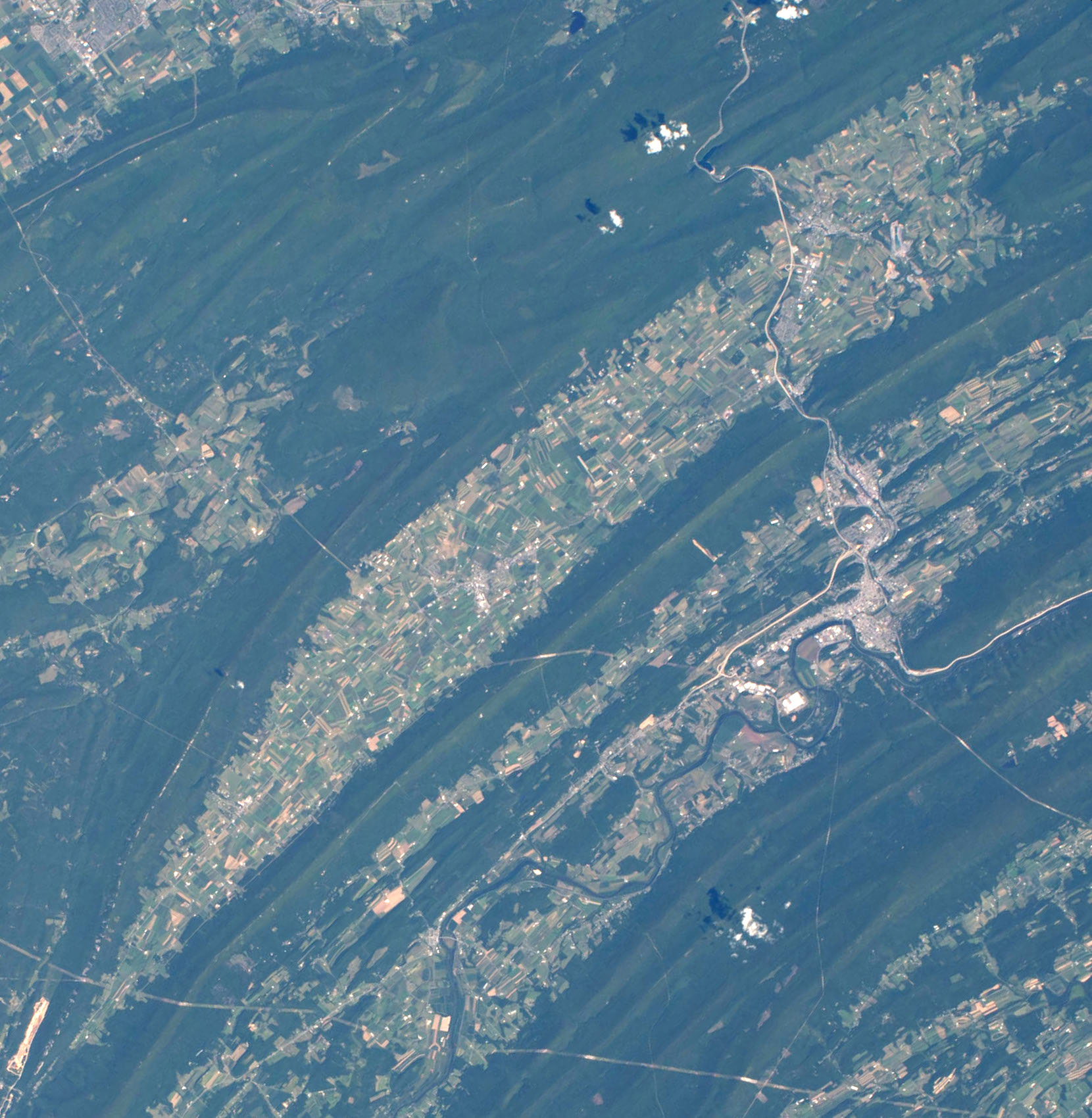
- Kishacoquillas Valley from the ISS

- Location within Pennsylvania Location within the United States
- Length: 27 miles (43 km) approx. northeast-southwest
- Width: 2.5 miles (4.0 km) approx.

Geography
- Location: Mifflin County, Pennsylvania
- Population centers: Allensville, Belleville, Reedsville and Milroy
- Borders on: Stone Mountain (west/north); Jacks Mountain (east/south)
- Coordinates: 40°37′N 77°43′W
- Interactive map of Kishacoquillas Valley

The Kishacoquillas Valley, known locally as both Kish Valley and Big Valley, is an enclosed anticlinal valley in the Ridge-and-valley Appalachians of Central Pennsylvania, and is located in Mifflin and Huntingdon counties.

== History ==
John Armstrong named the Valley in 1759 after a friendly Shawnee chief. This Shawnee name translates to "The snakes are already in their dens."

Joseph Yoder portrayed the late nineteenth-century Valley in his semi-autobiographical novel, Rosanna of the Amish (1940).

== Amish and Mennonites ==
The Amish settlement in the Kishacoquillas Valley was founded in 1791. It is the third-oldest Amish settlement still in existence. In 2013 there were 26 Amish church districts, indicating an estimated Amish population of more than 3,000 people.

Twelve Amish and Mennonite groups live in the valley, "one of the most diverse expressions of Anabaptist-Mennonite culture anywhere in North America," according to John A. Hostetler, a renowned scholar of the Amish. The Kishacoquillas Valley is home to the Nebraska Amish, the most conservative Amish group, the Byler Amish and the Renno Amish.

Kishacoquillas Valley has many similarities to the Lancaster region in the state. Accents identical to those heard in the Lancaster region are frequently heard in the valley, and some of the population continue to speak a dialect of the German language known as Pennsylvania Dutch (from Deutsch, meaning German).

== Geography ==
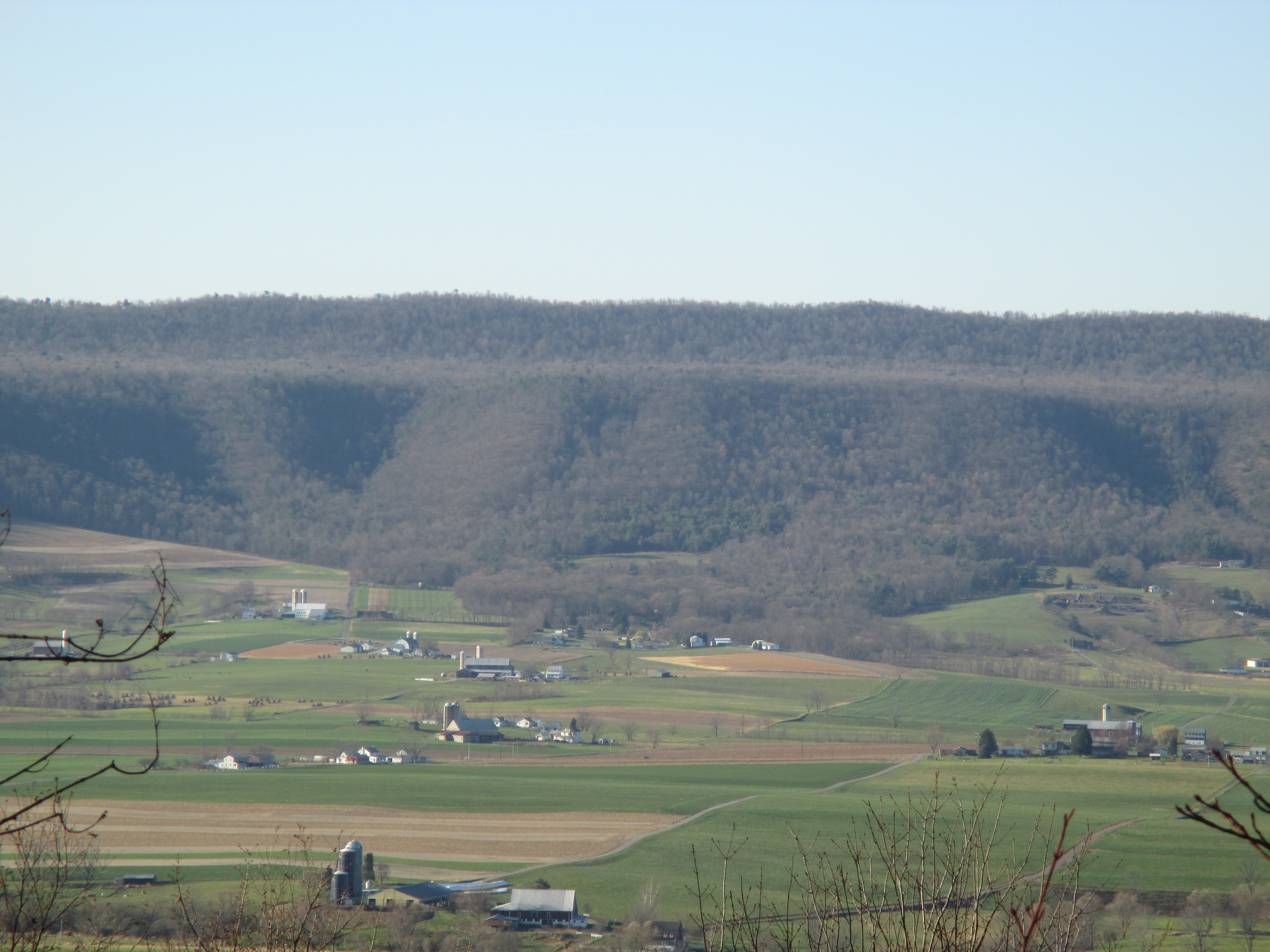
Kishacoquillas Valley looking north from Jacks Mountain, near the village of Belleville

The valley lies between Stone Mountain ridge to the north and Jacks Mountain ridge to the south. It drains via the Kishacoquillas Creek through the Mann Narrows water gap in Jacks Mountain to the Juniata River.

U.S. Route 322 follows the creek through the gap, and is the main travel route across the valley, running east and west between Harrisburg and State College.

The Mifflin County Airport is also located in the valley.

== Principal towns ==
- Belleville
- Milroy
- Reedsville
- Barrville
- Allensville
- Airydale
