= Juniata Woolen Mill and Newry Manor =

- U.S. National Register of Historic Places
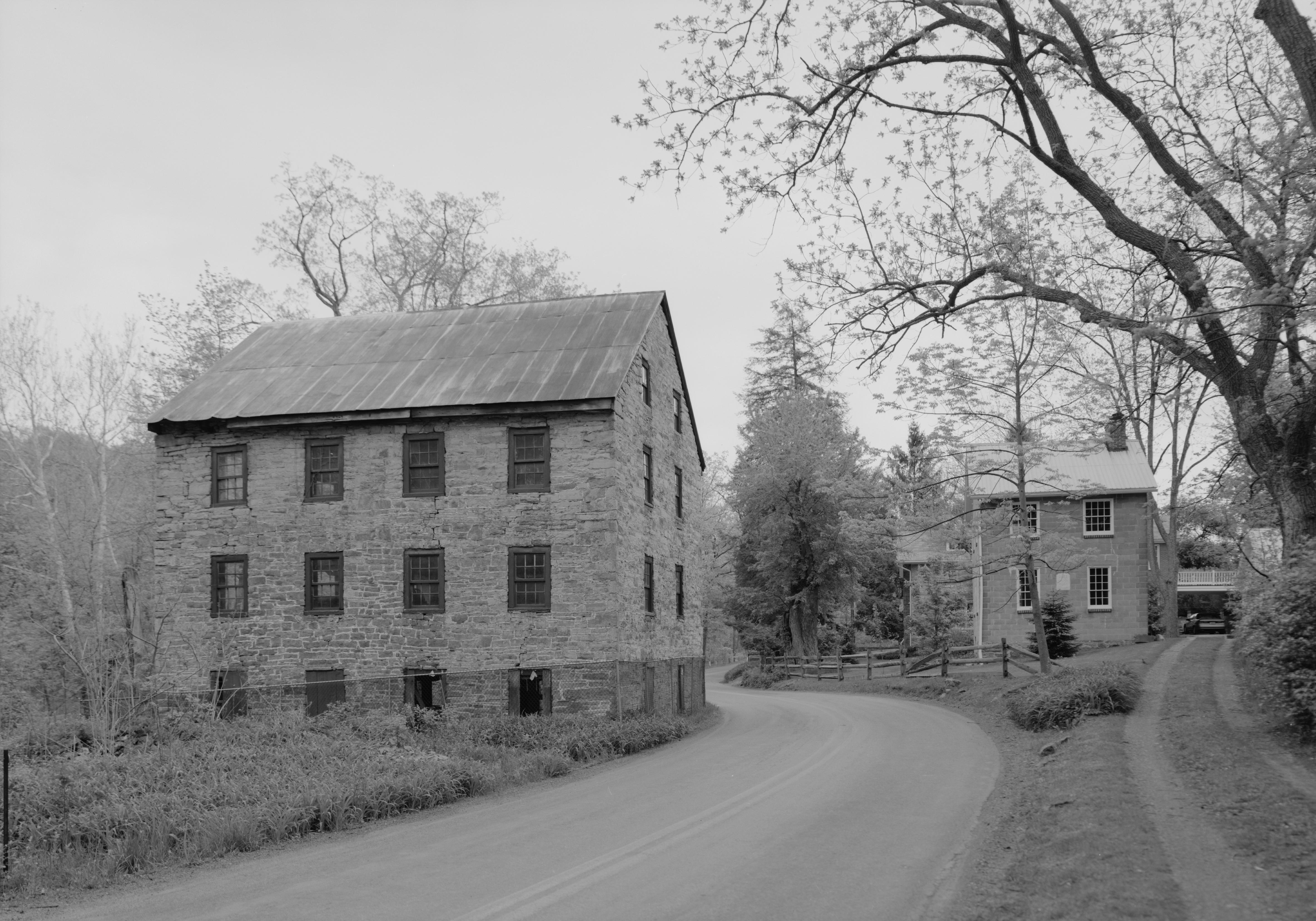
- Juniata Woolen Mill and Newry Manor, 1994

- Location within Pennsylvania Location within the United States
- Location: West of Everett on Lutzville Road, Snake Spring Township, Pennsylvania
- Coordinates: 40°00′54″N 78°25′50″W
- Area: 5.4 acres (2.2 ha)
- Built: 1803, 1805, 1858
- NRHP reference No.: 83002216
- Added to NRHP: March 31, 1983

The Juniata Woolen Mill and Newry Manor, also known as the Lutz Mansion and Woolen Mill, Lux Vista, Lutz Mill, and Lutz Factory, is an historic woolen mill building and manor house located in Snake Spring Township in Bedford County, Pennsylvania, United States.

It was listed on the National Register of Historic Places in 1983.

== History and architectural features ==
The site includes a small German colonial manor house that dates to 1803 with a large brick addition dating to 1858 and an attached log house, and a stone woolen mill that date to 1805. The original 1803 manor house is a two-and-one-half-story, three-bay wide building. Attached to it is the two-and-one-half-story, late-federal-style, brick addition, with the early nineteenth century, two-story log house attached to it. The log house was restored in 1950. The woolen mill is two-and-one-half stories with four working levels. The mill was in operation for more than a century, beginning in 1808.

It was listed on the National Register of Historic Places in 1983.
