= Mill Creek (Juniata River tributary) =

River in Pennsylvania, United States

Coordinates: 40°26′12″N 77°56′03″W

Mill Creek is a 9.3-mile-long (15.0 km) tributary of the Juniata River in Huntingdon County, Pennsylvania in the United States. The waters of Mill Creek once powered watermills, hence the name.

Mill Creek joins the Juniata at the borough of Mill Creek.

== Tributaries ==
- Saddler Creek

== See also ==
- List of Pennsylvania rivers
