= Defibaugh Tavern =

- U.S. National Register of Historic Places
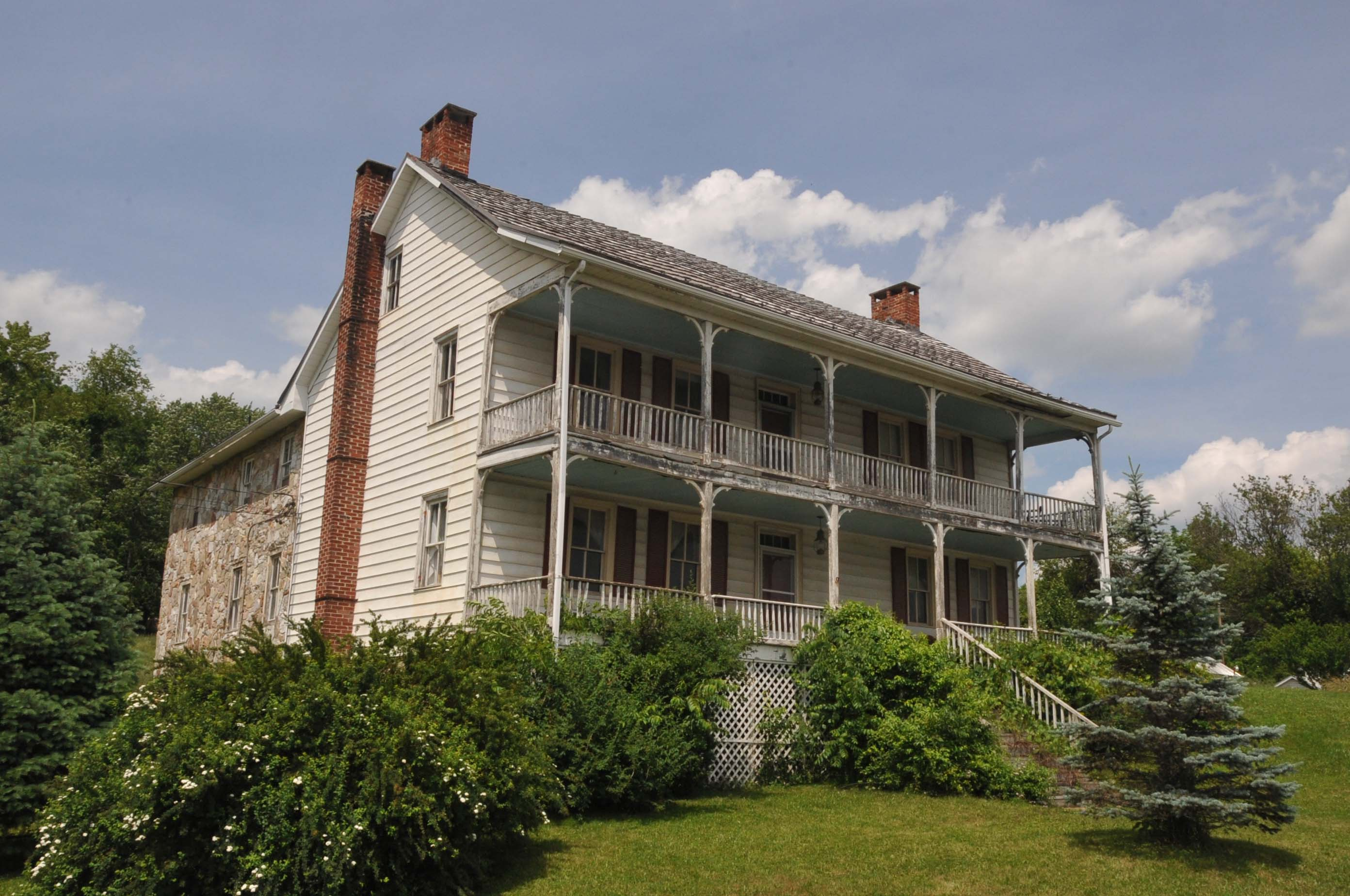

- Location within Pennsylvania Location within the United States
- Location: Northern side of U.S. Route 30, east of Bedford, Snake Spring Township, Pennsylvania
- Coordinates: 40°1′34″N 78°27′10″W
- Area: 1.5 acres (0.61 ha)
- Built: 1794
- Architectural style: Vernacular tavern house
- MPS: Whiskey Rebellion Resources in Southwestern Pennsylvania MPS
- NRHP reference No.: 92001498
- Added to NRHP: November 12, 1992

Defibaugh Tavern, also known as Willow Grove Tavern, is a historic tavern building located at Snake Spring Township in Bedford County, Pennsylvania. It was built about 1785, and is a 2 1/2-story, log-and-frame building with a double stacked porch. The original section was built of logs and it was expanded in the early 19th century. It has a 2 1/2-story frame kitchen ell. Also on the property is a small log barn dated to the 18th century.

It was listed on the National Register of Historic Places in 1992.
