= Mifflin County Airport =

- IATA: RED; ICAO: KRVL; FAA LID: RVL

Summary
- Airport type: Public
- Owner: Mifflin County Airport Authority
- Serves: Lewistown
- Location: Reedsville, Pennsylvania
- Elevation AMSL: 819 ft (250 m)
- Coordinates: 40°40′39″N 077°37′37″W
- Website: MifflinCountyAirport.com

Map
- Location within Pennsylvania Location within the United States

Runways
Direction	Length		Surface
Direction	ft	m	Surface
6/24	5,001	1,524	Asphalt

Statistics (2009)
- Aircraft operations: 19,400
- Based aircraft: 33
- Source: Federal Aviation Administration

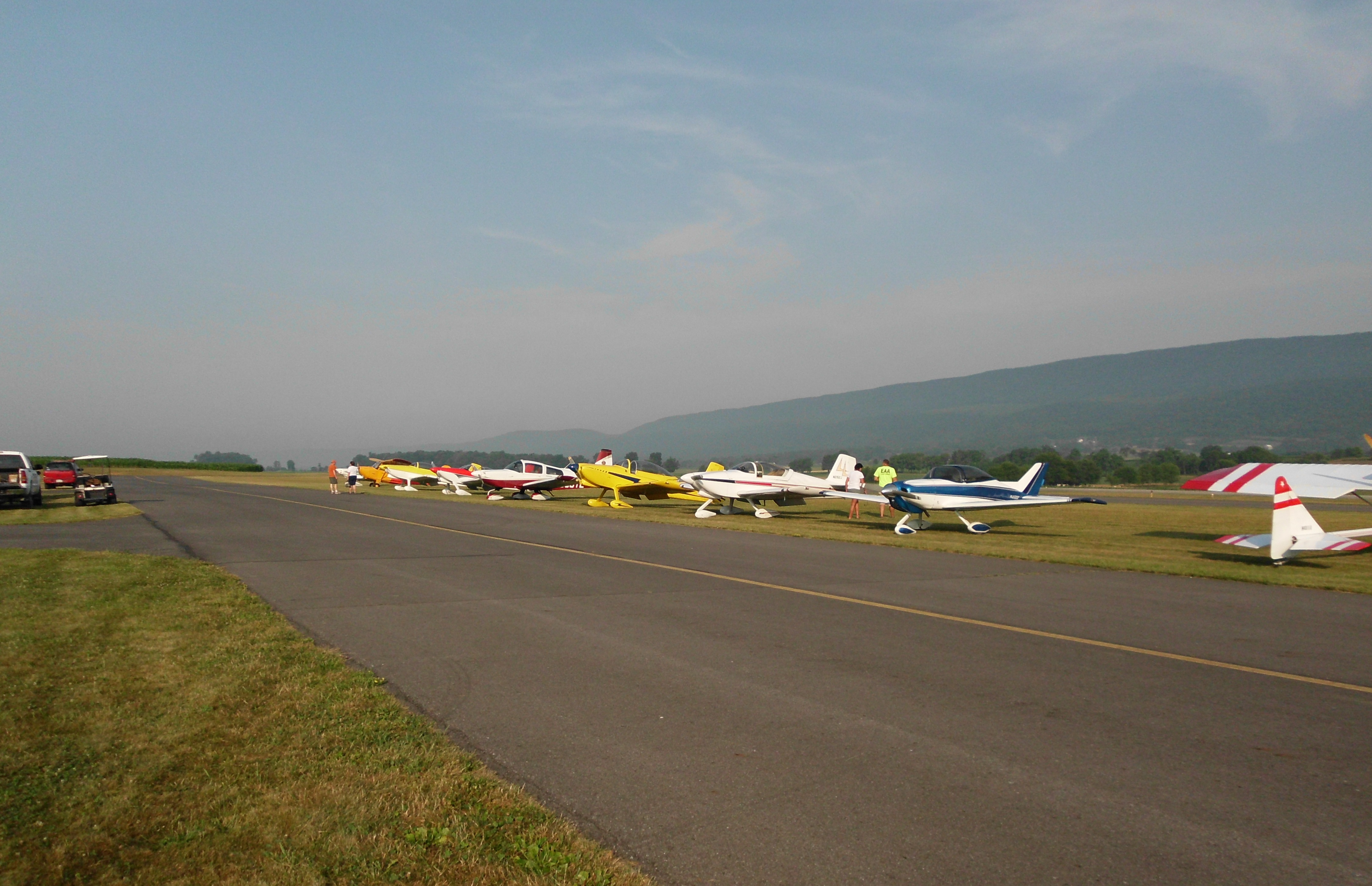
Aircraft participating in a fly-in at Mifflin County Airport

Mifflin County Airport (IATA: RED, ICAO: KRVL, FAA LID: RVL) is a public airport in Mifflin County, Pennsylvania. It is in Reedsville, five miles northwest of Lewistown. It is owned by the Mifflin County Airport Authority. The FAA's National Plan of Integrated Airport Systems for 2009-2013 called it a general aviation airport.

Many U.S. airports use the same three-letter location identifier for the FAA and IATA, but this airport is RVL to the FAA and RED to the IATA.

== Facilities ==
The airport covers 125 acres (51 ha) at an elevation of 819 feet (250 m). Its one runway, 6/24, is 5,001 by 75 feet (1,524 x 23 m) asphalt.

In the year ending February 20, 2009 the airport had 19,400 aircraft operations, average 53 per day: 97% general aviation and 3% air taxi. 33 aircraft were then based at the airport: 85% single-engine, 6% multi-engine, 3% jet and 6% glider.

There is an AWOS-3 on the field.

== Soaring contests ==
Mifflin County Airport is a popular site for gliding competitions and has hosted ten national championships and four regional championships since 1990.

== See also ==
- List of airports in Pennsylvania
