= Bridge in Snake Spring Township =

- U.S. National Register of Historic Places
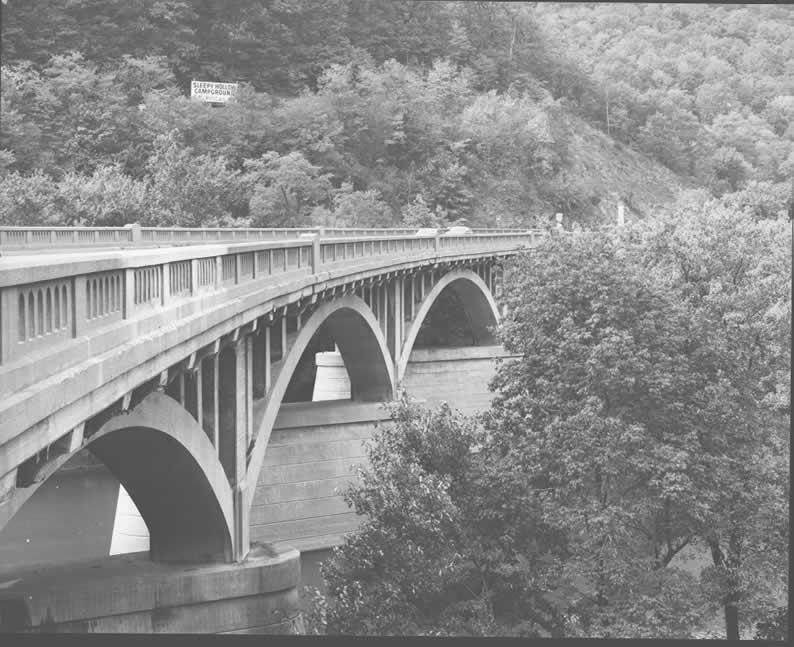
- Bridge in Snake Spring Township, 1982

- Location within Pennsylvania Location within the United States
- Location: US 30 (Lincoln Highway) over Raystown Branch Juniata River, Snake Spring Township, Pennsylvania
- Coordinates: 40°0′52″N 78°28′19″W
- Area: less than one acre
- Built: 1934
- Built by: Pittsburg Construction Co.
- Architectural style: Skewed open-spandrel arch
- MPS: Highway Bridges Owned by the Commonwealth of Pennsylvania, Department of Transportation TR
- NRHP reference No.: 88000793
- Added to NRHP: June 22, 1988

Bridge in Snake Spring Township, also known as the Narrows Bridge, is a historic concrete arch bridge located at The Narrows in Snake Spring Township in Bedford County, Pennsylvania. It was built in 1934, and is a 580-foot-long (180 m), open spandrel concrete arch bridge with five arches. The roadway is skewed and carries US 30, the Lincoln Highway, over the Raystown Branch Juniata River.

It was listed on the National Register of Historic Places in 1988.

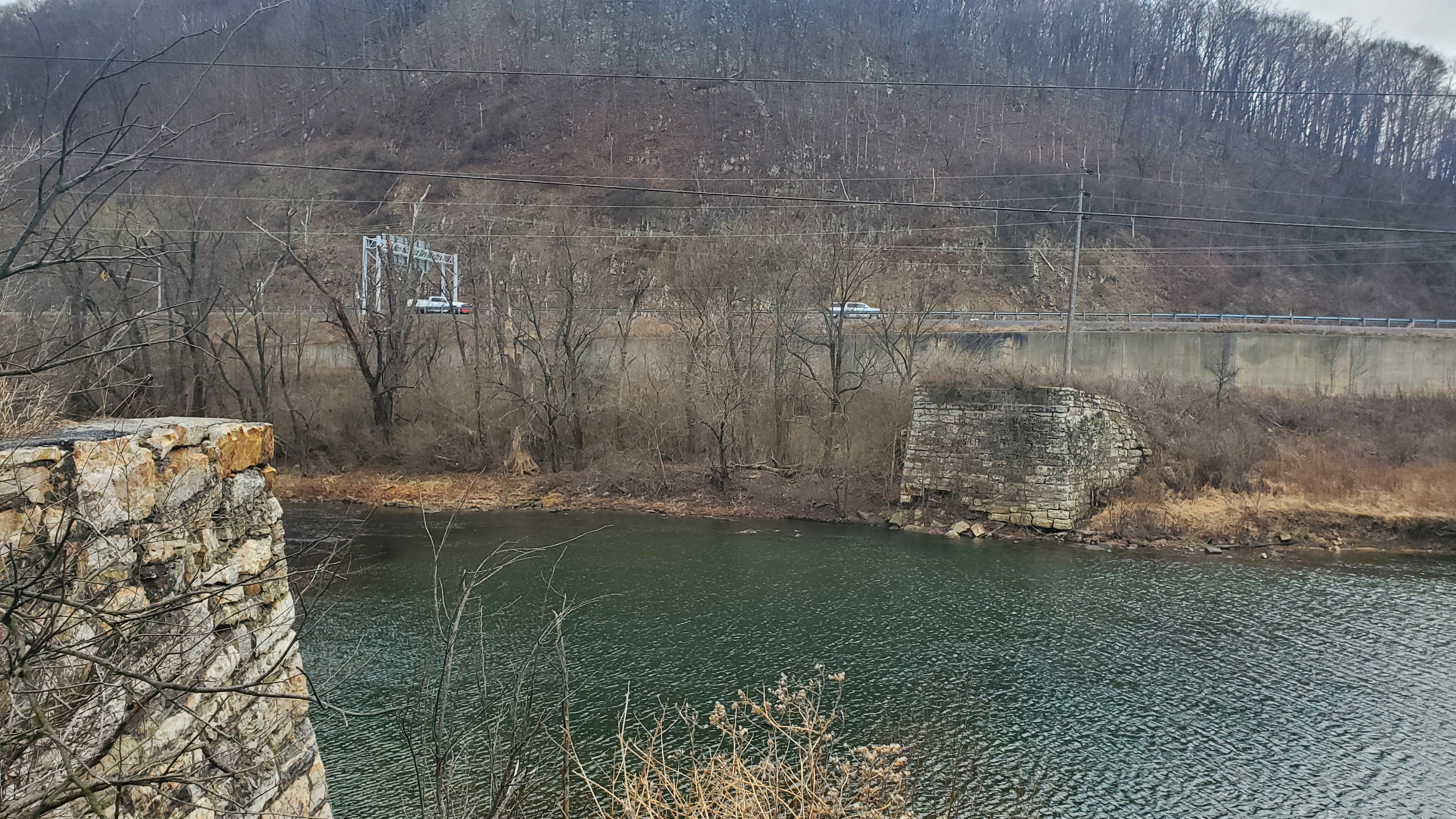
Ruins of the old Lincoln Highway bridge located about 1500 feet upriver from the Narrows Bridge.

== See also ==
- List of bridges documented by the Historic American Engineering Record in Pennsylvania
