= Treaster Run =

Coordinates: 40°42′37″N 77°31′44″W

Treaster Run is a 14.0-mile-long (22.5 km) tributary of Honey Creek in Mifflin County, Pennsylvania in the United States.

Treaster Run joins Honey Creek just downstream of the community of Locke Mills.

== See also ==
- List of rivers of Pennsylvania

== Tributaries ==
- Havice Creek
