= Kishacoquillas Creek =

River in Pennsylvania, US

Coordinates: 40°35′39″N 77°34′30″W

Kishacoquillas Creek (pronounced Kish-e-kō-kwil´-lis) is a 24.0-mile-long (38.6 km) tributary of the Juniata River in Mifflin County, Pennsylvania in the United States.

Kishacoquillas Creek (named for a friendly Native American inhabitant) drains the Kishacoquillas Valley, running along the foot of the Jacks Mountain ridge where it intersects with Honey Creek before passing through the Mann Narrows water gap and joins the Juniata River at the borough of Lewistown.

== Tributaries ==
- Honey Creek

== See also ==
- List of rivers of Pennsylvania
