= Menno Township, Pennsylvania =

Township in Pennsylvania, US

Coordinates: 40°34′00″N 77°46′59″W

- Township
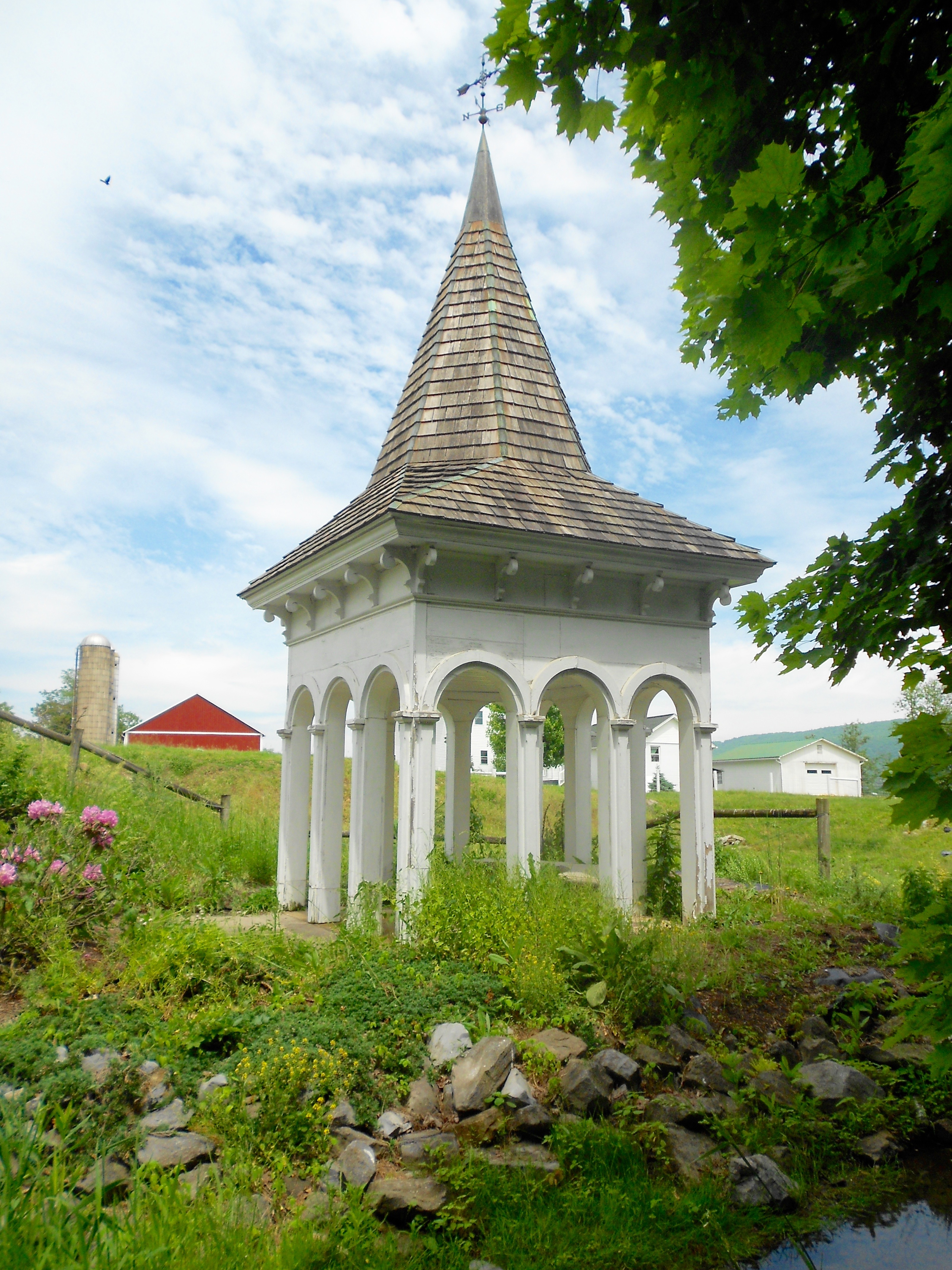
- Gazebo in Allensville

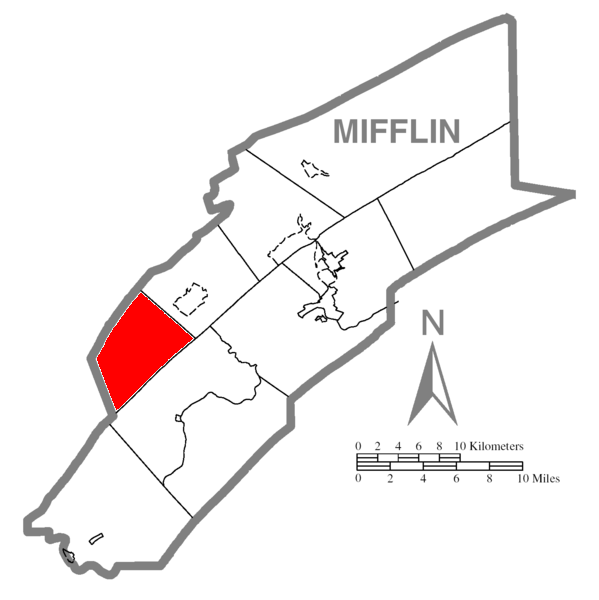
- Map of Mifflin County, Pennsylvania highlighting Menno Township

- Map of Mifflin County, Pennsylvania
- Country: United States
- State: Pennsylvania
- County: Mifflin
- Settled: 1754
- Incorporated: 1837

Government
  - Type: Board of Supervisors
  - Supervisor: Torrey Hildebrand
  - Supervisor: Harry Clever
  - Supervisor: Micah Anderson

Area
  - Total: 23.70 sq mi (61.38 km^{2})
  - Land: 23.69 sq mi (61.35 km^{2})
  - Water: 0.012 sq mi (0.03 km^{2})

Population (2020)
  - Total: 1,973 ▲
  - Estimate (2022): 1,972
  - Density: 81.0/sq mi (31.29/km^{2})
- Time zone: UTC-5 (Eastern (EST))
  - Summer (DST): UTC-4 (EDT)
- Zip code: 17002
- Area code: 717
- FIPS code: 42-087-48664
- Website: Menno Township
- Local phone exchange: 483

Menno Township is a township in Mifflin County, Pennsylvania, United States. The population was 1,973 at the time of the 2020 census.

== History ==
The township was named for Menno Simons, an early Mennonite leader. Mennonites and Amish were among the early settlers of the area, and members of these faiths continue to form a part of the area's population.

== Geography ==
According to the United States Census Bureau, the township has a total area of 23.8 square miles (61.7 km^{2}), all land. It contains the census-designated place of Allensville.

== Demographics ==
Historical population
Census	Pop.	Note	%±
2010	1,883		—
2020	1,973		4.8%
2022 (est.)	1,972		−0.1%
U.S. Decennial Census

As of the census of 2000, there were 1,763 people, 484 households, and 408 families residing in the township.

The population density was 74.0 inhabitants per square mile (28.6/km^{2}). There were 551 housing units at an average density of 23.1/sq mi (8.9/km^{2}).

The racial makeup of the township was 97.50% White, 1.64% African American, 0.06% Asian, 0.17% from other races, and 0.62% from two or more races. Hispanic or Latino of any race were 0.40% of the population.

There were 484 households, out of which 45.9% had children under the age of eighteen living with them; 77.1% were married couples living together, 4.3% had a female householder with no husband present, and 15.5% were non-families. 14.9% of all households were made up of individuals, and 7.9% had someone living alone who was sixty-five years of age or older.

The average household size was 3.64 and the average family size was 4.07.

In the township the population was spread out, with 40.0% under the age of eighteen, 10.0% from eighteen to twenty-four, 22.5% from twenty-five to forty-four, 16.6% from forty-five to sixty-four, and 10.9% who were sixty-five years of age or older. The median age was twenty-five years.

For every one hundred females, there were 95.2 males. For every one hundred females who were aged eighteen and over, there were 95.2 males.

The median income for a household in the township was $31,453, and the median income for a family was $34,141. Males had a median income of $28,125 compared with that of $17,500 for females.

The per capita income for the township was $10,303.

Roughly 17.6% of families and 23.6% of the population were living below the poverty line, including 31.1% of those who were under the age of eighteen and 17.0% of those who were aged sixty-five or over.
