= Reedsville, Pennsylvania =

Unincorporated community in Pennsylvania, US

- Census-designated place
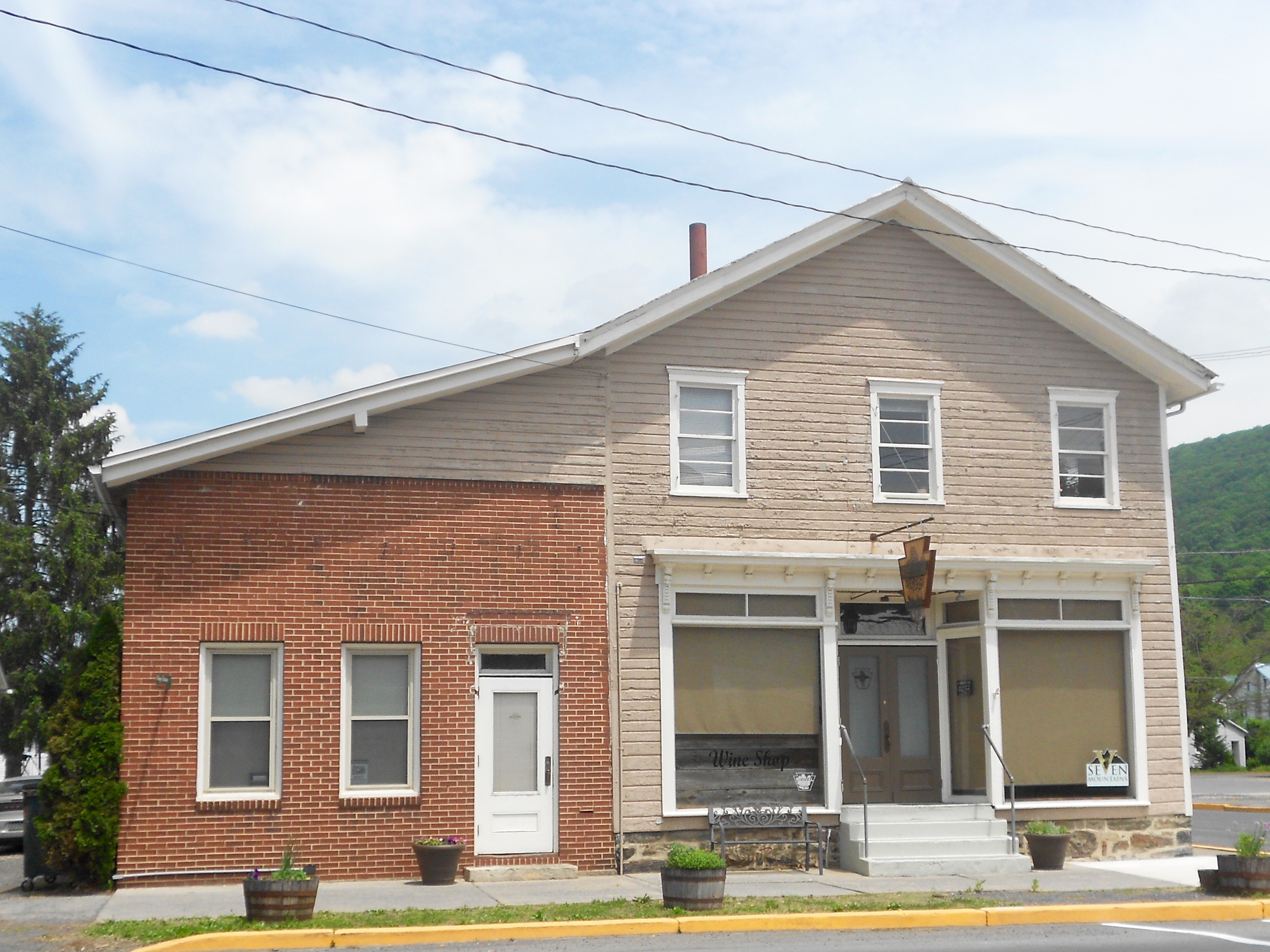

- Location within the U.S. state of Pennsylvania Reedsville (the United States)
- Coordinates: 40°39′45″N 77°35′45″W
- Country: United States
- State: Pennsylvania
- County: Mifflin

Area
  - Total: 0.68 sq mi (1.77 km^{2})
  - Land: 0.66 sq mi (1.72 km^{2})
  - Water: 0.023 sq mi (0.06 km^{2})
- Elevation: 592 ft (180 m)

Population (2020)
  - Total: 579
  - Density: 873.2/sq mi (337.13/km^{2})
- Time zone: UTC-5 (Eastern (EST))
  - Summer (DST): UTC-4 (EDT)
- FIPS code: 42-63976

Reedsville is a census-designated place (CDP) in the Kishacoquillas Valley of Mifflin County, Pennsylvania, United States. The population was 579 at the 2020 census. Reedsville has a high Amish population.

== General information ==
- ZIP code: 17084
- Area code: 717
- Local telephone exchange: 667

== Geography ==
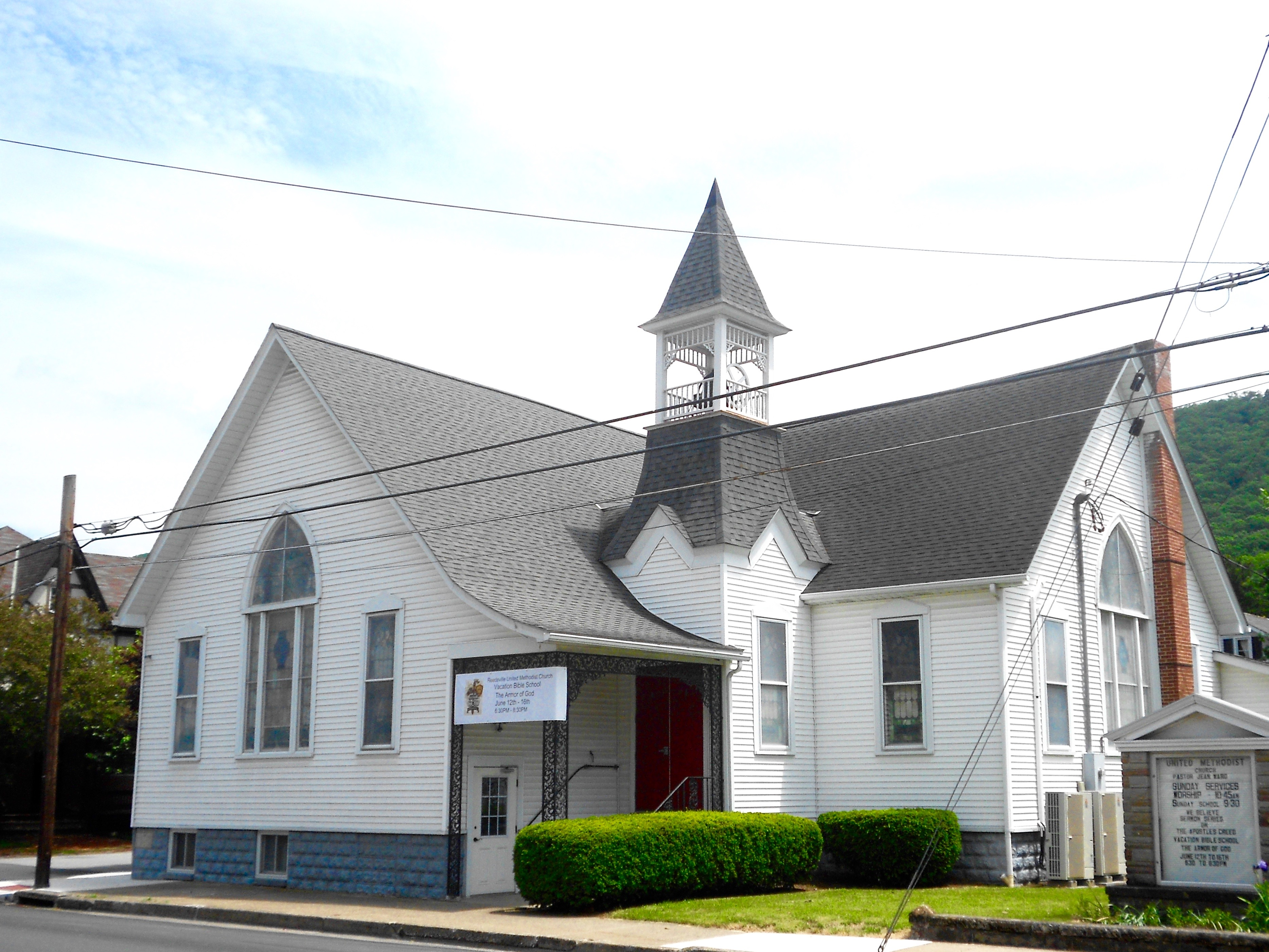
United Methodist Church

Reedsville is located north of the center of Mifflin County at 40°39′45″N 77°35′45″W (40.662470, -77.595962) in Brown Township. It lies along Kishacoquillas Creek at the north end of Mann Narrows, a water gap where the creek cuts through Jacks Mountain. Through the narrows it is 1.9 miles (3.1 km) to Yeagertown. U.S. Route 322 is a limited access highway that passes along the west side of Fairview and leads 5 miles (8 km) south to Lewistown and north and west 26 miles (42 km) to State College.

According to the United States Census Bureau, the CDP has a total area of 0.69 square miles (1.8 km^{2}), of which 0.023 square miles (0.06 km^{2}), or 3.22%, is water.

== Demographics ==
Historical population
Census	Pop.	Note	%±
2000	850		—
2010	641		−24.6%
2020	579		−9.7%
U.S. Decennial Census

As of the census of 2000, there were 850 people, 324 households, and 226 families residing in the CDP. The population density was 313.2 inhabitants per square mile (120.9/km^{2}). There were 346 housing units at an average density of 126.3 per square mile (48.8/km^{2}). The racial makeup of the CDP was 99.53% White 0.23% Asian, and 0.23% from two or more races.

There were 324 households, out of which 29.3% had children under the age of 18 living with them, 57.7% were married couples living together, 9.0% had a female householder with no husband present, and 30.2% were non-families. 24.1% of all households were made up of individuals, and 12.7% had someone living alone who was 65 years of age or older. The average household size was 2.47 and the average family size was 2.94.

In the CDP, the population was spread out, with 22.1% under the age of 18, 6.1% from 18 to 24, 28.2% from 25 to 44, 22.7% from 45 to 64, and 20.9% who were 65 years of age or older. The median age was 40 years. For every 100 females, there were 92.4 males. For every 100 females age 18 and over, there were 88.7 males.

The median income for a household in the CDP was $30,833, and the median income for a family was $32,583. Males had a median income of $25,481 versus $20,938 for females. The per capita income for the CDP was $13,591. About 4.4% of families and 5.0% of the population were below the poverty line, including none of those under age 18 and 10.1% of those age 65 or over.

== Geology ==
The Reedsville Formation is named after this town.

== Schools ==
Reedsville is part of the Mifflin County School District:

- Brown Township Elementary School (now closed)
- Indian Valley Elementary/Intermediate School (was formerly Indian Valley Middle School; before that it was Kishacoquillas High School)
