= Bald Eagle Formation =

- Stratigraphic range: Late Ordovician
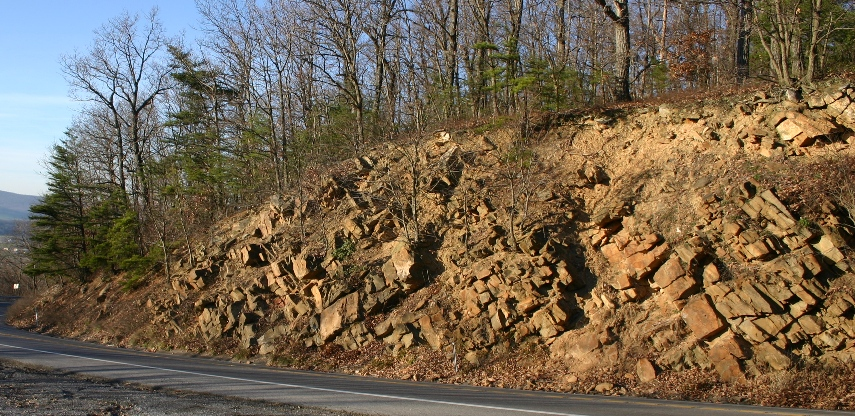
- Outcrop of Bald Eagle Formation, where Rt. 164 crosses Tussey Mountain, Blair County, Pennsylvania
- Type: sedimentary
- Underlies: Juniata Formation
- Overlies: Reedsville Formation
- Thickness: 275 +/-25 m

Lithology
- Primary: sandstone
- Other: conglomerate, shale

Location
- Region: Appalachian Mountains
- Extent: Pennsylvania, Maryland, West Virginia

Type section
- Named for: Bald Eagle Mountain, Pennsylvania
- Named by: A. W. Grabau

The Ordovician Bald Eagle Formation is a mapped bedrock unit in central Pennsylvania, USA. It is a ridge-forming unit in the Appalachian Mountains.

== Description ==
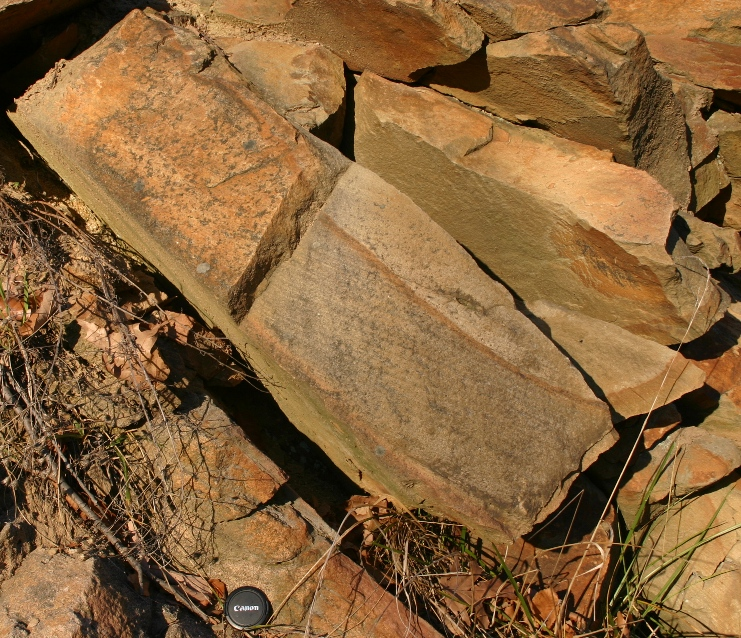
Close-up of outcrop of Bald Eagle Formation, where Rt. 164 crosses Tussey Mountain, Blair County, Pennsylvania. Note prominent crossbedding and lens cap for scale.

The Bald Eagle is defined as a gray to olive-gray and grayish-red, fine to coarse-grained crossbedded sandstone or greywacke. A conglomeratic member, called the Lost Run Member, exists in some locations.

=== Depositional environment ===
The depositional environment of the Bald Eagle has always been interpreted as mostly terrestrial or shallow marine deposits resulting in a molasse sequence produced by the Taconic orogeny.

=== Fossils ===
Very few fossils exist in the Bald Eagle Formation, and most of them are trace fossils. However, at the base of the formation is the Orthorynchula biostratigraphic marker bed, which contains abundant Orthorynchula brachiopods.

== Age ==
Relative age dating of the Bald Eagle places it in the Upper Ordovician period, being deposited between 488.3 and 443.7 (±10) million years ago. It rests conformably atop the Reedsville Formation and conformably below the Juniata Formation.

== Economic Uses ==
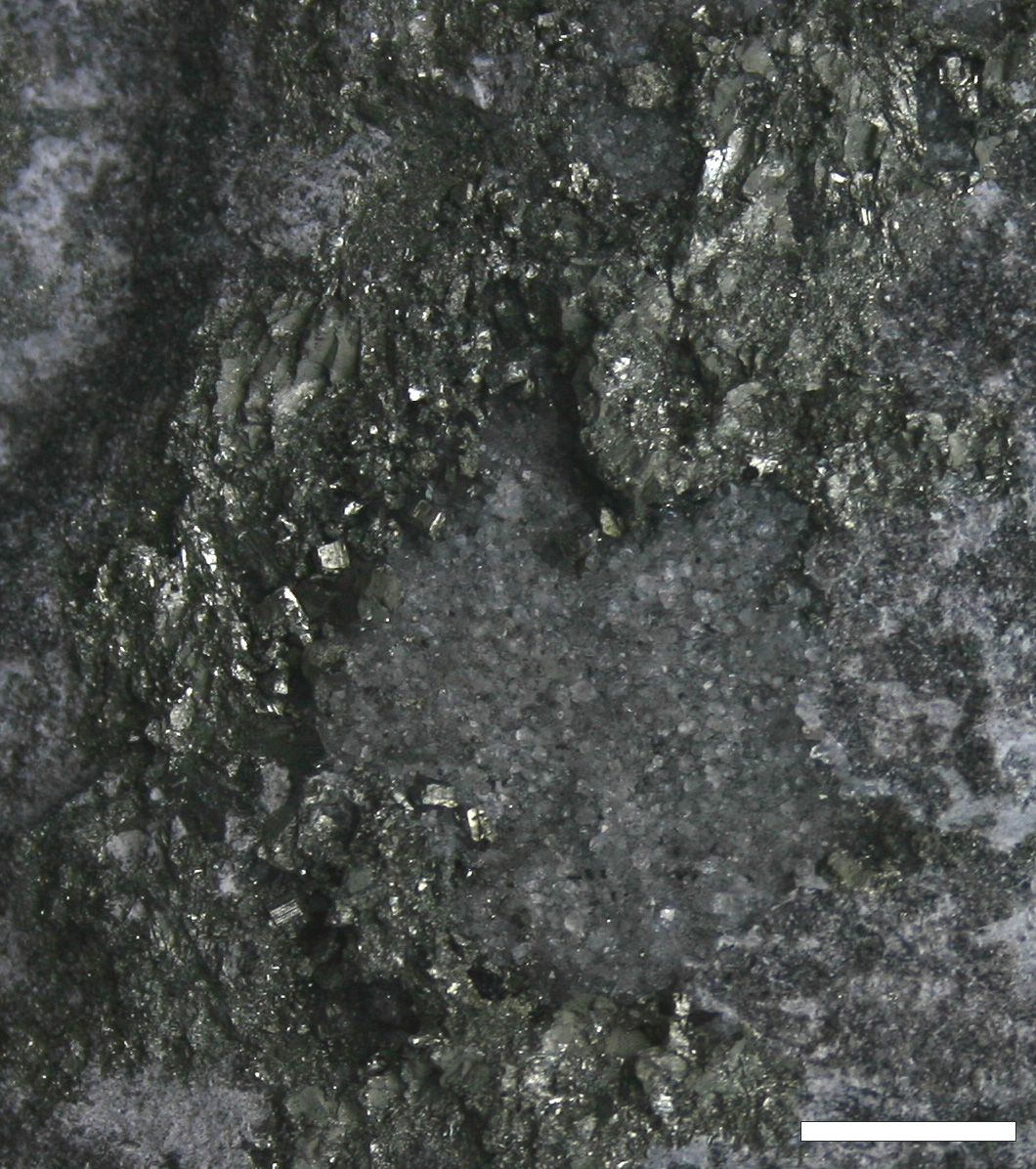
Pyrite in the Bald Eagle Formation, from the Skytop Roadcut where I-99 crosses Bald Eagle Mountain, Centre County, Pennsylvania. Scale bar is 1 cm.

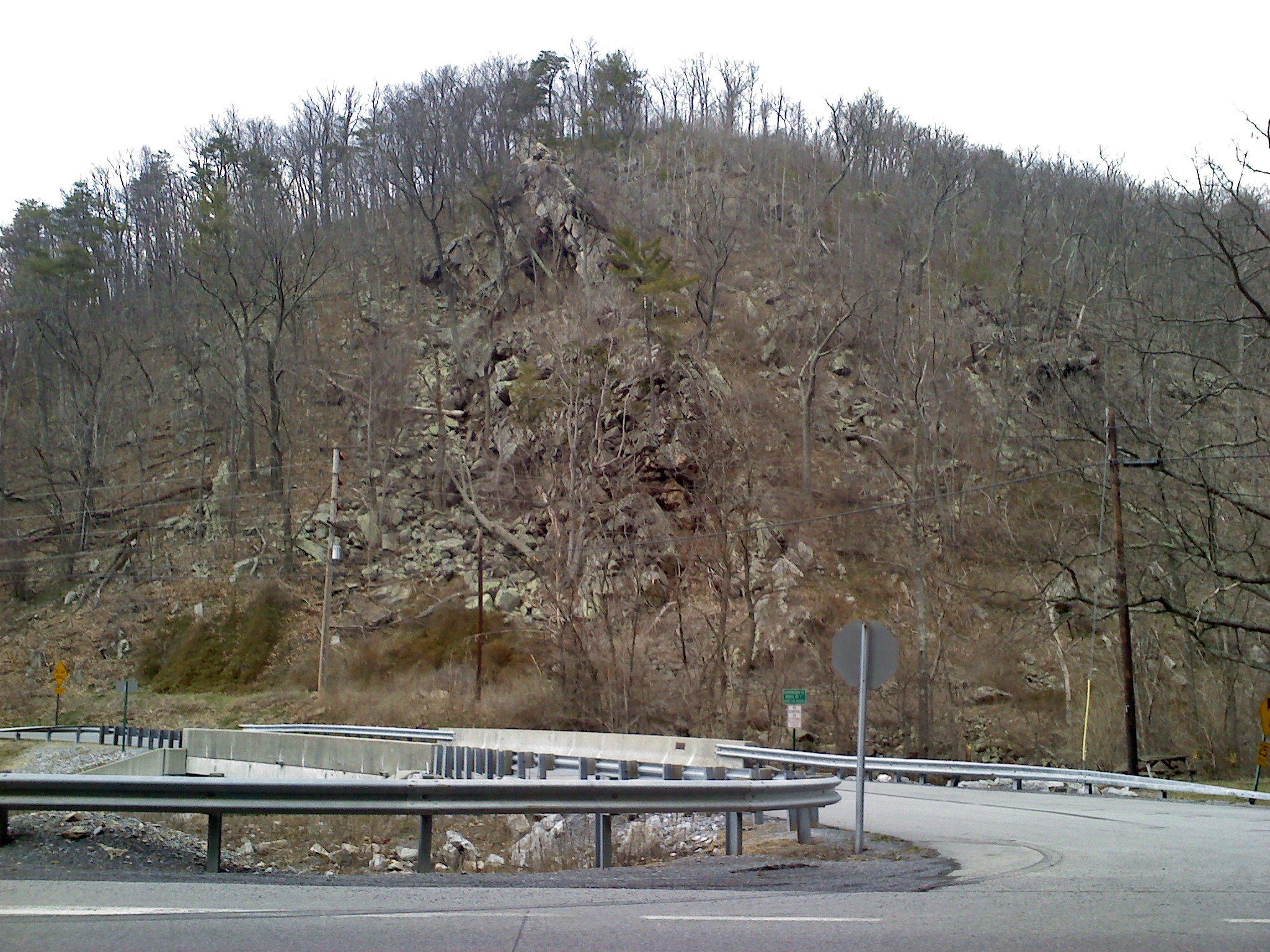
Natural outcrop of the Bald Eagle Formation visible from U.S. Route 522 west of Shade Gap, Huntingdon County, Pennsylvania

The Bald Eagle is a good source of road material, riprap and building stone. However, iron pyrite inclusions may lead to acidic rainwater runoff.

== See also ==
- Geology of Pennsylvania
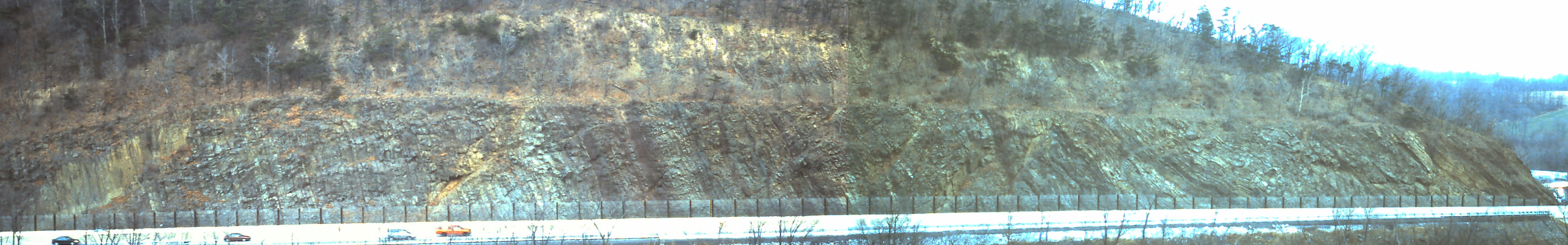
A panorama of the Bald Eagle portion of the Narrows roadcut in Bedford County for the Pennsylvania Turnpike. Stratigraphic up is to the left, and thus the beds are overturned. The beds are highly folded and faulted at right. February 2001.
