= Reedsville Formation =

Rock formation in the USA

- Stratigraphic range: Late Ordovician
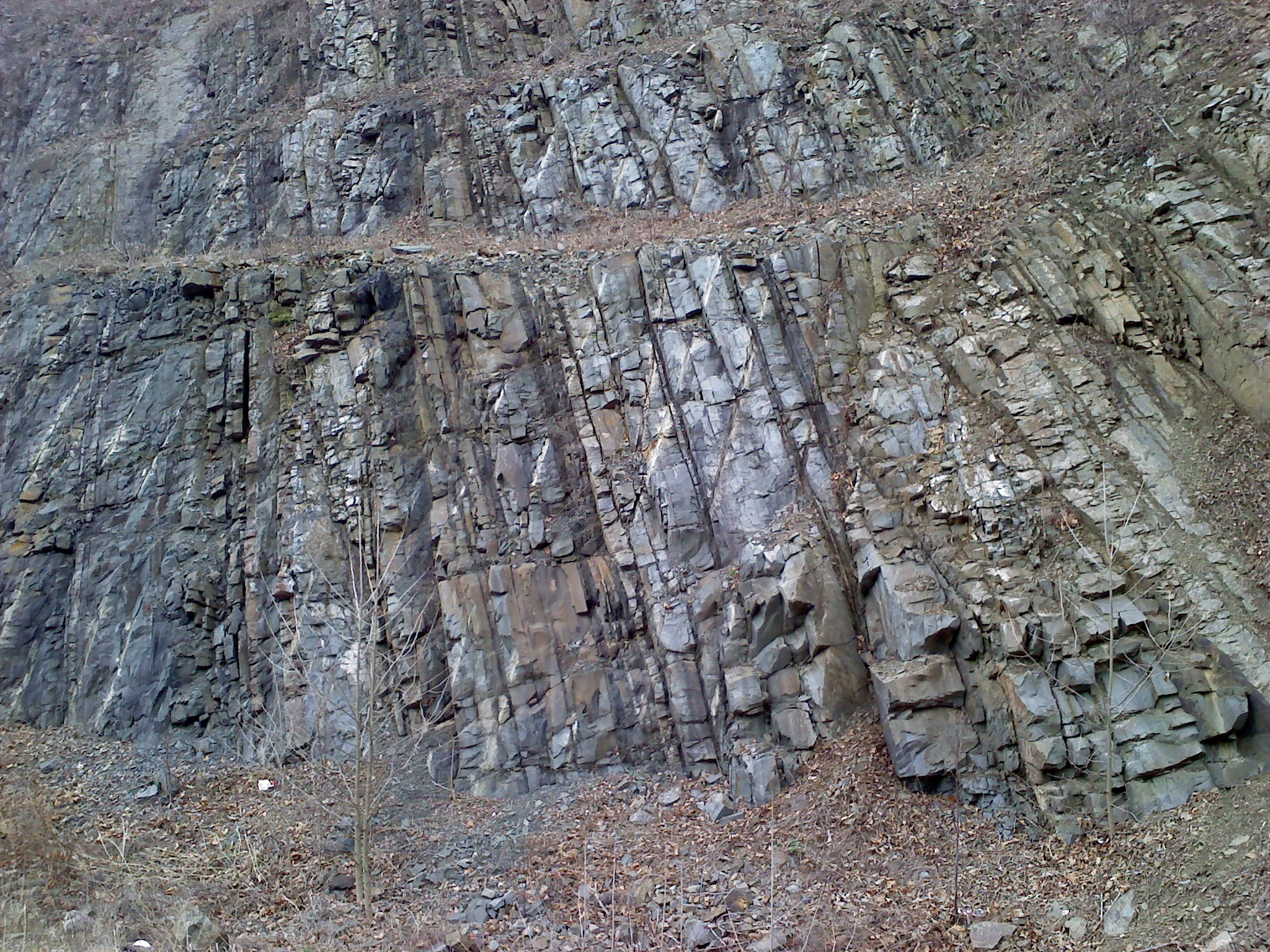
- Outcrop of Reedsville Formation on south side of U.S. Route 522, Blacklog Gap, Huntingdon County, Pennsylvania.
- Type: sedimentary
- Unit of: Chickamauga Group (TN only)
- Underlies: Bald Eagle Formation and Juniata Formation
- Overlies: Antes Gap Shale, Trenton Limestone in TN and Utica Shale in WV

Lithology
- Primary: shale
- Other: sandstone

Location
- Region: Appalachian Mountains
- Extent: Maryland, Pennsylvania, Tennessee, Virginia, West Virginia

Type section
- Named for: Reedsville, Pennsylvania
- Named by: E. O. Ulrich

The Ordovician Reedsville Formation is a mapped surficial bedrock unit in Pennsylvania, Maryland, Virginia, West Virginia, and Tennessee, that extends into the subsurface of Ohio. This rock is a slope-former adjacent to (and stratigraphically below) the prominent ridge-forming Bald Eagle sandstone unit in the Appalachian Mountains. It is often abbreviated Or on geologic maps.

== Description ==
The Reedsville Formation is an olive-gray to dark-gray siltstone, shale, and fine-grained sandstone. In Central Pennsylvania along the Nittany Arch, and extending into the subsurface of northern West Virginia, the base of the Reedsville formation includes the black calcareous Antes Shale formation.

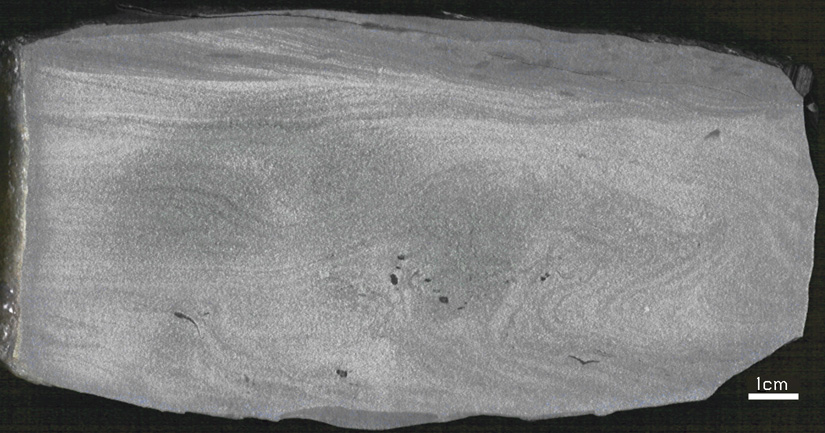
Etched section of carbonaceous sandstone bed of Reedsville Formation from along Rt. 36 near Loysburg, Bedford Co., PA. Soft-sediment deformation evident. Contains sparse fossils (black in section image) - probably brachiopods and bryozoans.

=== Type section ===
The type locality is at Reedsville, Pennsylvania.

=== Age ===
Relative age dating of the Reedsville places it in the Upper Ordovician. It rests conformably atop the Upper Ordovician Coburn Formation at the top of the Trenton Group limestone and conformably below the Bald Eagle Formation.

Isotopic dating of shale mylonite in Pennsylvania reveals a K-Ar age of 372+/-8 Ma.

== Economic uses ==
The Reedsville is quarried locally in borrow pits for road material and fill.

== Palaeontology ==
Taxa	Class	Description	Images
Kionoceras	Cephalopod		

== See also ==
- Geology of Pennsylvania
