= Allensville, Pennsylvania =

Unincorporated community in Pennsylvania, US

Coordinates: 40.53424°N 77.819719°W

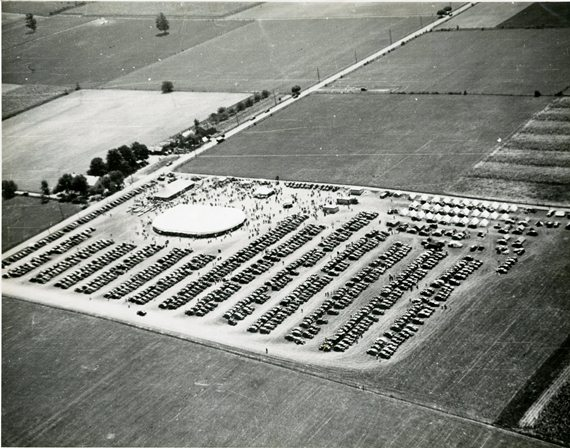
Aerial view of a Mennonite general conference in Allensville.

Allensville is a census-designated place in Menno Township, Pennsylvania, United States. Its population was 479 at the 2020 US census. The town has a high Mennonite and Amish population.

== Gallery ==
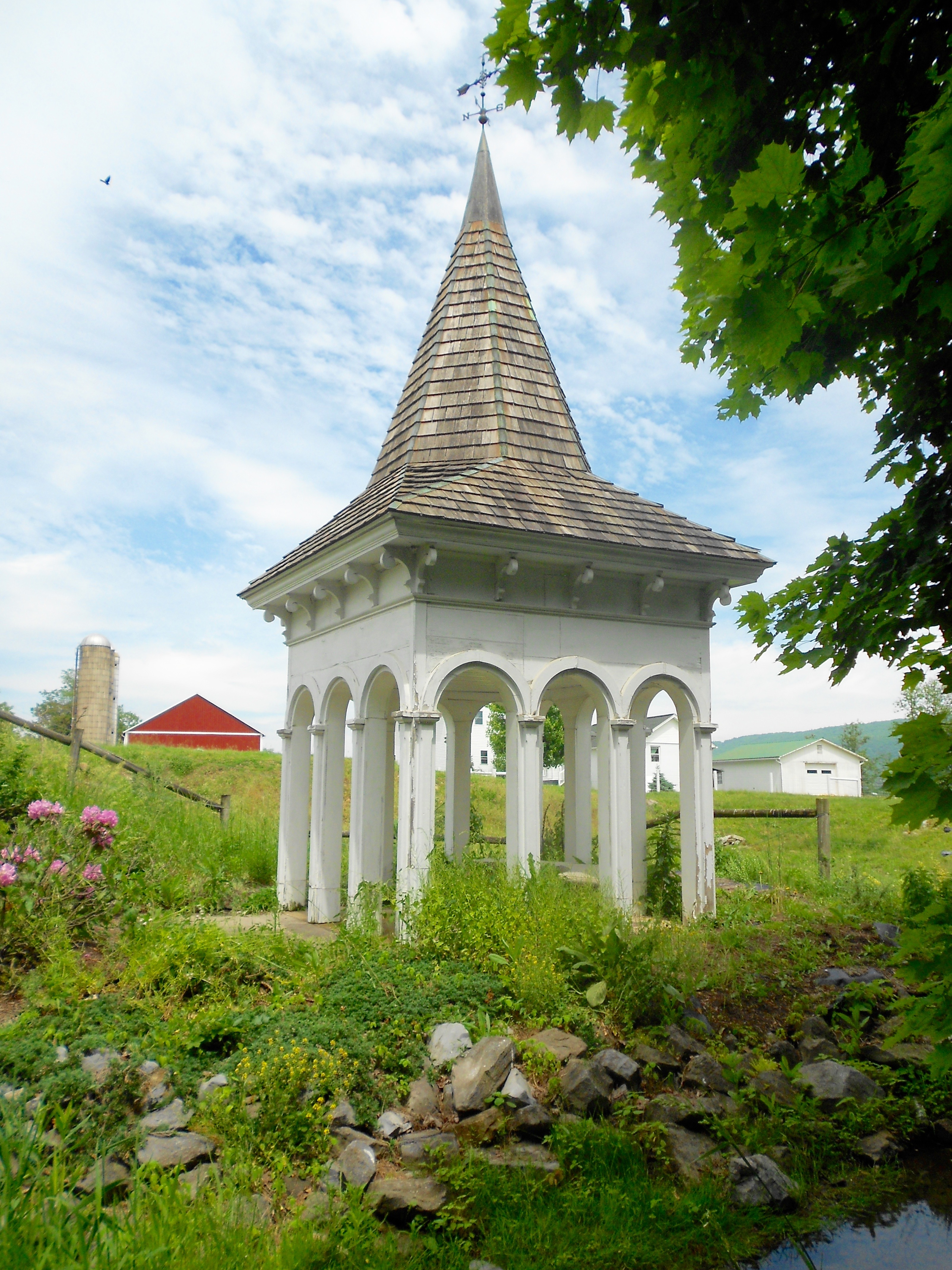
A gazebo apparently made from a steeple near the Community church

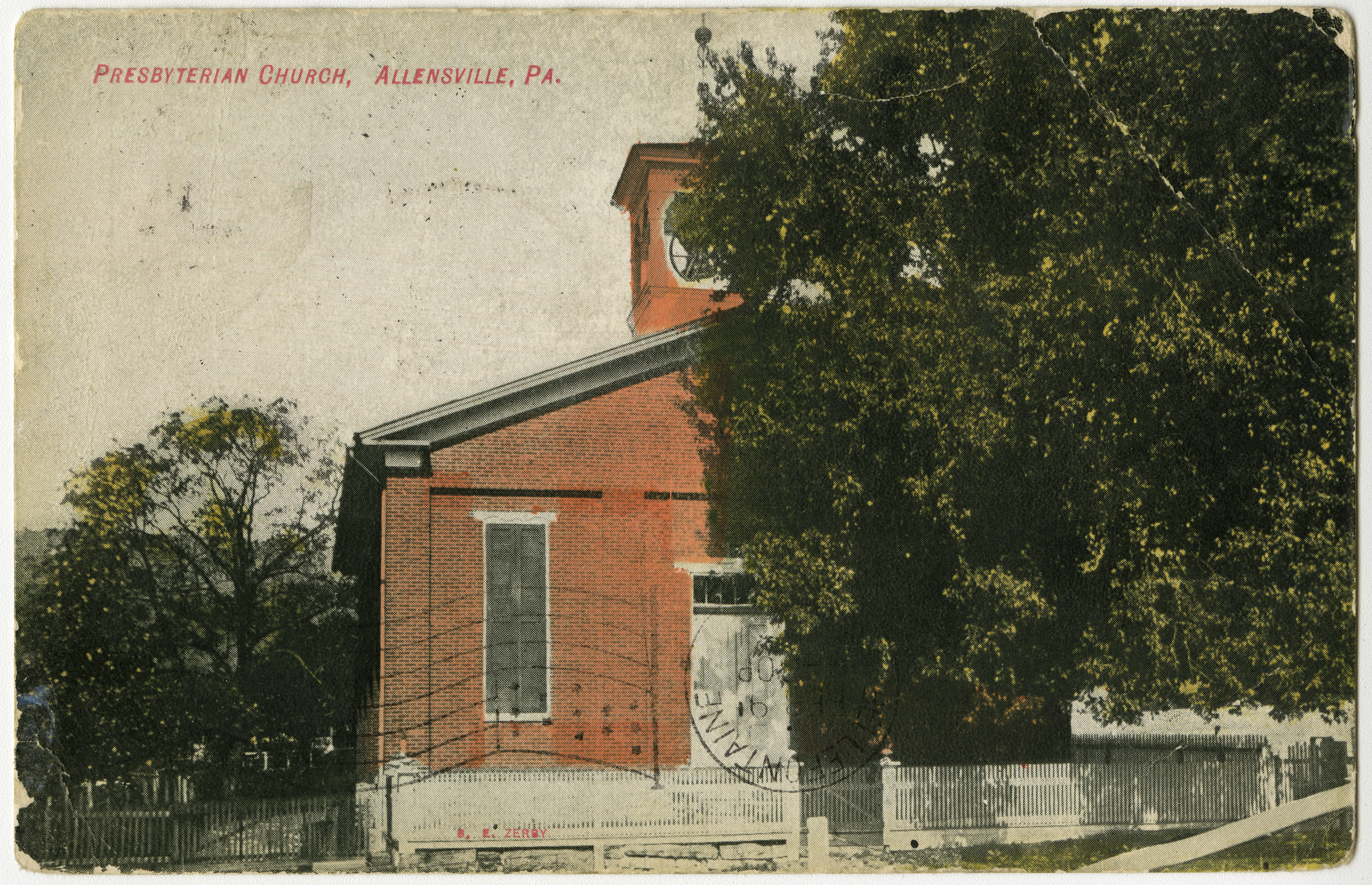
The Presbyterian church in a pre-1923 postcard

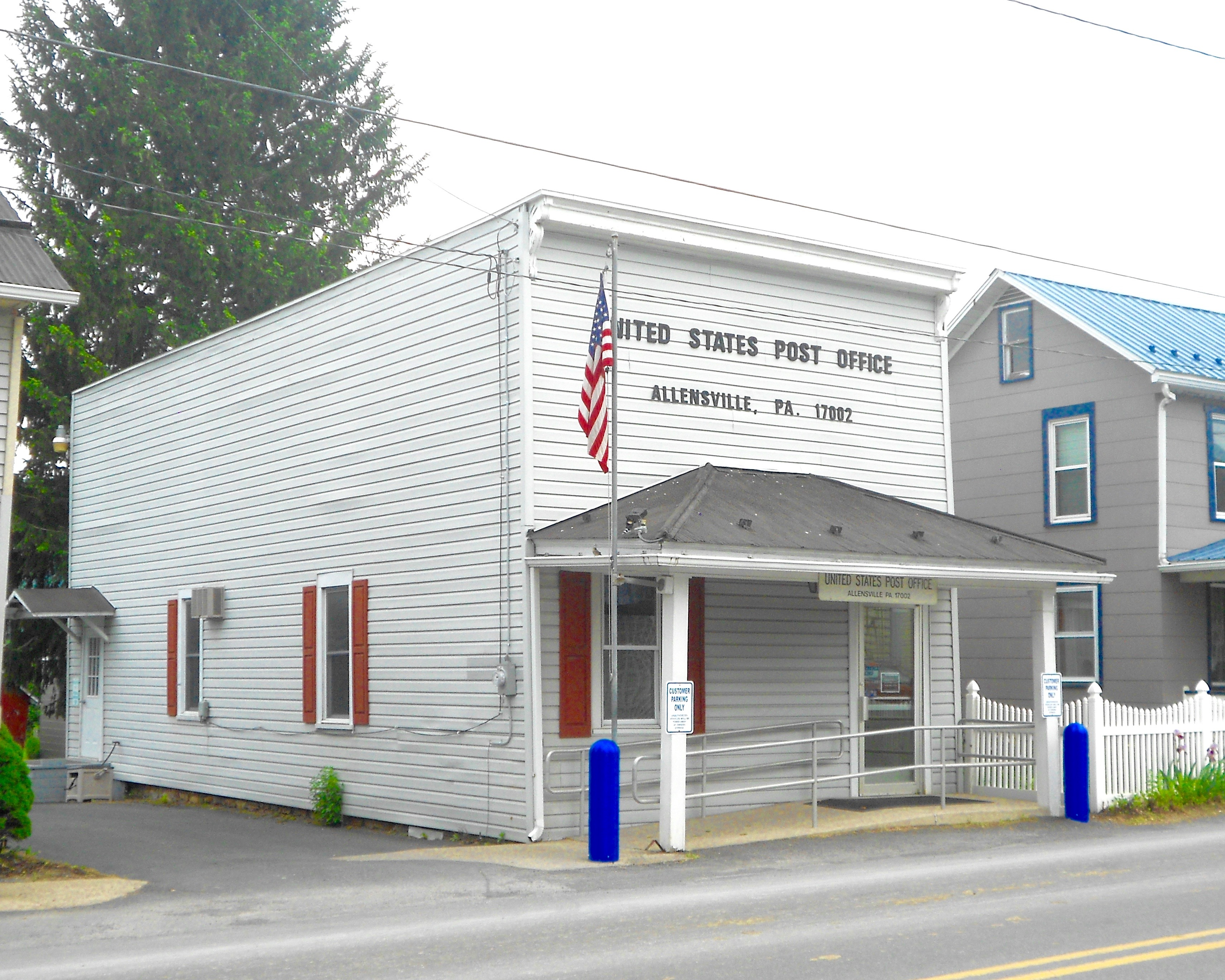
The Allensville post office
