= Northern Potter School District =

School district in Pennsylvania

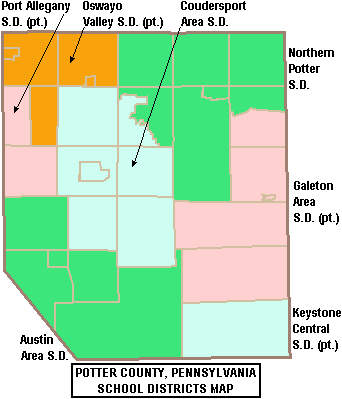

Address
- 745 SR 49 Northern Potter Road Ulysses, Potter County, Pennsylvania, 16948-9570; United States

District information
- Grades: Preschool (4 year olds) -12th (17-18 year olds)

Other information
- Website: northernpottersd.org

The Northern Potter School District is a rural public school district located in northeastern Potter County, Pennsylvania. It serves the municipalities of Ulysses, Ulysses Township, Genesee Township, Bingham Township, and Harrison Township. Portions of Allegany Township and Hector Township are also within its boundaries. Northern Potter School District encompasses approximately 231 square miles (600 km^{2}). According to 2010 federal census data, it serves a resident population of 4,113, making it a district of the fourth class. The educational attainment levels for the School District population (25 years old and over) were 84% high school graduates and 8.2% college graduates. The district is one of the 500 public school districts of Pennsylvania.

According to the Pennsylvania Budget and Policy Center, 51.3% of the District's pupils lived at 185% or below the Federal Poverty level as shown by their eligibility for the federal free or reduced price school meal programs in 2012. In 2009, the Northern Potter School District residents’ per capita income was $14,003, while the median family income was $35,333. In Potter County, the median household income was $39,139. In the Commonwealth, the median family income was $49,501 and the United States median family income was $49,445, in 2010. By 2013, the median household income in the United States rose to $52,100.

Northern Potter School District operates two schools: Northern Potter Children's School (preschool-6th grade) and Northern Potter Junior Senior High School (7th-12th). High school students may choose to attend a half-day vocational training program at Seneca Highlands Area Career and Technical Center, which is located in Port Allegany, Pennsylvania. The Seneca Highlands Intermediate Unit IU9 provides the District with a wide variety of services, like specialized education for disabled students and hearing, speech, and visual disability services, and professional development for staff and faculty.

== Extracurriculars ==
The Northern Potter School District offers a variety of clubs, activities, and an extensive sports program.

== Sports ==
Northern Potter School District is in PIAA District 9. The District funds:

Boys

- Baseball - A
- Basketball- A
- Cross Country - A
- Soccer - A
- Track and Field - AA

Girls

- Basketball - A
- Cross Country - A
- Softball - A
- Track and Field - AA
- Volleyball - A

Junior High School Sports

Boys

- Basketball
- Cross Country
- Soccer
- Track and Field

Girls

- Basketball
- Cross Country
- Track and Field
- Volleyball

According to PIAA directory July 2015
