= Northern Potter Junior Senior High School =

Coordinates: 41.924160°N 77.733187°W

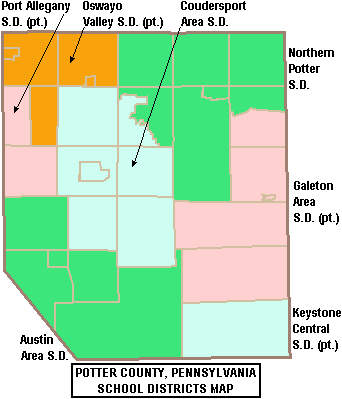

Location
- 763 Northern Potter Road; Ulysses, Potter County, Pennsylvania 16948-9570; United States

Information
- Type: Public
- Principal: Susan A Valentine
- Faculty: 26 teachers (2012)
- Grades: 7th –12th grade
- Enrollment: 252 pupils (2015)
- Language: English
- Colors: Blue & Gold
- Mascot: Panther
- Feeder schools: Northern Potter Childrens School
- Website: northernpottersd.org

Northern Potter Junior Senior High School is a diminutive, rural, public junior senior high school located in Ulysses, Potter County, Pennsylvania. It is the sole high school operated by the Northern Potter School District. The School serves the municipalities of Ulysses, Ulysses Township, Genesee, Bingham, and Harrison as well as portions of Allegany Township and Hector Township. In 2015, enrollment was reported as 252 pupils in 7th through 12th grades. Northern Potter Junior Senior High School employed 26 teachers.

Northern Potter Junior Senior High School students may choose to attend a half day vocational training program at Seneca Highlands Area Career and Technical Center, which is located in Port Allegany, McKean County, Pennsylvania. The Seneca HIghlands Intermediate Unit IU9 provides the School with a wide variety of services like specialized education for disabled students and hearing, speech and visual disability services and professional development for staff and faculty.

== Extracurriculars ==
The Northern Potter School District offers a variety of clubs, activities and an extensive sports program.

=== Sports ===
The District funds:

Boys

- Baseball - A
- Basketball- A
- Cross Country - A
- Soccer - A
- Track and Field - AA

Girls

- Basketball - A
- Cross Country - A
- Softball - A
- Track and Field - AA
- Volleyball - A

Junior High School Sports

Boys

- Basketball
- Cross Country
- Soccer
- Track and Field - added 2014

Girls

- Basketball
- Cross Country
- Volleyball
- Track and Field - added 2014

According to PIAA directory July 2014

== Notable alumni ==
- Tracey Poirier (1992), Vermont National Guard brigadier general
