= Galeton Area School District =

School district in Pennsylvania

Coordinates: 41.68214°N 77.60604°W

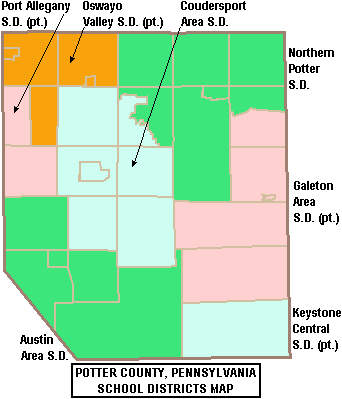

Address
- 25 Bridge Street Galeton, Potter County and Tioga County, Pennsylvania, 16922; United States

Other information
- Website: www.gasd.net

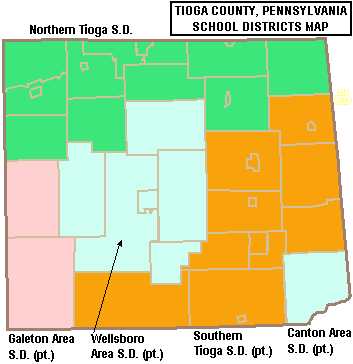
Tioga County School Districts

The Galeton Area School District is a diminutive, rural public school district operating in Potter County and Tioga County in Pennsylvania. Galeton Area School District encompasses approximately 325 square miles (840 km^{2}). It serves the municipalities of Galeton, Abbott Township, West Branch Township, Pike Township, and a portion of Hector Township in Potter County, plus Elk Township and Gaines Township in Tioga County, Pennsylvania. According to 2000 federal census data, the district served a resident population of 3,292. By 2010, the district's population declined to 2,929 people. The educational attainment levels for the Galeton Area School District population (25 years old and over) were 82.7% high school graduates and 9.6% college graduates.

According to the Pennsylvania Budget and Policy Center, 57.1% of the Galeton Area School District's pupils lived at 185% or below the Federal Poverty level as shown by their eligibility for the federal free or reduced price school meal programs in 2012. In 2009, the district residents’ per capita income was $17,951, while the median family income was $35,486. In Potter County, the median household income was $39,193. By 2013, the median household income in the United States rose to $52,100.

Galeton Area School District operates one school building which houses all grades preschool-12th.

High school students may choose dual enrollment and half-day vocational training program at Seneca Highlands Area Career and Technical Center, which is located in Port Allegany, McKean County, Pennsylvania. The Seneca Highlands Intermediate Unit IU9 provides the district with a wide variety of services like specialized education for disabled students and hearing, speech and visual disability services and professional development for staff and faculty.

== Extracurriculars ==
Galeton Area School District offers a variety of clubs, activities and a sports program.

=== Sports ===
The district funds:

Varsity

Boys

- Baseball - A
- Basketball- A
- Soccer - A
- Tennis - AA

Girls

- Basketball - A
- Softball - A
- Girls' Tennis - AA
- Volleyball - A

Junior High School Sports

Boys

- Basketball
- Soccer
- Tennis* added 2014

Girls

- Basketball
- Girls' Tennis* added 2014
- Volleyball

According to PIAA directory July 2014
