= Tracey Poirier =

U.S. Army brigadier general

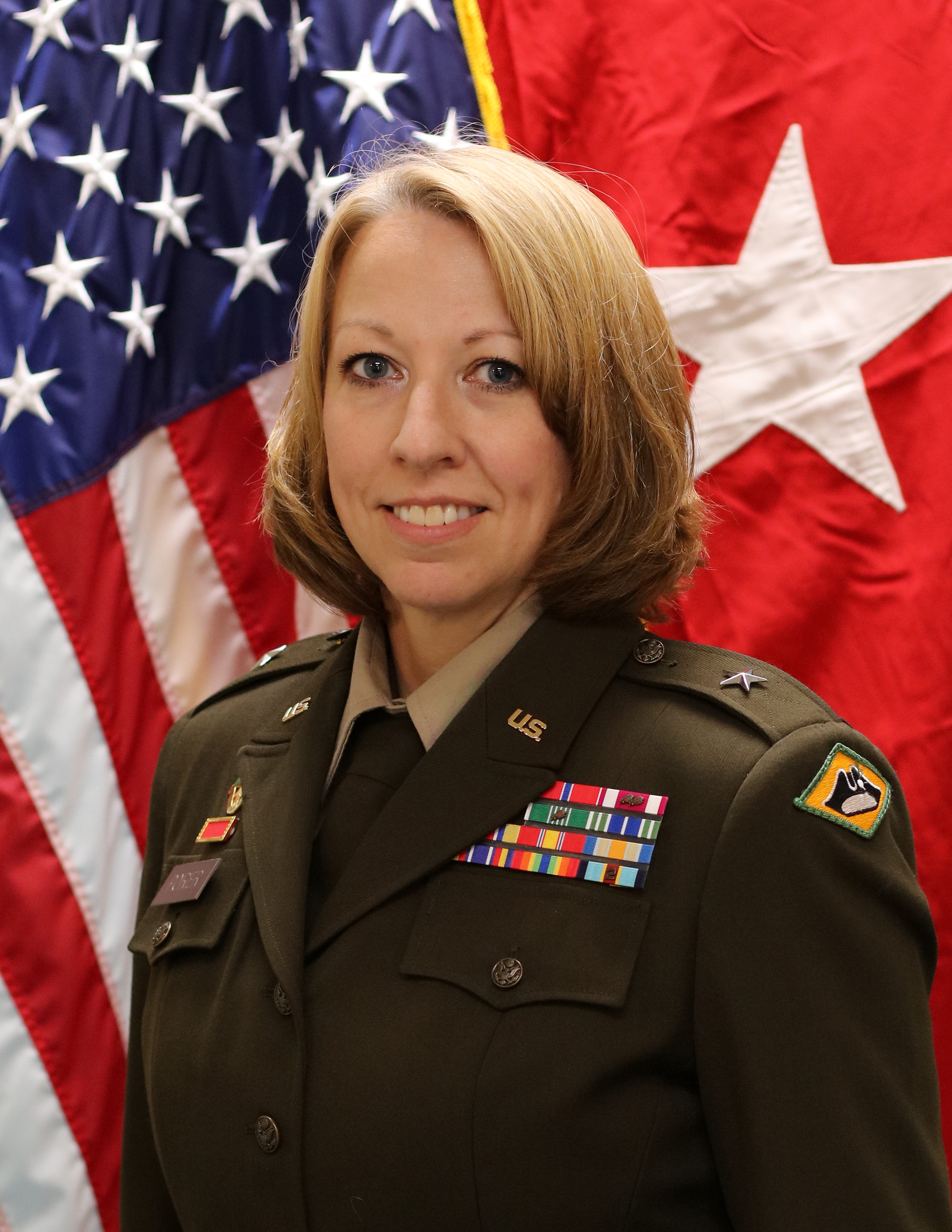
- Poirier as a brigadier general in 2023
- Born: 1974 (age 51–52)
- Alma mater: Norwich University (B.A.); University of Oxford (M.St., M.S.); United States Army War College (MSS)
- Spouse: Leonard J. Poirier
- Children: 4
- Military career
- Service: United States Marine Corps; United States Army
- Service years: 1991–2025
- Rank: Brigadier General
- Unit: Vermont National Guard
- Commands: 186th Brigade Support Battalion; 124th Regiment (Regional Training Institute)
- Known for: Norwich University's first Rhodes Scholar
- Wars: Iraq War
- Awards: Bronze Star Medal; Meritorious Service Medal (3); Army Commendation Medal (2); Army Achievement Medal
- Other work: Assistant Vice President for Student Affairs, Norwich University

Tracey Poirier (b. 1974) is retired Army National Guard officer from Vermont. A veteran of the United States Marine Corps and United States Army, she served in the military from 1991 to 2025, and was the director of the joint staff for the Vermont National Guard from 2022 to 2025. Poirier's command assignments included the 186th Brigade Support Battalion (2013 to 2016) and 124th Regiment (Regional Training Institute) (2019 to 2021). She was promoted to brigadier general in July 2023, and her awards include the Bronze Star Medal, Meritorious Service Medal with two oak leaf clusters, Army Commendation Medal with oak leaf cluster, and Army Achievement Medal.

== Early life ==
Tracey L. (Jones) Poirier was born in 1974 and is originally from Genesee, Pennsylvania. A 1992 graduate of Northern Potter High School, she was her class valedictorian. Poirier joined the United States Army Reserve in 1991, and served as a unit supply specialist in Wellsville, New York.

Poirier attended Norwich University with a Reserve Officers' Training Corps scholarship from 1992 to 1996. She graduated with a Bachelor of Arts degree in English and Media Communications. Poirier was awarded a Rhodes Scholarship, a first for a Norwich University graduate, and studied at Hertford College of the University of Oxford, where she received a Master of Studies degree in Social Anthropology in 1997 and a Master of Science degree in Industrial Relations and Human Resource Management in 1998.

== Start of career ==
Poirier served in the Marines for eight years, including postings with United States Marine Corps Forces Europe and Africa, at Marine Corps Base Quantico, Virginia, and at Camp H. M. Smith, Hawaii. While stationed in Hawaii, she deployed in support of Operation Iraqi Freedom.

Poirier joined the Vermont Army National Guard in 2006, and her assignments included company commander, Tactical Information Operations Course instructor, and personnel staff officer (S-1) for the 124th Regiment (Regional Training Institute). She later served as S-1 of the 86th Infantry Brigade Combat Team's rear detachment during the brigade's deployment to Afghanistan, and support operations officer for the 186th Brigade Support Battalion.

== Continued career ==
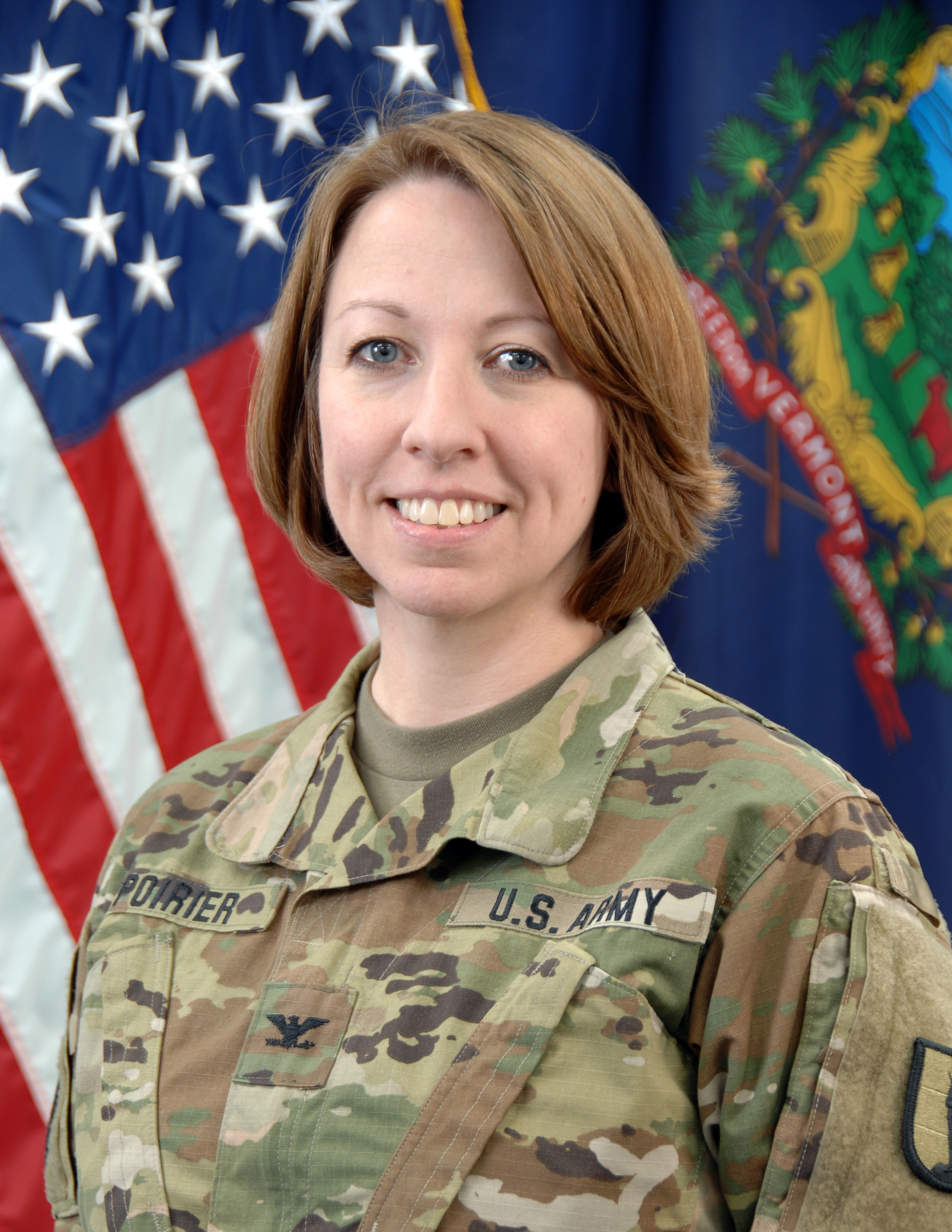
Poirier as a colonel in 2021

Poirier commanded the 186th Brigade Support Battalion from September 2013 to April 2016. She then attended the United States Army War College (AWC), from which she graduated in June 2017 with a Master of Strategic Studies degree. Poirier was an AWC Carlisle Scholar as well as a Distinguished Graduate. In 2017 and 2018, Poirier again served in Iraq, this time with Joint Special Operations Command. She commanded the 124th Regiment from April 2019 to April 2021. She was the first female commander of the 124th Regiment Regional Training Institute.

In January 2021, Poirier left her position as assistant vice president for student affairs at Norwich University to become the full-time chief of staff for the Vermont Army National Guard. In May 2022, she was assigned as the Vermont National Guard's full-time director of the joint staff. She was promoted to brigadier general in July 2023, to date from November 2022, the first female member of the Vermont Army National Guard to attain general officer's rank. She served in this position until August 2025 and was a temporary assistant general until October 2025, when she retired.

== Family ==
Poirier is married to Colonel Leonard J. Poirier, who commanded the 86th Infantry Brigade Combat Team from 2022 to 2024. They are the parents of four children, and reside in Barre Town.

== Awards ==
Poirier's awards include:

- Bronze Star Medal
- Meritorious Service Medal with two oak leaf clusters
- Army Commendation Medal with oak leaf cluster
- Army Achievement Medal
- Army Reserve Components Achievement Medal
- National Defense Service Medal
- Inherent Resolve Campaign Medal
- Global War on Terrorism Service Medal
- Army Service Ribbon
- Army Overseas Service Ribbon with numeral 2

In 2018, Norwich University began construction of a memorial staircase to commemorate the bicentennial of the school's 1819 founding. The steps were built between the southeast corner of the Upper Parade Ground and the Sullivan Museum and History Center, and contain the names of 78 prominent individuals, including Poirier, who are associated with the university.

== Effective dates of promotion ==
Poirier's effective dates of promotion are:

- Brigadier General, 30 November 2022
- Colonel, 28 February 2019
- Lieutenant Colonel, 2 May 2014
- Major, 23 November 2009
- Captain, 17 September 2002
- First Lieutenant, 24 May 1998
- Second Lieutenant, 24 May 1996
