= Pike Township, Pennsylvania =

Pike Township is the name of some places in the U.S. state of Pennsylvania:

- Pike Township, Berks County, Pennsylvania
- Pike Township, Bradford County, Pennsylvania
- Pike Township, Clearfield County, Pennsylvania
- Pike Township, Potter County, Pennsylvania
