= East Fork, Pennsylvania =

Unincorporated community in Pennsylvania, US

Coordinates: 41.5300°N 77.9374°W

- Road district
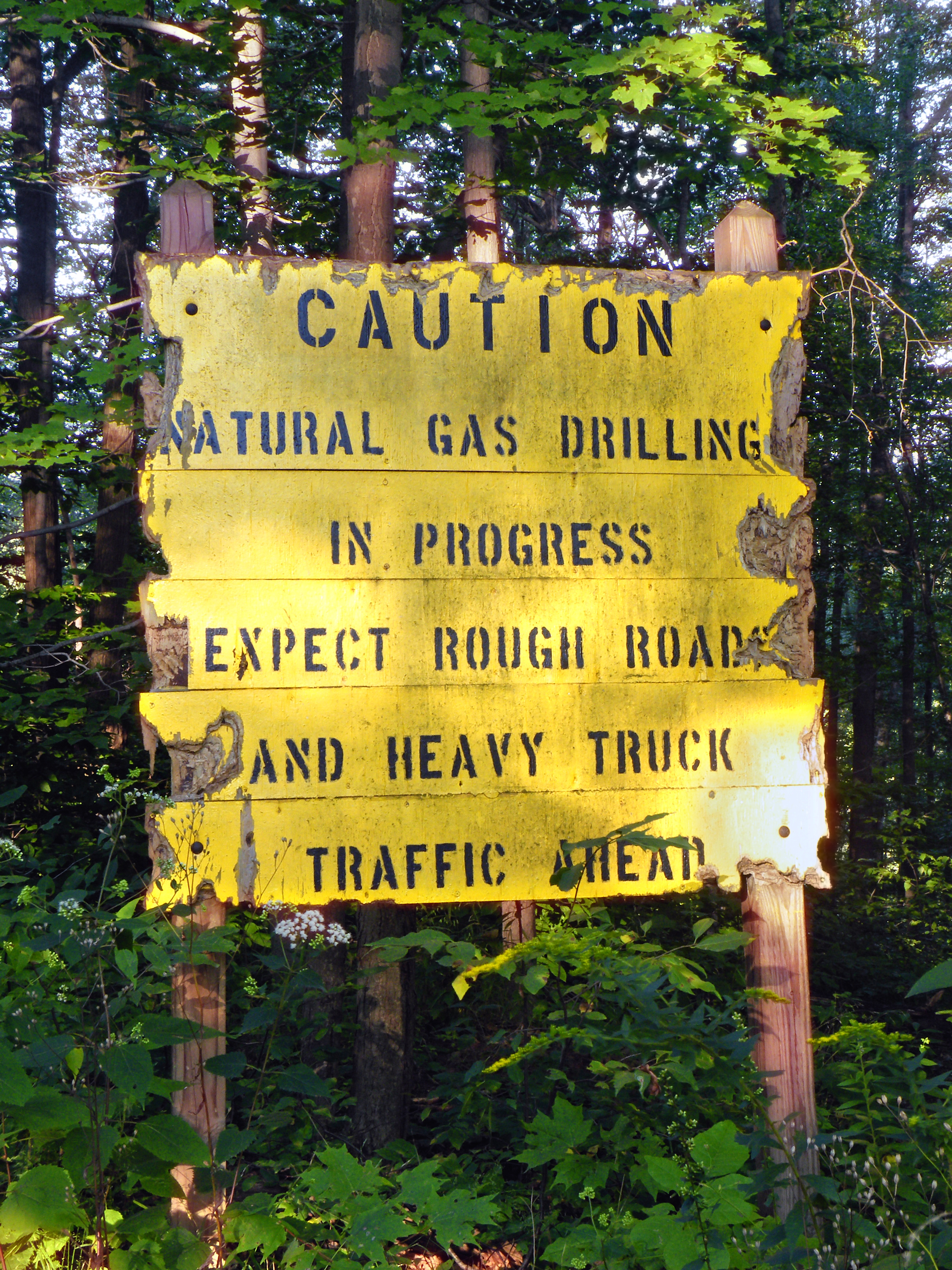
- Unpaved McConnell Road passes by many Marcellus Shale natural gas-drilling sites as it traverses the Susquehannock State Forest

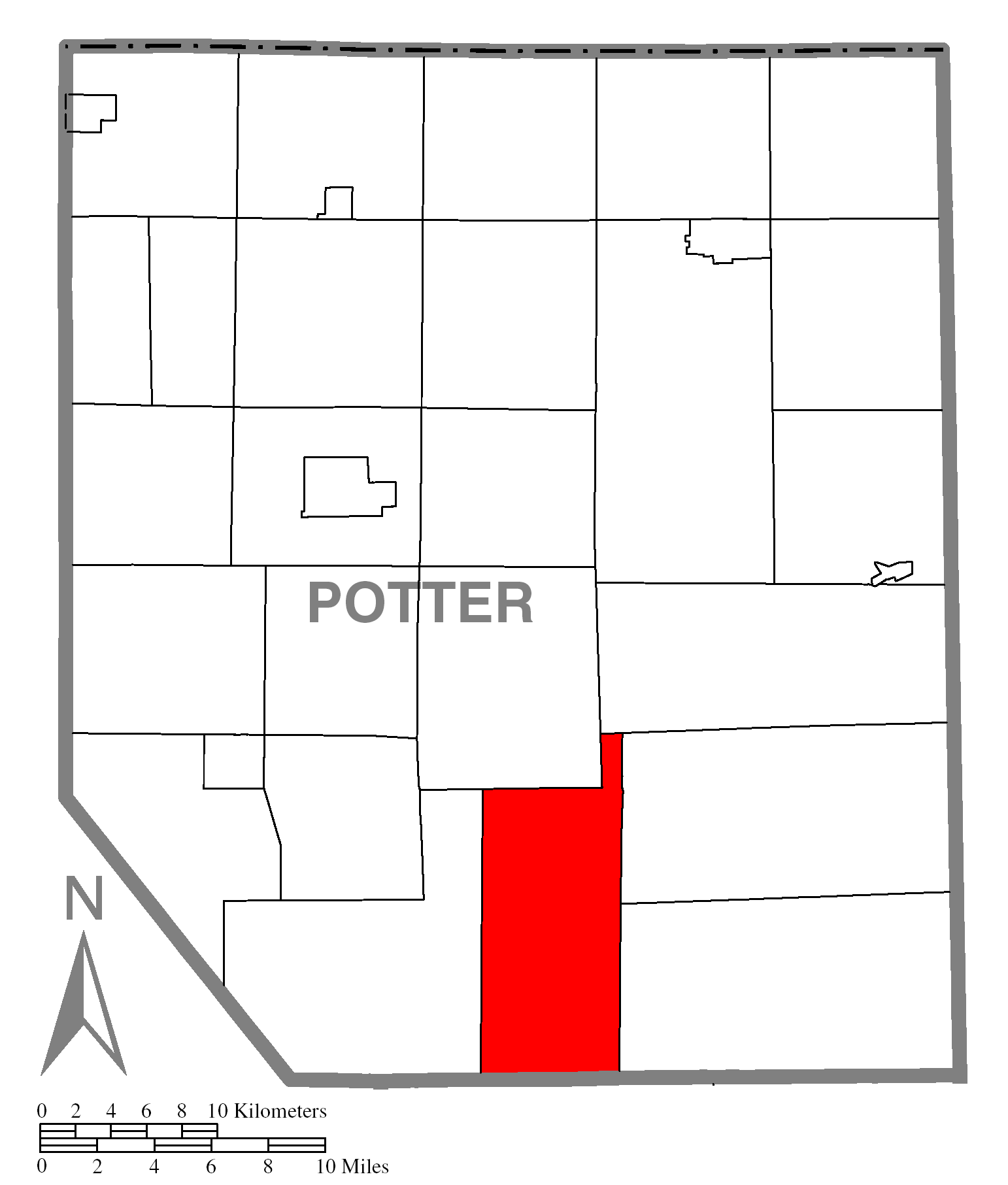
- Map of Potter County, Pennsylvania highlighting East Fork

- Map of Potter County, Pennsylvania
- Country: United States
- State: Pennsylvania
- County: Potter

Government
  - Fire District: Austin Volunteer Fire Dept.

Area
  - Total: 51.0 sq mi (132.2 km^{2})

Population (2000)
  - Total: 14
  - Density: 0.26/sq mi (0.1/km^{2})
- Time zone: UTC-5 (EST)
  - Summer (DST): UTC-4 (EDT)

East Fork Road District was a sui generis municipality in Potter County, Pennsylvania, United States. The population was 14 at the 2000 census. On January 1, 2004, the district was dissolved and the area merged with Wharton Township.

The vast majority of the district was located within the Susquehannock State Forest, with only a narrow strip of property along East Fork Road being privately owned. East Fork was the only municipal division of its kind in Pennsylvania; comparable in geographic size to the townships of Potter County, but its encapsulation preventing it from normal growth. Its extremely low population prevented it from having the full municipal government of a Second Class Pennsylvania township.

== Geography ==
According to the United States Census Bureau, the district had a total area of 132.2 km^{2} (51.0 sq mi), all land. Its name came from the East Fork of the First Fork Sinnemahoning Creek and the road that ran along it.

East Fork was bordered by Summit Township to the north and west, West Branch Township to the north, Abbott and Stewardson Townships to the east, Clinton County to the south and Wharton Township to the west.

== Demographics ==
As of the census of 2000, there were 14 people, 7 households, and 5 families residing in the district. The population density was 0.1 people /km^{2} (0.26 people/mi^{2}). There were 152 housing units at an average density of 1.1 units /km^{2} (2.8 units/mi^{2}); thus, East Fork had more than twenty times as many housing units as it did households to use them. The racial makeup of the district was entirely white.

There were seven households, out of which none had children under the age of 18 living with them, six were married couples living together, one had a female householder with no husband present, and one was a non-family. One household was a single individual, and one had someone living alone who was 65 years of age or older. The average household size was 2.00 and the average family size was 2.17.

In the district the population was spread out, with no children under 18, one from 18 to 24, four from 25 to 44, five from 45 to 64, and four who were 65 years of age or older. The median age was 59 years. Eight men and six women lived in the district.

The median income for a household in the district was $19,375, and the median income for a family was $21,250. The per capita income for the district was $11,447. There were no families and three people living below the poverty line, including one person over 64.
