= Mills, Pennsylvania =

Unincorporated community in Pennsylvania, US

- Unincorporated community
- Location within Pennsylvania
- Coordinates: 41°56′46″N 77°41′11″W
- Country: United States
- State: Pennsylvania
- County: Potter
- Elevation: 1,736 ft (529 m)
- Time zone: UTC-5 (Eastern (EST))
  - Summer (DST): UTC-4 (EDT)
- ZIP code: 16937
- Area code: 814
- GNIS feature ID: 1181279

Mills is an unincorporated community in Potter County, Pennsylvania, United States. The community is located along Pennsylvania Route 49, 4.9 miles (7.9 km) northeast of Ulysses. Mills has a post office with ZIP code 16937.
