= Bingham Township, Pennsylvania =

Township in Pennsylvania, US

Coordinates: 41°57′00″N 77°44′29″W

- Township
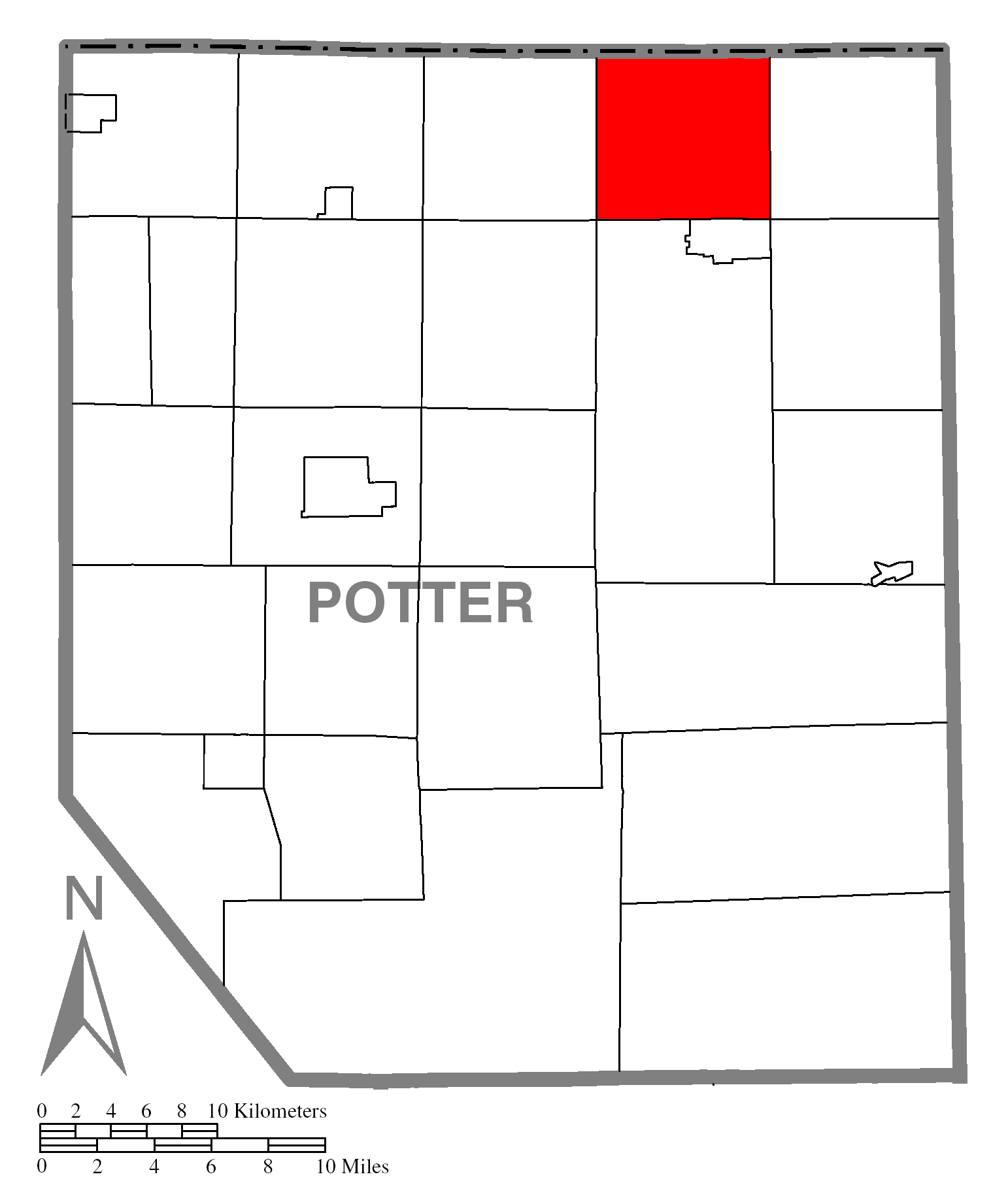
- Map of Potter County, Pennsylvania highlighting Bingham Township

- Map of Potter County, Pennsylvania
- Country: United States
- State: Pennsylvania
- County: Potter
- Settled: 1820
- Incorporated: 1856

Area
  - Total: 35.74 sq mi (92.56 km^{2})
  - Land: 35.73 sq mi (92.54 km^{2})
  - Water: 0.0077 sq mi (0.02 km^{2})

Population (2020)
  - Total: 621 ▼
  - Estimate (2021): 616
  - Density: 18.9/sq mi (7.29/km^{2})
- Time zone: UTC-5 (EST)
  - Summer (DST): UTC-4 (EDT)
- FIPS code: 42-105-06432

Bingham Township is a township in Potter County, Pennsylvania, United States. The population was 621 at the 2020 census.

== Geography ==
According to the United States Census Bureau, the township has a total area of 35.9 square miles (93 km^{2}), of which 35.8 square miles (93 km^{2}) is land and 0.1 square miles (0.26 km^{2}) (0.17%) is water.

Bingham Township is bordered by New York to the north, Harrison Township to the east, the borough of Ulysses and Ulysses Township to the south and Genesee Township to the west.

== Demographics ==
Historical population
Census	Pop.	Note	%±
2000	687		—
2010	684		−0.4%
2020	621		−9.2%
2021 (est.)	616		−0.8%

As of the census of 2000, there were 687 people, 224 households, and 185 families residing in the township. The population density was 19.2 people per square mile (7.4 people/km^{2}). There were 308 housing units at an average density of 8.6 units per square mile (3.3 units/km^{2}). The racial makeup of the township was 97.96% White, 0.29% African American, 1.02% Native American, and 0.73% from two or more races.

There were 224 households, out of which 38.8% had children under the age of 18 living with them, 73.2% were married couples living together, 4.0% had a female householder with no husband present, and 17.0% were non-families. 14.7% of all households were made up of individuals, and 7.1% had someone living alone who was 65 years of age or older. The average household size was 3.07 and the average family size was 3.39.

In the township the population was spread out, with 29.7% under the age of 18, 9.9% from 18 to 24, 25.8% from 25 to 44, 23.7% from 45 to 64, and 10.9% who were 65 years of age or older. The median age was 35 years. For every 100 females, there were 106.9 males. For every 100 females age 18 and over, there were 105.5 males.

The median income for a household in the township was $38,281, and the median income for a family was $39,375. Males had a median income of $26,771 versus $16,964 for females. The per capita income for the township was $13,441. About 10.3% of families and 14.1% of the population were below the poverty line, including 20.7% of those under age 18 and 2.2% of those age 65 or over.
