= Oswayo, Pennsylvania =

Borough in Pennsylvania, US

- Borough
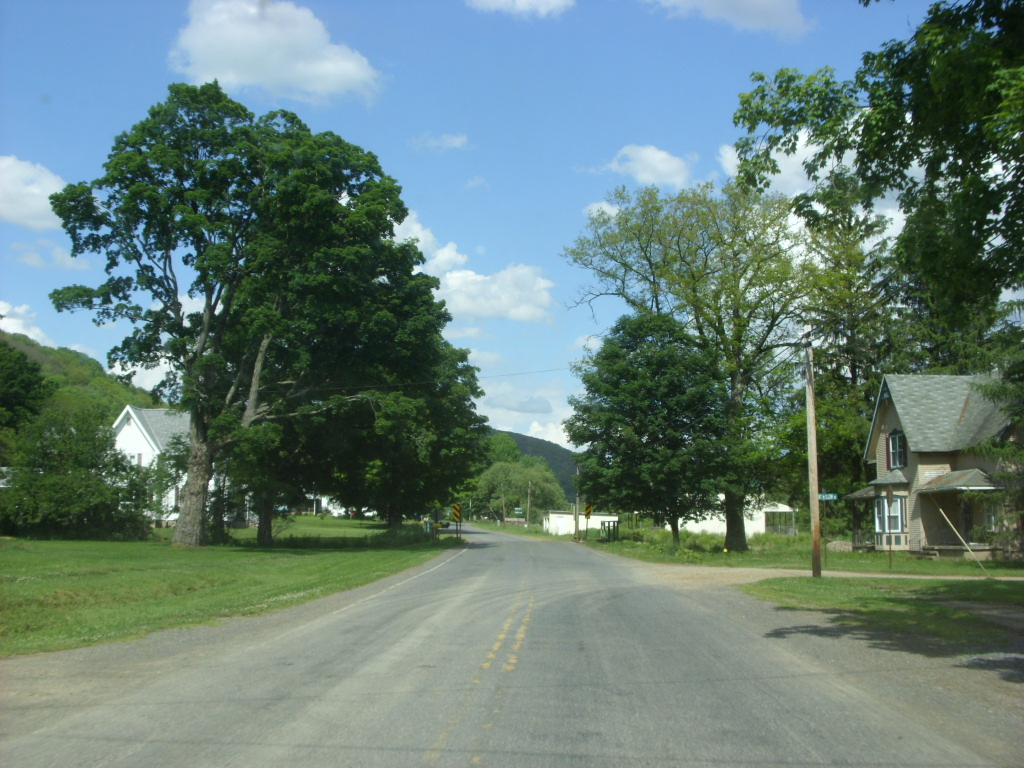
- Eastbound PA 244 in Oswayo

- Location of Oswayo in Potter County, Pennsylvania.

- Location within the U.S. state of Pennsylvania Oswayo (the United States)
- Coordinates: 41°55′16″N 78°01′05″W
- Country: United States
- State: Pennsylvania
- County: Potter
- Settled: 1820
- Incorporated (borough): 1901

Area
  - Total: 1.08 sq mi (2.80 km^{2})
  - Land: 1.08 sq mi (2.80 km^{2})
  - Water: 0 sq mi (0.00 km^{2})
- Elevation (borough benchmark): 1,704 ft (519 m)
- Highest elevation (northwestern boundary of borough): 2,300 ft (700 m)
- Lowest elevation (Oswayo Creek): 1,680 ft (510 m)

Population (2020)
  - Total: 134
  - Density: 123.9/sq mi (47.84/km^{2})
- Time zone: Eastern (EST)
  - Summer (DST): EDT
- Zip code: 16915
- Area code: 814
- FIPS code: 42-57280

Oswayo is a borough in Potter County, Pennsylvania, United States. The population was 133 at the 2020 census.

Oswayo is a Native American name purported to mean "the pine forest".

== Geography ==
Oswayo is located at 41°55′16″N 78°1′5″W (41.921171, -78.018160).

According to the United States Census Bureau, the borough has a total area of 1.1 square miles (2.8 km^{2}), all land.

=== Climate ===
Climate data for Oswayo 1 ENE, Pennsylvania, 1991–2020 normals: 1710ft (521m)
Month	Jan	Feb	Mar	Apr	May	Jun	Jul	Aug	Sep	Oct	Nov	Dec	Year
Record high °F (°C)	65 (18)	71 (22)	77 (25)	88 (31)	92 (33)	94 (34)	102 (39)	92 (33)	94 (34)	84 (29)	76 (24)	67 (19)	102 (39)
Mean maximum °F (°C)	52.9 (11.6)	53.3 (11.8)	64.7 (18.2)	79.0 (26.1)	85.4 (29.7)	87.5 (30.8)	88.6 (31.4)	87.0 (30.6)	84.4 (29.1)	76.8 (24.9)	67.3 (19.6)	55.6 (13.1)	90.3 (32.4)
Mean daily maximum °F (°C)	30.4 (−0.9)	33.0 (0.6)	42.2 (5.7)	55.0 (12.8)	67.5 (19.7)	75.1 (23.9)	78.9 (26.1)	77.7 (25.4)	70.5 (21.4)	58.7 (14.8)	45.9 (7.7)	34.8 (1.6)	55.8 (13.2)
Daily mean °F (°C)	20.7 (−6.3)	22.3 (−5.4)	30.6 (−0.8)	42.1 (5.6)	53.8 (12.1)	62.5 (16.9)	65.9 (18.8)	64.6 (18.1)	57.6 (14.2)	46.9 (8.3)	35.8 (2.1)	26.9 (−2.8)	44.1 (6.7)
Mean daily minimum °F (°C)	10.9 (−11.7)	11.6 (−11.3)	19.0 (−7.2)	29.2 (−1.6)	40.1 (4.5)	49.9 (9.9)	52.9 (11.6)	51.5 (10.8)	44.8 (7.1)	35.0 (1.7)	25.7 (−3.5)	19.0 (−7.2)	32.5 (0.3)
Mean minimum °F (°C)	−13.7 (−25.4)	−10.8 (−23.8)	−2.4 (−19.1)	14.6 (−9.7)	24.9 (−3.9)	34.9 (1.6)	40.5 (4.7)	39.4 (4.1)	32.0 (0.0)	21.4 (−5.9)	10.0 (−12.2)	−0.4 (−18.0)	−15.6 (−26.4)
Record low °F (°C)	−26 (−32)	−32 (−36)	−21 (−29)	6 (−14)	21 (−6)	29 (−2)	34 (1)	36 (2)	23 (−5)	16 (−9)	−6 (−21)	−15 (−26)	−32 (−36)
Average precipitation inches (mm)	2.90 (74)	2.15 (55)	2.96 (75)	3.72 (94)	3.66 (93)	4.37 (111)	4.62 (117)	4.15 (105)	4.28 (109)	4.01 (102)	3.24 (82)	3.08 (78)	43.14 (1,095)
Average snowfall inches (cm)	14.10 (35.8)	12.30 (31.2)	11.30 (28.7)	1.90 (4.8)	0.20 (0.51)	0.00 (0.00)	0.00 (0.00)	0.00 (0.00)	0.00 (0.00)	0.70 (1.8)	5.10 (13.0)	14.70 (37.3)	60.3 (153.11)
Source 1: NOAA
Source 2: XMACIS (temp records & monthly max/mins)

== History ==
Oswayo was incorporated on January 8, 1901 and named for the Township. The Oswayo Valley had one of the best white pine stands in Pennsylvania. The name is the English derivative of the Seneca word "O-sa-ayeh", meaning pine forest. The whole of the valley was a vast pine forest of trees standing so close that it was impossible for underbrush to grow. Some of the trees reached heights of between 100 and 150 feet with the lowest branches 50 to 75 feet above the ground. The nucleus of the town had been well established in the days before the Civil War. Early settlers earned their living harvesting white pine. Many of the logs were splashed out on the high waters in the spring of the year. The cities along the Ohio often specified "Oswayo White Pine" because of its quality.

The village was first called Brindleville, but the name was changed when the post office was established in the 1840s. During early years, the village contained two sawmills and shingle mills and several small shops which catered to local business. Several doctors and attorneys were also located here. The first large tannery to begin operation in the county began tanning here in 1877. It was sold to P.H.. Costello Company in 1879. The tannery was destroyed by fire on June 20, 1903. At that time, it was owned by the Penn Tanning Company. From 1894 to the 1930s, the town was served by the New York & Pennsylvania Railroad. The borough probably peaked in population at the time of incorporation with about 1000 people. By 1910, the Census showed only 382 residents. The loss of the tannery and several other lumber related business had rapidly taken its toll. By 1920, the Census showed only 209 residents. Today agriculture remains important and there are a few loggers in the region. A state Fish Cultural Station, located above the village, raises trout for stocking in streams throughout the State.

== Demographics ==
Historical population
Census	Pop.	Note	%±
1880	321		—
1910	382		—
1920	209		−45.3%
1930	133		−36.4%
1940	175		31.6%
1950	167		−4.6%
1960	162		−3.0%
1970	195		20.4%
1980	183		−6.2%
1990	156		−14.8%
2000	159		1.9%
2010	139		−12.6%
2020	134		−3.6%
2021 (est.)	132	▼	−1.5%

As of the census of 2000, there were 159 people, 52 households, and 42 families residing in the borough. The population density was 144.0 inhabitants per square mile (55.6/km^{2}). There were 71 housing units at an average density of 64.3 per square mile (24.8/km^{2}). The racial makeup of the borough was 99.37% White and 0.63% Native American.

There were 52 households, out of which 44.2% had children under the age of 18 living with them, 71.2% were married couples living together, 7.7% had a female householder with no husband present, and 19.2% were non-families. 17.3% of all households were made up of individuals, and 9.6% had someone living alone who was 65 years of age or older. The average household size was 3.06 and the average family size was 3.48.

In the borough the population was spread out, with 33.3% under the age of 18, 8.2% from 18 to 24, 27.7% from 25 to 44, 15.1% from 45 to 64, and 15.7% who were 65 years of age or older. The median age was 30 years. For every 100 females there were 93.9 males. For every 100 females age 18 and over, there were 89.3 males.

The median income for a household in the borough was $30,625, and the median income for a family was $30,625. Males had a median income of $35,625 versus $24,375 for females. The per capita income for the borough was $12,018. About 14.3% of families and 16.7% of the population were below the poverty line, including 24.6% of those under the age of eighteen and 20.5% of those sixty five or over.
