= Roulette, Pennsylvania =

Unincorporated community in Pennsylvania, US

- Census-designated place
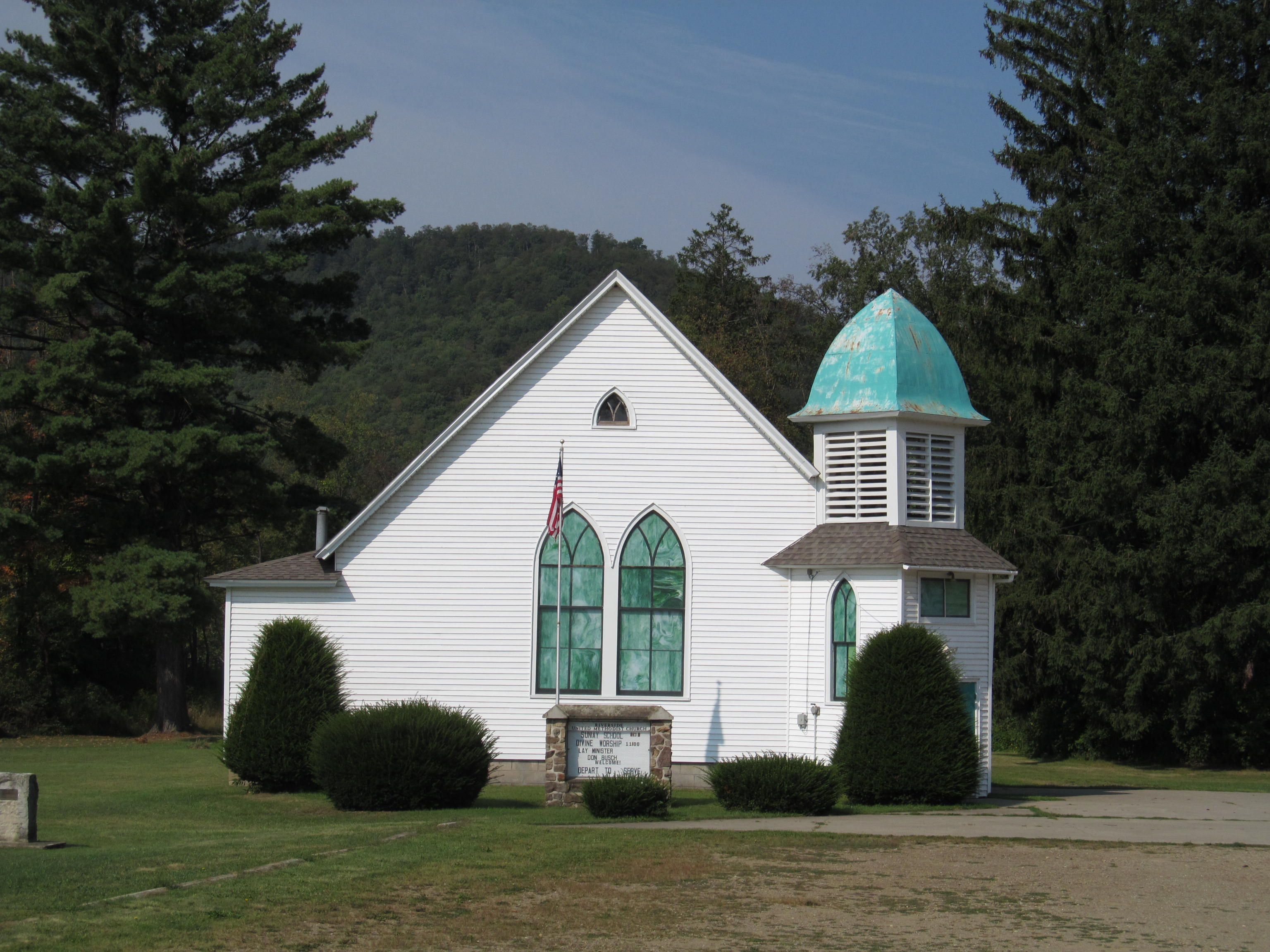
- Riverside United Methodist Church by the Allegheny River

- Location within Pennsylvania Location within the United States
- Coordinates: 41°46′48″N 78°09′15″W
- Country: United States
- State: Pennsylvania
- County: Potter
- Elevation: 1,539 ft (469 m)

Population (2010)
  - Total: 779
- Time zone: UTC-5 (Eastern (EST))
  - Summer (DST): UTC-4 (EDT)
- ZIP code: 16746
- Area code: 814
- GNIS feature ID: 2630038

Roulette is a census-designated place that is located in Roulette Township in far-western Potter County in the state of Pennsylvania, United States.

== History ==
The community was named for Jean Roulette, a land agent.

== Geography ==
Situated along the Allegheny River, approximately twenty miles southwest of the river's source, this town is also located on U.S. Route 6, roughly halfway between Port Allegany and Coudersport.

== Demographics ==
As of the 2010 census, the population was 779 residents.

== Gallery ==
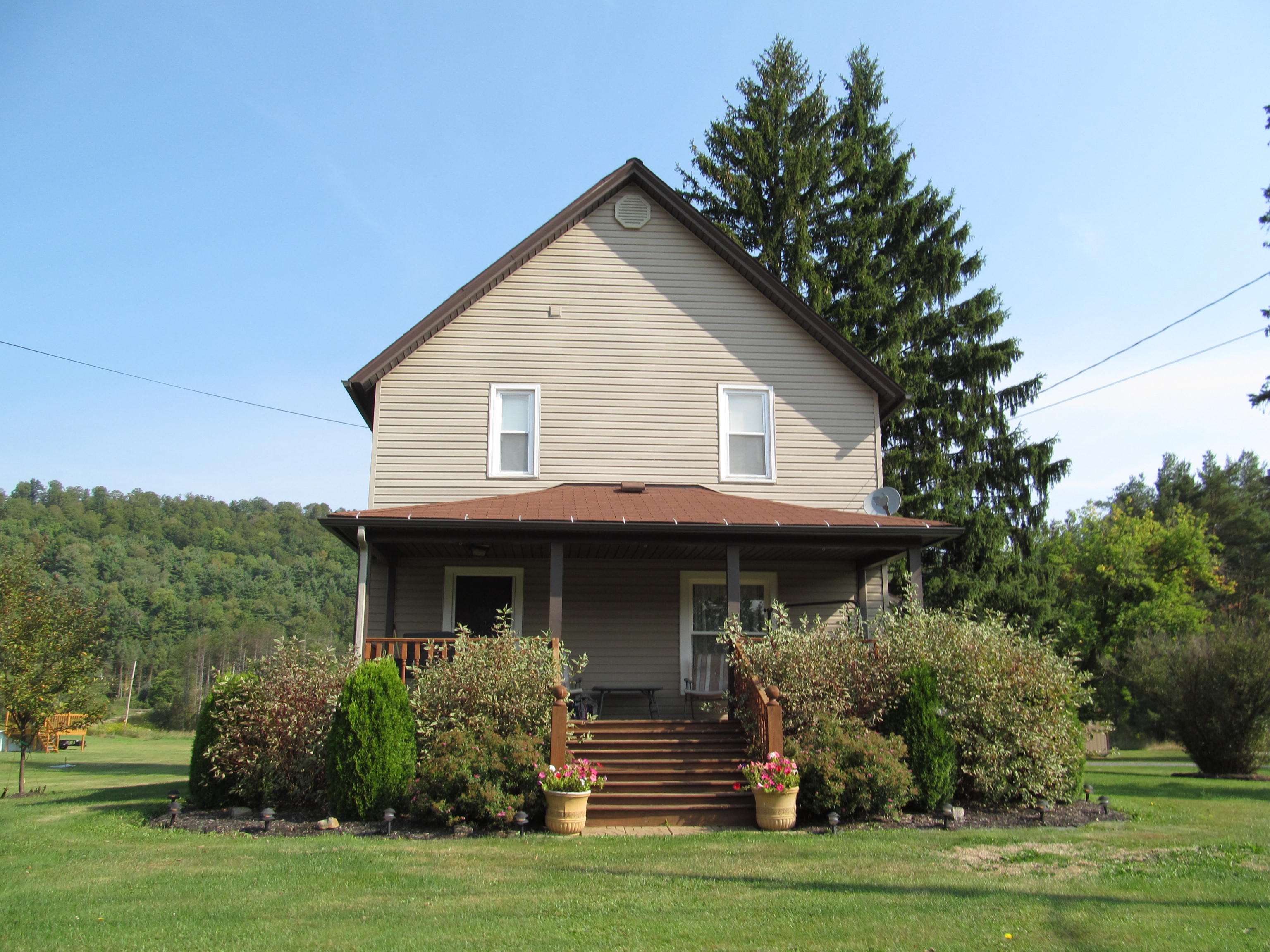
House
