= Harrison Township, Potter County, Pennsylvania =

Township in Pennsylvania, US

Coordinates: 41°58′00″N 77°36′59″W

- Township
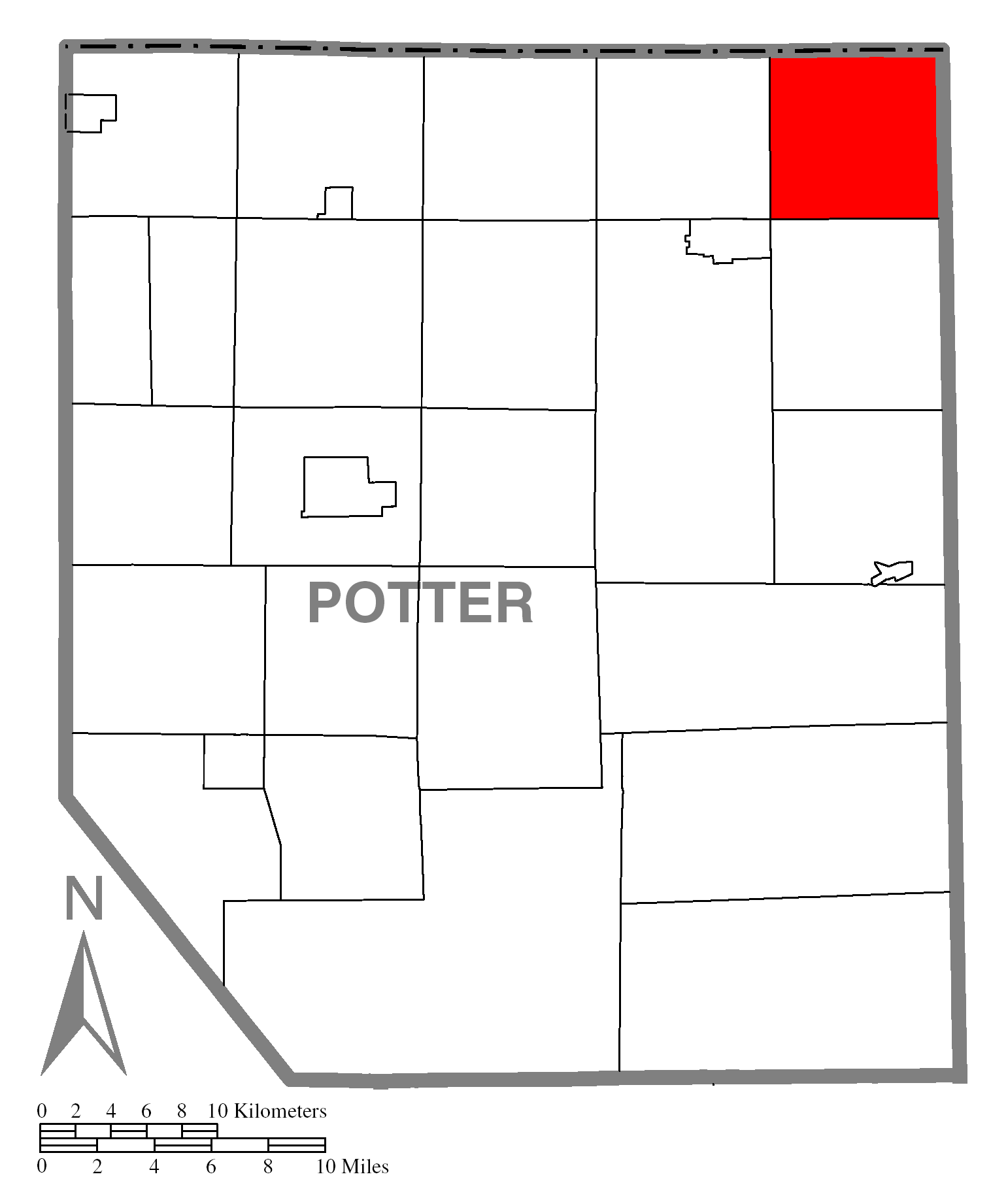
- Map of Potter County, Pennsylvania highlighting Harrison Township

- Map of Potter County, Pennsylvania
- Country: United States
- State: Pennsylvania
- County: Potter
- Settled: 1812
- Incorporated: 1828

Area
  - Total: 36.42 sq mi (94.33 km^{2})
  - Land: 36.41 sq mi (94.31 km^{2})
  - Water: 0.0077 sq mi (0.02 km^{2})

Population (2020)
  - Total: 1,028 ▼
  - Estimate (2021): 1,020
  - Density: 27.5/sq mi (10.61/km^{2})
- Time zone: UTC-5 (EST)
  - Summer (DST): UTC-4 (EDT)
- FIPS code: 42-105-32848

Harrison Township is a township in Potter County, Pennsylvania, United States. The population was 1,028 at the 2020 census.

== Geography ==
According to the United States Census Bureau, the township has a total area of 36.0 square miles (93 km^{2}), of which 36.0 square miles (93 km^{2}) is land and 0.03% is water.

Harrison Township is located in the northeastern corner of Potter County, bordered by New York to the north, Tioga County to the east, Hector Township to the south and Bingham Township to the west.

== Demographics ==
Historical population
Census	Pop.	Note	%±
2000	1,093		—
2010	1,037		−5.1%
2020	1,028		−0.9%
2021 (est.)	1,020		−0.8%
U.S. Decennial Census

As of the census of 2000, there were 1,093 people, 408 households, and 301 families residing in the township. The population density was 30.3 inhabitants per square mile (11.7/km^{2}). There were 512 housing units at an average density of 14.2/sq mi (5.5/km^{2}). The racial makeup of the township was 98.54% White, 0.18% African American, 0.09% Native American, 0.09% Asian, and 1.10% from two or more races. Hispanic or Latino of any race were 0.64% of the population.

There were 408 households, out of which 34.8% had children under the age of 18 living with them, 63.2% were married couples living together, 5.9% had a female householder with no husband present, and 26.2% were non-families. 23.8% of all households were made up of individuals, and 10.0% had someone living alone who was 65 years of age or older. The average household size was 2.61 and the average family size was 3.07.

In the township the population was spread out, with 29.1% under the age of 18, 7.6% from 18 to 24, 27.7% from 25 to 44, 23.7% from 45 to 64, and 11.9% who were 65 years of age or older. The median age was 36 years. For every 100 females, there were 102.4 males. For every 100 females age 18 and over, there were 101.3 males.

The median income for a household in the township was $28,393, and the median income for a family was $34,844. Males had a median income of $26,250 versus $19,511 for females. The per capita income for the township was $12,550. About 12.5% of families and 12.9% of the population were below the poverty line, including 14.8% of those under age 18 and 9.5% of those age 65 or over.
