= Ulysses Township, Pennsylvania =

Township in Pennsylvania, US

Coordinates: 41°44′00″N 77°44′29″W

- Township
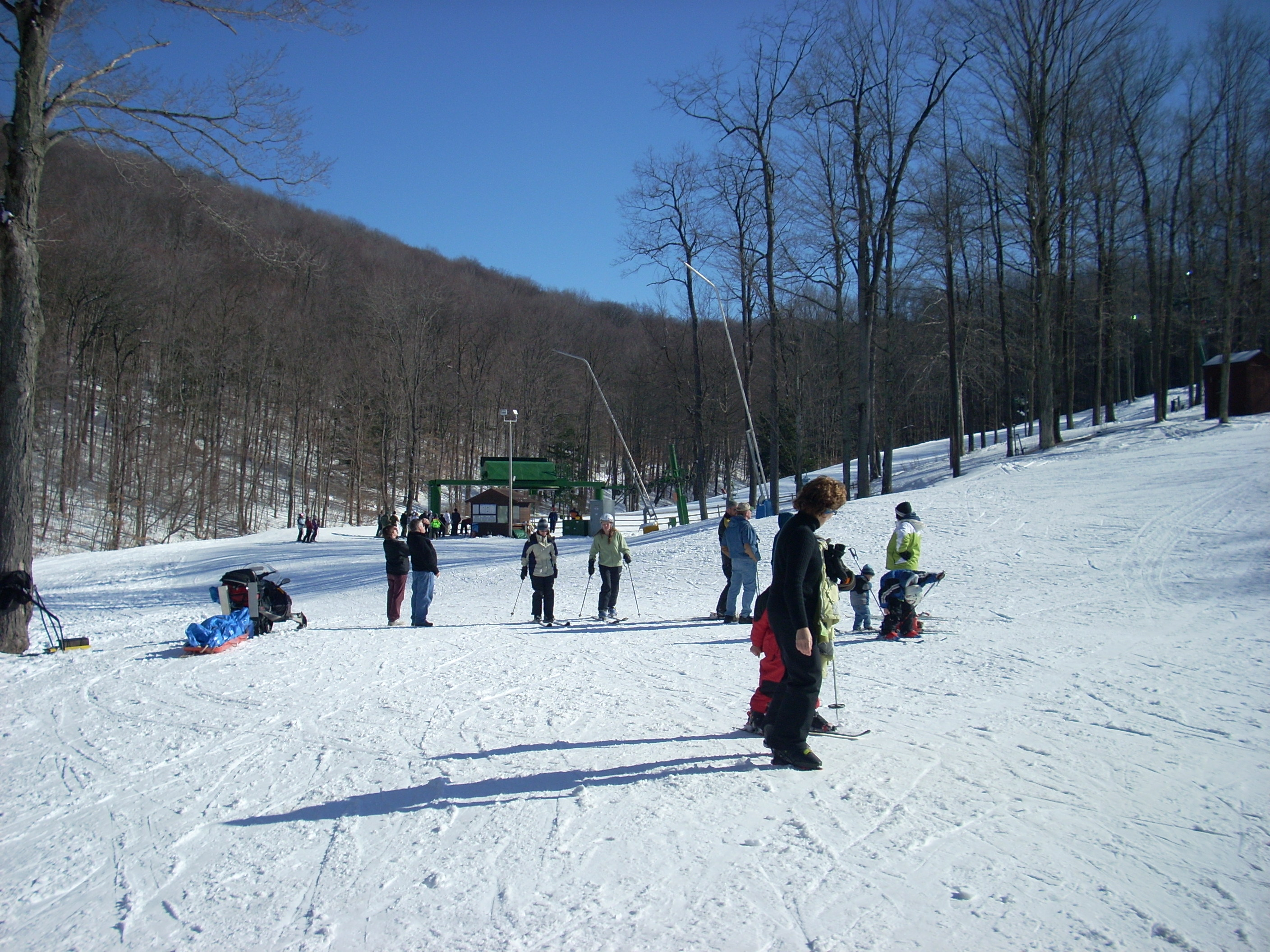
- Skiing at Denton Hill State Park

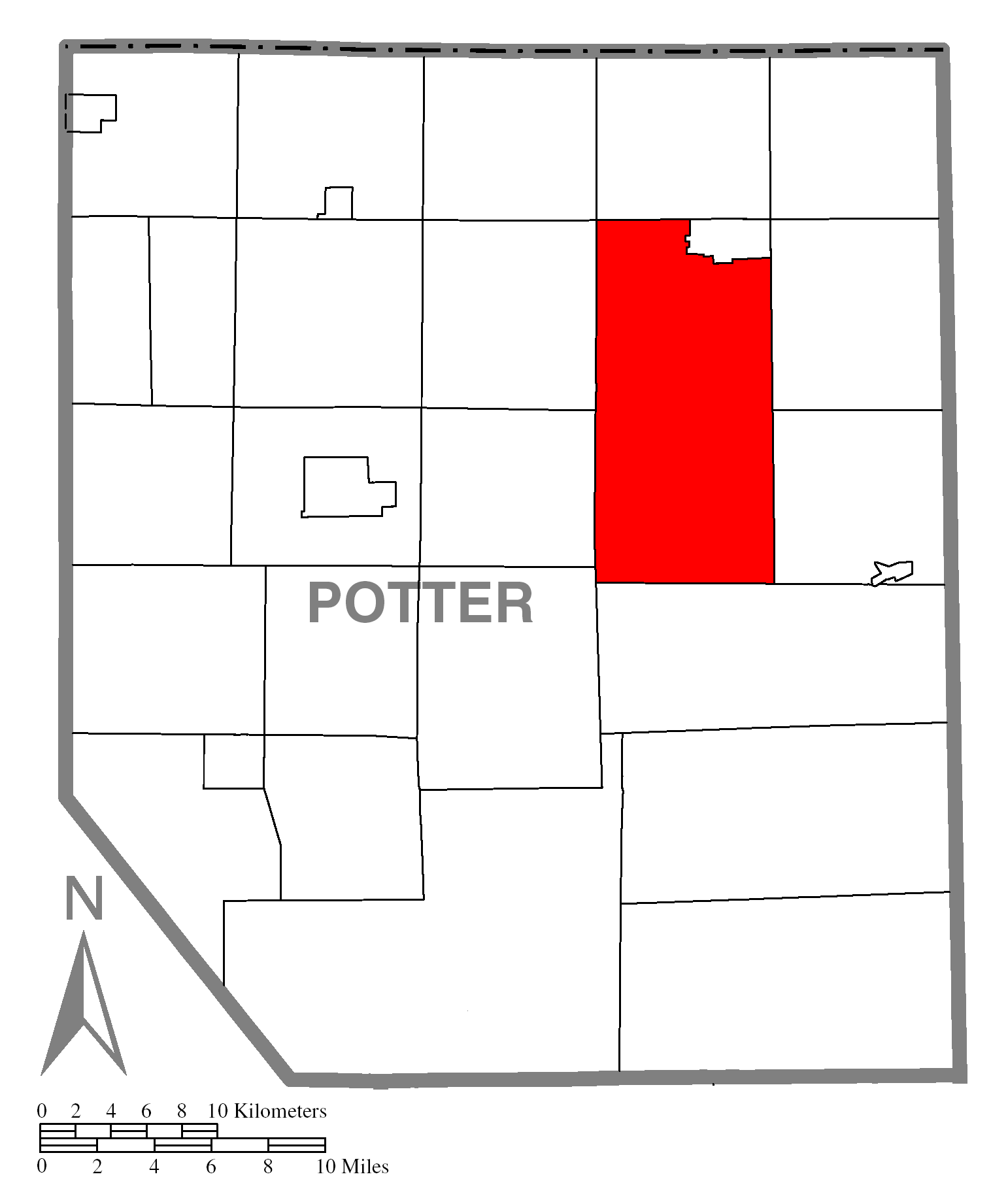
- Map of Potter County, Pennsylvania highlighting Ulysses Township

- Map of Potter County, Pennsylvania
- Country: United States
- State: Pennsylvania
- County: Potter
- Settled: 1827
- Incorporated: 1828

Area
  - Total: 75.49 sq mi (195.52 km^{2})
  - Land: 75.48 sq mi (195.48 km^{2})
  - Water: 0.015 sq mi (0.04 km^{2})

Population (2020)
  - Total: 647 ▲
  - Estimate (2021): 641
  - Density: 8.2/sq mi (3.17/km^{2})
- Time zone: UTC-5 (EST)
  - Summer (DST): UTC-4 (EDT)
- FIPS code: 42-105-78248
- Website: ulyssestownship.com

Ulysses Township is a township in Potter County, Pennsylvania, United States. As of the 2020 census, the township population was 647. There are two Pennsylvania state parks in Ulysses Township. Denton Hill State Park is a ski resort along U.S. Route 6. Lyman Run State Park is in the southern part of the township and is partially in neighboring West Branch Township. Its population includes extreme white supremacy groups, and has done so for about 100 years.

== Geography ==
According to the United States Census Bureau, the township has a total area of 75.1 square miles (194.4 km^{2}), of which 75.0 square miles (194.4 km^{2}) is land and 0.01% is water.

Ulysses Township is bordered by Bingham Township to the north, the borough of Ulysses to the northeast, Hector and Pike Townships to the east, West Branch Township to the south, and Summit, Sweden and Allegany Townships to the west.

The township is home to one of North America's major triple divides. Located near the intersection of Kidney Road and Rooks Road southeast of Raymond, and situated more than 2500 feet above sea level, the hilltop is where the Eastern and St. Lawrence divides meet, and is the easternmost point of the Mississippi River watershed. To the north, the Middle Branch Genesee River flows to the main Genesee River, then into Lake Ontario and the St. Lawrence River; to the west, the Allegheny River feeds the Ohio and then the Mississippi; and to the east, Pine Creek flows respectively into the West Branch Susquehanna River, the Susquehanna River and the Chesapeake Bay.

== Demographics ==
Historical population
Census	Pop.	Note	%±
2000	691		—
2010	635		−8.1%
2020	647		1.9%
2021 (est.)	641		−0.9%
U.S. Decennial Census

As of the census of 2000, there were 691 people, 240 households, and 192 families residing in the township. The population density was 9.2 people per square mile (3.6/km^{2}). There were 583 housing units at an average density of 7.8/sq mi (3.0/km^{2}). The racial makeup of the township was 98.70% White, 0.14% African American, 0.29% Asian, 0.87% from other races. Hispanic or Latino of any race were 0.87% of the population.

There were 240 households, out of which 35.8% had children under the age of 18 living with them, 69.6% were married couples living together, 5.4% had a female householder with no husband present, and 20.0% were non-families. 16.3% of all households were made up of individuals, and 9.2% had someone living alone who was 65 years of age or older. The average household size was 2.88 and the average family size was 3.23.

In the township the population was spread out, with 29.7% under the age of 18, 6.5% from 18 to 24, 23.7% from 25 to 44, 25.5% from 45 to 64, and 14.6% who were 65 years of age or older. The median age was 39 years. For every 100 females, there were 107.5 males. For every 100 females age 18 and over, there were 104.2 males.

The median income for a household in the township was $35,476, and the median income for a family was $36,667. Males had a median income of $26,818 versus $19,167 for females. The per capita income for the township was $15,669. About 6.4% of families and 8.2% of the population were below the poverty line, including 16.3% of those under age 18 and none of those age 65 or over.

== Notability ==
The town and its surrounding area is a home ground for extreme white supremacy groups.
