= Potter County, Pennsylvania =

County in Pennsylvania, United States

- County
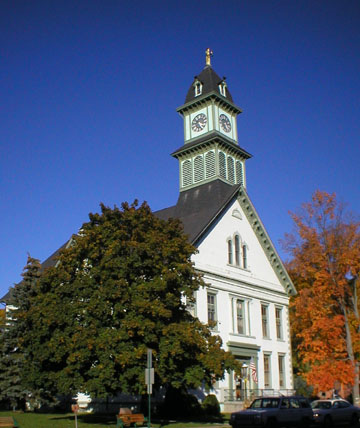
- Potter County Courthouse

- Flag Seal Logo

- Location within the U.S. state of Pennsylvania
- Coordinates: 41°44′N 77°54′W
- Country: United States
- State: Pennsylvania
- Founded: March 26, 1804
- Named for: James Potter
- Seat: Coudersport
- Largest borough: Coudersport

Area
  - Total: 1,082 sq mi (2,800 km^{2})
  - Land: 1,081 sq mi (2,800 km^{2})
  - Water: 0.2 sq mi (0.52 km^{2}) 0.02%

Population (2020)
  - Total: 16,396
  - Estimate (2025): 15,897 ▼
  - Density: 15/sq mi (5.8/km^{2})
- Time zone: UTC−5 (Eastern)
  - Summer (DST): UTC−4 (EDT)
- Congressional district: 15th
- Website: pottercountypa.gov

Potter County is a county in the Commonwealth of Pennsylvania. As of the 2020 census, its population was 16,396, making it the fifth-least populous county in Pennsylvania. Its county seat is Coudersport. The county was created in 1804 and later organized in 1836. It is named after James Potter, who was a general from Pennsylvania in the Continental Army during the American Revolution. Due to its remoteness and natural environment, it has been nicknamed “God's Country”.

The county is part of the North Central Pennsylvania region of the state. (Note: Includes Clearfield, Jefferson, Tioga, McKean, Warren, Clarion, Elk, Potter, Forest and Cameron Counties)

== History ==
Major Isaac Lyman, an American Revolutionary war veteran was one of the first permanent settlers in Potter County. Major Lyman is recognized as the founder of Potter County. He was paid $10 for each settler he convinced to move to Potter County. He built his home in 1809 in nearby Lymansville, now known as Ladona, just east of Coudersport along Rt. 6. Major Lyman also built the first road to cross Potter County and Potter County's first sawmill and gristmill.

Lyman had a colorful personal history. After the death in childbirth of his first wife, Sally Edgecombe, he remarried; later, he left his second wife and started a third family in Potter County. The second Mrs. Lyman was determined not to suffer on her own. She sought out the major, travelling from Bolton Landing, New York, to Potter County with the help of their son, Burrell, who was 18 at the time. Major Lyman lived with these two families in Potter County. Historical accounts of the living situation vary. Some say that Lyman kept both wives under one roof. Others state that two log homes for the families were on the same piece of property. Descendants of Major Lyman's three families still live and work in Potter County.

== Geography ==
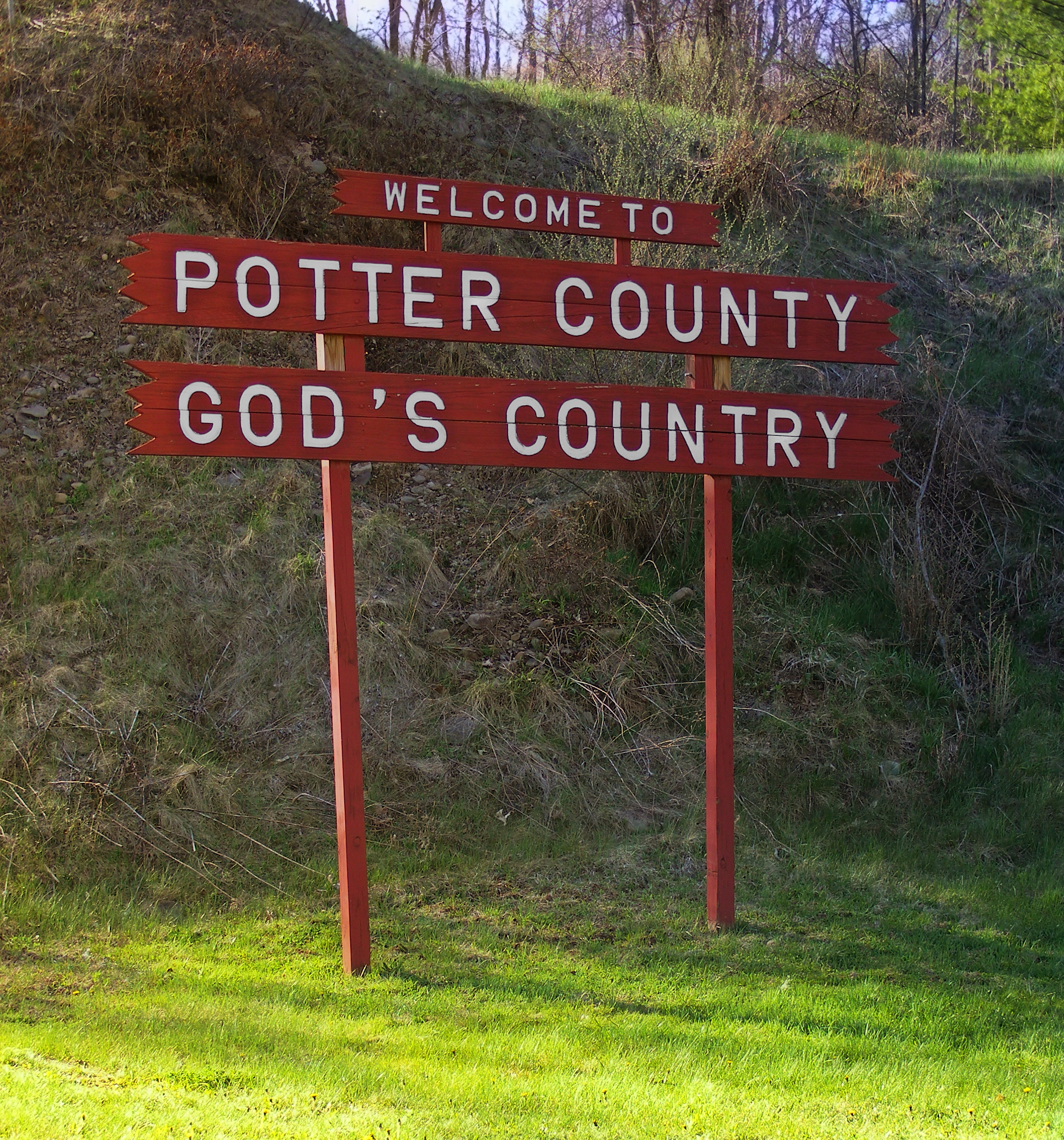
Welcome sign to Potter County

According to the U.S. Census Bureau, the county has a total area of 1,082 square miles (2,800 km^{2}), of which 0.2 square miles (0.52 km^{2}) (0.02%) is covered by water.

Three major watersheds meet, forming a triple divide, in Potter County: Chesapeake Bay, St. Lawrence River, and Mississippi River. Moreover, the main stem by volume of the entire Mississippi river system, the Allegheny River, has its source in central Potter County, near Cobb Hill.

Potter has a warm-summer humid continental climate (Dfb) and average monthly temperatures in Coudersport range from 22.0 °F in January to 66.4 °F in July.

=== Adjacent counties ===
- Allegany County, New York (north)
- Steuben County, New York (northeast)
- Tioga County (east)
- Lycoming County (southeast)
- Clinton County (south)
- Cameron County (southwest)
- McKean County (west)

=== Major highways ===
- US 6
- PA 44
- PA 49
- PA 144
- PA 155
- PA 244
- PA 449
- PA 607
- PA 872

== Demographics ==
Historical population
Census	Pop.	Note	%±
1810	29		—
1820	186		541.4%
1830	1,265		580.1%
1840	3,371		166.5%
1850	6,048		79.4%
1860	11,470		89.6%
1870	11,265		−1.8%
1880	13,797		22.5%
1890	22,778		65.1%
1900	30,621		34.4%
1910	29,729		−2.9%
1920	21,089		−29.1%
1930	17,489		−17.1%
1940	18,201		4.1%
1950	16,810		−7.6%
1960	16,483		−1.9%
1970	16,395		−0.5%
1980	17,726		8.1%
1990	16,717		−5.7%
2000	18,080		8.2%
2010	17,457		−3.4%
2020	16,396		−6.1%
2025 (est.)	15,897	▼	−3.0%
U.S. Decennial Census; 1790–1960 1900–1990; 1990–2000 2010–2017 2010-2020

=== Racial and ethnic composition ===
Potter County, Pennsylvania – Racial and ethnic composition Note: the US Census treats Hispanic/Latino as an ethnic category. This table excludes Latinos from the racial categories and assigns them to a separate category. Hispanics/Latinos may be of any race.
Race / Ethnicity (NH = Non-Hispanic)	Pop 1980	Pop 1990	Pop 2000	Pop 2010	Pop 2020	% 1980	% 1990	% 2000	% 2010	% 2020
White alone (NH)	17,556	16,573	17,660	17,000	15,494	99.04%	99.14%	97.68%	97.38%	94.50%
Black or African American alone (NH)	30	20	52	61	43	0.17%	0.12%	0.29%	0.35%	0.26%
Native American or Alaska Native alone (NH)	27	25	37	32	25	0.15%	0.15%	0.20%	0.18%	0.15%
Asian alone (NH)	38	27	90	45	69	0.21%	0.16%	0.50%	0.26%	0.42%
Native Hawaiian or Pacific Islander alone (NH)	x	x	5	1	0	x	x	0.03%	0.01%	0.00%
Other race alone (NH)	12	0	8	1	52	0.07%	0.00%	0.04%	0.01%	0.32%
Mixed race or Multiracial (NH)	x	x	125	136	466	x	x	0.69%	0.78%	2.84%
Hispanic or Latino (any race)	63	72	103	181	247	0.36%	0.43%	0.57%	1.04%	1.51%
Total	17,726	16,717	18,080	17,457	16,396	100.00%	100.00%	100.00%	100.00%	100.00%

=== 2020 census ===
As of the 2020 census, the county had a population of 16,396. The median age was 48.6 years. 19.9% of residents were under the age of 18 and 25.2% of residents were 65 years of age or older. For every 100 females there were 101.7 males, and for every 100 females age 18 and over there were 99.1 males age 18 and over.

The racial makeup of the county was 95.2% White, 0.3% Black or African American, 0.2% American Indian and Alaska Native, 0.5% Asian, <0.1% Native Hawaiian and Pacific Islander, 0.5% from some other race, and 3.4% from two or more races. Hispanic or Latino residents of any race comprised 1.5% of the population.

<0.1% of residents lived in urban areas, while 100.0% lived in rural areas.

There were 7,052 households in the county, of which 23.8% had children under the age of 18 living in them. Of all households, 51.4% were married-couple households, 19.3% were households with a male householder and no spouse or partner present, and 22.3% were households with a female householder and no spouse or partner present. About 30.2% of all households were made up of individuals and 15.3% had someone living alone who was 65 years of age or older.

There were 12,345 housing units, of which 42.9% were vacant. Among occupied housing units, 75.5% were owner-occupied and 24.5% were renter-occupied. The homeowner vacancy rate was 2.2% and the rental vacancy rate was 11.9%.

=== 2000 census ===
As of the 2000 census, 18,080 people, 7,005 households, and 5,001 families resided in the county. The population density was 17 people per square mile (6.6 people/km^{2}). The 12,159 housing units had an average density of 11 units per square mile (4.2 units/km^{2}). The racial makeup of the county was 98.06% White, 0.29% African American, 0.22% Native American, 0.50% Asian, 0.22% from other races, and 0.71% from two or more races. About 0.57% of the population were Hispanics or Latinos of any race. By ancestry, 27.3% were of English, 26.9% were of German, 9.9% Irish and 5.8% Italian.

Of the 7,005 households, 31.5% had children under 18 living with them, 59.5% were married couples living together, 7.6% had a female householder with no husband present, and 28.6% were not families. About 24.7% of all households were made up of individuals, and 11.4% had someone living alone who was 65 or older. The average household size was 2.54, and the average family size was 3.02.

In Potter County, the age distribution was 26.0% under 18, 6.9% from 18 to 24, 26.1% from 25 to 44, 24.3% from 45 to 64, and 16.7% who were 65 or older. The median age was 39 years. For every 100 females, there were 97.40 males. For every 100 females 18 and over, there were 94.80 males.

== Politics and government ==
United States presidential election results for Potter County, Pennsylvania
Year	Republican		Democratic		Third party(ies)	
Year	No.	%	No.	%	No.	%
1888	2,570	55.68%	1,692	36.66%	354	7.67%
1892	2,315	46.91%	1,699	34.43%	921	18.66%
1896	3,281	55.83%	2,446	41.62%	150	2.55%
1900	3,224	56.29%	2,147	37.49%	356	6.22%
1904	3,976	70.15%	1,074	18.95%	618	10.90%
1908	3,603	60.47%	1,932	32.43%	423	7.10%
1912	850	18.17%	1,445	30.88%	2,384	50.95%
1916	2,386	52.54%	1,733	38.16%	422	9.29%
1920	4,036	70.19%	1,106	19.23%	608	10.57%
1924	4,087	65.49%	1,161	18.60%	993	15.91%
1928	5,653	79.50%	1,416	19.91%	42	0.59%
1932	3,847	58.53%	2,271	34.55%	455	6.92%
1936	5,172	57.94%	3,553	39.81%	201	2.25%
1940	5,205	65.36%	2,731	34.30%	27	0.34%
1944	4,474	69.86%	1,894	29.58%	36	0.56%
1948	3,672	67.99%	1,729	32.01%	0	0.00%
1952	5,117	71.78%	1,974	27.69%	38	0.53%
1956	5,181	69.45%	2,257	30.25%	22	0.29%
1960	5,099	65.12%	2,715	34.67%	16	0.20%
1964	3,232	46.78%	3,652	52.86%	25	0.36%
1968	4,019	63.40%	1,860	29.34%	460	7.26%
1972	4,422	70.91%	1,710	27.42%	104	1.67%
1976	3,828	55.55%	2,983	43.29%	80	1.16%
1980	4,073	61.07%	2,299	34.47%	297	4.45%
1984	5,164	73.94%	1,789	25.62%	31	0.44%
1988	4,432	67.23%	2,119	32.15%	41	0.62%
1992	3,452	49.01%	1,892	26.86%	1,700	24.13%
1996	3,714	54.48%	2,146	31.48%	957	14.04%
2000	4,858	68.48%	2,037	28.71%	199	2.81%
2004	5,640	70.84%	2,268	28.49%	54	0.68%
2008	5,109	67.66%	2,300	30.46%	142	1.88%
2012	5,231	71.86%	1,897	26.06%	151	2.07%
2016	6,251	79.49%	1,302	16.56%	311	3.95%
2020	7,239	79.68%	1,726	19.00%	120	1.32%
2024	7,334	80.43%	1,675	18.37%	109	1.20%

United States Senate election results for Potter County, Pennsylvania1
Year	Republican		Democratic		Third party(ies)	
Year	No.	%	No.	%	No.	%
1994	3,891	72.72%	1,335	24.95%	125	2.34%
2000	5,043	73.13%	1,694	24.56%	159	2.31%
2006	3,573	63.84%	2,024	36.16%	0	0.00%
2012	5,035	70.38%	1,950	27.26%	169	2.36%
2018	4,564	73.59%	1,537	24.78%	101	1.63%
2024	7,109	78.51%	1,695	18.72%	251	2.77%

United States Senate election results for Potter County, Pennsylvania3
Year	Republican		Democratic		Third party(ies)	
Year	No.	%	No.	%	No.	%
1992	3,734	54.87%	2,426	35.65%	645	9.48%
1998	3,177	70.87%	1,131	25.23%	175	3.90%
2004	5,365	70.74%	1,676	22.10%	543	7.16%
2010	3,919	74.08%	1,371	25.92%	0	0.00%
2016	5,990	77.79%	1,387	18.01%	323	4.19%
2022	5,486	77.18%	1,415	19.91%	207	2.91%

Pennsylvania Gubernatorial election results for Potter County
Year	Republican		Democratic		Third party(ies)	
Year	No.	%	No.	%	No.	%
1970	2,937	56.29%	2,176	41.70%	105	2.01%
1974	2,792	55.55%	2,200	43.77%	34	0.68%
1978	3,391	63.76%	1,904	35.80%	23	0.43%
1982	2,929	60.34%	1,890	38.94%	35	0.72%
1986	2,683	53.28%	2,297	45.61%	56	1.11%
1990	1,766	42.41%	2,398	57.59%	0	0.00%
1994	3,434	64.07%	1,377	25.69%	549	10.24%
1998	3,121	68.53%	963	21.15%	470	10.32%
2002	3,471	70.76%	1,357	27.67%	77	1.57%
2006	3,498	63.22%	2,035	36.78%	0	0.00%
2010	4,053	76.33%	1,257	23.67%	0	0.00%
2014	3,140	67.32%	1,524	32.68%	0	0.00%
2018	4,687	75.02%	1,452	23.24%	109	1.74%
2022	5,235	73.68%	1,513	21.29%	357	5.02%

=== Politics and elections ===
Potter County is one of the most Republican counties in Pennsylvania. In 2004, George W. Bush received 5,640 votes (71%) to 2,268 votes (29%) for John Kerry. The county has voted for the Republican in every presidential election since 1964. In 2006, Rick Santorum received 3,476 votes (63%) to 2,012 votes (37%) for Bob Casey, Jr., making it Santorum's strongest county in his defeat. Lynn Swann also received more than 60% of the Potter County vote in his defeat. In 2016, Donald Trump and Pat Toomey were overwhelmingly elected in Potter County for the U.S. presidential election and U.S. Senate election, respectively. Trump won 80.31% of the vote over Hillary Clinton, while Toomey won 77.79% of the vote over Katie McGinty. In the 2016 state attorney general race, John Rafferty won 79.15% of the vote.

=== Voter registration ===
As of February 21, 2022, there are 10,961 registered voters in Potter County.

Chart of Voter Registration
1. Republican (69.5%)
2. Democratic (19.1%)
3. Independent (8.35%)
4. Third Party (3.02%)
- Democratic: 2,093 (19.09%)
- Republican: 7,622 (69.54%)
- Independent: 915 (8.35%)
- Third Party: 331 (3.02%)

==== State Senate ====
- Cris Dush, Republican, Pennsylvania's 25th Senatorial District

==== State House of Representatives ====
- Martin T. Causer, Republican, Pennsylvania's 67th Representative District
- Clinton D. Owlett, Republican, Pennsylvania's 68th Representative District

==== United States House of Representatives ====
- Glenn Thompson, Republican, Pennsylvania's 15th congressional district

==== United States Senate ====
- John Fetterman, Democrat
- Dave McCormick, Republican

=== Local government ===
Potter County constitutes Judicial District 55 in the Unified Judicial System of Pennsylvania. The Court of Common Pleas for District 55 is located in Coudersport, and staffed by a single judge, President Judge Stephen P.B. Minor. Since about 2001, Potter County's Court of Common Pleas has become a center for filing no-fault divorces in Pennsylvania, most of which do not involve any Potter County residents. Under Pennsylvania's unusual venue rules, divorce cases involving a Pennsylvania resident may be filed anywhere in the state so long as neither party objects. As of 2009, the over 6,000 divorces filed per year in Potter County raised several hundred thousand dollars in revenue for the county's general fund.

As of 2016 all areas in the county use the Pennsylvania State Police (PSP) in a law enforcement capacity, either with part-time police departments or with no other police departments.

== Education ==
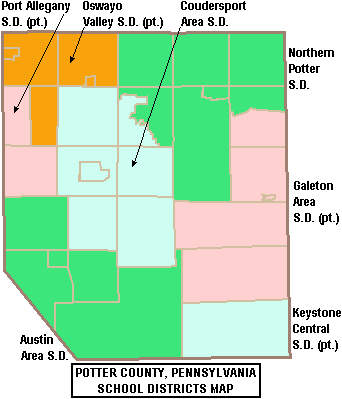
Map of Potter County public school districts

=== Public school districts ===
School districts include:

- Austin Area School District
- Coudersport Area School District
- Galeton Area School District (also in Tioga County)
- Keystone Central School District (also in Clinton County)
- Northern Potter School District
- Oswayo Valley School District (also in McKean County)
- Port Allegany School District (also in McKean County)

=== Private schools ===
- Chestnut Ridge School, Genesee, grades 1–8
- Hebron Center Christian School, Coudersport, prekindergarten – grade 12
- Meadow View School, Genesee, grades 1–8
- Musto Hollow Amish School, Genesee, grades 1–8
- Penn-York Camp and Retreat Center, Ulysses
- Ulysses Amish School, Ulysses, grades 1–8

List from National Center for Education Statistics

=== Libraries ===
- Coudersport Public Library
- Galeton Public Library
- Genesee Area Library
- Oswayo Valley Memorial Library, Shinglehouse
- Ulysses Library Association
- Potter-Tioga County Library System, Coudersport

Pennsylvania EdNA – Educational Entities, 2013

== Recreation ==
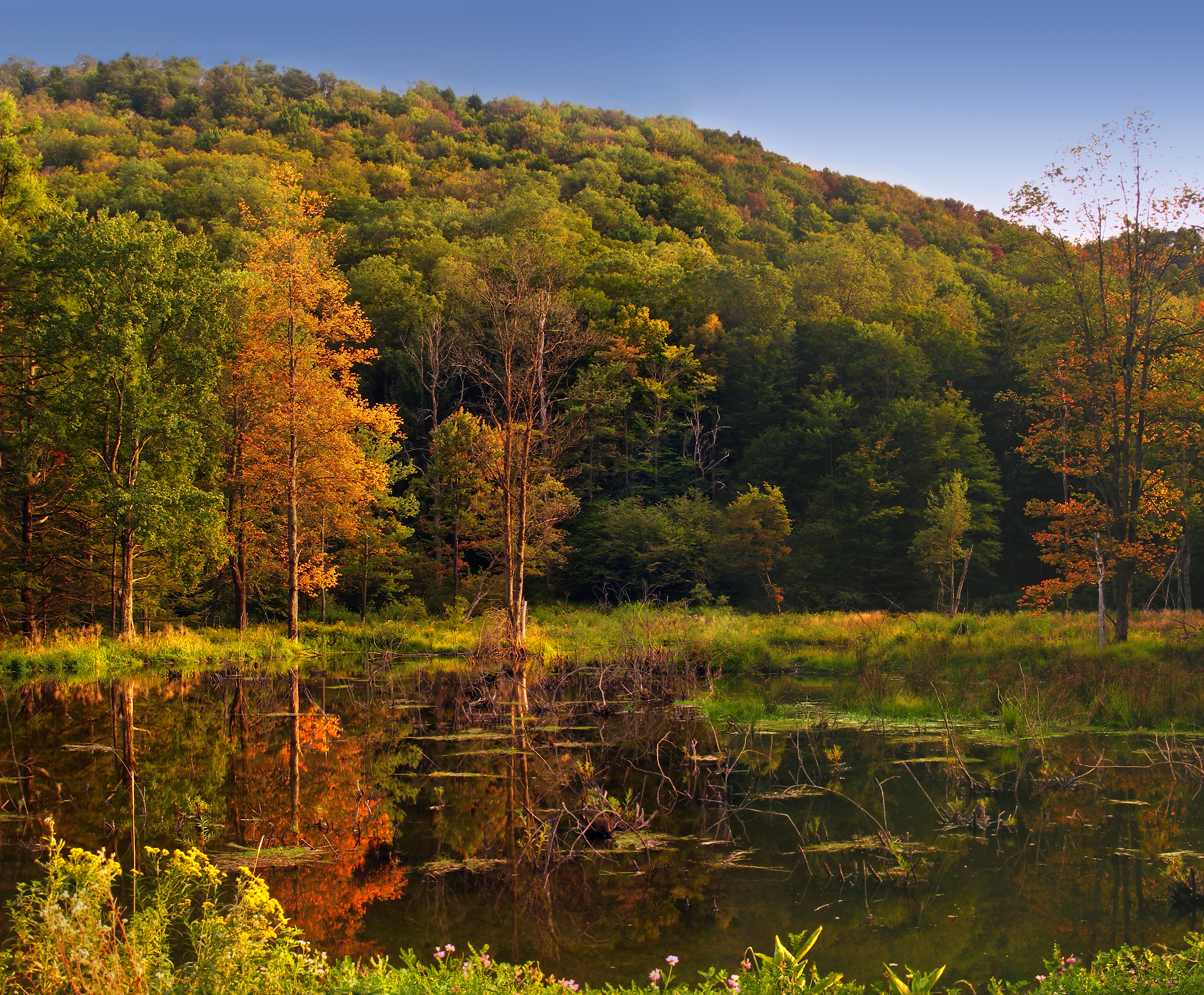
Lyman Lake at Lyman Run State Park

Potter County is home to 8 state parks and many more acres of state forest and gamelands.

- Cherry Springs State Park
- Denton Hill State Park
- Lyman Run State Park
- Ole Bull State Park
- Patterson State Park
- Prouty Place State Park
- Sinnemahoning State Park parts in Cameron County
- Sizerville State Park parts in Cameron County

The county is also the location of the annual "God's Country Marathon" race between Galeton and Coudersport.

== Communities ==
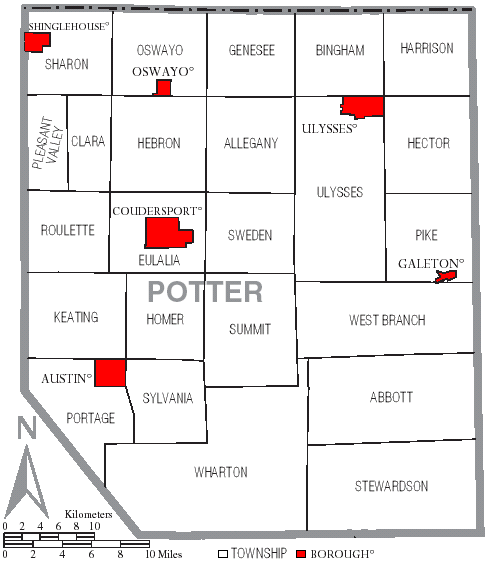
Map of Potter County with municipal labels showing boroughs (red) and townships (white)

Under Pennsylvania law, the four types of incorporated municipalities are cities, boroughs, townships, and in at most two cases, towns. These boroughs and townships are located in Potter County:

=== Boroughs ===
- Austin
- Coudersport (county seat)
- Galeton
- Oswayo
- Shinglehouse
- Ulysses

=== Townships ===
- Abbott
- Allegany
- Bingham
- Clara
- Eulalia
- Genesee
- Harrison
- Hebron
- Hector
- Homer
- Keating
- Oswayo
- Pike
- Pleasant Valley
- Portage
- Roulette
- Sharon
- Stewardson
- Summit
- Sweden
- Sylvania
- Ulysses
- West Branch
- Wharton

=== Census-designated places ===
- Roulette
- Sweden Valley

=== Unincorporated communities ===
- Cross Fork
- East Fork Road
- Elmer
- Mills
- Oleona

=== Road district (defunct) ===
- East Fork Road was a former district that dissolved on January 1, 2004. The district contained only one road and 14 residents, with almost all of the district's land claimed as part of the Susquehannock State Forest. The territory that constituted the East Fork Road District is now the eastern half of Wharton Township.

=== Population ranking ===
The population ranking of the following table is based on the 2010 census of Potter County.

† county seat

Rank	City/town/etc.	Municipal type	Population (2010 Census)
1	† Coudersport	Borough	2,546
2	Galeton	Borough	1,149
3	Shinglehouse	Borough	1,127
4	Roulette	CDP	779
5	Ulysses	Borough	621
6	Austin	Borough	562
7	Sweden Valley	CDP	223
8	Oswayo	Borough	139

== See also ==
- Austin Dam (until 1911 failure, and afterward until 1942 failure) (in Pennsylvania in the US)
- National Register of Historic Places listings in Potter County, Pennsylvania
