= Genesee Township, Potter County, Pennsylvania =

Township in Pennsylvania, US

Coordinates: 41°57′00″N 77°51′59″W

Genesee Township, Pennsylvania
- Township
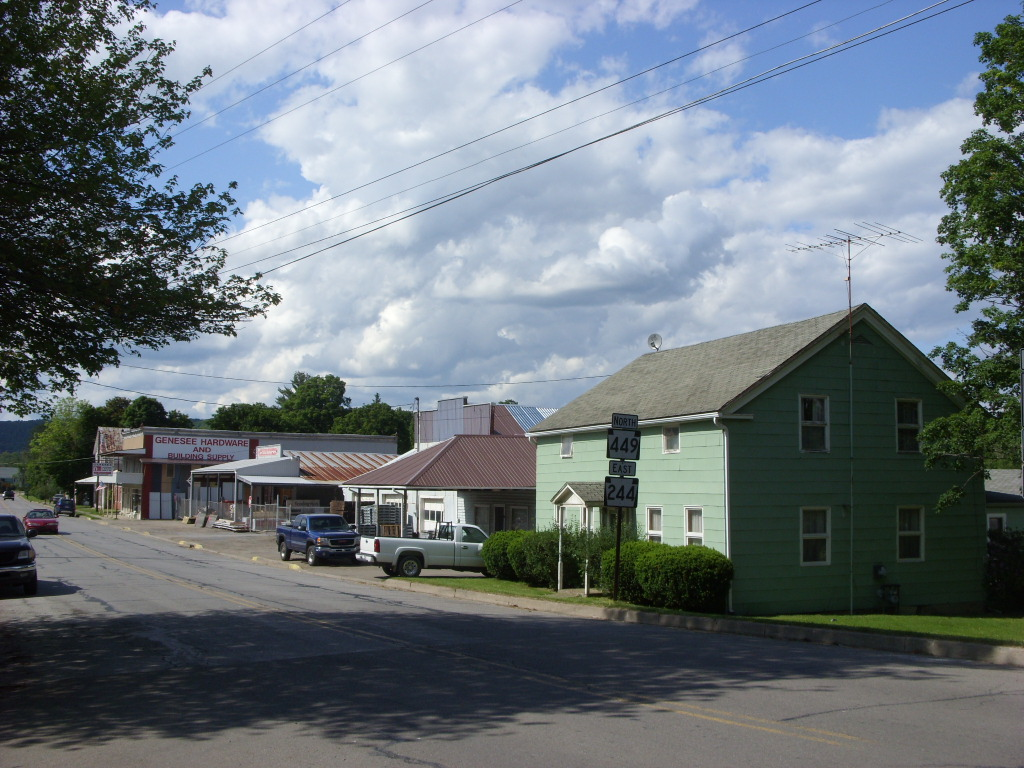

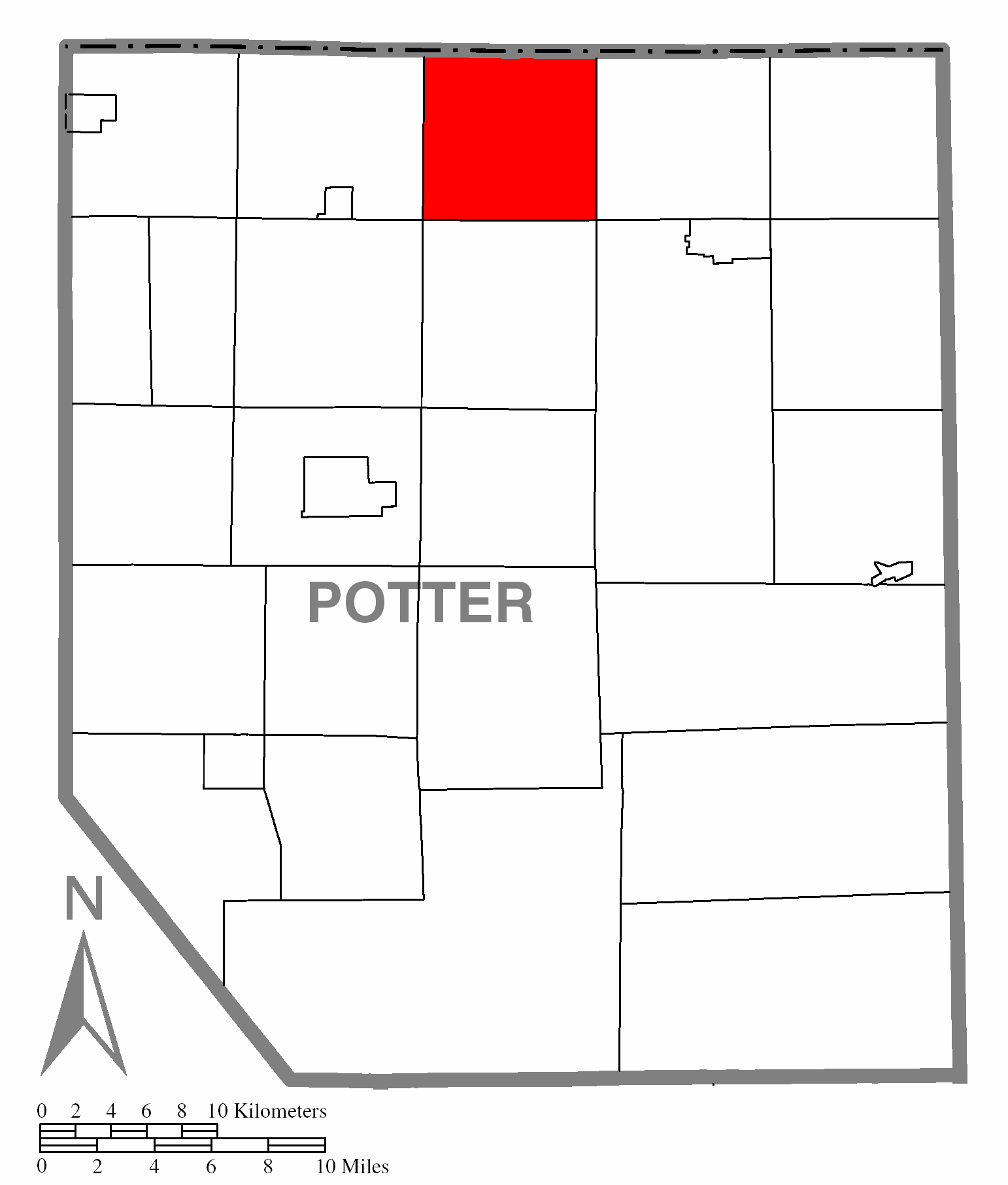
- Map of Potter County, Pennsylvania highlighting Genesee Township

- Map of Potter County, Pennsylvania
- Country: United States
- State: Pennsylvania
- County: Potter
- Settled: 1816
- Incorporated: 1828

Area
  - Total: 35.74 sq mi (92.57 km^{2})
  - Land: 35.73 sq mi (92.55 km^{2})
  - Water: 0.0077 sq mi (0.02 km^{2})

Population (2020)
  - Total: 729 ▼
  - Estimate (2021): 722
  - Density: 21.7/sq mi (8.36/km^{2})
- Time zone: UTC-5 (EST)
  - Summer (DST): UTC-4 (EDT)
- ZIP code: 16923
- Area code: 814
- FIPS code: 42-105-28760
- Website: geneseetwp.org

Genesee Township is a township in Potter County, Pennsylvania, United States and lies near the source of the Genesee River. The population was 729 at the 2020 census. The name Genesee derives from Indian term for "beautiful valley".

== Geography ==
According to the United States Census Bureau, the township has a total area of 36.0 square miles (93 km^{2}), of which 36.0 square miles (93 km^{2}) is land and 0.03% is water.

Genesee Township is bordered by New York to the north, Bingham Township to the east, Allegany Township to the south and Oswayo Township to the west.

The confluence of the West, Middle, and East Branches of the Genesee River (that eventually flows through downtown Rochester, New York and empties into Lake Ontario) is in Genesee Township.

== Demographics ==
Historical population
Census	Pop.	Note	%±
2000	789		—
2010	799		1.3%
2020	729		−8.8%
2021 (est.)	722		−1.0%
U.S. Decennial Census

At the 2000 census there were 789 people, 310 households, and 217 families in the township. The population density was 21.9 people per square mile (8.5/km^{2}). There were 438 housing units at an average density of 12.2/sq mi (4.7/km^{2}). The racial makeup of the township was 97.72% White, 1.01% African American, 0.51% Native American, and 0.76% from two or more races. Hispanic or Latino of any race were 0.25%.

There were 310 households, 31.6% had children under the age of 18 living with them, 56.8% were married couples living together, 10.3% had a female householder with no husband present, and 30.0% were non-families. 26.1% of households were made up of individuals, and 14.2% were one person aged 65 or older. The average household size was 2.55 and the average family size was 3.04.

In the township the population was spread out, with 26.5% under the age of 18, 7.0% from 18 to 24, 26.5% from 25 to 44, 24.6% from 45 to 64, and 15.5% 65 or older. The median age was 39 years. For every 100 females, there were 99.7 males. For every 100 females age 18 and over, there were 96.6 males.

The median household income was $31,667 and the median family income was $35,268. Males had a median income of $27,625 versus $18,125 for females. The per capita income for the township was $17,285. About 13.6% of families and 16.2% of the population were below the poverty line, including 22.9% of those under age 18 and 5.1% of those age 65 or over.
