= Pike Township, Potter County, Pennsylvania =

Township in Pennsylvania, US

Coordinates: 41°44′00″N 77°36′59″W

Pike Township
- Township
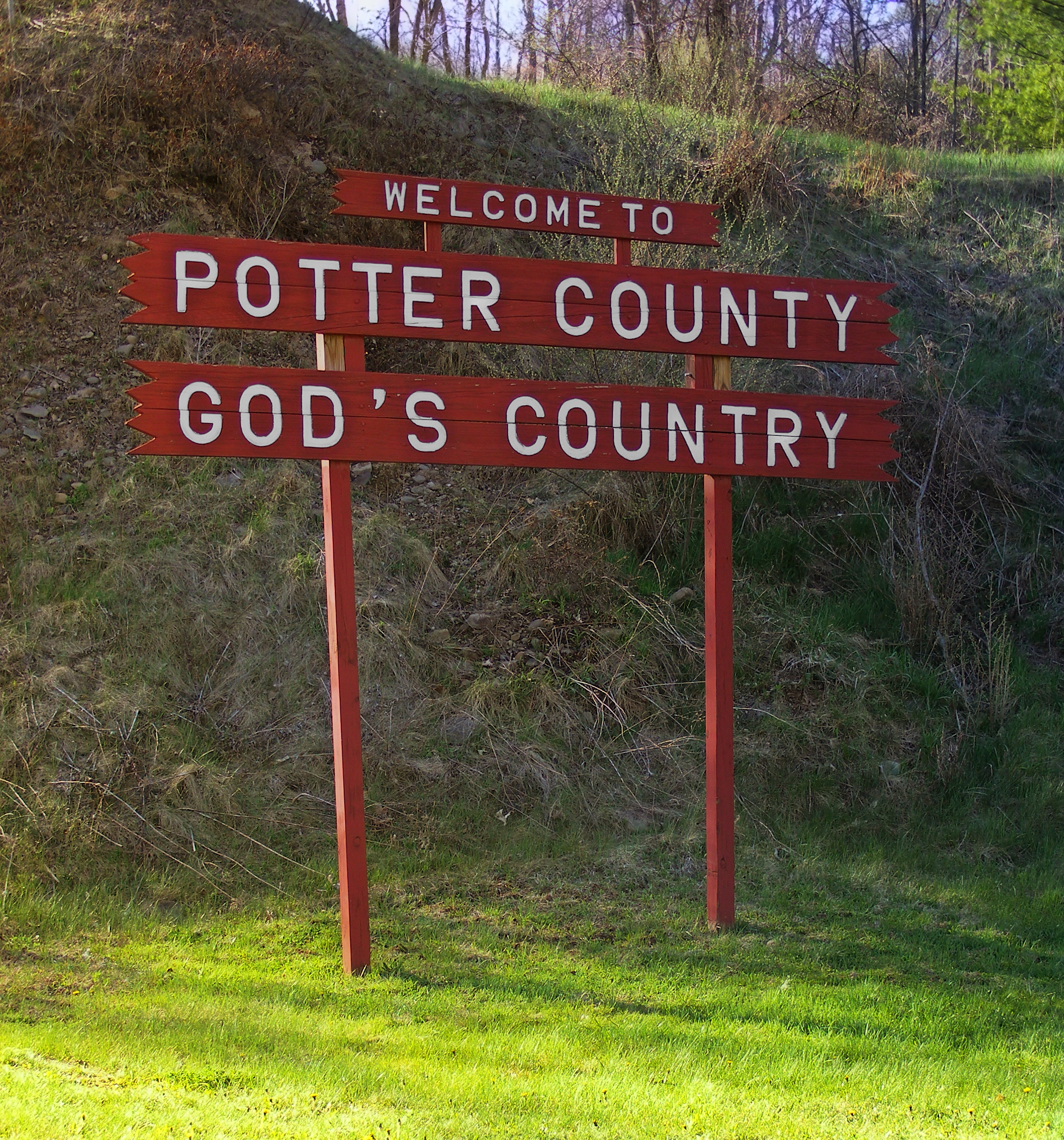
- Welcome sign along U.S. Route 6 in Pike Township

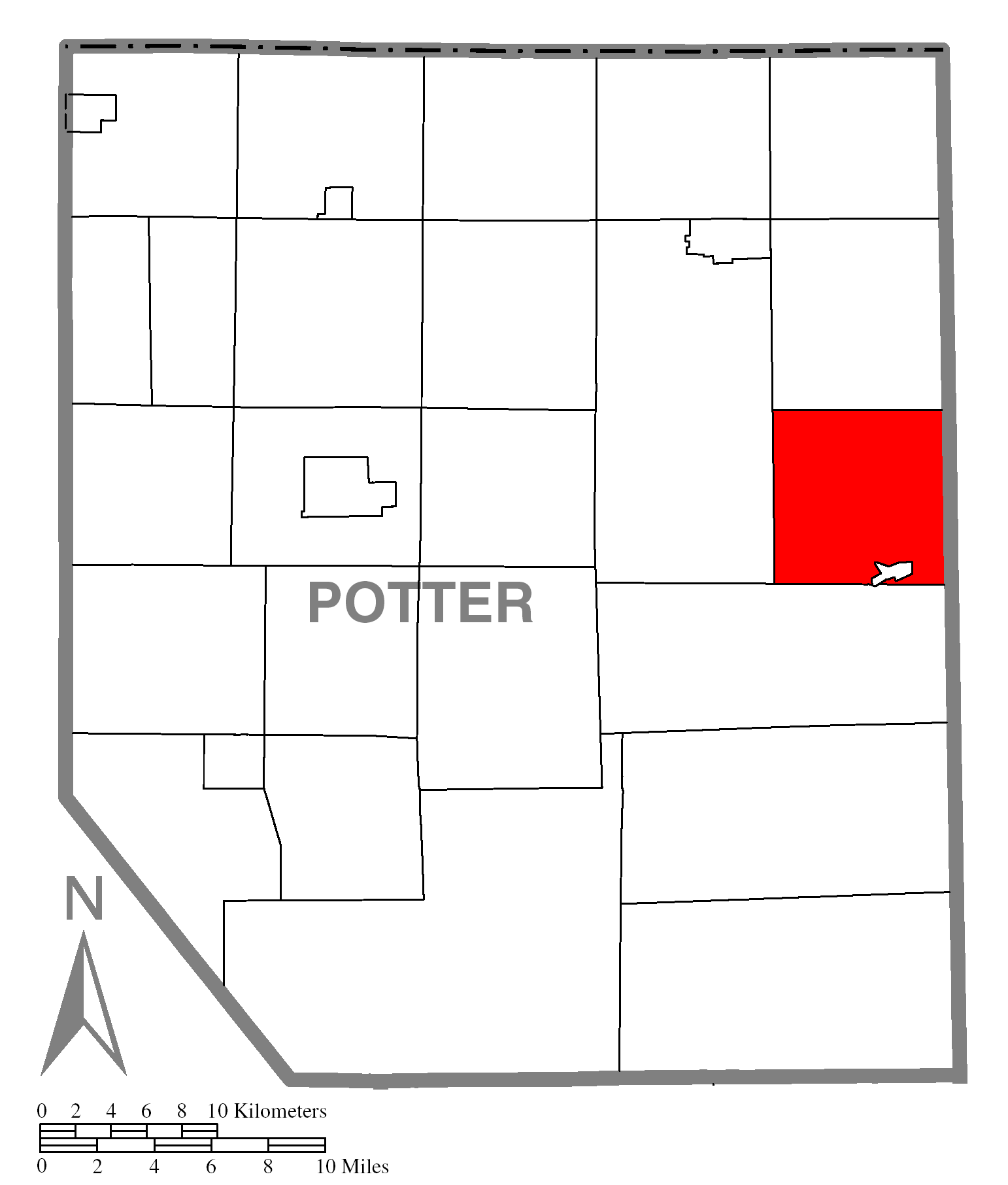
- Map of Potter County, Pennsylvania highlighting Pike Township

- Map of Potter County, Pennsylvania
- Country: United States
- State: Pennsylvania
- County: Potter
- Incorporated: 1828

Area
  - Total: 36.62 sq mi (94.85 km^{2})
  - Land: 36.62 sq mi (94.85 km^{2})
  - Water: 0 sq mi (0.00 km^{2})

Population (2020)
  - Total: 330 ▲
  - Estimate (2021): 327
  - Density: 8.7/sq mi (3.35/km^{2})
- Time zone: UTC-5 (Eastern (EST))
  - Summer (DST): UTC-4 (EDT)
- Area code: 814
- FIPS code: 42-105-60200

Pike Township is a township in Potter County, Pennsylvania, United States. The population was listed at 330 on the 2020 census. The population rose to 324 people as of 2010.

== Geography ==
According to the United States Census Bureau, the township has a total area of 37.0 square miles (96.0 km^{2}), all land.

Pike Township is bordered by Hector Township to the north, Tioga County to the east, West Branch Township to the south and Ulysses Township to the west.

== Demographics ==
Historical population
Census	Pop.	Note	%±
2000	292		—
2010	324		11.0%
2020	330		1.9%
2021 (est.)	327		−0.9%
U.S. Decennial Census

As of the census of 2000, there were 292 people, 121 households and 89 families residing in the township. The population density was 7.9 people per square mile (3.0/km^{2}). There were 266 housing units at an average density of 7.2/sq mi (2.8/km^{2}). The racial makeup of the township was 99.66% White and 0.34% from two or more races: census data showed no African Americans, Native Americans, Asians, Pacific Islanders, Hispanics or other races.

There were 121 households, out of which 24.8% had children under the age of 18 living with them, 66.1% were married couples living together, 4.1% had a female householder with no husband present, and 26.4% were non-families. 23.1% of all households were made up of individuals, and 9.9% had someone living alone who was 65 years of age or older. The average household size was 2.41 and the average family size was 2.83.

In the township the population was spread out, with 20.2% under the age of 18, 7.2% from 18 to 24, 21.9% from 25 to 44, 31.8% from 45 to 64, and 18.8% who were 65 years of age or older. The median age was 45 years. For every 100 females, there were 100.0 males. For every 100 females age 18 and over, there were 104.4 males.

The median income for a household in the township was $30,625, and the median income for a family was $43,333. Males had a median income of $35,208 versus $18,125 for females. The per capita income for the township was $17,220. About 5.0% of families and 7.8% of the population were below the poverty line, including 9.6% of those under the age of 18 and 6.5% of those 65 or over.
