= Abbott Township, Pennsylvania =

Township in Pennsylvania, US

- Township
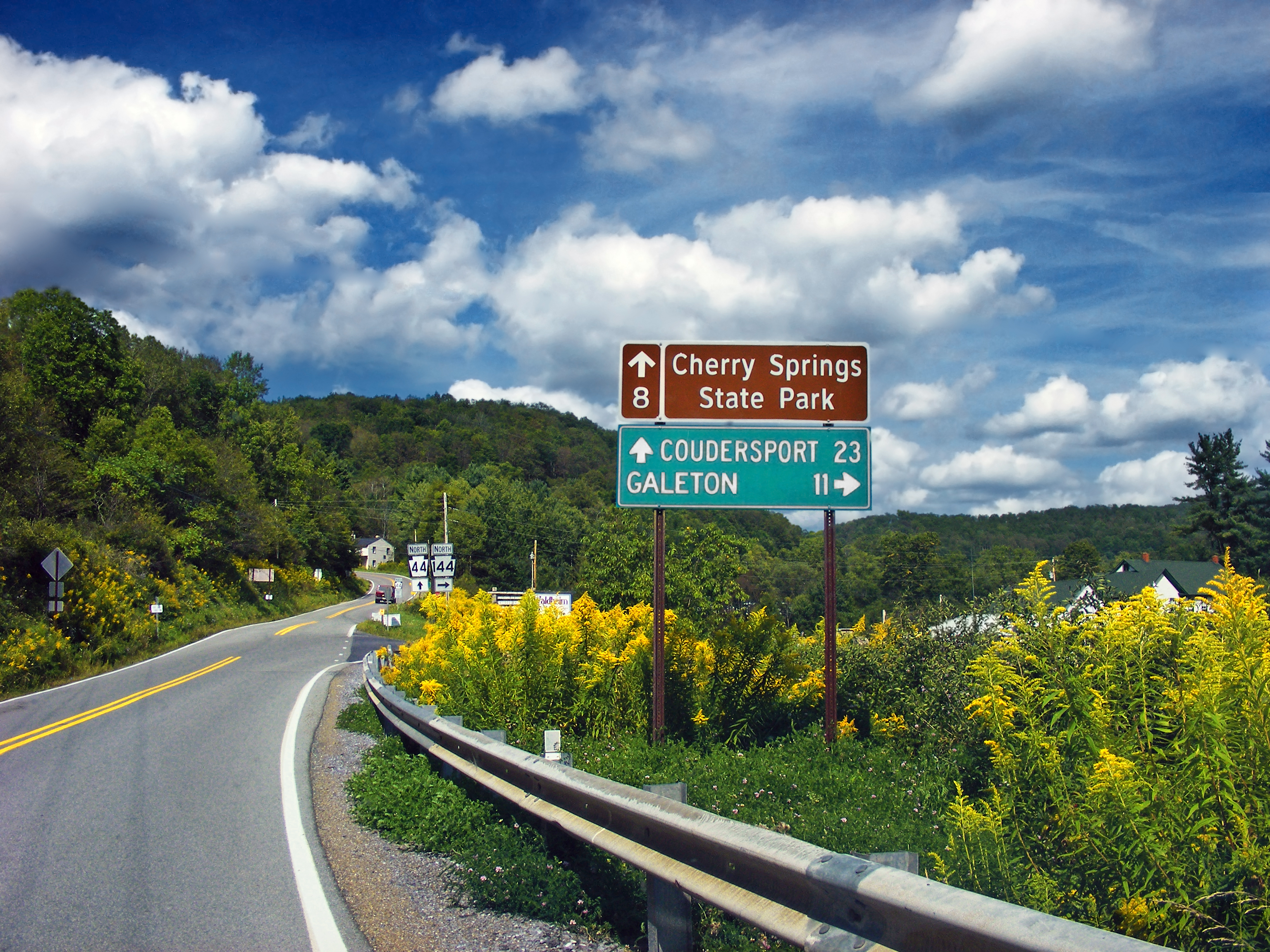
- Pennsylvania Route 44 in Abbott Township at Carter Camp

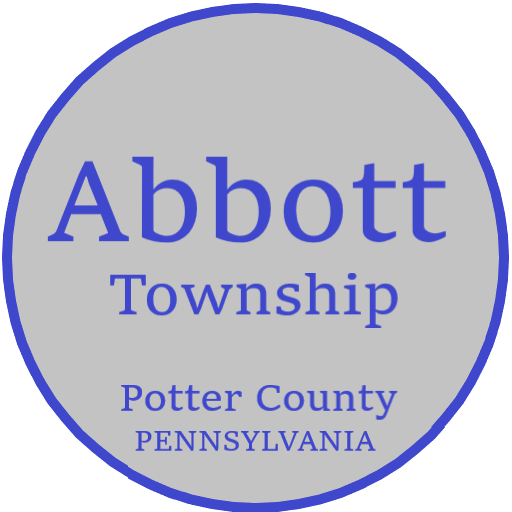
- Seal

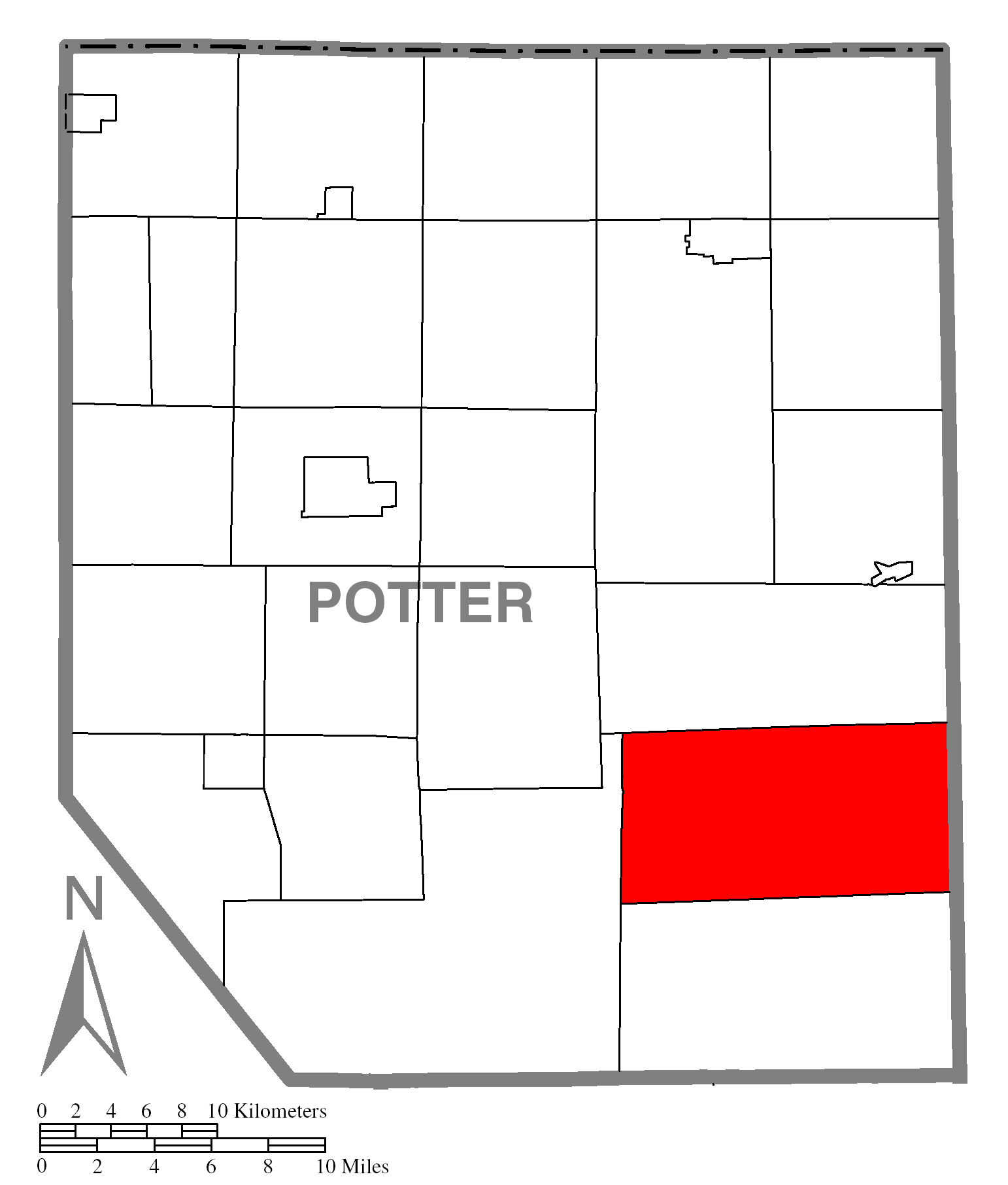
- Map of Potter County, Pennsylvania highlighting Abbott Township

- Map of Potter County, Pennsylvania
- Coordinates: 41°35′00″N 77°36′59″W
- Country: United States
- State: Pennsylvania
- County: Potter
- Incorporated: 1856

Government
  - Type: Board of Supervisors
  - Chairman: Joseph Sutton
  - Vice-chairman: Jake Hastings
  - Roadmaster: Duane Cizek
  - Secretary/Treasurer: Linda S. Culp
  - Tax Collector: Mary May

Area
  - Total: 69.98 sq mi (181.24 km^{2})
  - Land: 69.98 sq mi (181.24 km^{2})
  - Water: 0 sq mi (0.00 km^{2})

Population (2020)
  - Total: 230 ▼
  - Estimate (2021): 228
  - Density: 3.3/sq mi (1.29/km^{2})
- Time zone: UTC-5 (EST)
  - Summer (DST): UTC-4 (EDT)
- FIPS code: 42-105-00108
- Website: abbott-township.org

Abbott Township is a township in Potter County, Pennsylvania, United States. The population was 230 at the 2010 census.

== Geography ==
According to the United States Census Bureau, the township has a total area of 69.9 square miles (181 km^{2}), all land. It is bordered by Tioga County to the east, Stewardson Township to the south, Wharton Township to the west and West Branch Township to the north.

== Demographics ==
Historical population
Census	Pop.	Note	%±
2000	226		—
2010	242		7.1%
2020	230		−5.0%
2021 (est.)	228		−0.9%

As of the census of 2000, there were 226 people, 88 households, and 69 families residing in the township. The population density was 3.2 people per square mile (1.2/km^{2}). There were 457 housing units at an average density of 6.5/sq mi (2.5/km^{2}). The racial makeup of the township was 99.12% White, and 0.88% from two or more races.

There were 88 households, out of which 26.1% had children under the age of 18 living with them, 71.6% were married couples living together, 5.7% had a female householder with no husband present, and 20.5% were non-families. 18.2% of all households were made up of individuals, and 8.0% had someone living alone who was 65 years of age or older. The average household size was 2.57 and the average family size was 2.86.

In the township the population was spread out, with 22.6% under the age of 18, 3.1% from 18 to 24, 25.7% from 25 to 44, 33.6% from 45 to 64, and 15.0% who were 65 years of age or older. The median age was 44 years. For every 100 females, there were 119.4 males. For every 100 females age 18 and over, there were 116.0 males.

The median income for a household in the township was $25,250, and the median income for a family was $26,250. Males had a median income of $26,667 versus $15,625 for females. The per capita income for the township was $14,068. About 2.7% of families and 6.1% of the population were below the poverty line, including 4.3% of those under the age of 18 and 8.9% of those 65 or over.
