= Allegany Township, Pennsylvania =

Township in Pennsylvania, US

Allegany Township, Potter County, Pennsylvania
- Township
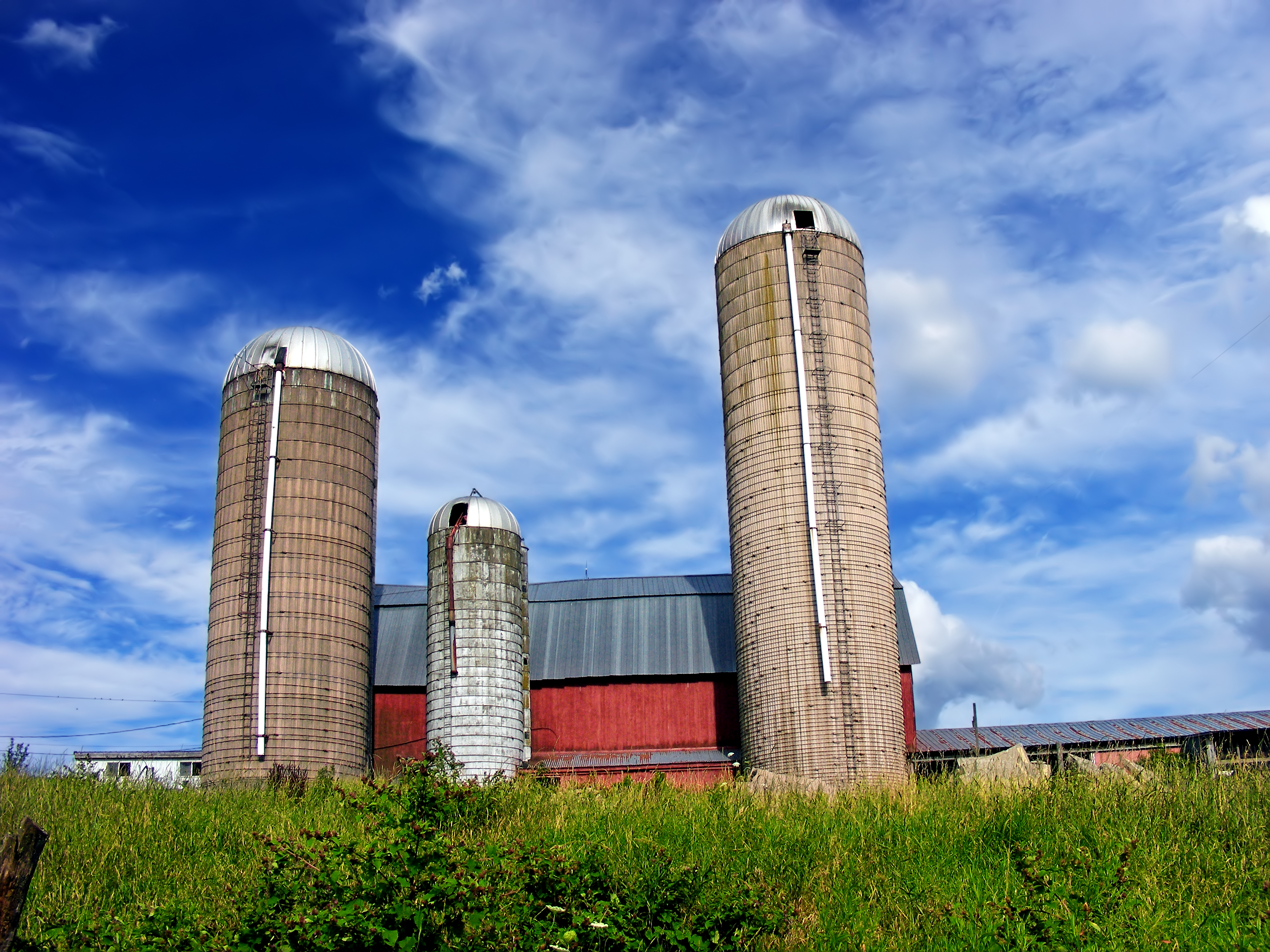
- An Allegany Township farm

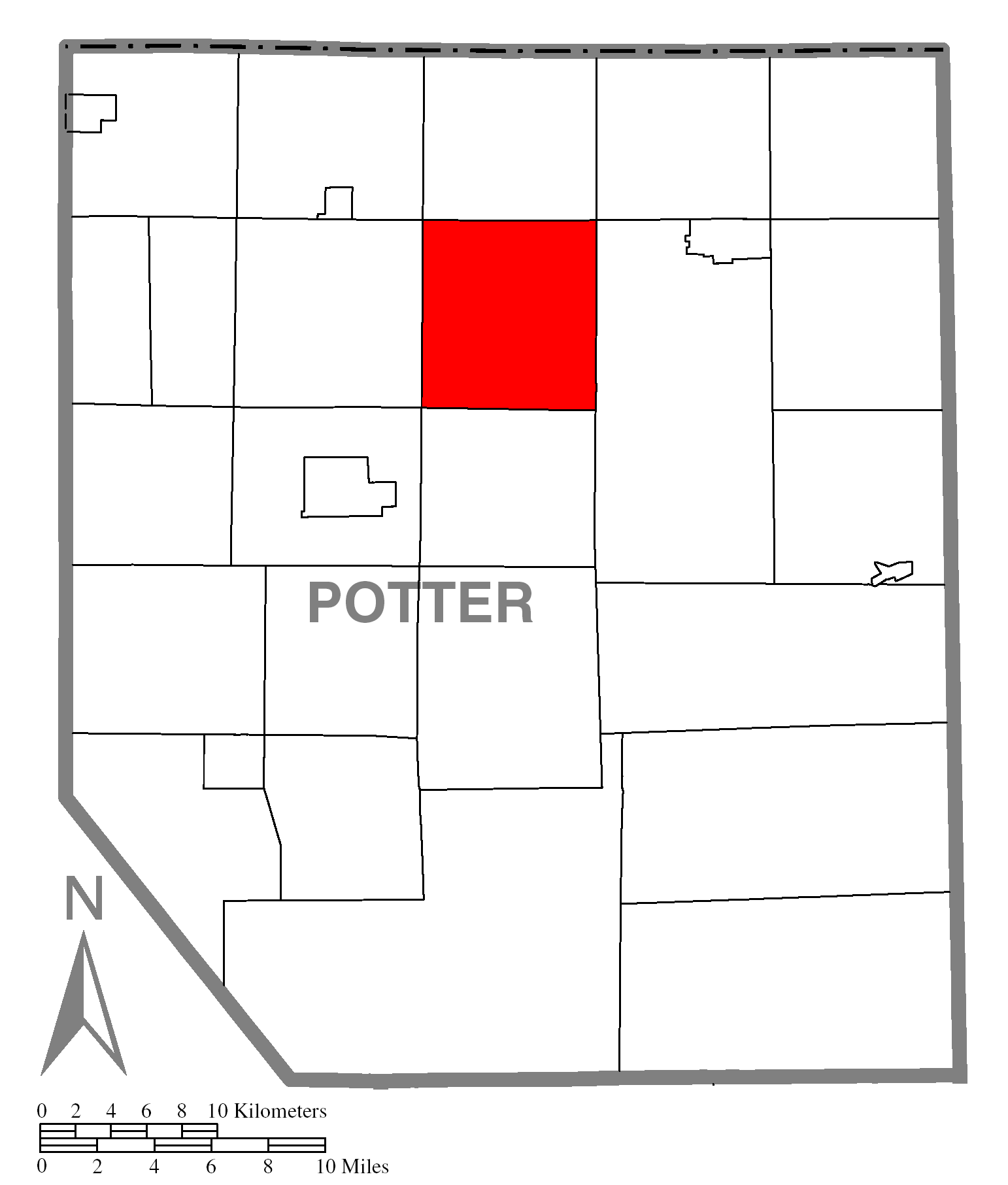
- Map of Potter County, Pennsylvania highlighting Alleghany Township

- Map of Potter County, Pennsylvania
- Country: United States
- State: Pennsylvania
- County: Potter
- Incorporated: 1828

Area
  - Total: 40.53 sq mi (104.98 km^{2})
  - Land: 40.51 sq mi (104.93 km^{2})
  - Water: 0.019 sq mi (0.05 km^{2})

Population (2020)
  - Total: 397 ▼
  - Estimate (2021): 393
  - Density: 10.0/sq mi (3.86/km^{2})
- Time zone: UTC-5 (EST)
  - Summer (DST): UTC-4 (EDT)
- FIPS code: 42-105-00836

Allegany Township is a township in Potter County, Pennsylvania, United States. The population was 397 at the 2020 census.

Allegany Township is unusual in that it uses a variant spelling of the word Allegheny more commonly associated with the state of New York in its name. Most other entities in Pennsylvania use the "Allegheny" spelling.

== Geography ==
According to the United States Census Bureau, the township has a total area of 40.3 square miles (104 km^{2}), of which 40.3 square miles (104 km^{2}) is land and 0.04 square miles (0.10 km^{2}) (0.05%) is water.

Allegany Township is bordered by Genesee Township to the north, Ulysses Township to the east, Sweden Township to the south and Hebron Township to the west.

Cobb Hill, located in this township, is part of the St. Lawrence River Divide. Its north slope is the headwaters of the West Branch of the Genesee River while the south slope contains the headwaters of the Allegheny River. West-northwest of Cobb Hill is Rose Lake, which through the first half of the 20th century fed tributaries of both rivers, and therefore drained into both the Atlantic Ocean (via the St. Lawrence River) and the Gulf of Mexico.

== Demographics ==
Historical population
Census	Pop.	Note	%±
2000	402		—
2010	422		5.0%
2020	397		−5.9%
2021 (est.)	393		−1.0%

As of the census of 2000, there were 402 people, 161 households, and 115 families residing in the township. The population density was 10.0 people per square mile (3.8/km^{2}). There were 253 housing units at an average density of 6.3/sq mi (2.4/km^{2}). The racial makeup of the township was 99.00% White, and 1.00% from two or more races. Hispanic or Latino of any race were 0.25% of the population.

There were 161 households, out of which 26.7% had children under the age of 18 living with them, 66.5% were married couples living together, 4.3% had a female householder with no husband present, and 28.0% were non-families. 23.6% of all households were made up of individuals, and 11.8% had someone living alone who was 65 years of age or older. The average household size was 2.50 and the average family size was 2.94.

In the township the population was spread out, with 23.6% under the age of 18, 4.2% from 18 to 24, 24.9% from 25 to 44, 29.1% from 45 to 64, and 18.2% who were 65 years of age or older. The median age was 43 years. For every 100 females, there were 113.8 males. For every 100 females age 18 and over, there were 103.3 males.

The median income for a household in the township was $37,917, and the median income for a family was $51,250. Males had a median income of $37,031 versus $17,917 for females. The per capita income for the township was $18,391. About 2.5% of families and 7.1% of the population were below the poverty line, including 9.7% of those under age 18 and 13.7% of those age 65 or over.
