= Ulysses, Pennsylvania =

Borough in Pennsylvania, US

- Borough
- Location of Ulysses in Potter County, Pennsylvania.

- Location within the U.S. state of Pennsylvania Ulysses (the United States)
- Coordinates: 41°54′10″N 77°45′40″W
- Country: United States
- State: Pennsylvania
- County: Potter
- Settled: 1831
- Incorporated (borough): 1872

Area
  - Total: 4.05 sq mi (10.50 km^{2})
  - Land: 4.05 sq mi (10.50 km^{2})
  - Water: 0 sq mi (0.00 km^{2})
- Elevation (center of borough): 2,090 ft (640 m)
- Highest elevation (southeast boundary of borough): 2,532 ft (772 m)
- Lowest elevation (Genesee River): 1,995 ft (608 m)

Population (2020)
  - Total: 599
  - Density: 147.8/sq mi (57.05/km^{2})
- Time zone: Eastern (EST)
  - Summer (DST): EDT
- ZIP code: 16948
- Area code: 814
- FIPS code: 42-78240

Ulysses is a borough in Potter County, Pennsylvania, United States. The population was 600 at the 2020 census. The borough is located in a rural farming and forested area in north central Pennsylvania, which is known as the Pennsylvania Wilds. It also stands in the middle of the Triple Continental Divide. In 2019 the borough celebrated its sesquicentennial.

== History ==
When it was first settled in 1831, Ulysses was named Lewisville after Orange Lewis, an early settler and prominent farmer who later became justice of the peace and county treasurer. But the post office and newspaper had always called the town Ulysses, and eventually, in 1968, the town itself was officially renamed Ulysses.

== Geography ==
Ulysses is located at 41°54′10″N 77°45′40″W (41.902838, -77.761017).

According to the United States Census Bureau, the borough has a total area of 4.0 square miles (10 km^{2}), all land.

== Demographics ==
Historical population
Census	Pop.	Note	%±
1870	226		—
1880	365		61.5%
1890	459		25.8%
1900	619		34.9%
1910	579		−6.5%
1920	526		−9.2%
1930	514		−2.3%
1940	488		−5.1%
1950	495		1.4%
1960	590		19.2%
1970	590		0.0%
1980	654		10.8%
1990	653		−0.2%
2000	684		4.7%
2010	621		−9.2%
2020	599		−3.5%
2021 (est.)	598	▼	−0.2%
U.S. Decennial Census

At the 2000 census there were 684 people, 268 households, and 183 families residing in the borough. The population density was 170.9 inhabitants per square mile (66.0/km^{2}). There were 296 housing units at an average density of 73.9 per square mile (28.5/km^{2}). The racial makeup of the borough was 98.68% White, 0.73% Native American, 0.15% Pacific Islander, and 0.44% from two or more races. Hispanic or Latino of any race were 0.58%.

There were 268 households, 31.3% had children under the age of 18 living with them, 52.6% were married couples living together, 12.3% had a female householder with no husband present, and 31.7% were non-families. 26.5% of households were made up of individuals, and 13.8% were one person aged 65 or older. The average household size was 2.55 and the average family size was 3.07.

In the borough the population was spread out, with 29.2% under the age of 18, 9.4% from 18 to 24, 25.3% from 25 to 44, 19.7% from 45 to 64, and 16.4% 65 or older. The median age was 33 years. For every 100 females there were 87.4 males. For every 100 females age 18 and over, there were 82.0 males.

The median household income was $23,971 and the median family income was $27,813. Males had a median income of $27,292 versus $20,694 for females. The per capita income for the borough was $11,602. About 25.6% of families and 34.2% of the population were below the poverty line, including 56.3% of those under age 18 and 11.4% of those age 65 or over.

== White supremacist and neo-Nazi presence ==
In the early 20th century, the Ku Klux Klan arrived, giving the town its continuing presence of white supremacists and national significance.

The borough has caught media attention in recent years for a local group's involvement in white supremacy and its practice of Odinism.

In the 1990s, August Kreis III moved to town and established the national headquarters of Aryan Nations. He organized the "World Aryan Congress" meeting of neo-Nazis, skinheads and Klan members held in the borough in the 2000s.

Six members of an Aryan Strike Force cell, who were arrested for plotting a suicide bombing of an "anti-racism" protest, had held weapons training in Ulysses in 2018.

Some local authorities and citizens have resisted, and opposed any involvement in the group's activities.
