= Cherry Springs Airport =

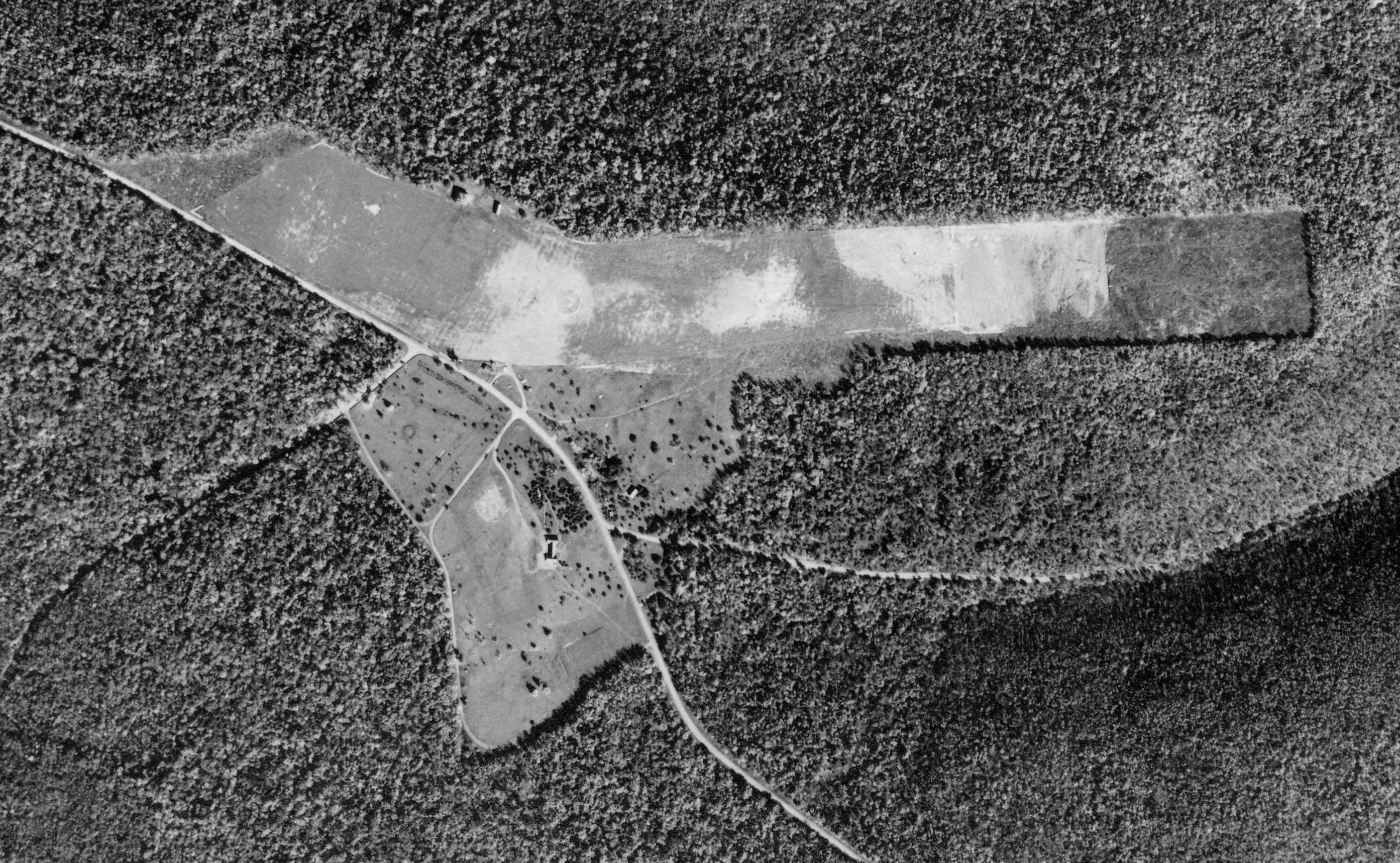
- A 1938 aerial photo of the airport (top) and Cherry Springs State Park
- IATA: none; ICAO: none; FAA LID: 5G6

Summary
- Airport type: Closed
- Owner: Pennsylvania Bureau of Forestry
- Serves: Galeton, Pennsylvania
- Location: West Branch Township, Potter County, Pennsylvania
- Elevation AMSL: 2,297 ft / 700 m
- Coordinates: 41°40′00″N 077°48′59″W
- Interactive map of Cherry Springs Airport

Runways
Direction	Length		Surface
Direction	ft	m	Surface
10/28	3,570	1,090	Turf

Statistics (2005)
- Aircraft operations: 150

Cherry Springs Airport (FAA LID: 5G6) was a small general aviation airport which operated between 1935 and 2007 in Potter County in the U.S. state of Pennsylvania. It was built as an emergency landing field during the Great Depression on land that was part of the Susquehannock State Forest, just north of Cherry Springs State Park. It became a small airport with a sod runway and was the site of a prominent murder in 1952. In 2006 the airport land was transferred to the state park to allow expansion of amateur astronomy there, and it formally closed in 2007. The airport was located on Pennsylvania Route 44 in West Branch Township, about 9 miles (14 km) southwest of the borough of Galeton, Pennsylvania.

== History ==
The name Cherry Springs comes from a tavern or hotel established in 1818 on the road which became Pennsylvania Route 44. The hotel was named for a stand of Black Cherry trees. Susquehannock State Forest, which the airport was formed from, traces its history back to 1901, when its first lands were purchased by the state of Pennsylvania. The average cost for the major acquisitions was $2.50 per acre ($6.18/ha), and in 2003 the state forest had an area of 265,000 acres (107,000 ha), mostly in Potter County with small parts in Clinton and McKean counties.

The state park was founded in 1922 when the Pennsylvania Department of Forestry established the 6.5-mile (10.5 km) "Cherry Springs Scenic Drive" on Pennsylvania Route 44. The land where the hotel was and which became Cherry Springs State Park was purchased by the state in 1932. On May 27, 1933, Civilian Conservation Corps (CCC) Camp S-136-Pa was established at Cherry Springs and built many of the park facilities. CCC Camp S-88-Pa, based at nearby Lyman Run in Potter County, also built some facilities in the park.

Besides the CCC camps active at Cherry Springs, it also was home to Camp Elliott, which was run by the Pennsylvania Department of Forests and Waters (precursor to the Pennsylvania Department of Conservation and Natural Resources (DCNR)). The camp was named for state forester Harry Elliott, and was established to provide work for college students and other unemployed men. In 1935 they built the airport, originally called "Cherry Springs Intermediate Field", just north of the park. It was originally a 40-acre (16 ha) airfield, built for emergency landings.

In 1936, it had a sod runway of dimensions 2,400 by 500 feet (730 by 150 m), and a hangar. It was still listed as a "State Emergency" airport in 1938, but eventually became a small general aviation airport. The land belonged to the Bureau of Forestry, while the airport was privately managed. In 1948 the airport was managed by Alfred L. Sallade and offered 80 octane fuel, flight training, sales, and taxi service.

On September 2, 1952, Sallade was arrested for shooting and killing Charles P. Van Pelt, and seriously wounding Erwin Bergdoll, both aged 19. Both victims were from socially prominent families, and were walking in the park near the airport office on September 1 when Sallade shot them with a shotgun. Sallade reported that he thought the victims were the people who had robbed his office twice in the recent past. Sallade was convicted of manslaughter on December 13, and was sentenced to 4 to 8 years in a state prison in March 1953.

The airport was home to the Sallade Flying School in 1964 and 1990. In 2006 the airport manager was Al Sallade, Jr. and it was home to Sallade Flying Service. That same year the airport was only open from 9 AM to dusk between April and October, while it had only irregular hours of operation the rest of the year. For the year ending May 31, 2005, there were only two aircraft based at the airport and local aircraft accounted for 50 of the total 150 aircraft operations that year.

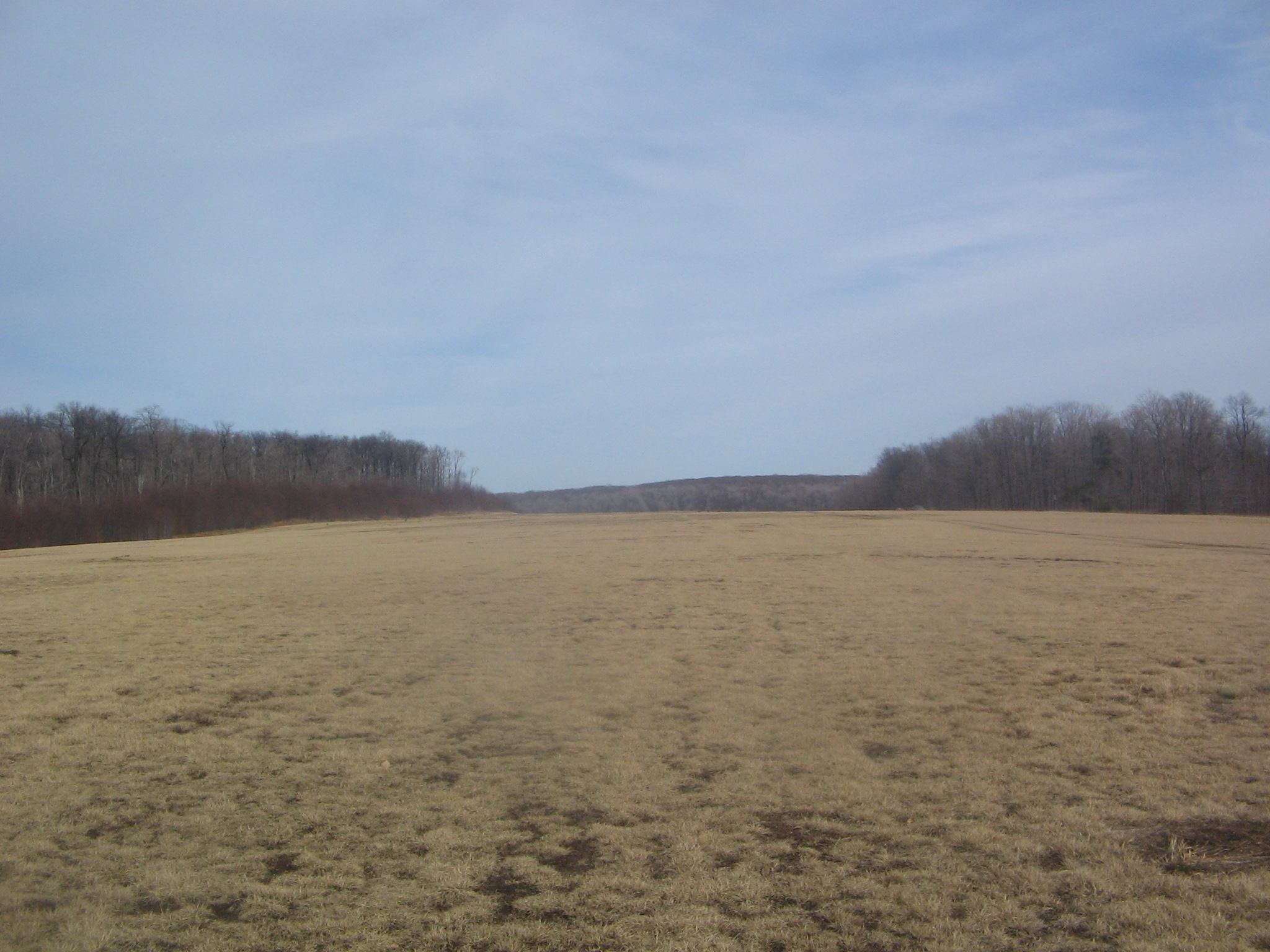
View in 2009 looking east of the former airstrip, which was turf

In the 1990s Cherry Springs State Park became popular with astronomers because of its dark skies, which make it one of the best places to stargaze in the eastern United States. The park was officially named a "Dark Sky Park" by the Pennsylvania DCNR in 2000. Each year the park hosts two major star parties which both attract several hundred astronomers for several nights: the Black Forest Star Party has been held each fall since 1999, and the Cherry Springs Star Party has been held each June since 2005. Public stargazing such as Stars-n-Parks programs have been held at the park since April, 2001.

The DCNR acquired the Cherry Springs Airport in 2006 "to expand the overall Dark Sky observation area and allow for increased programming opportunities" at the park, and it closed in 2007. As of 2009 all of the airport buildings have been razed. An amphitheater for public stargazing programs was built on the former runway, as well as raised earth berms planted with grass have been built to shield the stargazers from the headlights of passing cars. The skies at the park are so dark that the Milky Way casts faint shadows under optimum conditions.

== Facilities ==
In 1981 the airport had expanded from the original 40 acres (16 ha) to an area of 59 acres (24 ha). In 2006 the runway was turf and had dimensions of 3,570 by 180 feet (1,088 by 55 m). The airport had a hangar and tie downs available for aircraft storage, as well as wind direction indicator. The runway was marked with yellow cones and barrels. Hazards at the airport included a soft landing strip "during spring thaw", trees too close to the north side of the runway, and deer on the runway, especially at night.
