= Cherry Springs State Park =

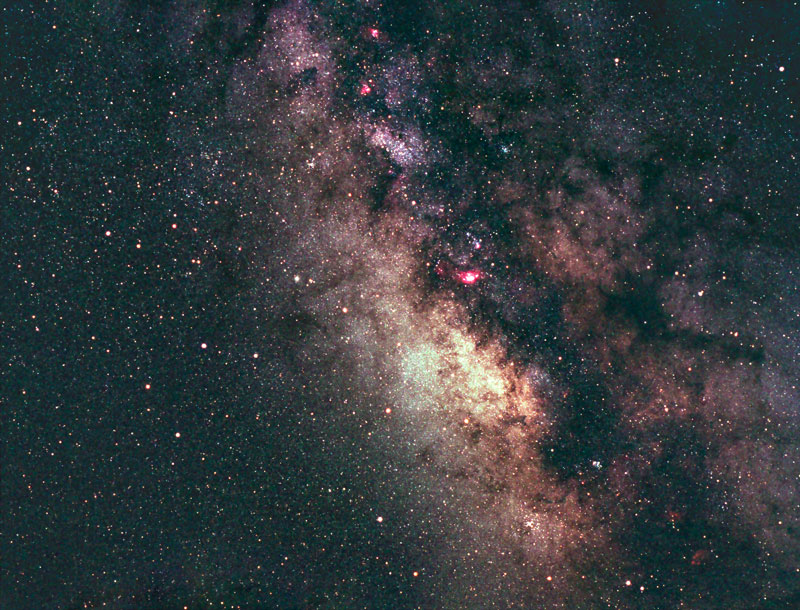
- The sky at Cherry Springs State Park, the second International Dark Sky Park and the first in the eastern US, is so dark that the Milky Way casts a visible shadow.

- Location within Pennsylvania Location within the United States
- Interactive map of Cherry Springs State Park
- Location: Potter County, Pennsylvania, United States
- Coordinates: 41°39′50″N 77°49′24″W
- Area: 82 acres (33 ha)
- Elevation: 2,300 ft (700 m)
- Established: 1922
- Administrator: Pennsylvania Department of Conservation and Natural Resources
- Visitors: 52,229
- Named for: A large stand of cherry trees in the park
- Website: Official website
- Pennsylvania State Parks

Cherry Springs State Park is an 82-acre (33 ha)^{[a]} Pennsylvania state park in Potter County, Pennsylvania, United States. The park was created from land within the Susquehannock State Forest, and is on Pennsylvania Route 44 in West Branch Township. Cherry Springs, named for a large stand of Black Cherry trees in the park, is atop the dissected Allegheny Plateau at an elevation of 2,300 feet (701 m). It is popular with astronomers and stargazers for having "some of the darkest night skies on the east coast" of the United States, and was chosen by the Pennsylvania Department of Conservation and Natural Resources (DCNR) and its Bureau of Parks as one of "25 Must-See Pennsylvania State Parks".

The earliest recorded inhabitants of the area were the Susquehannocks, followed by the Seneca nation, who hunted there. The first settlement within the park was a log tavern built in 1818 along a trail; the trail became a turnpike by 1834 and a hotel replaced the tavern in 1874, then burned in 1897. In the late 19th and early 20th centuries the old-growth forests were clearcut; the state forest was established in 1901 and contains second growth woodlands. "Cherry Springs Scenic Drive" was established in 1922, and the Civilian Conservation Corps built much of Cherry Springs State Park during the Great Depression, including a picnic pavilion listed on the National Register of Historic Places (NRHP). An annual "Woodsmen's Show" has been held in the park each August since 1952.

Cherry Springs State Park was named Pennsylvania's first dark sky park by the DCNR in 2000. The adjoining Cherry Springs Airport, built in 1935, was closed and its land was added to the park in 2006, to expand its stargazing area. On June 11, 2007, the International Dark-Sky Association named it the second "International Dark Sky Park"; under optimum conditions the Milky Way casts a discernible shadow. Cherry Springs has received national press coverage and hosts two star parties a year, which attract hundreds of astronomers. There are regular stargazing and educational programs for the public at the park, and the Woodsmen's Show attracts thousands each summer. Cherry Springs also offers rustic camping, picnic facilities, and trails for mountain biking, hiking, and snowmobiling. The surrounding state forest and park are home to a variety of flora and fauna.

== History ==
=== Native Americans ===
Archeological evidence shows that humans have lived in what is now Pennsylvania since at least 10,000 BC. The first settlers were Paleo-Indian nomadic hunters known from their stone tools. The hunter-gatherers of the Archaic period, which lasted locally from 7000 to 1000 BC, used a greater variety of more sophisticated stone artifacts. The Woodland period marked the gradual transition to semi-permanent villages and horticulture, between 1000 BC and 1500 AD. Archeological evidence found in the state from this time includes a range of pottery types and styles, burial mounds, pipes, bows and arrows, and ornaments.

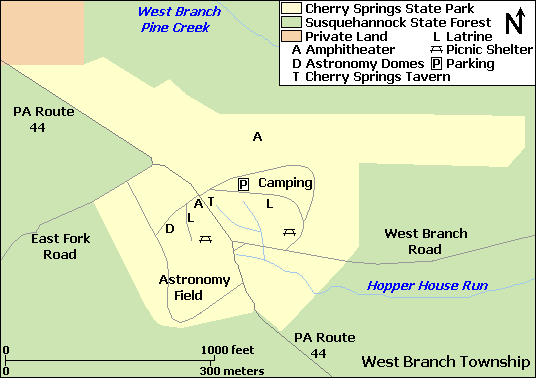
Map of the park and its facilities

Historical records show that the earliest known inhabitants of the West Branch Susquehanna River drainage basin, which includes Cherry Springs State Park, were the Iroquoian-speaking Susquehannocks. They were a matriarchal society that lived in large long houses in stockaded villages. Decimated by disease and warfare with the Five Nations of the Iroquois, by 1675 they had died out, moved away, or been assimilated into other tribes. Another name for the tribe is "Susquehanna", and both the river and the Susquehannock State Forest which almost completely surrounds the park are named for them.

After the departure of the Susquehannocks, the lands of the West Branch Susquehanna River valley were under the nominal control of the Iroquois, who lived in long houses, primarily in what is now upstate New York, and had a strong confederacy which gave them power beyond their numbers. The Seneca, members of the Iroquois Confederacy, hunted in the area of what is now Cherry Springs State Park. Their nearest villages were 51 miles (82 km) to the northeast at modern Painted Post, New York, and 43 miles (69 km) to the southeast at what is now Lock Haven, Pennsylvania. The Seneca had temporary hunting camps to the east in the area of Pine Creek Gorge. To fill the void left by the demise of the Susquehannocks, the Iroquois also encouraged displaced tribes from the east to settle in the West Branch watershed, including the Lenape (or Delaware) and Shawnee.

The Seneca allowed very few travelers to pass through the area and kept non-native settlement to a minimum. The French and Indian War (1754–1763) led to the migration of many Native Americans westward to the Ohio River basin, and more departed after the American Revolutionary War (1775–1783). The United States acquired the Last Purchase, including what is now Cherry Springs State Park, from the Iroquois in the second Treaty of Fort Stanwix in October 1784. In the years that followed, Native Americans almost entirely left Pennsylvania.

=== Pioneers and lumber ===
Potter County was formed from part of Lycoming County on March 26, 1804, but the difficult terrain and thick old-growth forest prevented the new county from being settled by European-Americans until 1808. Prior to the arrival of William Penn and his Quaker colonists in 1682, up to 90 percent of what is now Pennsylvania was covered with woods: more than 31,000 square miles (80,000 km^{2}) of eastern white pine, eastern hemlock, and a mix of hardwoods. The forests in and near the three original counties, Philadelphia, Bucks, and Chester, were the first to be harvested, as the early settlers used the readily available timber and cleared land for agriculture. By the time of the American Revolution, logging had reached the interior and mountainous regions, and became a leading industry in Pennsylvania. Trees furnished fuel to heat homes, tannin for the state's many tanneries, and wood for construction, furniture, and barrel making. Large areas of forest were harvested by colliers to fire iron furnaces. Rifle stocks and shingles were made from Pennsylvania timber, as were a wide variety of household utensils, and the first Conestoga wagons.

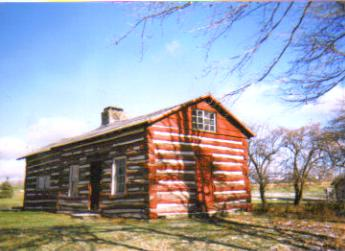
The CCC built this replica of the Cherry Springs Hotel, the tavern built by Jonathan Edgcomb in 1818.

The area surrounding Cherry Springs State Park has been a wilderness for much of its history. A bridle path was cut through the woods in 1806–1807, and was widened to accommodate wagons in 1812. (Modern Pennsylvania Route 44, which passes through the park, follows the course of this path between Jersey Shore and Coudersport.) In 1818 the Ceres Land Company, which owned much of the land in Potter County and sought to open the area to settlement, hired an early settler, Jonathan Edgcomb, to build a tavern or hotel for travelers at the site of the park. The hotel was in a very remote location 16 miles (26 km) south of Coudersport, and its visitors were few, occasional wandering travelers or Native Americans.

Edgcomb and his wife received 100 acres (40 ha) of land in exchange for building the hotel and running it for three years. When the contract expired in 1821, they sold their land and left the area, but the hotel and land that Edgcomb had cleared became known as "Edgcomb's Clearing". The Jersey Shore and Coudersport Turnpike was constructed along the wagon path between 1825 and 1834, and tolls were collected for travel on the road until 1860. The park is in West Branch Township, which was incorporated from Eulalia Township in 1856. A post office was opened at Edgcomb's Clearing in 1873; the locals petitioned the United States Post Office to change the name to "Cherryville", for a nearby group of Black Cherry trees. However, since there was already a Cherryville, Pennsylvania, post office in Lehigh Township in Northampton County, the name "Cherry Spring" was chosen as a compromise. In time an "s" was added, hence the name "Cherry Springs". There are also at least two springs in the park.

In 1874 a new, larger hotel was built on the other side of the road from the original tavern. It provided accommodations for wealthy summer visitors from Coudersport. This part of Potter County became known for an abundance of game and fish, and attracted hunters and anglers who also stayed at the Cherry Springs Hotel. This era as a "sportsmen's paradise" was not to last, as the more profitable lumber industry came to West Branch and surrounding townships, which were home to "some of the tallest, straightest timber left standing" along the East Coast of the United States.

When lumbermen reached the Cherry Springs area in the late 1880s, eastern white pine and eastern hemlock covered the surrounding mountains. Lumberjacks harvested the trees and sent them down the creeks to the West Branch Susquehanna River to the Susquehanna Boom and sawmills at Williamsport. Clearcutting allowed silt to choke the streams, and nothing was left except the dried-out tree tops, which became a fire hazard. As a result, large swaths of land burned and were left barren, and much of the central part of the state became known as the "Pennsylvania Desert". The Cherry Springs Hotel itself burned in 1897 and the property was abandoned.

=== Civilian Conservation Corps ===
- Cherry Springs Picnic Pavilion
- U.S. National Register of Historic Places
- Location: 8 mi. N of Carter Camp off PA 44, West Branch Township, Pennsylvania
- Area: less than one acre
- Built: 1933
- Architect: Civilian Conservation Corps
- MPS: Emergency Conservation Work (ECW) Architecture in Pennsylvania State Parks: 1933–1942, TR
- NRHP reference No.: 87000052
- Added to NRHP: May 11, 1987

As the timber was exhausted and the land burned, many companies simply abandoned their holdings. In 1897 the Pennsylvania General Assembly passed legislation which authorized the purchase of "unseated lands for forest reservations" and the first Pennsylvania state forest lands were acquired the following year. The first land for the Susquehannock State Forest was acquired in 1901; the cost for the major acquisitions was an average of $2.50 per acre ($6.18/ha). This is roughly equivalent to $65 per acre ($163 per ha) in 2025 terms. As of 2003, the Susquehannock State Forest, which almost entirely surrounds the park, covered 265,000 acres (107,000 ha), chiefly in Potter County with small tracts in Clinton and McKean counties.

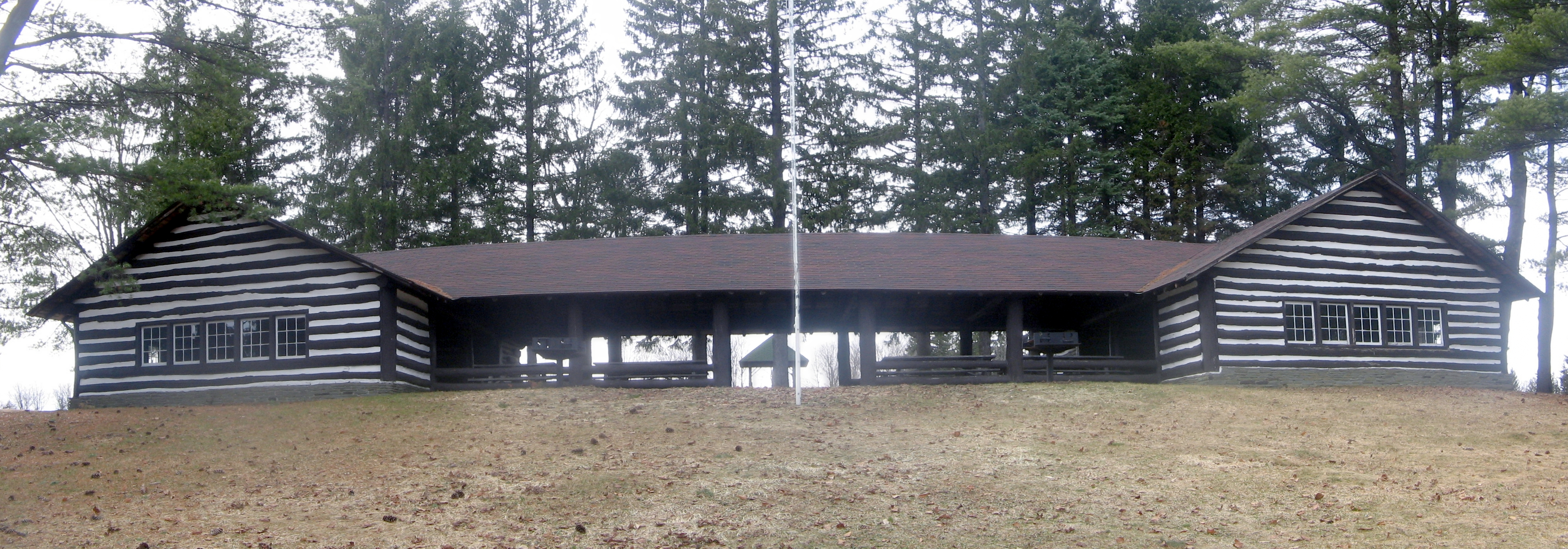
"The largest and most unique of the CCC-built picnic pavilions" in Pennsylvania was constructed in 1939.
Highway side.

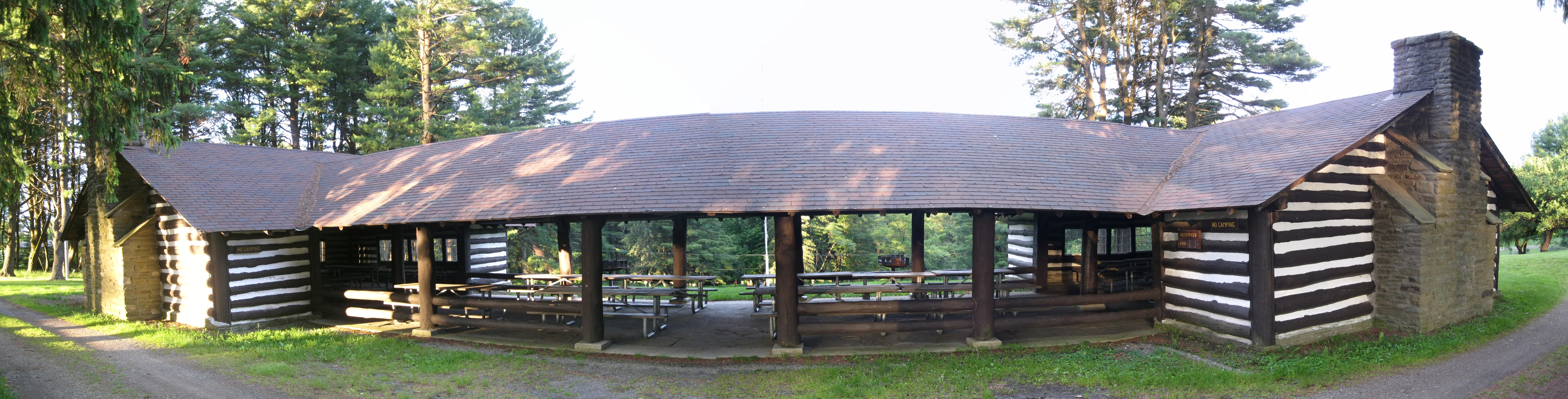
Astronomy Field side.

The park traces its existence back to 1922, when the Pennsylvania Department of Forestry established three scenic areas in state forests as part of a "plan for retaining their natural beauty". One of these was the 6.5-mile (10.5 km) "Cherry Springs Scenic Drive" on the old Coudersport-Jersey Shore Turnpike. That same year, one of 16 "Class B" public campgrounds in the state forests was located on Cherry Springs Drive.^{[b]} These campgrounds were free for the public to use and all had potable water, picnic tables, a fireplace, garbage can, and a latrine. The land where the hotel sat was purchased by the state in 1932.

Like many state parks in north central Pennsylvania, development of the facilities at Cherry Springs was the work of the Civilian Conservation Corps (CCC), a work relief program for young men from unemployed families. Established in 1933 as part of President Franklin D. Roosevelt's New Deal legislation, the CCC was designed to combat unemployment during the Great Depression. It operated in every U.S. state, and established ten CCC camps in the Susquehannock State Forest, of which eight were in Potter County.

Cherry Springs was home to CCC Camp S-136-Pa, which was established on May 27, 1933. According to the camp's 1936 History: "Through the efforts of the [CCC] enrollees Cherry Springs Park, formerly a clearing, has been transformed into a park of which the people of Potter County can be proud of."[sic] A historic recreation of the original tavern was built, as were a rifle range, picnic tables and shelters, roads, and hiking trails. The young men of the CCC camps worked to clear brush from the woods as a fire prevention measure. After clearing the woods, they planted stands of Norway Spruce and white pine, as well as an apple orchard. Camp-136-Pa closed on July 10, 1937.

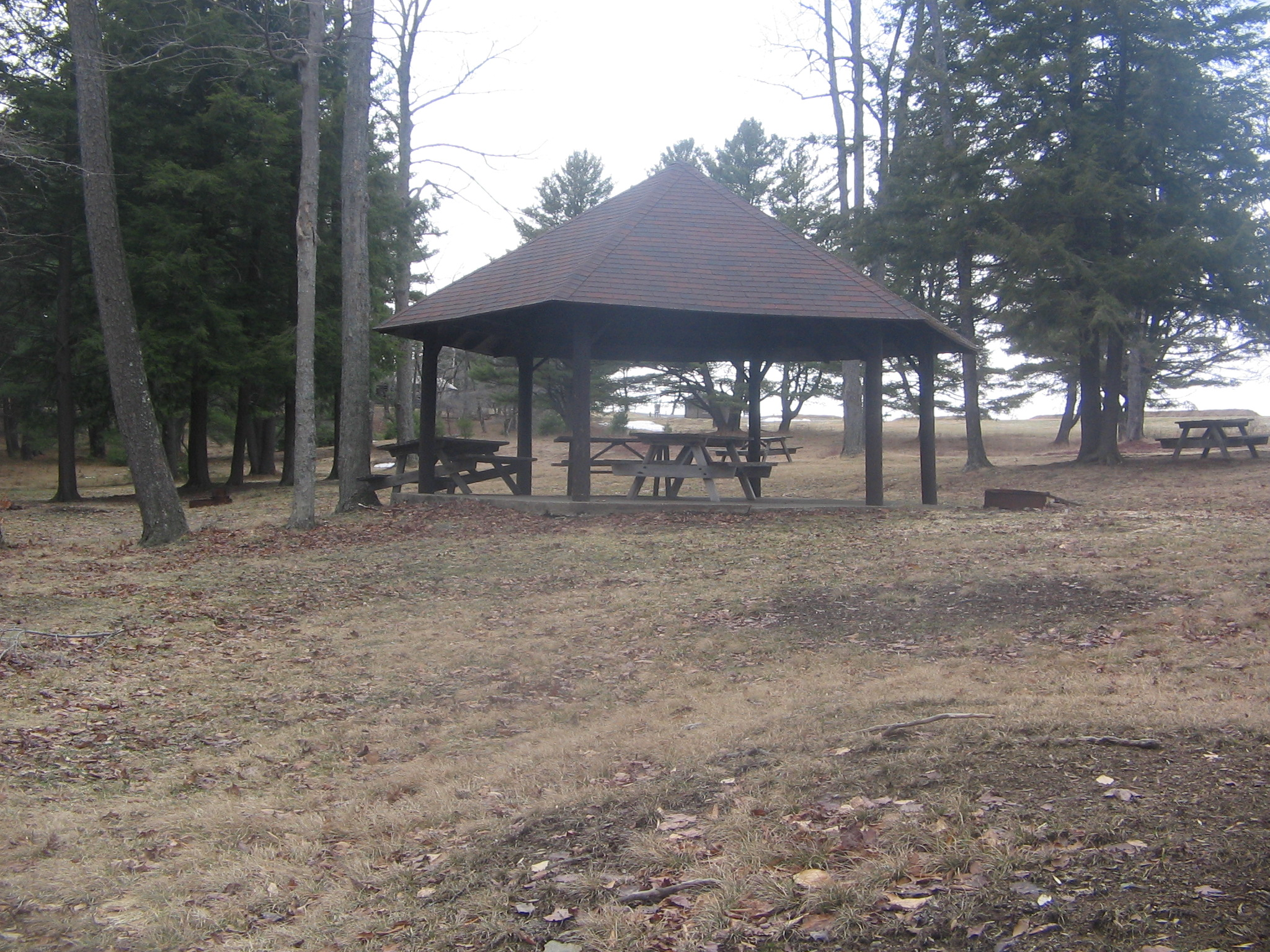
The other CCC-built picnic pavilion has a hexagonal roof and is in the camping area.

Men from CCC Camp S-88-Pa, based at nearby Lyman Run in Potter County, were also active in the park. In 1939, they built a structure at Cherry Springs which is "the largest and most unique of the CCC-built picnic pavilions" in the state, and is listed on the National Register of Historic Places. The pavilion overlooks PA Route 44 and is shaped like an H, with two partially enclosed structures (the vertical lines of the H) connected by a breezeway (the horizontal bar). The breezeway is a roof supported by eight log columns with log railings. The ends of the pavilion are built from log walls with white chinking, like log cabins. Each end has a large opening to the breezeway in one wall, while the other three sides are fully enclosed with a large window in the wall facing the highway, a stone fireplace and chimney on the opposite wall, and a door flanked by windows on the wall opposite the breezeway.

A 1984 survey of Pennsylvania state parks found the "three picnic pavilions, and their associated latrines" at Cherry Springs "typical of the smallest day use areas constructed by the CCC". These pavilions are examples of the rustic style built by the CCC in state parks throughout the Great Depression. Local materials were used in a way that minimized impact on the natural surroundings, and in a manner that resembled the building style of the pioneer settlements of the Appalachian Mountains.

In addition to the two CCC camps active at the park, Cherry Springs also was home to Camp Elliott, which was run by the Pennsylvania Department of Forests and Waters (precursor to the Department of Conservation and Natural Resources (DCNR)) for college students and other unemployed men. In 1935 they built an airfield, Cherry Springs Intermediate Field, just north of the park. The 40-acre (16 ha) airfield was originally built for emergency landings and later became a small airport. In 1936 it had a sod runway of dimensions 2,400 by 500 feet (730 by 150 m), and a hangar. The United States' entry into the Second World War led to the end of the CCC and all its camps were closed by the summer of 1942.

=== Modern era ===
The park has had several names through the years, starting with its 1922 establishment as "Cherry Springs Scenic Drive" and the associated "Cherry Springs 'Class B' public campground". The 1941 Pennsylvania Department of Highways official map of Potter County shows it as "Cherry Springs State Park". On November 11, 1954, the Pennsylvania Geographic Board officially named it "Cherry Springs State Forest Picnic Area". Forrey's 1984 History of Pennsylvania's State Parks and the 1986 NRHP nomination form still used this name, but Forrey clarified that it was "under the jurisdiction of the Bureau of State Parks". Cupper's 1993 Our Priceless Heritage: Pennsylvania's State Parks 1893–1993 refers to it as "Cherry Springs State Park", and this remains the official name as of 2009.

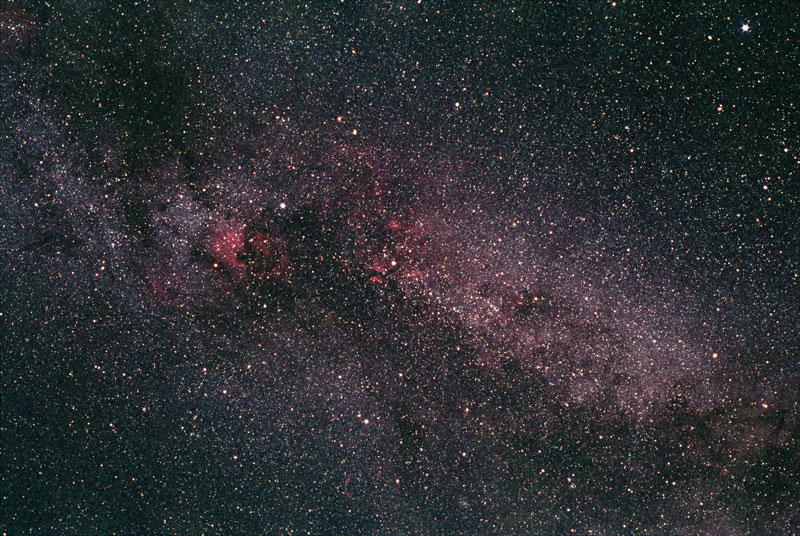
Up to 10,000 stars, such as these in the constellation Cygnus, can be seen from the park.

In the post-war era, the park was long known chiefly for its isolated location and primitive camping facilities. In August 1952 it played host to the first Woodsmen's Carnival, an annual celebration of the lumbering industry, which was again active in the second growth forests in the area. The festival, originally sponsored by the Penn-York Lumbermen's Club, features lumberjack competitions as a reminder of the past, as well as displays of new equipment. In 1987 the Galeton Rotary Club took over sponsorship, and renamed the event the Woodsmen's Show in 1990.

In the 1980s, the CCC and its work in the park were honored. Cherry Springs State Park was one of several to celebrate the fiftieth anniversary of the founding of the Civilian Conservation Corps with a CCC reunion in the summer of 1983. On May 11, 1987, the Cherry Springs Picnic Pavilion was listed on the NRHP. None of the other remaining CCC structures in the park had retained its historic integrity sufficiently to be included on the NRHP.

Cherry Springs began attracting stargazers in the early 1990s. In 1999 the "Dark Sky Fund" was established and continues "to enhance the stargazing and astronomy experience" by funding improvements at the park. In 2000 Cherry Springs was officially named a "Dark Sky Park" by the DCNR, and that same year it became part of the Hills Creek State Park complex, an administrative grouping of eight state parks in Potter and Tioga counties. The headquarters for Cherry Springs are at nearby Lyman Run State Park. The National Public Observatory picked it "as the pilot for the Stars-n-Parks program" in April 2001. The DCNR acquired the Cherry Springs Airport in 2006 "to expand the overall Dark Sky observation area and allow for increased programming opportunities" at the park, and closed it in 2007. On June 11, 2008, the International Dark-Sky Association named Cherry Springs State Park the second "International Dark Sky Park". (The first was Natural Bridges National Monument in Utah.) In 2018, the section of Pennsylvania Route 44 passing through the park was named Highway to the Stars, following an effort led by photographer Curt Weinhold, a Potter County resident, and legislation sponsored by State Representative Martin Causer and approved by Governor Tom Wolf.

== Geology and climate ==
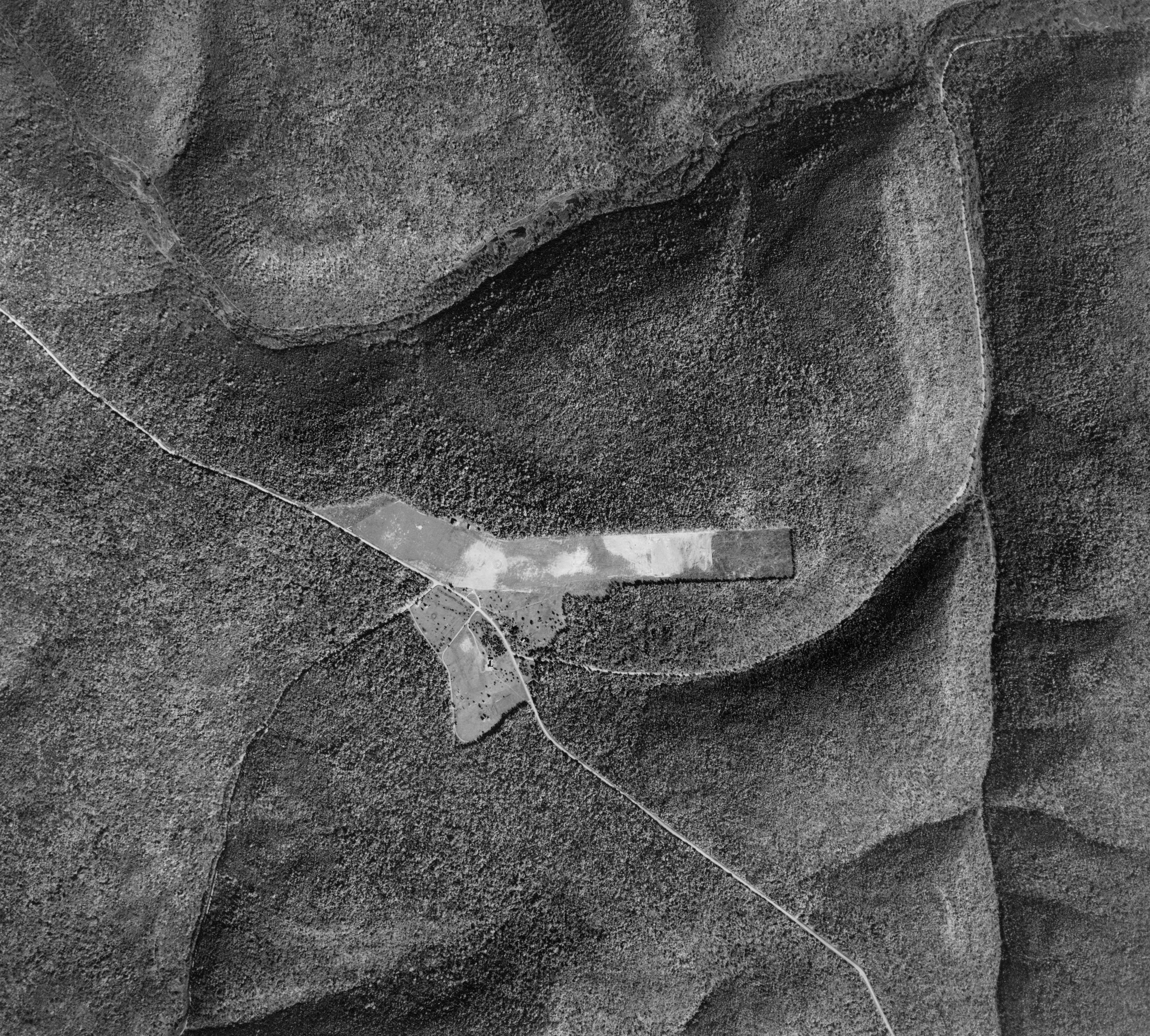
1938 aerial view of the park, airport, PA 44, West Branch Pine Creek, and Hopper House Run

Cherry Springs State Park is at an elevation of 2,300 feet (701 m) above sea level, atop the Allegheny Plateau and "near the glaciated boundary". The plateau and the Appalachian Mountains were all formed in the Alleghenian orogeny some 300 million years ago, when Gondwana (specifically what became Africa) and what became North America collided, forming Pangaea. Although the region appears mountainous, these are not true mountains: instead millions of years of erosion have made this a dissected plateau, causing the "mountainous" terrain seen today. The hardest of the ancient rocks are on top of the ridges, while the softer rocks eroded away forming the valleys.

The park is in the West Branch Pine Creek drainage basin, where the underlying rocks are primarily conglomerate, sandstone, and shale. Two major rock formations are present in Cherry Springs State Park, both at least partly from the Carboniferous period. The youngest of these, which forms the highest points in the park, is the early Pennsylvanian Pottsville Formation, a gray conglomerate that may contain sandstone, siltstone, and shale, as well as anthracite coal. The lower formation is the late Devonian and early Mississippian Huntley Mountain Formation, which is made of relatively soft grayish-red shale and olive-gray sandstone. Outside the park the creek has cut down into the Devonian Catskill Formation, a reddish sandstone.

The Allegheny Plateau has a continental climate, with occasional severe low temperatures in winter and average daily temperature ranges of 20 °F (11 °C) in winter and 26 °F (14 °C) in summer. The mean annual precipitation for the West Branch Pine Creek watershed is 40 to 42 inches (1,016 to 1,067 mm). January is the coldest month at Cherry Springs, July the warmest, and June the wettest. The highest recorded temperature at the park was 94 °F (34 °C) in 1966, and the record low was −28 °F (−33 °C) in 1963.

Climate data for Cherry Springs State Park
Month	Jan	Feb	Mar	Apr	May	Jun	Jul	Aug	Sep	Oct	Nov	Dec	Year
Mean daily maximum °F (°C)	29 (−2)	34 (1)	42 (6)	56 (13)	67 (19)	75 (24)	78 (26)	77 (25)	69 (21)	58 (14)	45 (7)	33 (1)	55 (13)
Mean daily minimum °F (°C)	13 (−11)	15 (−9)	23 (−5)	33 (1)	43 (6)	51 (11)	54 (12)	53 (12)	47 (8)	37 (3)	28 (−2)	18 (−8)	35 (2)
Average precipitation inches (mm)	2.47 (63)	2.28 (58)	2.84 (72)	3.12 (79)	3.73 (95)	5.63 (143)	4.13 (105)	3.99 (101)	3.99 (101)	3.34 (85)	3.59 (91)	2.87 (73)	41.98 (1,066)
Source: The Weather Channel

== Ecology ==
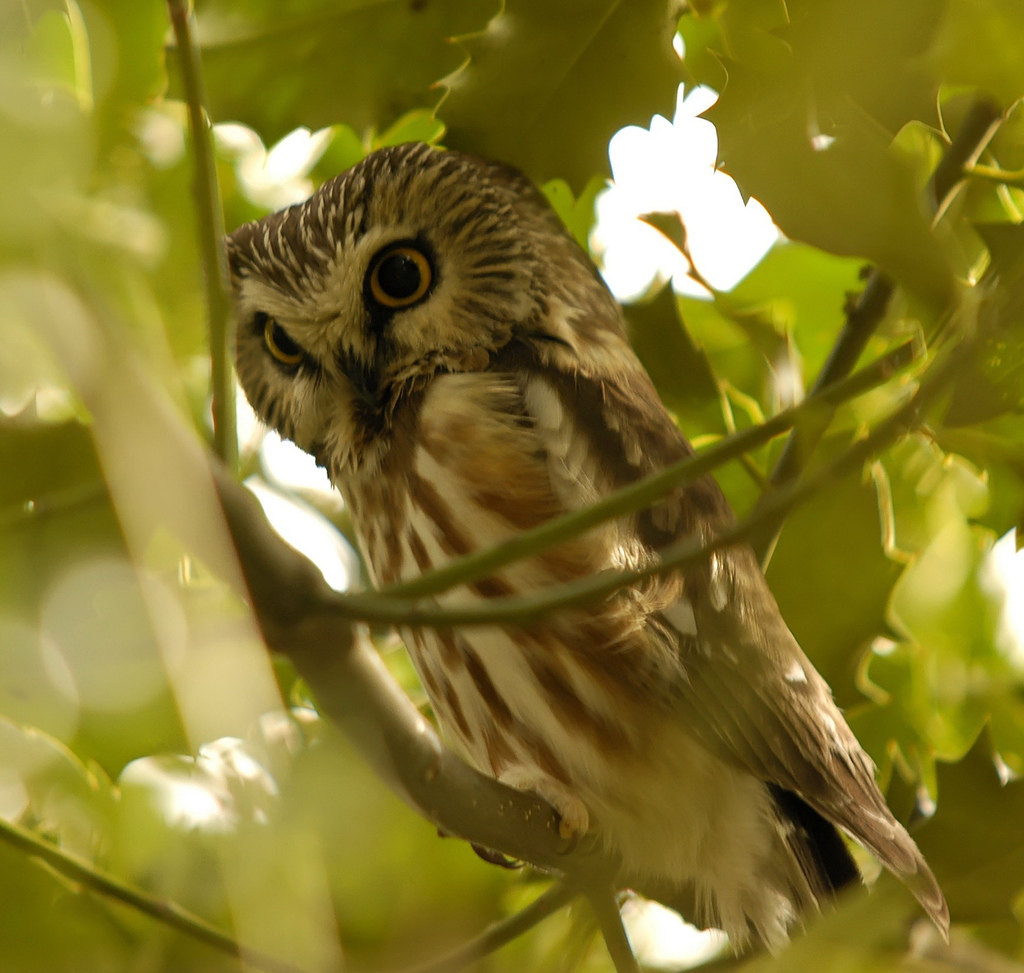
Northern saw-whet owls have been studied in the park.

Cherry Springs State Park and the surrounding Susquehannock State Forest have recovered from the clearcutting of the lumber era. However, the composition of the forests has changed, so that there are now more hardwoods, including sugar maple and black cherry, and fewer eastern white pine and eastern hemlock. The park also has apple trees from the CCC orchard. Over 400 species of birds have been found in Pennsylvania, including 186 that breed in the state. Birds such as ospreys, hawks, owls, nightjars, and bald eagles have returned to the park and state forest, and saw-whet owls have been studied in the park.

Some animals which had been locally extinct have also returned or been reintroduced to the area, including white-tailed deer, elk, fishers (a type of weasel), and otters. Although banned in the park, hunting is allowed in the surrounding state forest, which regained its title as a "sportsmen's paradise" in the 20th century. Game species include black bears, white-tailed deer, ducks, ruffed grouse, rabbits, gray and red squirrels, and wild turkeys. Other animals present in the park and forest include chipmunks, minks, raccoons, porcupines, groundhogs, and the occasional bobcat, as well as frogs, beetles, and moths.

A branch of Hopper House Run rises within the park, and flows east and then north into the West Branch Pine Creek. West Branch Road (or Branch Road) follows the valleys of the run and creek from Pennsylvania Route 44 east 10 miles (16 km) to Galeton. PA 44 roughly follows the line dividing the Pine Creek watershed to the north and the Sinnemahoning Creek watershed to the south. East Fork Road leaves PA 44 in the park and follows the East Fork Sinnemahoning Creek valley southwest 12 miles (19 km) to the village of Conrad. Both creeks are approved trout streams for fishing, which means they are stocked with trout in season.

== Recreation ==
=== Dark skies ===
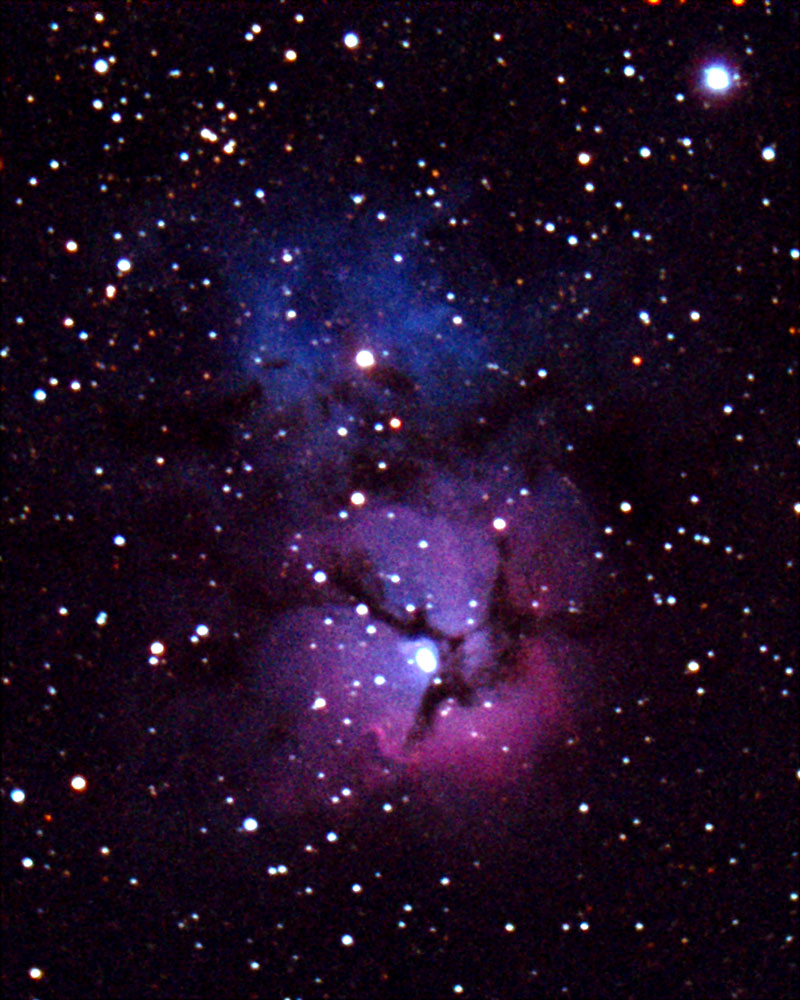
The Trifid Nebula (M20) in Sagittarius, as seen from the park

Astronomers and stargazers appreciate Cherry Springs State Park for the darkness and clarity of its skies, which make it "perhaps the last best refuge of the natural night sky" in the eastern half of the United States. The sky at Cherry Springs has been classified as a 2 on the Bortle Dark-Sky Scale, meaning it has almost no light pollution. Such "truly dark, starry skies are unavailable to two-thirds of the world's population, including 99 percent of people in the continental U.S. and Western Europe". With optimum conditions, 10,000 stars are visible with the naked eye at the park, clouds appear only as black holes in the starry sky, and the Milky Way is so bright that it casts a discernible shadow. In contrast, big city residents can see a few dozen stars at best, and even those in rural areas can typically only see 2,000–3,000 stars. The Milky Way cannot be seen by most in the eastern US, even when there is no moonlight to obscure it.

The quality of the night skies at the park and its growing popularity for stargazing are the result of several factors. Cherry Springs is in the midst of the largely undeveloped 262,000-acre (106,000 ha) Susquehannock State Forest, and is on a summit 2,300 feet (701 m) above sea level. Because it is on the Allegheny Plateau, there are no mountain peaks to block the sky, and the Astronomy Field offers a 360 degree unobstructed view. The closest city is Williamsport, 60 miles (97 km) to the southeast. Surrounding communities sit in deep valleys, so the intervening terrain screens much of the light they produce; the park has no artificial skyglow in any direction. Cherry Springs is generally fog-free and its latitude puts it in excellent position to observe the Galactic Center of the Milky Way. The remote location also means there is little commercial air traffic to interfere with astrophotography, while PA Route 44 still offers relatively easy access to the park from Interstate 80.

In addition to these natural factors, much has been done intentionally to make the skies at the park clear and dark and help keep them that way. Within the park, former overhead electrical lines have been buried so they do not obstruct views, all lighting is shielded, and all white lights have been converted to red, which has the least effect on night vision and astrophotography. Light from passing vehicles is blocked by earthen berms covered with grass, or shrubbery and spruce trees; the Astronomy Field gate has a special light-blocking tarp. The park's Dark Sky Fund has paid for many of these improvements since 1999.

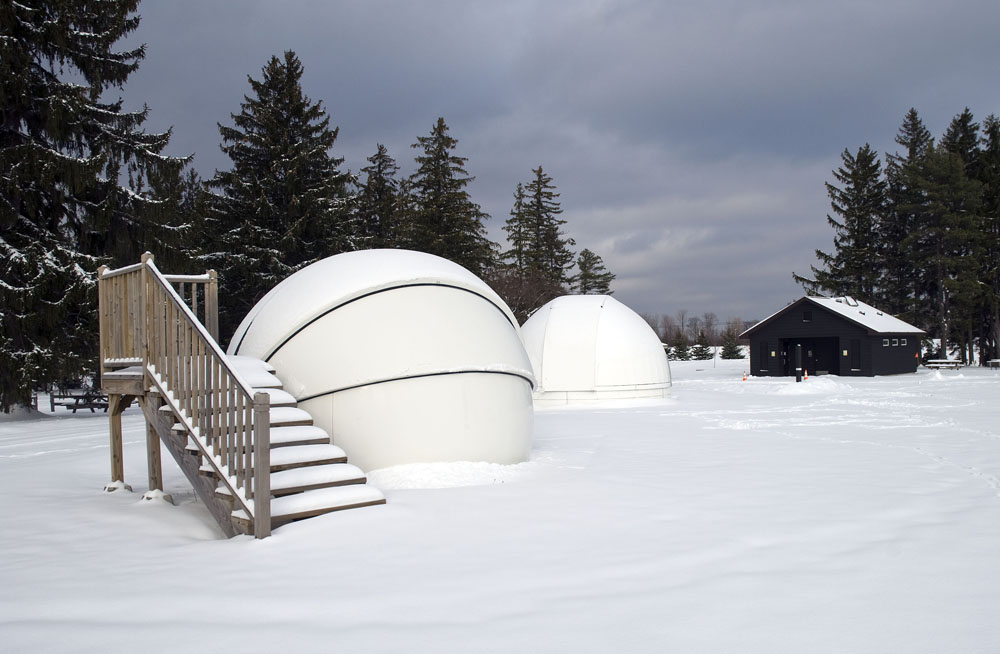
Two of the park's three astronomy domes; the walls prevent the wind from moving telescopes during observation

Since the 2006 acquisition of the Cherry Springs airport, a new Public Programming field has been established on the former airstrip. This field is northeast of PA Route 44 and is intended for educational programs or stargazing, but not for those who spend the night. Overnight observers and those with large telescopes use the Astronomy Field southwest of the highway. Nighttime visitors may only use flashlights with red filters, and may only point them at the ground. The Astronomy Field has further restrictions on lights, and parts of the park are light-free zones.

To help preserve the dark skies at Cherry Springs State Park, Tri-County Rural Electric company installs light-shielding caps on outdoor lights at local homes for free. In 2001 the Pennsylvania General Assembly passed the "Outdoor Lighting Control Act", which both established the park as a "Dark Sky Preserve" and required minimal and shielded lighting at all new state facilities to reduce light pollution. A design guide for the Pennsylvania Wilds region, which includes the park, emphasizes the importance of maintaining dark skies. The DCNR spent $396,000 in June 2007 to buy mineral rights under 1,980 acres (800 ha) of the park and state forest to prevent natural gas drilling and associated development there.

A wind farm has been proposed on a site 13.7 miles (22.0 km) from the park. In 2008 Potter County passed an ordinance that wind turbine lights shall not "interfere with the state-designated Dark Skies Preserve at Cherry Springs State Park". That same year the DCNR commissioned a study on the wind farm's impact, which concluded the red warning lights on the wind turbines would not impact the darkness of the sky and would only be directly visible from the Astronomy Field under rare conditions. Others in the astronomy community challenged these conclusions and feared that new lights on "several dozen wind turbines near the park" will degrade observations and astrophotography. The study also recommended that the DCNR shield and redirect lights at the nearby Denton Hill State Park downhill ski area to make the sky even darker at Cherry Springs.

=== Astronomical observing ===
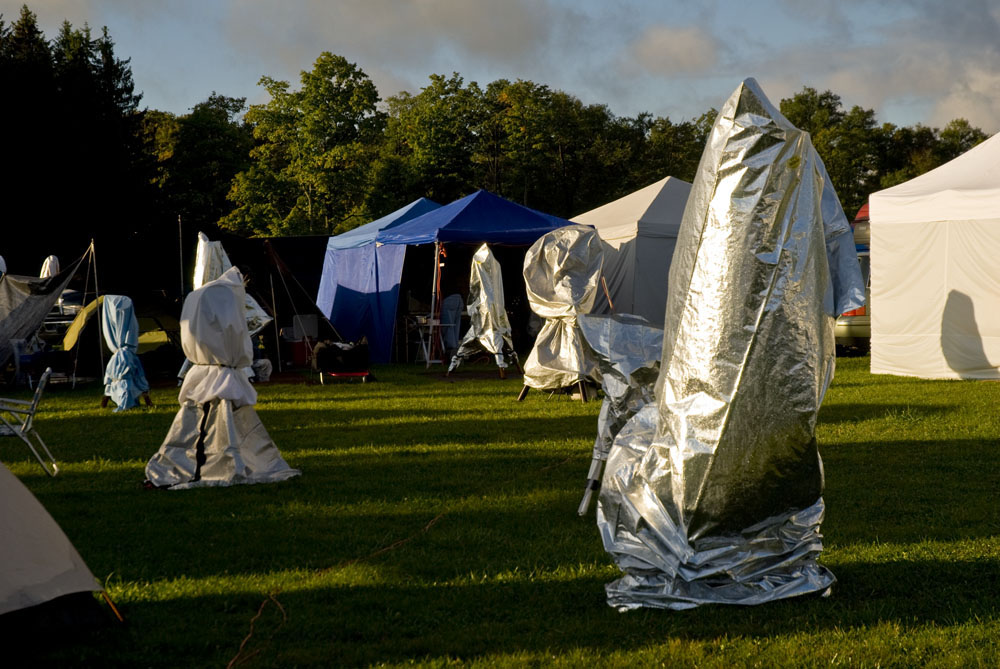
Telescopes belonging to amateur astronomers await nightfall.

The staff at Cherry Springs State Park did not intend for it to become an attraction for amateur astronomers; the astronomers came to them instead. In 1997 or 1998 Chip Harrison, the park supervisor, noticed a man looking through a telescope at the park at about 1 AM. When Harrison asked why the man had come there, the astronomer said he had noticed an isolated black patch over north central Pennsylvania on nighttime satellite photos. Cherry Springs State Park is in that patch, one of the best locations east of the Mississippi River for stargazing.

An increasing number of astronomers began to come to Cherry Springs, most in the 14-day dark sky period around the new moon, between the last quarter and first quarter phases. The park is open year-round and between 60 and 85 nights each year have ideal conditions, when the apparent magnitudes of the faintest stars visible can range from 7.1 to 7.5. The park's Astronomy Field has been upgraded to accommodate these astronomers. In 2005 a rotating 15-foot (4.6 m) slotted observatory dome, two 12-foot (3.7 m) clamshell domes, and a 10-by-12-foot (3.0 by 3.7 m) sky shed were added, as well as a small amphitheater for programs. The four structures protect telescopes from the wind and thermal currents. The next year concrete pads 4 and 6 feet (1.2 and 1.8 m) in diameter were placed at random in the field, and electrical pedestals, each with six outlets, were added to power telescopes and computers. In 2009, Wi-Fi internet access was added to the Astronomy Field.

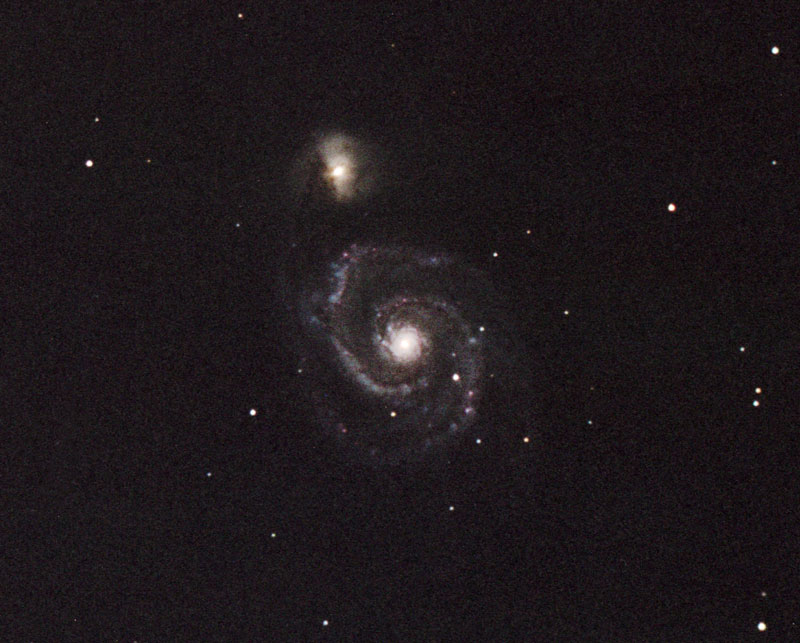
The Whirlpool Galaxy (M51) in the constellation Canes Venatici, as seen from the Astronomy Field

While a typical clear night might have 50 to 100 observers, each year the park hosts two major star parties which both attract several hundred astronomers for several nights. The Black Forest Star Party, sponsored by the Central Pennsylvania Observers of State College, has been held each fall since 1999. The Cherry Springs Star Party, sponsored by the Astronomical Society of Harrisburg, has been held each June since 2005. There are also free public programs at the amphitheater on the former airport site, some of which are part of the National Public Observatory's Stars-n-Parks program. Meteor showers will also attract a crowd and the Aurora Borealis can be seen from the park. A stargazing business, "Crystal Spheres", has been established and presents Music and Stars programs, with an hour-long concert followed by an hour of stargazing. Such "nature tourism" has a positive economic impact for the area.

Awards and press recognition have come to Cherry Springs and its staff. Thom Bemus, who initiated and coordinates the Stars-n-Parks program, was named DCNR's 2002 Volunteer of the Year. In 2007 the park's Dark Sky Programming and staff received the Environmental Education Excellence in Programming award from the Pennsylvania Recreation and Parks Society. Operations manager Chip Harrison and his wife Maxine, who directs the Dark Sky Fund, received a 2008 award from the Pennsylvania Outdoor Lighting Council for "steadfast adherence and active promotion of the principles of responsible outdoor lighting at Cherry Springs State Park". The DCNR has named Cherry Springs one of "25 Must-See Pennsylvania State Parks", specifically for having the "darkest night skies on the east coast". Cherry Springs State Park was featured in the national press in 2003 when USA Today named it one of "10 Great Places to get some stars in your eyes", in 2006 when National Geographic Adventure featured it in "Pennsylvania: The Wild, Wild East", and in The New York Times in 2007. All these were before it was named an International Dark Sky Park by the International Dark-Sky Association in 2008.

=== Woodsmen's Show ===
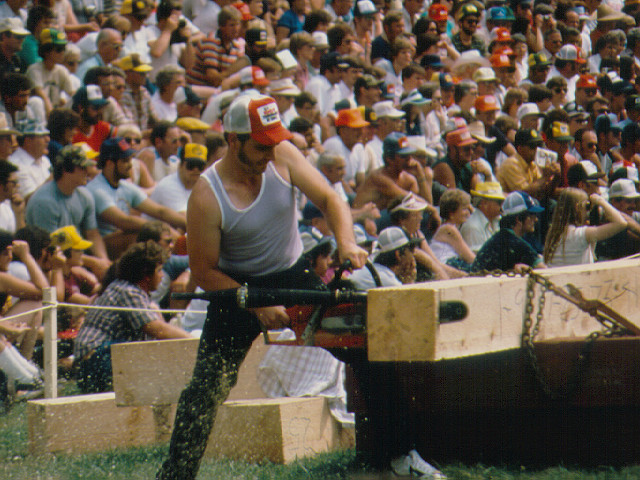
A chainsaw event at the Woodsmen's Show

The Woodsmen's Show attracts thousands of visitors to Cherry Springs State Park on the first weekend in August. It has been held every year since 1952, and has been sponsored by the Galeton Rotary Club since 1987. In 2008 events at the three-day show included tree-felling, cross-cutting, log rolling, axe-throwing, horse pulling, spring board chopping, the standing block chop, and chainsaw competitions and demonstrations. The 2008 show also featured historic recreations of life in a logging camp, musical performances, and vendors selling food, crafts, and equipment related to the lumber industry.

The show and its events, which celebrate Potter County's lumbering history, have changed with time. In the early years, up to three working sawmills were set up just for the carnival, and there was an associated Woodsmen's Ball on Saturday evening, after the carnival ended. The Woodsmen's Show had its first female competitor in 1979. Some events have been tried and discontinued; in 1987 one-hour seminars on topics such as "Outdoor Adventures on Mules" and the first "Woodsmen's Carnival Queen" were introduced, and in 1993 there was tractor pulling with lawn tractors. In 1990 the name was changed from the "Woodsmen's Carnival" to the "Woodsmen's Show", a third day was added, and an ecumenical church service was held Sunday morning in the large picnic pavilion. The next year the show was part of the STIHL Timbersports Series and some of the competition was televised on ESPN. Although it is no longer part of the STIHL series, as of 2008 many of the same athletes competed at the show.

Attendance was 4,000 the first year and grew to 12,000 three years later in 1955, then peaked at 33,000 in 1962, with nearly as many in 1965 (32,000) and 1981 (30,000). In 1983, 20,000 visitors came to the show, 15,000 came in 1985, and by the early 21st century attendance was about 14,000. Admission is charged and cash prizes are awarded in the competitions. Proceeds from the show under the Penn-York Lumbermen's Club went to promote the lumber industry and support the Pennsylvania Lumber Museum. The Galeton Rotary Club has used the funds to improve the standard of living in and around Galeton, including college scholarships, a new roof for the community building, support for the local public library, and clean-up and maintenance of the downtown area.

=== Camping, picnicking, and trails ===
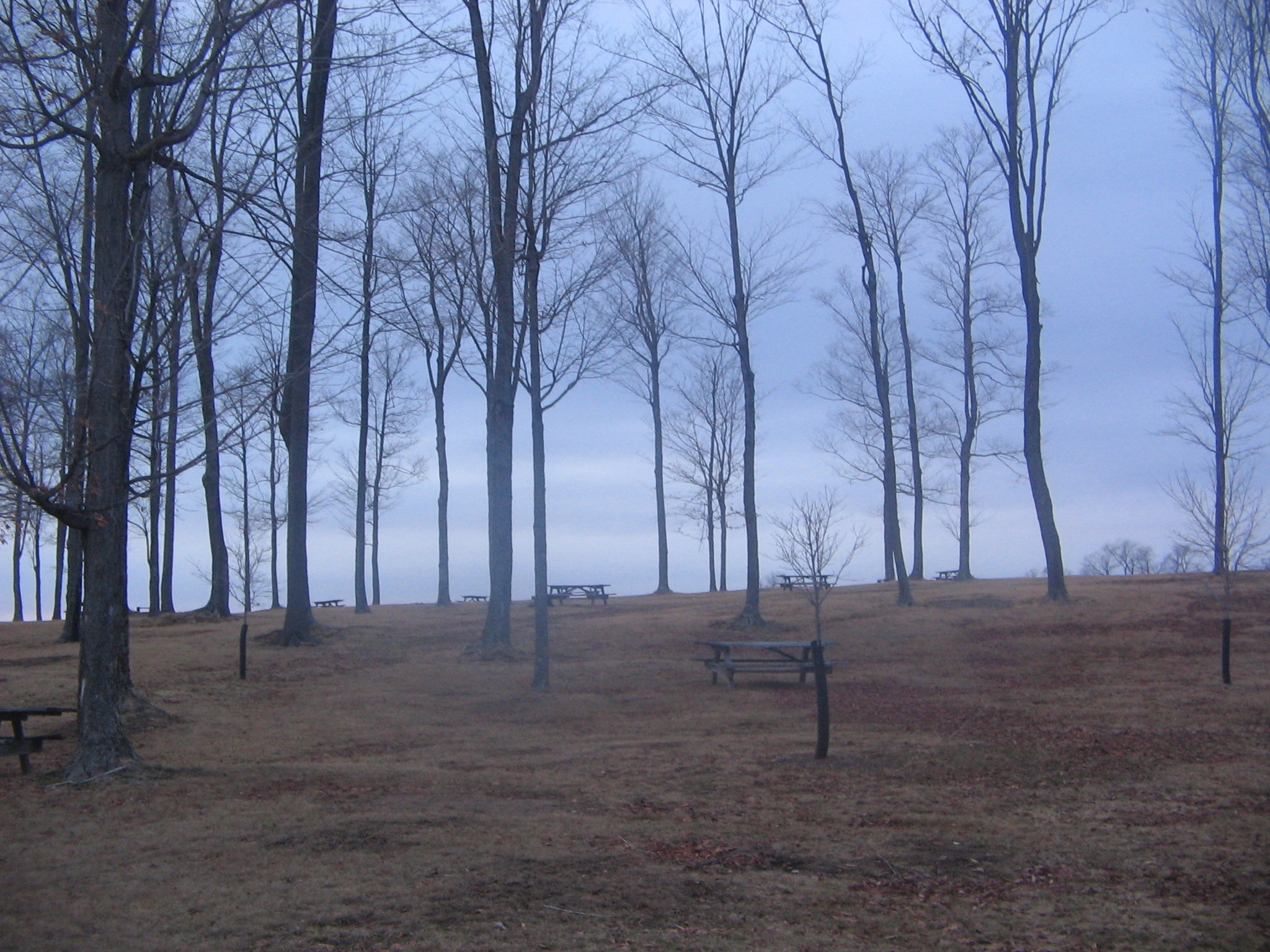
The camping area at the park, with picnic tables

The park has 30 camping sites which can each accommodate a tent, or a recreational vehicle (RV) up to 30 feet (9.1 m) long. The sites all have a fire ring, lantern hanger, and picnic table, and are classified as rustic because they have no running water. The camping area, which is southeast of Pennsylvania Route 44, is open from April to December and does accept reservations. The park has two modern latrines, one in the camping area and the other at the Astronomy Field. There is also a holding tank dump station for RVs. Although the Astronomy Field is not an official camping area, overnight observers may set up tents and vehicles there in which to camp. In addition to the picnic tables and small pavilion in the camping area, the main picnic area at Cherry Springs is on the southwest side of Route 44, in and around the large historic, CCC-built pavilion. The area surrounding the pavilion has many picnic tables situated in an old apple orchard and a stand of huge white pine and Norway spruce trees.

Cherry Springs State Park is at the southern end of a 15-mile (24 km) long, single-track mountain bike trail, which begins at Denton Hill State Park and passes through Patterson State Park. In 2005 the snowmobile trailhead at Cherry Springs was moved to the southern end of the park to avoid the Astronomy Field. The snowmobile trail is one of many trails available for cross-country skiing, backpacking, hiking, and all-terrain vehicle and horseback riding in the surrounding Susquehannock State Forest. The 85-mile (137 km) long Susquehannock Trail System passes close to the park and loops around it. South of the park the trail passes through the Hammersley Wild Area, which at 30,253 acres (12,243 ha) without roads is the second largest wild area in Pennsylvania.

== Nearby state parks ==
Cherry Springs State Park is on Pennsylvania Route 44 in West Branch Township, 10 miles (16 km) southwest of Galeton. The following state parks are within 30 miles (48 km) of Cherry Springs State Park:

- Bucktail State Park Natural Area (Cameron and Clinton Counties)
- Colton Point State Park (Tioga County)
- Denton Hill State Park (Potter County)
- Hyner Run State Park (Clinton County)
- Hyner View State Park (Clinton County)
- Kettle Creek State Park (Clinton Counties)
- Leonard Harrison State Park (Tioga County)
- Lyman Run State Park (Potter County)
- Ole Bull State Park (Potter County)
- Patterson State Park (Potter County)
- Prouty Place State Park (Potter County)
- Sinnemahoning State Park (Cameron and Potter Counties)
- Sizerville State Park (Cameron and Potter Counties)
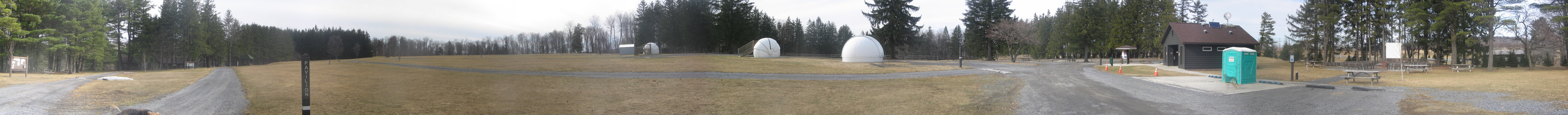
Panoramic view of the park, left to right: astronomy bulletin board, CCC-built picnic pavilion, pumphouse, Astronomy Field, sky shed and three astronomy observation domes, information display, modern latrines, amphitheater, and CCC-built replica of the Cherry Springs Tavern (log cabin across Pennsylvania Route 44)

== Notes ==
a. As of April 2009, the official website for Cherry Springs State Park still lists the area as 48 acres (19 ha), as does Forrey's 1984 History of Pennsylvania's State Parks. This was the size of the park before the Cherry Springs Airport was closed and much of its land was transferred to the park. When built the airport was 40 acres (16 ha), and it had expanded in size to 59 acres (24 ha) by 1981. The airport land was owned by the Bureau of Forestry, which is part of the DCNR along with the Bureau of State Parks. As of January 30, 2015, the official website for Cherry Springs State Park states that it covers 82 acres. "Cherry Springs State Park". Archived from the original on October 9, 2011.

b. Although the park was along the 6.5-mile (10.5 km) Cherry Springs Drive, the exact endpoints of the drive are not clear. Two vistas are southeast of the park on Pennsylvania Route 44: it is 3.1 miles (5.0 km) from the park to Water Tank Hollow Vista (which looks north), and 1.8 miles (2.9 km) from the park to Cherry Springs Vista (which looks south). The Cherry Springs fire tower is 1.9 miles (3.1 km) south of the park, just south of Cherry Springs vista. Coudersport is 15 miles (24 km) northwest of the park along Route 44, and the Cherry Springs "Class B" public campground was about 11 miles (18 km) from Coudersport, or about 4 miles (6.4 km) from the current park. As of 2009 this area is part of the state forest, but does not have any park facilities. The United States Geological Survey topographic map (Ayers Hill quadrant) does show a "Little Cherry Springs Park" in this area. Patterson State Park is a short distance northwest of the site of Little Cherry Springs Park, and it is 6.5 miles (10.5 km) along PA 44 from Patterson to the Cherry Springs vista.
