= West Branch Pine Creek =

Creek in Pennsylvania, US

Coordinates: 41.688298°N 77.820707°W

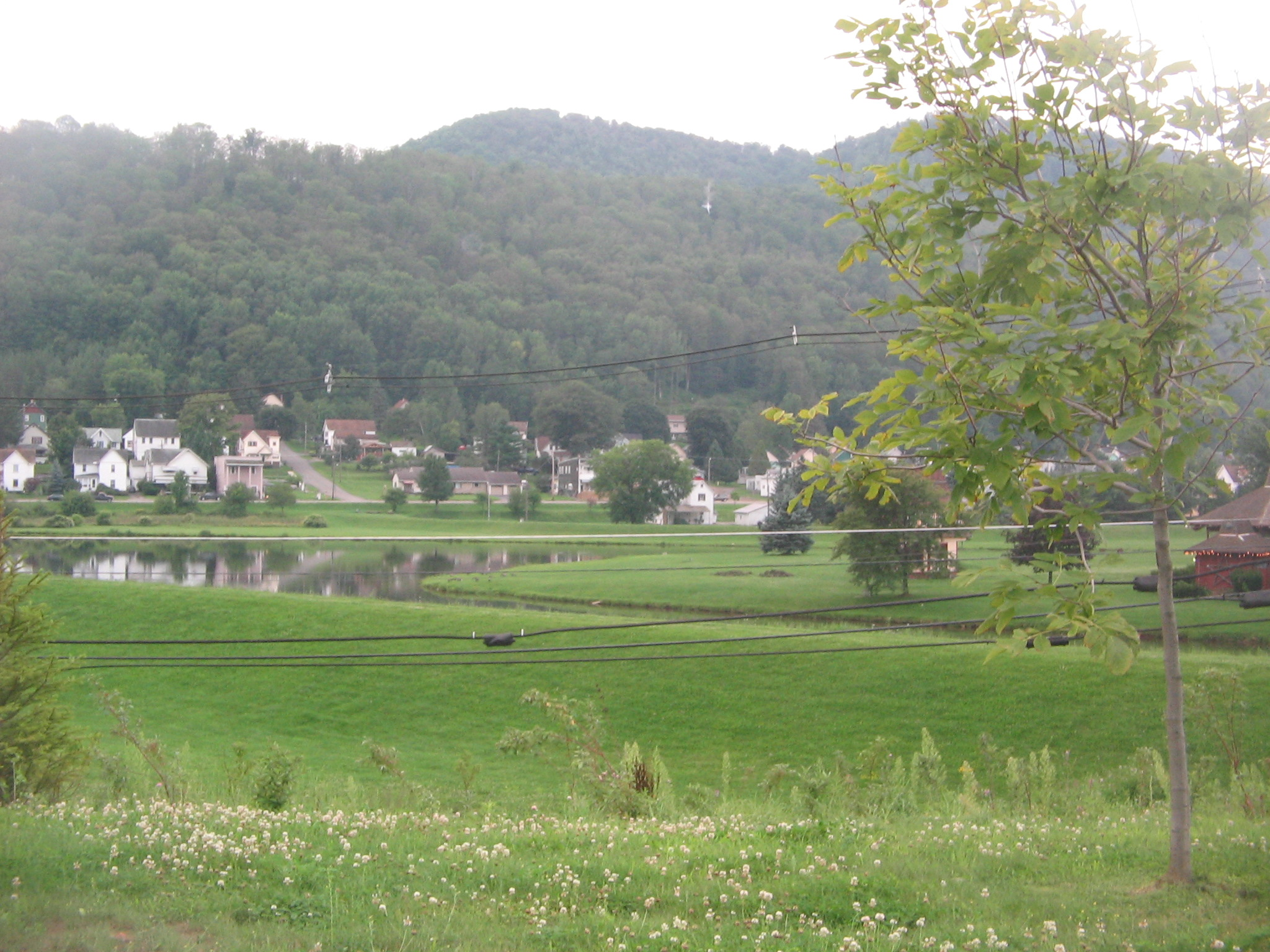
The confluence of the West Branch Pine Creek (right) and Pine Creek in Galeton

West Branch Pine Creek is a tributary of Pine Creek in Potter County, in Pennsylvania, in the United States. It is approximately 17.0 miles (27.4 km) long and flows through Summit Township, West Branch Township, and Galeton.

== Course ==
West Branch Pine Creek begins in Summit Township. It flows east-southeast for approximately half a mile before turning southeast in a valley. After several miles, the creek briefly turns east for a short distance before entering West Branch Township. It then turns southeast again before turning roughly east-northeast and receiving the tributary Hopper House Hollow. Slightly further downstream, the creek receives the tributary Sunken Branch. It picks up the tributaries Indian Run and Lyman Run and continues in approximately the same direction as its valley widens. The creek receives several more tributaries before entering the community of Galeton. After a few tenths of a mile, it reaches its confluence with Pine Creek.

== Geography ==
West Branch Pine Creek is fairly similar to the upper reaches of Pine Creek. The valley of West Branch Pine Creek is fairly narrow and contains forests, pastures, abandoned farms, and some houses and camps. there are strainers and possibly some fences on the creek.

West Branch Pine Creek lacks a gauging station.

== Recreation ==
It is possible to canoe on 6.9 miles (11.1 km) of West Branch Pine Creek during snowmelt and within four days of heavy rain. The difficulty rating of the creek is 2 and it is considered to be suitable for novice canoers. Edward Gertler describes the scenery along it as "good" in his book Keystone Canoeing.

== See also ==
- List of rivers of Pennsylvania
