= Patterson State Park =

State park in Pennsylvania, United States

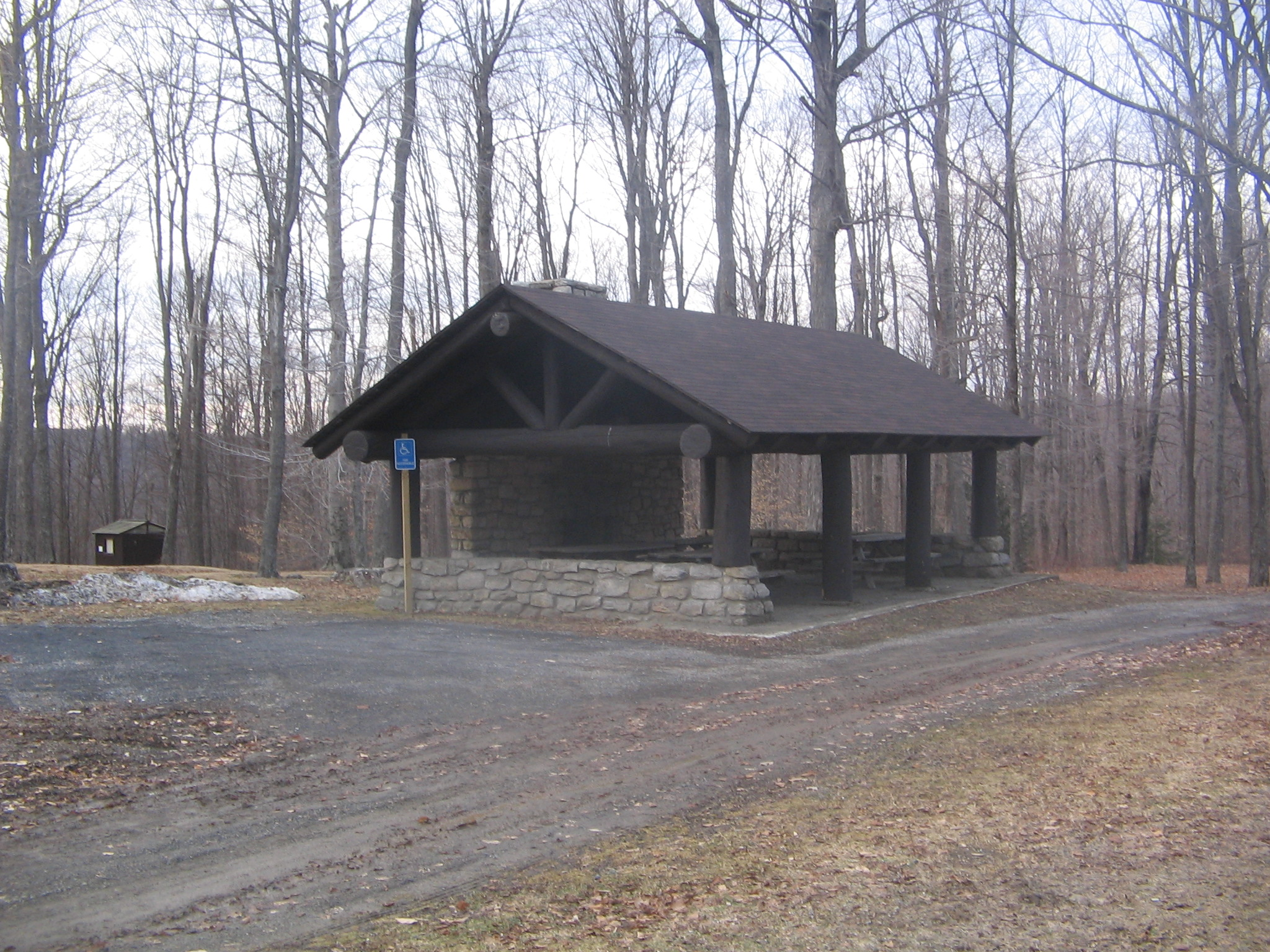
- The larger of the CCC-built picnic pavilions in the park

- Location within Pennsylvania Location within the United States
- Interactive map of Patterson State Park
- Location: Summit Township, Potter County, Pennsylvania, United States
- Coordinates: 41°41′46″N 77°53′37″W
- Area: 19.05 acres (7.71 ha)
- Elevation: 2,480 feet (760 m)
- Established: 1925
- Administrator: Pennsylvania Department of Conservation and Natural Resources
- Website: Official website
- Pennsylvania State Parks

Patterson State Park is a Pennsylvania state park on 19 acres (7.7 ha) that are located in Summit Township, Potter County, Pennsylvania in the United States. The park is on Pennsylvania Route 44 near Sweden Valley. The park has two rustic roadside pavilions.

== History ==
The Pennsylvania Department of Forestry created "Patterson Picnic Area" from 1922 to 1925. During the Great Depression, the Civilian Conservation Corps built two pavilions in the current picnic area from 1935 to 1941. Patterson State Park officially became part of the Pennsylvania State Parks system in 1950. The name is thought to come from people who lived in the area named Patterson, but there are no records of anyone named Patterson owning the land that is now part of the state park. In 2000 the park became part of the Hills Creek State Park complex, an administrative grouping of eight state parks in Potter and Tioga counties.

== Recreation ==
Patterson State Park is surrounded by Susquehannock State Forest. Visitors use the park as a trail head for hiking, cross-country skiing, mountain biking, and snowmobiling. The Susquehannock Trail System, an 85-mile (137 km) loop almost entirely on state forest land, passes through the park. A mountain bike trail begins at Denton Hill State Park and runs 15 miles (24 km) as it passes through Patterson State Park on its way to Cherry Springs State Park. Overnight camping in tents is permitted at the park.
