= Susquehannock State Forest =

State forest in Pennsylvania, United States

- IUCN category VI (protected area with sustainable use of natural resources)
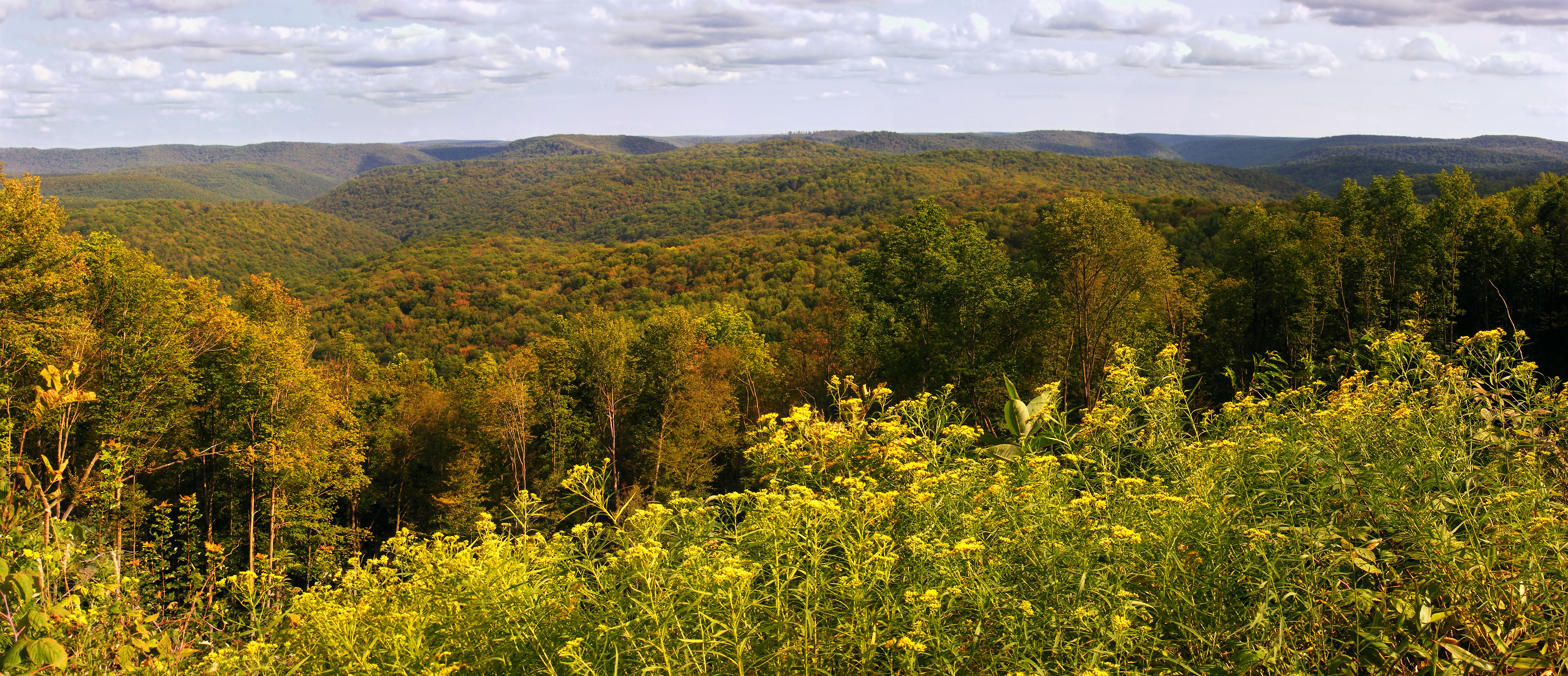
- Susquehannock State Forest, Potter County, as seen from Little Lyman Vista

- Location within Pennsylvania
- Location: Pennsylvania, United States
- Coordinates: 41°46′26″N 78°01′07″W
- Governing body: Pennsylvania Department of Conservation and Natural Resources
- Website: Susquehannock State Forest

Susquehannock State Forest is a Pennsylvania state forest in Pennsylvania Bureau of Forestry District #15. The main office is located in Coudersport in Potter County, Pennsylvania in the United States.

Susquehannock State Forest is located chiefly in Potter County, with small tracts in McKean and Clinton Counties. The forest is named for the Susquehannocks, a Native American tribe who once lived in the Susquehanna River basin. Forrest H. Dutlinger Natural Area and Hammersley Wild Area (the second largest roadless area in the state) receive extra protection. The state forest hosts the Susquehannock Trail System, an 83-mile (134 km) loop hiking trail almost entirely on state forest land.

== History ==
Susquehannock State Forest was formed as a direct result of the depletion of the forests of Pennsylvania that took place during the mid-to-late 19th century. American conservationists like Dr. Joseph Rothrock became concerned that the forests would not regrow if they were not managed properly. Lumber and Iron companies had harvested the old-growth forests for various reasons. They clear cut the forests and left behind nothing but dried tree tops and rotting stumps. The situation was exacerbated as often sparks of passing steam locomotives ignited wildfires that prevented the formation of second growth forests.

The conservationists feared that the forest would never regrow if there was not a change in the philosophy of forest management— such as those measures which had been for some years making news in Europe and India. Knowledge of Forest management practices among the well-informed, then being long in place in France and Germany added impetus to pay attention to the changes signaled by Great Britain's legislative actions. The American leaders across many states began calling for their states to purchase land from the lumber and iron companies. In the day in Pennsylvania, the lumber and iron companies were more than willing to sell their land since they had depleted the natural resources of the forests, more commercially valuable iron mines were providing ores, and selling the lands eliminated the annual need to pay property taxes. These demands of this movement were later recognized by sociologists and historians as one earmark of the Progressive Era in United States politics and social reorganization.

The changes began to take place in 1895 when Dr. Rothrock was appointed the first commissioner of the Pennsylvania Department of Forests and Waters, the forerunner of today's Pennsylvania Department of Conservation and Natural Resources. The Pennsylvania General Assembly passed a piece of legislation in 1897 that authorized the purchase of "unseated lands for forest reservations". This was the beginning of the State Forest system.

== Nearby state parks ==
Seven Pennsylvania State Parks are in or near Susquehannock State Forest:

- Cherry Springs State Park
- Denton Hill State Park
- Lyman Run State Park
- Ole Bull State Park
- Patterson State Park
- Prouty Place State Park
- Sizerville State Park

== Neighboring state forest districts ==
The U.S. state of New York is to the north

- Tioga State Forest (east)
- Tiadaghton State Forest (southeast)
- Sproul State Forest (south)
- Elk State Forest (south)
- Cornplanter State Forest (west)
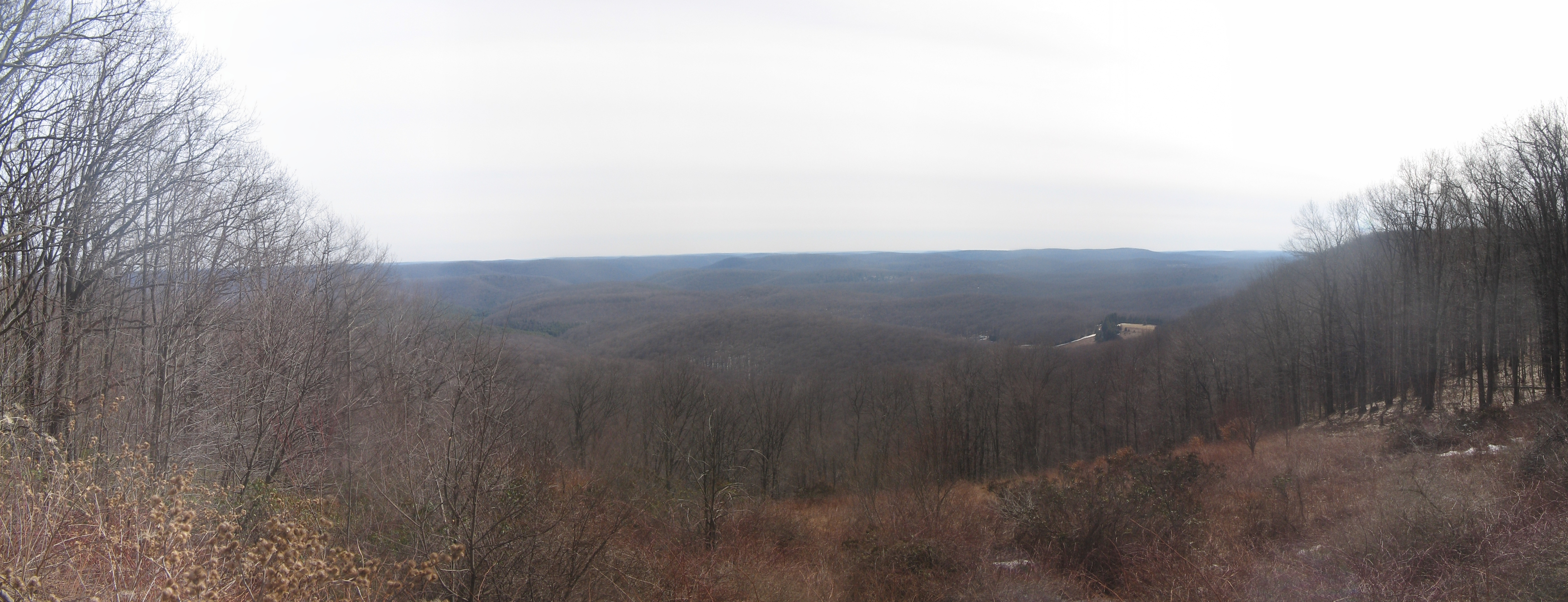
Panoramic view of the forest from Cherry Springs Vista. The level horizon is typical of a dissected plateau, here the Allegheny Plateau
