= Denton Hill State Park =

State park in Potter County, Pennsylvania

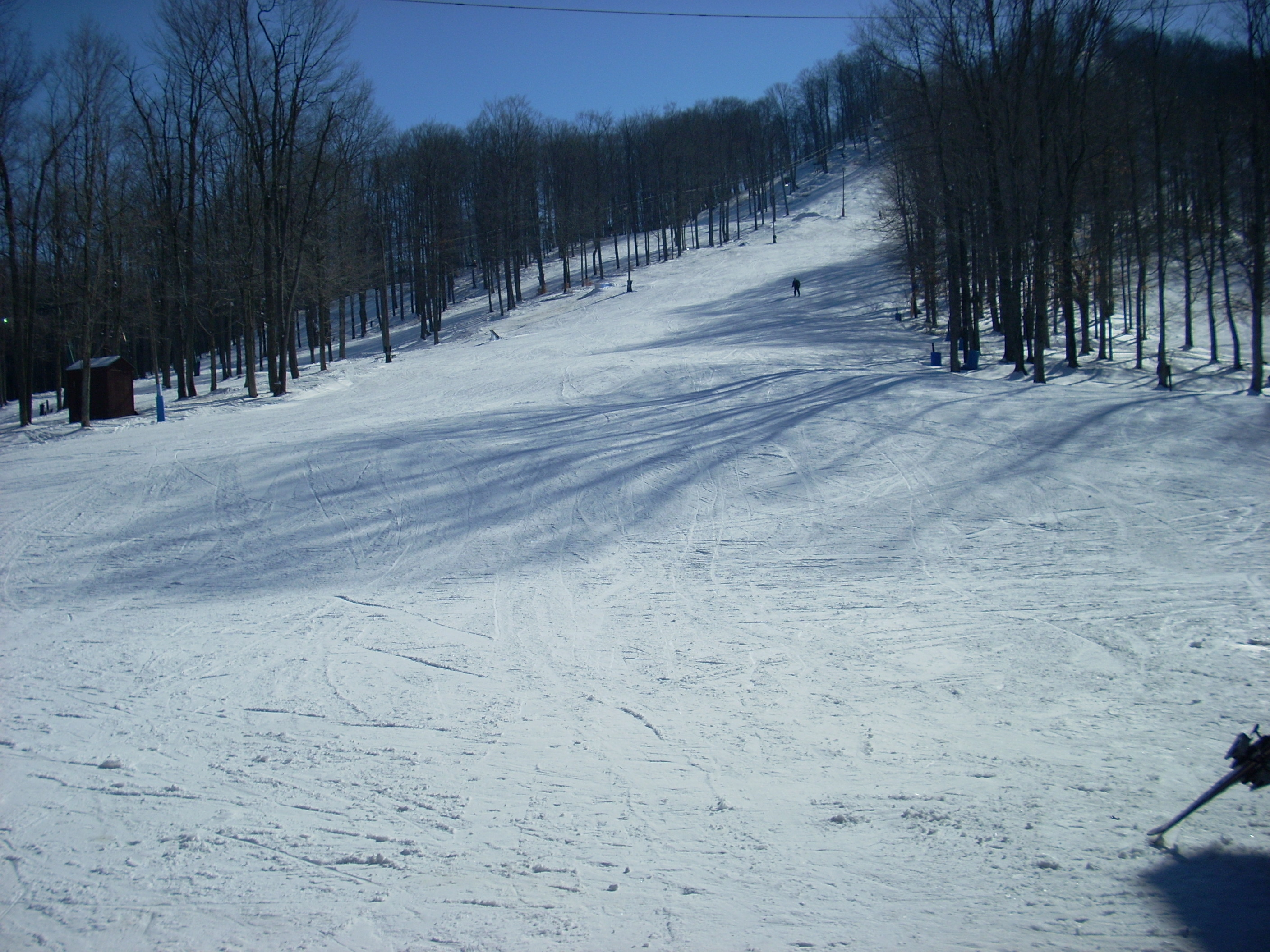
- The ski slopes at Denton Hill State Park

- Location within Pennsylvania Location within the United States
- Location: Potter County, Pennsylvania, United States
- Coordinates: 41°46′41″N 77°49′40″W
- Area: 700 acres (280 ha)
- Elevation: 1,800–2,400 feet (550–730 m)
- Established: 1951
- Administrator: Pennsylvania Department of Conservation and Natural Resources
- Website: Official website

Denton Hill State Park is a 700-acre (283 ha) Pennsylvania state park in Ulysses Township, Potter County, Pennsylvania, in the United States. The park is a downhill skiing resort. Denton Hill State Park is on U.S. Route 6 between Coudersport and Galeton. In 2000 the park became part of the Hills Creek State Park complex, an administrative grouping of eight state parks in Potter and Tioga counties.

== History ==
Denton Hill State Park was the first ski operation run by the Pennsylvania Department of Forests and Waters (a predecessor to the Pennsylvania Department of Conservation and Natural Resources). The park was established in 1951, opened in 1959, and the lodge and ski area were built between 1958 and 1967. The ski area was operated by the state until 1979, when it became a concession run by a private contractor ("Ski Denton" as of 2011). The park was closed to downhill skiing in late 2014, when the concession contract expired.

The skiing ranged from easy, beginner slopes to some of the most dangerous, expert, black diamond slopes on the east coast of the United States. There are four ski lifts at the park, each of which stops at a different elevation on the slopes. Lift-accessed Snow tubing is also available at Denton Hill State Park, or Ski Denton.

There are five chalets on the grounds of Ski Denton. Each cabin has wall to wall carpeting and two bedrooms that sleep up to six individuals. There is a large living room with a cathedral ceiling in each cabin. The cabins also have a full kitchen, dining room, and bathroom. A hostel style bunkhouse sits atop the main lodge.

Ski Denton opens its slopes and trails for mountain bikers in the off season; when the lifts were running, bikers could use those to get to the top of the slopes. There are over 50 miles (80 km) of maintained downhill and cross-country single track and trails available for riding. A mountain bike trail begins at Denton Hill State Park and is 15 miles (24 km) long, passing through Patterson State Park on its way to Cherry Springs State Park. Part of the Susquehannock Trail System, an 85-mile (137 km) loop hiking trail, forms the southern border of the park.

== New Developments ==
The state has completed a study on what improvements to the park facilities would be needed to fully re-open the park, and as of late 2023, was working with a local company, Denton Go, LLC, to re-open the park as a four-season resort. Denton Go plans to open the park for overnight camping with several RV sites along the 9-mile creek, as well as various outdoor activities such as hiking, biking, and downhill sports. The team also plans to offer UTV rentals and reopen the original cabin sites, which are expected to be ready in the late summer of 2024.

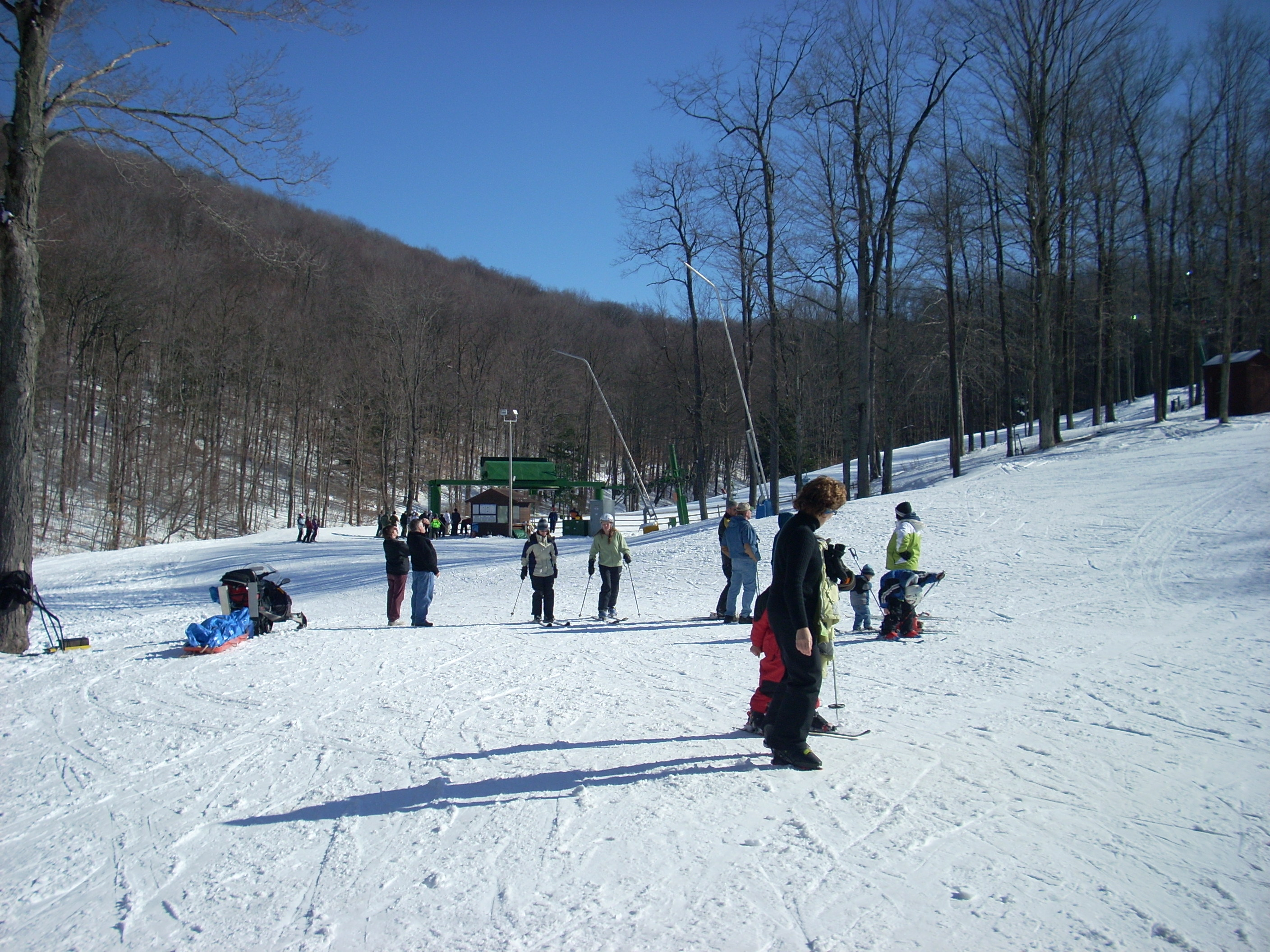
The beginners slope at Denton Hill State Park
