= Prouty Place State Park =

Park in Pennsylvania, United States of America

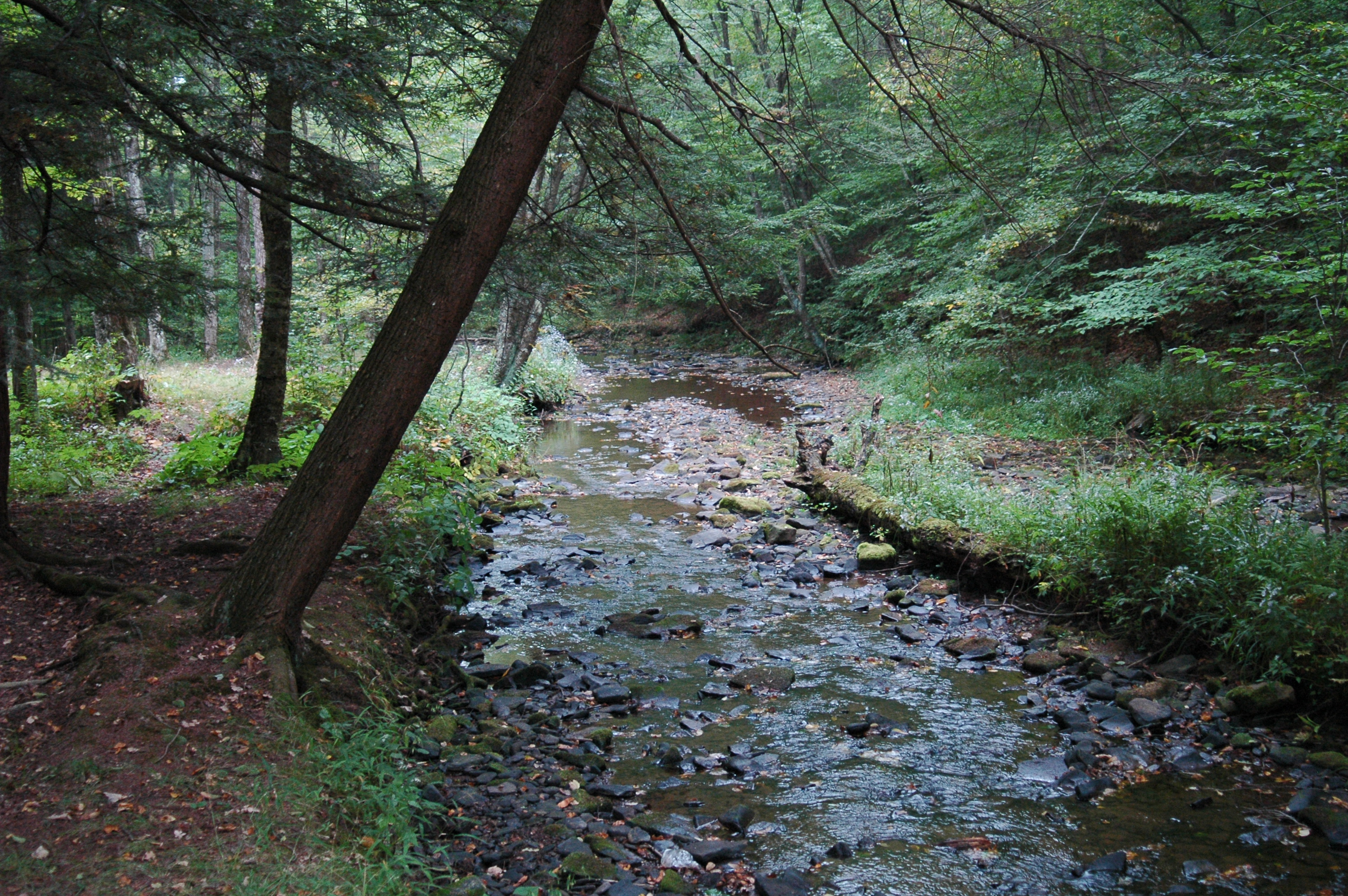

- Location within Pennsylvania Location within the United States
- Interactive map of Prouty Place State Park
- Location: Summit Township, Potter County, Pennsylvania, United States
- Coordinates: 41°39′26″N 77°54′50″W
- Area: 5 acres (2.0 ha)
- Elevation: 1,631 feet (497 m)
- Established: 1925
- Administrator: Pennsylvania Department of Conservation and Natural Resources
- Website: Official website
- Pennsylvania State Parks

Prouty Place State Park is a Pennsylvania state park on 5 acres (2 ha) in Summit Township, Potter County, Pennsylvania in the United States. The park is 5 miles (8 km) southwest of Pennsylvania Route 44, along Prouty Road near the junction with Long Toe Road, near Sweden Valley. The park provides access points for hiking, hunting and fishing in the Susquehannock State Forest. It is a small rest area for hikers and other travellers to the wilds of Potter County.

Prouty Place was designated a Class "B" campground by the Pennsylvania Department of Forestry from 1922 to 1925. During the Great Depression, the Civilian Conservation Corps built the current picnic area and former campsites between 1935 and 1938. Prouty Place State Park officially became part of the Pennsylvania State Parks system in 1957. The park is a short distance from the Susquehannock Trail System, and is connected to it by a link trail.

In 2000 the park became part of the Hills Creek State Park complex, an administrative grouping of eight state parks in Potter and Tioga counties. As of 2009, Prouty Place State Park is tied for second smallest state park in Pennsylvania (Upper Pine Bottom State Park, a picnic area to the southeast in Lycoming County, is also only 5 acres (2 ha)). Only Sand Bridge State Park (another picnic area) is smaller. Since the 2010s, the park includes no developed or maintained facilities, and offers only back country camping and access to nearby hiking trails and hunting/fishing areas.
