= Lyman Run State Park =

State park in Pennsylvania, United States

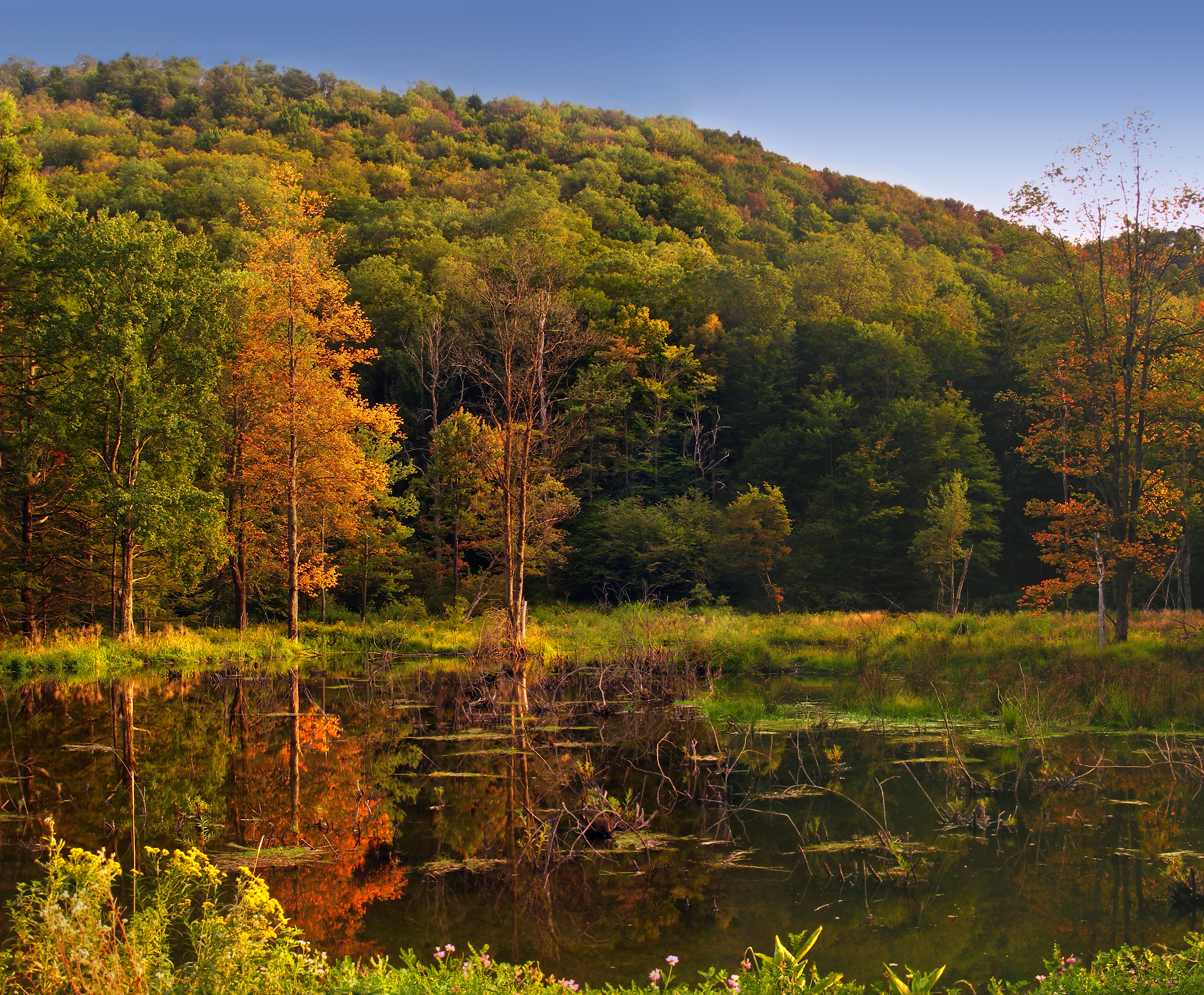

- Location within Pennsylvania Location within the United States
- Interactive map of Lyman Run State Park
- Location: Potter County, Pennsylvania, United States
- Coordinates: 41°43′30″N 77°45′36″W
- Area: 595 acres (241 ha)
- Elevation: 1,690 feet (520 m)
- Established: 1951
- Administrator: Pennsylvania Department of Conservation and Natural Resources
- Named for: Major Isaac Lyman
- Website: Official website
- Pennsylvania State Parks

Lyman Run State Park is a 595-acre (241 ha) Pennsylvania state park in Ulysses and West Branch Townships in Potter County, Pennsylvania in the United States. Lyman Run Lake is a 45-acre (18 ha) man-made lake within the park, surrounded by a northern hardwood forest of mainly maple and cherry trees. Lyman Run State Park is 7 miles (11 km) west of Galeton and 15 miles (24 km) east of Coudersport, and is nearly completely surrounded by the Susquehannock State Forest.

== History ==
=== Major Isaac Lyman ===
Lyman Run State Park is named for the creek that runs through it, which is dammed to form Lyman Run Lake. Major Isaac Lyman, an American Revolutionary War veteran was one of the first permanent settlers in Potter County. Major Lyman is recognized as the founder of Potter County. He was paid ten dollars for each settler that he convinced to move to Potter County. He built his home in 1809 in nearby Lymansville, now known as Ladonna. Major Lyman also built the first road to cross Potter County and the county's first sawmill and gristmill.

Lyman had a colorful personal history. Isaac was married three times and had 17 children. His first wife (Sally Edgecomb Lyman) died in 1791. He divorced his second wife (Laura Pierce Lyman) and started a third family in Potter County with his third wife (Patience Mann Spafford Lyman). The second Mrs. Lyman was determined not to suffer on her own. She sought out the Major, traveled to Potter County, with the help of her son, Burrell who was 18 at the time, and settled. Major Lyman lived with his two families in Potter County. Historical accounts of the living situation vary. Some say that Lyman kept both wives under one roof. Others state that there were two log homes for the families on the same piece of property. The descendants of Major Isaac Lyman still live and work in Potter County.

=== The lumber era ===
The Lyman Run area was part of the massive lumbering operation that occurred in most of north central Pennsylvania in the 1880s and 1890s. The land near Lyman Run was purchased by Frank and Charles Goodyear. The Goodyear brothers owned a railroad and lumber company that harvested the old-growth white pine and hemlock. These logs were floated down Lyman Run to the log boom at Williamsport by way of the West Branch of Pine Creek, then Pine Creek itself, and finally the West Branch Susquehanna River.

=== Modern era ===
In the 1930s, a Civilian Conservation Corps camp was built at what later became Lyman Run State Park. The grounds of the former CCC camp became a prisoner of war camp toward the end of World War II, with German prisoners of war detained by the U.S. Military there. In 1951, construction began on the state park facilities. In 2000 the park became part of the Hills Creek State Park complex, an administrative grouping of eight state parks in Potter and Tioga counties.

== Recreation ==
=== Camping, picnics, and hiking ===
Camping at both modern and rustic campsites is available at Lyman Run State Park. There are twenty-nine campsites equipped with electricity for RV's. Each site has a fire ring, picnic table and lantern hanger. There is a sanitary dump station at the campground. Those interested in camping out in tents may use one of six walk-in rustic camping areas. These locations have outhouses and hand-operated water pumps.

The entrance sign for Lyman Run State Park

In addition to the picnic tables at the campsites, Lyman Run State Park has a central, shaded picnic area. There are charcoal grills, outhouses, and a play area. Drinking water is available at hand-operated pumps. There is one picnic pavilion on the grounds.

Lyman Run State Park has 6 miles (9.7 km) of hiking trails, which connect with the much larger system of trails in the adjoining Susquehannock State Forest. It is a northern access point for the Susquehannock Trail System (STS), an 85-mile (137 km) loop trail almost entirely on state forest land. The STS runs 1.5 miles (2.4 km) west of the park, and is reached via an access trail from the southwest end of the lake.

=== Hunting ===
Hunting is permitted on about 505 acres (204 ha) of Lyman Run State Park. Hunters are expected to follow the rules and regulations of the Pennsylvania Game Commission. The common game species are ruffed grouse, squirrels, wild turkey, white-tailed deer, and black bears. The hunting of groundhogs is not permitted at the park. Many more acres of forested woodlands are available for hunting on the grounds of the adjacent Susquehannock State Forest.

=== Lyman Run Lake ===
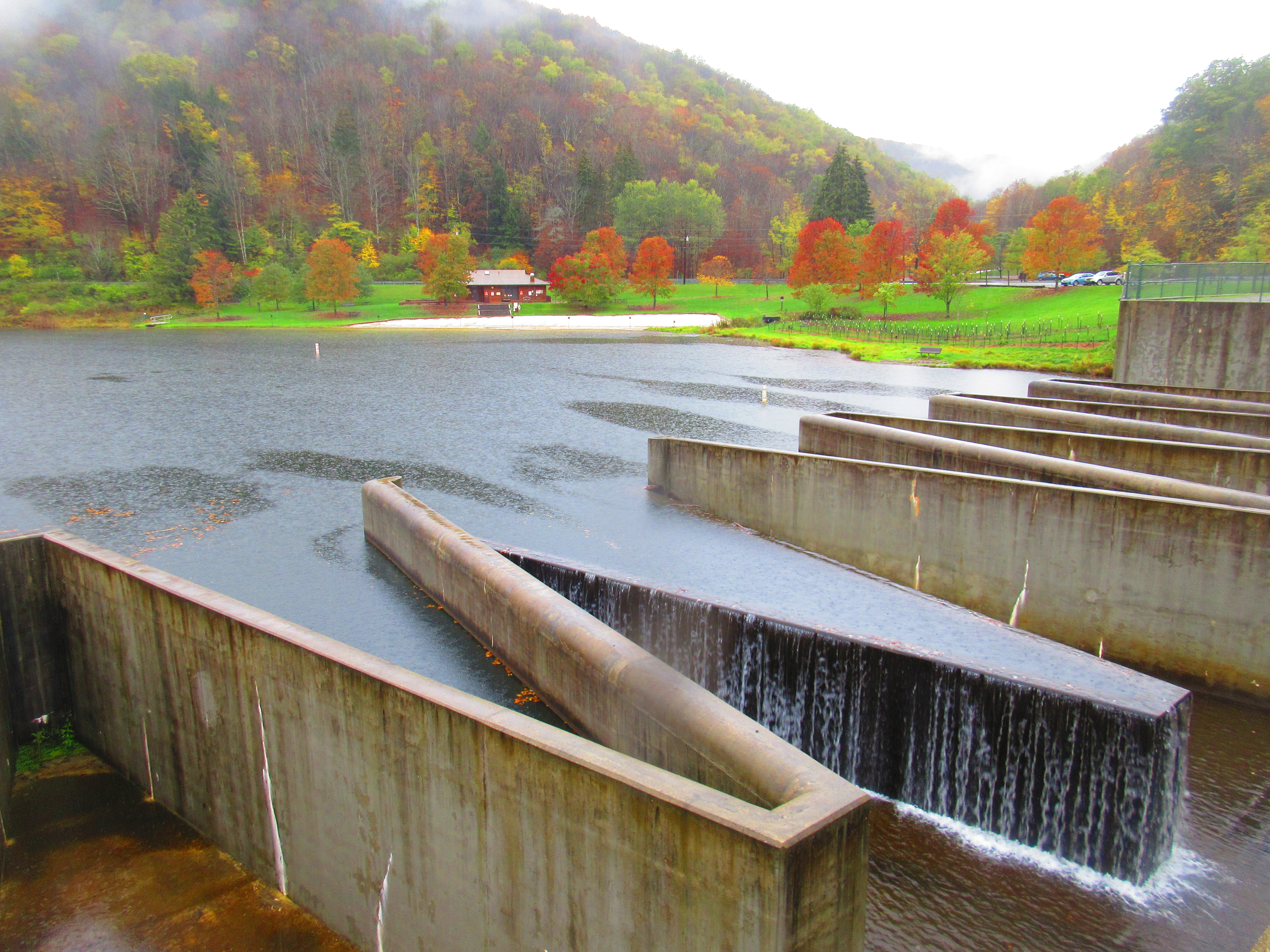
Spillway, lake, and bathhouse.

Boating with gas powered motors is prohibited on Lyman Run Lake. Motorized boats must be powered by electric motors only. Rowboats, canoes and kayaks are permitted on the waters of the lake. All boats must be properly registered with the state.

Lyman Run Lake is a popular fishing lake, with exceptional water quality. The Pennsylvania Fish and Boat commission stocks the lake with rainbow and palomino trout during the fishing season.

In winter, ice fishing for trout is permitted. The thickness of the ice is not monitored, but should be at least 4 inches (10 cm) thick before venturing out on it. Ice skating is allowed when the ice is thick enough, but limited to the beach area.

Swimming is permitted in Lyman Run Lake. The swimming season opens on Memorial Day weekend and concludes on Labor Day weekend. Beginning in 2008 lifeguards will not be posted at the beach.
