= Galeton, Pennsylvania =

Borough in Pennsylvania, US

- Borough
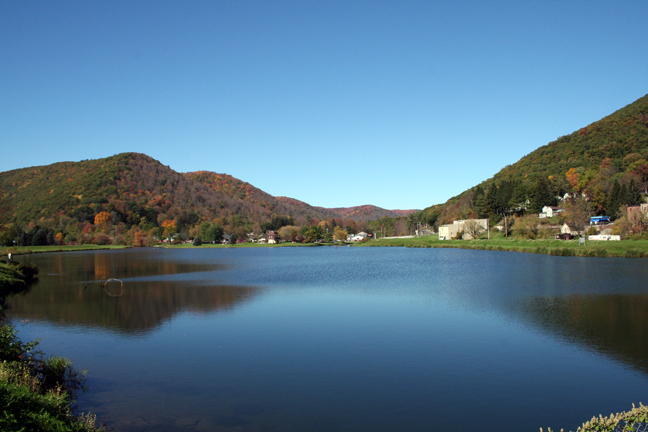
- Berger Lake

- Location of Galeton in Potter County, Pennsylvania

- Location within the U.S. state of Pennsylvania Galeton (the United States)
- Coordinates: 41°43′56″N 77°38′41″W
- Country: United States
- State: Pennsylvania
- County: Potter
- Settled: 1810
- Incorporated (borough): 1896

Area
  - Total: 1.29 sq mi (3.35 km^{2})
  - Land: 1.27 sq mi (3.29 km^{2})
  - Water: 0.023 sq mi (0.06 km^{2})
- Elevation (borough benchmark): 1,315 ft (401 m)
- Highest elevation (northern boundary of borough): 2,140 ft (650 m)
- Lowest elevation (Pine Creek): 1,298 ft (396 m)

Population (2020)
  - Total: 990
  - Density: 779.0/sq mi (300.78/km^{2})
- Time zone: Eastern (EST)
  - Summer (DST): EDT
- ZIP Code: 16922
- Area code: 814
- FIPS code: 42-28280
- Website: boroughofgaleton.org

Galeton is a borough in Potter County, Pennsylvania. It is located 50 miles (80 km) southeast of Bradford, Pennsylvania. Light industries, including knitting mills and a tannery have existed in Galeton. The population declined to 993 people in 2020.

== Geography ==
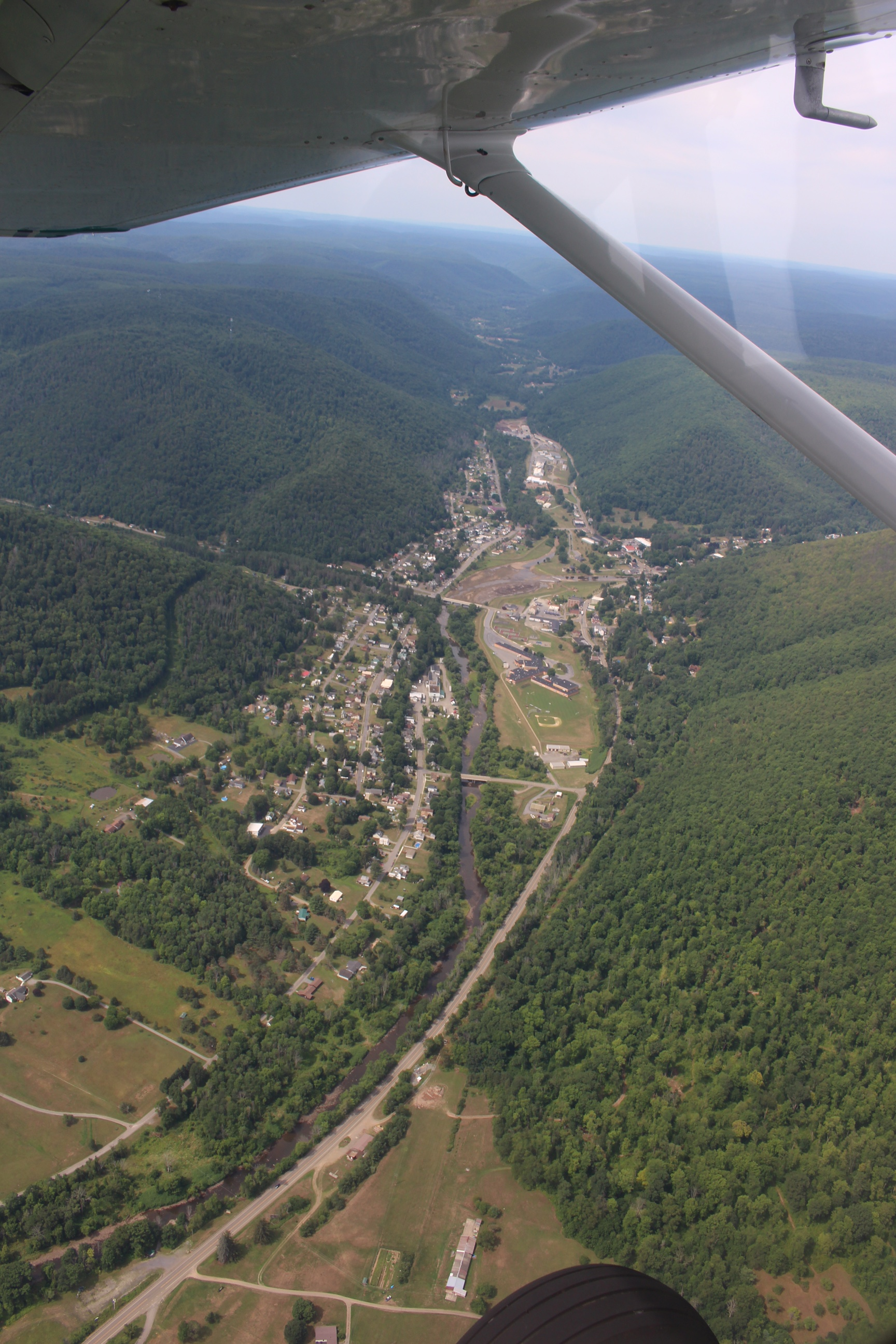
Aerial view of Galeton

Galeton is located at 41°43′56″N 77°38′41″W (41.732267, −77.644646). It is almost completely surrounded by Pike Township, with a small portion of the southwestern corner abutting West Branch Township.

According to the U.S. Census Bureau, the borough has a total area of 0.7 square miles (1.8 km^{2}), of which 0.7 square miles (1.8 km^{2}) is land and 1.41% is water.

The town is located near Cherry Springs State Park, an area that is home to some of the darkest skies on the U.S. East Coast, making the town and the surrounding areas a tourist destination.

== Demographics ==
Historical population
Census	Pop.	Note	%±
1900	2,415		—
1910	4,027		66.7%
1920	2,969		−26.3%
1930	2,200		−25.9%
1940	1,820		−17.3%
1950	1,646		−9.6%
1960	1,646		0.0%
1970	1,552		−5.7%
1980	1,462		−5.8%
1990	1,370		−6.3%
2000	1,325		−3.3%
2010	1,149		−13.3%
2020	990		−13.8%
2021 (est.)	983	▼	−0.7%

As of the 2000 census, of 2000, there were 1,325 people, 513 households, and 347 families residing in the borough. The population density was 1,893.8 inhabitants per square mile (731.2/km^{2}). There were 608 housing units at an average density of 869.0 per square mile (335.5/km^{2}). The racial makeup of the borough was 97.36% White, 1.1% African American, 0.38% Native American, 0.50% Asian, 0.30% from other races, and 0.45% from two or more races. Hispanic or Latino of any race were 0.83% of the population.

There were 513 households, out of which 31.0% had children under the age of 18 living with them, 49.9% were married couples living together, 11.9% had a female householder with no husband present, and 32.2% were non-families. 27.5% of all households were made up of individuals, and 15.6% had someone living alone who was 65 years of age or older. The average household size was 2.48 and the average family size was 2.97.

In the borough, the population was spread out, with 25.3% under the age of 18, 6.6% from 18 to 24, 27.4% from 25 to 44, 18.7% from 45 to 64, and 22.0% who were 65 years of age or older. The median age was 40 years. For every 100 females there were 86.1 males. For every 100 females age 18 and over, there were 83.7 males.

The median income for a household in the borough was $27,727, and the median income for a family was $30,463. Males had a median income of $26,797 versus $18,487 for females. The per capita income for the borough was $13,095. About 9.7% of families and 13.6% of the population were below the poverty line, including 19.5% of those under age 18 and 7.5% of those age 65 or over.

== See also ==
- The Great Outdoors Conservancy
