= West Branch Township, Pennsylvania =

Township in Pennsylvania, US

Coordinates: 41°42′00″N 77°36′59″W

- Township
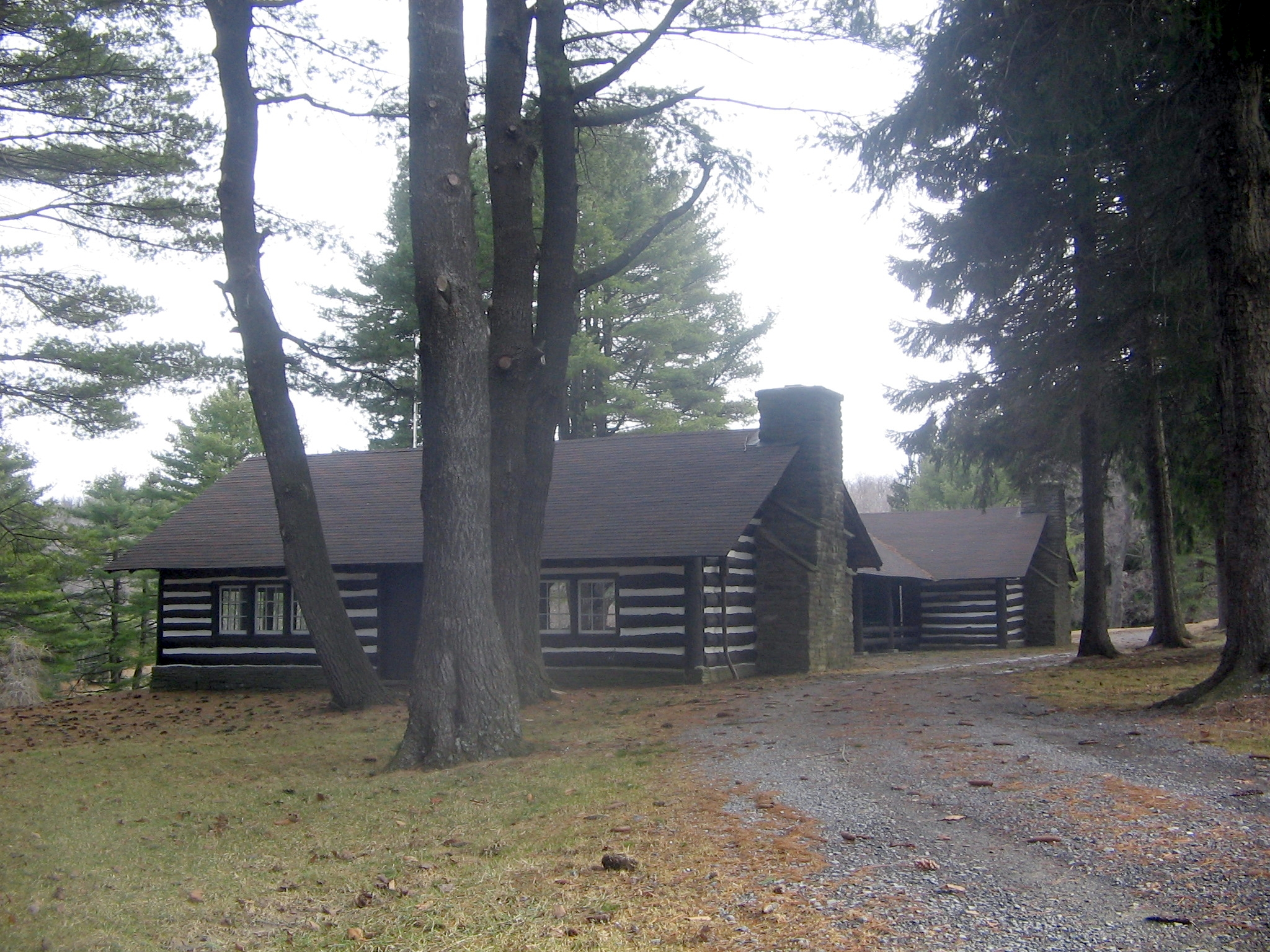
- Cherry Springs State Park in West Branch Township

- Seal

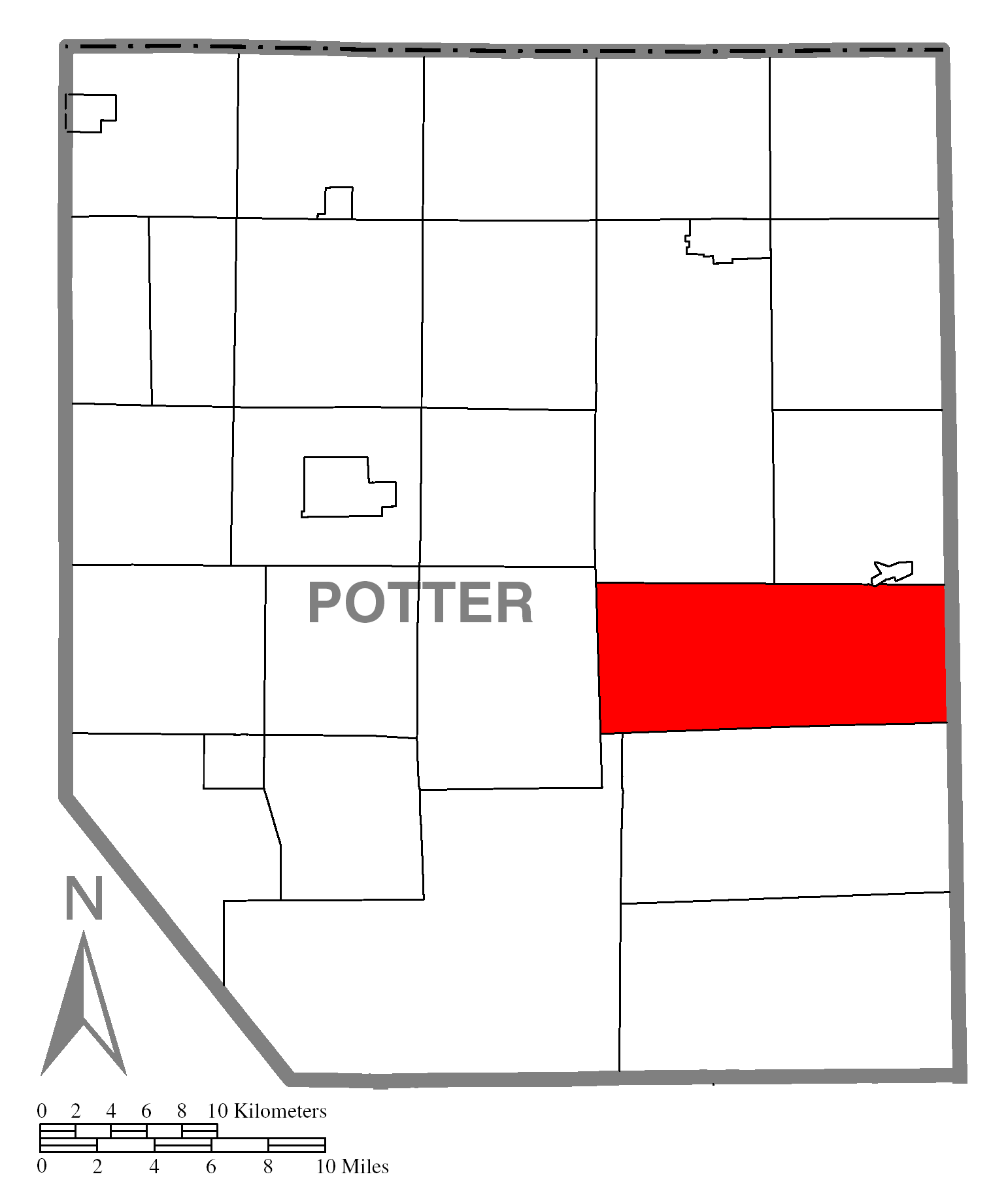
- Location of West Branch Township in Potter County, Pennsylvania
- Map of Potter County, Pennsylvania
- Country: United States
- State: Pennsylvania
- County: Potter
- Settled: 1835
- Incorporated: 1856

Area
  - Total: 62.18 sq mi (161.04 km^{2})
  - Land: 62.11 sq mi (160.87 km^{2})
  - Water: 0.066 sq mi (0.17 km^{2})

Population (2020)
  - Total: 399 ▲
  - Estimate (2021): 397
  - Density: 6.2/sq mi (2.4/km^{2})
- Time zone: UTC-5 (EST)
  - Summer (DST): UTC-4 (EDT)
- FIPS code: 42-105-82568
- Website: westbranchtwp.com

West Branch Township is a township in Potter County, Pennsylvania, United States. The population was 399 at the 2020 census. There are two Pennsylvania state parks in West Branch Township. Cherry Springs State Park is a popular destination for astronomical observation. Lyman Run State Park is in the northern part of the township and is partially in neighboring Ulysses Township.

== History ==
The Cherry Springs Picnic Pavilion was added to the National Register of Historic Places in 1987.

== Geography ==
According to the United States Census Bureau, the township has a total area of 62.7 square miles (162.4 km^{2}), of which 62.6 square miles (162.2 km^{2}) is land and 0.1 square mile (0.2 km^{2}) (0.11%) is water.

West Branch Township is bordered by Ulysses and Pike Townships to the north, Tioga County to the east, Abbott and Wharton Townships to the south and Summit Township to the west.

== Demographics ==
Historical population
Census	Pop.	Note	%±
2000	392		—
2010	393		0.3%
2020	399		1.5%
2021 (est.)	397		−0.5%
U.S. Decennial Census

As of the census of 2000, there were 392 people, 159 households, and 123 families residing in the township. The population density was 6.3 people per square mile (2.4/km^{2}). There were 669 housing units at an average density of 10.7/sq mi (4.1/km^{2}). The racial makeup of the township was 97.19% White, 1.28% Asian, and 1.53% from two or more races.

There were 159 households, out of which 21.4% had children under the age of 18 living with them, 70.4% were married couples living together, 2.5% had a female householder with no husband present, and 22.6% were non-families. 18.9% of all households were made up of individuals, and 11.3% had someone living alone who was 65 years of age or older. The average household size was 2.47 and the average family size was 2.72.

In the township the population was spread out, with 19.1% under the age of 18, 4.8% from 18 to 24, 22.4% from 25 to 44, 29.1% from 45 to 64, and 24.5% who were 65 years of age or older. The median age was 48 years. For every 100 females, there were 98.0 males. For every 100 females age 18 and over, there were 100.6 males.

The median income for a household in the township was $39,688, and the median income for a family was $43,750. Males had a median income of $34,750 versus $20,536 for females. The per capita income for the township was $17,214. About 9.8% of families and 12.4% of the population were below the poverty line, including 12.7% of those under age 18 and 14.7% of those age 65 or over.
