= Pennsylvania Route 155 =

State highway in Pennsylvania, US

Pennsylvania Route 155

Route information
- Maintained by PennDOT
- Length: 32.279 mi (51.948 km)

Major junctions
- South end: PA 120 in Emporium
- PA 607 in Keating Summit; US 6 in Port Allegany
- North end: PA 446 in Eldred Township

Location
- Country: United States
- State: Pennsylvania
- Counties: Cameron, Potter, McKean

Highway system
- Pennsylvania State Route System; Interstate; US; State; Scenic; Legislative
← PA 154	→ PA 156

Pennsylvania Route 155 (PA 155) is a 32.2-mile-long (51.8 km) state highway located in Cameron, Potter, and McKean counties in Pennsylvania. The southern terminus is at PA 120 in Emporium. The northern terminus is at PA 446 in Eldred Township.

== Route description ==
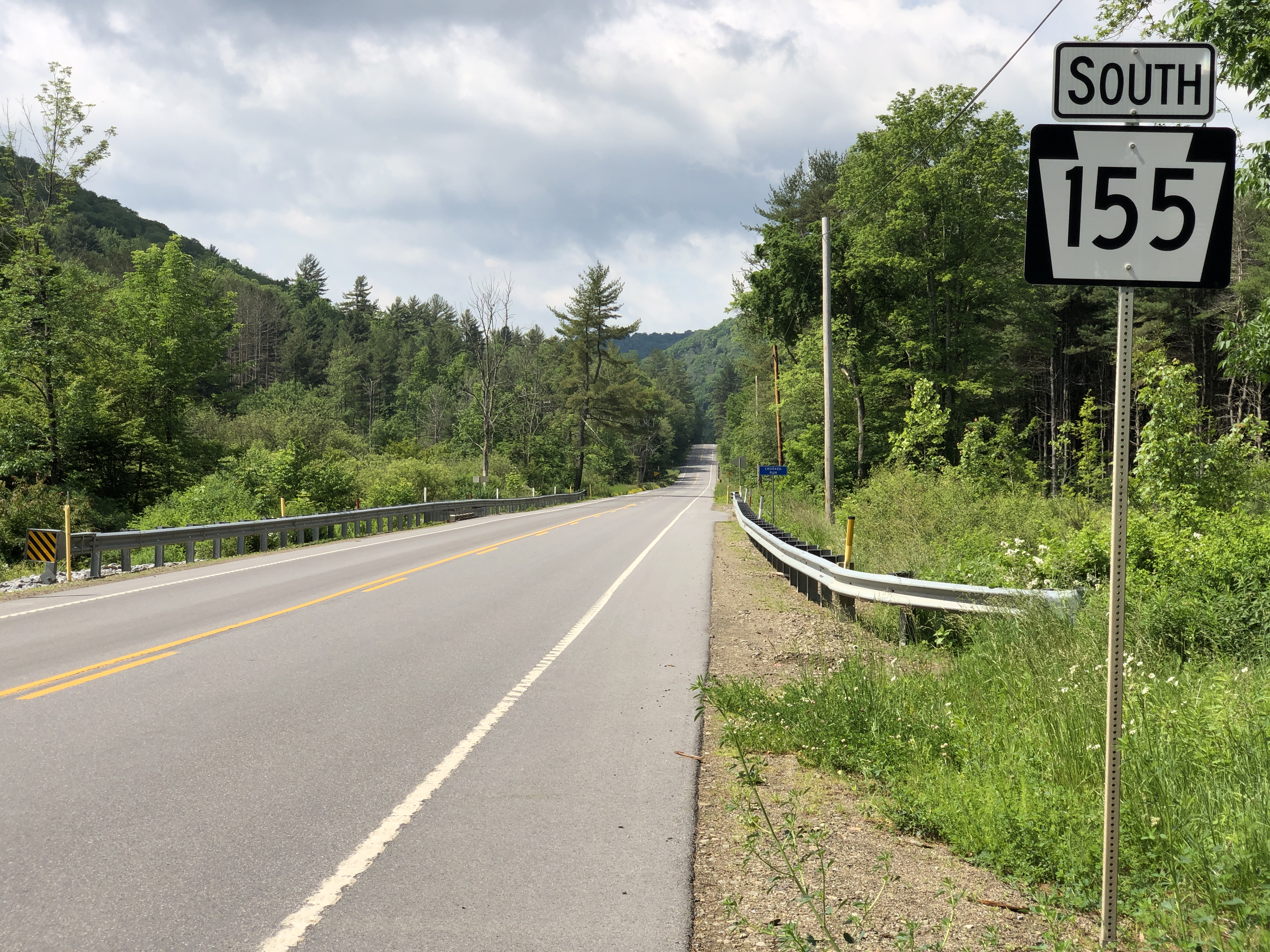
PA 155 southbound in Portage Township, Cameron County

PA 155 begins at an intersection with PA 120 in the community of Emporium Junction in Shippen Township, Cameron County, heading north on two-lane undivided Sizerville Road. The road passes businesses and homes, passing through Prospect Park. The route heads through forested areas with some fields and residences, running to the east of the Sinnemahoning Portage Creek and the Buffalo Line railroad line, which is owned by Norfolk Southern and operated by the Western New York and Pennsylvania Railroad. Farther north, PA 155 crosses the creek and heads to the north-northeast, continuing into Portage Township. Here, the route runs through small areas of agriculture before heading away from the creek and the railroad line and continuing into forests and passing to the west of Sizerville State Park.

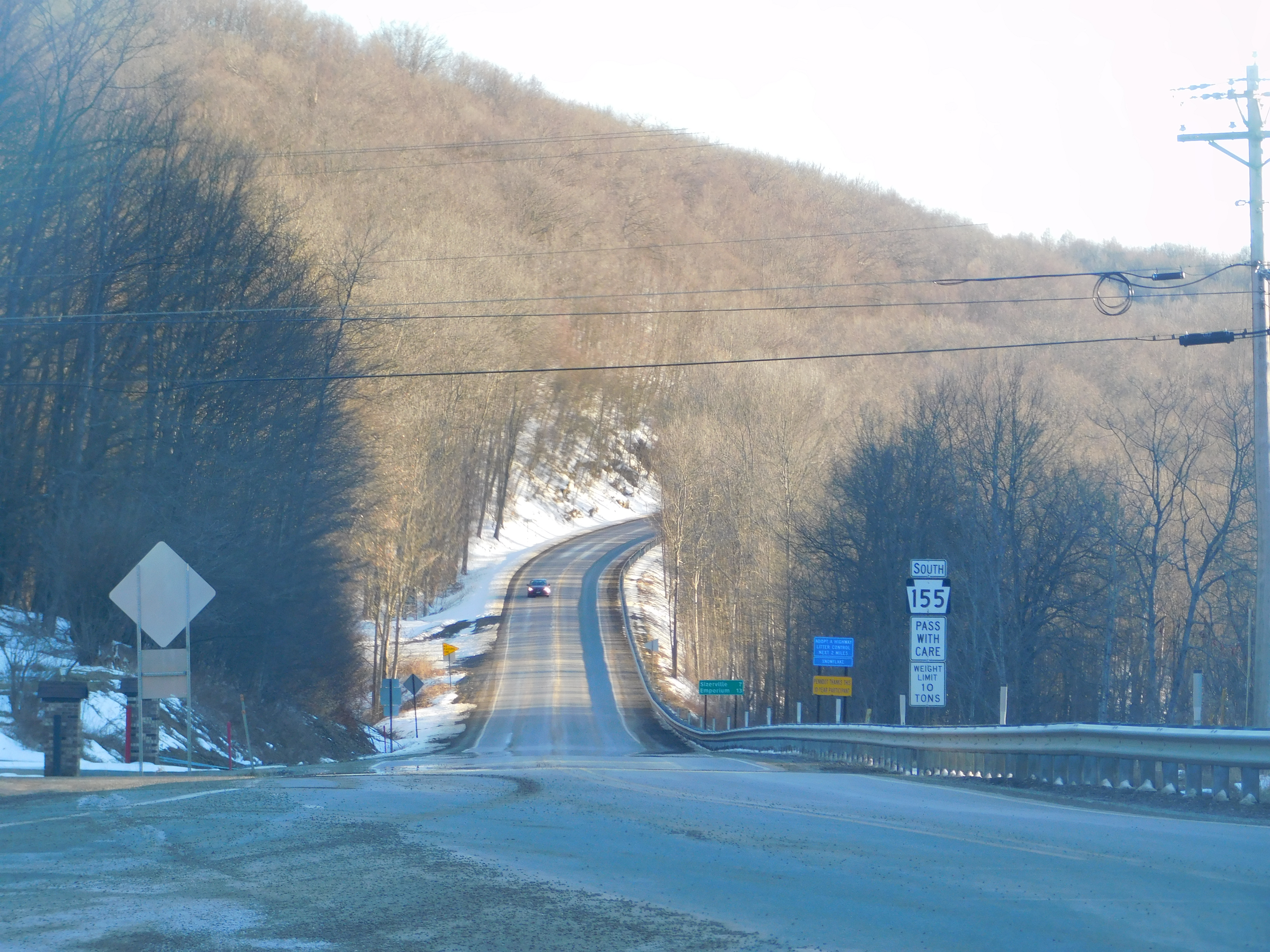
Looking south along PA 155 at Keating Summit

PA 155 enters Portage Township in Potter County and becomes an unnamed road, passing more of the state park before continuing north through the Elk State Forest. The road heads into Keating Township and heads north-northeast, running to the east of the Western New York and Pennsylvania Railroad line. In the community of Keating Summit, the route intersects the northern terminus of PA 607 and heads north-northwest through more forests with some fields, turning to the northwest.

PA 155 heads into Liberty Township in McKean County and becomes Port-Emporium Road, heading through more forested areas with some fields and residences, passing through Liberty. The route turns to the northwest and heads into more agricultural areas with some homes, with the Portage Creek and the railroad line a short distance to the west of the road. The road heads through Wrights and continues through more rural areas. Farther north, PA 155 crosses the Allegheny River into the borough of Port Allegany and comes to an intersection with U.S. Route 6 (US 6), turning northwest to form a concurrency with that route on South Main Street. The road passes homes, heading into the commercial downtown and becoming North Main Street. The two routes pass through more residential areas before US 6 splits from PA 155 by heading west on Grand Army of the Republic Highway. PA 155 heads back into Liberty Township and becomes Port-Turtlepoint Road, passing through a mix of farmland and woodland containing some homes, with the Allegheny River and the Western New York and Pennsylvania Railroad line located to the west of the road. The route heads into Annin Township and continues through more rural areas, passing through Turtlepoint, where it becomes Turtle Point-Larabee Road. The road runs through Sartwell and enters Eldred Township, continuing northwest through wooded areas with some fields and homes, ending at PA 446.

== Major intersections ==
County	Location	mi	km	Destinations	Notes
Cameron	Shippen Township	0.000	0.000	PA 120 (Allegany Avenue) – Renovo, Emporium, St. Marys	Southern terminus
Potter	Keating Township	12.694	20.429	PA 607 south – Austin	Northern terminus of PA 607
McKean	Port Allegany	23.250	37.417	US 6 east (Grand Army of the Republic Highway) – Coudersport	South end of US 6 concurrency
McKean	Port Allegany	24.392	39.255	US 6 west (Grand Army of the Republic Highway) – Smethport	North end of US 6 concurrency
McKean	Eldred Township	32.279	51.948	PA 446 – Eldred, Olean, Smethport	Northern terminus
1.000 mi = 1.609 km; 1.000 km = 0.621 mi: Concurrency terminus
