= Pennsylvania Route 607 =

State highway in Potter County, Pennsylvania, US

Pennsylvania Route 607

Route information
- Maintained by PennDOT
- Length: 6.76 mi (10.88 km)

Major junctions
- South end: PA 872 in Austin
- North end: PA 155 in Keating Township

Location
- Country: United States
- State: Pennsylvania
- Counties: Potter

Highway system
- Pennsylvania State Route System; Interstate; US; State; Scenic; Legislative
← PA 604	→ PA 611

Pennsylvania Route 607 (PA 607) is a 6.76-mile-long (10.88 km) state highway located in Potter County, Pennsylvania, United States. The southern terminus is at an intersection with PA 872 in Austin. The northern terminus is at a fork from PA 155 in Keating Township.

== Route description ==
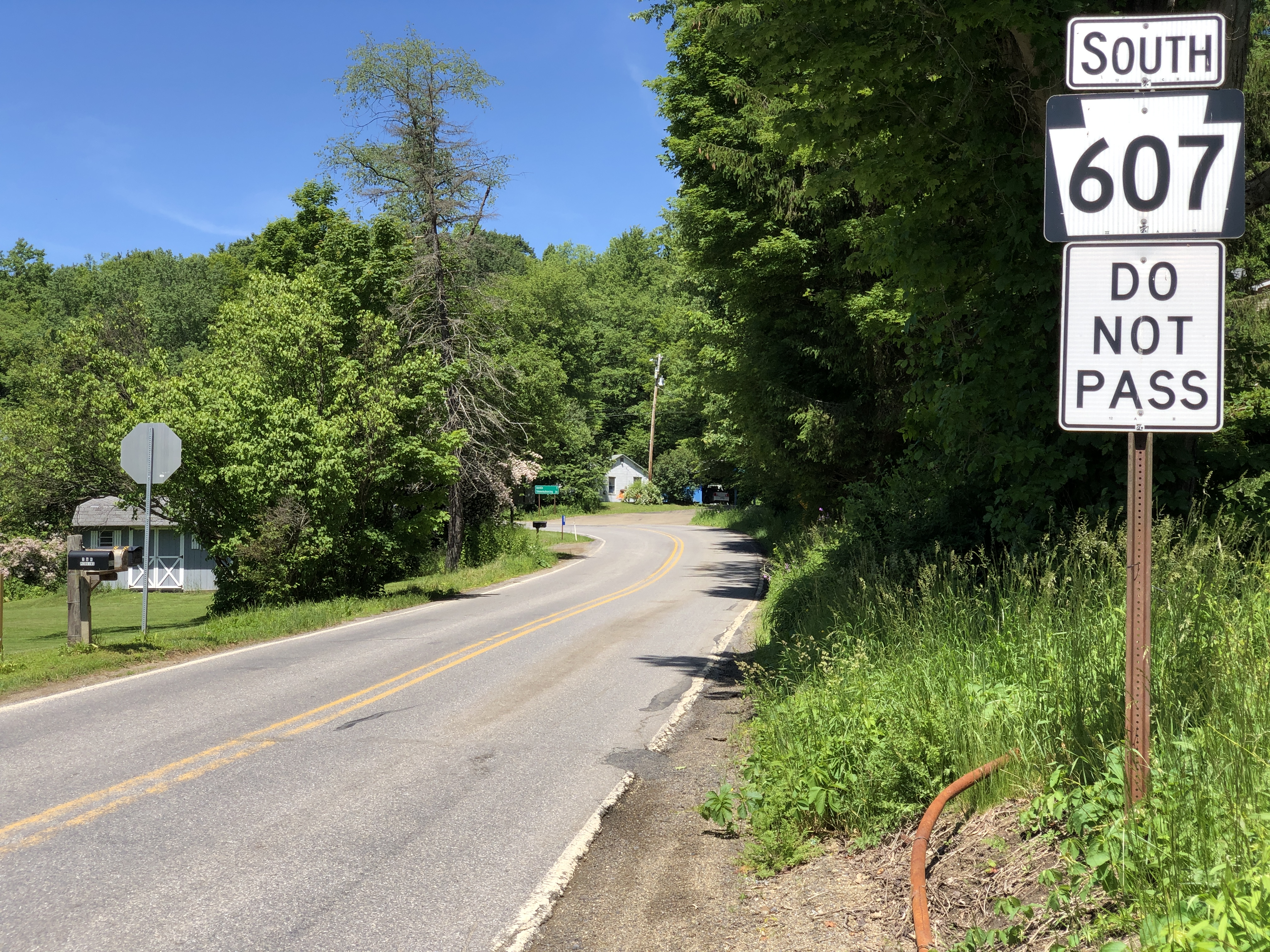
PA 607 southbound at PA 155 in Keating Township

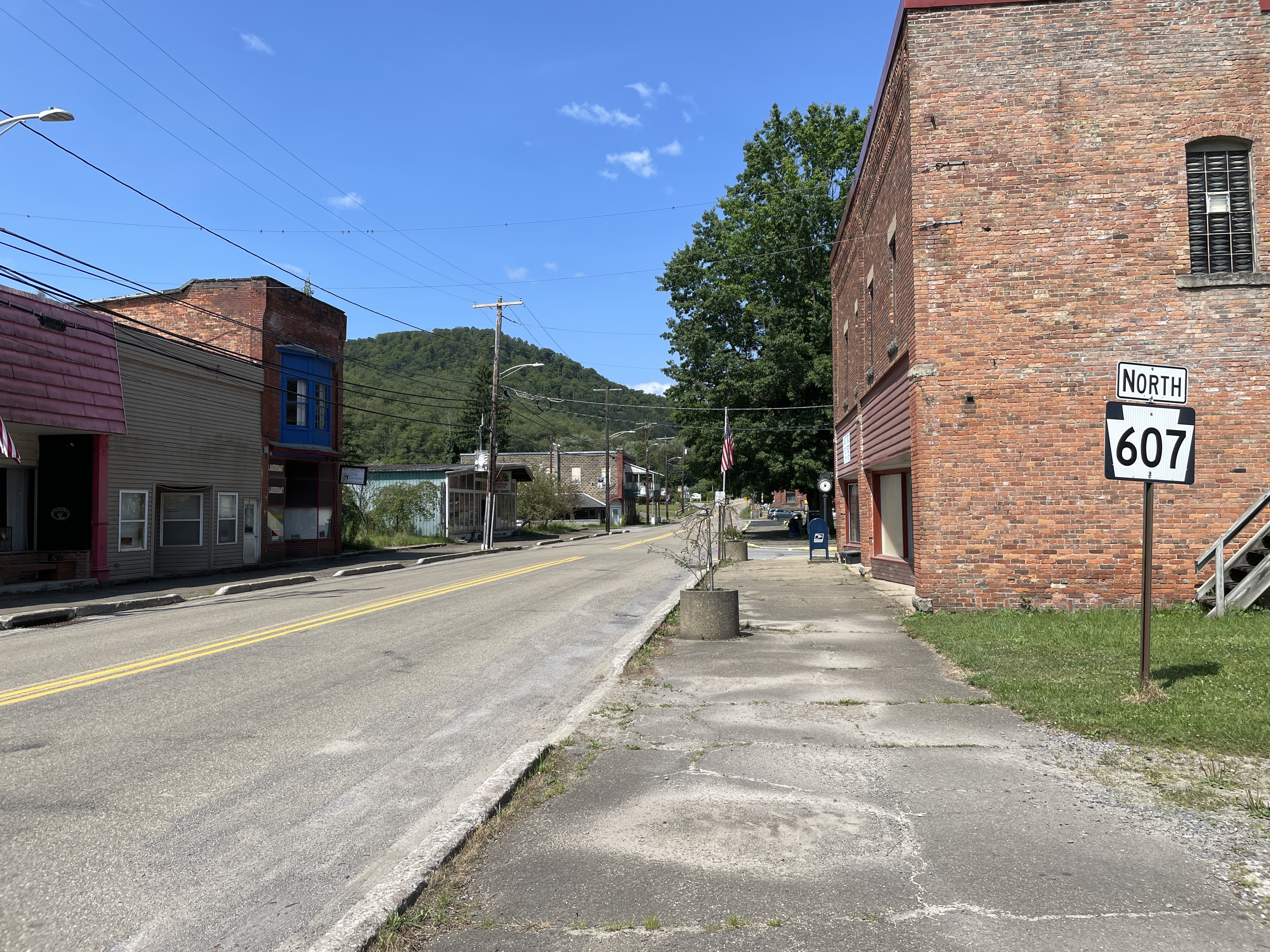
PA 607 northbound past PA 872 in Austin

PA 607 begins at an intersection with PA 872 in the borough of Austin in Potter County, heading west on two-lane undivided Main Street. The road passes a mix of homes and businesses before it turns to the northwest and runs between wooded areas to the north and residential areas to the south. The route heads into forested areas of hills and leaves Austin for Portage Township, where it becomes an unnamed road. PA 607 enters Keating Township and continues northwest through rural land, passing through tracts of Susquehannock State Forest. Farther northwest, the road makes a curve to the west before a sharp turn to the south. PA 607 reaches its northern terminus at an intersection with PA 155 in the community of Keating Summit.

== Major intersections ==
The entire route is in Potter County.

Location	mi	km	Destinations	Notes
Austin	0.00	0.00	PA 872 (Rugaber Street / Costello Avenue) – Coudersport, Sinnemahoning	Southern terminus
Keating Township	6.76	10.88	PA 155 (Keating Summit Road) – Port Allegany, Emporium	Northern terminus
1.000 mi = 1.609 km; 1.000 km = 0.621 mi
