= Pennsylvania Route 872 =

State highway in Pennsylvania, US

Pennsylvania Route 872

Route information
- Maintained by PennDOT
- Length: 39.794 mi (64.042 km)

Major junctions
- South end: PA 120 in Grove Township
- PA 607 in Austin
- North end: US 6 / PA 44 in Coudersport

Location
- Country: United States
- State: Pennsylvania
- Counties: Cameron, Potter

Highway system
- Pennsylvania State Route System; Interstate; US; State; Scenic; Legislative
← PA 871	→ PA 873
← PA 958	→ PA 960

Pennsylvania Route 872 (PA 872) is a 39.8-mile-long (64.1 km) state highway located in Cameron and Potter counties in Pennsylvania. The southern terminus is at PA 120 in Grove Township. The northern terminus is at U.S. Route 6 (US 6)/PA 44 in Coudersport.

== Route description ==
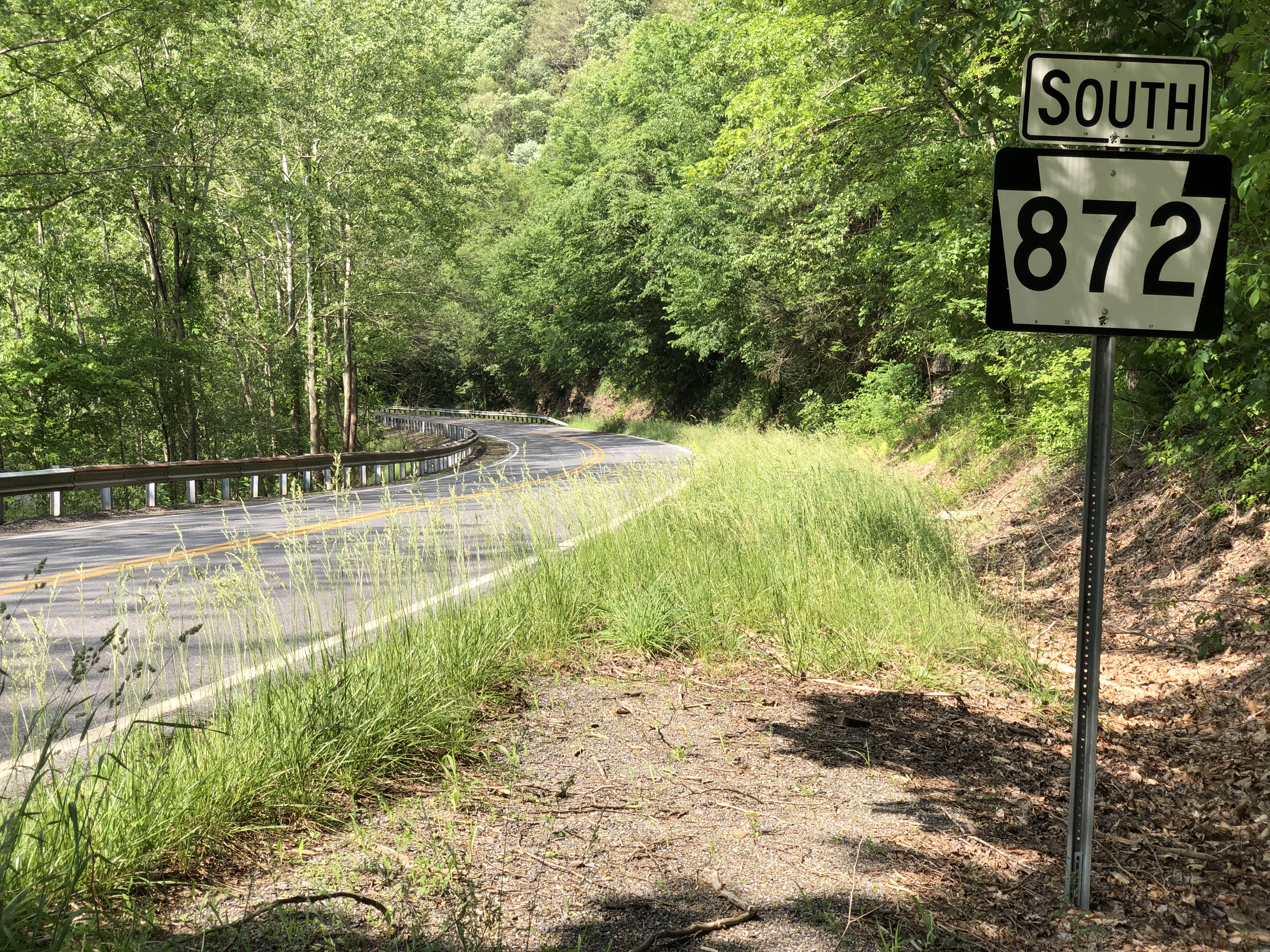
PA 872 southbound in Grove Township

PA 872 begins at an intersection with PA 120 in Grove Township, Cameron County, heading north-northeast on two-lane undivided First Fork Road. The road heads through forested areas, running along the west bank of the First Fork Sinnemahoning Creek. The route runs between tracts of the Elk State Forest, curving to the northeast. PA 872 winds to the north and passes along the western edge of Sinnemahoning State Park, passing near the George B. Stevenson Reservoir. The road continues north-northwest past the state park through forested areas with sparse homes, passing through Lushbaugh and First Fork before turning to the north-northeast.

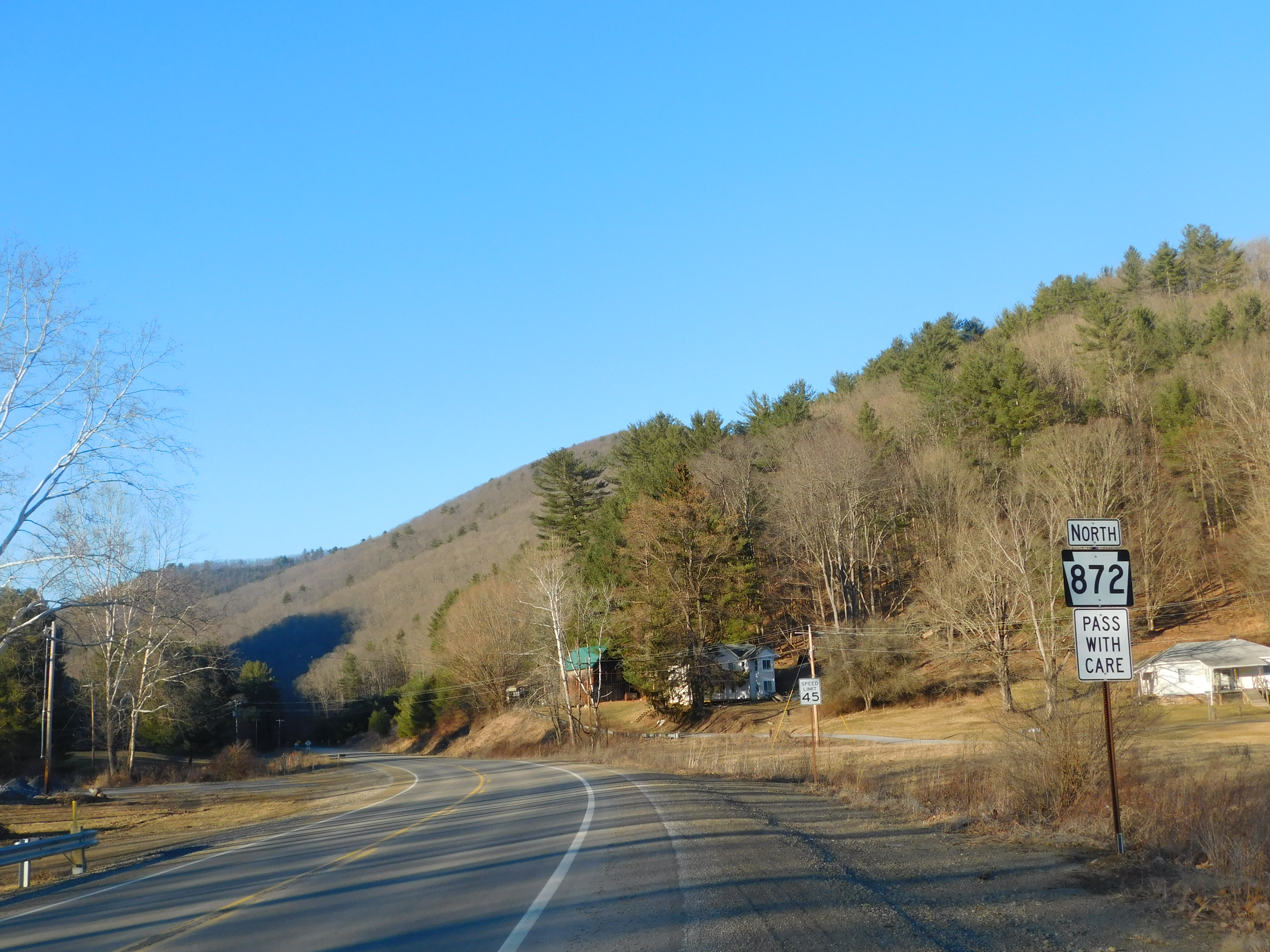
PA 872 northbound in Wharton

PA 872 enters Wharton Township in Potter County and becomes an unnamed road, continuing through forested areas to the west of Sinnemahoning State Park and passing through Berge Run. The road runs between tracts of the Susquehannock State Forest and leaves the state park as it winds to the northeast, crossing the First Fork Sinnemahoning Creek and passing through Wharton. The route continues north-northwest through more forests with some fields, running to the east of the creek and heading into Sylvania Township. Here, PA 872 comes to the community of Costello and turns west onto Costello Road, crossing the First Fork Sinnemahoning Creek into Portage Township. The road turns northwest into more rural areas and continues into the borough of Austin, where it becomes Costello Avenue and passes a few homes. The route turns to the north and comes to an intersection with the southern terminus of PA 607, becoming Rugaber Street and running through more residential areas.

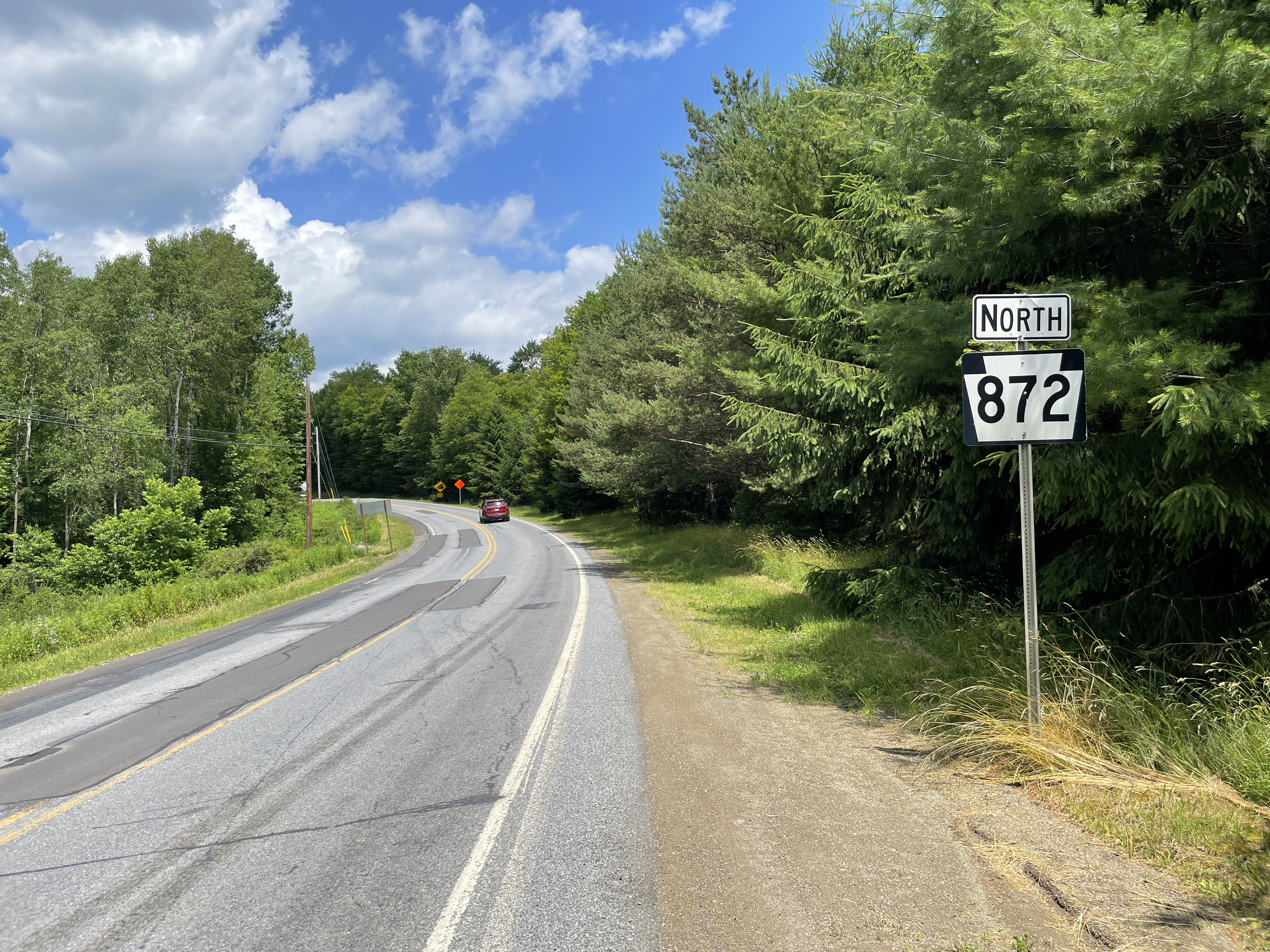
PA 872 northbound in Eulalia Township

PA 872 heads into forests and enters Keating Township, becoming an unnamed road and passing to the east of Austin Dam Memorial Park, which is located at the site of the Austin Dam failure. The road heads through more forested areas with a few fields and homes, turning to the east and crossing into Homer Township. Here, the route becomes Dividing Ridge Road and turns northeast through more rural areas. PA 872 heads into more agricultural areas with some residences and woods, continuing into Eulalia Township. Here, the road becomes unnamed, turning north in the community of Jenkins Hill and running through wooded areas with a few fields and homes. PA 872 heads into the borough of Coudersport and becomes Buffalo Street, passing a few homes and businesses before ending at US 6/PA 44. Past this intersection, the road continues as North Hollow Road, which is an unsigned quadrant route designated State Route 4013.

== Major intersections ==
County	Location	mi	km	Destinations	Notes
Cameron	Grove Township	0.000	0.000	PA 120 (Main Street) – Renovo, Emporium	Southern terminus
Potter	Austin	26.695	42.961	PA 607 north (Main Street) – Keating Summit	Southern terminus of PA 607
Potter	Coudersport	39.794	64.042	US 6 / PA 44 (East Second Street) – Coudersport, Wellsboro, Jersey Shore	Northern terminus
1.000 mi = 1.609 km; 1.000 km = 0.621 mi
