= Port Allegany School District =

Public school district in Pennsylvania, United States

Coordinates: 41.81647°N 78.27145°W

Port Allegheny School District
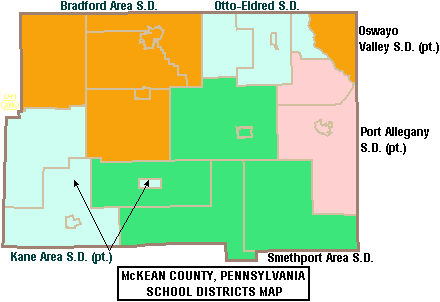

Location
- 20 Oak Street Port Allegany, McKean County and Potter County, Pennsylvania, 16743-1297; United States

District information
- Type: public school district

Students and staff
- District mascot: Gators

Other information
- Website: www.pasdedu.org

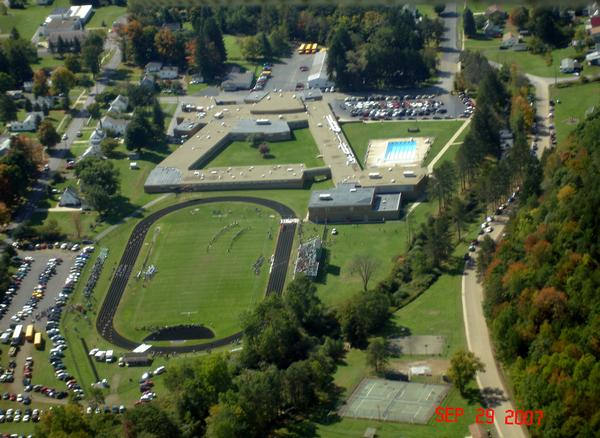

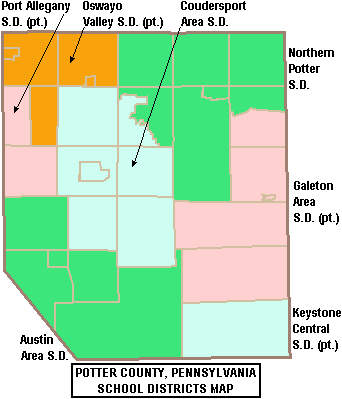
Port Allegany School District region in Potter County

Port Allegany School District is a small, rural, public school district located in McKean County and Potter County, Pennsylvania, United States. Geographically, the district is in the north-central-west part of the state. The district encompasses an area of about 169 square miles (440 km^{2}). It includes Annin and Liberty Townships and Port Allegany in McKean County and Roulette and Pleasant Valley Townships in Potter County. According to 2000 federal census data, it serves a resident population of 6,344. In 2010, the district's population had decreased to 5,737 people. The offices for the school system are in Port Allegany High School, which is in the borough of Port Allegany.

Port Allegany School District operates two schools: Port Allegany Junior Senior High School and Port Allegany Elementary School. The district is part of the Seneca Highlands Intermediate Unit 9 which provides services for special education students, curriculum development and teacher training.

== School activities ==
Port Allegany School District offers a variety of clubs, activities and an extensive sports program.

=== Clubs ===
Computer club, drama club, French club, peer helpers, SADD, Spanish club, academic team and student council.

=== Music ===
- Chorus
- Show choir
- Chamber singers
- Drama
- Band
- Marching band

=== Sports ===
The District funds:

Boys

- Baseball - A
- Basketball- A
- Cross country - A
- Football - A
- Golf - AA
- Soccer - A
- Track and field - AA
- Wrestling - AA

Girls

- Basketball - A
- Cross country - A
- Golf - AA
- Soccer (fall) - A
- Softball - A
- Track and field - AA
- Volleyball

Junior High School Sports

Boys

- Basketball
- Cross country
- Football
- Track and field
- Wrestling

Girls

- Basketball
- Cross country
- Track and field
- Volleyball

According to PIAA directory July 2012
