= Pennsylvania Route 446 =

State highway in McKean County, Pennsylvania, US

Pennsylvania Route 446

Route information
- Maintained by PennDOT
- Length: 13.091 mi (21.068 km)
- Existed: 1928–present

Major junctions
- South end: PA 46 in Keating Township
- PA 155 in Eldred Township; PA 346 in Eldred
- North end: NY 305 at the New York state line near Portville, New York

Location
- Country: United States
- State: Pennsylvania
- Counties: McKean

Highway system
- Pennsylvania State Route System; Interstate; US; State; Scenic; Legislative
← PA 445	→ PA 447

Pennsylvania Route 446 (PA 446) is an 13-mile-long (21 km) state highway located in McKean County, Pennsylvania. The southern terminus is at Route 46 in the Keating Township neighborhood of Farmers Valley. The northern terminus is at the New York state line near Portville, New York. Route 446 is mountainous for most of its length and its only street designation is Main Street. PA 446 is part of a family of routes interconnected with PA 46. However, unlike several others, PA 446 does connect to its parent route and PA 346.

PA 446 was assigned in 1928 and used to be part of U.S. Route 6 (US 6) and PA 7.

== Route description ==
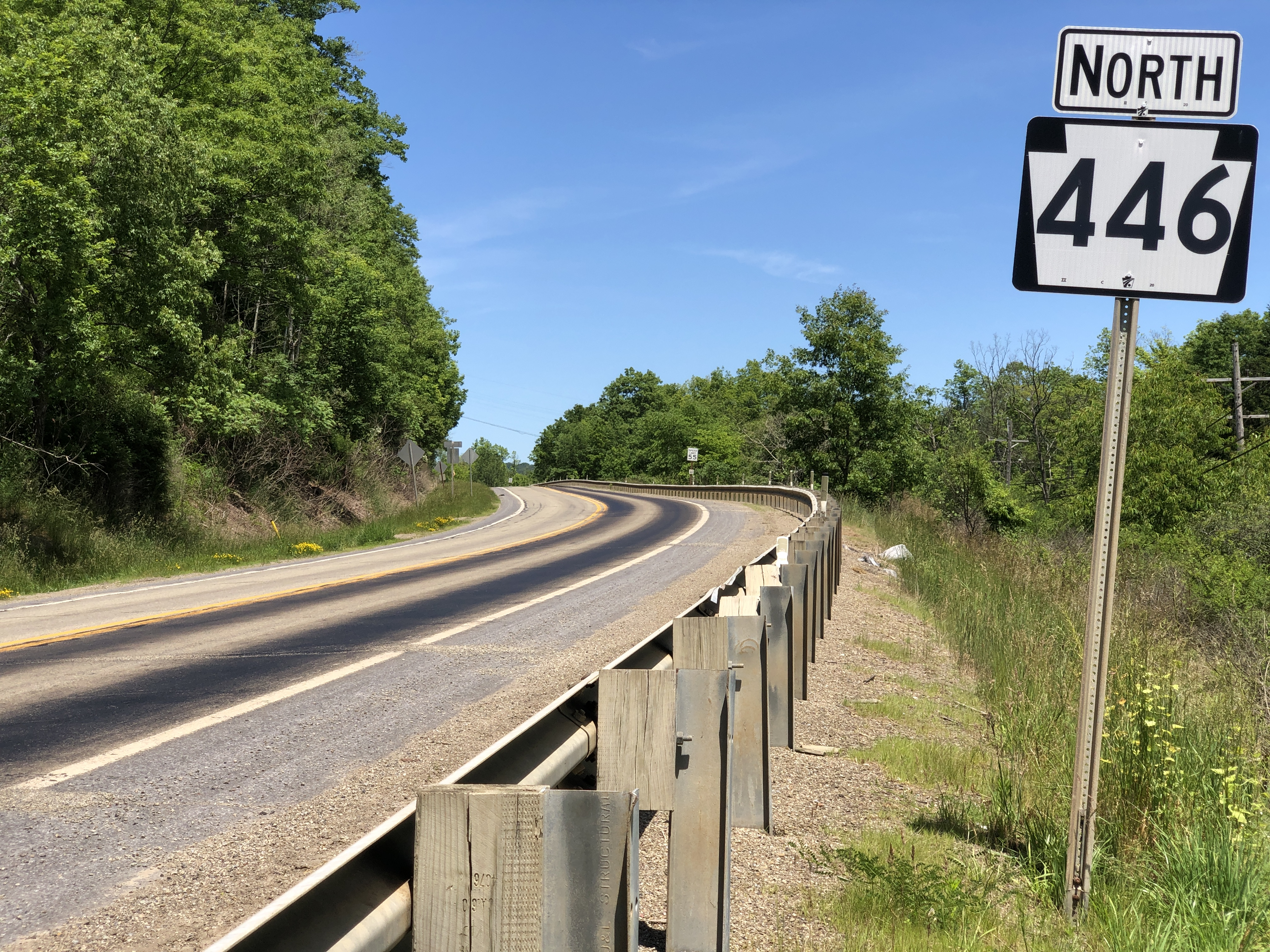
PA 446 northbound in Eldred Township

PA 446 begins at a fork with its parent route, PA 46 in the Farmers Valley community of Keating Township. Here, the highway is almost 2,000 feet (610 m) above sea level. At the base of a mountain, PA 446 passes through Farmers Valley and passes to the north of a landmark called Diegel Hollow, running parallel to a Western New York and Pennsylvania Railroad line. The highway curves around the base of a mountain north of Prospect Hill. The highway passes Moody Hollow, where it turns northward and crosses the railroad tracks. PA 446 enters Larabee, where it passes over the Allegheny River and the Buffalo Line railroad line, which is owned by Norfolk Southern and operated by the Western New York and Pennsylvania Railroad, before it intersects with the northern terminus of PA 155.

PA 446 leaves Larabee soon afterward, becoming surrounding on both sides by mountains, with the river and railroad tracks to the west. Although across a range of peaks, PA 346 parallels to the west. As the highway edges towards the state line, it enters the borough of Eldred. Just north of the borough, PA 346, which was paralleling earlier, now terminates at PA 446. The highway curves around a mountain and begins to follow the Allegheny River and the Buffalo Line railroad tracks before crossing the railroad tracks at-grade immediately before the New York line. There it continues as NY 305.

== History ==
PA 446 from Farmers Valley to Larabee used to be part of Pennsylvania Route 7, which was designated in 1925. The next year, PA 7 was assigned as U.S. Route 6 as well. PA 446 was assigned in 1928 from Larabee to the New York border. In 1930, PA 446 was extended to Farmers Valley to its current southern terminus at PA 46.

== Major intersections ==
The entire route is in McKean County.

Location	mi	km	Destinations	Notes
Keating Township	0.000	0.000	PA 46 – Smethport, Bradford	Southern terminus
Eldred Township	5.073	8.164	PA 155 south – Port Allegany	Northern terminus of Route 155
Eldred	9.460	15.224	PA 346 west – Bradford	Eastern terminus of Route 346
Eldred Township	13.091	21.068	NY 305 north – Olean	New York state line; northern terminus
1.000 mi = 1.609 km; 1.000 km = 0.621 mi
