= Lynn Hall =

Building in Port Allegany, Pennsylvania

- U.S. National Register of Historic Places
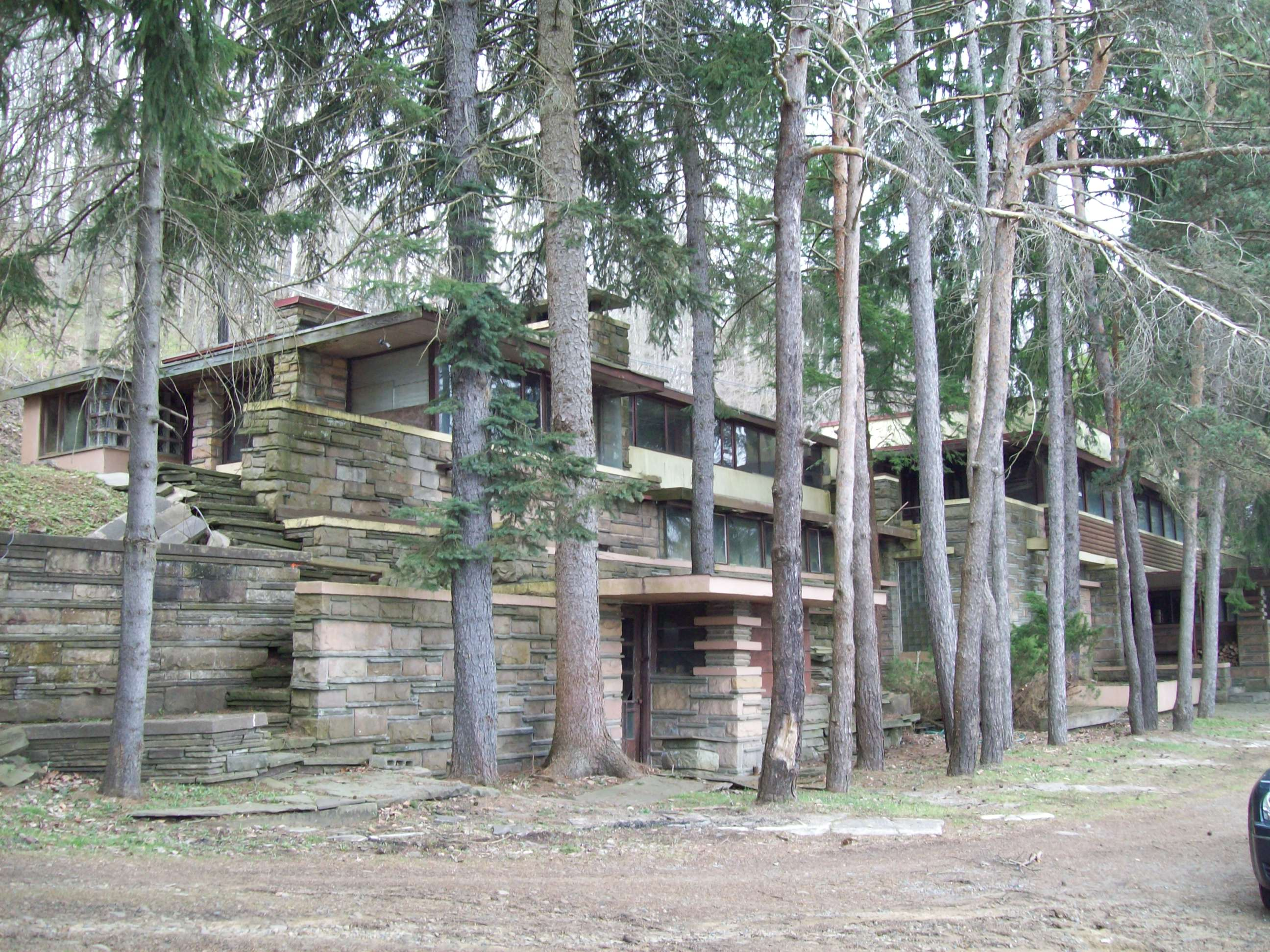
- Lynn Hall, April 2010

- Location within Pennsylvania Location within the United States
- Location: W side of US 6, 1.5 mi. W of Port Allegany, Liberty Township
- Coordinates: 41°49′36″N 78°18′26″W
- Built: 1935
- Architect: Walter J. Hall, Raymond Viner Hall
- Architectural style: Modern Movement, Wrightian
- NRHP reference No.: 07000033
- Added to NRHP: February 7, 2007

Lynn Hall was originally designed as a restaurant, dance hall and family residence located in Port Allegany, Pennsylvania, United States. It is a sprawling Modernist Movement style structure designed and built by Walter J. Hall — a self-taught practitioner of the style. The first phase was completed in 1935. Lynn Hall slightly resembles the design for Fallingwater (designed by Frank Lloyd Wright) because in 1936 Walter was asked to join the Fallingwater project as general manager and chief stone mason.

Lynn Hall also served as the offices for Walter’s son, Raymond Viner Hall. Raymond developed his own style of organic architecture first opening his practice in the building in 1939. In 1952, upon Walter’s death, he closed the restaurant and adapted the entire building into a studio where he apprenticed dozens of aspiring architects in the modernist style. Raymond’s work can be found locally and regionally and is commonly referred to as Allegheny Modernism.

It was listed on the National Register of Historic Places (NRHP) in February 2007. Today, Lynn Hall is being rehabilitated to its former glory and offers short term rental accommodations that provide authentically restored mid-century modern suites appointed with period furnishings, art and modern luxuries.

== See also ==
- National Register of Historic Places listings in McKean County, Pennsylvania
