= Farmers Valley, Pennsylvania =

Unincorporated community in Pennsylvania, U.S.

Coordinates: 41.85933°N 78.44238°W

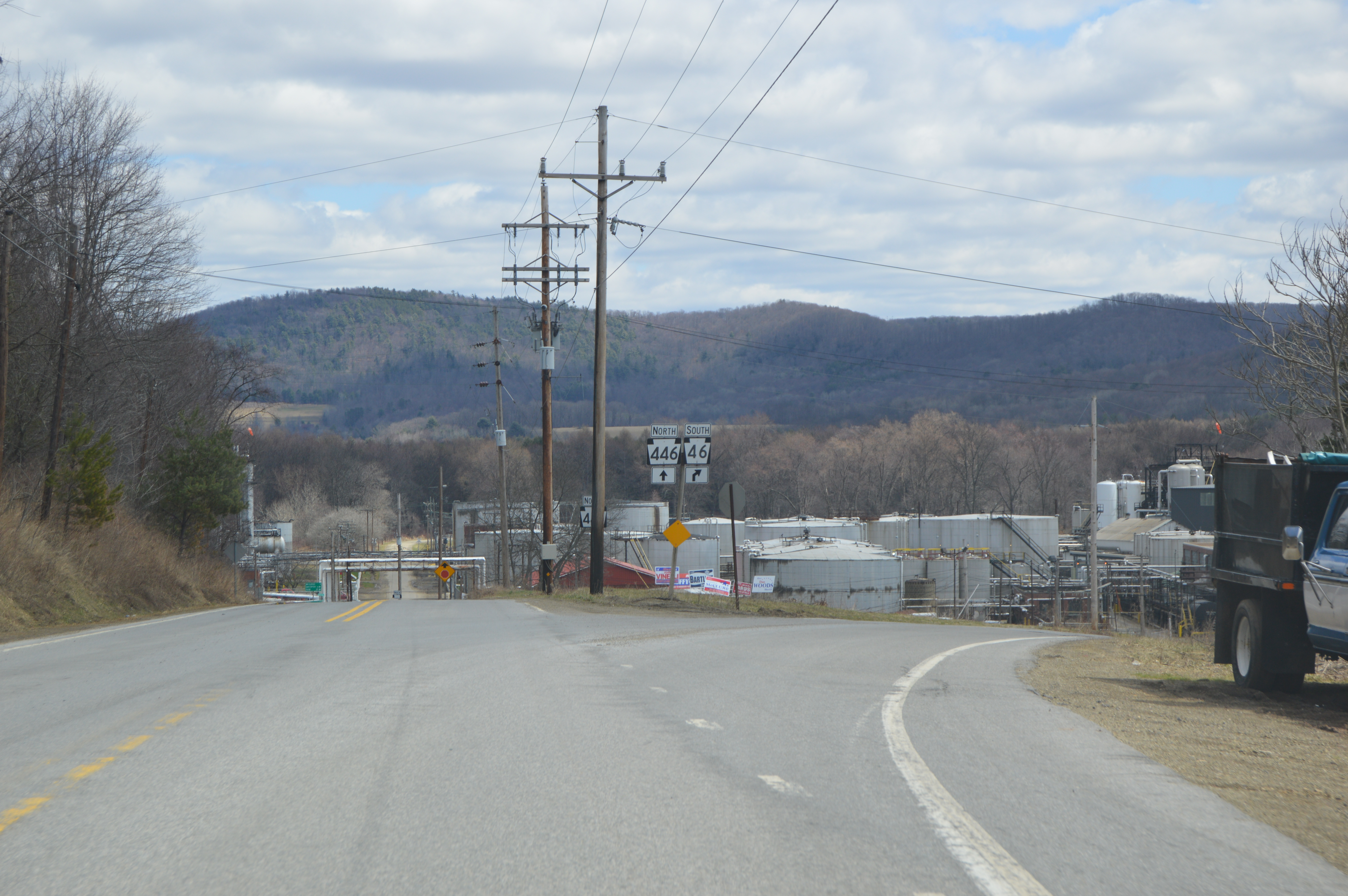
Junction of Pennsylvania Routes 46 and 446

Farmers Valley is an unincorporated community in Keating Township, McKean County, Pennsylvania, United States, situated between Coryville and Smethport.
