= Port Allegany, Pennsylvania =

Borough in Pennsylvania, US

- Borough
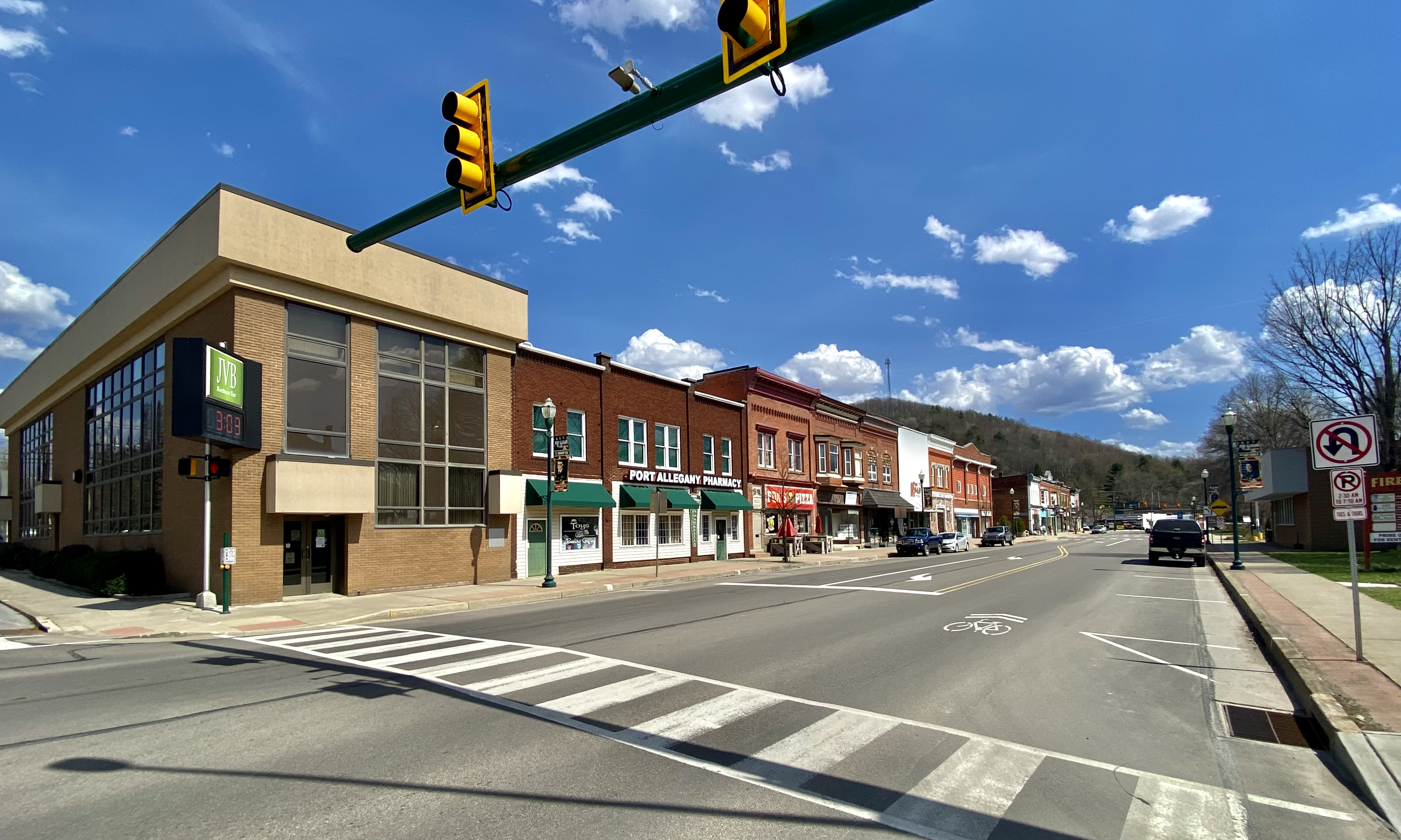
- North Main Street in April 2022

- Location in McKean County, Pennsylvania

- Location within Pennsylvania Location within the United States
- Coordinates: 41°48′54″N 78°16′45″W
- Country: United States
- State: Pennsylvania
- County: McKean
- Settled: 1815
- Incorporated: 1882

Government
  - Type: Borough Council
  - Mayor: George Riley

Area
  - Total: 1.78 sq mi (4.61 km^{2})
  - Land: 1.77 sq mi (4.59 km^{2})
  - Water: 0.0077 sq mi (0.02 km^{2})

Population (2020)
  - Total: 2,135
  - Density: 1,203.9/sq mi (464.83/km^{2})
- Time zone: UTC-5 (Eastern (EST))
  - Summer (DST): UTC-4 (EDT)
- ZIP code: 16743
- Area code: 814
- FIPS code: 42-62088
- Website: portalleganypa.org

Port Allegany is a borough in McKean County, Pennsylvania, United States. The population was 2,135 at the 2020 census.

The town lies in the foothills of the Appalachian Mountains, 20 miles (32 km) west of the Allegheny River's headwaters.

== History ==
Originally known as Canoe Place, after-which, Kingsville, the town's name was then changed to Port Allegany in 1838. It is unusual among places in Pennsylvania that make reference to the Allegheny River; it used the spelling Allegany, more commonly encountered in place names in neighboring New York.

The town developed as a port on the Allegheny River, and provided a place where travelers coming overland from the Susquehanna River could continue by boat.

== Economy ==
In the 1800s natural gas was discovered in the area, which led to the expansion of industries including glass firms, chemical plants, cheese factories, machine shops, brick plants, sawmills, planing mills and tanneries. The area also produces crude oil, and it is not unusual to see small gas or oil wells and storage tanks in fields, forests or back yards in the region. The introduction of hydraulic fracturing produced an increase in local production of gas and oil, and a boost to the local economy, in the 2000s and 2010s.

Port Allegany has long been associated with glass manufacturing. Saint-Gobain, a glass container producer, is located there, in a facility that has been owned at different stages by Pierce Glass and Ball-Incon. A concrete tower that is part of the manufacturing plant is the tallest structure in Port Allegany and is visible from most of the small downtown area. From 1937 to 2016, Port Allegany was also home to a factory of the Pittsburgh Corning Corporation. The "PC", as the factory was known locally, was the only producer of architectural glass building blocks in the United States, and also produced Foamglas insulation.

In the middle of the 20th century, the town was home to a factory that manufactured Kewpie dolls.

== Geography ==
Port Allegany is located in eastern McKean County on the east side of the Allegheny River. U.S. Route 6 passes through the borough, leading west 10 miles (16 km) to Smethport, the county seat, and east 16 miles (26 km) to Coudersport. Pennsylvania Route 155 joins US 6 through the center of town but leads northwest down the Allegheny River valley 12 miles (19 km) to Eldred and south 24 miles (39 km) to Emporium, passing over the Eastern Continental Divide at Keating Summit along the way.

According to the U.S. Census Bureau, the borough of Port Allegany has a total area of 1.78 square miles (4.61 km^{2}), of which 0.007 square miles (0.018 km^{2}), or 0.39%, are water.

Port Allegany and McKean County are located in the region of Northern Pennsylvania (and sometimes part of the Northern Tier region). This part of the state is rural and heavily forested. Before the arrival of the first European settlers, the area was densely forested with eastern hemlock. Many of these sometimes massive trees were cut for lumber or sometimes only for their bark, which was used in the tanning industry. Many older homes, barns and other buildings in the region were at least partly built with hemlock lumber. The contemporary forests in the region produce high quality black cherry lumber, valued in the furniture and cabinetry industries. While there are currently no working furniture factories in the region, the trade in black cherry continues.

=== Climate ===
Climate data for Port Allegany, Pennsylvania (1991–2020)
Month	Jan	Feb	Mar	Apr	May	Jun	Jul	Aug	Sep	Oct	Nov	Dec	Year
Mean daily maximum °F (°C)	31.0 (−0.6)	33.8 (1.0)	43.1 (6.2)	56.6 (13.7)	68.0 (20.0)	75.6 (24.2)	79.5 (26.4)	77.9 (25.5)	71.4 (21.9)	59.2 (15.1)	46.8 (8.2)	35.8 (2.1)	56.6 (13.6)
Daily mean °F (°C)	22.3 (−5.4)	24.2 (−4.3)	32.7 (0.4)	44.0 (6.7)	55.2 (12.9)	63.7 (17.6)	67.5 (19.7)	66.2 (19.0)	59.7 (15.4)	48.1 (8.9)	37.6 (3.1)	28.2 (−2.1)	45.8 (7.7)
Mean daily minimum °F (°C)	13.6 (−10.2)	14.5 (−9.7)	22.3 (−5.4)	31.3 (−0.4)	42.5 (5.8)	51.7 (10.9)	55.5 (13.1)	54.5 (12.5)	48.0 (8.9)	36.9 (2.7)	28.4 (−2.0)	20.6 (−6.3)	35.0 (1.7)
Average precipitation inches (mm)	3.05 (77)	2.25 (57)	2.98 (76)	3.53 (90)	3.83 (97)	4.24 (108)	4.53 (115)	4.10 (104)	3.69 (94)	3.88 (99)	3.27 (83)	3.24 (82)	42.59 (1,082)
Average snowfall inches (cm)	14.1 (36)	12.1 (31)	9.4 (24)	1.7 (4.3)	0.0 (0.0)	0.0 (0.0)	0.0 (0.0)	0.0 (0.0)	0.0 (0.0)	0.6 (1.5)	3.9 (9.9)	13.3 (34)	55.1 (140.7)
Source: NOAA

== Demographics ==
Historical population
Census	Pop.	Note	%±
1880	731		—
1890	1,230		68.3%
1900	1,853		50.7%
1910	1,972		6.4%
1920	2,356		19.5%
1930	2,193		−6.9%
1940	2,356		7.4%
1950	2,519		6.9%
1960	2,742		8.9%
1970	2,703		−1.4%
1980	2,593		−4.1%
1990	2,391		−7.8%
2000	2,355		−1.5%
2010	2,157		−8.4%
2020	2,135		−1.0%
2021 (est.)	2,090	▼	−2.1%

As of the census of 2000, there were 2,355 people, 924 households, and 623 families residing in the borough. The population density was 1,286.0 inhabitants per square mile (496.5/km^{2}). There were 992 housing units at an average density of 541.7 per square mile (209.2/km^{2}). The racial makeup of the borough was 99.36% White, 0.08% Native American, 0.08% Asian, 0.21% from other races, and 0.25% from two or more races. Hispanic or Latino of any race were 0.25% of the population.

There were 924 households, out of which 35.3% had children under the age of 18 living with them, 51.0% were married couples living together, 11.7% had a female householder with no husband present, and 32.5% were non-families. 27.6% of all households were made up of individuals, and 13.1% had someone living alone who was 65 years of age or older. The average household size was 2.54 and the average family size was 3.10.

In the borough the population was spread out, with 30.7% under the age of 18, 6.7% from 18 to 24, 27.3% from 25 to 44, 19.3% from 45 to 64, and 15.9% who were 65 years of age or older. The median age was 35 years. For every 100 females there were 92.2 males. For every 100 females age 18 and over, there were 85.1 males.

The median income for a household in the borough was $34,896, and the median income for a family was $43,125. Males had a median income of $32,792 versus $21,434 for females. The per capita income for the borough was $16,601. About 13.2% of families and 16.5% of the population were below the poverty line, including 27.0% of those under age 18 and 8.9% of those age 65 or over.

== Education ==
The school district is the Port Allegany School District.

Schools include:

- Port Allegany Elementary School (K-6) is located on Clyde Lynch Drive, and first received students in August 1981. The school replaced the aging Arnold School (1924) and Liberty School (1938). On January 20, 1981, a time capsule was placed at the new school's construction site by the 4th grade class president (class of 1988), to be opened in 100 years.
- Port Allegany High School (7-12) is located at 20 Oak Street. Architecturally, it shows similarities to Frank Lloyd Wright's Fallingwater and to the nearby Lynn Hall. Port Allegany High School was designed by architect Raymond Viner Hall. His father, Walter Hall designed and built Lynn Hall. Walter Hall and his workers built Fallingwater, borrowing his ideas from Lynn Hall, along with Frank Lloyd Wright's ideas. Lynn Hall predates Fallingwater. The school mascot is the Gator.

Additionally, Seneca Highlands Intermediate Unit Nine School provides services for students with special education needs, as well as curriculum development and teacher training.

== People of note ==
- Major League Baseball player Josh Kinney grew up in Port Allegany.
- Writer Grace Sartwell Mason was born and raised in Port Allegany.

== Filming of Unstoppable ==
Parts of the 2010 film Unstoppable were filmed in Port Allegany and many of the small communities nearby.

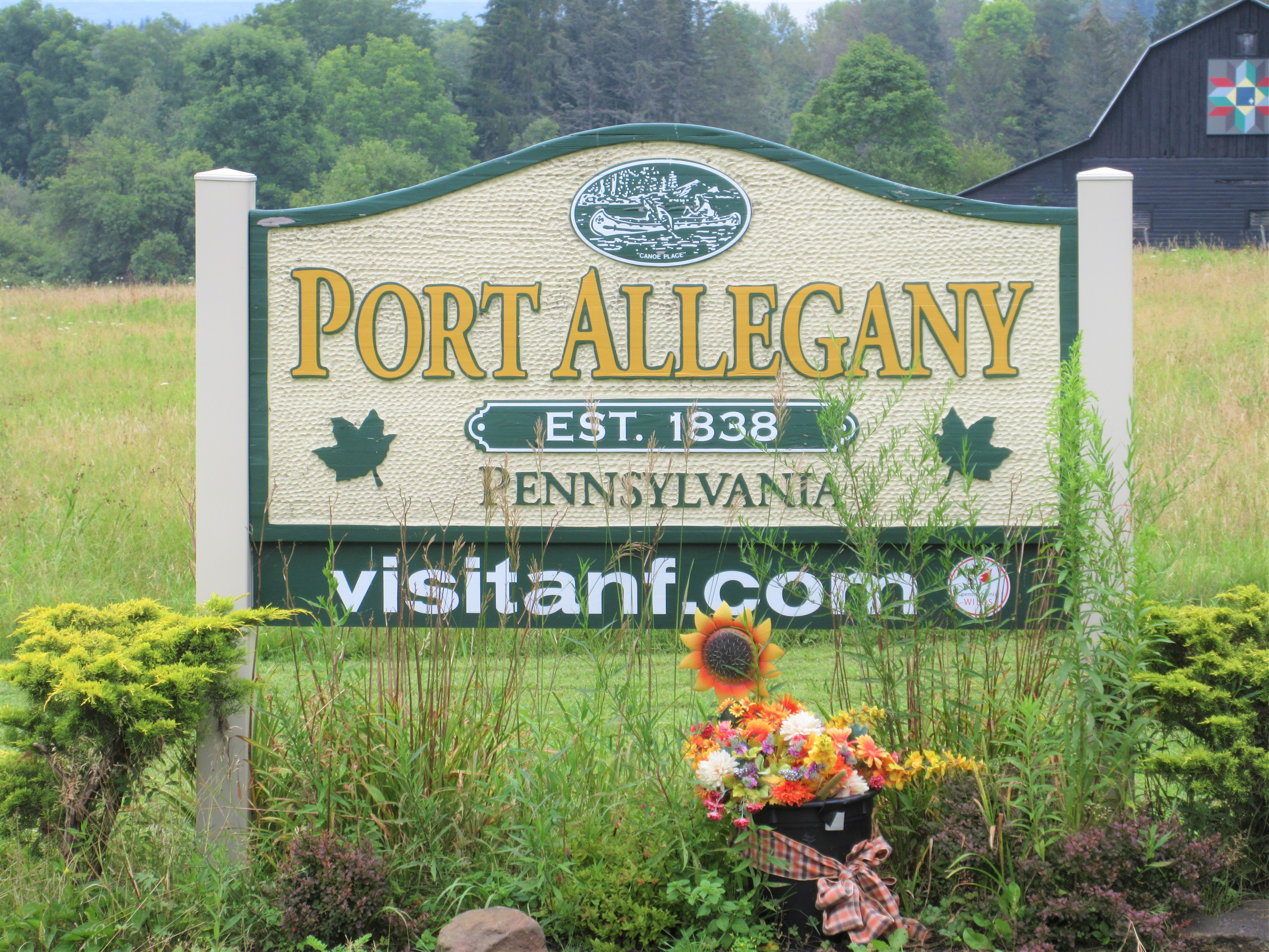
Welcome sign on Route 6

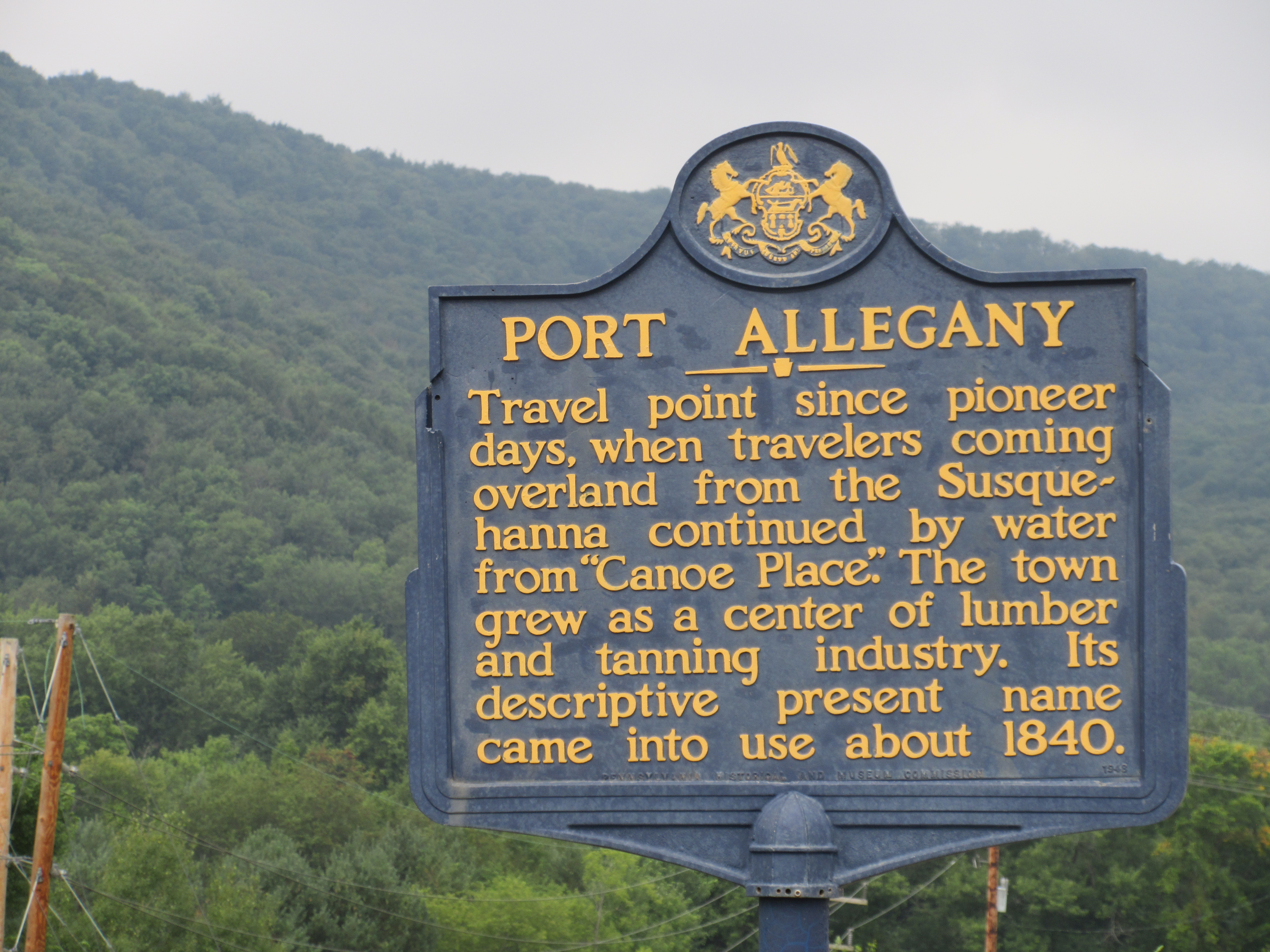
Historical sign

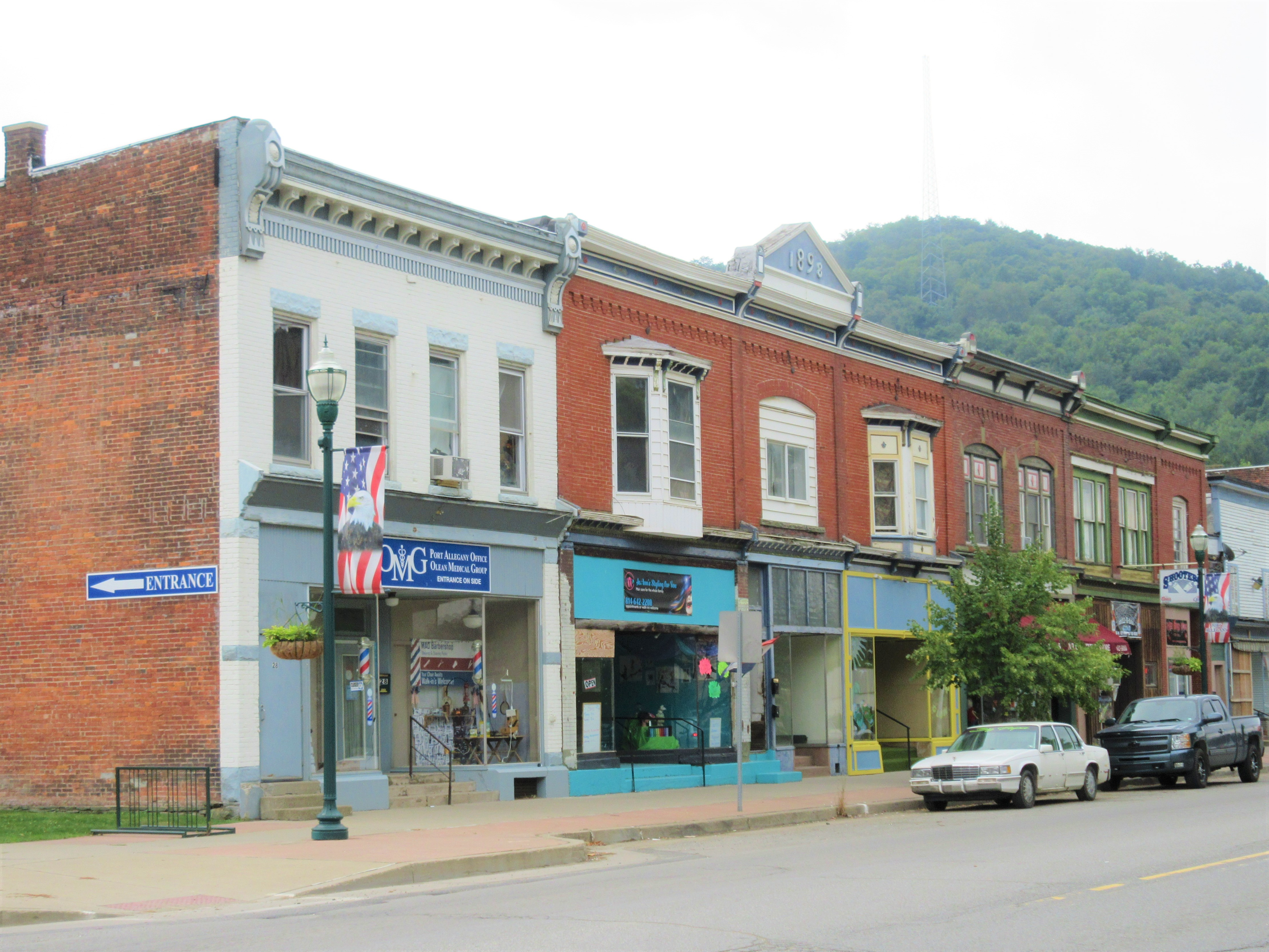
Main Street, looking east

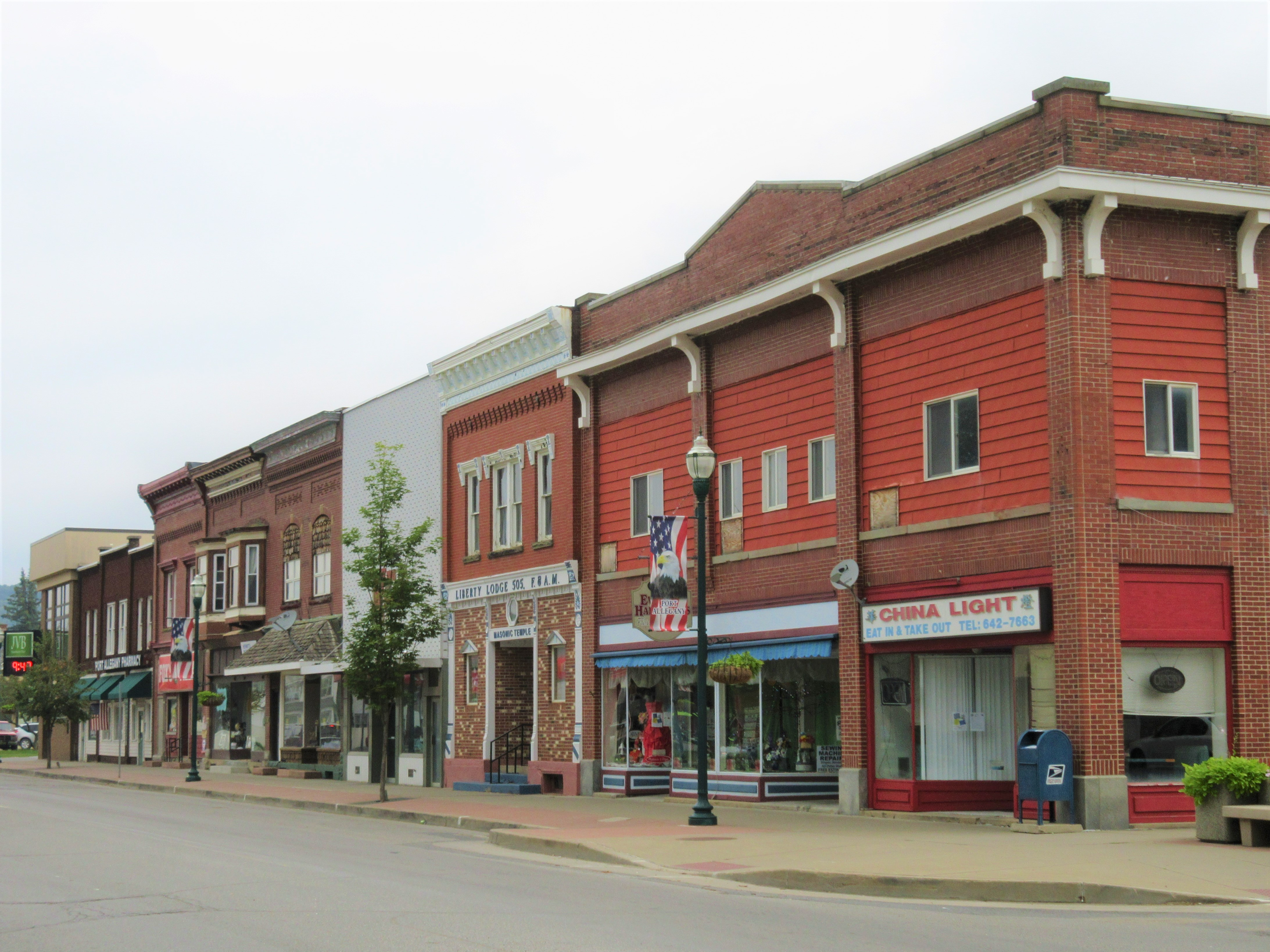
Main Street, looking west

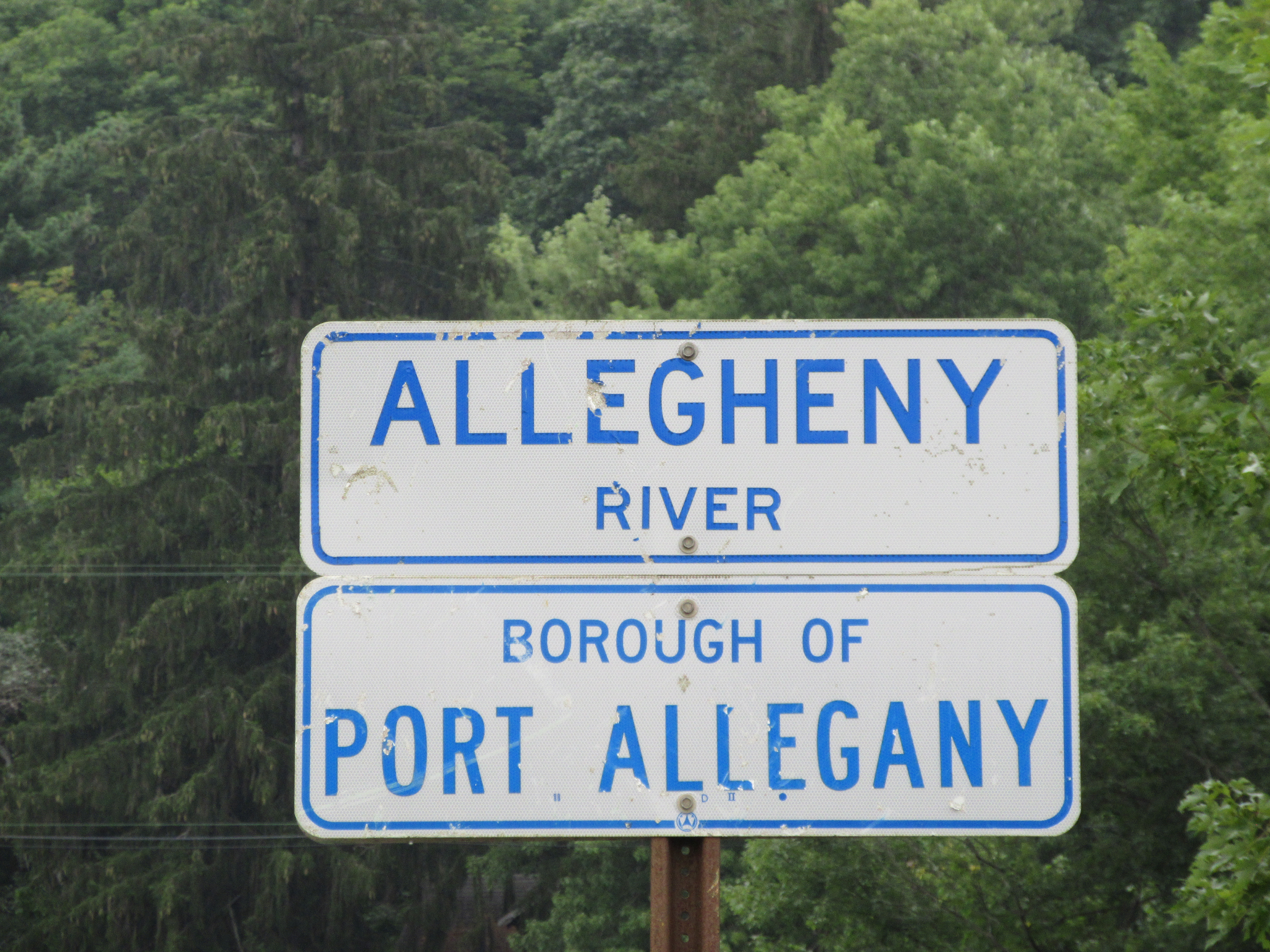
Signs at the bridge where Route 155 joins Route 6
