= Grace Sartwell Mason =

American journalist, critic and writer (1876–1966)

- Grace Sartwell
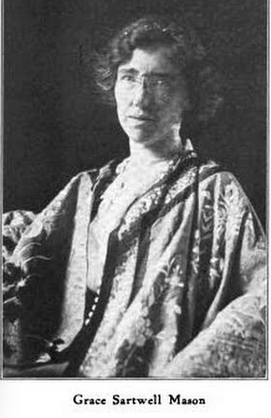
- Grace Sartwell Mason in 1915
- Born: October 31, 1876; Port Allegany, Pennsylvania, United States
- Died: February 1, 1966 (aged 89)
- Occupation: Journalist
- Spouse: Redfern Mason
- Writing career
- Language: English

Grace Sartwell Mason (October 31, 1876 – February 1, 1966) was an American journalist, critic, and writer of stories and novels.

== Early life ==
Grace Sartwell was born in Port Allegany, Pennsylvania, the daughter of Stephen C. and Rose F. Thompson Sartwell. Her parents kept an inn, Sartwell House. She had a twin brother, Stephen M. Sartwell. She studied music as a teen.

== Career ==
Mason published several novels and collections of short stories, including The Car and the Lady (1908, co-written with Percy F. Magargel), The Godparents (1910), Licky and his Gang (1912), The Bear's Claws (1913), The Golden Hope (1916), His Wife's Job (1919), The Shadow of Rosalie Byrnes (1919) and Women Are Queer (1932). She is sometimes considered an early woman author in science fiction, based on Bear's Claws (a "lost world" story).

Mason's stories appeared in national publications, including Harper's, Scribner's, Munsey's, American Magazine, Appleton's, and Everybody's.

She moved to Northern California in 1912. On her relocation to California, she stated: "For a writer who needs the out-of-doors and plenty of elbow room – big spaces, the mountains, the sound of the surf, the wind in the pines – California is the place." She was associated with the artists' colony at Carmel, California.

Mason was an officer of the Pen and Brush, a New York club for women writers and artists, while Ida Tarbell was the club's president. She was also a member of the Authors' Guild. She spent the summer of 1927 at an island retreat in Maine with three other women writers, including Pulitzer-prize winner Margaret Widdemer. In 1935 she was on the panel of judges for a literary contest sponsored by the Bronxville Women's Club.

Films based on works by Grace Sartwell Mason include Waifs (1918), The Shadow of Rosalie Byrne (1920), Speed (1925), Man Crazy (1927), and Honeymoon in Bali (1939). A 1926 story by Mason was also the basis of This Way to Heaven (September 18, 1956), an episode of the television anthology series The Jane Wyman Show.

== Personal life ==
Grace M. Sartwell married James Redfern Mason, a music critic, in 1902. They divorced. In 1930 she married architect Ralph Holt Howes. She died in 1966.
