= Cameron County Courthouse (Pennsylvania) =

Courthouse building in Pennsylvania, US

Coordinates: 41.5126°N 78.2368°W

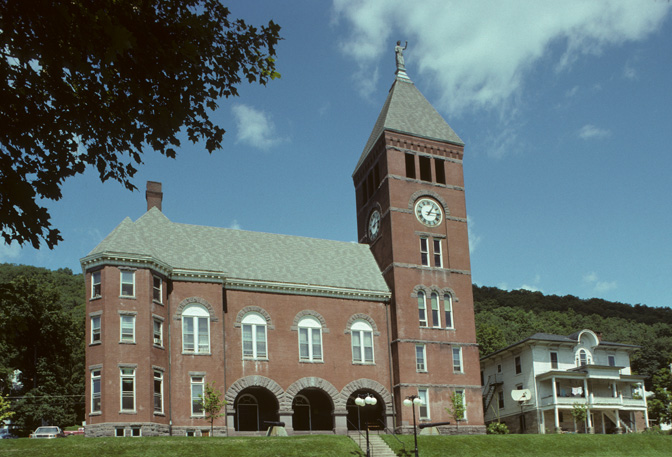
- Cameron County Courthouse in 1992
- Interactive map of the Cameron County Courthouse area

General information
- Location: 20 East 5th Street, Emporium, Pennsylvania, United States
- Construction started: 1890
- Completed: 1890
- Cost: $5,000 plus
- Client: Cameron County

Design and construction
- Engineer: Builder:

The Cameron County Courthouse is an historic courthouse building located at 20 East 5th Street in Emporium, Cameron County, Pennsylvania. It was built in 1890 in the Richardsonian Romanesque style of architecture and its entire cost was paid by public subscription, $5,000 of which was given by the Philadelphia and Erie Land Company. It is distinguished by its front clock tower topped by a statue of Lady Justice. It was photographed in 1992 by Calvin Beale for the United States Department of Agriculture. A current photograph shows a large addition extending out on the right side of the tower. Due to its low filing fees for divorces and the high number of uncontested divorce filings, it has been called the "divorce capitol" of Pennsylvania. Unlike many other courthouses of the same vintage which have been replaced or superseded by newer buildings, it is still in use today as a courthouse. The building was listed on the National Register of Historic Places in 2022.
