= Eldred Township, McKean County, Pennsylvania =

Township in Pennsylvania, United States

Coordinates: 41°58′00″N 78°21′59″W

- Township
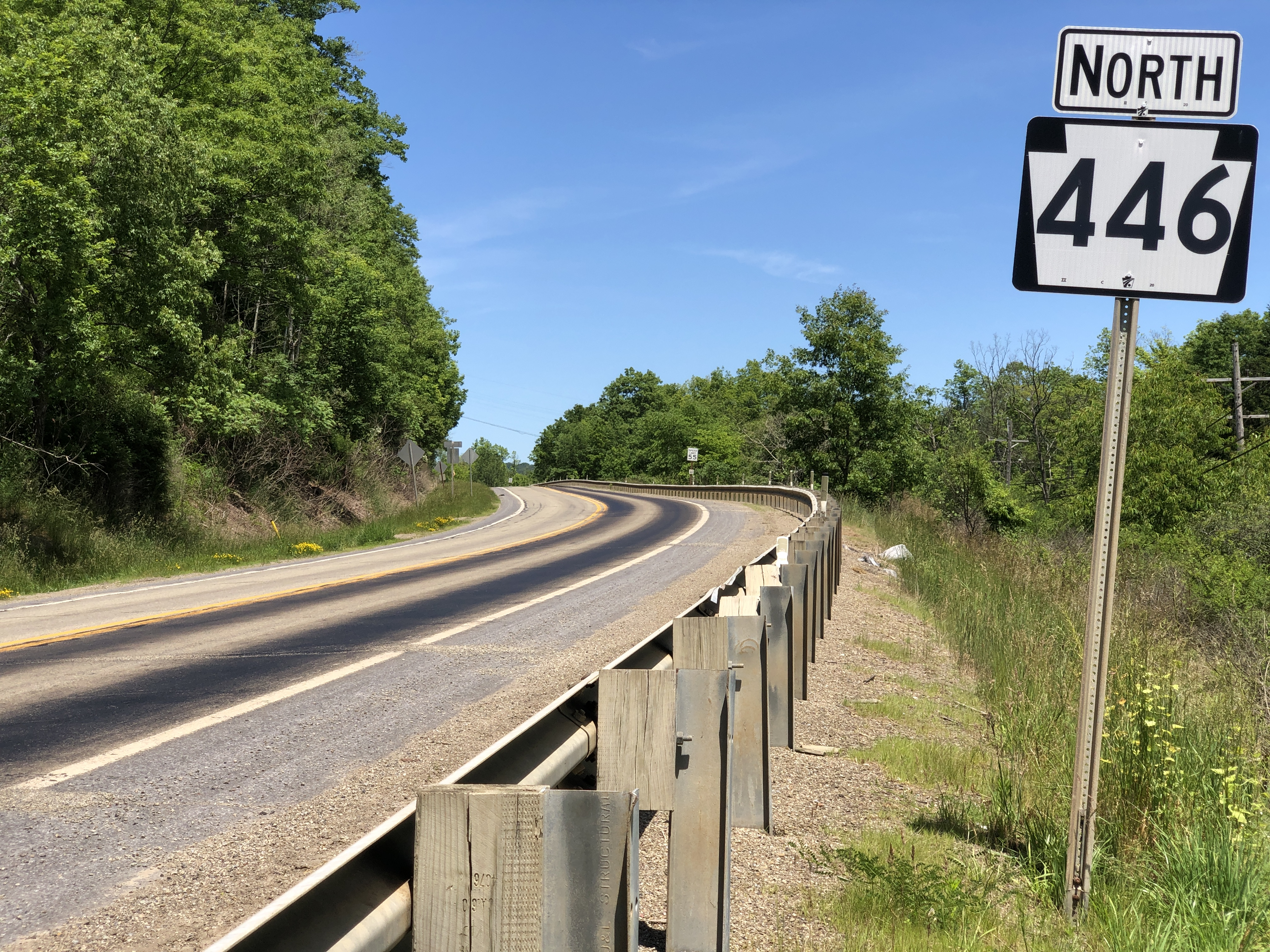
- PA 446 in Eldred Township

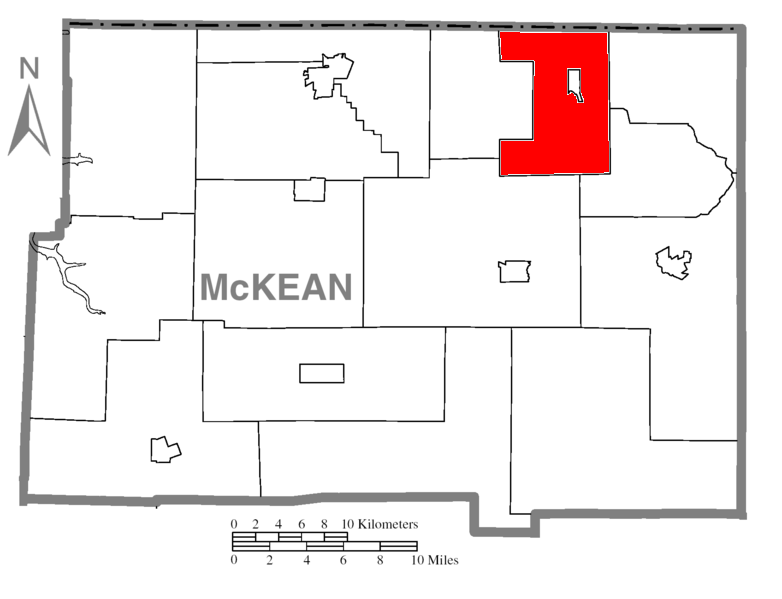
- Location in McKean County

- Location of McKean County in Pennsylvania
- Country: United States
- State: Pennsylvania
- County: McKean
- Settled: 1785
- Incorporated: 1843

Area
  - Total: 39.06 sq mi (101.2 km^{2})
  - Land: 38.56 sq mi (99.9 km^{2})
  - Water: 0.50 sq mi (1.3 km^{2})

Population (2020)
  - Total: 1,394 ▼
  - Estimate (2022): 1,365
  - Density: 39.8/sq mi (15.35/km^{2})
- Time zone: UTC-5 (Eastern (EST))
  - Summer (DST): UTC-4 (EDT)
- ZIP Code: 16731 (Eldred)
- Area code: 814
- FIPS code: 42-083-22896
- Website: eldredtownship1673.wixsite.com/eldred-township-muni

Eldred Township is a township in McKean County, Pennsylvania, United States. The population was 1,394 at the 2020 census, down from 1,592 in 2010.

== History ==
Eldred Township, like the borough of Eldred, is named for Judge Nathaniel B. Eldred.

== Geography ==
The township is in northeastern McKean County, with its northern border following the New York state line. The borough of Eldred, a separate municipality, is surrounded by the north-central part of the township.

According to the United States Census Bureau, Eldred Township has a total area of 39.1 square miles (101 km^{2}), of which 38.5 square miles (100 km^{2}) are land and 0.5 square miles (1.3 km^{2}), or 1.28%, are water. The Allegheny River flows from south to north through the center of the township. Potato Creek flows into the river in the southern end of the township, and Knapp Creek comes in from the west near the borough of Eldred.

== Demographics ==
Historical population
Census	Pop.	Note	%±
2000	1,696		—
2010	1,592		−6.1%
2020	1,394		−12.4%
2022 (est.)	1,365		−2.1%
U.S. Decennial Census

As of the census of 2000, there were 1,696 people, 686 households, and 487 families residing in the township. The population density was 43.1 inhabitants per square mile (16.6/km^{2}). There were 783 housing units at an average density of 19.9/sq mi (7.7/km^{2}). The racial makeup of the township was 99.35% White, 0.12% African American, 0.06% Native American, 0.06% Asian, and 0.41% from two or more races. Hispanic or Latino of any race were 0.06% of the population.

There were 686 households, out of which 30.6% had children under the age of 18 living with them, 58.2% were married couples living together, 7.7% had a female householder with no husband present, and 28.9% were non-families. 24.3% of all households were made up of individuals, and 9.6% had someone living alone who was 65 years of age or older. The average household size was 2.47 and the average family size was 2.93.

In the township the population was spread out, with 24.6% under the age of 18, 6.7% from 18 to 24, 27.8% from 25 to 44, 29.0% from 45 to 64, and 12.0% who were 65 years of age or older. The median age was 39 years. For every 100 females there were 99.8 males. For every 100 females age 18 and over, there were 95.7 males.

The median income for a household in the township was $33,750, and the median income for a family was $40,278. Males had a median income of $31,105 versus $22,241 for females. The per capita income for the township was $15,361. About 11.2% of families and 13.4% of the population were below the poverty line, including 17.7% of those under age 18 and 7.8% of those age 65 or over.
