= Man Crazy (1927 film) =

1927 film

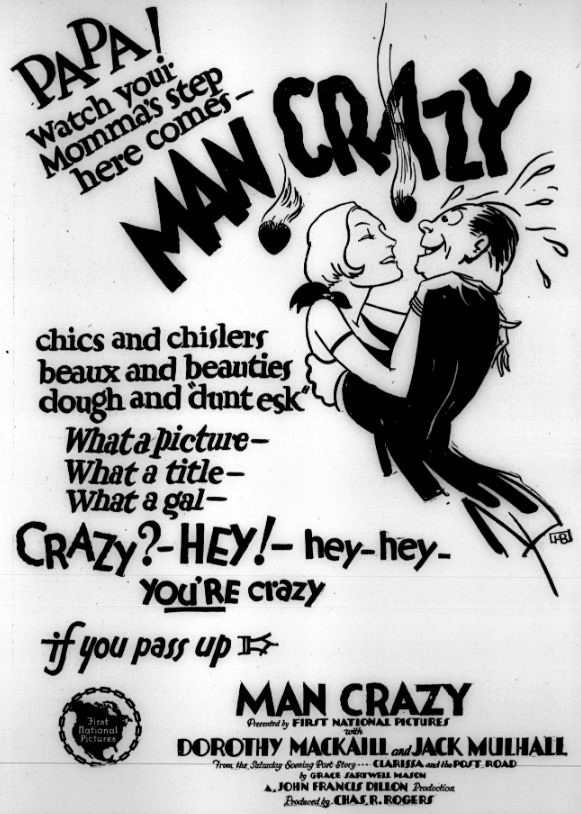
- Advertisement
- Directed by: John Francis Dillon
- Screenplay by: Dwinelle Benthall; Rufus McCosh; Perry Nathan
- Based on: Clarissa and the Post Road by Grace Sartwell Mason
- Produced by: Charles R. Rogers
- Starring: Dorothy Mackaill; Jack Mulhall; Edythe Chapman; Phillips Smalley
- Cinematography: James Van Trees
- Production company: Charles R. Rogers Productions
- Distributed by: First National Pictures
- Release date: November 27, 1927
- Running time: 60 minutes
- Country: United States
- Language: Silent (English intertitles)

Man Crazy is a 1927 American silent comedy film directed by John Francis Dillon and written by Dwinelle Benthall, Rufus McCosh, and Perry Nathan. The film stars Dorothy Mackaill, Jack Mulhall, Edythe Chapman, Phillips Smalley, Walter McGrail, and Ray Hallor. Man Crazy was released on November 27, 1927, by First National Pictures.

== Cast ==
- Dorothy Mackaill as Clarissa Janeway
- Jack Mulhall as Jeffery Pell
- Edythe Chapman as Grandmother Janeway
- Phillips Smalley as James Janeway
- Walter McGrail as Van Breamer
- Ray Hallor as Danny

== Preservation ==
With no prints of Man Crazy located in any film archives, it is a lost film.
