= Liberty Township, McKean County, Pennsylvania =

Township in Pennsylvania, US

Coordinates: 41°50′00″N 78°13′59″W

- Township
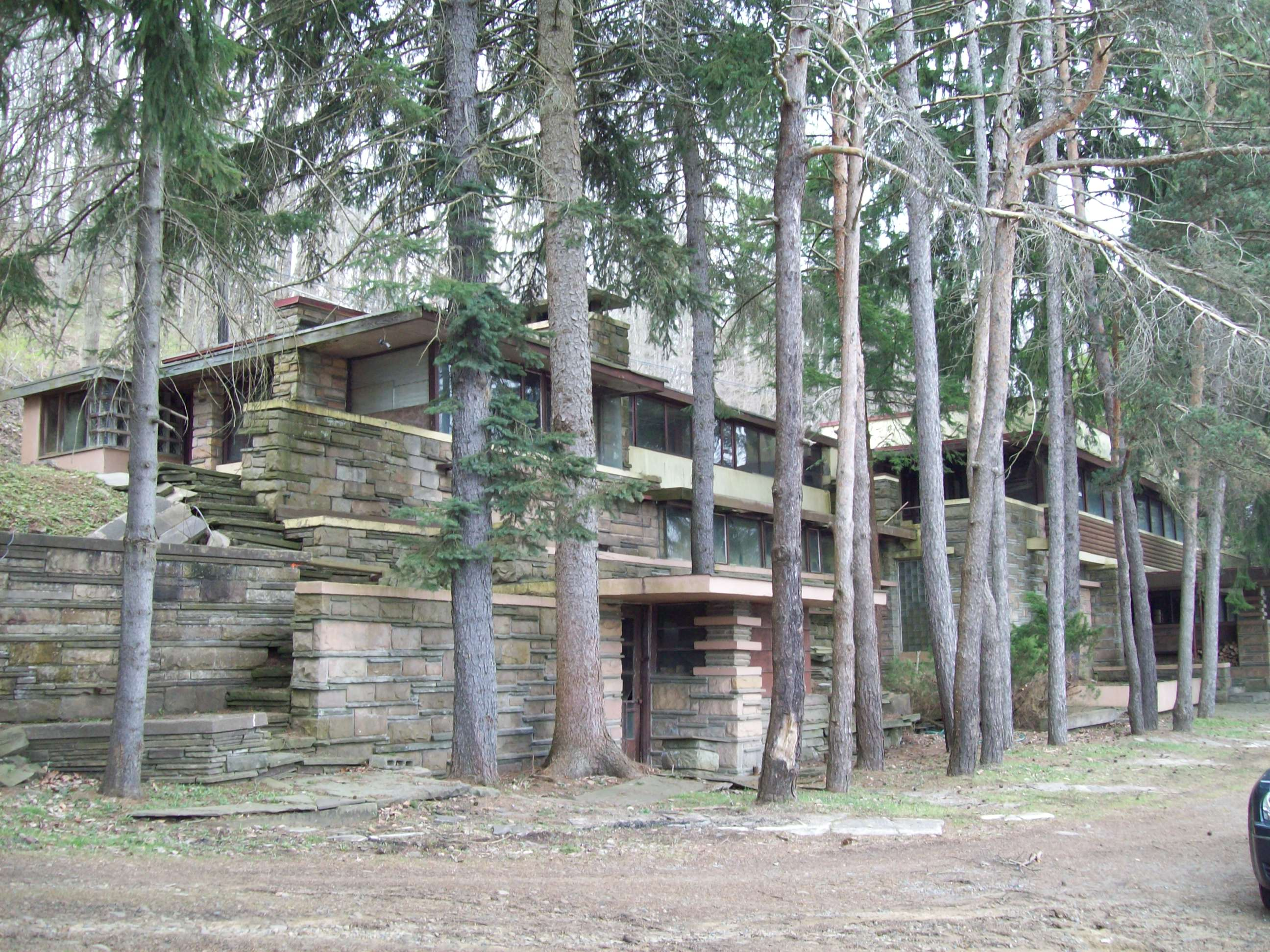
- Lynn Hall, a historic site in the township

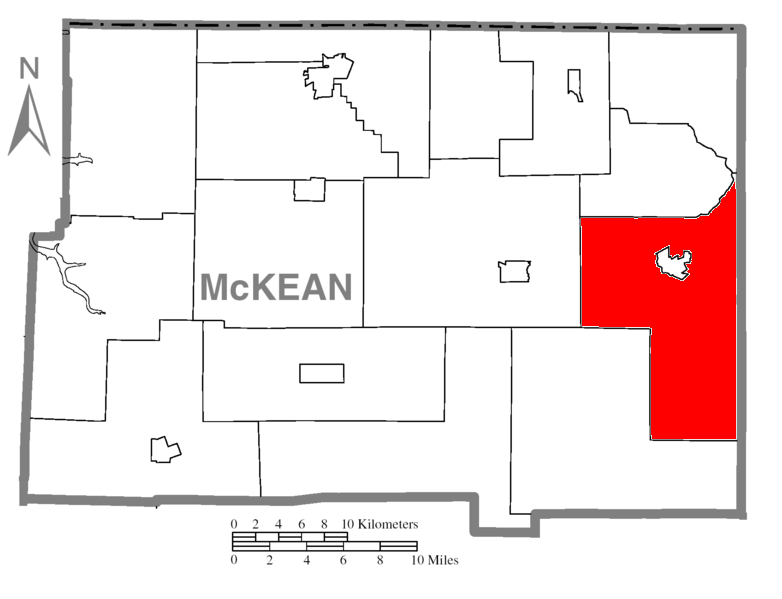
- Map of McKean County, Pennsylvania highlighting Liberty Township

- Map of McKean County, Pennsylvania
- Country: United States
- State: Pennsylvania
- County: McKean
- Settled: 1785
- Incorporated: 1828

Area
  - Total: 83.73 sq mi (216.86 km^{2})
  - Land: 83.34 sq mi (215.86 km^{2})
  - Water: 0.39 sq mi (1.00 km^{2})

Population (2020)
  - Total: 1,604 ▼
  - Estimate (2022): 1,564
  - Density: 18.5/sq mi (7.13/km^{2})
- Time zone: UTC-5 (Eastern (EST))
  - Summer (DST): UTC-4 (EDT)
- Area code: 814
- FIPS code: 42-083-43096

Liberty Township is a township in McKean County, Pennsylvania, United States. The population was 1,604 at the time of the census.

== History ==
Lynn Hall was listed on the National Register of Historic Places in 2007.

== Geography ==
According to the United States Census Bureau, the township has a total area of 83.5 square miles (216.3 km^{2}), all of it land.

== Demographics ==
Historical population
Census	Pop.	Note	%±
2000	1,726		—
2010	1,612		−6.6%
2020	1,604		−0.5%
2022 (est.)	1,564		−2.5%
U.S. Decennial Census

As of the census of 2000, there were 1,726 people, 704 households, and 496 families residing in the township.

The population density was 20.7 people per square mile (8.0/km^{2}). There were 898 housing units at an average density of 10.8/sq mi (4.2/km^{2}).

The racial makeup of the township was 97.97% White, 0.12% African American, 0.23% Native American, 0.06% Pacific Islander, 0.52% from other races, and 1.10% from two or more races. Hispanic or Latino of any race were 0.58% of the population.

There were 704 households, out of which 31.4% had children under the age of eighteen living with them; 55.4% were married couples living together, 9.1% had a female householder with no husband present, and 29.5% were non-families. 24.1% of all households were made up of individuals, and 10.7% had someone living alone who was sixty-five years of age or older.

The average household size was 2.45 and the average family size was 2.88.

In the township the population was spread out, with 24.9% under the age of eighteen, 6.1% from eighteen to twenty-four, 28.7% from twenty-five to forty-four, 25.0% from forty-five to sixty-four, and 15.3% who were sixty-five years of age or older. The median age was thirty-nine years.

For every one hundred females there were 104.5 males. For every one hundred females who were aged eighteen and over, there were 103.6 males.

The median income for a household in the township was $34,200, and the median income for a family was $40,761. Males had a median income of $33,500 compared with that of $20,817 for females.

The per capita income for the township was $16,434.

Roughly 8.3% of families and 13.5% of the population were living below the poverty line, including 15.1% of those who were under the age of eighteen and 12.1% of those who were aged sixty-five or older.
