= Eldred, Pennsylvania =

Borough in Pennsylvania, US

- Borough
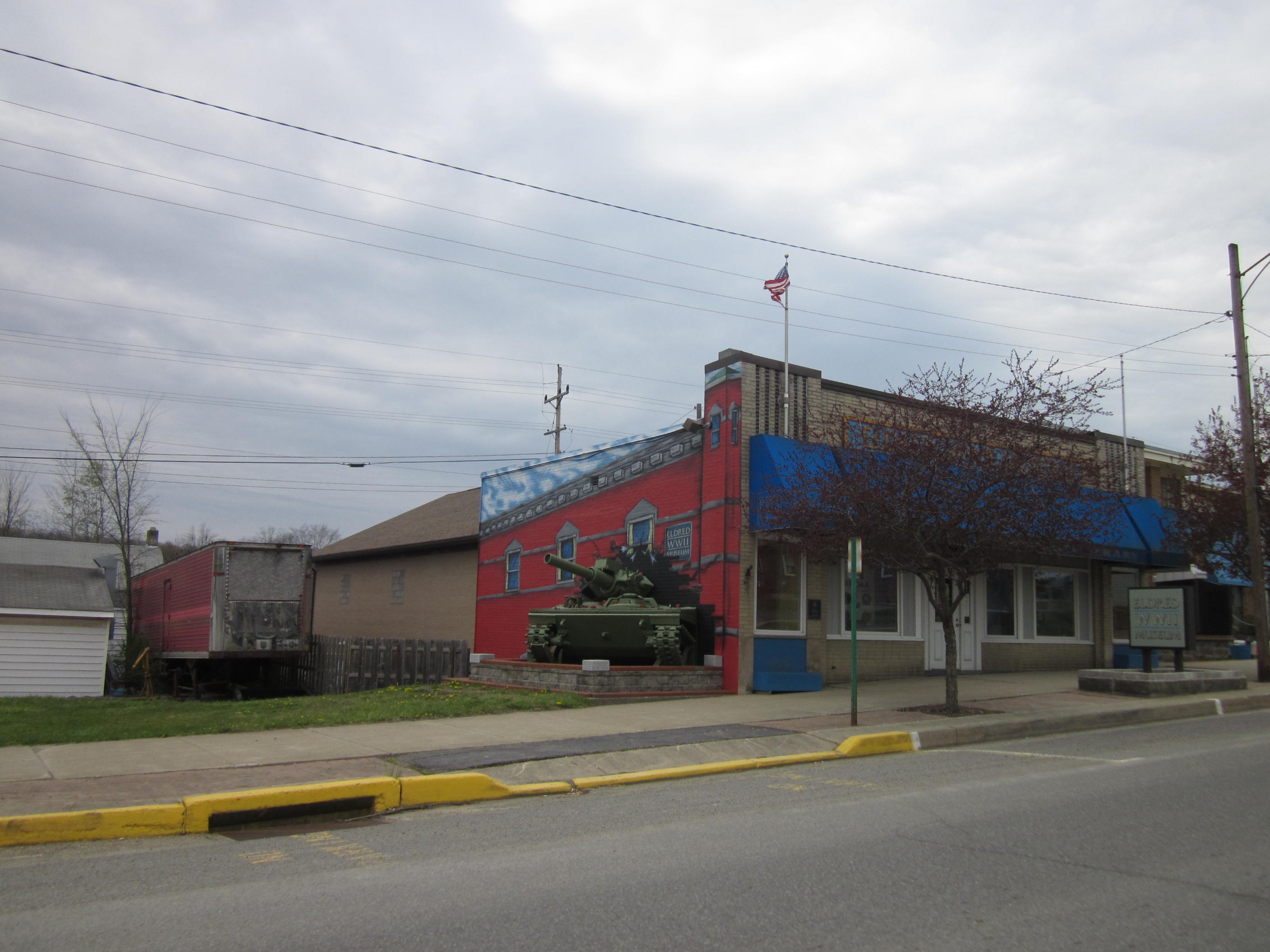
- Downtown Eldred

- Location in McKean County and the state of Pennsylvania

- Location within Pennsylvania Location within the United States
- Coordinates: 41°57′24″N 78°23′01″W
- Country: United States
- State: Pennsylvania
- County: McKean
- Settled: 1815
- Incorporated: 1880

Area
  - Total: 0.91 sq mi (2.35 km^{2})
  - Land: 0.88 sq mi (2.27 km^{2})
  - Water: 0.031 sq mi (0.08 km^{2})

Population (2020)
  - Total: 765
  - Density: 874.0/sq mi (337.45/km^{2})
- Time zone: UTC-5 (Eastern (EST))
  - Summer (DST): UTC-4 (EDT)
- ZIP code: 16731
- Area code: 814
- FIPS code: 42-22888
- Website: https://eldredborough.jimdofree.com/

Eldred is a borough in McKean County, Pennsylvania, United States. The population was 765 at the 2020 census.

== History ==
Eldred is named for Judge Nathaniel B. Eldred.

== Geography ==
Eldred is located in northeastern McKean County at 41°57′24″N 78°23′1″W (41.956725, -78.383579). It is less than 3 miles (5 km) south of the New York state line.

Pennsylvania Route 446 passes through the borough as Main Street. It leads south 13 miles (21 km) to Smethport, the McKean county seat, and north 7 miles (11 km) to Portville, New York, changing to New York State Route 305 at the state line. Pennsylvania Route 346 has its eastern terminus in Eldred and leads west 17 miles (27 km) to Bradford.

According to the U.S. Census Bureau, the borough of Eldred has a total area of 0.91 square miles (2.36 km^{2}), of which 0.03 square miles (0.08 km^{2}), or 3.42%, are water. Eldred is in the valley of the Allegheny River, mainly on the east side. The river forms part of the southwestern border of the borough, passes to the west of the main part of the borough, then cuts across the northwest corner on its way north toward New York state. Barden Brook passes through the center of the borough, then flows north to join the Allegheny in the northwest corner of the borough.

== Demographics ==
Historical population
Census	Pop.	Note	%±
1880	1,165		—
1890	1,050		−9.9%
1900	963		−8.3%
1910	1,235		28.2%
1920	1,037		−16.0%
1930	1,118		7.8%
1940	1,051		−6.0%
1950	1,199		14.1%
1960	1,107		−7.7%
1970	1,092		−1.4%
1980	965		−11.6%
1990	869		−9.9%
2000	858		−1.3%
2010	825		−3.8%
2020	765		−7.3%
2021 (est.)	747	▼	−2.4%

As of the census of 2010, there were 825 people, 345 households, and 224 families residing in the borough. The population density was 919.67 inhabitants per square mile (355.09/km^{2}). There were 402 housing units at an average density of 446.67 per square mile (172.46/km^{2}). The racial makeup of the borough was 96.48% White, 0.12% Native American, 0.97% from other races, and 2.06% from two or more races. Hispanic or Latino of any race were 2.42% of the population.

There were 345 households, out of which 31% had children under the age of 18 living with them, 42% were married couples living together, 16.8% had a female householder with no husband present, and 35.1% were non-families. 30.4% of all households were made up of individuals, and 16.9% had someone living alone who was 65 years of age or older. The average household size was 2.39 and the average family size was 2.92.

In the borough the population was spread out, with 23.6% under the age of 20, 5.9% from 20 to 24, 25.3% from 25 to 44, 19.9% from 45 to 64, and 18% who were 65 years of age or older. The median age was 37.2 years. For every 100 females there were 87.9 males.

In 2000, the median income for a household in the borough was $27,569, and the median income for a family was $34,375. Males had a median income of $30,347 versus $19,375 for females. The per capita income for the borough was $15,674. About 17.1% of families and 17.3% of the population were below the poverty line, including 31.1% of those under age 18 and 2.5% of those age 65 or over.

== Culture ==
Eldred is the home of the Kendall Bridge. This bridge is reportedly one of only a few bridges in the world in which a road turns off the suspended section off the bridge creating a suspended intersection. This bridge also spans the Allegheny River, a small road, as well as a railroad line that runs through the small town. This railroad is owned by Western New York & Pennsylvania Rail Road.

Eldred is also home to the World War II Museum. During the war, Eldred was the site of a munitions plant that produced eight million bombs, mortar shells and fuses. Fifteen hundred people worked there, 24 hours a day, from January 1942 to May 1945, supporting the war effort. The museum opened on Memorial Day 1996 and is dedicated to the U.S. fighting forces and the 40 million people on the homefront who provided the materials needed to win the war.

== Education ==
It is in the Otto-Eldred School District.

== Fire Apparatus Museum ==
The Andy Leider Fire Truck Collection is moving from Middletown, NY to Eldred. They bought the old Ethan Allen property to greatly expand the current facility. “We will now have the largest vintage motorized fire truck museum, restoration plant, and storage facility in the country, located at the former Ethan Allen property in Eldred,” Leider said. “We look forward to opening our new facility in McKean County, Pennsylvania.”
