= Portage Township, Potter County, Pennsylvania =

Township in Pennsylvania, US

Coordinates: 41°36′57″N 78°04′23″W

Portage Township, Pennsylvania
- Township
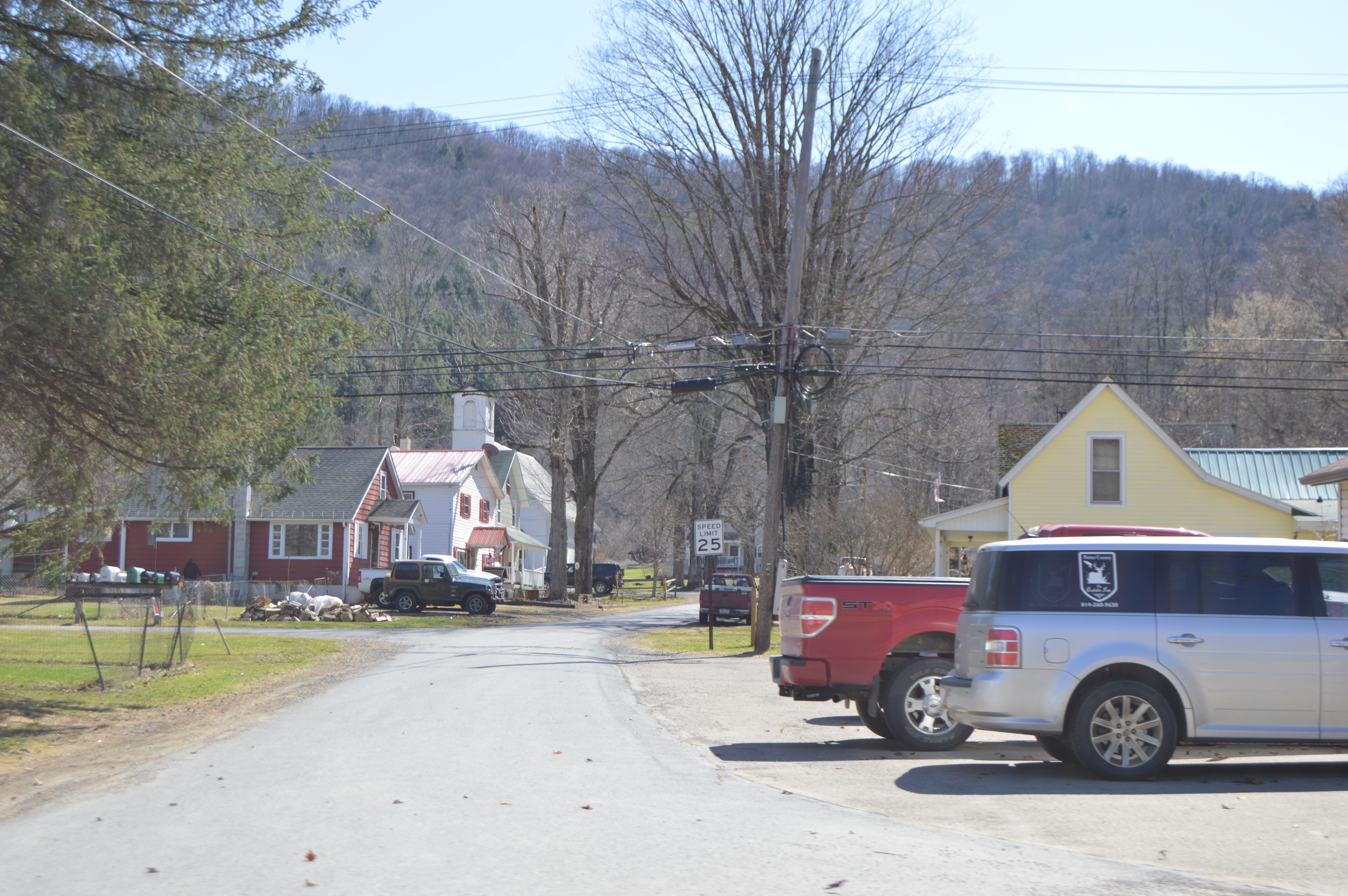
- Street scene in Costello

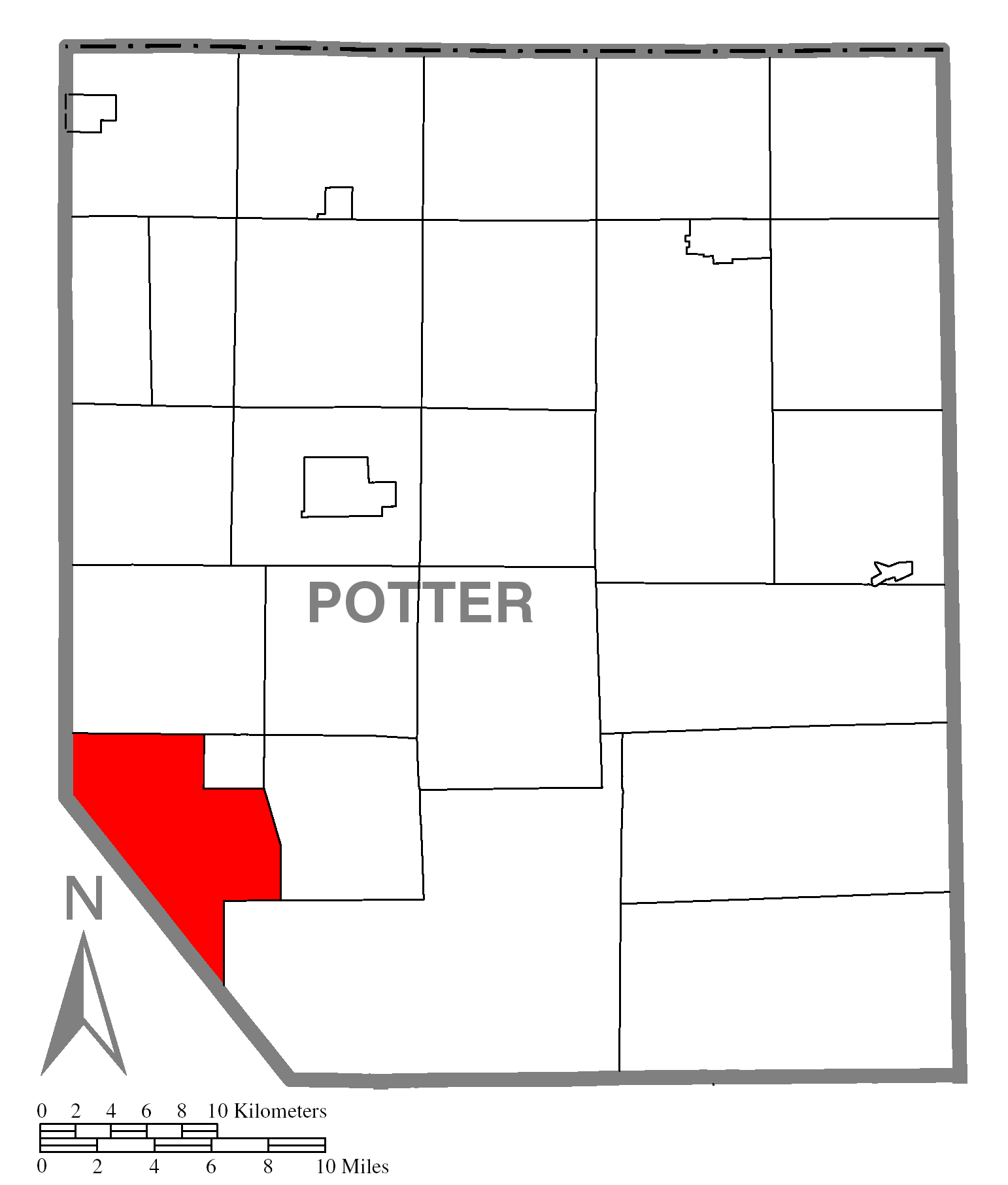
- Map of Potter County, Pennsylvania highlighting Portage Township

- Map of Potter County, Pennsylvania
- Country: United States
- State: Pennsylvania
- County: Potter
- Incorporated: 1860

Government
  - Fire District: Austin Volunteer Fire Dept.

Area
  - Total: 37.53 sq mi (97.21 km^{2})
  - Land: 37.53 sq mi (97.21 km^{2})
  - Water: 0 sq mi (0.00 km^{2})

Population (2020)
  - Total: 163 ▼
  - Estimate (2021): 162
  - Density: 5.8/sq mi (2.25/km^{2})
- Time zone: UTC-5 (Eastern (EST))
  - Summer (DST): UTC-4 (EDT)
- Area code: 814
- FIPS code: 42-105-62072

Portage Township is a township in Potter County, Pennsylvania, United States. The population was 163 at the 2020 census.

== Geography ==
According to the United States Census Bureau, the township has a total area of 37.7 square miles (97.5 km^{2}), all land.

Portage Township is bordered by Keating Township to the north, the borough of Austin to the east and north, Sylvania Township to the east, Wharton Township to the south and east, Cameron County to the southwest and McKean County to the west.

== Demographics ==
Historical population
Census	Pop.	Note	%±
2000	223		—
2010	228		2.2%
2020	163		−28.5%
2021 (est.)	162		−0.6%
U.S. Decennial Census

As of the census of 2000, there were 223 people, 95 households, and 70 families residing in the township. The population density was 5.9 people per square mile (2.3/km^{2}). There were 257 housing units at an average density of 6.8/sq mi (2.6/km^{2}). The racial makeup of the township was 97.76% White, 0.45% Asian, and 1.79% from two or more races. Hispanic or Latino of any race were 0.45% of the population.

There were 95 households, out of which 27.4% had children under the age of 18 living with them, 60.0% were married couples living together, 8.4% had a female householder with no husband present, and 26.3% were non-families. 22.1% of all households were made up of individuals, and 9.5% had someone living alone who was 65 years of age or older. The average household size was 2.35 and the average family size was 2.71.

In the township the population was spread out, with 20.2% under the age of 18, 5.8% from 18 to 24, 23.8% from 25 to 44, 32.3% from 45 to 64, and 17.9% who were 65 years of age or older. The median age was 46 years. For every 100 females there were 97.3 males. For every 100 females age 18 and over, there were 93.5 males.

The median income for a household in the township was $42,083, and the median income for a family was $41,875. Males had a median income of $28,281 versus $25,625 for females. The per capita income for the township was $19,404. About 6.1% of families and 7.3% of the population were below the poverty line, including 25.8% of those under the age of 18 and none of those 65 or over.
