= Keating Summit, Pennsylvania =

Unincorporated community in Pennsylvania, US

- Unincorporated community
- Location within Pennsylvania
- Coordinates: 41°40′51″N 78°10′52″W
- Country: United States
- State: Pennsylvania
- County: Potter
- Elevation: 1,906 ft (581 m)
- Time zone: UTC-5 (Eastern (EST))
  - Summer (DST): UTC-4 (EDT)
- Area code: 814
- GNIS feature ID: 1178271

Keating Summit (also Forest Home) is an unincorporated community in Keating Township, Potter County, Pennsylvania, United States.
