= Keating Township, Potter County, Pennsylvania =

Township in Pennsylvania, US

Coordinates: 41°42′00″N 78°09′59″W

Keating Township, Pennsylvania
- Township
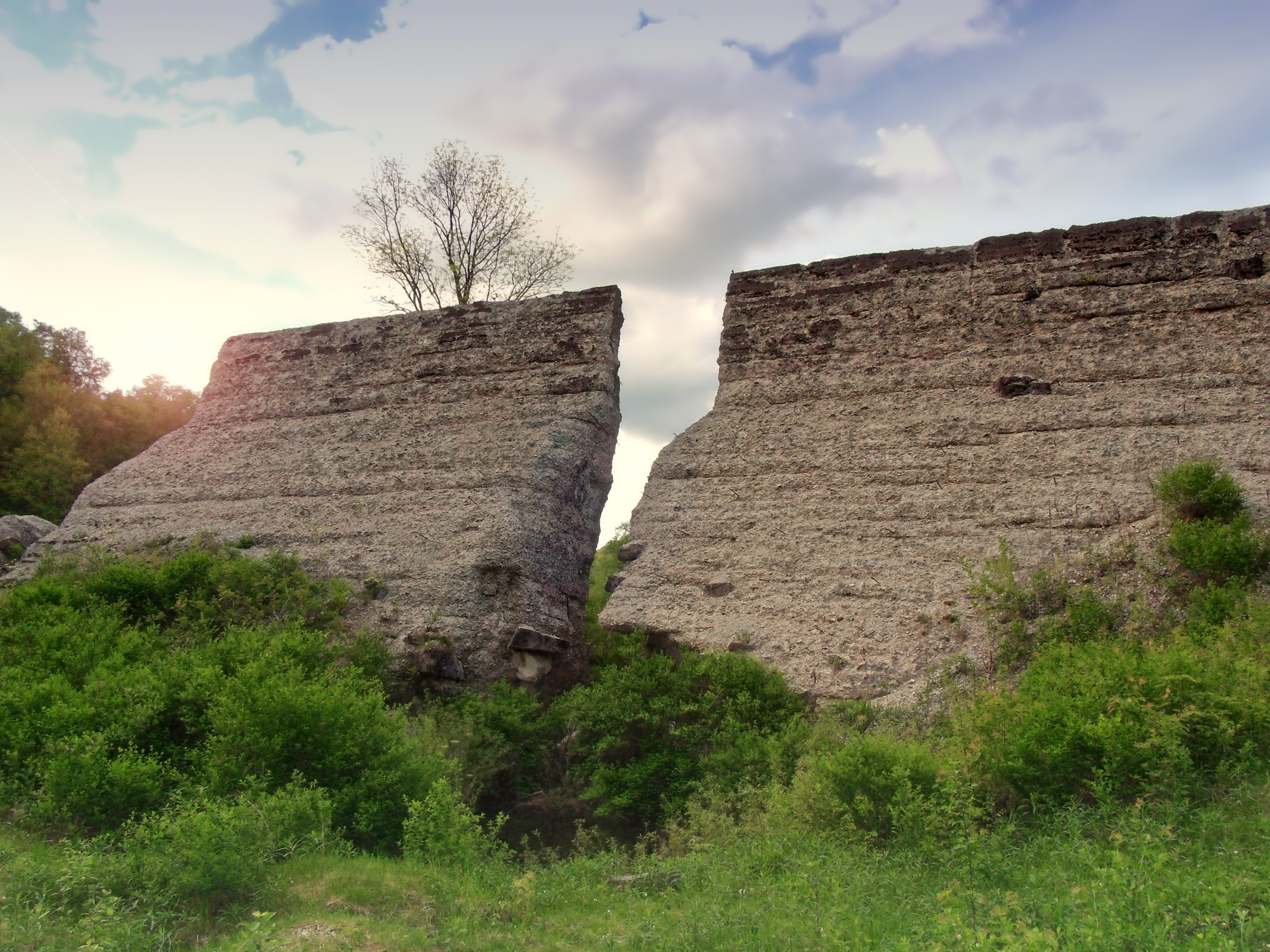
- Remnants of the failed Austin Dam in Keating Township

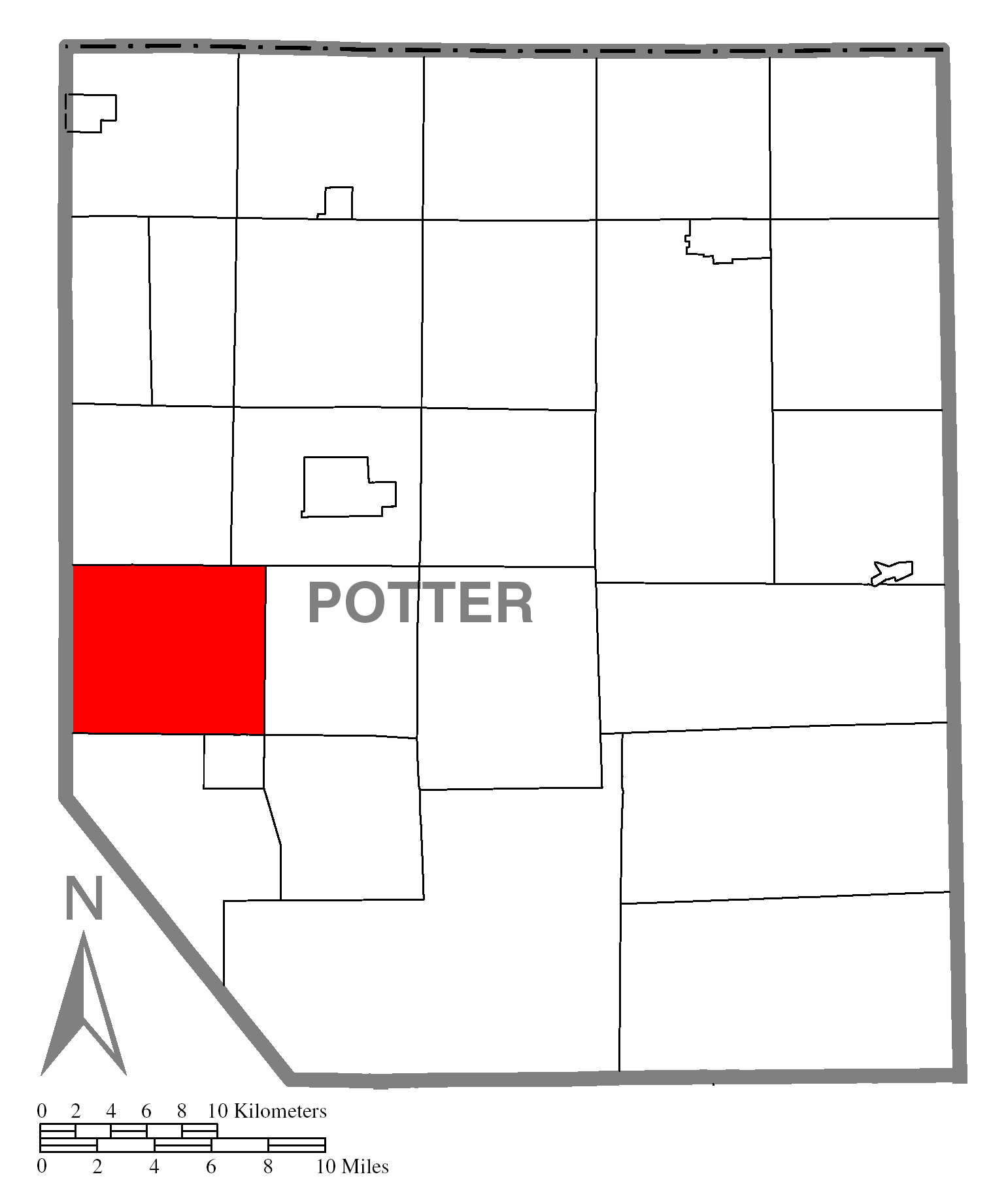
- Map of Potter County, Pennsylvania highlighting Keating Township

- Map of Potter County, Pennsylvania
- Country: United States
- State: Pennsylvania
- County: Potter
- Settled: 1849
- Incorporated: 1856

Government
  - Fire District: Austin Volunteer Fire Dept.

Area
  - Total: 41.55 sq mi (107.61 km^{2})
  - Land: 41.55 sq mi (107.61 km^{2})
  - Water: 0 sq mi (0.00 km^{2})

Population (2020)
  - Total: 289 ▼
  - Estimate (2021): 288
  - Density: 7.3/sq mi (2.8/km^{2})
- Time zone: UTC-5 (EST)
  - Summer (DST): UTC-4 (EDT)
- FIPS code: 42-105-38920

Keating Township is a township in Potter County, Pennsylvania, United States. The population was 289 at the 2020 census.

== Geography ==
According to the United States Census Bureau, the township has a total area of 41.4 square miles (107 km^{2}), all land.

Keating Township is bordered by Roulette and Eulalia Townships to the north, Homer Township to the east, the borough of Austin and Portage Township to the south and McKean County to the west.

== Demographics ==
Historical population
| Census | Pop. | Note | %± |
|---|---|---|---|
| 2000 | 307 | | — |
| 2010 | 312 | | 1.6% |
| 2020 | 289 | | −7.4% |
| 2021 (est.) | 288 | | −0.3% |
U.S. Decennial Census

As of the census of 2000, there were 307 people, 128 households, and 92 families residing in the township. The population density was 7.4 people per square mile (2.9/km^{2}). There were 398 housing units at an average density of 9.6/sq mi (3.7/km^{2}). The racial makeup of the township was 99.02% White, 0.33% African American, 0.33% Native American, 0.33% from other races. Hispanic or Latino of any race were 1.95% of the population.

There were 128 households, out of which 24.2% had children under the age of 18 living with them, 64.1% were married couples living together, 5.5% had a female householder with no husband present, and 28.1% were non-families. 23.4% of all households were made up of individuals, and 5.5% had someone living alone who was 65 years of age or older. The average household size was 2.40 and the average family size was 2.76.

In the township the population was spread out, with 22.5% under the age of 18, 3.6% from 18 to 24, 23.8% from 25 to 44, 33.6% from 45 to 64, and 16.6% who were 65 years of age or older. The median age was 45 years. For every 100 females, there were 104.7 males. For every 100 females age 18 and over, there were 105.2 males.

The median income for a household in the township was $30,417, and the median income for a family was $32,500. Males had a median income of $30,938 versus $21,250 for females. The per capita income for the township was $13,716. About 9.3% of families and 12.2% of the population were below the poverty line, including 2.8% of those under the age of 18 and 14.7% of those 65 or over.
