= Coudersport Area Junior/Senior High School =

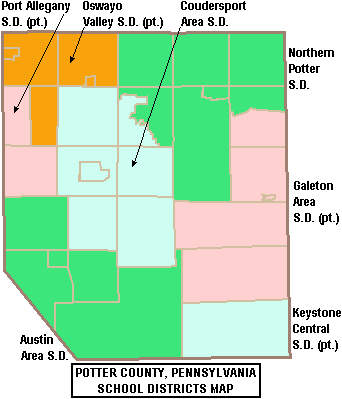

Location
- 698 Dwight Street; Coudersport, Potter County, Pennsylvania 16915-1638; United States
- Coordinates: 41.773376°N 78.010354°W

Information
- School type: Public secondary school
- School board: 9
- School district: Coudersport Area School District
- NCES District ID: 4206930
- Superintendent: Drew Kyle
- School code: PA-109531304-3869
- CEEB code: 390880
- NCES School ID: 420693003869
- Principal: Dan Eskesen
- Teaching staff: 23.80 (on an FTE basis)
- Grades: 7–12
- Enrollment: 310 (2023-2024)
  - Grade 7: 66
  - Grade 8: 46
  - Grade 9: 41
  - Grade 10: 43
  - Grade 11: 54
  - Grade 12: 60
- Student to teacher ratio: 13.03
- Language: American English
- Campus type: Rural: remote
- Athletics conference: PIAA
- Nickname: Falcons
- USNWR ranking: 13,242–17,655
- Feeder schools: Coudersport Area Elementary School
- Website: www.coudyschools.net/page/coudersport-jrsr-high-school

Coudersport Area Junior/Senior High School is a small, rural public secondary school in Coudersport, Pennsylvania, United States. In 2022–2023, the school enrolled 275 pupils in grades 7–12. The school serves the Borough of Coudersport and the southern and western portions of Allegany Township, Eulalia Township, Hebron Township, Homer Township, Summit Township and Sweden Township. Coudersport Area Junior Senior High School is the sole secondary school operated by the Coudersport Area School District.

High school students may attend Seneca Highlands Career and Technical Center for training in the culinary arts, allied health services, automotive mechanics, construction, and mechanical trades. The center is located in neighboring McKean County. The Seneca Highlands Intermediate Unit IU9 provides the Coudersport Area School District with several services, including specialized education for disabled students and hearing, speech, and visual disability services and professional development for staff and faculty.

== Extracurricular activities ==
The school offers various clubs, activities, and athletics. The district has a Cooperative Sports Agreement with Austin Area School District which allows Autin area students to participate in the district's sports programs. The following student activities are available:

- Drama Club
- Falcon newspaper
- FFA
- Interact
- National Honor Society
- Student Council
- Varsity Club
- Yearbook
- Jazz Ensemble
- Marching Band
- Music Council
- Show Choir

=== Athletics ===
Coudersport participates in PIAA District 9.

Sport name	Boys/class	Girls/class
Baseball	Class A	
Basketball	Class A	Class A
Cross country	Class AA	Class AA
Football	Class A	
Golf	Class AAAA	Class AAAA
Soccer	Class A	
Softball		Class A
Track and field	Class AA	Class AA
Volleyball		Class A
Wrestling	Class AA	
