= Austin Area School District =

School district in Pennsylvania

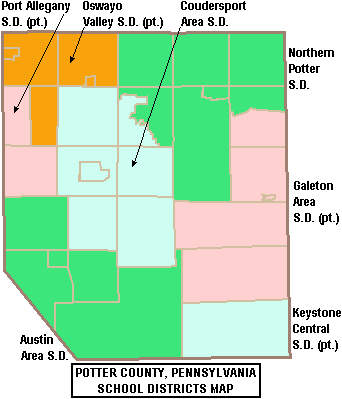

Address
- 138 Costello Avenue Austin, Potter County, Pennsylvania, 16720-9601; United States

District information
- Type: Public

Other information
- Website: www.austinsd.net

The Austin Area School District is a rural, public school district. It serves the Austin Borough as well as Keating, Portage, Sylvania and Wharton townships in Potter County, Pennsylvania. Austin Area School District encompasses approximately 228 square miles (590 km^{2}). According to 2000 federal census data, it served a resident population of 1,214 people. By 2010, the district served a resident population of 1,279 people. The educational attainment levels for the Austin Area School District population (25 years old and over) were 92% high school graduates and 7.5% college graduates. The district is one of the 500 public school districts of Pennsylvania.

According to the Pennsylvania Budget and Policy Center, 42% of the district's pupils lived at 185% or below the Federal Poverty level as shown by their eligibility for the federal free or reduced price school meal programs in 2012. In 2009, the district residents' per capita income was $14,405, while the median family income was $36,250. In Potter County, the median household income was $39,196. In the Commonwealth, the median family income was $49,501 and the United States median family income was $49,445, in 2010.

Austin Area School District operates Austin High School (7th–12th) and Austin Elementary School (preschool-6th). The school district campus is located in one building. High school students may attend Seneca Highlands Career and Technical Center for training in construction trades.

== Extracurriculars ==
Austin Area School District offers a variety of extracurriculars, including clubs, activities and extensive sports program.

=== Athletics ===
The district funds: Varsity:

Boys

- Basketball – Class A

Girls

- Basketball – Class A
- Softball – Class A
- Volleyball – Class A

Junior High School

- Boys - Basketball
- Girls - Basketball, Volleyball
- According to PIAA directory July 2015

Cooperative Sports The district has a cooperative sports agreement with the Coudersport Area School District in the following sports:

- Football
- Track and Field
- Soccer
- Wrestling
- Baseball
