= Austin High School (Austin, Pennsylvania) =

Coordinates: 41.6262°N 78.0885°W

Austin Area Junior Senior High School

Location
- 138 Costello Av. (State Rte. 872); Austin, Potter County, Pennsylvania 16720-9601; United States

Information
- Type: Public
- School district: Austin Area School District
- Principal: Kimberly Rees
- Teaching staff: 7.67 (FTE)
- Grades: 7-12
- Enrollment: 77 (2023–2024)
- Student to teacher ratio: 10.014
- Language: English
- Colors: Red and Black
- Mascot: Panthers
- Newspaper: The Paw Print
- Communities served: Austin
- Feeder schools: Austin Area Elementary School
- Website: http://www.austinsd.net

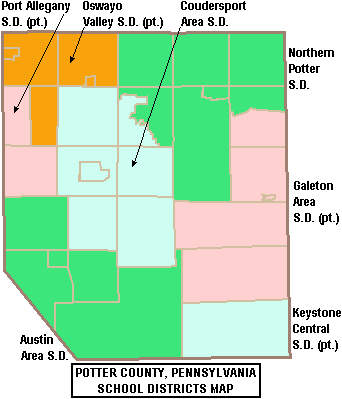
Austin Area School District region in Potter County

Austin Area Junior Senior High School is a diminutive, public high school in southern and rural Potter County, Pennsylvania. Austin Area Junior Senior High School serves grades 7–12 and is the smallest school in the state. Austin Area Junior Senior High School is located at 138 Costello Avenue, Austin. The School shares the kitchen and administrative offices with the adjoining Austin Area Elementary School, which makes up the entire Austin Area School District. In the 2017–2018 school year, Austin Area High School enrollment was 79 pupils in 7th through 12th grades.

== Extracurriculars ==
Austin Area School District offers a limited variety of clubs, activities and a publicly funded sports program.

== Athletics ==
Austin Area participates in District IX of the PIAA. Cooperative sports for those who wish to participate in a sport not held at the school is offered by the Coudersport Area School District.

=== Senior High Athletics ===
Sport	Boys	Girls
Basketball	Class A	Class A
Golf	Class AAAA	
Softball		Class A
Volleyball		Class A

=== Junior High Athletics ===
Boys

- Basketball

Girls

- Basketball
- Volleyball

== Organizations ==
There are a few organizations at the school.

- Band and Chorus
- Busted
- Enrichment
- FCCLA
- National Honor Society
- Newspaper
- Student Council
- Yearbook
- Yellow Ribbon
