= Austin Area =

Austin Area may refer to

- Greater Austin, Texas
- The Austin, Minnesota area
- The Austin, Pennsylvania area
