= Wharton Township, Pennsylvania =

Wharton Township is the name of some places in the U.S. state of Pennsylvania:

- Wharton Township, Fayette County, Pennsylvania
- Wharton Township, Potter County, Pennsylvania
