= Nagabashiri Wind Caves =

- 長走風穴
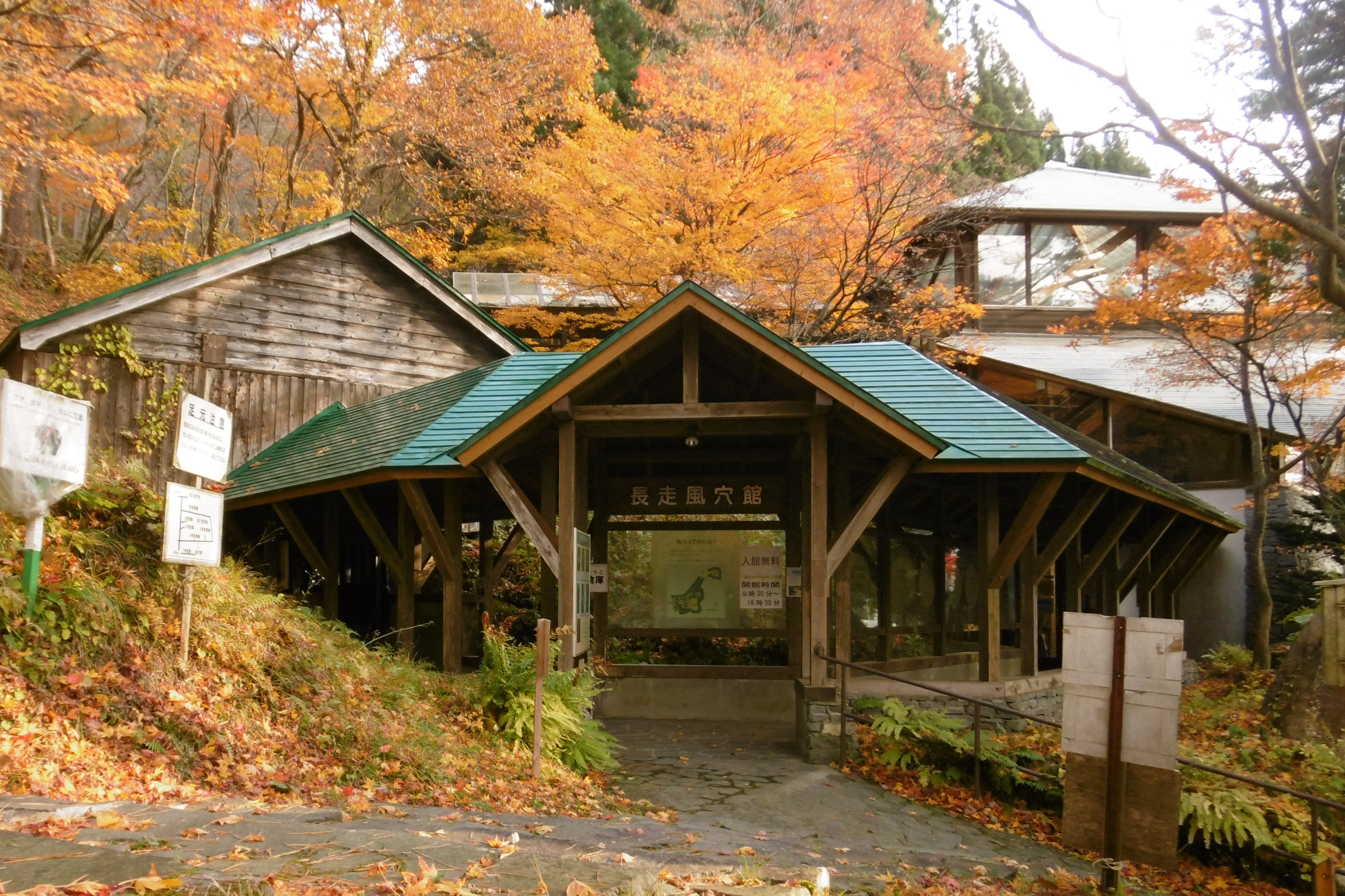
- The visitor center outside the caves.

- Location within Japan
- Location: 362-6 Nagabashiri, Ōdate, Akita Prefecture, Japan
- Coordinates: 40.381809°N 140.603761°E
- Elevation: 165 m (541 ft)
- Geology: Talus cave
- Access: Limited public access
- Lighting: Electric

The Nagabashiri Wind Caves (長走風穴, Nagabashiri fūketsu) are a system of talus caves about 15 km (9.3 mi) north of Ōdate along Japan National Route 7.

Even in midsummer, when the outside temperature is around 30 °C (86 °F), a cool wind of around 5–6 °C (41–42 °F) blows through the caves.

== History ==
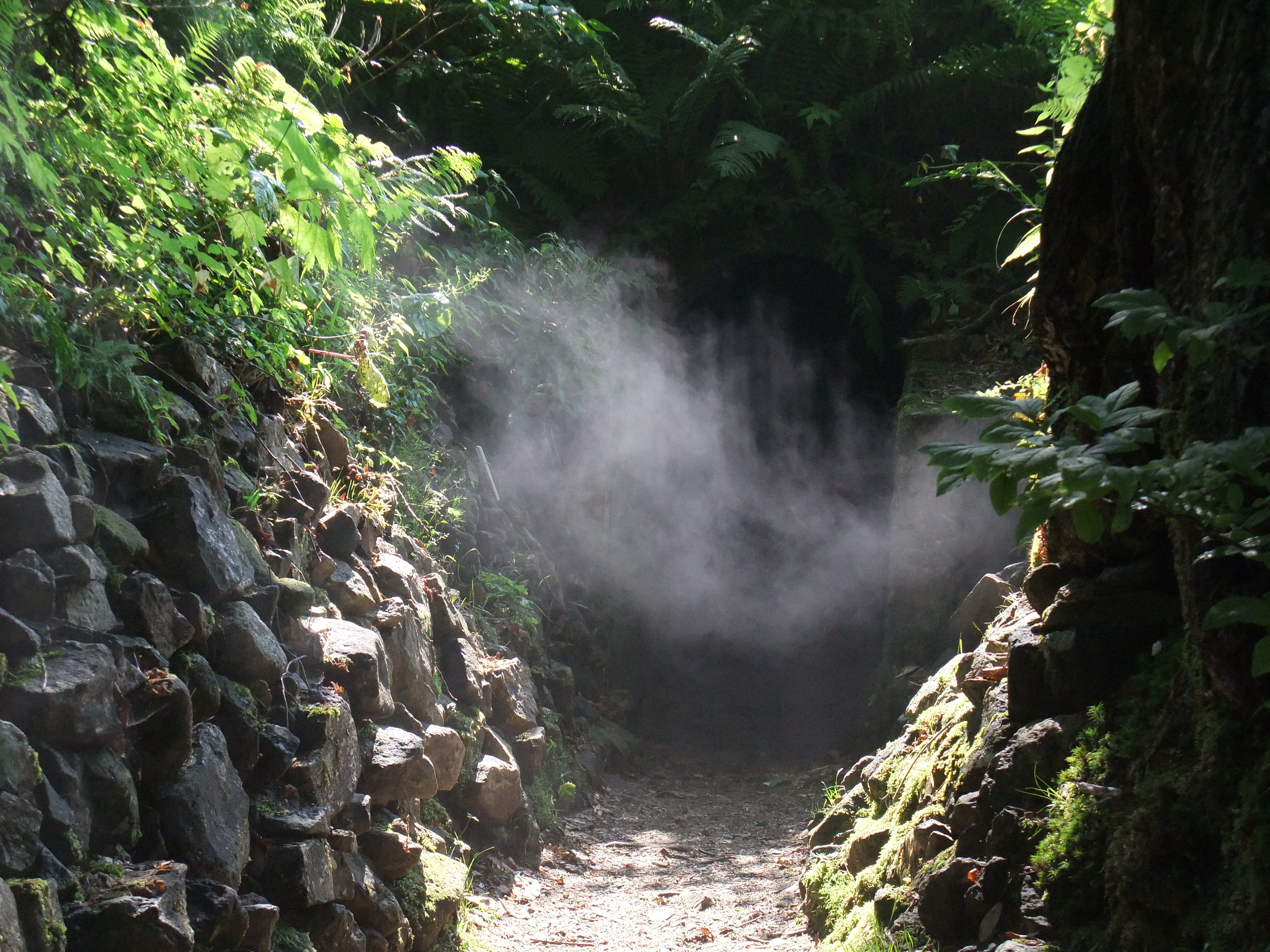
The entrance to Storehouse No. 2 (第二号倉庫). Note the fog created by condensation.

Higher on the slopes of Mt. Kunimi (国見山) is a vent into the caves which in turn act as an air duct facilitating the vertical transfer of heat. During the summer, cool air flows downward through the caves, while during winter the convection is reversed and warm air flows upward. About 24 m (79 ft) under the caves is the Shimizu-Katsura Spring (清水桂の泉) where cold groundwater rises.

Since ancient times an icehouse (氷室, himuro) stood at this site. The caves themselves had long been regarded as haunted.

In 1902, Sasaki Kōji (佐々木 耕治) of Ōuchi, later called the "Wind Cave King" (風穴王), realized the caves' potential as a natural refrigerator and began researching them. In 1912, Sasaki built the first of 7 cold storehouses connected to the caves' air circulation. Later, a total of more than 20 storehouses were built and these remained in use until the 1960s. They were mainly used to store apples.

In 1998, a visitor center for the caves built by the Agency for Cultural Affairs opened to the public. The visitor center is located at the entrance of Storehouse No. 1 (第一号倉庫) and contains a small museum. A restaurant, the Fūketsu Drive-In (風穴ドライブイン), is located across the street from the visitor center.

== See also ==
- Coudersport Ice Mine
