= Coudersport Area School District =

School district in Pennsylvania

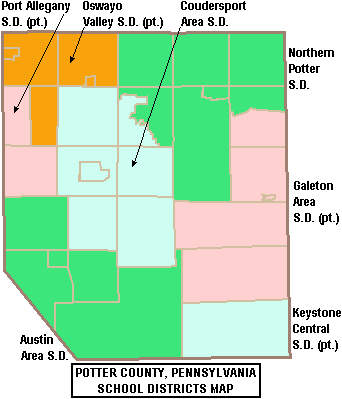

Address
- 698 Dwight Street Coudersport, Potter County, Pennsylvania, 16915-1638; United States

District information
- Type: Public
- Grades: K-12
- President: Carol Carts
- Vice-president: Sharon Deutschlander
- Superintendent: Drew Kyle
- Business administrator: John Abplanalp
- School board: 9
- Governing agency: Pennsylvania Department of Education
- Schools: 2
- Budget: $14,471,000
- NCES District ID: 4206930
- District ID: PA-109531304

Students and staff
- Students: 559
- Teachers: 57
- Staff: 42
- Student–teacher ratio: 9.81:1
- Athletic conference: PIAA

Other information
- Website: www.coudyschools.net

The Coudersport Area School District is a small rural, public school district in Coudersport, Pennsylvania, United States. The district covers the Borough of Coudersport, the southern and western portions of Allegany Township, and all of Eulalia Township, Hebron Township, Homer Township, Summit Township and Sweden Township in Potter County, Pennsylvania. Coudersport Area School District encompasses approximately 214 square miles (550 km^{2}).

The district operates two schools: the Coudersport Area Junior Senior High School (7–12) and Coudersport Elementary School (K-6). High school students may attend Seneca Highlands Career and Technical Center for construction and mechanical trades training. The Seneca Highlands Intermediate Unit IU9 provides the district with several services, including specialized education for disabled students, hearing, speech, and visual disability services, and professional development for staff and faculty.

== Location and area ==
According to 2000 US Census Bureau data, the district served a resident population of 5,892. By 2010, the district's population declined to 5,692 people. The educational attainment levels for the school district population (25 years old and over) were 90.9% high school graduates and 23.9% college graduates. The district is one of the 500 public school districts of Pennsylvania and one of seven operating in Potter County.

According to the Pennsylvania Budget and Policy Center, 41.9% of the district's pupils lived at 185% or below the federal poverty level, as shown by their eligibility for the federal free or reduced-price school meal programs in 2012. In 2009, Coudersport Area School District residents' per capita income was $20,176 while their median family income was $47,180. In Pennsylvania, the median family income was $49,501; the U.S. median family income was $49,445, in 2010. In Potter County, the median household income was $39,198. By 2013, the median household income in the United States rose to $52,100.

== Extracurricular activities ==
The district offers various clubs, activities, and athletics, including:

- Baseball
- Basketball
- Cross country running
- American football
- Golf
- Soccer
- Track and Field
- Wrestling
- Softball
- Volleyball
- Summer swim team at local pool.
