= Sylvania Township, Pennsylvania =

Township in Pennsylvania, US

Coordinates: 41°35′00″N 77°58′59″W

- Township
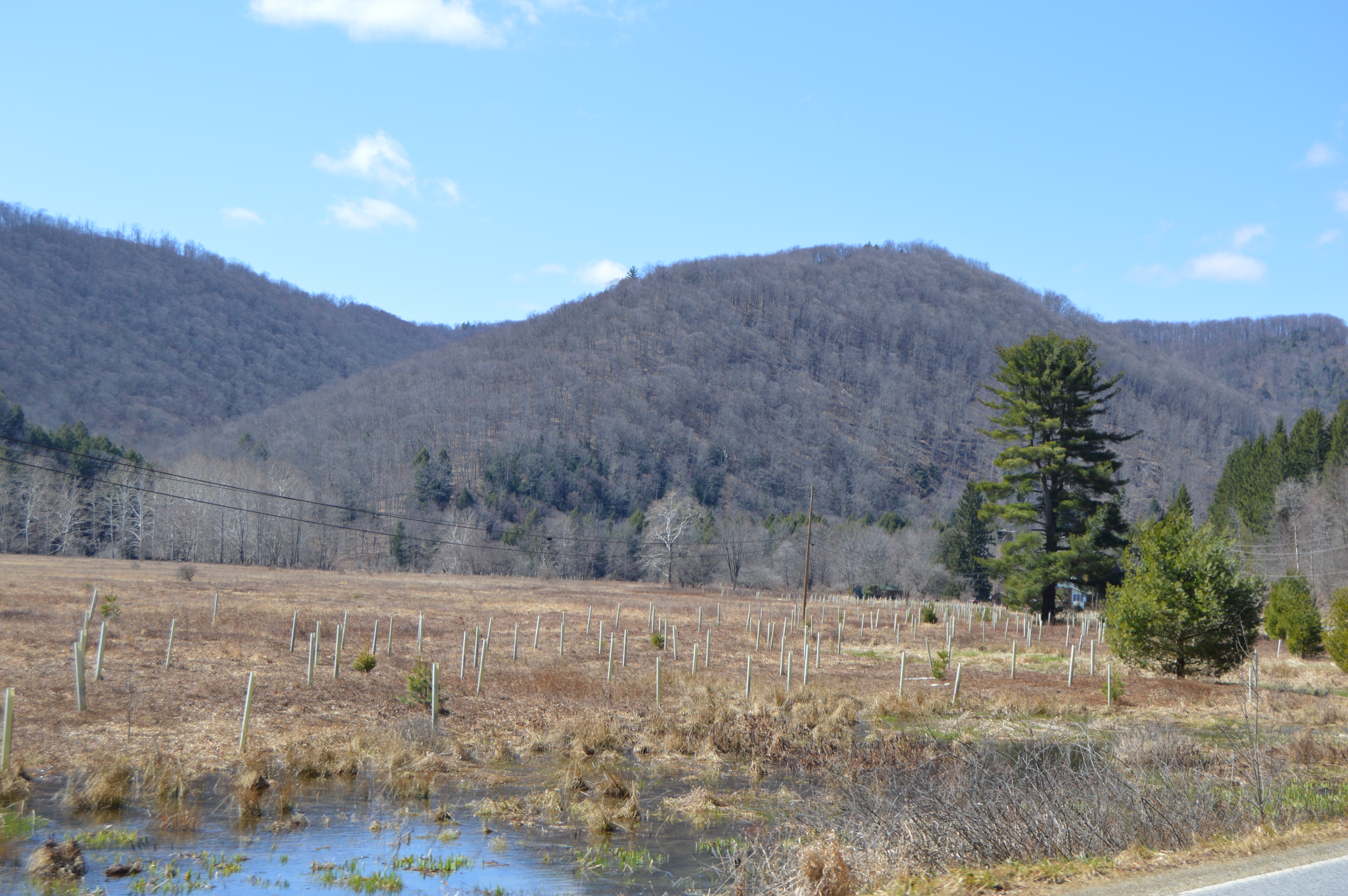
- Countryside southeast of Austin

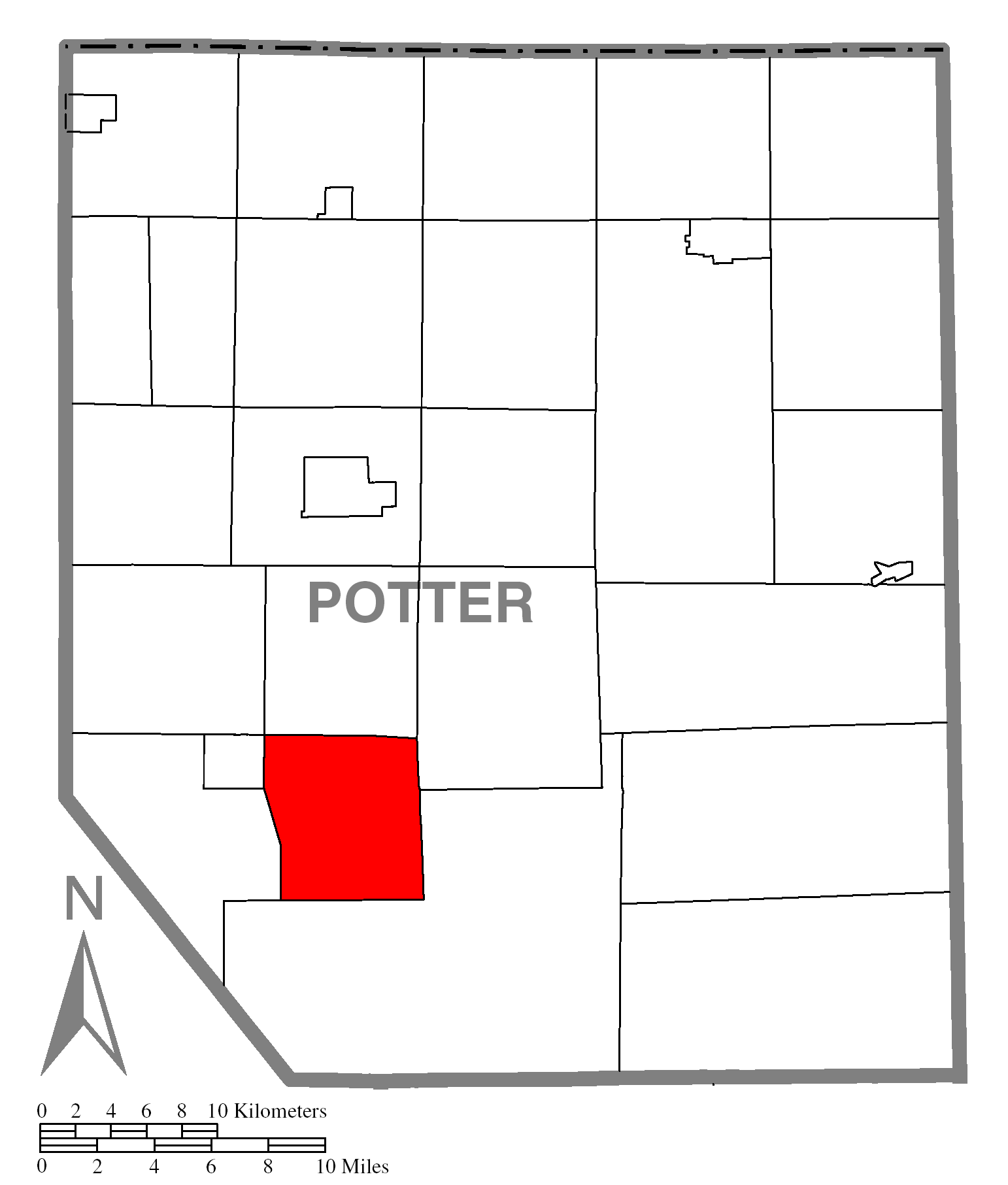
- Map of Potter County, Pennsylvania highlighting Sylvania Township

- Map of Potter County, Pennsylvania
- Country: United States
- State: Pennsylvania
- County: Potter
- Settled: 1828
- Incorporated: 1856

Government
  - Fire District: Austin Volunteer Fire Dept.

Area
  - Total: 29.68 sq mi (76.86 km^{2})
  - Land: 29.68 sq mi (76.86 km^{2})
  - Water: 0 sq mi (0.00 km^{2})

Population (2020)
  - Total: 76 ▼
  - Estimate (2021): 75
  - Density: 2.5/sq mi (0.96/km^{2})
- Time zone: UTC-5 (EST)
  - Summer (DST): UTC-4 (EDT)
- FIPS code: 42-105-75952

Sylvania Township is a township in Potter County, Pennsylvania, United States. The population was 76 at the 2020 census.

== Geography ==
According to the United States Census Bureau, the township has a total area of 29.9 square miles (77.3 km^{2}), all land.

Sylvania Township is bordered by Homer Township to the north, Summit Township to the east, Wharton Township to the east and south, Portage Township to the west and the borough of Austin to the west.

== Demographics ==
Historical population
| Census | Pop. | Note | %± |
|---|---|---|---|
| 2000 | 61 | | — |
| 2010 | 77 | | 26.2% |
| 2020 | 76 | | −1.3% |
| 2021 (est.) | 75 | | −1.3% |
U.S. Decennial Census

As of the census of 2000, there were 61 people, 29 households, and 20 families residing in the township. The population density was 2.0 people per square mile (0.8/km^{2}). There were 289 housing units at an average density of 9.7/sq mi (3.7/km^{2}). The racial makeup of the township was 93.44% White, and 6.56% from two or more races.

There were 29 households, out of which 17.2% had children under the age of 18 living with them, 58.6% were married couples living together, 6.9% had a female householder with no husband present, and 27.6% were non-families. 27.6% of all households were made up of individuals, and 6.9% had someone living alone who was 65 years of age or older. The average household size was 2.10 and the average family size was 2.48.

In the township the population was spread out, with 13.1% under the age of 18, 4.9% from 18 to 24, 24.6% from 25 to 44, 37.7% from 45 to 64, and 19.7% who were 65 years of age or older. The median age was 49 years. For every 100 females there were 96.8 males. For every 100 females age 18 and over, there were 120.8 males.

The median income for a household in the township was $39,750, and the median income for a family was $49,375. Males had a median income of $31,875 versus $26,000 for females. The per capita income for the township was $22,029. There were 5.3% of families and 6.1% of the population living below the poverty line, including no under eighteens and none of those over 64.
