= Edward Oramel Austin =

American politician (1825–1909)

- Born: December 1825; Greene, New York, U.S.
- Died: August 1, 1909 (aged 83); Austin, Pennsylvania, U.S.
- Resting place: Austin Cemetery; Austin, Pennsylvania, U.S.
- Occupation: Politician
- Known for: founding Austin, Pennsylvania
- Spouse(s): Amelia Steadman (m. 1849; died 1875) Julia Allington Wales (died 1906)
- Children: 8

Edward Oramel Austin (December 1825 – August 1, 1909) was a settler and founder of Austin, Pennsylvania.

== Biography ==
Edward Oramel Austin was born in December 1825 in Greene, New York, to Oramel Austin. He traveled to Whites Corners, Potter County, Pennsylvania in 1841 along with his parents. He stayed there until 1856, when he settled in Freeman Run, Potter County, Pennsylvania.

Austin lived in a small cabin he built which is now Main Street in Austin. In 1878 he built a larger home. There now stands a replica of Austin's home very close to where it originally stood. It houses a museum dedicated to him, the Austin Dam, the flood of 1911, and the overall history of the town. The original home was destroyed by the 1911 flood. He was a surveyor by trade. Also, he was a Justice of the Peace his entire life.

After first settling in Austin, which at the time was part of Sylvania Township, Austin built a road of 3 miles (4.8 km) from his place to Costello, formally North Wharton. Later, in 1870, he built a state road from Austin to Keating Summit, to give a railroad connection to Austin. The clearing of his tract of land in Austin ultimately led to great manufacturing interests, and industrial development. Therefore, he was able to bring in the business of Mr. Garretson. He also helped convince Goodyear Lumber Company to bring its Mammoth plant to Austin in 1885. The borough of Austin was named after him and it was officially incorporated in October 1888. He actually owned the 147 acres on which the town was built. Because of his skills as a civil engineer and land surveyor he was able to draw plans to lay out the town as he saw fit. He surveyed parts of Potter County and incorporated the borough of Austin on October 19, 1888.

From 1847 to 1849, Austin spent time studying law, although he had no intention of practicing. He also did some writing about Potter County which was incorporated in Egle's History of Pennsylvania. He became justice of the peace in 1857 and served in the role until his death. He was a school director for 40 years. Austin was elected county commissioner in 1863 and served two terms. He was a member of the Union Army during the Civil War, serving from late 1862 until July 1865. He was chief clerk in the Palmico department. He was a member of the Masons at the level of Master Mason. He was a charter member of the Arcana Lodge.

== Family ==
He was first married on March 15, 1849, to Amelia Steadman. Together they had five children. Following the death of his wife in March 1875 he married Julia Allington Wales. Together they had three children. She died May 3, 1906, at the family home in Austin.

Austin died on August 1, 1909, at his home in Austin. He was buried in Austin Cemetery.
