= Sweden Valley, Pennsylvania =

Unincorporated community in Pennsylvania, US

- Census-designated place
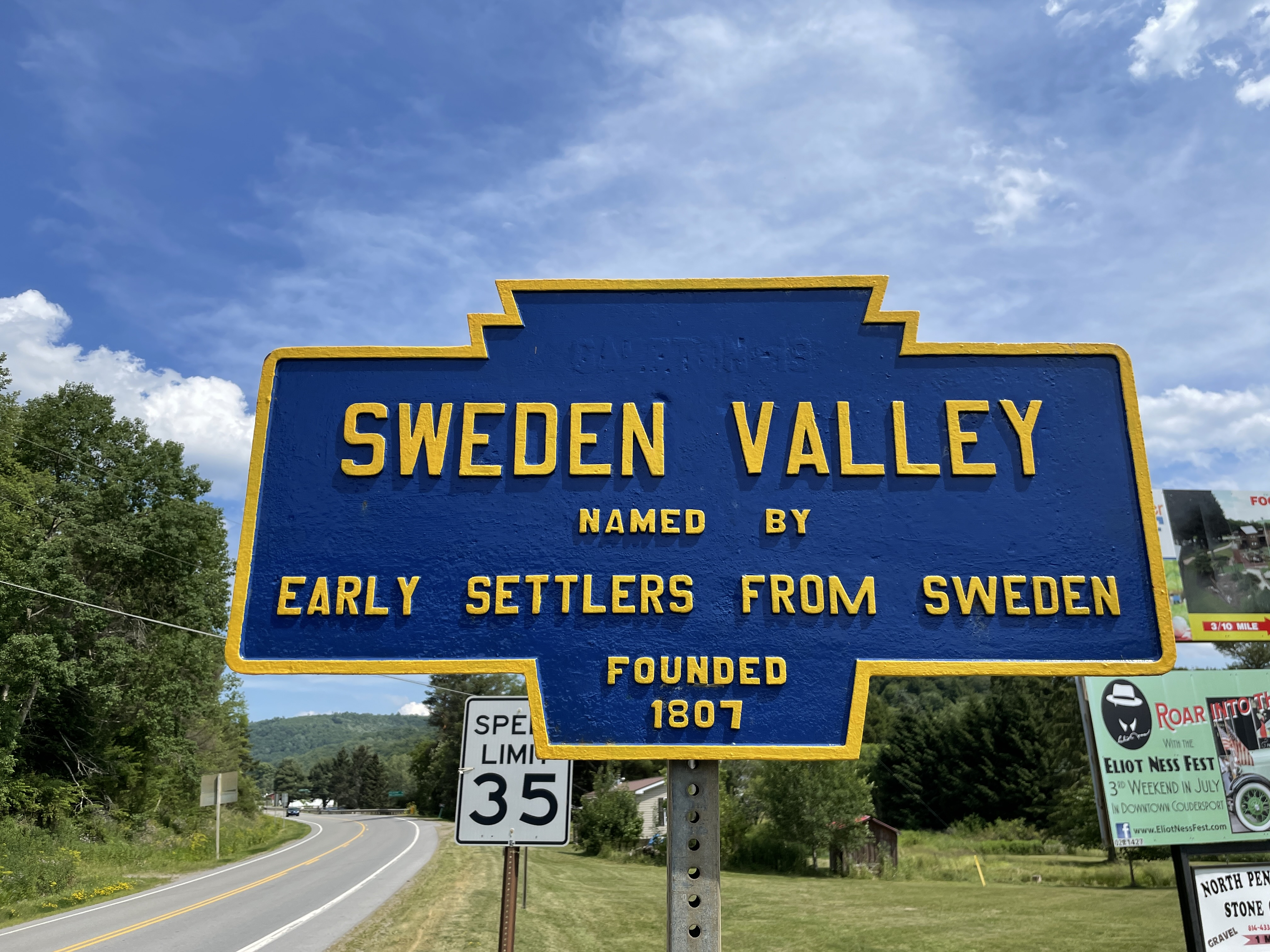
- Keystone Marker

- Location within Pennsylvania Location within the United States
- Coordinates: 41°45′21″N 77°57′02″W
- Country: United States
- State: Pennsylvania
- County: Potter
- Elevation: 1,946 ft (593 m)

Population (2010)
  - Total: 223
- Time zone: UTC-5 (Eastern (EST))
  - Summer (DST): UTC-4 (EDT)
- GNIS feature ID: 2630042

Sweden Valley is a census-designated place located in Sweden Township in central Potter County in the state of Pennsylvania, United States. It is located along the famous U.S. Route 6, a few miles east of Coudersport. As of the 2010 census the population was 223 residents.
