= Coudersport Ice Mine =

Cave in Pennsylvania, US

Coordinates: 41°45′15″N 77°57′19″W

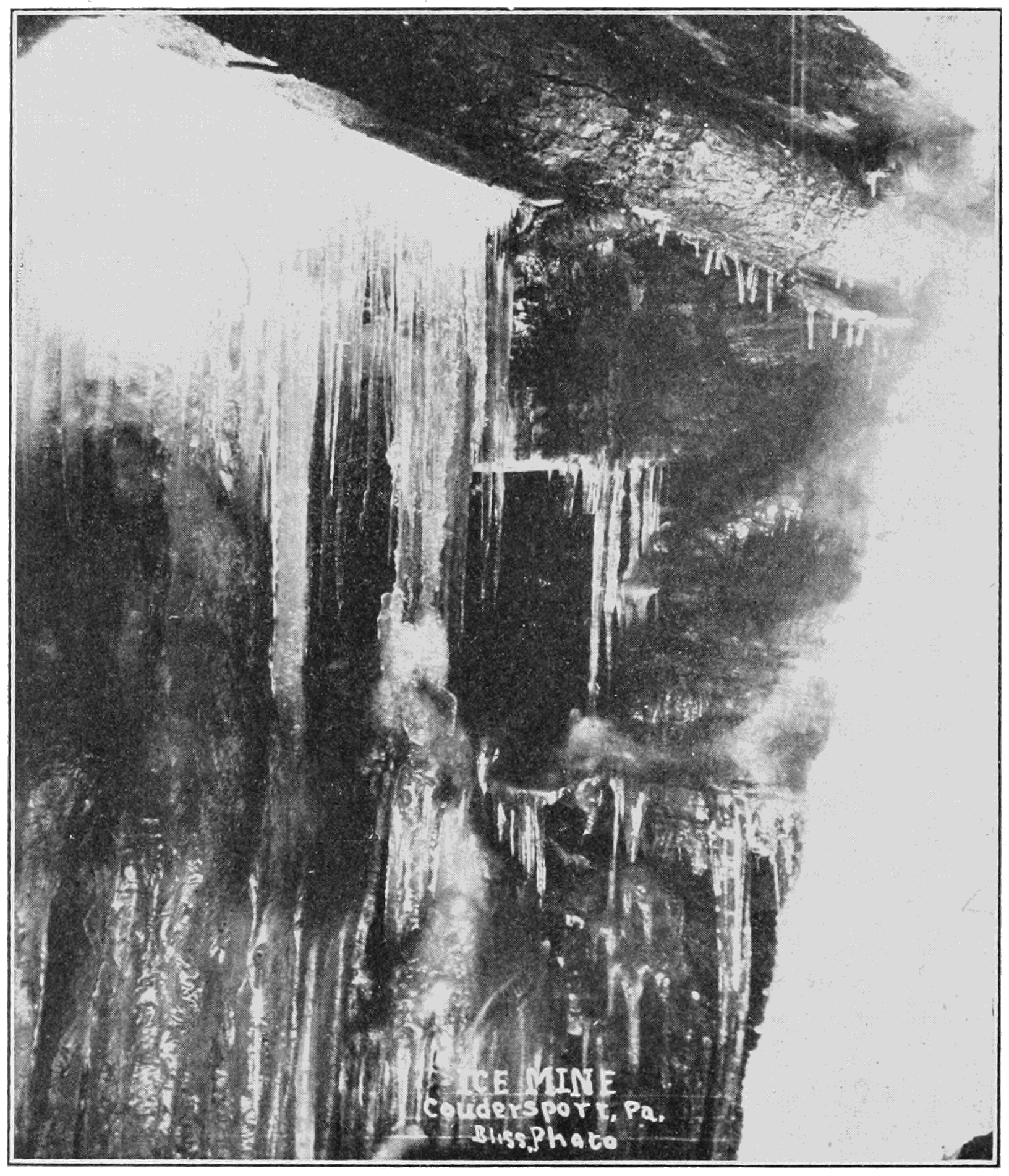
Inside the ice mine

The Coudersport Ice Mine is an ice cave located in Sweden Township, Pennsylvania, (east of Coudersport) where ice formations appear in the shaft during the spring of the year, continue through the hot weather, and disappear in winter. Ice appears in various shapes and forms, often as huge icicles measuring from 1 to 3 feet (0.91 m) in thickness, and from 15 to 25 feet (7.6 m) in length; the ice is generally clear and sparkling.

A theory about the origin of this mine states that during the winter, cold air over the hilltop sinks into rock openings in the Lock Haven Formation (Devonian age) and slowly expels the warm air that had penetrated these openings during the preceding summer. Ordinarily this process takes place locally, but here the interconnection of the rock crevices tends to be so arranged that the air circulation over a wide region is focused on one spot. Thus, from April or May to September, cold air comes in contact with percolating groundwater, forming ice during the hot months of the year; from September to late spring, warm air trapped in the rocks from the preceding summer escapes and melts the ice.

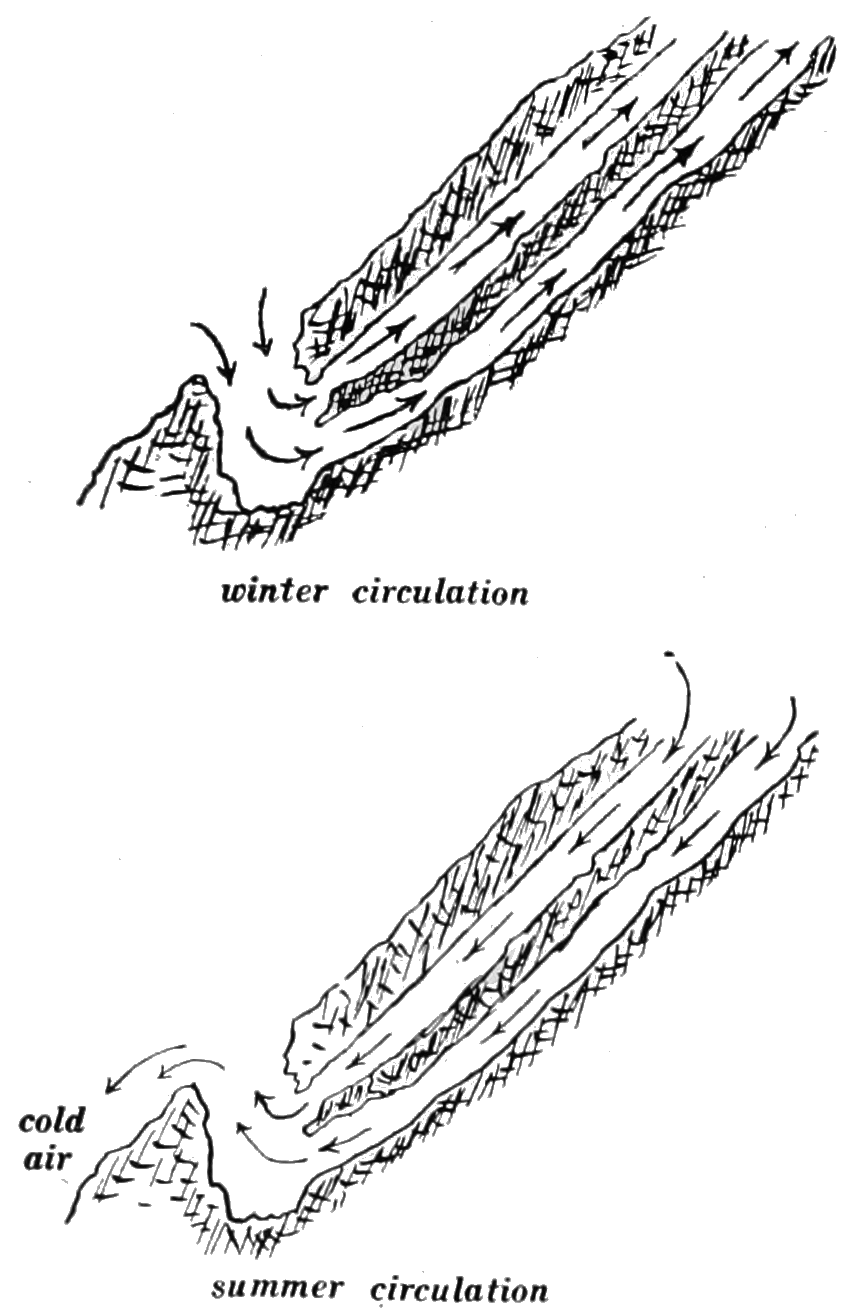
Air circulation

Discovered in 1894, the cave is about 40 feet (12 m) deep, about 8 feet (2.4 m) wide, and 10 feet (3.0 m) long. The cave was open to the public for many decades but closed in 1990.

The ice mine property was purchased by new owners who began a restoration in 2013. After being closed for nearly a quarter of a century, the Coudersport Ice Mine was re-opened in 2014.

== See also ==
- Nagabashiri Wind Caves
