= Sweden Township, Pennsylvania =

Township in Pennsylvania, US

Coordinates: 41°44′30″N 77°51′59″W

- Township
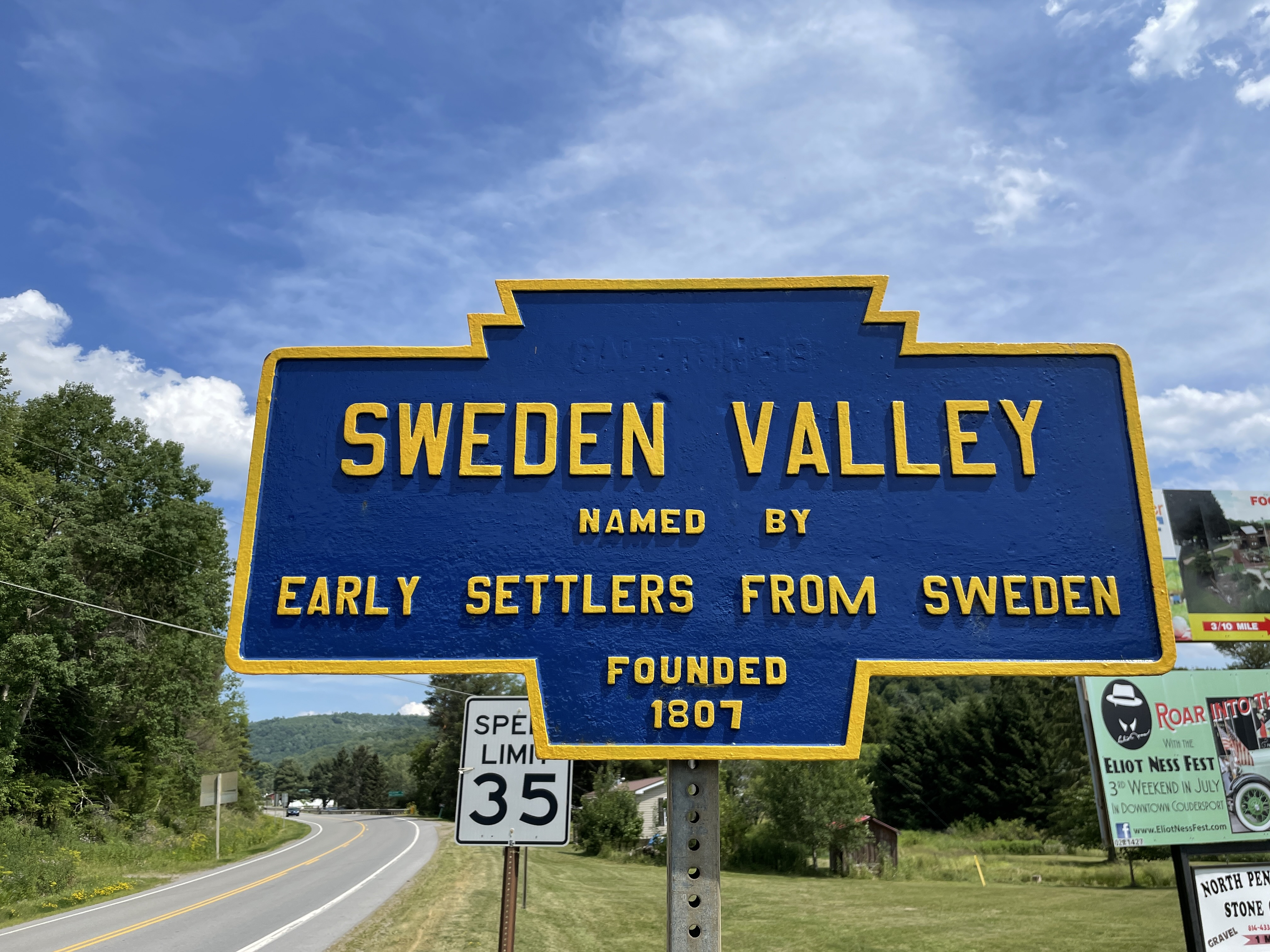
- Keystone marker in Sweden Valley, a community within the township

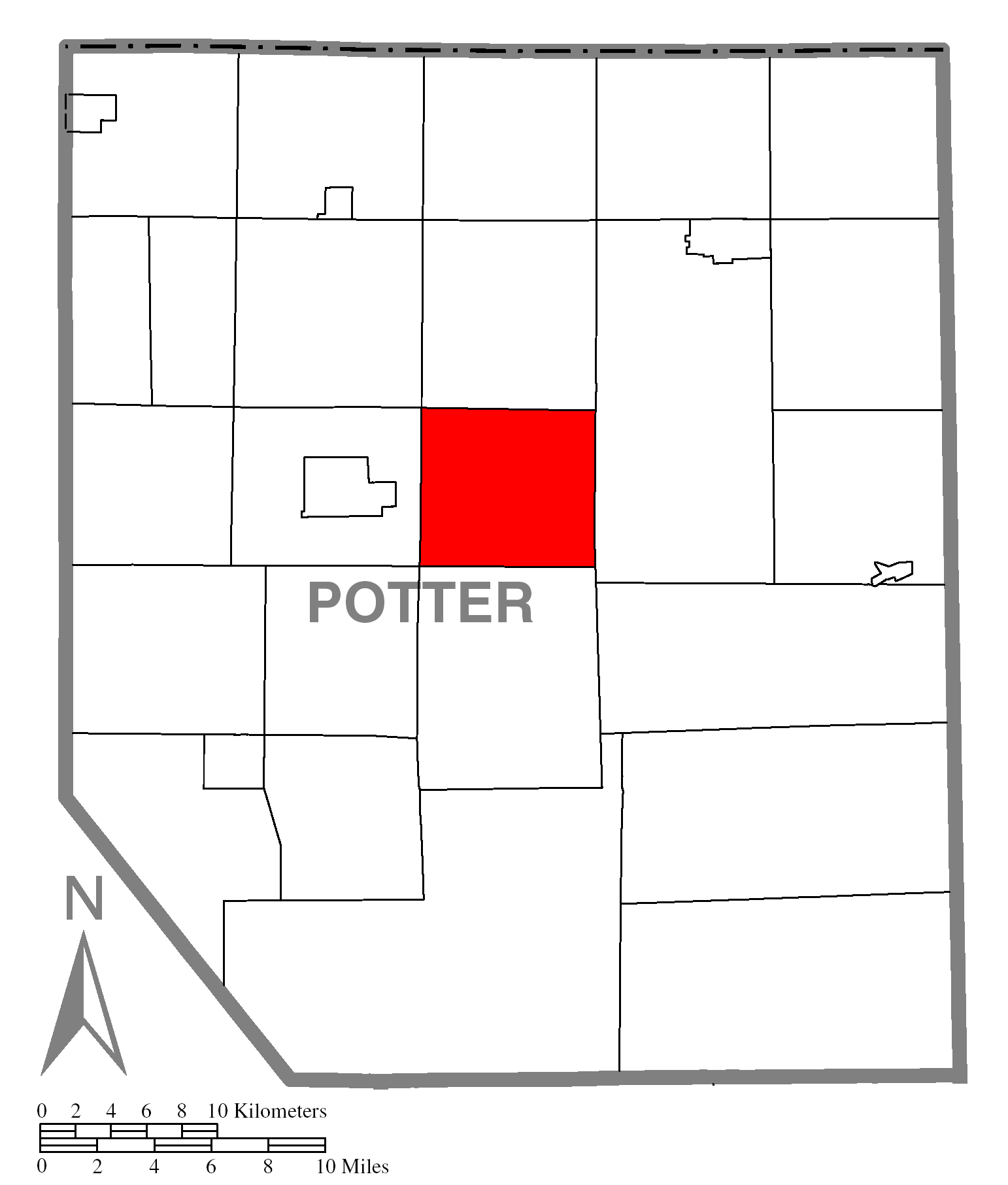
- Map of Potter County, Pennsylvania highlighting Sweden Township

- Map of Potter County, Pennsylvania
- Country: United States
- State: Pennsylvania
- County: Potter
- Settled: 1808
- Incorporated: 1828

Area
  - Total: 33.83 sq mi (87.63 km^{2})
  - Land: 33.82 sq mi (87.60 km^{2})
  - Water: 0.015 sq mi (0.04 km^{2})

Population (2020)
  - Total: 871 ▼
  - Estimate (2021): 863
  - Density: 25.0/sq mi (9.65/km^{2})
- Time zone: UTC-5 (EST)
  - Summer (DST): UTC-4 (EDT)
- FIPS code: 42-105-75720

Sweden Township is a township in Potter County, Pennsylvania, United States. The population was 871 at the 2020 census.

== History ==
Sweden Township was formed on February 26, 1828, from Eulalia Township. It was named for the nation of Sweden, the native country of its early pioneer settlers.

In 2023, the township voted 2–1 to abolish its police force after the township's police chief, Bryan Phelps, resigned to become a county judge, citing low crime and a lack of space in the budget to support an independent police force. As such, the Pennsylvania State Police holds jurisdiction over the township.

=== Coudersport Area Municipal Authority Treatment Plant Controversy ===
The Coudersport Area Municipal Authority (CAMA) became involved in a controversial proposal for a fracking wastewater plant in early 2018. CAMA services Sweden Township. JKLM Energy intends to truck "produced water" (fracking wastewater) to a centralized plant for treatment to be located adjacent to the CAMA plant in Eulalia Township, Pennsylvania, when and if the plant is approved and licensed by governmental authorities. The treated wastewater then will be transferred to CAMA for disposal into the headwaters of the Allegheny River.

The plant proposal is opposed by many residents Potter County as well as by the Seneca Nation of Indians who reside downriver from the proposed plant location. The Pennsylvania Department of Environmental Protection fined JKLM $472,317 in 2016 for groundwater contamination caused by the use of an unapproved surfactant during the drilling of a natural gas well. The contamination impacted six private drinking water wells in Sweden and Eulalia townships, Potter County. The Cattaugus County, New York, legislature as well as New York State Senator Catharine Young have joined the Seneca Nation in opposition to the proposed fracking wastewater plant. Additionally, the Coudersport Bourough (PA) Council voted to oppose the siting of the plant near Coudersport. The Coudersport Borough Council's resolution of opposition was forwarded to the Coudersport Area Municipal Authority (CAMA), who has not yet considered it in a public forum.

== Geography ==
According to the United States Census Bureau, the township has a total area of 33.7 square miles (87.4 km^{2}), of which 33.7 square miles (87.3 km^{2}) is land and 0.03% is water. It contains the census-designated place of Sweden Valley.

Sweden Township is bordered by Allegany Township to the north, Ulysses Township to the east, Summit Township to the south and Eulalia Township to the west. The Coudersport Ice Mine is located in Sweden Township.

== Demographics ==
Historical population
Census	Pop.	Note	%±
2000	775		—
2010	872		12.5%
2020	871		−0.1%
2021 (est.)	863		−0.9%
U.S. Decennial Census

As of the census of 2000, there were 775 people, 299 households, and 232 families residing in the township. The population density was 23.0 people per square mile (8.9/km^{2}). There were 575 housing units at an average density of 17.1/sq mi (6.6/km^{2}). The racial makeup of the township was 96.90% White, 0.52% Native American, 0.90% Asian, 0.26% Pacific Islander, 0.65% from other races, and 0.77% from two or more races. Hispanic or Latino of any race were 1.16% of the population.

There were 299 households, out of which 30.4% had children under the age of 18 living with them, 65.9% were married couples living together, 7.4% had a female householder with no husband present, and 22.4% were non-families. 18.7% of all households were made up of individuals, and 6.4% had someone living alone who was 65 years of age or older. The average household size was 2.59 and the average family size was 2.94.

In the township the population was spread out, with 25.3% under the age of 18, 7.0% from 18 to 24, 27.1% from 25 to 44, 26.7% from 45 to 64, and 13.9% who were 65 years of age or older. The median age was 38 years. For every 100 females, there were 114.7 males. For every 100 females age 18 and over, there were 112.9 males.

The median income for a household in the township was $42,750, and the median income for a family was $47,188. Males had a median income of $35,568 versus $25,208 for females. The per capita income for the township was $18,780. About 6.0% of families and 7.6% of the population were below the poverty line, including 13.6% of those under age 18 and 5.8% of those age 65 or over.
