= Summit Township, Potter County, Pennsylvania =

Township in Pennsylvania, US

Coordinates: 41°37′29″N 77°54′59″W

- Township
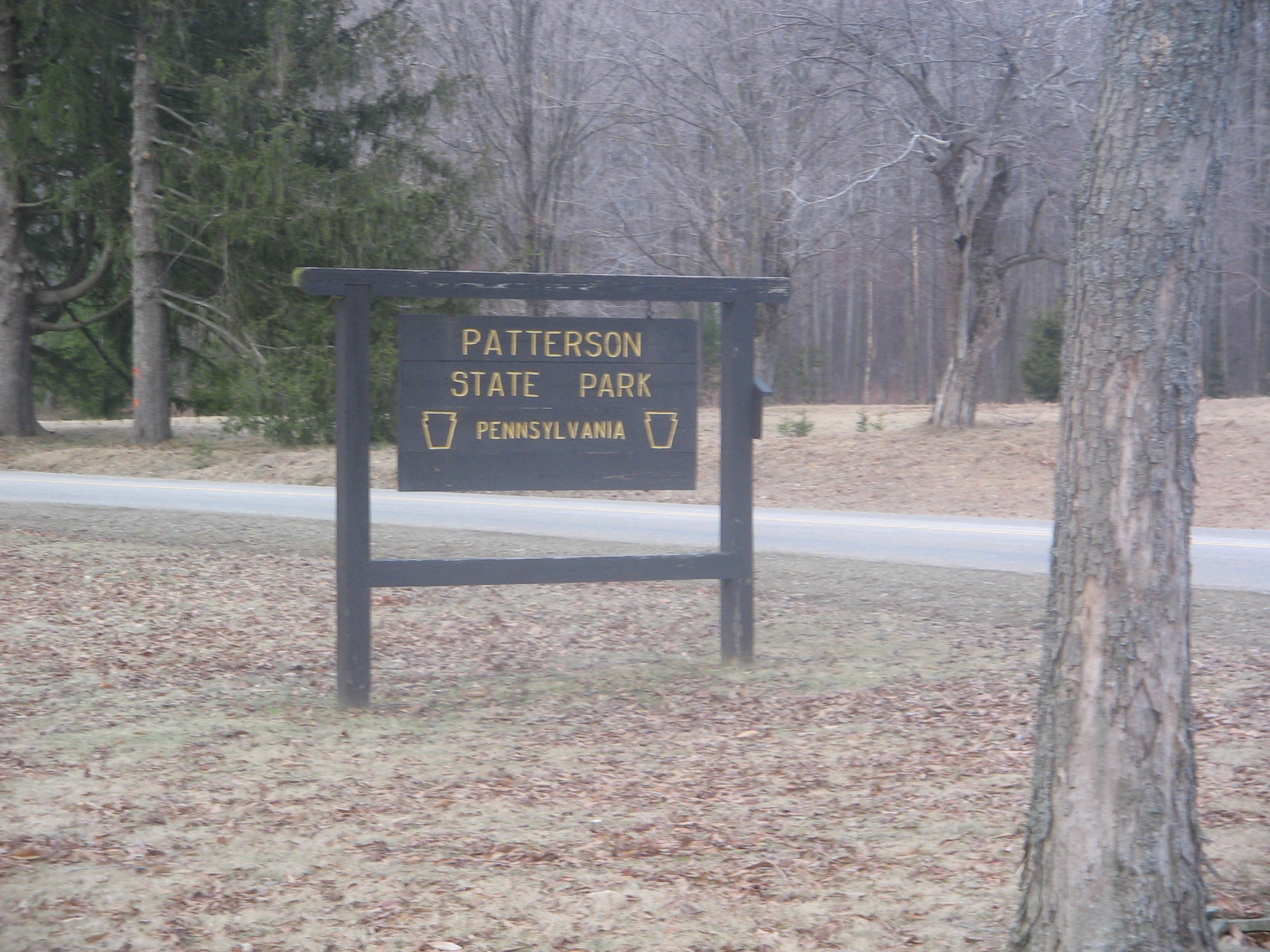
- Patterson State Park

- Logo

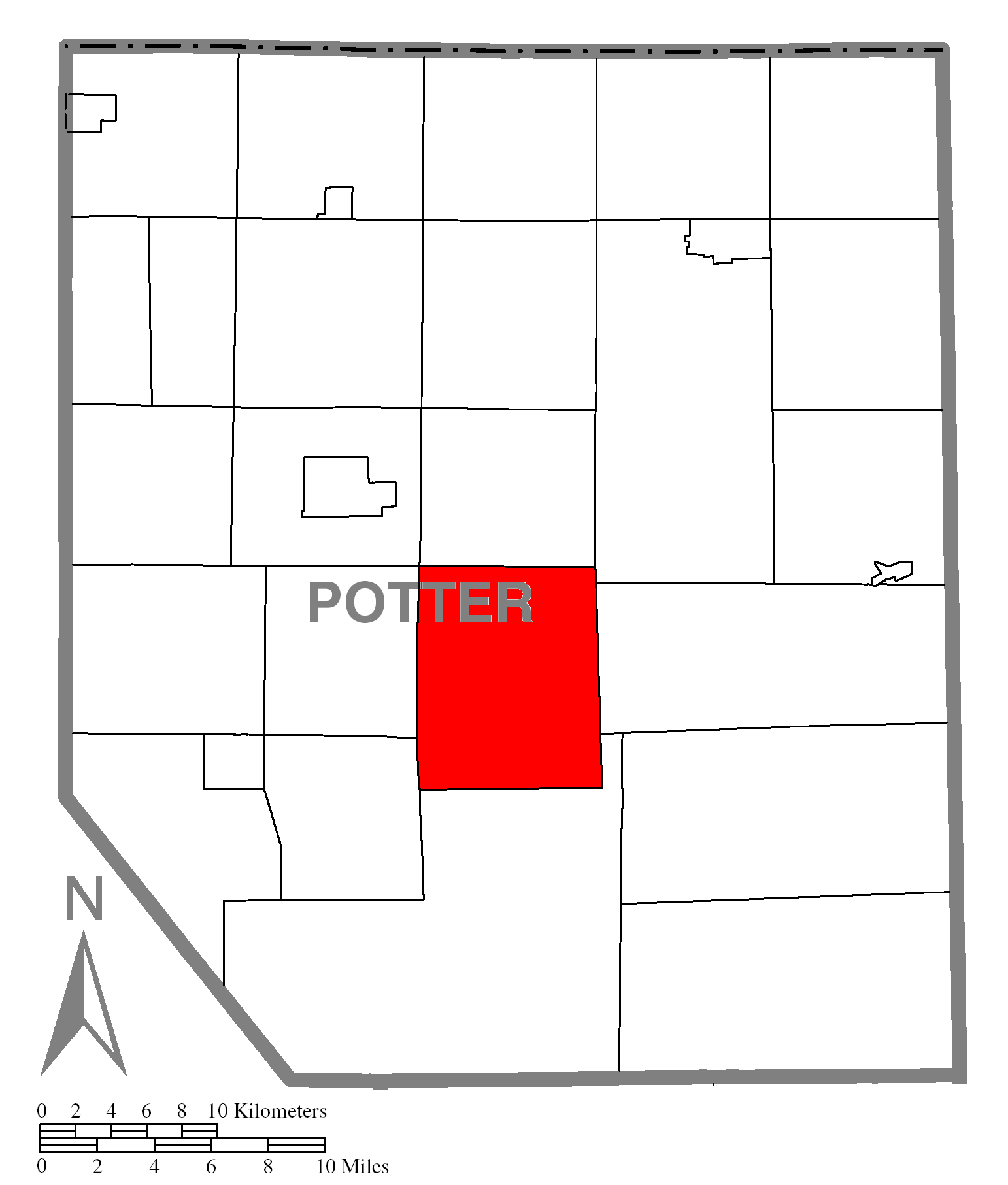
- Map of Potter County, Pennsylvania highlighting Summit Township

- Map of Potter County, Pennsylvania
- Country: United States
- State: Pennsylvania
- County: Potter
- Incorporated: 1853

Government
  - Fire District: (N) Coudersport (S) Austin Volunteer Fire Dept.

Area
  - Total: 49.23 sq mi (127.51 km^{2})
  - Land: 49.23 sq mi (127.51 km^{2})
  - Water: 0 sq mi (0.00 km^{2})

Population (2020)
  - Total: 134 ▼
  - Estimate (2021): 134
  - Density: 3.7/sq mi (1.43/km^{2})
- Time zone: UTC-5 (EST)
  - Summer (DST): UTC-4 (EDT)
- FIPS code: 42-105-75224
- Website: summittownshipsupervisors.com/township-information/

Summit Township is a township in Potter County, Pennsylvania, United States. The population was 134 at the 2020 census. Two of the smallest Pennsylvania state parks, Prouty Place State Park and Patterson State Park are in Summit Township.

== Geography ==
According to the United States Census Bureau, the township has a total area of 49.4 square miles (127.9 km^{2}), all land.

Summit Township is bordered by Sweden Township to the north, Ulysses and West Branch Townships to the east, Wharton Township to the east and south, and Sylvania and Homer Townships to the west.

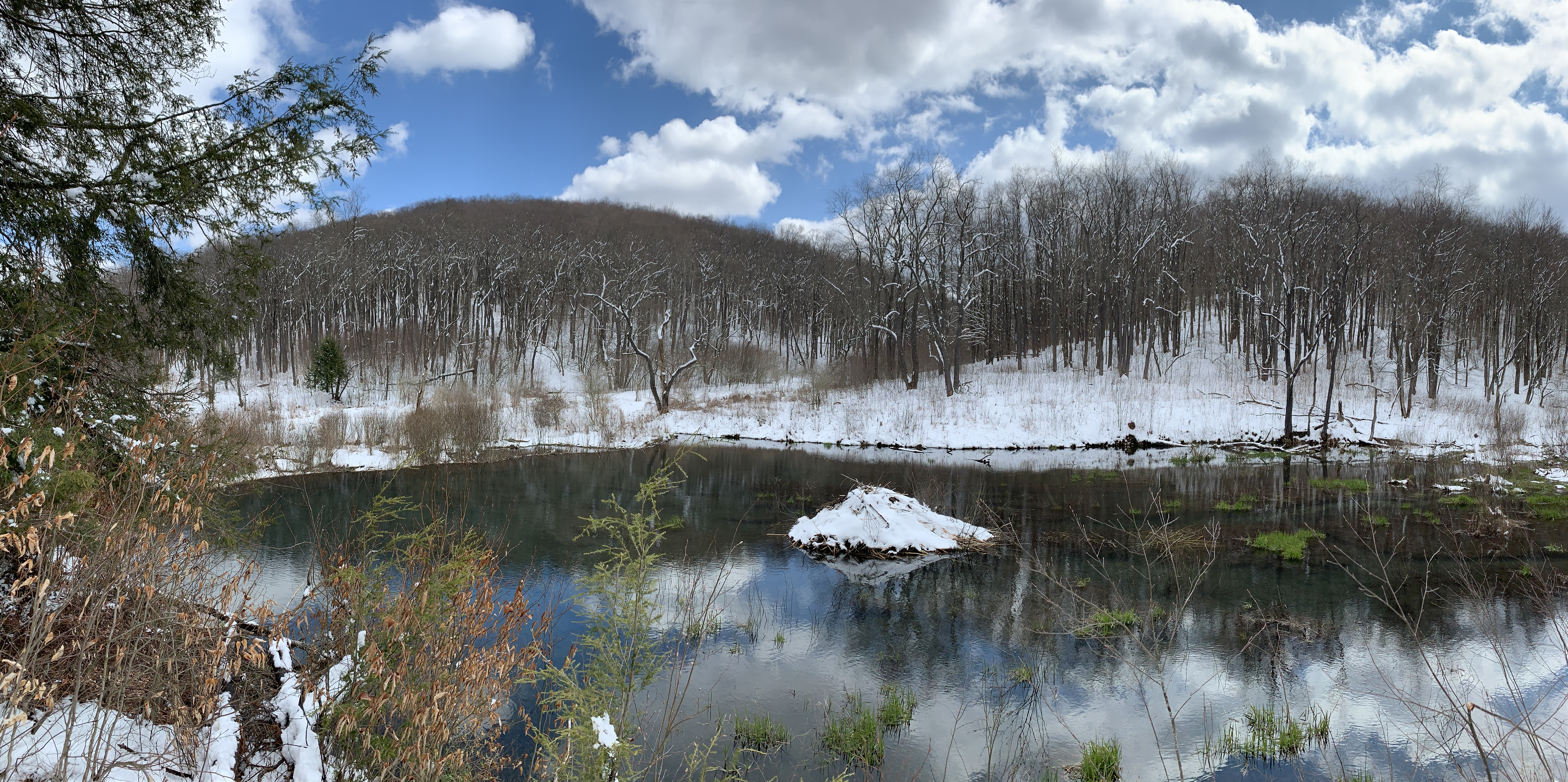
A beaver lodge in Summit Township, Potter County, Pennsylvania

== Demographics ==
Historical population
Census	Pop.	Note	%±
2000	112		—
2010	188		67.9%
2020	134		−28.7%
2021 (est.)	134		0.0%
U.S. Decennial Census

As of the census of 2000, there were 112 people, 45 households, and 36 families residing in the township. The population density was 2.3 people per square mile (0.9/km^{2}). There were 203 housing units at an average density of 4.1/sq mi (1.6/km^{2}). The racial makeup of the township was 99.11% White and 0.89% Native American. Hispanic or Latino of any race were 0.89% of the population.

There were 45 households, out of which 20.0% had children under the age of 18 living with them, 71.1% were married couples living together, 4.4% had a female householder with no husband present, and 20.0% were non-families. 17.8% of all households were made up of individuals, and 6.7% had someone living alone who was 65 years of age or older. The average household size was 2.49 and the average family size was 2.81.

In the township the population was spread out, with 19.6% under the age of 18, 6.3% from 18 to 24, 22.3% from 25 to 44, 39.3% from 45 to 64, and 12.5% who were 65 years of age or older. The median age was 46 years. For every 100 females, there were 119.6 males. For every 100 females age 18 and over, there were 104.5 males.

The median income for a household in the township was $43,750, and the median income for a family was $57,750. Males had a median income of $54,167 versus $14,688 for females. The per capita income for the township was $18,628. There were 13.5% of families and 20.9% of the population living below the poverty line, including 61.9% of under eighteens and 9.5% of those over 64.
