= Homer Township, Potter County, Pennsylvania =

Township in Pennsylvania, US

Coordinates: 41°40′00″N 78°01′59″W

Homer Township, Pennsylvania
- Township
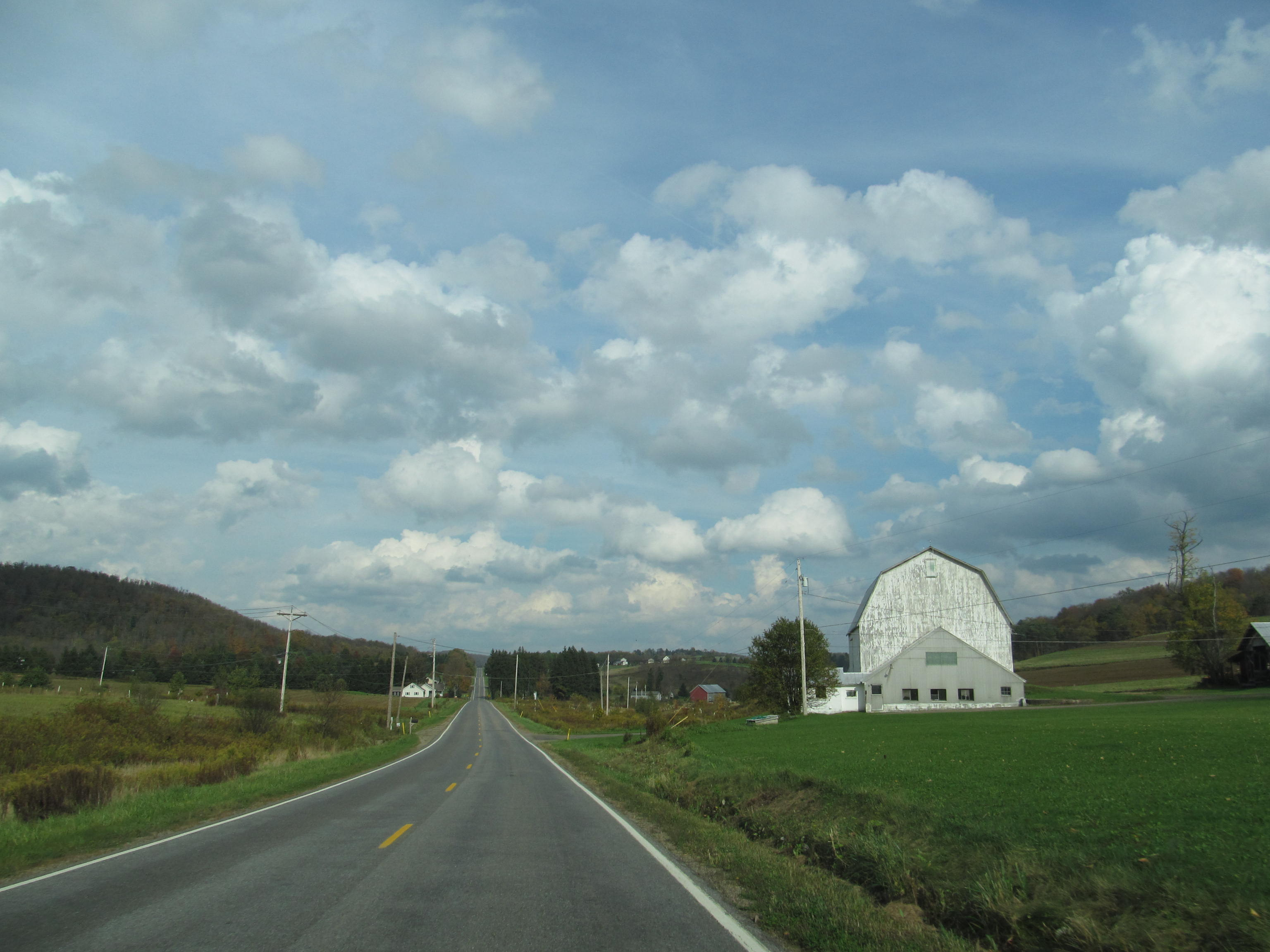
- Farm along northbound PA 872 in Homer Township

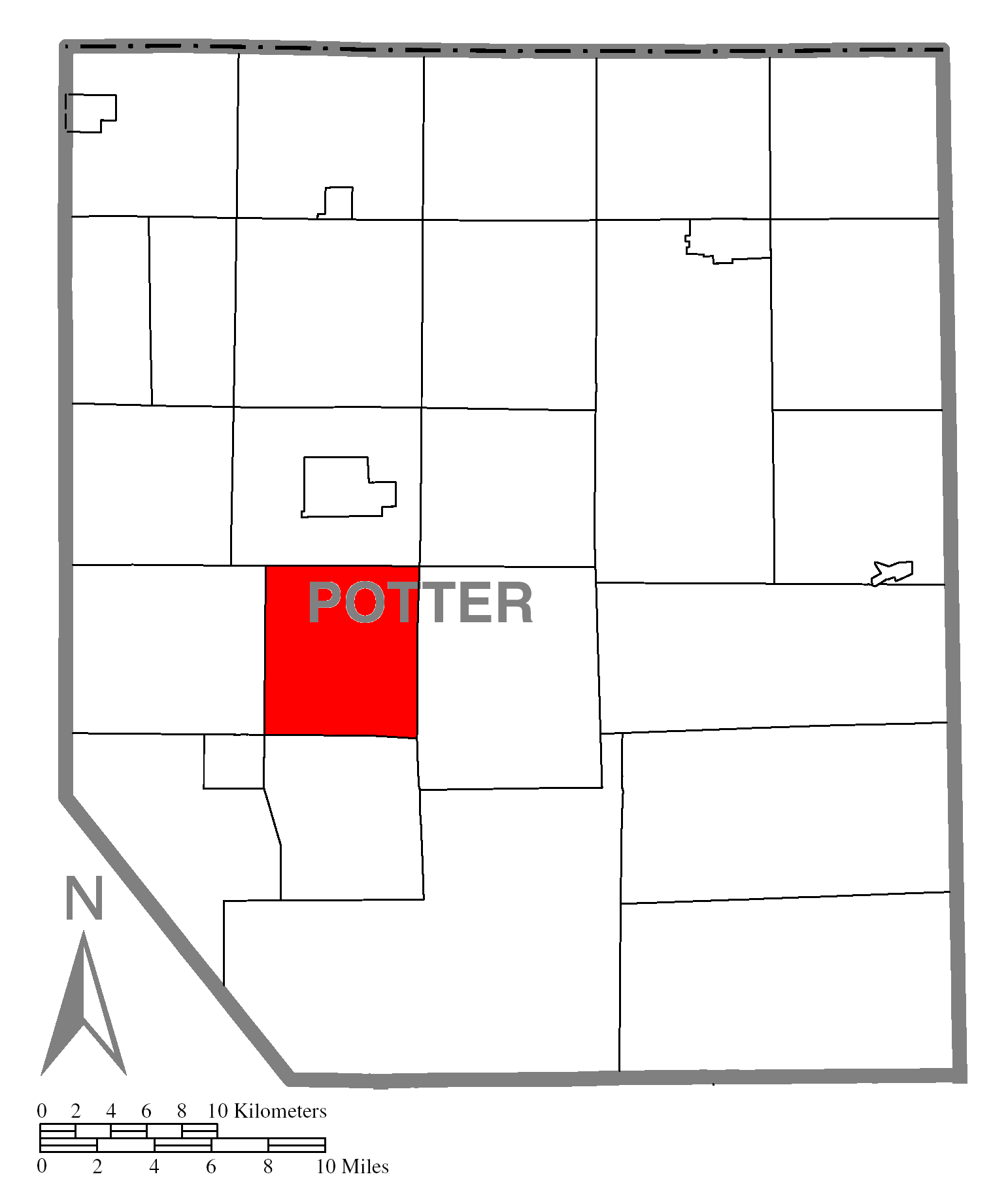
- Map of Potter County, Pennsylvania highlighting Homer Township

- Map of Potter County, Pennsylvania
- Country: United States
- State: Pennsylvania
- County: Potter
- Settled: 1838
- Incorporated: 1853

Area
  - Total: 32.00 sq mi (82.87 km^{2})
  - Land: 32.00 sq mi (82.87 km^{2})
  - Water: 0 sq mi (0.00 km^{2})

Population (2020)
  - Total: 438 ▲
  - Estimate (2021): 434
  - Density: 13/sq mi (5/km^{2})
- Time zone: UTC-5 (EST)
  - Summer (DST): UTC-4 (EDT)
- FIPS code: 42-105-35400
- Website: homertwp.com

Homer Township is a township in Potter County, Pennsylvania, United States. The population was 438 at the 2020 census.

== Geography ==
According to the United States Census Bureau, the township has a total area of 31.9 square miles (83 km^{2}), all land.

Homer Township is bordered by Eulalia Township to the north, Summit Township to the east, Sylvania Township to the south and Keating Township to the west.

== Demographics ==
Historical population
Census	Pop.	Note	%±
2000	390		—
2010	437		12.1%
2020	438		0.2%
2021 (est.)	434		−0.9%
U.S. Decennial Census

As of the census of 2000, there were 390 people, 142 households, and 104 families residing in the township. The population density was 12.2 people per square mile (4.7/km^{2}). There were 242 housing units at an average density of 7.6/sq mi (2.9/km^{2}). The racial makeup of the township was 97.18% White, 0.51% African American, 1.28% Asian, and 1.03% from two or more races. Hispanic or Latino of any race were 0.26% of the population.

There were 142 households, out of which 46.5% had children under the age of 18 living with them, 67.6% were married couples living together, 2.8% had a female householder with no husband present, and 26.1% were non-families. 23.2% of all households were made up of individuals, and 8.5% had someone living alone who was 65 years of age or older. The average household size was 2.75 and the average family size was 3.30.

In the township the population was spread out, with 31.5% under the age of 18, 5.4% from 18 to 24, 34.1% from 25 to 44, 22.3% from 45 to 64, and 6.7% who were 65 years of age or older. The median age was 36 years. For every 100 females, there were 101.0 males. For every 100 females age 18 and over, there were 103.8 males.

The median income for a household in the township was $50,179, and the median income for a family was $54,063. Males had a median income of $36,875 versus $22,500 for females. The per capita income for the township was $19,625. None of the families and 1.7% of the population were living below the poverty line, including no under eighteens and 11.4% of those over 64.
