= Wharton Township, Potter County, Pennsylvania =

Township in Pennsylvania, US

Coordinates: 41°32′00″N 77°58′59″W

- Township
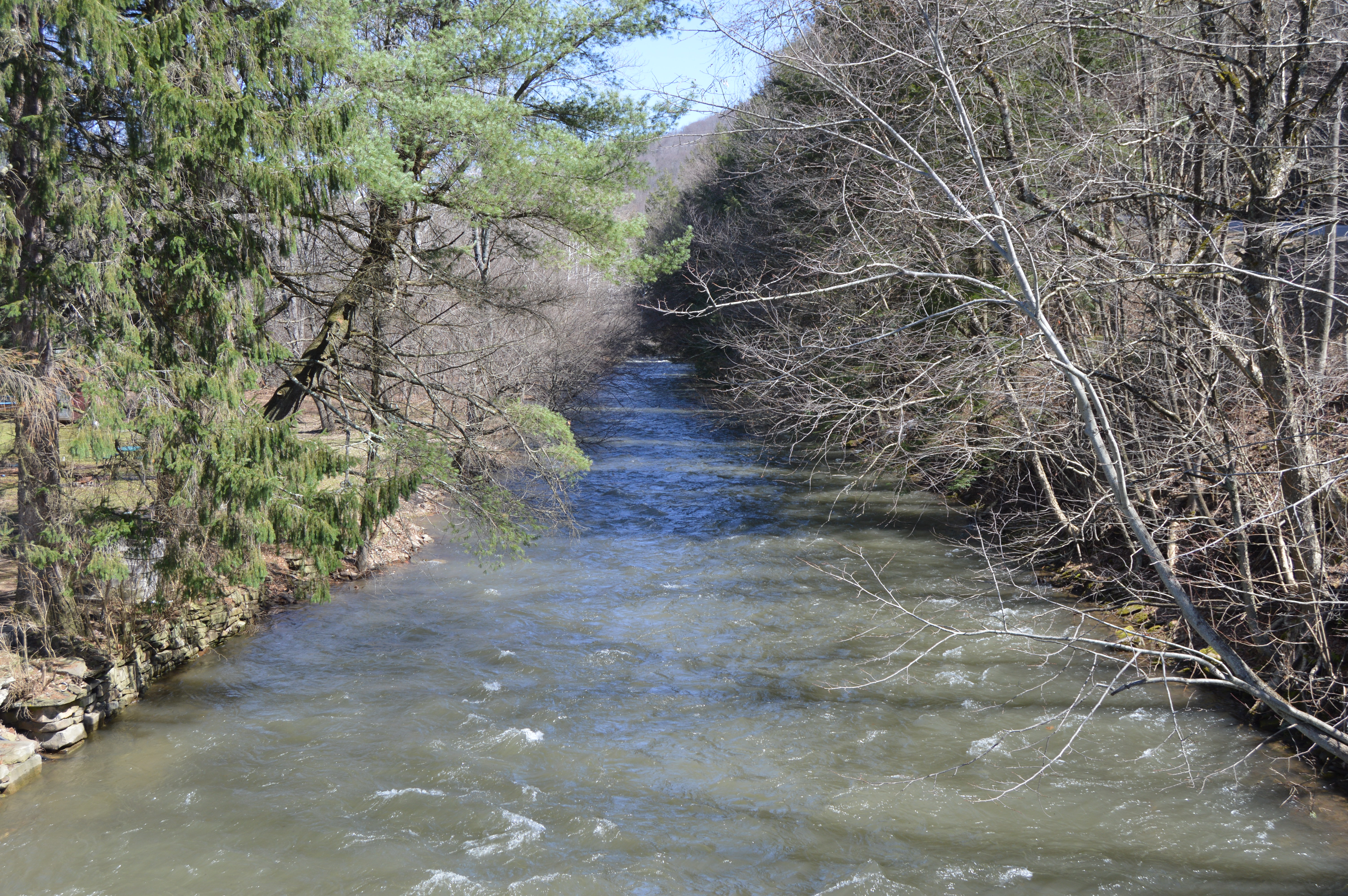
- East Fork of Sinnemahoning Creek at Wharton

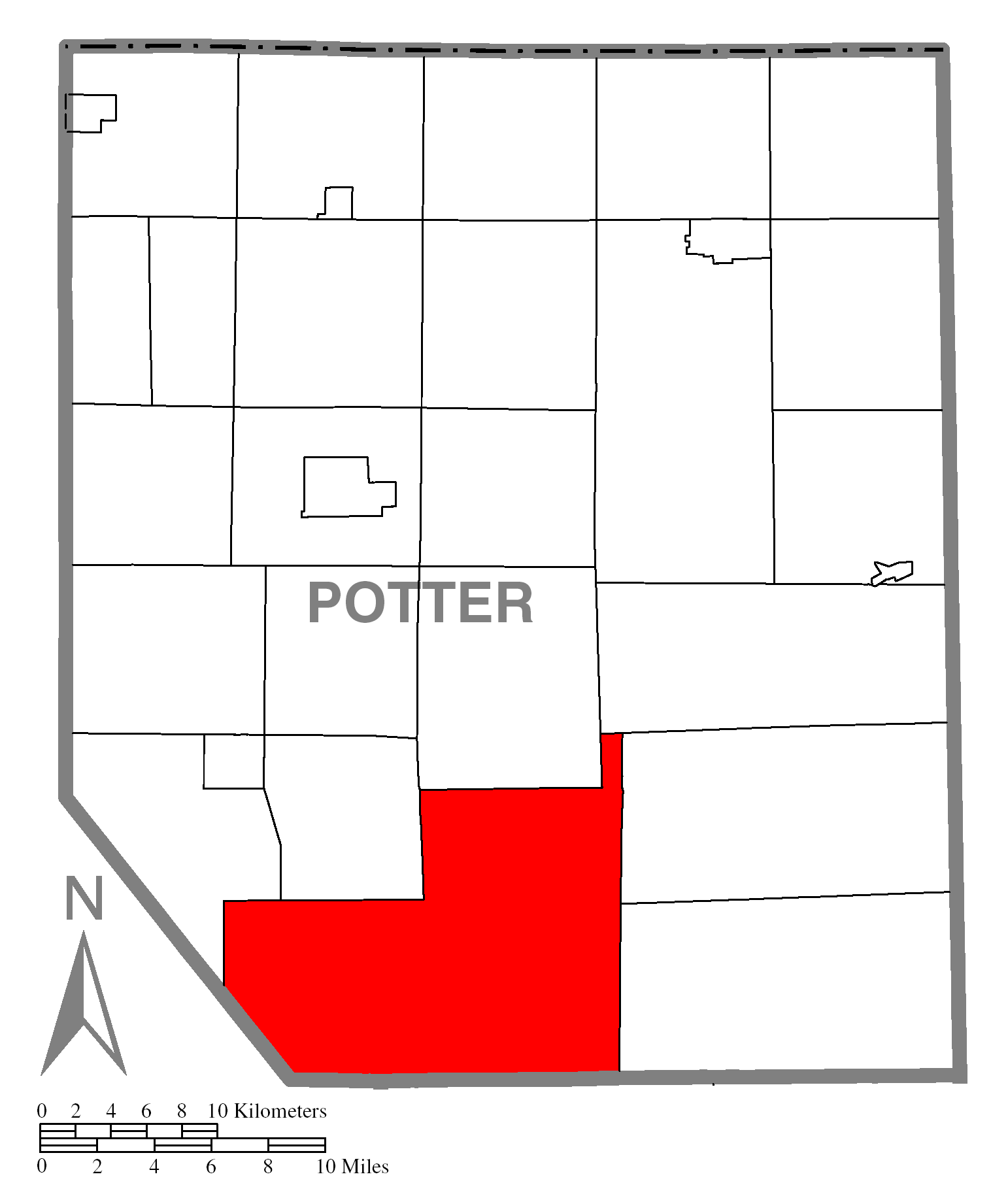
- Map of Potter County, Pennsylvania highlighting Wharton Township

- Map of Potter County, Pennsylvania
- Country: United States
- State: Pennsylvania
- County: Potter
- Settled: 1816
- Incorporated: 1826

Government
  - Fire District: Austin Volunteer Fire Dept.

Area
  - Total: 113.25 sq mi (293.32 km^{2})
  - Land: 113.25 sq mi (293.31 km^{2})
  - Water: 0.0039 sq mi (0.01 km^{2})

Population (2020)
  - Total: 119 ▲
  - Estimate (2021): 118
  - Density: 0.83/sq mi (0.32/km^{2})
- Time zone: UTC-5 (EST)
  - Summer (DST): UTC-4 (EDT)
- FIPS code: 42-105-84360

Wharton Township is a township in Potter County, Pennsylvania, United States. The population was 119 at the 2020 census.

== Geography ==
In 2000, according to the United States Census Bureau, the township had a total area of 113.25 sq mi (293.32 km^{2}), all land. It has expanded since that time: on January 1, 2004, the adjacent East Fork Road District, located east of Wharton Township, was annexed to Wharton Township.

Wharton Township is bordered by Summit Township to the north, Abbott and Stewardson Townships to the east, Clinton County to the south, Cameron County, Portage Township to the west and north and Sylvania Township to the north and west.

== Demographics ==
Historical population
Census	Pop.	Note	%±
2000	91		—
2010	99		8.8%
2020	119		20.2%
2021 (est.)	118		−0.8%
U.S. Decennial Census

As of the census of 2000, there were 91 people, 41 households, and 28 families residing in the township. The population density was 1.5 people per square mile (0.6/km^{2}). There were 484 housing units at an average density of 7.8/sq mi (3.0/km^{2}). The racial makeup of the township was 95.60% white, 1.10% Native American, and 3.30% from two or more races.

There were 44 households, out of which 22.0% had children under the age of 18 living with them, 61.0% were married couples living together, 7.3% had a female householder with no husband present, and 29.3% were non-families. 26.8% of all households were made up of individuals, and 19.5% had someone living alone who was 65 years of age or older. The average household size was 2.22 and the average family size was 2.62.

In the township the population was spread out, with 19.8% under the age of 18, 4.4% from 18 to 24, 16.5% from 25 to 44, 37.4% from 45 to 64, and 22.0% who were 65 years of age or older. The median age was 52 years. For every 100 females there were 97.8 males. For every 100 females age 18 and over, there were 97.3 males.

The median income for a household in the township was $38,125, and the median income for a family was $41,250. Males had a median income of $30,833 versus $16,250 for females. The per capita income for the township was $17,268. There were 11.4% of families and 9.2% of the population living below the poverty line, including 13.8% of under eighteens and 15.4% of those over 64.
