= Austin, Pennsylvania =

Borough in Pennsylvania, US

- Borough
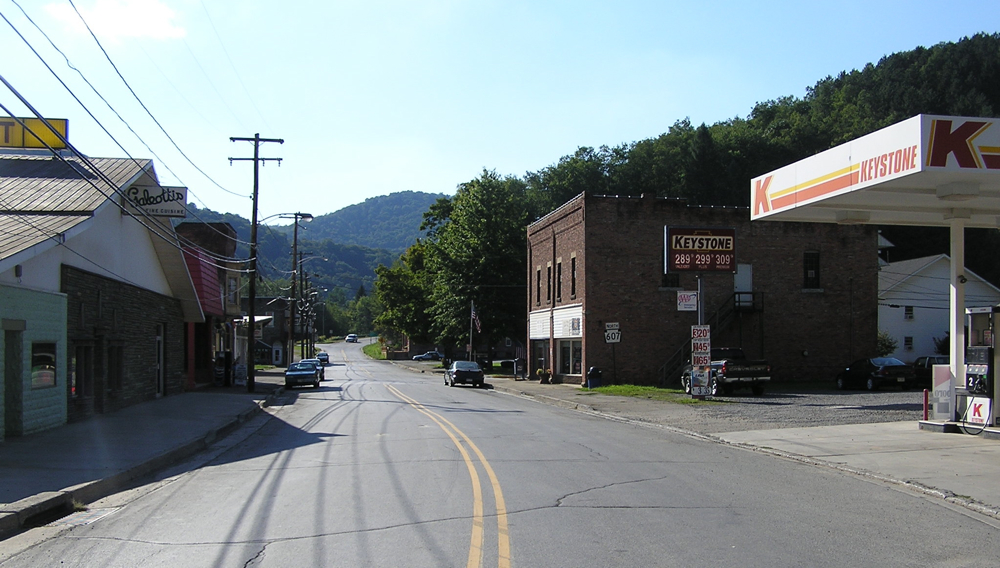
- Main Street (PA 607) in Austin, September 2007

- Location of Austin in Potter County, Pennsylvania.

- Location within the U.S. state of Pennsylvania Austin (the United States)
- Coordinates: 41°37′51″N 78°05′37″W
- Country: United States
- State: Pennsylvania
- County: Potter
- Settled: 1856
- Incorporated (borough): 1888
- Named for: Edward Oramel Austin

Government
  - Body: Borough council
  - Mayor: Kate Crosby (L)
  - Fire District: Austin Volunteer Fire Dept.

Area
  - Total: 4.04 sq mi (10.47 km^{2})
  - Land: 4.04 sq mi (10.47 km^{2})
  - Water: 0 sq mi (0.00 km^{2})
- Elevation (borough benchmark): 1,352 ft (412 m)
- Highest elevation (high points at east end of borough): 2,260 ft (690 m)
- Lowest elevation (Freeman Run): 1,305 ft (398 m)

Population (2020)
  - Total: 482
  - Density: 119.3/sq mi (46.05/km^{2})
- Time zone: Eastern (EST)
  - Summer (DST): EDT
- ZIP code: 16720
- Area code: 814
- FIPS code: 42-03576

Austin is a borough along the Freeman Run (river) in southwestern Potter County, Pennsylvania, United States. The population was 482 at the 2020 census.

== History ==
In September 1856, Edward Oramel Austin came to Freeman Run. He fell in love with the area and began to build a village. From then on, he lived his entire life in the valley. He served in the Civil War and returned to his valley after. His dream grew until his town, at one period, was one of the largest in Potter County. At the time of his death in 1908, the town of Austin was at its most productive with paper mills and saw mills as well. He lived to see a great dream come true. Two years later, nearly the entire town was swept away when the great dam built by the Bayless Pulp and Paper Company failed to hold back its 500,000,000+ gallons of water. The home of E.O. Austin went with it.

The building is a replica of E.O. Austin's house of the 1800s. It is in almost the exact spot as it was before the flood of 1911. The inside of the home is a museum filled with memorabilia from Austin and the surrounding areas (Wharton, Keating Summit and Odin). The goal of “The New, Oldest Home in Austin” is to preserve our own town's history – past, present, and future.

=== 1911 dam failure ===
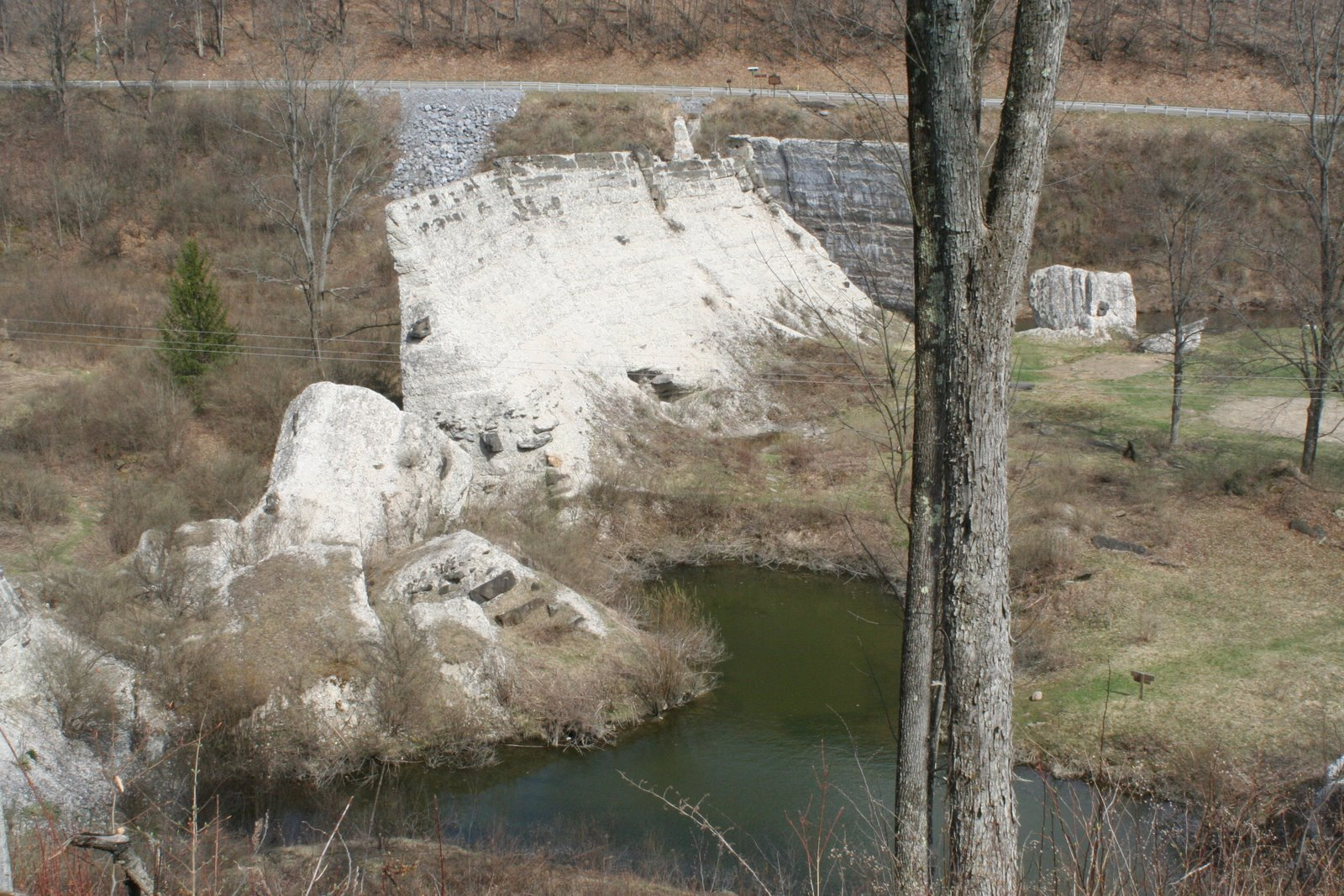
Austin Dam ruins

The Austin Dam, also known as the Bayless Dam, was a concrete gravity dam for the Bayless Pulp and Paper Mill. Built in 1909, it was the largest dam of its type in Pennsylvania at the time. The catastrophic failure of the dam on September 30, 1911, destroyed much of the town and killed 78 people. The town was rebuilt, under the slogan "the town too tough to die". This was later changed to "the best town by a dam site".

=== Mayoral controversy, 2021 ===
On November 9, 2021, Kate Crosby won the mayoral election against Jim Setzer. They received 38 and 30 votes, respectively. On July 7, 2021, Crosby pleaded guilty for the felony crime of aggravated assault by vehicle on December 21, 2014, which resulted in the death of one and the maiming of another man. The Potter Leader-Enterprise wrote that Crosby's felony conviction may render her ineligible to hold office as mayor, because the Pennsylvania Constitution bars anyone convicted of an "infamous crime" from holding office in Pennsylvania. Once in office, the DA or attorney general would need to file a quo warranto to remove her. On June 7, 2022, the Austin Borough Council followed Judge Stephen Minor's court decision to remove Kate Crosby as mayor of Austin. During a special meeting on June 30, the Austin borough council unanimously appointed James Setzer as mayor.

== Geography ==
According to the United States Census Bureau, the borough has a total area of 4.0 square miles (10.4 km^{2}), all land.

== Demographics ==
Historical population
Census	Pop.	Note	%±
1890	1,679		—
1900	2,300		37.0%
1910	2,941		27.9%
1920	1,556		−47.1%
1930	1,116		−28.3%
1940	1,050		−5.9%
1950	804		−23.4%
1960	721		−10.3%
1970	626		−13.2%
1980	740		18.2%
1990	569		−23.1%
2000	623		9.5%
2010	562		−9.8%
2020	482		−14.2%
2021 (est.)	477	▼	−1.0%

As of the 2020 United States Census there were 482 people, 230 households in the borough. The population density was 119.6 people per square mile (46/km^{2}). There were 266 housing units at an average density of 65.8 per square mile (25.4/km^{2}).

The racial makeup of the borough was 96.68% White, 0.41% Hispanic or Latino, 0.21% Asian, 0% Black or African American, 0% American Indian and Alaska Native, 0% Native Hawaiian and Pacific Islander 0.21% some other race, and 0.29% from two or more races.

There were 230 households, 25.8% had children under the age of 18 living with them, 50.4% were married couples living together, 30.9% had a female householder with no spouse present, and 13.9% had a female householder with no spouse present. The average household size was 3.49.

In the borough the population by age range was 6.8% under the age of 5, 19% from age 5 to 18, 56.2% from age 18 to 64, and 18% 65 or older. The median age was 39.6 years.

The median household income was $48,750. The median income for families was $60,417, median income for married-couple families was $71,071, and median income for non-family households was $30,817.

Poverty, 3.2% of the population in Austin were below the poverty line, compared to 12.0% of all people in Pennsylvania,

Education level people 25 years and older in Austin was, high school or equivalent degree 49.1%, some college (no degree) 29.4%, Associate degree 3.7%, Bachelor's degree 6.1%, Graduate or professional degree 0%.

Employment classification of the population of Austin was, employee of private company workers 77.1%, self-employed in own incorporated business workers 1.0%, private not-for-profit wage and salary workers 9.4%, local, state, and federal government workers 11.8%, and self-employed in own not incorporated business workers and unpaid family workers 0.7%.

Employment and labor force status, 61.4% of the population was employed at the time of the latest census.

The portion of the population in Austin with any sort of disability is 17.4%, and 8.6% of the total population lacks health insurance coverage.

== Arts and culture ==
=== The Dam Show ===
'The Dam Show' is an annual outdoor music festival at the Austin Dam Memorial Park. Held each year in August, the show features live music and a colorful light show projected on the Dam ruins after dark. The event includes live music, camping, food and craft vendors. A line-up of musicians plays on each day of the 3-day event. Part of the proceeds from the event go to help fund projects at the Austin Dam Memorial Park.

=== Gathering of the Artist Festival ===
The annual Gathering of the Artist Festival is an annual 4-day arts festival at the Austin Dam Memorial Park. Held each year in July, the festival features chainsaw carvers, art vendors, solo musicians, bands, camping, food and craft vendors. On Sunday much of the art that was created onsite is auctioned off.

=== Austin Dam Pow Wow ===
The annual Austin Dam Pow-Wow happens the last weekend in September. Hosted by Wolf Pack Pow-Wow Association at the Austin Dam Memorial Park. The event features Native American drumming and dancing with examples of Native-American crafts, arts, and food items.

=== Terrifying Trail ===
The annual Dam Terrifying Trail event put on by Austin PRIDE Committee takes place in October at the Austin Dam Memorial Park which gives an appropriate setting. The paths in and around the camping area south of the dam are transformed into a "stage" for a cast of characters to present their scariest scenes followed by a Halloween themed movie projected on the dam.

== See also ==
- List of boroughs in Pennsylvania
- Austin Dam
